= Natalia Eremina =

Latvian chess player

Personal information
- Born: March 23, 1967 (age 59) Riga, Latvia

Chess career
- Country: Latvia
- Peak rating: 2050 (January 1989)

Natalia Eremina (Latvian: Natālija Jerjomina; born March 23, 1967, in Riga) is a Latvian chess player who won the Latvian Chess Championship for women in 1988.

In 1980s, Natalia Eremina has been a steady participant in Latvian Chess Championship finals for women (1983–1990). She won 4th place in 1985, and 3rd place in 1989 but in 1988 she won the title of champion, ahead of all the Latvian women chess strongest players: Anda Šafranska, Ingūna Erneste, Ilze Rubene, Ingrīda Priedīte, Astra Goldmane, Tamāra Vilerte, Vija Rožlapa, Sarma Sedleniece. Natalia Eremina played for Latvia in Spartakiada of USSR in Minsk in 1986, at third women board. In the early 1990s she retired from an active chess life.
