= Liepājas Rokāde =

Latvian chess tournament

Liepājas Rokāde ("Liepāja Castling") is international "open" chess championship, annually held in Liepāja, Latvia in August. The first Liepājas rokāde was held in 1994, the last in 2018.

== List of winners ==
Year	Open Tournament	Super Tournament	Blitz tournament	Team Tournament
1994	(Latvia) Viesturs Meijers			
1995	(Latvia) Edvīns Ķeņģis			
1996	(Latvia) Guntis Jankovskis			
1997	(Latvia) Normunds Miezis			
1998	(Latvia) Daniel Fridman		(Latvia) Juzefs Petkēvičs	
1999	(Latvia) Rolands Bērziņš			
2000	(Latvia) Evgeny Sveshnikov	(Kazakhstan) Darmen Sadvakasov (United States) Maxim Dlugy		
2001	(Latvia) Evgeny Sveshnikov	(Spain) Alexei Shirov	(Latvia) Normunds Miezis	
2002	(Latvia) Evgeny Sveshnikov	(Latvia) Evgeny Sveshnikov	(Latvia) Daniel Fridman	
2003	(Latvia) Arnolds Luckāns	(Russia) Alexander Khalifman	(United States) Maxim Dlugy	
2004	(Estonia) Meelis Kanep	(Estonia) Kaido Külaots		
2005	(Lithuania) Darius Zagorskis	(Netherlands) Loek van Wely	(Lithuania) Vaidas Sakalauskas	Švyturys
2006	(Lithuania) Šarūnas Šulskis	(Bulgaria) Kiril Georgiev	(Bulgaria) Kiril Georgiev	Švyturys
2007	(Lithuania) Vytautas Vaznonis	(Germany) Arkadij Naiditsch	(Lithuania) Šarūnas Šulskis	Joker
2008	(Latvia) Valdis Troņenkovs (Open A) (Latvia) Aleksandrs Smirnovs (Open B) (Russia) Evgeny Levin (Open C)	(Russia) Evgeny Romanov	(Germany) Daniel Fridman	Joker
2009	(Latvia) Arturs Neikšāns		(Latvia) Verners Putka	Joker
2010	(Latvia) Oleg Krivonosov		(United States) Jaan Ehlvest	Joker
2011	(Latvia) Normunds Miezis		(United States) Jaan Ehlvest	Terrabalt
2012	(Russia) Alexander Khalifman		(Germany) Daniel Fridman	Terrabalt
2013	(Lithuania) Emilis Pileckis	(Bulgaria) Kiril Georgiev	(Latvia) Igor Kovalenko	MRU–Gintars
2014	(Latvia) Igor Kovalenko		(Latvia) Igor Kovalenko	Terrabalt
2015	(Russia) Evgeny Romanov	(Latvia) Igor Kovalenko	(Russia) Andrey Esipenko	Terrabalt
2016	(Russia) Vladimir Fedoseev	(Russia) Daniil Lintchevski	(United States) Jaan Ehlvest	Terrabalt
2017	(Belarus) Vladislav Kovalev	(Germany) Daniel Fridman	(Germany) Daniel Fridman	Terrabalt
2018	(Estonia) Kaido Külaots	(Germany) Daniel Fridman	(Lithuania) Tomas Laurušas	Terrabalt

Super Tournament is not played in 2009-2012 and 2014.

== Liepājas Rokāde 2009 ==
The Liepājas rokāde 2009 was opened on August 6, 2009. The tournament taking place in Liepāja Biedrības nams. The ceremony started from the speech of tournament director Āris Ozoliņš and Vita Hartmane, which read a letter of the Liepāja mayor Uldis Sesks to participants of the tournament. In 2009 there were 147 players from Latvia, Lithuania, Sweden, Portugal and Czech Republic, 7% of whom were women. The open tournament was held on 79 chess tables. The championship utilizes FIDE rules and uses Swiss pairing system in 13 rounds. The tournaments judged three referee — Dashkevics, Borisovs and A. Cimiņš. Overall prize fund — 2410 LVL and cups for the first 3 places. The competition traditionally has a large number of sponsors, including Liepājas Metalurgs and Liepāja City Council, additionally there was participation fee about 10 EUR for the players. Tournament results:

- (Latvia) Arturs Neikšāns — 1st place
- (Czech Republic) Igors Rausis — 2nd place
- (Latvia) Guntars Antoms — 3rd place
