= Augusts Strautmanis =

Latvian chess player

Personal information
- Born: July 11, 1907 Riga, Latvia
- Died: January 8, 1990 (aged 82) Ikšķile, Latvia

Chess career
- Country: Latvia
- Title: National master

Augusts Strautmanis (July 11, 1907, Riga – January 8, 1990, Ikšķile) was a Latvian chess master.

== Chess career ==
Augusts Strautmanis started to play chess at an early childhood under the guidance of his father. Already in 1926 at the Latvian Second Chess Congress, the new chess player won a high fourth place (after Fricis Apšenieks, Teodors Bergs and Vladimirs Petrovs) and was included in the first independent Latvian team which participated at the 2nd Chess Olympiad in The Hague in 1928. Augusts Strautmanis played at second board and got 7.5 points out of 16 possible (+6 -7 =3). In 1938/39 in the Latvian First Speed Chess Championship, where 1319 participants took part at various stages, Augusts Strautmanis becomes the winner. During the years of Second World War he won the Riga Championship of 1943, shared the 3rd–6th place at the Latvian Chess Championship of the same year. Also, in the post-war years, Augusts Strautmanis continued to successfully participate in the Latvian Chess Championships – after the second place in 1946 (Alexander Koblencs won it) he became the Latvian Champion of 1948 (after winning the additional fight with Igor Zhdanov). At the USSR team championship semi-final of 1948 in Riga, Augusts Strautmanis represented the Latvian team. In 1949, at the Latvian championship he still shared the 3rd–4th place, but the last time Augusts Strautmanis played at the Latvian championship finals of 1951. In later years, Augusts Strautmanis did not take active part in important tournaments, but after opening of the Sports School at Talsi district in 1954, he became a trainer of the chess section.

== Lawyer career ==
Augusts Strautmanis graduated from the Second Gymnasium of Riga State in 1926 and then from the Economic Sciences and Law Faculty of the University of Latvia. The 1939th annual edition of "I know him" writes the following about August Strautmanis: "... chess player, Latvian speed chess master, assistant of attorney and assistant of solicitor in the Road department of the Ministry of Transport." After the Second World War moved to Talsi and until his death was a known lawyer.

== Personal life ==
Augusts Strautmanis married in 1936; the family had four children. Under his literature teacher and poet Kārlis Krūza impression he had a deep interest in literature, and he also wrote poems and stories.

== Notable games ==
- Gerard Kroone vs Augusts Strautmanis, Olympiad 1928 "Distraught Man is Safe" – Chessgames.com game of the day 10.07.2010.
- Augusts Strautmanis vs Luis Argentino Palau, Olympiad 1928 Very notable miniature where Strautmanis lost.
- Augusts Strautmanis vs Mikhail Tal, Latvian Championship 1951 The epic battle with young Tal.
