= Ilga Kļaviņa =

Latvian chess player

Personal information
- Born: Ilga Dzenīte; September 3, 1941 (age 85) Riga, Latvia

Chess career
- Country: Soviet Union; Latvia

Ilga Kļaviņa (born March 9, 1941, Riga, Latvia as Ilga Dzenīte) is a Latvian chess player.

== Chess career ==
At the age of 16, in 1957, Ilga Kļaviņa won the Riga Chess Championship for women. She played for Latvia in 5th Soviet Team Chess Championship in Vilnius at girls board (as Dzenīte) (+1 -3 =4) Her best result in the Latvian Chess Championship for women was the 2nd place in 1968 after lost additional match to Sarma Sedleniece - 1,5:3,5. Also she won three bronze medals in the Latvian Chess Championship for women in 1958, 1970, and 1971. Also later Ilga Kļaviņa continues to actively participate in chess competitions. In 2008, she won the women's chess championship of Vidzeme but in 2011 she played in the Latvian Team Chess Championship.

== Personal life ==
Ilga Kļaviņa is a graduate of the Riga Polytechnical Institute as an engineer-technologist. She was married with Latvian chess master Jānis Kļaviņš (1933–2008).
