= Guntars Antoms =

Latvian lawyer and chess player (born 1960)

Personal information
- Born: July 24, 1960 (age 65) Riga, Latvia

Chess career
- Country: Latvia
- Title: International Master (2001)
- FIDE rating: 2315 (June 2022)
- Peak rating: 2486 (July 2001)

Guntars Antoms (Latvian: Guntars Antoms; born July 24, 1960, in Riga) is a Latvian lawyer and chess player who holds the FIDE title of International Master (2001).

== Chess career ==
His first success came at the age of 14 when he won 4th place at the Latvian Junior Championship. Three years later he shared first place with Edvīns Ķeņģis at the Latvian Junior Championship. Antoms has been a steady participant in Latvian Chess Championship finals but in 2001 he won this tournament (ahead grandmasters Viesturs Meijers, Arturs Neikšāns, Jānis Klovāns, Zigurds Lanka, Ilmārs Starostīts). He was awarded the International Master title in 2001. Guntars Antoms is a member of board and vice president of Latvian Chess Federation.

Antoms played for Latvia in Chess Olympiads:

- In 2004, at second reserve board in the 36th Chess Olympiad in Calvia (+1 −2 =1).

He played for Latvia in European Team Chess Championship:

- In 2001, at fourth board in Leon (+0 −2 =2).

== Lawyer career ==
Antoms graduated from Faculty of Law the University of Latvia. He is Baltic International Arbitration court attorney at law, member of the presidium and member of Latvian Criminal Bar Association.
