= Arturs Bernotas =

Latvian chess player (born 1995)

Personal information
- Born: 1 June 1995 (age 31)

Chess career
- Country: Latvia
- Title: FIDE Master (2015)
- Peak rating: 2436 (March 2018)

Arturs Bernotas (born 1 June 1995) is a Latvian chess player. He was awarded the FIDE Master title in 2015.

== Biography ==
Bernotas came to the Riga chess school in 2004. His first coach was Leonid Borisov, and he later trained with Jānis Klovāns and Arturs Neikšāns. In 2011, Bernotas won the Latvian Youth Championship and the European youth chess rapid championship in the age group U16. In 2014, he won the chess festival Riga Technical University Open B tournament. In 2016, Bernotas won the Riga chess championship. In March 2017 in Vilnius, he fulfilled his first norm for the International Master (IM) title in the second stage of the Baltic Zonal tournament. From 2008 on, Bernotas regularly participated in Latvian Chess Championship finals. Bernotas won the Latvian Chess Championship in 2017 and fulfilled his second norm for the International Master title.

Arturs Bernotas played for Latvia in Chess Olympiads:

- in 2018, at the reserve board in the 43rd Chess Olympiad in Batumi (+2 −2 =3).

He graduated from Riga secondary school No. 54 and studied at the University of Latvia.

== Coaching ==
Bernotas is also an active chess coach. According to an interview, he currently works with up-and-coming players Daniels Milovs, Maksims Aminovs, and Vadims Kolosovs.

== Aspirations ==
In a 2019 interview, Bernotas stated his intention to eventually achieve the title of Grandmaster. He claimed to be frustrated with his "lack of progress", and aspired to intensify his training in order to eventually find success.
