= Linda Krūmiņa =

Latvian chess player (born 1984)

Personal information
- Born: 16 December 1984 (age 41) Tukums, Latvia

Chess career
- Country: Latvia
- Title: Woman FIDE Master (2017)
- Peak rating: 2134 (December 2017)

Linda Krūmiņa (born 16 December 1984 in Tukums) is a Latvian chess player who holds the title of Woman FIDE Master. In 2017 she won the Latvian Women Chess Championship.

== Biography ==
In the late 1990s and early 2000s Linda Krūmiņa was one of the leading young chess players in Latvia. In 1999 she won the Latvian Girl Chess Championship. She regularly participated of the European Youth Chess Championships (2001 - U20, 2002 - U18) and World Youth Chess Championships in different age groups (1995 - U12, 1997, 1998 - U14). In the early 2000s, she also regularly participated in finals of the Latvian Women Chess Championships.

From 2005 to 2015, Linda Krūmiņa rarely participated in chess tournaments, and only from 2016 she returned to chess competitions. In 2016, at the Latvian Women Chess Championship, she divided the first place for two rounds to the finish, but the defeats in the last two rounds deprived her of the prize. In April 2017, in Riga she participated in the Women's European Individual Chess Championship. At the end of July and the beginning of August of the same year, Linda Krūmiņa took part in the International Women chess tournament in Erfurt and fulfilled the Woman FIDE Master (WFM) norm. In October 2017, she won the Latvian Women Chess Championship, ahead of two Woman Grandmasters (WGM) - Ilze Bērziņa and Ingūna Erneste.

In February 2022 Linda Krūmiņa won Cannes chess festival B tournament (for amateurs).

Linda Krūmiņa played for Latvia in Chess Olympiads:

- In 2018, at fourth board in the 43rd Chess Olympiad in Batumi (+5 -1 =3).
