= Israel Zilber =

Latvian chess player (born 1933)

Personal information
- Native name: ישראל צלבר
- Born: June 25, 1933 Riga, Latvia

Chess career
- Country: Latvia; Soviet Union; Israel; United States
- Peak rating: 2430 (January 1980)

Josif Israel Zilber (Latvian: Israels Zilbers, Hebrew: ישראל צלבר; born June 25, 1933) is a Latvian chess player who won the Latvian Chess Championship in 1958.

== Latvia chess player ==
Zilber was born in Riga, Latvia. He achieved excellent results during the period 1950 to 1973 when he lived in Soviet-occupied Latvia. He represented the Latvian SSR in Soviet Team juniors chess championships in Leningrad in 1951 at first board (5½/9).

He played in Latvian Chess Championship finals in:

- 1950 (6th place)
- 1951 (8th place)
- 1952 (4th place)
- 1953 (9th place)
- 1954 (7th place)
- 1955 (6th place)
- 1956 (2nd place)
- 1957 (4th place)
- 1958 (1st place, ahead Aivars Gipslis and Mikhail Tal)
- 1961 (4th place)
- 1962 (2nd place)
- 1963 (5th place)
- 1964 (3rd place)
- 1972 (2nd place)
- 1973 (9th place)

He was Riga champion in 1962 and 1974, and "Daugava" champion in 1962 and won second place in 1965.

In the Championship of the USSR he reached semifinals in 1956, 1957, 1958, and 1962.

Zilber also represented the Latvian SSR in Soviet Team chess championships in 1953 (second place at seventh board: +4−1=2), 1955 (at fourth board: +2−2=5), 1958 (at first board: +1−5=1), 1960 (at fifth board: 2½/7), 1962 (second place at fourth board: +4−1=3), and 1963 (at fourth board: 6/9).

Zilber played in the Soviet Team chess cup for team "Daugava" at fifth board in 1961 (+0−3=3) and 1964 (+0−1=0).

== US career ==
After 1974, Zilber immigrated first to Israel and then to the United States. In 1979, he played in Hastings International Chess Congress; in 1980 Zilber won the Masters Open tournament in Biel and a year later he won Limoges tournament. His name can also be found among the participants of Manchester Benedictine in 1980.

However, his life in the United States became fraught with hardship. Zilber would end up homeless on the streets of New York City through most of the 1980s and played chess with strangers in Washington Square Park. This setting was the story about the park in the 1993 film Searching for Bobby Fischer. According to Fred Waitzkin's book Searching for Bobby Fischer, IM Zilber was considered the best player in Washington Square Park with the exception of GM Roman Dzindzichashvili, and would leave the park whenever Dzindzichashvili would arrive there. Details of Zilber's later years are inconclusive – an unconfirmed story states that during a harsh winter he froze to death. A different theory claims that he is not listed in the Social Security Death Index and could still be alive.

== Notable games ==
- Mikhail Tal vs. Zilber, URS 1952. First victory over young Mikhail Tal.
- Zilber vs. Mikhail Tal, URS 1958. The deciding battle in the 1958 Latvian Chess Championship.
- Zilber vs. Yasser Seirawan, Hastings 1979/80. A notable match with Yasser Seirawan.
