= Latvian Chess Championship =

The Latvian Chess Championship (Latvian: Latvijas Šaha čempionāts) is the annual national chess tournament of Latvia among men and women players, which was established in 1924. It is organized by the Latvian Chess Federation (Latvian: Latvijas Šaha federācija), previously - Latvian Chess Union (Latvian: Latvijas Šaha savienība).

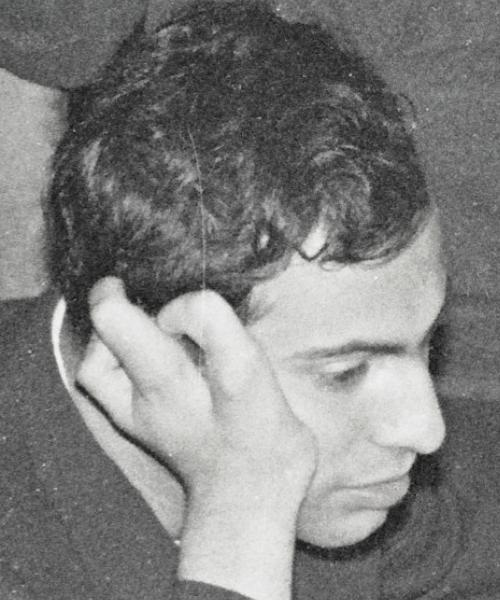
Mikhail Tal was winner twice - in 1953 and 1965.

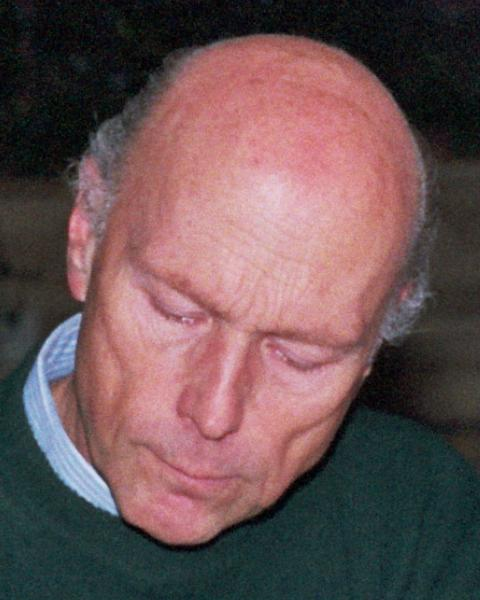
Jānis Klovāns won the Latvian Championship nine times: 1954, 1962, 1967, 1968, 1970, 1971, 1975, 1979, and 1986.

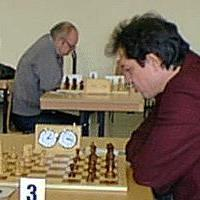
Edvīns Keņģis is an eight-time Latvian Champion, winning the national contest in 1984, 1987, 1988, 1989, 1990, 1997, 2004 and 2005.

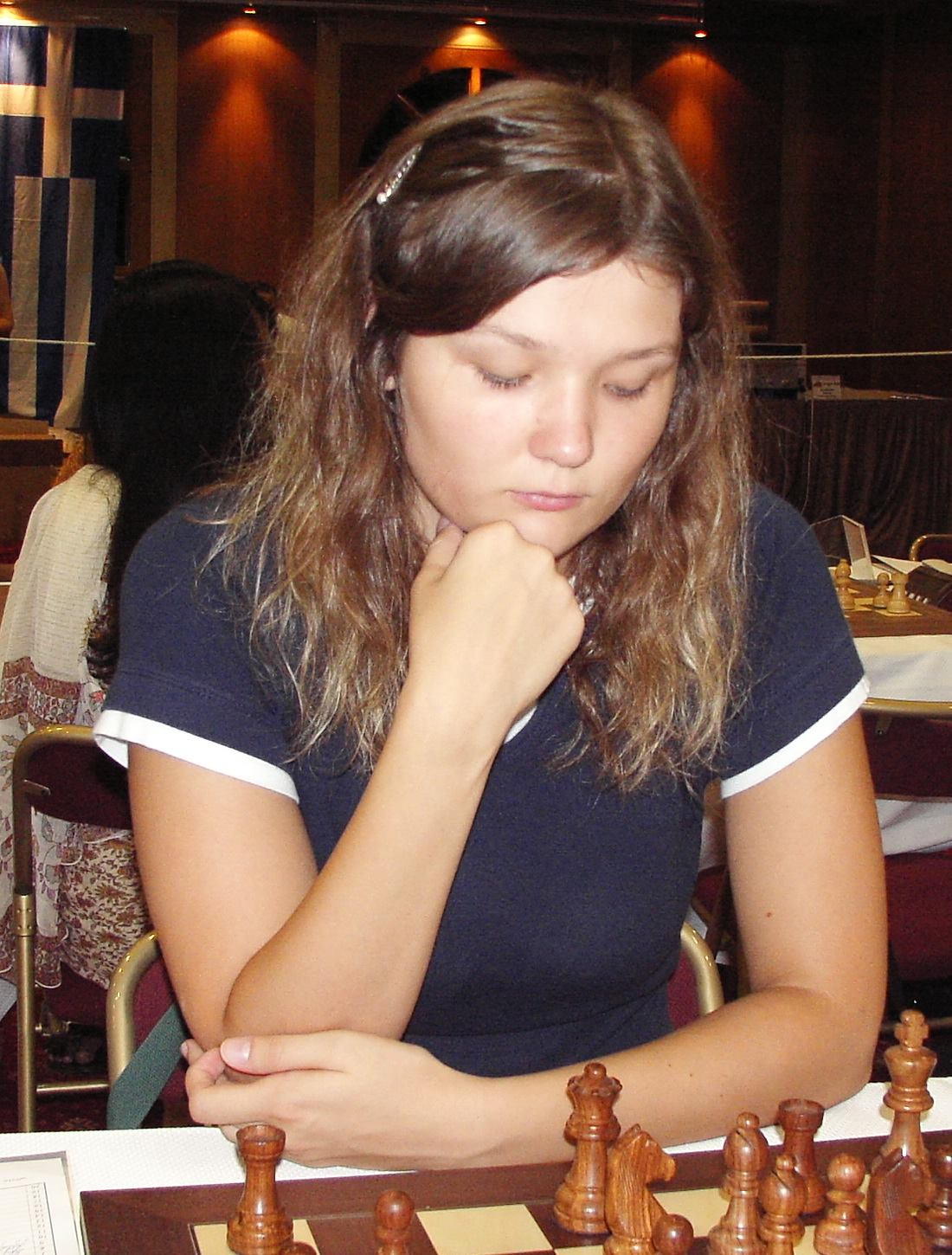
Laura Rogule won the Latvian Chess Championship for women thirteen times: 2003, 2005, 2006, 2009, 2010, 2011, 2013, 2015, 2016, 2020, 2021, 2022 and 2023.

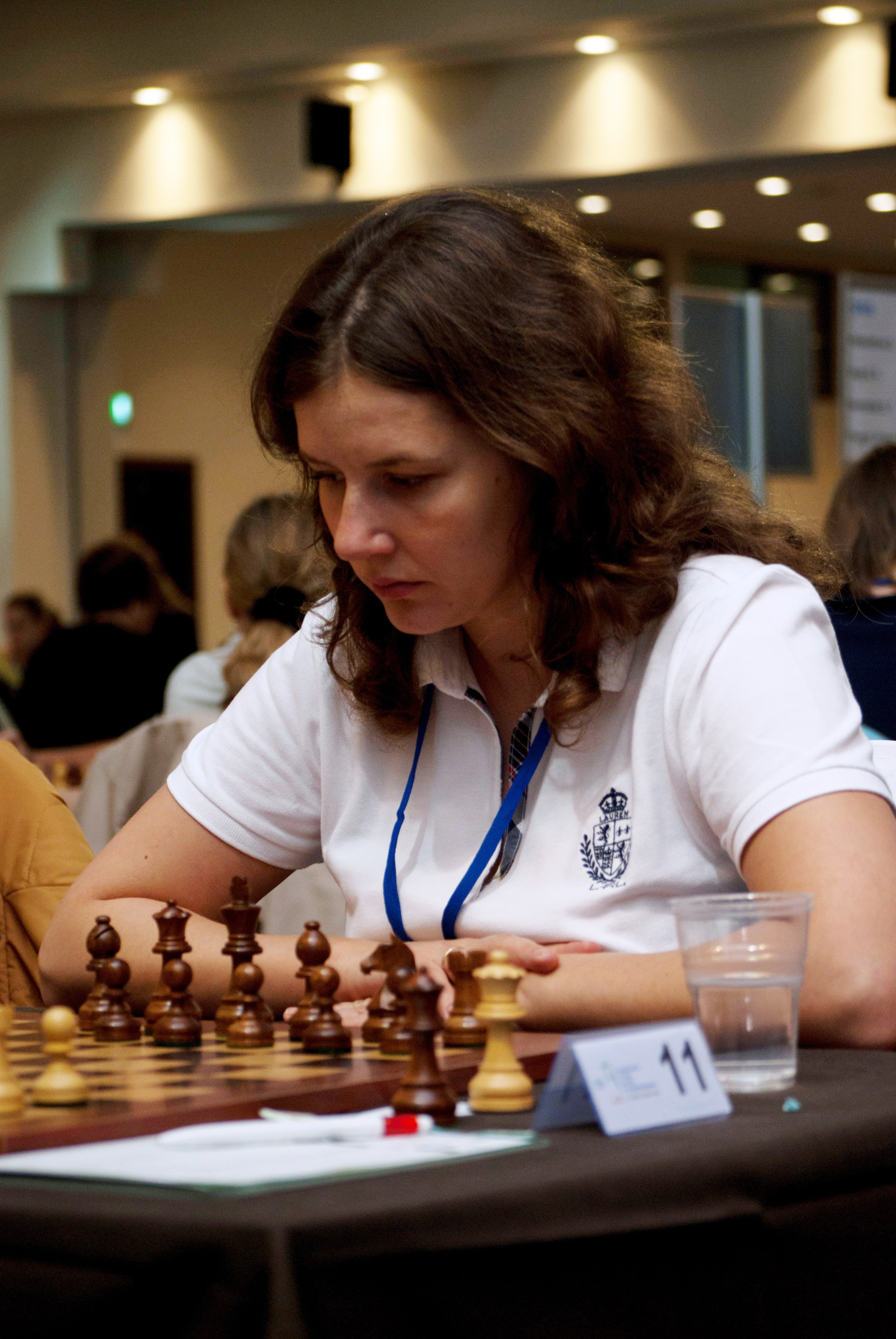
Dana Reizniece-Ozola won the Latvian Chess Championship in 1998, 1999, 2000, and 2001.

== History ==
The first professional Latvian chess players can be traced back to the 19th century, when Latvia was a part of the Russian Empire. They participated in chess tournaments and union congresses, organized by the Riga Chess Association which was founded in 1890. After World War I and the Latvian War of Independence and the establishment of the Latvian Chess Union in 1924, the official Latvian chess championship tradition was started as the Latvian Chess Congresses. The first Latvian Chess Congress took place in 1924 in Riga.

After the start of the Soviet occupation of Latvia the 1940 edition was not held, but in 1941 the first Chess Championship of the Latvian SSR was played. The tournament was also played once during the German occupation during WWII, in 1943. After the restoration of Latvian independence, the Latvian Championship returned in 1990.

The tournament has been mostly held in the capital Riga and the village of Mežezers of Pļaviņas Municipality in southern Vidzeme.

== Championships and winners ==
Year	City	Men's Winner	Women's Winner
1924	Riga	Hermanis Matisons	
1926-7	Riga	Fricis Apšenieks	
1930-1	Riga	Vladimirs Petrovs	
1932	Jelgava	Movsas Feigins	
1934	Riga	Fricis Apšenieks	
1935	Riga	Vladimirs Petrovs	
1937	Riga	Vladimirs Petrovs	Milda Lauberte
1938-9	Riga	Vladimirs Petrovs	Elise Vogel
1941	Riga	Alexander Koblencs	Marta Krūmiņa
1943	Riga	Igors Ždanovs	Milda Lauberte
1944	Udelnaya, Russian SFSR	Voldemārs Mežgailis	
1945	Riga	Alexander Koblencs	
1946	Riga	Alexander Koblencs	
1947	Riga	Zigfrīds Solmanis	
1948	Riga	Augusts Strautmanis	Milda Lauberte
1949	Riga	Alexander Koblencs	Milda Lauberte
1950	Riga	Voldemārs Mežgailis	Milda Lauberte
1951	Riga	Mark Pasman	Milda Lauberte
1952	Riga	Jānis Kļaviņš	Milda Lauberte
1953	Riga	Mikhail Tal	Milda Lauberte
1954	Riga	Jānis Klovāns	Milda Lauberte
1955	Riga	Aivars Gipslis	Milda Lauberte
1956	Riga	Aivars Gipslis	Milda Lauberte
1957	Riga	Aivars Gipslis	Milda Lauberte
1958	Riga	Israel Zilber	Zara Nakhimovskaya
1959	Riga	Kārlis Klāsups	Zara Nakhimovskaya
1960	Riga	Aivars Gipslis	Milda Lauberte
1961	Riga	Aivars Gipslis	Zara Nakhimovskaya
1962	Riga	Jānis Klovāns	Zara Nakhimovskaya
1963	Riga	Aivars Gipslis	Astra Klovāne
1964	Riga	Aivars Gipslis	Astra Klovāne
1965	Riga	Mikhail Tal	Astra Klovāne
1966	Riga	Aivars Gipslis	Benita Vēja
1967	Riga	Jānis Klovāns	Vija Rožlapa
1968	Riga	Jānis Klovāns	Sarma Sedleniece
1969	Riga	Anatolijs Šmits	Astra Klovāne
1970	Riga	Jānis Klovāns	Astra Klovāne
1971	Riga	Jānis Klovāns	Vija Rožlapa
1972	Riga	Lev Gutman	Vija Rožlapa
1973	Daugavpils(M) Riga(W)	Alvis Vītoliņš	Tamāra Vilerte; Ingrīda Priedīte
1974	Riga	Juzefs Petkēvičs; Vladimir Kirpichnikov	Vija Rožlapa
1975	Riga	Jānis Klovāns; Anatolijs Šmits	Astra Goldmane
1976	Riga	Alvis Vītoliņš	Ilze Rubene
1977	Riga	Alvis Vītoliņš	Astra Klovāne
1978	Riga	Alvis Vītoliņš	Astra Klovāne
1979	Riga	Jānis Klovāns	Ingrīda Priedīte
1980	Riga	Valerij Zhuravliov	Tatjana Voronova
1981	Riga	Aleksander Wojtkiewicz	Astra Goldmane
1982	Riga (M), Jūrmala (W)	Alvis Vītoliņš	Anda Šafranska
1983	Riga	Alvis Vītoliņš	Astra Goldmane
1984	Riga	Edvīns Ķeņģis	Anda Šafranska
1985	Riga	Alvis Vītoliņš; Juzefs Petkēvičs	Tatjana Voronova
1986	Riga	Jānis Klovāns	Tatjana Voronova
1987	Riga	Edvīns Ķeņģis	Tatjana Voronova
1988	Riga	Edvīns Ķeņģis	Natālija Jerjomina
1989	Riga	Edvīns Ķeņģis	Ingūna Erneste
1990	Riga	Edvīns Ķeņģis	Anda Šafranska
1991	Riga	Normunds Miezis	Anda Šafranska
1992	Riga	Valerij Zhuravliov	Anna Hahn
1993	Riga	Zigurds Lanka	Anda Šafranska
1994	Riga	Valerij Zhuravliov	Anda Šafranska
1995	Riga	Igors Rausis	Ilze Rubene
1996	Riga	Daniel Fridman	Anda Šafranska
1997	Riga	Edvīns Ķeņģis	Anda Šafranska
1998	Riga	Māris Krakops	Dana Reizniece
1999	Riga	Arturs Neikšāns	Dana Reizniece
2000	Riga	Viesturs Meijers	Dana Reizniece
2001	Riga	Guntars Antoms	Dana Reizniece
2002	Riga	Ilmārs Starostīts	Ingūna Erneste
2003	Riga	Evgeny Sveshnikov	Laura Rogule
2004	Riga	Edvīns Ķeņģis	Ilze Bērziņa
2005	Riga	Edvīns Ķeņģis	Laura Rogule
2006	Riga	Normunds Miezis	Laura Rogule
2008	Mežezers (Pļaviņas Municipality)	Evgeny Sveshnikov	Ilze Bērziņa
2009	Mežezers (Pļaviņas Municipality)	Vitālijs Samoļins	Laura Rogule
2010	Mežezers (Pļaviņas Municipality)	Evgeny Sveshnikov	Laura Rogule
2011	Mežezers (Pļaviņas Municipality)	Arturs Neikšāns	Laura Rogule
2012	Riga	Vitālijs Samoļins	Ilze Bērziņa
2013	Riga	Igor Kovalenko	Laura Rogule
2014	Riga	Igor Kovalenko	Katrīna Šķiņķe
2015	Riga	Arturs Neikšāns	Laura Rogule
2016	Riga	Vladimirs Svešņikovs	Laura Rogule
2017	Riga	Arturs Bernotas	Linda Krūmiņa
2018	Riga	Ņikita Meškovs	Elizabete Limanovska
2019	Riga	Arturs Neikšāns	Ilze Bērziņa
2020	Riga	Zigurds Lanka	Laura Rogule
2021	Riga	Rolands Bērziņš	Laura Rogule
2022	Riga	Ilmārs Starostīts	Laura Rogule
2023	Riga	Toms Kantāns	Laura Rogule
2024	Riga	Guntis Jankovskis	Ilze Bērziņa
2025	Riga	Arturs Neikšāns	Marija Kuznecova
2026	Riga	Toms Kantāns	Marija Kuznecova

== Multiple champions ==
#	Men's Winner	Titles	Years
1	Jānis Klovāns	9	1954, 1962, 1967–68, 1970–71, 1975, 1979, 1986
2	Aivars Gipslis	8	1955-57, 1960–61, 1963–64, 1966
3	Edvīns Ķeņģis	8	1984, 1987–90, 1997, 2004–05
4	Alvis Vītoliņš	7	1973, 1976–78, 1982–83, 1985
5	Arturs Neikšāns	5	1999, 2011, 2015, 2019, 2025
6	Vladimirs Petrovs	4	1930, 1935, 1937, 1938
7	Aleksandrs Koblencs	4	1941, 1945–46, 1949
8	Valerij Zhuravliov	3	1980, 1992, 1994
9	Evgeny Sveshnikov	3	2003, 2008, 2010
10	Fricis Apšenieks	2	1927, 1934
11	Voldemārs Mežgailis	2	1944, 1950
12	Mikhail Tal	2	1953, 1965
13	Anatolijs Šmits	2	1969, 1975
14	Juzefs Petkēvičs	2	1974, 1985
15	Normunds Miezis	2	1991, 2006
16	Vitālijs Samoļins	2	2009, 2012
17	Igor Kovalenko	2	2013-14
18	Zigurds Lanka	2	1993, 2020
19	Ilmārs Starostīts	2	2002, 2022
20	Toms Kantāns	2	2023, 2026

#	Women's Winner	Titles	Years
1	Milda Lauberte	13	1937, 1943, 1948–57, 1960
2	Laura Rogule	13	2003, 2005–06, 2009–11, 2013, 2015–16, 2020–23
3	Anda Šafranska	8	1982, 1984, 1990–91, 1993–94, 1996–97
4	Astra Klovāne	7	1963-65, 1969–70, 1977–78
5	Ilze Bērziņa	5	2004, 2008, 2012, 2019, 2024
6	Zara Nakhimovskaya	4	1958-59, 1961–62
7	Vija Rožlapa	4	1967, 1971–72, 1974
8	Tatjana Voronova	4	1980, 1985–87
9	Dana Reizniece	4	1998-2001
10	Astra Goldmane	3	1975, 1981, 1983
11	Ingrīda Priedīte	2	1973, 1979
12	Ilze Rubene	2	1976, 1995
13	Ingūna Erneste	2	1989, 2002
14	Marija Kuznecova	2	2025–26
