= Benita Vēja =

Latvian chess player (born 1948)

Personal information
- Born: January 15, 1948 (age 78) Kuldīga, Latvia

Chess career
- Country: Latvia

Benita Vēja (née Vilerte, born January 15, 1948, in Kuldīga) is a Latvian chess master who won the Latvian Chess Championship for women in 1966.

== Chess career ==
Benita Vēja started playing chess in early childhood and won the Latvian Girl championship in 1961. In 1963, she wonthe Soviet Girl championship. She won the Rīga women's chess championship twice, in 1972 and 1975. She won the Latvian Chess Championship for women in 1966, defeating the leading Latvian women chess leader Astra Klovāne with a score of 2.5:1.5. Vēja was the runner-up in 1963 and 1972, and she earned third prizes in 1964, 1967, and 1969. She represented Latvia in the Soviet team chess championship in 1967 and 1972 and played for the team "Daugava" in Soviet team chess cup in 1964, 1966, 1968, and 1971. In the 1967 Soviet team chess championship, she secured second place on the girl's board, and in the 1971 Soviet Team Chess Cup, she achieved third place on the first women's board.

== Personal life ==
By profession, Benita Vēja is an engineer mathematician. Her brother, Jānis Vilerts (1943–2001) was the director of the Kuldiga Chess School, and her sister, Tamāra Vilerte is a Woman Grandmaster.
