= Valerij Zhuravliov =

Latvian chess player (1938–2021)

Personal information
- Full name: Valerij Ivanovich Zhuravliov
- Born: December 11, 1938 Moscow, USSR
- Died: July 18, 2021 (aged 82) Jelgava, Latvia

Chess career
- Country: Soviet Union → Latvia
- Title: International Master (1963)
- Peak rating: 2490 (January 1978)

Valerij Ivanovich Zhuravliov (Russian: Валерий Иванович Журавлёв, Latvian: Valērijs Žuravļovs; December 11, 1938 – July 18, 2021) was a Soviet/Latvian chess master who has won the Latvian Chess Championship three times. He held the FIDE title of International Master (IM).

== Chess career ==
Valerij Zhuravliov won the Latvian Championship in 1980, 1992, and 1994. In 1968 he shared first place with Jānis Klovāns but lost an additional match, and twice finished second (1984, 1988).

In 1967 Zhuravliov won the Championship of "Dinamo" in Sochi and reached eighth place in the 35th USSR Chess Championship in Kharkov.

In seventies Zhuravliov lived in Kaliningrad. In 1972 he shared first places in Championship of Soviet Army (with Semyon Furman), in Championship of Armed Forces (with Jānis Klovāns), and in 1977 won Russian Chess Championship in Volgograd (shared first place with Lev Psakhis). In 1977 he participated in Mikhail Chigorin memorial in Sochi.

He played for Latvia in the Soviet team chess championship in 1962 and 1969, and for the Latvian team "Riga Chess & Draughts Club" in the Soviet team chess cup in 1990.

He played for Latvia in the Chess Olympiads:

- In 1994, at first reserve board in the 31st Chess Olympiad in Moscow (+2 −1 =2).

Valerij Zhuravliov played for Latvia in European Team Chess Championship:

- In 1992, at third board in Debrecen (+2 −2 =4).

In the last years of his life he lived near Rēzekne and still participated in Latvian team competitions.
