= Zara Nakhimovskaya =

Latvian chess player (born 1934)

Personal information
- Full name: Zāra Nahimovska
- Born: 6 June 1934 (age 92) Daugavpils, Latvia

Chess career
- Country: Latvia; Soviet Union; United States

Zara Nakhimovskaya (Kavnatsky) (Latvian: Zāra Nahimovska or Zāra Kavnacka; born 6 June 1934) is a Latvian chess player. She won the Latvian Chess Championship for women in 1958, 1959, 1961, and 1962.

== Chess career ==
Zara Nakhimovskaya achieved excellent results during 1950 - 1960 period when she lived in Soviet-occupied Latvia. Zara Nakhimovskaya played for the Latvian SSR in Soviet Team juniors chess championships in Leningrad in 1951 at second girls board and won first place (6½ out of 9). She played in Latvian Chess Championship for women finals in:

- 1954 (2nd place, lost additional match to Milda Lauberte),
- 1955 (8th place),
- 1956 (2nd place),
- 1958 (1st place),
- 1959 (1st place),
- 1960 (3rd place),
- 1961 (1st place),
- 1962 (1st place),
- 1964 (2nd place),
- 1966 (3rd place),
- 1967 (5th place),
- 1968 (5th place),
- 1969 (2nd place).

She has also played successfully in the Women's Soviet Chess Championships and won the Half-Final in Irkutsk in 1961. She reached Women's Soviet Chess Championship finals in 1959, 1962, 1963.

Zara Nakhimovskaya played for the Latvian SSR in Soviet Team chess championships in 1955 (at second women board), 1958 (at first women board), 1959 (at first women board), 1960 (at second women board), 1962 (at first women board). She also played in the Soviet Team chess cup for team "Daugava" in 1954 (at second women board), 1961 (at first women board), 1964 (at first women board), 1968 (at first women board).

== Personal life ==
Nakhimovskaya is of Latvian Jewish descent. In January 1978 Zara Nakhimovskaya immigrated to the United States with her husband Valentīns Kavnackis (Valentin Kavnatsky) who is also a Master-level chess player and son Jevgēņijs (Yevgeny) and retired from an active chess life. Zara Nakhimovskaya is graduate the Riga Medical Institute and worked as pharmacist. Currently she lives in West Bloomfield Township, Michigan. Nakhimovskaya has filed two patents for lubricants in 1991-1992 using her married name.
