= Rubene =

Rubene could refer to:

- Rubene Parish, a parish in Jēkabpils Municipality, Latvia
- Rubene (floorball club), a Latvian Floorball League team
- Ilze Rubene (1958–2002), Latvian chess player
- Nora Ikstena (née Rubene; 1969–2026), Latvian writer
