= Normunds Miezis =

Latvian chess grandmaster (born 1971)

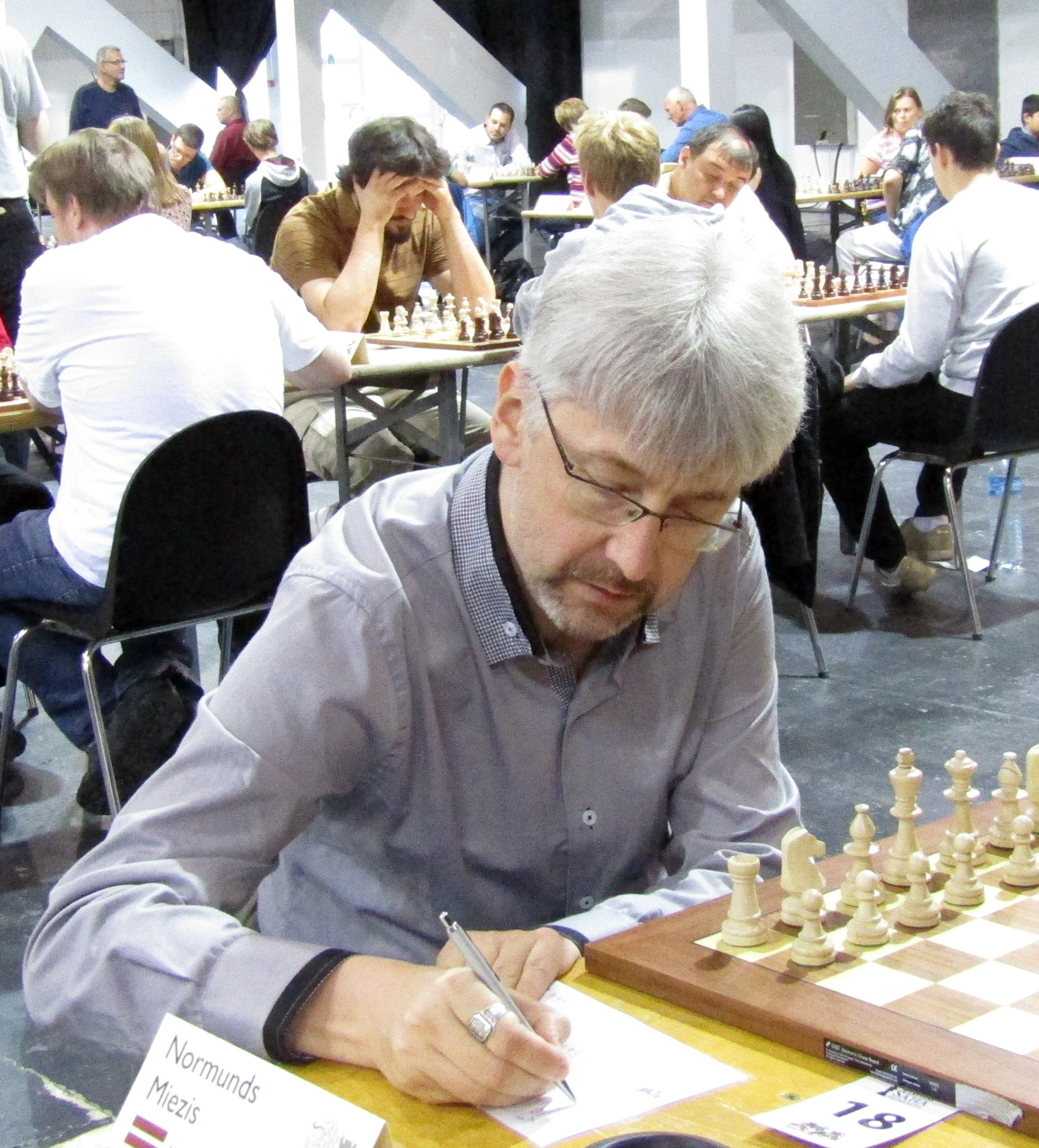
- Miezis in 2016

Personal information
- Born: 11 May 1971 (age 55)

Chess career
- Country: Latvia
- Title: Grandmaster (1997)
- FIDE rating: 2411 (July 2026)
- Peak rating: 2601 (January 2001)

Normunds Miezis (born 11 May 1971) is a Latvian chess Grandmaster (1997).

== Chess career ==
He won the Latvian Chess Championship in 1991 and 2006. He played for Latvia in the Chess Olympiads of 1998, 2000, 2002, 2004, 2006, 2008, 2010, 2012 and 2014. Other notable results include shared 1st with Eduardas Rozentalis, Sergey Ivanov, Tomi Nybäck and Evgeny Postny at Stockholm, Rilton Cup 2005/6, shared 6th with Slavko Cicak, Joel Benjamin and Alexander Baburin in the European Union Championship of 2005, won Kaupthing Bank Chess Tournament GM-Section in 2007, 2nd–3rd with Arturs Neikšāns in Kaunas 2009 and 2nd behind Alexei Shirov in the Aivars Gipslis Memorial in Riga. In 2011, he won the Västerås Open with 7.5 points out of 8 games. In 2020, he won the Offerspill Nordic Invitational with 7 points out of 9 games, after winning the tiebreaker with Jonas Buhl Bjerre.

== Chess strength ==
His best single performance was at Istanbul ol (Men), 2000, where he scored 6.5 of 11 possible points (69%) against 2573-rated opposition, for a performance rating of 2618. Another remarkable tournament for him is the 14th Dubai Open 2012 where he scored 7 of 9 possible points finishing shared 1st with Ni Hua, Baadur Jobava, Mikheil Mchedlishvili and Chanda Sandipan with a performance rating of 2709.

In the October 2013 FIDE list, he has an Elo rating of 2550, making him Latvia's number four.

== Notable games ==
- Alexei Barsov vs Normunds Miezis, NRW-Liga II 1995, Benoni Defense: Modern. Snake Variation (A60), 0-1
- Alexei Fedorov vs Normunds Miezis, 34th Olympiad 2000, Sicilian Defense: Kan Variation (B43), 0-1
- Evgeny Solozhenkin vs Normunds Miezis, Classics GM 2001, Budapest Defense: Rubinstein Variation (A52), 0-1
- Normunds Miezis vs Robert Fontaine, XXXV Rilton Cup 2006, English Opening: King's English (A22), 1-0
