= Zigfrīds =

Male given name

- Gender: Male
- Name day: 13 June

Origin
- Origin: From the Germanic given name Siegfried, composed of the elements sig (victory) and frithu (protection, peace).
- Region of origin: Latvia

Other names
- Related names: Siegfried

Zigfrīds is a Latvian masculine given name derived from the Germanic given name Siegfried. People bearing the name Zigfrīds include:

- Zigfrīds Anna Meierovics (1887–1925), Latvian politician and diplomat
- Zigfrīds Račiņš (1936–1998), Latvian singer
- Zigfrīds Solmanis (1913–1984), Latvia chess master
