= Arturs Neikšāns =

Latvian chess grandmaster (born 1983)

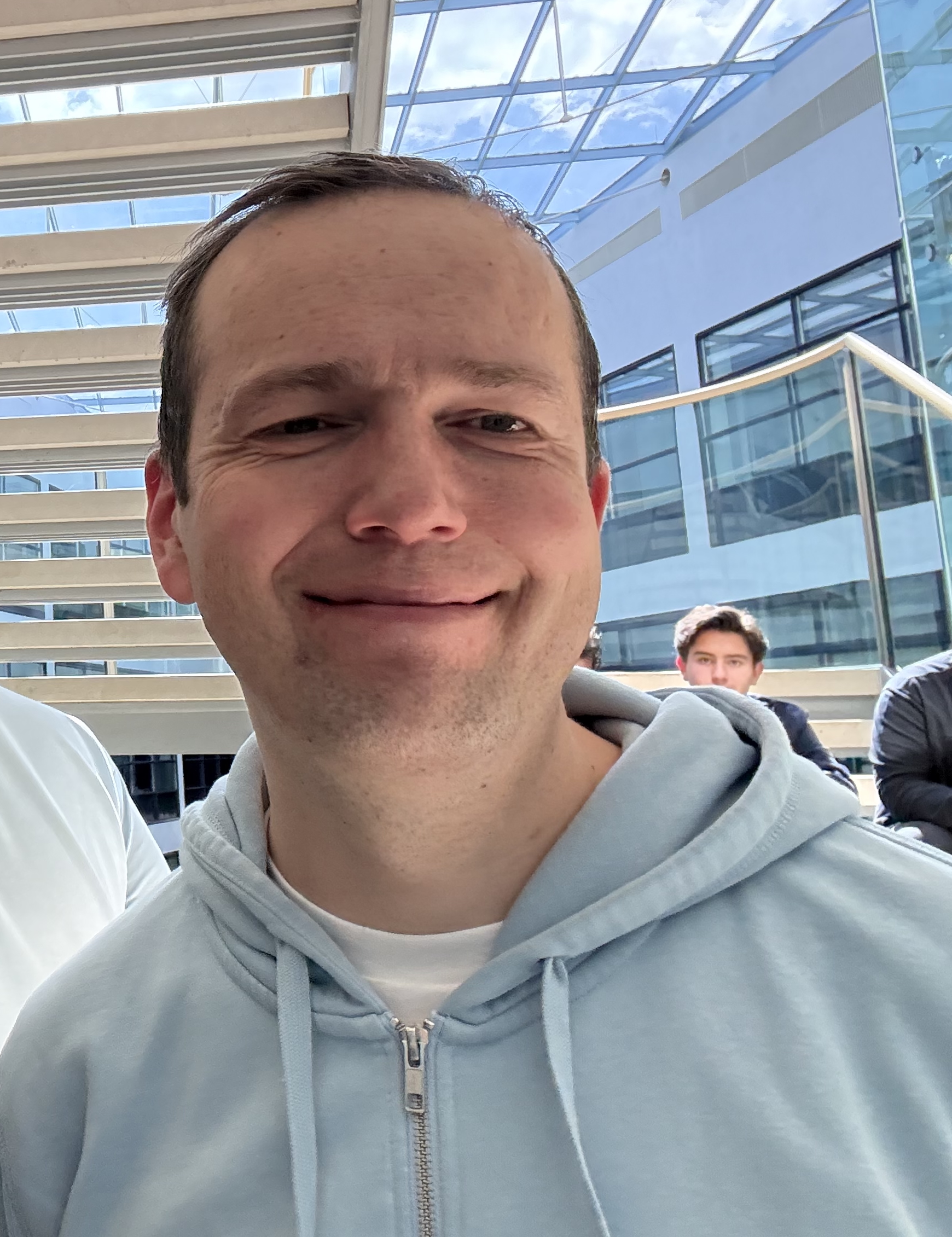
- Neikšāns in 2026

Personal information
- Born: 16 March 1983 (age 43) Valka, Latvia

Chess career
- Country: Latvia
- Title: Grandmaster (2012)
- FIDE rating: 2557 (November 2026)
- Peak rating: 2631 (December 2016)

Arturs Neikšāns (born 16 March 1983) is a Latvian chess grandmaster. He is a five-time Latvian champion, one of the leading Latvian chess players, a FIDE-accredited chess trainer, author and a commentator of high-level chess tournaments.

== Biography ==
Born in Valka (a small Latvian bordertown with Estonia), Neikšāns started to play chess relatively late for an eventual grandmaster, being 9 years old upon learning the game. At age 16, he received the title of a national master, and at age 18 he was ranked as an international master. In 1999, being only 16 years old, Neikšāns won the Latvian Chess Championship, thus becoming the youngest-ever Latvian champion. He beat Mikhail Tal's record, which was set in 1953, by several months.

After graduating from high school, Neikšāns essentially left competitive chess, and after receiving an MBA Master's degree in Public Relations, he mostly worked in the field of communications, most notably the Latvian Ministry of Education and Science. He later also worked at the newspaper Jelgavas Vestnesis. At age 27, he was offered the position of head chess coach in the Riga Chess School. He continued the interrupted work of the Latvian grandmaster Jānis Klovāns, who had just died at the age of 75. Every day, Neikšāns, who was still an IM at the time, would work on his chess. He needed slightly more than one year to get all of the required three grandmaster norms, thus getting the coveted title at the age of 28, which for professional chess players is considered to be quite late. In 2012, he received the FIDE trainer's title as well, and in 2016, his Elo rating peaked at 2631.

== Personal achievements ==
- Qualified for FIDE World Cup 2025
- Five-time Latvian champion (1999, 2011, 2015, 2019, 2025)
- Summer Chess Classic C tournament, USA – 1st place (2019)
- Ilmar Raud Memorial, Estonia – 1st place (2015, 2020)
- President's 2nd Cup, Riga – 1st place (2019)
- RTU Open 2016 A tournament, Riga – shared 1st place, 3rd in tiebreaks (2016)
- Liepājas Rokāde 2016, super tournament, Liepāja – shared 1st place, 2nd in tiebreaks
- 5th Vladimir Petrov memorial, Jūrmala shared 1st place with Vasyl Ivanchuk, Loek van Wely and Alexander Shabalov, 4th in tiebreaks
- 9th Wunsiedel Chess Festival, Germany – 1st place (2015)
- Liepājas Rokāde 2009, open tournament, Liepāja – 1st place (2009)
- Seven times played for the national team of Latvia in the World Chess Olympiads (2000, 2006, 2012, 2014, 2016, 2018, 2024)
- Two times played for the national team of Latvia in European Team Chess Championships (1999, 2011)
- Participant of FIDE Grand Swiss Tournament 2021

== Coaching ==
From 2010 to 2021, Arturs Neikšāns was the head coach at Riga Chess School, on a daily basis working with the most talented Latvian youngsters, among them Nikita Meshkovs, Toms Kantāns, Laura Rogule, Katrina Amerika (Skinke), Elizabete Limanovska, Dmitrijs Tokranovs and others. Many of them later would become grandmasters themselves and the core of the Latvian national team. He left the job in late October 2021 just before the start of FIDE Chess.com Grand Swiss.

Neikšāns still does coaching, providing private lessons. He coached YouTuber and International Master Levy Rozman, also known as GothamChess.

== Author ==
In 2018, Neikšāns started a collaboration with one of the leading online chess education portals Modern Chess, eventually producing four popular theoretical databases:

- Moscow Variation against the Sicilian – Complete Repertoire against 2...d6
- Rossolimo Variation against the Sicilian – Complete Repertoire against 2...Nc6
- Baltic variation against the Sicilian – Complete Repertoire against 2...e6 and sidelines
- Positional Repertoire against the Caro-Kann

Right after Neikšāns switched to writing courses for Chessable, publishing his first course in July 2021. Ever since he's produced a total of five theoretical courses.

- Lifetime Repertoires: Reversed Sicilian
- Lifetime Repertoires: Kan Sicilian (co-authored by Igor Kovalenko), nominated for Chessable Awards 2022
- 100 Repertoires: King's Indian Attack, nominated for Chessable Awards 2023
- Leningrad Dutch: Simplified, nominated for Chessable Awards 2024
- The Battle-Tested Scandinavian Defense, once again cooperating with Igor Kovalenko
