= Inguna =

- Gender: Female
- Name day: June 26

Origin
- Region of origin: Latvia

Other names
- Related names: Inguns

Inguna or Ingūna is a Latvian feminine given name. The name day of persons named Inguna is June 26.

Notable people named Inguna include:

- Ingūna Butāne (born 1986), Latvian model sometimes simply known as Inguna
- Ingūna Erneste (born 1966), Latvian chess Woman Grandmaster
- Inguna Sudraba (born 1964), Latvian politician
