= Zigfrīds Solmanis =

Personal information
- Full name: Zigfrīds Aleksandrs Otto Solmanis
- Born: July 9, 1913 Riga, Latvia
- Died: September 6, 1984 (aged 71) Jūrmala, Latvia

Chess career
- Country: Latvia

Zigfrīds Aleksandrs Otto Solmanis (July 9, 1913, Riga – September 6, 1984, Jūrmala) was a Latvian chess player.

== Chess career ==
Zigfrīds Solmanis started to play chess at the age of 6. From him earliest youth participated in various tournaments and other events related to chess. He stood out with his aggressive style of play. In 1938, Solmanis won the Latvian Chess Club tournament and in 1939 he participated at the second Ķemeri International chess tournament. Solmanis was a very good speed chess player having won over 70 such tournaments. In 1938 he visited 25 cities in Latvia and gave simultaneous exhibitions with a very good result 74 percent. After the Second World War, Solmanis actively involved in reconstruction of Latvian chess life. He was a triple champion in chess in Jurmala and in 1947 won Latvian Chess Championship. In 1947 he took third place in Quarterfinal of Championship of USSR in Tbilisi, after the next world champion Tigran Petrosian. In 1948 he represented Latvian team at the first table in the USSR team championship semi-finals in Riga. Until 1964 he almost every year participated in the Latvian Chess Championship finals.

== Chess manager ==
In 1959 after establishing the Latvian magazine "Šahs", he actively participated in its making. Until 1965, Solmanis was the magazine editor in chief for Latvian edition but him reporter activity is not stopped until his death. The sixties and seventies worked as a coach, one of his student is Latvian chess champion Anda Šafranska. In the eighties made grandmasters Mikhail Tal and Aivars Gipslis chess school organization, which was a later chess grandmasters Aleksander Wojtkiewicz, Alexander Shabalov and Alexei Shirov. In recent years, Solmanis has devoted much time Jūrmala chess life's development. He was a local chess club head, and a lot of time invested in the annual chess festival organization.
