= Vija =

Female given name

- Gender: Female
- Name day: 5 April

Origin
- Region of origin: Latvia

Vija is a Latvian feminine given name. Individuals bearing the name Vija include:

- Vija Artmane (1929–2008), Latvian actress
- Vija Celmins (born 1938), Latvian-American visual artist
- Vija Rožlapa (born 1942), Latvian chess player
- Vija Vētra (1923–2026), Latvian dancer and choreographer
