= Veja =

Veja may refer to:

== Places ==
- Veja, a town in Lazio, central Italy; now Vejano comune
- Veja, a village in Stănița Commune, Neamț County, Romania
- Veja River, Romania
- Veja State, a former princely state in present Gujarat, western India

== Persons ==
- Benita Vēja (born 1948), Latvian chess player

== Other ==
- Veja Diena, a Latvian festival
- Veja (magazine), a Brazilian weekly newsmagazine
- Veja (brand), a brand of fair trade sneakers
