= Vladimir Kirpichnikov =

Vladimir Kirpichnikov may refer to:

- Vladimir Kirpichnikov (chess player)
- Vladimir Kirpichnikov (general)
