= Tatiana Voronova =

Latvian chess player (born 1955)

Personal information
- Full name: Tatiana Vasilyevna Voronova
- Born: December 24, 1955 (age 70) Arkhangelsk Oblast, Russian Soviet Federative Socialist Republic

Chess career
- Country: Latvia
- Title: Woman International Master (1993)
- FIDE rating: 2164 (January 2019)
- Peak rating: 2287 (January 2001)

Tatiana Vasilyevna Voronova (Russian: Татьяна Васильевна Воронова, Latvian: Tatjana Voronova; born December 24, 1955, in Arkhangelsk Oblast, Russian Soviet Federative Socialist Republic) is a Soviet/Latvian chess player who holds the FiDE title of Woman International Master (1993). She won the Latvian Chess Championship for women in 1980, 1985, 1986, and 1987.

== Chess career ==
Tatiana Voronova started to play chess at the age of 14 but progressed rapidly. In 1978 she won a bronze medal in the Women's Soviet Chess Championship in Nikolayev. In 1980 played for Latvian team "Daugava" in Soviet Team Chess Cup First league in Rostov-on-Don she shown the best women board results - 4,5 from 5. During the period from 1980 to 2006 Tatiana Voronova participated in Latvian women's chess championships. She won this tournament four times: in 1980, 1985, 1986 and 1987. In 1982, 1998, 1999, 2000 and 2003 she obtained a second place, and she came in third place six times: in 1993, 1994, 1996, 1997, 2001 and 2006.

Tatiana Voronova played for Latvia in Soviet Team chess championships:

- In 1979, at first women board in the 14th Soviet Team Chess Championship in Moscow (+2 −2 =4);
- In 1981, at first women board in the 15th Soviet Team Chess Championship in Moscow (+2 −4 =3);

Tatiana Voronova played for Latvia in Chess Olympiads:

- In 1994, at first reserve board in the 31st Chess Olympiad in Moscow (+5 −0 =4);
- In 1996, at first reserve board in the 32nd Chess Olympiad in Yerevan (+4 −1 =5);
- In 1998, at second board in the 33rd Chess Olympiad in Elista (+3 −2 =6);
- In 2000, at second board in the 34th Chess Olympiad in Istanbul (+5 −3 =4).

Tatiana Voronova played for Latvia in European Team Chess Championship (women):

- In 1997, at reserve board in 2nd European Team Chess Championship (women) in Pula (+4 −1 =2);
- In 2001, at second board in 4th European Team Chess Championship (women) in León (+1 −2 =2).

In 1978 Tatjana Voronova has graduated from the Russian Institute of Physical Culture and works as a trainer.
