= Mark Pasman =

Latvian chess player (1932–2011)

Personal information
- Born: March 16, 1932 Riga, Latvia
- Died: August 4, 2011 (aged 79)

Chess career
- Country: Latvia

Mark Pasman (Latvian: Marks Pasmans; March 16, 1932 in Riga, Latvia – August 4, 2011) was a Latvian chess player who won the Latvian Chess Championship in 1951.

== Chess career ==
Pasman learned to play chess at the age of 14 and in 1951 he won the Latvian Chess Championship. Other results in the Latvian Chess Championship: 1949 – 14th, 1950 – 4th, 1952 – 2nd, 1953 – 5th, 1954 – 5th, 1961 – 9th. In 1958 he won the Riga Chess Championship and he won the Soviet "Dinamo" championship in 1964.

Pasman played for Latvia in the Soviet Team chess championships in 1953 (+0 −2 =5), 1958 (+2 −4 =2), and 1960 (5 out of 7). He also played in the Soviet Team chess cup for teams "Daugava" in 1954 (+3 −5 =2) and "Dinamo" in 1968 (+1 −5 =3). Despite such impressive results, Pasman did not manage to obtain the Master title. Pasman was a graduate of the University of Latvia.
