= Vladimir Lazarev =

Russian-French chess grandmaster (born 1964)

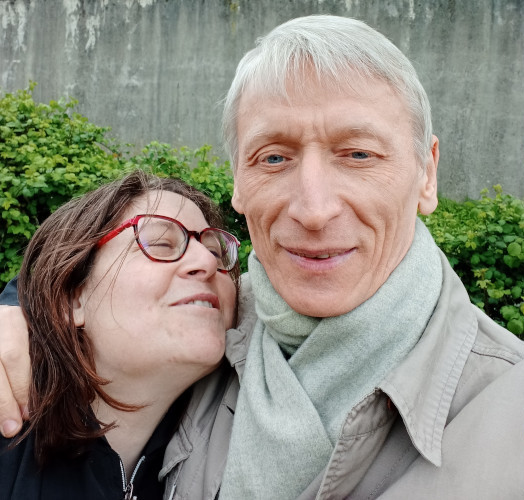

Personal information
- Born: 5 June 1964 (age 62) Saratov, Russian SFSR, Soviet Union
- Spouse: Anda Šafranska

Chess career
- Country: Soviet Union → Russia (before 2000); France (after 2000)
- Title: Grandmaster (2000)
- FIDE rating: 2481 (October 2026)
- Peak rating: 2536 (April 2004)

Vladimir Lazarev (Russian: Владимир Лазарев; born 5 June 1964 in Saratov, Russian SFSR, Soviet Union) is a Russian chess Grandmaster, now living in France.

== Biography ==
After learning to play chess at fifteen, Vladimir Lazarev joined the chess club in his hometown, Saratov and progressed quickly under the direction of Master of Sport of the USSR Alexander Astashin. He won the title of International Master in 1991 and played many tournaments in Russia, with a prestigious victory in 1993 against Alexander Morozevich. Lazarev married Latvian born chess player Anda Šafranska (WGM). The couple moved to France in Lyon and later to Paris. He was awarded the Grandmaster title in 2000. Lazarev has now turned to coaching young chess players in Villepinte, but continues to play a few tournaments.

== Notable tournaments ==
- Winner of the tournament Alushta (1993)
- Winner of the International Open Lyon (1999, 2000)
- Winner of the International Open Lausanne (2004)
- Winner of the Open Rhône (2007)
- Second place in International Open Positano (2005)
- Third place in Open the Rhône (2005)
- Winner of the International Lugano Open (2005)
- Third place in International Open Monti, (Sardinia) (2005)
