= Pļaviņas =

Town in Aizkraukle Municipality, Latvia

- Town
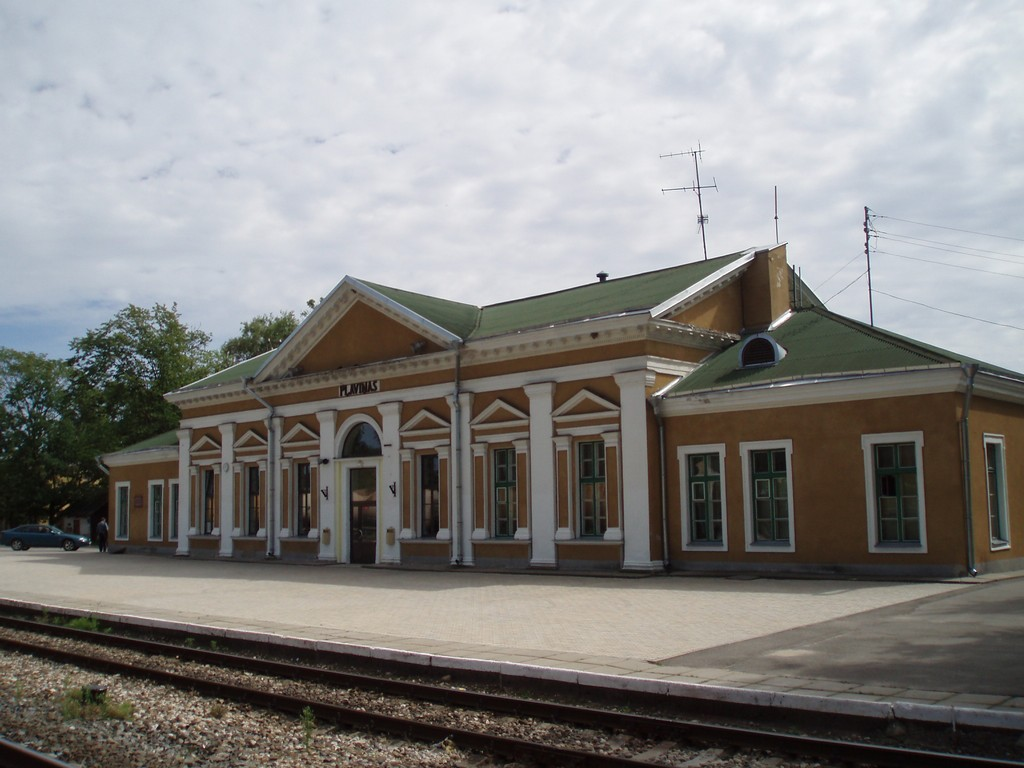
- Pļaviņas train station

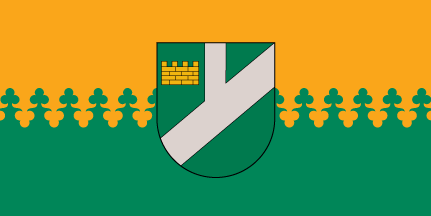
- Flag Coat of arms

- Location in Latvia
- Coordinates: 56°36′N 25°43′E
- Country: Latvia
- Municipality: Aizkraukle Municipality
- Town rights: 1927

Area
  - Total: 7.03 km^{2} (2.71 sq mi)
  - Land: 5.65 km^{2} (2.18 sq mi)
  - Water: 1.38 km^{2} (0.53 sq mi)

Population (2026)
  - Total: 2,835
  - Density: 502/km^{2} (1,300/sq mi)
- Time zone: UTC+2 (EET)
  - Summer (DST): UTC+3 (EEST)
- Postal code: LV-512(0-1)
- Calling code: +371 651
- Website: http://www.plavinas.lv/

Pļaviņas (German: Stockmannshof) is a town in Aizkraukle Municipality in Latvia. The town is located on the Daugava river. The population in 2020 was 2,974. Latvian law defines the town of Pļaviņas as belonging partly to the Vidzeme region and partly to Latgale.

== History ==
Town rights were granted on April 26, 1927, simultaneously with the incorporation of the neighboring settlement of Gostiņi into Pļaviņas. However, in 1930, at the request of the residents, Gostiņi was excluded from the town limits.

In 1949, during the second Soviet occupation of Latvia, the city became a district center. It housed the executive committee, district court and prosecutor's office, financial department, and a bank. In 1956, Gostiņi was once again incorporated into the town. In 1959, the district was dissolved.

== See also ==
- List of cities and towns in Latvia
- Pļaviņas Municipality
