= Nina Serbina =

Soviet-Ukrainian high jumper

Medal record

Women's athletics

Representing the Soviet Union

IAAF World Cup
Bronze medal – third place	1979 Montreal	High jump

Nina Serbina (Ukrainian: Ніна Сербіна; born 21 July 1951) is a Ukrainian former high jumper who competed for the Soviet Union. She was a bronze medallist at the 1979 IAAF World Cup, held in Montreal, with a jump of 1.90 m (6 ft 2 3/4 in). Her lifetime best of 1.96 m (6 ft 5 in) was set in 1980 in Chernihiv.

Serbina was among the most highly ranked athletes during her career, being the sixth best performer in the world in 1979 then the fourth best of 1980 (third in Europe).

She is married to professional Latvian chess player Zigurds Lanka.
