= Māris Krakops =

Latvian chess Grandmaster (born 1978)

Personal information
- Born: April 3, 1978 (age 48) then part of Latvian SSR, Soviet Union

Chess career
- Title: Grandmaster (1998)
- FIDE rating: 2510 (September 2026)
- Peak rating: 2530 (January 2002)

Māris Krakops (born April 3, 1978) is a Latvian chess player who holds the FIDE title of Grandmaster (1998).

Māris Krakops started real chess career in 1992 when he participated in Open Junior Championship of USSR in Jūrmala. In 1994 he placed second in the Junior World Championship under 16 in Szeged, Hungary (after Peter Leko). In 1994 he achieved the International Master title. Then, in 1995, Māris Krakops was 8th in the World Junior Chess Championship U-18 in Guarapuava, Brazil and again he placed 8th in the World Junior Chess Championship U-20 in Siófok, Hungary. Māris Krakops won the Latvian Chess Championship in 1998. In 2000 he won Troll Masters in Gausdal, Norway but in 2001 was second in Patras, Greece. In 2001 Māris Krakops won second place at third board in 13th European Team Chess Championship in León.

Māris Krakops played for Latvia in Chess Olympiads:

- In 1998, at second board in the 33rd Chess Olympiad in Elista (+6, =3, -2);
- In 2000, at second board in the 34th Chess Olympiad in Istanbul (+2, =3, -2);
- In 2002, at fourth board in the 35th Chess Olympiad in Bled (+3, =1, -2).

Māris Krakops played for Latvia in European Team Chess Championship:

- In 1997, at reserve board in Pula (+2, =5, -0);
- In 1999, at second board in Batumi (+2, =4, -3);
- In 2001, at third board in León (+5, =1, -2).

Since 2003 he has rarely participated in chess tournaments. By profession Māris Krakops is a lawyer.

In August 2019, Māris Krakops became President of the Latvian Chess Federation. In March 2022, Māris Krakops resigned as President of the Latvian Chess Federation, where he worked for two and a half years.
