= Anatolijs Šmits =

Latvian chess player

Personal information
- Born: September 2, 1941 Pskov region, Russia, USSR
- Died: January 30, 1998 (aged 56) Riga, Latvia

Chess career
- Country: Latvia
- FIDE rating: 2345 (July 1997)
- Peak rating: 2420 (January 1978)

Anatolijs Šmits (September 2, 1941 – January 30, 1998), also known as Anatols Šmits or Anatoly Shmit, was a Latvian chess player.

Šmits won the Soviet Junior Championship in 1960 and was Latvian Chess Champion in 1969 and 1975. He also gained second place in Cup of USSR in 1970 (after David Bronstein).

Šmits played for Latvia in Soviet team competitions:

- In 1960, at seventh board in 7th Soviet Team Chess Championship in Moscow (4,5 from 8);
- In 1961, at seventh board in 3rd Soviet Team Chess Cup in Moscow (+2, =2, -1);
- In 1967, at fourth board in 10th Soviet Team Chess Championship in Moscow (+3, =4, -2);
- In 1969, at third board in 11th Soviet Team Chess Championship in Grozny (5,5 from 8);
- In 1972, at fourth board in 12th Soviet Team Chess Championship in Moscow (+2, =4, -1);
- In 1975, at fourth board in 13th Soviet Team Chess Championship in Rīga (+2, =3, -2).

Šmits was an excellent teacher as exemplified by his coaching for the World Championship match of Nona Gaprindashvili against Nana Alexandria of Georgia at Pitsunda/Tbilisi 1975, which Nona Gaprindashvili won. For this effort, Smits received a special prize in 1975 from the Georgian Chess Federation.
