= Rolands Bērziņš =

Latvian chess player (born 1975)

Personal information
- Born: January 14, 1975 (age 51) Riga, Latvia

Chess career
- Country: Latvia
- Title: International Master (1993)
- Peak rating: 2478 (July 2001)

Rolands Bērziņš (also Roland Berzinsh; born January 14, 1975, in Riga) is a Latvian chess player who holds the FIDE title of International Master (1993). He is a Latvian Chess Championship winner (2021).

== Chess career ==
Rolands Bērziņš won the gold medal in Latvian Chess Championship in 2021, silver medal in 2003 (tournament won Evgeny Sveshnikov) and bronze medal in 2002 (tournament won Ilmārs Starostīts).

Rolands Bērziņš played for Latvia in European Team Chess Championship:

- In 1992, at reserve board in Debrecen (+1, =5, -1);

Rolands Bērziņš played for Latvia in Chess Olympiads:

- In 2002, at first reserve board in the 35th Chess Olympiad in Bled (+2, =3, -5).

Rolands Bērziņš successfully played in following International Chess tournaments:

- In 1998, 1st in Prievidza (Slovakia);
- In 1999, 1st in Bern (Switzerland);
- In 1999, 2nd in Tampere (Finland);
- In 2000, 2nd in Hamburg (Germany);
- In 2000, 1st in Norderstedt (Germany).

Rolands Bērziņš is a graduate from the University of Latvia with a degree in psychology.

== Notable games ==
- Roland Berzinsh vs Josef Pribyl Czech Extra League 2000-1 2001 Closed position cracking with sacrifice.
- Roland Berzinsh vs Viesturs Meijers Latvia 1995 Very interesting miniature.
- Eduard Meduna vs Roland Berzinsh Czech Extra League 2000-1 2001 Endgame with stalemate.
