= Vladimir Kirpichnikov (chess player) =

Latvian chess player (born 1948)

Personal information
- Born: Vladimir Samuilovich Kirpichnikov; July 4, 1948 (age 78) Riga, Latvia

Chess career
- Country: Latvia
- Title: FIDE Master (2023)
- FIDE rating: 2349 (July 2013)
- Peak rating: 2490 (January 1975)

Vladimir Samuilovich Kirpichnikov (Russian: Владимир Самуилович Кирпичников, Latvian: Vladimirs Kirpičņikovs; born July 4, 1948, in Riga) is a Soviet/Latvian chess FIDE Master (FM, 2023) who won the Latvian Chess Championship in 1974.

== Chess career ==
Vladimir Kirpichnikov started to play chess at the age of 10. He achieved Soviet chess master title in 1968. In 1974 he shared first place with Juzefs Petkēvičs in Latvian Chess Championship and later both were declared champions. In 1977 he won the Latvian master national tournament and participated in the next year international tournament in Jūrmala. Vladimir Kirpichnikov played for Latvia in Soviet Team chess championships:

- In 1967, at boy board in the 10th Soviet Team chess championship in Moscow (+1 −2 =6);
- In 1975, at seventh board in the 13th Soviet Team chess championship in Riga (+0 −1 =4).

Vladimir Kirpichnikov played for Latvian team "Daugava" in Soviet Team chess cup:

- In 1968, at second boy board in the 6th Soviet Team chess cup in Riga (+4 −4 =3);
- In 1971, at fifth board in the 7th Soviet Team chess cup in Rostov-on-Don 4 from 6 (third place at board);
- In 1974, at third board in the 8th Soviet Team chess cup in Moscow (+3 −1 =5);
- In 1976, at third board in the 9th Soviet Team chess cup in Tbilisi (+0 −4 =2).
