= Teodors Bergs =

Latvian chess player

Teodors Bergs (Theodore Berg) (27 July 1902, in Riga – 3 October 1966, in Riga) was a Latvian chess master.

In 1926, he took 2nd, behind Vladimirs Petrovs, and shared 2nd, behind Fricis Apšenieks in Riga. He took 3rd at Riga 1930 (Movsas Feigins won). In 1932, he took 2nd, behind Petrovs, at the Riga championship.

He shared 3rd, behind Paul Felix Schmidt and Paul Keres, at Tallinn (Reval) 1935. He took 14th at Kemeri 1937 (Salo Flohr, Petrovs and Samuel Reshevsky won). In 1937, he also took 4th in Riga (Quadrangular, Paul List won). In 1940, he won national tournament in Riga. He tied for 6–7th at Riga 1941 (LAT-ch, Alexander Koblencs won).

He introduced the Berg Variation (1.d4 Nf6 2.Nf3 b6 3.g3 Bb7 4.Bg2 c5 5.c4 cxd4 6.Qxd4) in the Queen's Indian, Marienbad system (A47).
