= Marija Kuznecova =

Latvian chess player (born 2010)

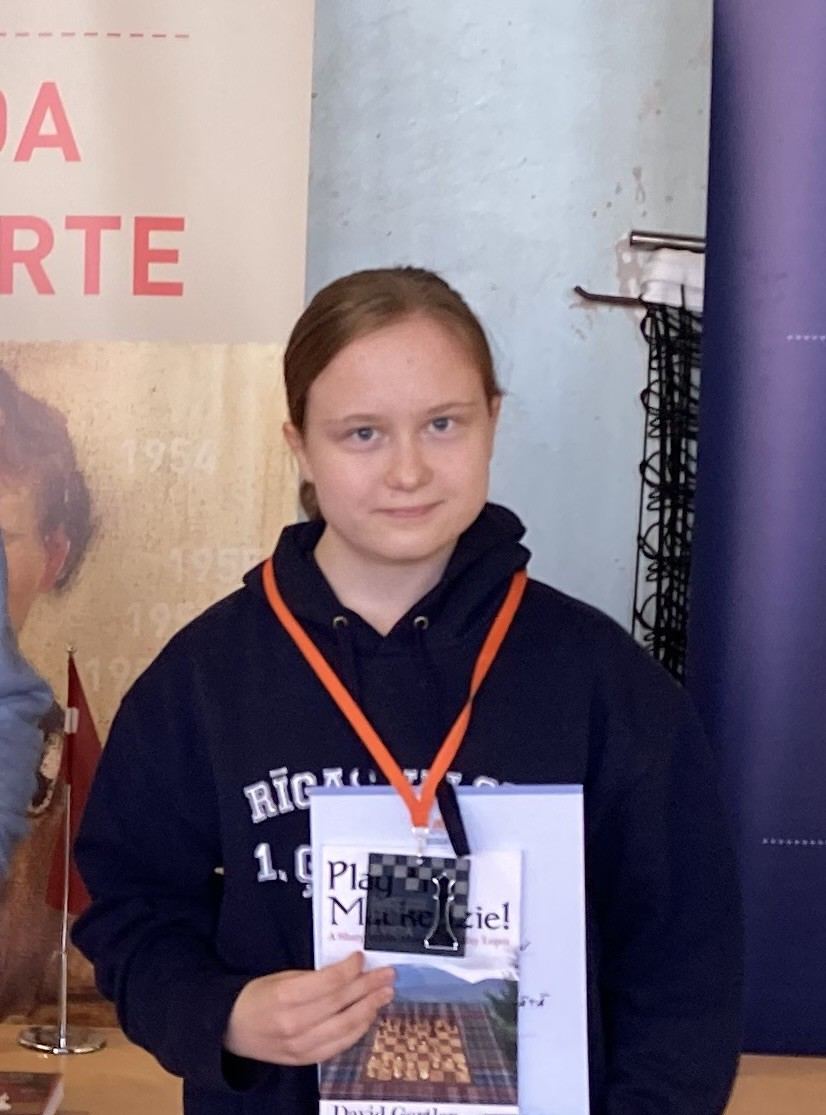
- Kuznecova in 2025

Personal information
- Born: 2010 (age 15–16)

Chess career
- Country: Latvia
- Title: FIDE Master (2025); Woman FIDE Master (2024)
- Peak rating: 2314 (November 2025)

Marija Kuznecova (born 2010) is a Latvian chess player who holds the title of FIDE Master. She won the Latvian Women Chess Championship in 2025 adn 2026.

== Biography ==
Kuznecova was born in 2010. She is a student of Riga Chess School. She has won the Latvian Youth Chess Championships multiple times, in various girls' age groups: in 2019 in the G10 age group, 2020 in the G10 age group, 2024 in the G14 age group, and 2025 in the G16 age group.

Kuznecova has represented Latvia several times at the European Youth Chess Championships and World Youth Chess Championships. In 2018, she ranked in 7th place in the girls' G8 age group at the World Youth Chess Championship. In the same year, at the European Youth Chess Championship held in Riga, she took the highest place among all Latvian participants, when she ranked 14th in the girls' G8 age group. In 2019, she placed 15th at the World Youth Chess Championship in the girls' G10 age group. In 2024, she was 9th in the European Youth Chess Championship in the girls' G14 age group. In October 2025, Durrës she won a silver medal in the girls' G16 age group at the World Youth Chess Championship.

Since 2019, Kuznecova has regularly participated in the Latvian Women's Chess Championships, in which she has always placed in the top eight after her debut. Her best result in this competition was in 2025, when she became the youngest winner in the history of the Latvian Chess Championships. She repeated this success in 2026.

In 2023, at age 13, Kuznecova became the first FIDE Candidate Master (WCM) in Latvia. A year later, at age 14, she became a FIDE Master (WFM).
