= Voldemārs Mežgailis =

Latvian chess player (1912–1998)

Voldemārs Mežgailis (also Voldemar Mezgailis or Mezhgailis; born 22 April 1912, Viļķene parish, Russian Empire – died 1 June 1998 in Riga) was a Latvian chess master.

In 1934, he took 8th Latvian Chess Championship in Riga (Fricis Apšenieks and Vladimirs Petrovs won). He twice represented Latvia in Chess Olympiads: in the 3rd unofficial Olympiad at Munich 1936 (at sixth board, +4 –5 =1), and in the 7th Olympiad at Stockholm 1937 (at third board, +2 –6 =7).

At the end of World War II, he won the Latvian Chess Championship in June 1944, and won it again in 1950.
