= Vitālijs Samoļins =

Latvian chess International Master (born 1990)

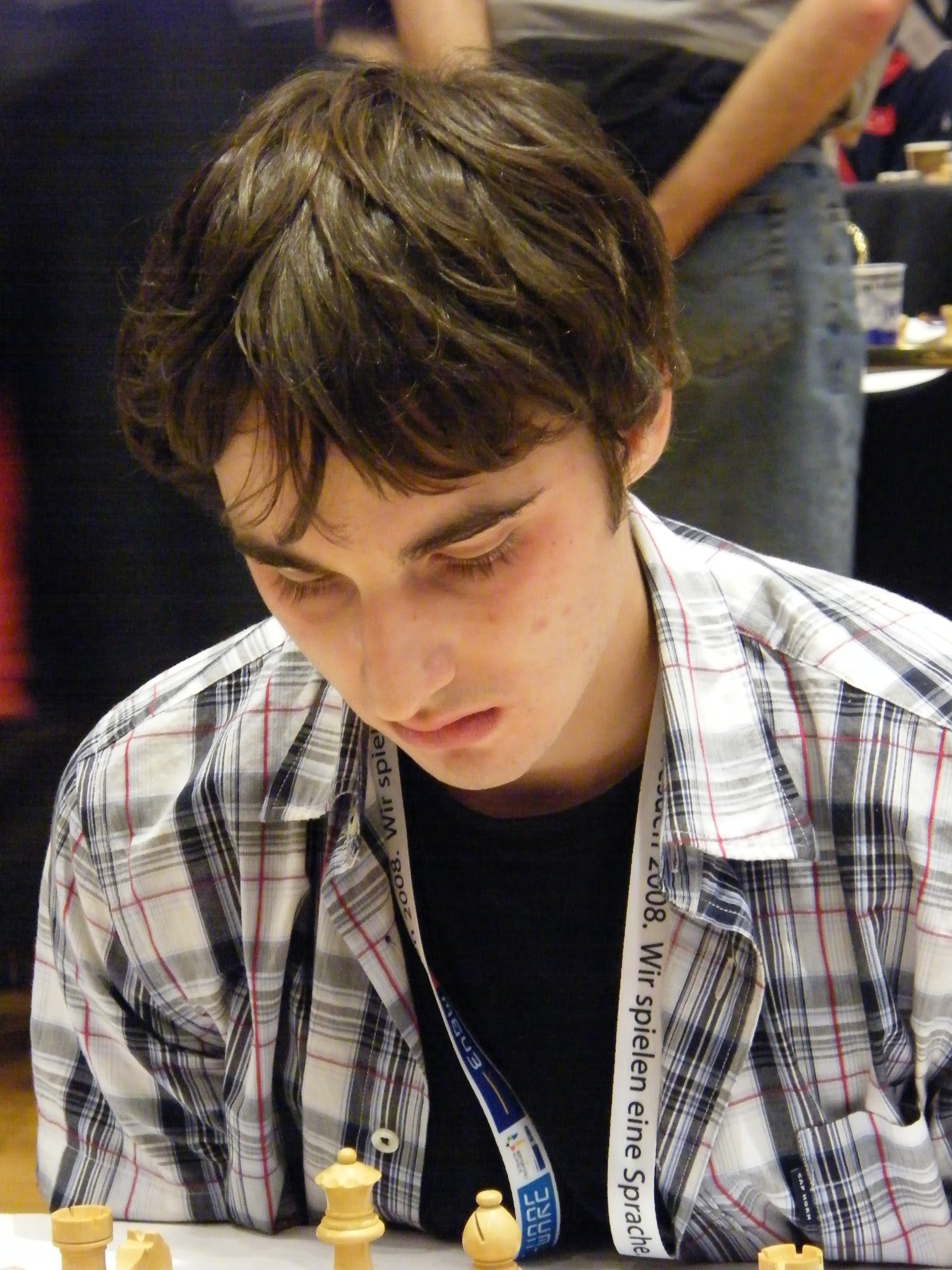
- Samoļins at Chess Olympiad, Dresden 2008

Personal information
- Born: March 7, 1990 (age 36) Jelgava, Latvia

Chess career
- Country: Latvia
- Title: International Master (2009)
- FIDE rating: 2406 (July 2026)
- Peak rating: 2444 (January 2008)

Vitālijs Samoļins (born March 7, 1990, in Jelgava) is a Latvian chess player who holds the FIDE title of International Master (2009). He won the Latvian Chess Championship in 2009 and 2012.

Vitālijs Samoļins played for Latvia in Chess Olympiads:

- In 2006, at second reserve board in the 37th Chess Olympiad in Turin (+3 −3 =0);
- In 2008, at reserve board in the 38th Chess Olympiad in Dresden (+3 −0 =4).
- In 2012, at fourth board in the 40th Chess Olympiad in Istanbul (+2 −4 =1).
