= Alvis Vītoliņš =

Latvian chess player (1946–1997)

Personal information
- Born: 15 June 1946 Sigulda, Latvia
- Died: 16 February 1997 (aged 50) Gauja, Latvia

Chess career
- Country: Latvia
- Title: International Master (1980)
- Peak rating: 2475 (January 1981)

Alvis Vītoliņš (sometimes anglicised as Alvis Vitolins or Vitolinsh; 15 June 1946, in Sigulda – 16 February 1997) was a Latvian chess master.

== Biography ==
Awarded the International Master title in 1980, he was Latvian Champion in 1973 (jointly), 1976, 1977, 1978, 1982, 1983 and 1985 (jointly).

His name is attached to the Vitolins Variation in the Sicilian Defence, Scheveningen Variation (1.e4 c5 2.Nf3 d6 3.d4 cxd4 4.Nxd4 Nf6 5.Nc3 e6 6.Bb5+) and the Vitolins Variation of the Sicilian Defence, Dragon Variation (1. e4 c5 2. Nf3 d6 3. d4 cxd4 4. Nxd4 Nf6 5. Nc3 g6 6.Bg5 Bg7 7. Bb5+).

He died in 1997 at the age of 50. The cause of death was suicide.

== Notable games ==
- Lev Gutman vs Alvis Vitolinsh, USSR 1979, Nimzo-Indian Defense: Reshevsky Variation (E46), 0-1
