= Katrīna Amerika =

Latvian chess player

Personal information
- Born: 31 May 1991 (age 35) Jelgava, Latvia

Chess career
- Country: Latvia
- Title: Woman International Master (2009)
- FIDE rating: 2213 (May 2023)
- Peak rating: 2242 (July 2011)

Katrīna Amerika (née Šķiņķe, born 31 May 1991 in Jelgava) is a Latvian chess player who holds the FIDE title of Woman International Master (2009). She shared third place in the European Girls Under-12 Championship in 2003. She won the Latvian Chess Championship for women in 2014, and finished second in 2011, and 2013, and third on three occasions (2004, 2009, 2010).

Amerika played for Latvia in the Chess Olympiads:

- In 2008, at fourth board in the 38th Chess Olympiad in Dresden (+7 −2 =1);
- In 2010, at fourth board in the 39th Chess Olympiad in Khanty-Mansiysk (+4 -2 =3);
- In 2012, at fourth board in the 40th Chess Olympiad in Istanbul (+5 -3 =1);
- In 2014, at fourth board in the 41st Chess Olympiad in Tromsø (+8 -2 =1).

She played for Latvia in the European Team Chess Championship (women):

- In 2011, at third board in the 18th European Team Chess Championship (women) in Porto Carras (+2 −1 =1);
- In 2015, at fourth board in 20th European Team Chess Championship (women) in Reykjavík (+3 −2 =4).
