= Jānis Kļaviņš =

Latvian chess master

- Country: Latvia
- Born: April 27, 1933; Rīga, Latvia
- Died: November 25, 2008 (aged 75); Latvia
- Title: National master

Jānis Kļaviņš (April 27, 1933 – November 25, 2008) was a Latvian chess master who won the Latvian Chess Championship in 1952.

== Chess career ==
Jānis Kļaviņš had a short but bright chess player career. He won Latvian Championship in 1952 and three times won the bronze medals (1956, 1959, 1960). In 1955 Jānis Kļaviņš fulfilled chess master norm in Team Championship of USSR in Voroshilovgrad. In 1956 Kļaviņš won the All-Union Mass Tournament in Moscow, ahead Isaac Boleslavsky, Vladimir Makogonov, Leonid Stein, Ratmir Kholmov). Kļaviņš played for Latvia in Soviet team chess championship in 1953 (won first prize on third board), 1955, 1958, 1959, 1960 (won third place on third board), 1962, and 1963, and for Latvian team "Daugava" in the Soviet team chess cup in 1954 and 1961. He was well versed in all aspects of chess theory and technique but his strength lied in his ability to make combinations.

== Career in science ==
After completing Faculty of Physics and Mathematics University of Latvia in 1957, Kļaviņš enrolled at the Institute of Physics of Latvian Academy of Sciences (now - Institute of Physics of University of Latvia). He started career in science and ended chess player career. Jānis Kļaviņš has worked as an engineer, scientist, laboratory director, scientific secretary and deputy director of scientific work. He performed research in Magnetohydrodynamics problems and earning his doctorate degree in Physics from there.
