= Astra Klovāne =

Latvian chess player (born 1944)

Personal information
- Born: 13 October 1944 (age 81) Baldone, Latvia

Chess career
- Country: Latvia
- Peak rating: 2265 (January 1997)

Astra Klovāne (née Ērgle, born 13 October 1944 in Baldone) is a former Latvian chess player. Astra Klovāne won the Latvian Chess Championship for women seven times - 1963, 1964, 1965, 1969, 1970, 1977, and 1978. She won also the Latvian women speed championship in 1977, 1978, and 1981.

== Chess career ==
She learned to play chess at the age of 11. Her first teachers were her father and brother, but her first coach was Zigurds Pigits. In 1959, at the age of 15, she won the Latvian Girl Championship, and two years later she won the Baldone Club Championship. In 1961 she shared 1-3 prize in a Moscow tournament. Astra Klovāne won three Latvian Ladies Championships in a row - 1963, 1964, and 1965, without losing a game, and won also the Riga Ladies Championship in 1964. Astra Klovāne played for Latvia in Soviet team competitions:

- In 1962, the best result at ten board in the 8th Soviet Team Chess Championship in Leningrad (+3, =5, -0).
- In 1967, the best result at nine board in the 10th Soviet Team Chess Championship in Moscow (+6, =2, -1).

From time to time, Klovane still participates in chess competition.

== Personal life ==
In 1968 Astra Klovāne graduated from the Latvian University Foreign Language Faculty and worked as a journalist. Astra Klovāne has been active in Latvian Olympic Committee reconstruction, and for several years was President of the Audit Commission. She was married to the nine-time Latvian Champion Jānis Klovāns (1935–2010) and had two daughters.
