= Ilze Bērziņa =

Latvian chess player (born 1984)

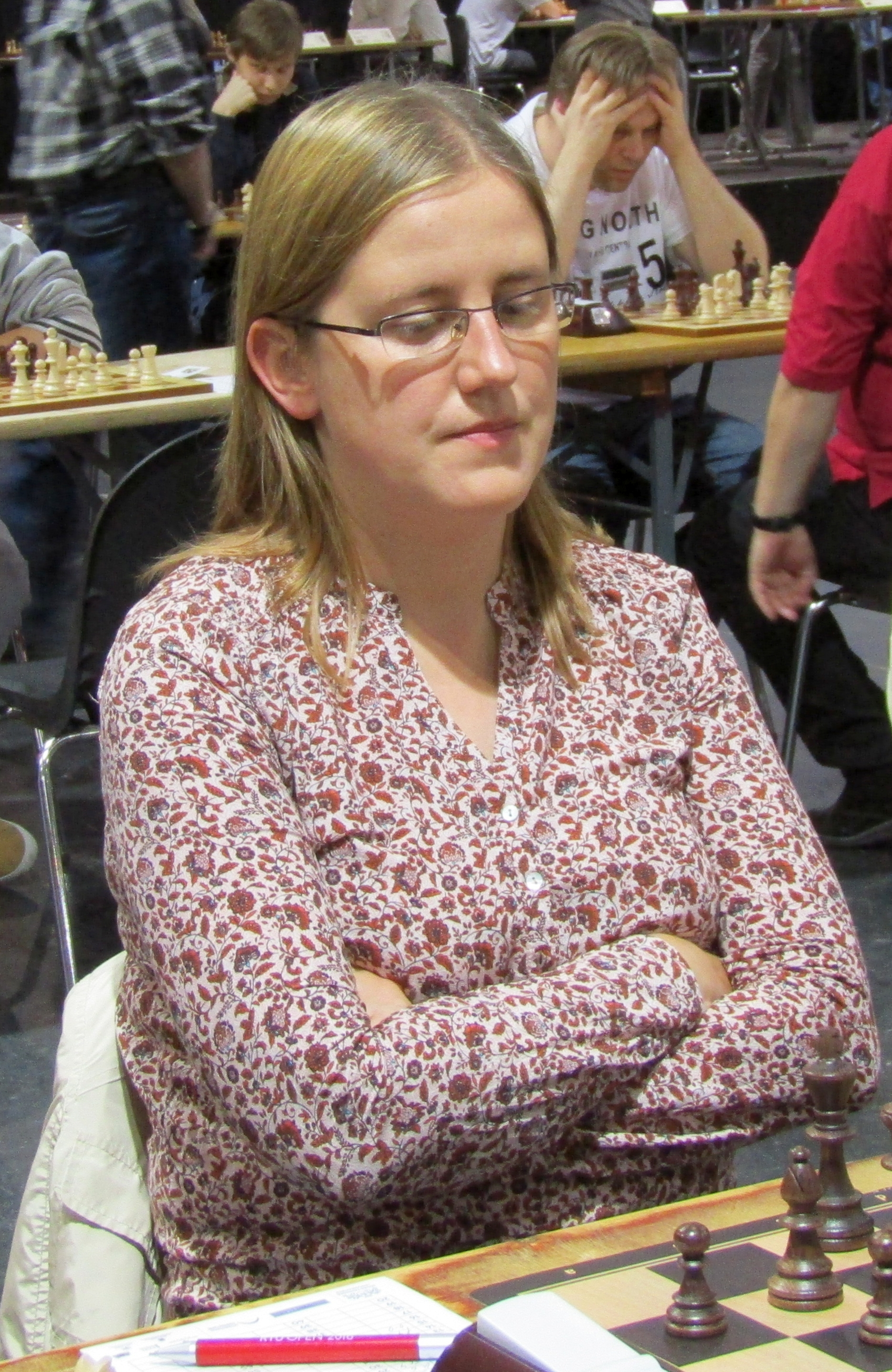
- Bērziņa in 2016

Personal information
- Born: 4 January 1984 (age 42) Rīga, Latvia

Chess career
- Country: Latvia
- Title: Woman Grandmaster (2009)
- Peak rating: 2323 (December 2016)

Ilze Bērziņa (born 4 January 1984 in Rīga) is a Latvian chess player who holds the title of Woman Grandmaster (2009). She won the Latvian Chess Championship for women in 2004, 2008, 2012, 2019 and 2024.

== Chess career ==
Ilze Bērziņa participated in World and European youth tournaments with good results:

- In 1996, fourth place in World Girls Under-12 Championship;
- In 1996, second place in World Girls Under-12 Championship (speed chess);
- In 1998, third place in European Girls Under-14 Championship.

Ilze Bērziņa played for Latvia in Chess Olympiads:

- In 1998, at first reserve board in the 33rd Chess Olympiad in Elista (+4 −3 =1);
- In 2000, at first reserve board in the 34th Chess Olympiad in Istanbul (+5 −2 =3);
- In 2004, at first reserve board in the 36th Chess Olympiad in Calvia (+7 −3 =2);
- In 2006, at first reserve board in the 37th Chess Olympiad in Turin (+5 −2 =3);
- In 2008, at second board in the 38th Chess Olympiad in Dresden (+6 −4 =1);
- In 2010, at third board in the 39th Chess Olympiad in Khanty-Mansiysk (+7 -0 =4). Ilze Bērziņa won the bronze medal at third board;
- In 2012, at third board in the 40th Chess Olympiad in Istanbul (+5 -2 =3);
- In 2014, at third board in the 41st Chess Olympiad in Tromsø (+4 -4 =2);
- In 2016, at third board in the 42nd Chess Olympiad in Baku (+6 -1 =3);
- In 2018, at second board in the 43rd Chess Olympiad in Batumi (+4 -0 =6).

Ilze Bērziņa played for Latvia in European Team Chess Championship (women):

- In 1999, at second board in 3rd European Team Chess Championship (women) in Batumi (+3 −4 =2);
- In 2011, at second board in 18th European Team Chess Championship (women) in Porto Carras (+3 −4 =2);
- In 2015, at third board in 20th European Team Chess Championship (women) in Reykjavík (+2 −2 =5);
- In 2019, at third board in the 22nd European Team Chess Championship (women) in Batumi (+2, =1, -4).

Ilze Bērziņa was Latvian Chess Federation General Secretary.
