= Zigurds Lanka =

Latvian chess grandmaster (born 1960)

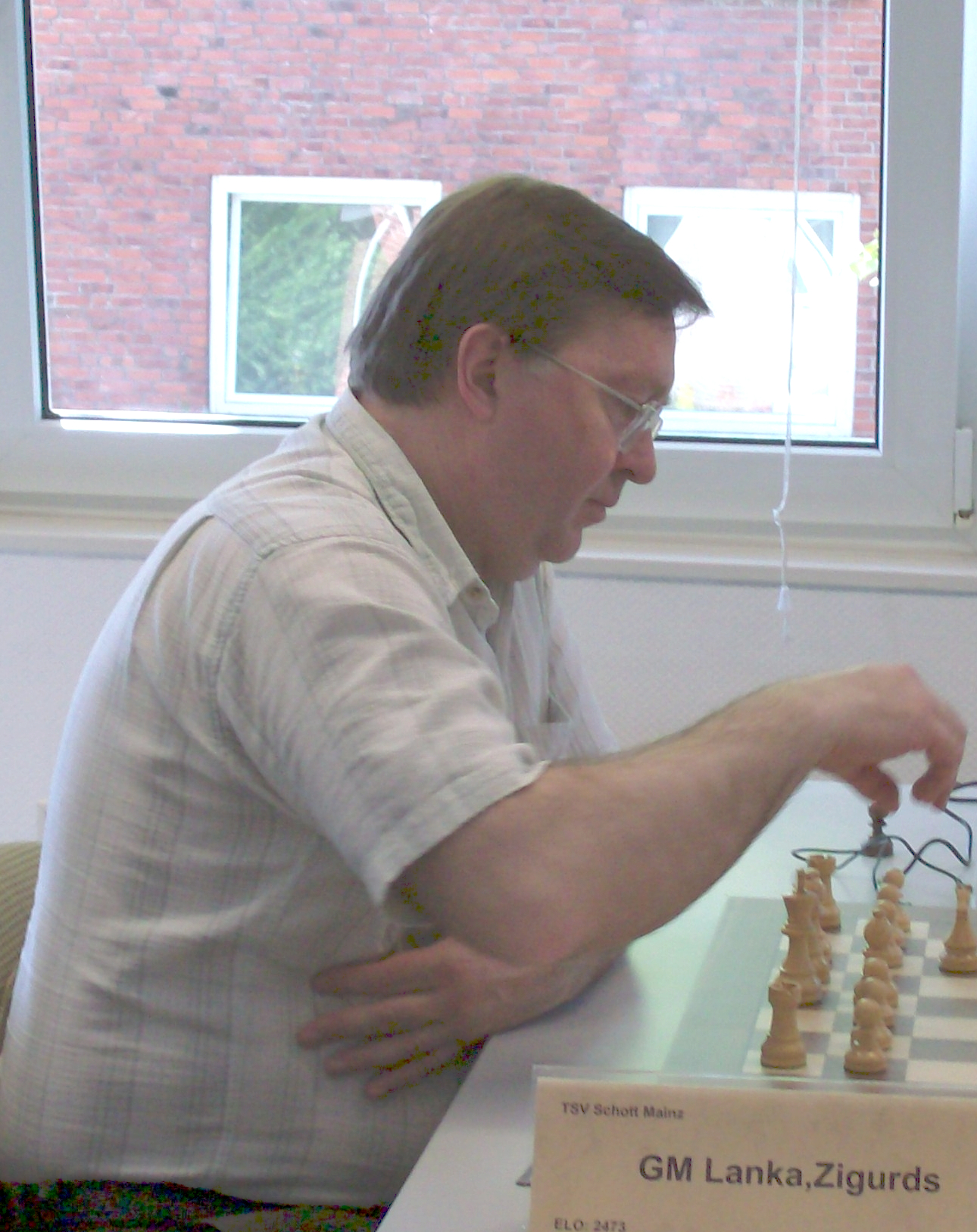

Personal information
- Born: May 21, 1960 (age 66) Baldone, Latvia

Chess career
- Country: Latvia
- Title: Grandmaster (1992), Correspondence Chess International Master (1989)
- FIDE rating: 2384 (December 2021)
- Peak rating: 2575 (January 1997)
- ICCF rating: 2603 (July 1993)
- ICCF peak rating: 2607 (July 1992)

Zigurds Lanka (born May 21, 1960 in Baldone) is a Latvian chess player. In over-the-board chess, he received the FIDE titles of International Master (IM) in 1987 and Grandmaster (GM) in 1992. In correspondence chess, he earned the title of Correspondence Chess International Master (IM) in 1989.

Lanka started to play chess when he was 6 years old. He won the Latvian Chess Championship in 1993 and 2020. His Elo rating peaks were 2575 in 1997 and 2531 in 2005. Lanka is considered to be an excellent theoretician and trainer. He assisted Alexei Shirov. Zigurds Lanka graduated from the Latvian University and is a journalist by profession. In recent years, Lanka has been living in Germany but he still participates in Latvian tournaments on a regular basis.

Lanka is married to former high jumper Nina Serbina.

== Championships ==
Note: (Note: Lanka played for Latvia in all of these Championships)

=== Soviet Team Chess Championship ===
- In 1983, at the third board in the 16th Soviet Team Chess Championship in Moscow (+1, =0, -0).
- In 1979, at the seventh board in the 14th Soviet Team Chess Championship in Moscow (+2, =2, -1);

=== Chess Olympiads ===
- In 1992, at the reserve board in the 30th Chess Olympiad in Manila (+5, =4, -1);
- In 1994, at the third board in the 31st Chess Olympiad in Moscow (+2, =9, -1);
- In 2008, at the fourth board in the 37th Chess Olympiad in Dresden (+2, =2, -4).

=== 3rd World Team Chess Championship ===
- In 1993, at third board in Lucerne (+3, =2, -2).

=== European Team Chess Championship ===
- In 1992, at first board in Debrecen (+2, =4, -2);
- In 1997, at second board in Pula (+2, =4, -3);
- In 1999, at first board in Batumi (+3, =3, -3).
