= Astra Goldmane =

Latvian chess player (born 1956)

Personal information
- Born: Astra Ozola; June 24, 1956 (age 70) Riga, Latvia

Astra Goldmane (née Ozola, born June 24, 1956), also known as Astra Goldman, is a former Latvian chess player.

Goldmane was born in Riga, Latvia. In the 1970s and 1980s she was one of the best women's chess player in Latvia. In 1974, she took 4th place in Championship of USSR juniors in Tallinn. Astra Goldmane won the Latvian Chess Championship for women three times: 1975, 1981, and 1983.

She played for Latvia in Soviet team competitions:

- In 1974, the best result at nine board in the Team Cup of USSR in Moscow (+7, =2, -0).
- In 1975, at eighth board in Spartakiada of USSR in Riga (+1, =2, -5).
- In 1976, at nine board in the Team Cup of USSR in Tbilisi (+2, =3, -2).
- In 1983, at seventh board in Spartakiada of USSR in Moscow (+2, =4, -3).
