= Vija Rožlapa =

Latvian chess player

Personal information
- Born: January 8, 1942 (age 84) Liepāja, Latvia

Chess career
- Country: Latvia
- FIDE rating: 1903 (July 2023)
- Peak rating: 2120 (July 1995)

Vija Rožlapa (born January 8, 1942, in Liepāja) is a Latvian chess player who won the Latvian Chess Championship for women four times.

== Chess career ==
Rožlapa learned to play chess at the age of 12. She won Latvian Girl Championship in 1958 and Soviet Girl Championship in 1960. She fulfilled the chess master norm in 1977.

During the period from 1958 to 1983 Vija Rožlapa participated without interruption in all Latvian women's chess championships. Four times she was won this tournament (1967, 1971, 1972, 1974), five times were won second place (1961, 1965, 1970, 1975, 1979), and was four times won the third place (1963, 1968, 1976, 1980). The last time she took part in Latvian women's chess championship in 2002.

Rožlapa played for Latvia in Soviet team chess championship in 1959, 1960 (won third place at girl board), 1963 (won third place at second women board), 1967, 1969 (won second place at second women board), 1972, and 1975, and for team "Daugava" in Soviet team chess cup in 1961, 1966, 1968, 1974, and 1976.

== Chess teacher and trainer ==
In 1964, Rožlapa decided to become a chess teacher and trainer in Riga Chess school. Among her pupils were Alexei Shirov and Laura Rogule.
