= Fricis Apšenieks =

Latvian chess player (1894–1941)

Fricis Apšenieks (Old orthography: Fritzis Apscheneek; 7 April 1894 in Tetele, Courland Governorate – 25 April 1941 in Riga, Latvian SSR) was a Latvian chess master.

== Biography ==
- In 1924, Apšenieks finished 2nd place, behind Hermanis Matisons at Riga, and he won, ahead of Frédéric Lazard at Paris. He also took 2nd place, behind Hermanis Matisons, and was followed by Edgar Colle, Arpad Vajda, Max Euwe, and Anatol Tschepurnoff, and finished 1st place at the FIDE World Amateur Championship in Paris.
- In 1925, he won ahead of F.H. Terrill at Bromley. He also tied for the 3rd-4th place with Karel Hromadka at Bromley (Premier–A). He also tied for the 3rd-4th place at Debrecen.
- In 1926, he tied for the 3rd-4th place at Abo. He also won at Helsinki. He also took 3rd, behind Vladimirs Petrovs, and Teodors Bergs at Riga. In the same year, Apšenieks won the Latvian Championship at Riga.
- In 1927, he tied for the 5th-7th place at Kecskemét.
- In 1931, he took 6th place at Klaipėda (won by Isakas Vistaneckis).
- In 1932, he tied for the 3rd-5th at the Riga Championship.
- In 1934, he tied for 1st place with Vladimirs Petrovs at Riga.
- In 1937, he tied for the 11th-13th place at Ķemeri.
- In 1939, he tied for the 11th-12th place at Kemeri–Riga (Salo Flohr won).
- In 1941, he took 2nd place, behind Alexander Koblencs at Riga.

Apšenieks played for Latvia at seven official Chess Olympiads: in 1928, 1930, 1931, 1933, 1935, 1937, and 1939. He also played in the unofficial Olympiad at Munich in 1936.

- In July/August 1928, he played at first board at the 2nd Chess Olympiad in The Hague (+8–7=1).
- In July 1930, he played at first board at the 3rd Chess Olympiad in Hamburg (+7–6=4).
- In July 1931, he played at second board at the 4th Chess Olympiad in Prague (+8–3=5).
- In July 1933, he played at first board at the 5th Chess Olympiad in Folkestone (+1–6=7).
- In August 1935, he played at second board at the 6th Chess Olympiad in Warsaw (+6–5=7).
- In August/September 1936, he played at second board at the unofficial Olympiad in Munich (+7–5=6).
- July/August 1937, he played at second board at the 7th Chess Olympiad in Stockholm (+8–4=5).
- In August/September 1939, he played at second board at the 8th Chess Olympiad in Buenos Aires (+5–6=8).

In his final years, he was struggling with health issues. During the first Soviet occupation of Latvia, he died of tuberculosis at the age of 47.

== Notable chess games ==
- Fricis Apšenieks vs Max Euwe (NED), Paris 1924, (ol) f-A, Four Knights, C49, 1-0
- Fricis Apšenieks vs Arthur William Dake (USA), Prague 1931, 4th Olympiad, Caro-Kann, Exchange Variation, B13, 1-0
- Gideon Stahlberg (SWE) vs Fricis Apšenieks, Folkestone 1933, 5th Olympiad, Queen's Gambit Declined, Slav, D11, 0-1
- Frank James Marshall (USA) vs Fricis Apšenieks, Warsaw 1935, 6th Olympiad, Queen's Gambit Accepted, D20, 0-1
- Fricis Apšenieks vs Salo Landau (NED), Kemeri 1937, Slav Defense, D12, 1-0
- Fricis Apšenieks vs Reuben Fine (USA), Stockholm 1937, 7th Olympiad, Four Knights, C49, 1-0
