= Pļaviņas Municipality =

Former municipality of Latvia

Coordinates: 56°36′N 25°43′E

Pļaviņas Municipality Pļaviņu novads
- Municipality
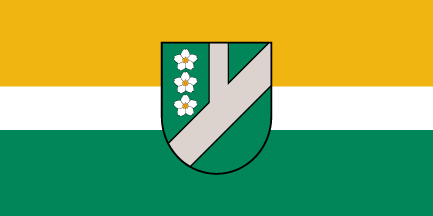
- Flag Coat of arms

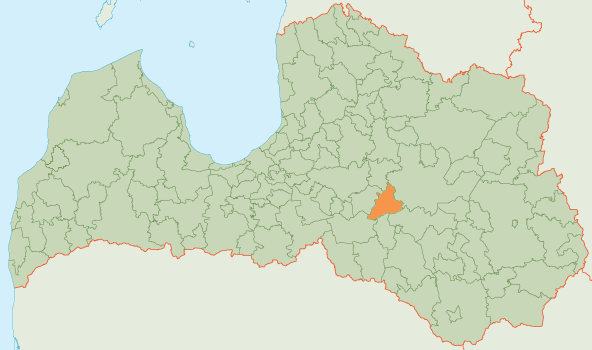
- Country: Latvia
- Formed: 2009
- Centre: Pļaviņas

Government
  - Council Chair: Aigars Lukss (V)

Area
  - Total: 376 km^{2} (145 sq mi)
  - Land: 359.81 km^{2} (138.92 sq mi)
  - Water: 16.19 km^{2} (6.25 sq mi)

Population (2021)
  - Total: 4,765
  - Density: 13.24/km^{2} (34.30/sq mi)
- Website: www.plavinas.lv

Pļaviņas Municipality (Latvian: Pļaviņu novads) is a former municipality in Vidzeme, Latvia. The municipality was formed in 2009 by merging Aiviekste parish, Klintaine parish, Vietalva parish and Pļaviņas town the administrative centre being Pļaviņas. The population in 2020 was 4,808.

On 1 July 2021, Pļaviņas Municipality ceased to exist and its territory was merged into Aizkraukle Municipality.

== See also ==
- Lokstene Shrine of Dievturi
- Administrative divisions of Latvia (2009)
