= Igor Zhdanov =

Latvian chess player (1920–1996)

- Full name: Igor Nikolaevich Zhdanov
- Country: Latvia / Soviet Union
- Born: July 27, 1920; Cesvaine, Latvia
- Died: December 25, 1996 (aged 76); Rīga, Latvia
- Title: National master

Igor Nikolaevich Zhdanov (Russian: Игорь Николаевич Жданов, Latvian: Igors Ždanovs; July 27, 1920, Cesvaine – December 25, 1996, Rīga) is a Latvian/Soviet chess master who won the Latvian Chess Championship in 1943.

== Chess career ==
Igor Zhdanov started to play chess at the age of eight and continued to play chess until his death. He was a master, trainer, organizer and journalist. One of his passion was to give lectures at the Rīga Chess Culture University. Igor Zhdanov attended the Riga State Gymnasium No.1 and upon graduation in 1938 pursued studies in German philosophy at the University of Latvia. At the age of 18, Igor Zhdanov won the Rīga Chess Championship. Thereafter he won many tournaments including the 1943 Latvian Chess Championship. In Soviet Latvia he achieved Candidate Master title in 1948 and Master title in 1964.

Best results in Latvian Championship after Second World War:

- 1948 – 2,
- 1964 – 2.

Igor Zhdanov played for Latvia in Soviet Team Chess Championship in 1953, and for Latvian team "Daugava" in Soviet Team Chess Cup in 1964, 1968, and 1974.

In 1991 in Heilbronn, Germany Igor Zhdanov won the Senior tournament.
