= Elizabete Limanovska =

Latvian chess player (born 2000)

Personal information
- Born: 30 September 2000 (age 25)

Chess career
- Country: Latvia
- Title: Woman FIDE Master (2017)
- FIDE rating: 2176 (September 2020)
- Peak rating: 2232 (February 2019)

Elizabete Limanovska (born 30 September 2000) is a Latvian chess player who holds the title of Woman FIDE Master. She won the Latvian Women Chess Championship in 2018.

== Biography ==
Seven times Elizabete Limanovska won in the Latvian Girl's Chess Championships in different age groups: in 2009 - U10, in 2012 - U12, in 2014 - U14, in 2015 and 2016 - U16, in 2017 and 2018 - U18. She regularly participated of the European Youth Chess Championships (2010 — U10; 2014 — U14; 2016 — U16; 2017 — U18) and World Youth Chess Championships in different age groups (2011, 2012 — U12; 2015, 2016 — U16; 2017 — U18).

In April 2017, in Riga she participated in the Women's European Individual Chess Championship. At the end of July and the beginning of August of the same year, Elizabete Limanovska took part in the International Women chess tournament in Erfurt and fulfilled the FIDE master (WFM) norm. Since 2011, she regularly took part in the Latvian Women's Chess Championships. In May 2018, she won the Latvian Women Chess Championship.

Elizabete Limanovska played for Latvia in Chess Olympiads:

- In 2018, at reserve board in the 43rd Chess Olympiad in Batumi (+5 -1 =2).

Elizabete Limanovska played for Latvia in the European Women's Team Chess Championships:

- In 2019, at fourth board in the 22nd European Team Chess Championship (women) in Batumi (+1, =4, -1).
