= Daniel Fridman =

Latvian-German chess grandmaster (born 1976)

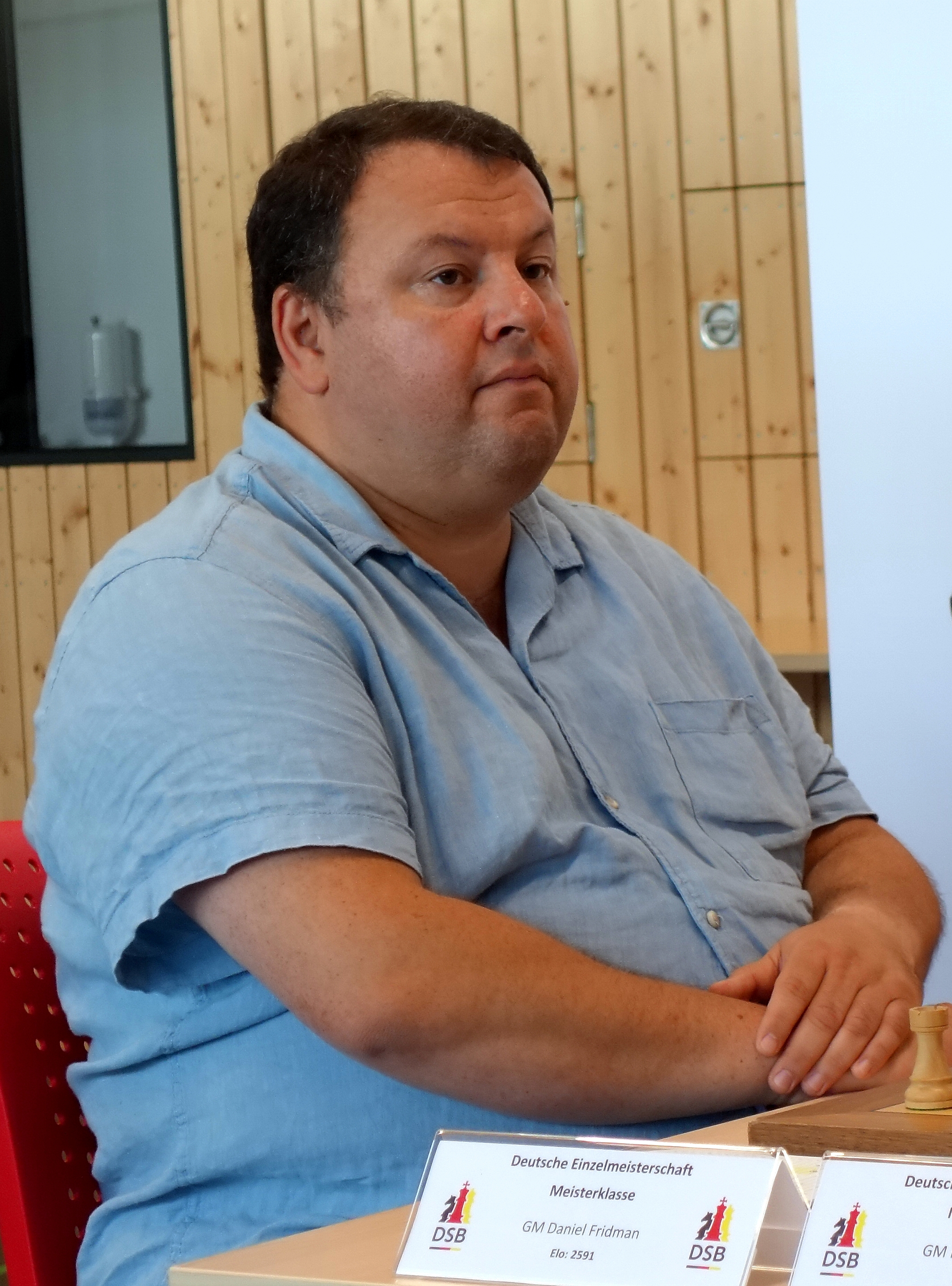
- Daniel Fridman in 2024

Personal information
- Born: Daniels Fridman; February 15, 1976 (age 50) Riga, Latvia
- Spouse: Anna Zatonskih

Chess career
- Country: Latvia (until 2007); Germany (since 2007)
- Title: Grandmaster (2001)
- FIDE rating: 2564 (August 2026)
- Peak rating: 2670 (October 2012)
- Peak ranking: No. 65 (July 2009)

Daniel Fridman (Latvian: Daniels Fridmans; born February 15, 1976) is a Latvian and German chess player. Awarded the title Grandmaster by FIDE in 2001, he was Latvian champion in 1996 and German champion in 2008, 2012 and 2014.

== Early chess career ==
Fridman was born in Riga, Latvia to a Latvian Jewish family. He learned the rules of chess when he was around four years of age. He soon became a regular player of youth tournaments, competing at the national, regional and international levels. His biggest junior success occurred at Duisburg in 1992, when he took home a bronze medal in the Under-16 category of the World Youth Chess Championship.

By the mid-1990s, Fridman was recognised as a serious force in Latvian chess. He went on to win the national championship in 1996, having gained the International Master (IM) title in 1994. Leaving his junior status behind, he had some early international tournament successes at the Wichern Open in Hamburg in 1997 (joint second place, behind Sergei Movsesian) and Senden in 1998 (joint winner with Frank Holzke).

In 1999 he relocated to Germany and qualified as a Grandmaster in 2001.

In 2002, Fridman tied for first place at the U.S. Masters Chess Championship.

== Further success ==
Most of Fridman's major tournament victories have occurred after the year 2000. These include outright or shared first places at Essen ('B' Group) 2001, Recklinghausen Summer Open 2002, Zurich Christmas Open 2002, Southampton, Bermuda 2003 ('B' Group), Stratton Mountain 2004, Marseille Open 2006, Nuremberg 2006, Lausanne 2006, Venaco (Corsica) 2006 and the Liverpool International Open of 2007. In 2019 Fridman won the Grenke Open in Karlsruhe edging out Anton Korobov, Andreas Heimann, Samvel Ter-Sahakyan, Gukesh D, Matthias Blübaum, Alexander Donchenko and Tamás Bánusz on tiebreak score, after all the mentioned players finished with score of 7½/9 points.

He won the German Championship at Bad Wörishofen in 2008, at Osterburg in 2012, and at Verden an der Aller in 2014.

He is a master of speed chess and, among other victories, took first places at the Essen rapid contest of 2000 and Dutch Open rapid tourney of 2008. Playing internet competitions, he has enjoyed success at the Dos Hermanas tournaments of 2004 and 2005. He competed at the 2009 Maccabiah Games in Israel.

== Team events ==
He first represented the Latvian men's team on board 4 at the Yerevan Oympiad of 1996 and at the Pula 1997 European Team Chess Championship. He returned to the Olympiad team as first board in 2004 (Calvià) and in 2006 (Turin). Having become a German citizen, he has since switched chess federations and, as incumbent national champion in 2008, was an automatic choice for the German team at the Dresden Olympiad. In 2018, Fridman won an individual gold medal as the best player on board four at the 43rd Chess Olympiad in Batumi.

Playing league chess in the Bundesliga, he has been a member of the Mulheim Nord club since 2004.

== Personal life ==
Fridman is married to Anna Zatonskih, also a chess player. Having been based mainly in the U.S. since 2006, the couple now plan to reduce their need to travel frequently by spending more time in Germany. They have a daughter, Sofia, and a son, Joshua. Fridman's younger brother Rafael (born 1979) also plays chess and he holds the title of International Master.
