= Ingrīda Priedīte =

Latvian chess player

Personal information
- Born: March 13, 1954 (age 72) Rīga, Latvia

Chess career
- Title: Woman FIDE Master (2014); ICCF Lady Grandmaster (1997)
- FIDE rating: 2022 (April 2020)
- Peak rating: 2240 (January 1990)
- ICCF rating: 2303 (April 2006)
- ICCF peak rating: 2324 (April 2003)

Ingrīda Priedīte (née Bērziņa, born March 13, 1954, in Rīga) is a Latvian female chess player who holds the ICCF title of Lady Grandmaster (LGM, 1997) and the FIDE title of Woman FIDE Master (WFM, 2014). She is a two-time winner of the Latvian Chess Championship for women (1973 and 1979).

Priedīte started to play chess at the age of 9. She won the Latvian Junior championship in 1970, Riga women championship in 1972, Latvian Student championship in 1974 and 1977, and achieved Master title in 1976.

In her later years, Priedīte is also an excellent correspondence chess player. She was second in the 5th Ladies World Championship final (1993–1998).

Priedīte graduated from the Latvian University and is an economist by profession. After Latvian restoration of independence in 1991 she was the first General-Secretary of the Latvian Chess Federation.
