= Alexander Koblencs =

Latvian and Soviet chess player, trainer, and writer

Personal information
- Born: Alexander Naftalevich Koblencs; 3 September 1916 Riga, Governorate of Livonia, Russian Empire
- Died: 9 December 1993 (aged 77) Berlin, Germany

Chess career
- Country: Latvia, Soviet Union
- Title: Master of Sport (1945) Honoured Trainer (1960)

Alexander Koblencs (Latvian: Aleksandrs Koblencs, Russian: Александр Нафтальевич Кобленц, German: Alexander Koblenz; 3 September 1916, Riga – 9 December 1993, Berlin) was a Latvian and Soviet chess master, trainer, and writer. He is best known as the trainer of the 1960–61 World Champion Mikhail Tal.

In 1935, he took 4th place in Rosas (Salo Flohr won). In 1936, he took 5th in Reus (Esteban Canal and Silbermann won). In 1937, he won, ahead of Lajos Steiner, in Brno with 9/11. In 1938, he took 5th in Milan (Erich Eliskases and Mario Monticelli won). In 1939, he tied for 13–14th in Kemeri-Riga (Flohr won).

Koblencs won the Latvian Championship four times (1941, 1945, 1946, 1949). Although he took 2nd, behind Vladimir Alatortsev in 1945, and behind Mark Taimanov in 1949, both were off contest (hors concours). In June 1944, he took 2nd, behind Voldemārs Mežgailis, in Udelnaya (Latvian SSR ch.). In 1944/45, he took 2nd, behind Paul Keres, in Riga (Baltic Chess Championship). In 1945, he took 14th in Moscow (14th USSR-ch). In October/November 1945, he tied for 3rd–4th in Riga (Baltic Republics ch., Vladas Mikėnas won). In June/July 1946, he tied for 6–8th in Vilnius (Baltic Rep. ch, Yuri Averbakh won). In 1961, he took 3rd in Palanga (Baltic Rep. ch, Iivo Nei won).

As a trainer, he started to work with young Mikhail Tal in 1949, and coached him through his meteoric rise from the mid-1950s. Most prominently, he coached him in his World Chess Championship matches in 1960 and 1961 against Mikhail Botvinnik.

He also coached the team of the Soviet Union (e.g., 1956 in Moscow and 1960 in Leipzig).

Koblencs is also well known as a writer of chess books, many of which have been translated, in particular into German. For several years, he was the editor of the Latvian chess magazine Šahs and of the German chess magazine Schach-Journal. Koblencs spent his final years living in Germany.
