= Juzefs Petkēvičs =

Latvian chess grandmaster (1940–2024)

Personal information
- Born: 19 December 1940 Riga, Latvian SSR, USSR
- Died: 1 May 2024 (aged 83) Riga, Latvia

Chess career
- Country: Soviet Union; Latvia
- Title: Grandmaster (2002)
- World Champion: World Senior Champion, 2002
- Peak rating: 2465 (January 1988)

Juzefs Petkēvičs (Polish: Józef Pietkiewicz, Russian: Ю́зеф Изодо́рович Петке́вич; 19 December 1940 – 1 May 2024) was a Latvian chess Grandmaster

== Biography ==
Born into a Polish family (his uncle was a Catholic bishop), he came first in the Riga Championship of 1967, winning all thirteen games. He tied for 1st-3rd at Pärnu 1967. He thrice shared 1st in Latvian Chess Championship (1969, 1974, 1985).

Petkēvičs played for Latvia in Chess Olympiads:

- In 1994, at first reserve board in the 31st Chess Olympiad in Moscow (+1 –1 =4);
- In 1996, at second reserve board in the 32nd Chess Olympiad in Yerevan (+4 –1 =2);
- In 1998, at first reserve board in the 33rd Chess Olympiad in Elista (+2 –0 =3).

At Naumburg in 2002, he won the 12th World Senior Chess Championship.

Petkēvičs was awarded the International Master (IM) title in 1980, and the GM title in 2002.

Petkēvičs died in Riga on 1 May 2024, at the age of 83.
