= Anda Šafranska =

Latvian chess player (born 1960)

Personal information
- Born: December 2, 1960 (age 65) Riga, Latvia
- Spouse: Vladimir Lazarev

Chess career
- Country: Soviet Union → Latvia (before 2000); France (after 2000)
- Title: Woman Grandmaster (1999)
- Peak rating: 2367 (January 2000)

Anda Šafranska (born December 2, 1960, in Riga) is a Latvian-born chess player who holds the title of Woman Grandmaster. For many years, she was one of the highest-rated women's chess players in Latvia. She won the Latvian Chess Championship for women eight times: 1982, 1984, 1990, 1991, 1993, 1994, 1996, and 1997.

Šafranska played for Latvia in Chess Olympiads:

- In 1992, at second board in the 30th Chess Olympiad in Manila (+6, =0, -6);
- In 1994, at first board in the 31st Chess Olympiad in Moscow (+3, =3, -5);
- In 1996, at first board in the 32nd Chess Olympiad in Yerevan (+6, =4, -4);
- In 2006, at third board in the 37th Chess Olympiad in Turin (+1, =1, -4).

She played for Latvia in European Team Chess Championship:

- In 1992, at second board in Debrecen (+2, =2, -3);
- In 1994, at first board in Pula (+3, =1, -3).

Since 2000 Šafranska lives in Léon, France, and she now plays for France.

Šafranska played for France in World Team Chess Championship:

- In 2013, at third board in Astana (+0, =3, -3).

Married with French chess grandmaster Vladimir Lazarev.

== FIDE ratings ==
Elo development
View chart definition.
