= Ilmārs Starostīts =

Latvian chess grandmaster (born 1979)

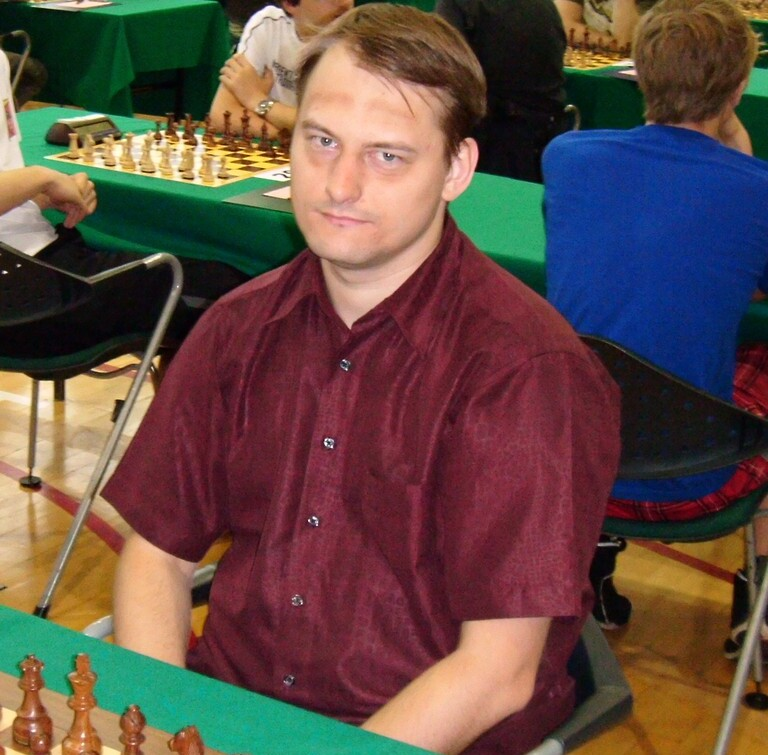
- Starostīts in Warsaw, 2011

Personal information
- Born: May 30, 1979 (age 47) Rēzekne, Latvia

Chess career
- Country: Latvia
- Title: Grandmaster (2010)
- Peak rating: 2512 (October 2007)

Ilmārs Starostīts (born May 30, 1979, in Rēzekne) is a Latvian chess player who holds the FIDE title of Grandmaster (2010).

== Career ==
Ilmārs Starostīts participated in various Junior World Championships from 1993 to 1999. In 2001 he achieved the International Master title. Ilmārs Starostīts twice won the Latvian Chess Championship: 2002 and 2022. He has played in more than 80 important tournaments and won the Stockholm Elo Challenge in 2010, and was second in Rodrigo Memorial (Ferrol, Spain) in 2010.

During the 2007 Vandœuvre Open in late December, Starostīts, falsely accused Anna Rudolf of cheating by hiding a computer in her lip balm. Starostīts in particular asked the arbiter to confiscate her belongings and refused to shake her hand before their game, the latter of which could have been penalized. Marie Boyarchenko, another player at the event, believed these actions were key factors in Rudolf losing that last-round game and cost her the championship. Starostīts has never apologized for his behavior towards Rudolf.

Ilmārs Starostīts played for Latvia in Chess Olympiads:

- In 2002, at second reserve board in the 35th Chess Olympiad in Bled (+5 −3 =4);
- In 2012, at reserve board in the 40th Chess Olympiad in Istanbul (+4 -2 =2);
- In 2024, at reserve board in the 45th Chess Olympiad in Budapest (+5 -0 =3).

Ilmārs Starostīts played for Latvia in European Team Chess Championship:

- In 2011, at fourth board in Porto Carras (+4 −3 =2).
