= Sarma Sedleniece =

Latvian chess player (1939–2020)

Personal information
- Born: 4 November 1939 Rīga, Latvia
- Died: 27 December 2020 (aged 81) Rīga, Latvia

Chess career
- Country: Latvia

Sarma Sedleniece (4 November 1939 - 27 December 2020) was a Latvian chess master who achieve victory in the Latvian Chess Championship for women in 1968.

== Biography ==
Sarma Sedleniece started to play chess at the age of 13 and won the Latvian Girl championship for the first time at the age of 15 and was successful winning the same title three more times (1955–1957). Rīga women chess championship she won also four times: 1959, 1960, 1969 and 1970. She won the Latvian Chess Championship for women in 1968, was the runner-up in 1971 and won the third prize in 1972. In 1971 she played for Latvia team "Daugava" at eighth board in Soviet team chess cup in Rostov-on-Don. Sarma Sedleniece was also a very good correspondence chess player and won the first Latvian correspondence chess championship for women in 1969–1970.

She died on 27 December 2020 and was buried in Jaunciema cemetery in Riga.
