= Ilze Rubene =

Latvian chess player (1958–2002)

Personal information
- Born: July 17, 1958 Riga, Latvia
- Died: August 15, 2002 (aged 44) Riga, Latvia

Chess career
- Country: Latvia
- Title: Woman International Master

Ilze Rubene (July 17, 1958, Riga as Ilze Ramane – August 15, 2002 in Riga in a car accident) was a Latvian chess player who held the title of Woman International Master. She won the Latvian Chess Championship for women in 1976 and 1995. Ilze Rubene played for Latvia in 1992, at first reserve board in the first European Team Chess Championship (women) in Debrecen (+2 −3 =1), and in 1996, at second board in the 32nd Chess Olympiad in Yerevan (+1 −3 =5). She shared victory in the Sweden Ladies International in 1998 and 1999. Rubene is a graduate of the Riga Polytechnical Institute. From 1992 to 2002 she lived in Sweden.
