= Laura Rogule =

Latvian chess player (born 1988)

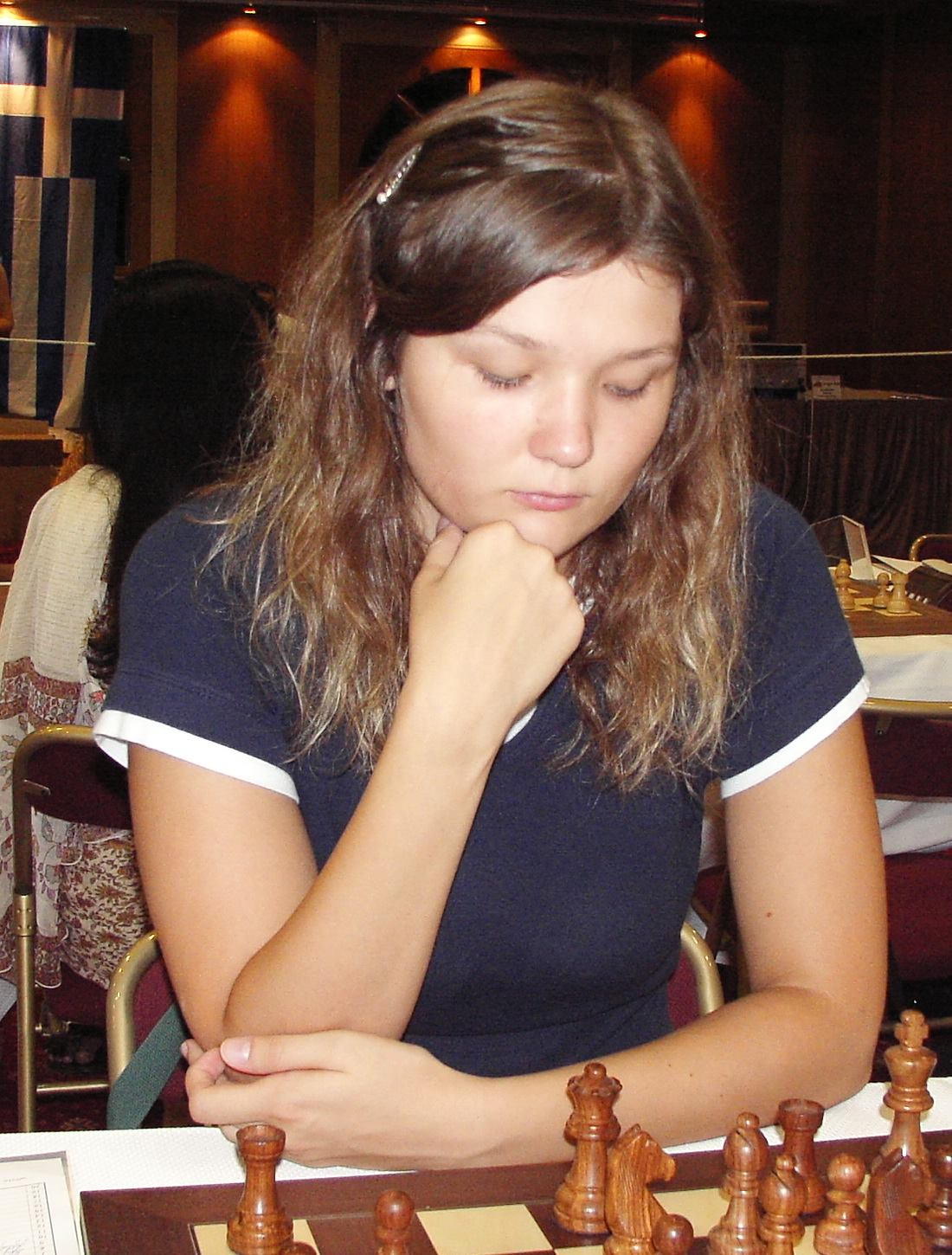

Personal information
- Born: February 5, 1988 (age 38) Riga, Soviet Union

Chess career
- Country: Latvia
- Title: Woman Grandmaster (2005)
- Peak rating: 2362 (November 2010)

Laura Rogule (born 5 February 1988 in Riga) is a Latvian chess player who holds the title of Woman Grandmaster.

== Biography ==
She won the Latvian Chess Championship for women in 2003, 2005, 2006, 2009, 2010, 2011, 2013, 2015, 2016, 2020, 2021, 2022 and 2023. In 2002, she won the World Girls Under-14 Championship. In 2012, she won the European Blitz Chess Championship and European Rapid Chess Championship in Warsaw.

In August 2022, Laura Rogule was the best among women in the "Riga Technical University Open" tournament "A".

Laura Rogule played for Latvia in Chess Olympiads:

- In 2004, at third board in the 36th Chess Olympiad in Calviá (+5, =1, -5);
- In 2006, at second board in the 37th Chess Olympiad in Turin (+7, =2, -3);
- In 2008, at first board in the 38th Chess Olympiad in Dresden (+3, =4, -3);
- In 2010, at second board in the 39th Chess Olympiad in Khanty-Mansiysk (+5, =1, -3);
- In 2012, at second board in the 40th Chess Olympiad in Istanbul (+5 -2 =2);
- In 2014, at second board in the 41st Chess Olympiad in Tromsø (+6 -2 =2);
- In 2016, at second board in the 42nd Chess Olympiad in Baku (+4 -2 =4);
- In 2018, at first board in the 43rd Chess Olympiad in Batumi (+3 -3 =3).

Laura Rogule played for Latvia in 4th European Team Chess Championship (women):

- In 2001, at reserve board in Leon (+3, =2, -1);
- In 2015, at second board in 20th European Team Chess Championship (women) in Reykjavík (+4 −2 =3);
- In 2019, at second board in the 22nd European Team Chess Championship (women) in Batumi (+4, =1, -4).
