= Milda Lauberte =

Latvian chess player (1918–2009)

Milda Lauberte (7 October 1918 in Vildoga – October 19, 2009 in Riga) was a Latvian chess master.

She played in two Women's World Championship tournaments, sharing third place with Sonja Graf, behind Vera Menchik and Clarice Benini at Stockholm 1937, and taking sixth place at Buenos Aires 1939 (V. Menchik won). Milda Lauberte became the first Latvian chess player to participate in the World Chess Championship for Women in Stockholm. In 1940 Lauberte married Lūcijs Endzelīns - chess master and son of the famous Latvian linguist Jānis Endzelīns.
