= Tamāra Vilerte =

Latvian chess player (born 1954)

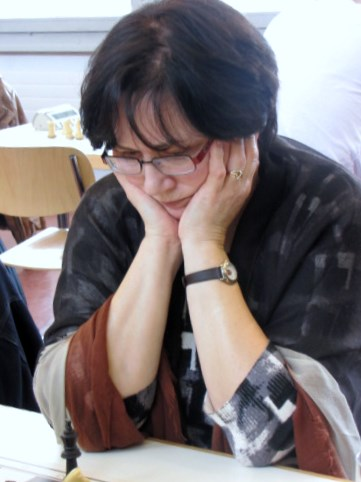
- Vilerte in Bad Ragaz, 2013

Personal information
- Born: 5 March 1954 (age 72) Omsk, Russia

Chess career
- Country: Latvia
- Title: Woman Grandmaster (2008)
- Women's World Champion: Women World Senior Champion, 2008
- Peak rating: 2238 (January 2009)

Tamāra Vilerte (born 5 March 1954 in Omsk), also known as Tamāra Rudovska, is a Latvian chess player who won the World Senior Women Chess Championship in 2008 (Bad Zwischenahn, Germany) and holds the title of Woman Grandmaster. In 2008, she took second place in European Senior Women Chess Championship in Davos. Vilerte won the Latvian Girl Championship in 1971 and 1972. In 1972 she shared third through seventh place at the Soviet Junior Championship. She also shared the Latvian Chess Championship for women in 1973.

Vilerte graduated from the Daugavpils Pedagogical Institute. She is a biology teacher by profession but works as a chess trainer. Her brother Jānis Vilerts (1943–2001) was director at the Kuldiga Chess School.
