= Jānis Klovāns =

Latvian chess grandmaster (1935–2010)

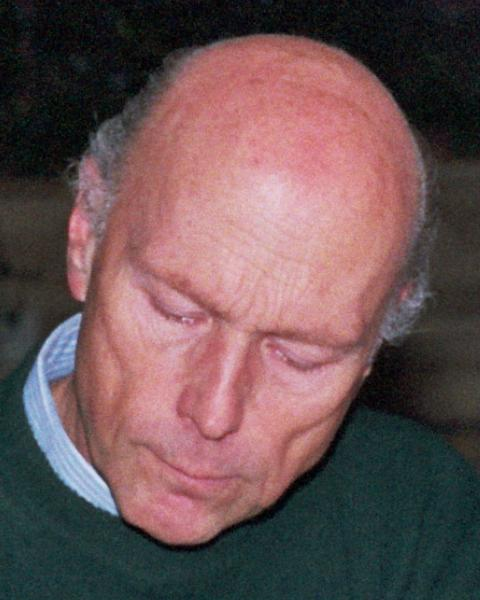
- Klovāns at Bad Liebenzell, 1996

Personal information
- Born: April 9, 1935 Ruba, Latvia
- Died: October 5, 2010 (aged 75) Riga, Latvia

Chess career
- Country: Latvia
- Title: FIDE Grandmaster (1997); ICCF Grandmaster (2001)
- World Champion: World Senior Champion, 1997, 1999, 2001
- Peak rating: 2530 (July 1996)
- ICCF peak rating: 2580 (July 1991)

Jānis Klovāns (April 9, 1935 – October 5, 2010) was a Latvian chess player who held the FIDE title of Grandmaster and the ICCF title of Correspondence Chess Grandmaster. He was a career officer in the Soviet Army.

He won the Latvian Championship nine times (1954, 1962, 1967, 1968, 1970, 1971, 1975, 1979, and 1986), and participated in several Soviet Championships. He was a member of several successful Latvian youth teams during the early to mid-1950s, along with stars such as GM Mikhail Tal and GM Aivars Gipslis.

Klovāns played for Latvia in two Chess Olympiads. In Manila 1992, at second reserve board (+0 −0 =2), and in Istanbul 2000, at third board (+5 −4 =4).

He was awarded the International Master (IM) title in 1976, and the Grandmaster (GM) title in 1997, following his win in the World Senior Championship. This achievement is notable in that he was one of the oldest players to be awarded the GM title for current achievements, rather than an honorary or retrospective title. This can be explained by the fact that although he was a strong master for many years, he was rarely allowed to play outside of the Soviet Union, and therefore had few opportunities to gain FIDE titles. Likely his career as a Soviet Army officer hampered his international chess opportunities. In 2001 he earned the International Correspondence Chess GM title.

Klovāns won the World Senior Chess Championship in 1997, 1999, and 2001. He continued to play into his seventies and maintained a FIDE rating of over 2400, making him one of the strongest players in his age group.

He was married to the six-time Latvian Champion Astra Klovāne and had two daughters.
