= Ingūna Erneste =

Latvian chess player (born 1966)

Personal information
- Born: 23 May 1966 (age 60) Rīga, Latvia

Chess career
- Country: Latvia
- Title: Woman Grandmaster (1992)
- FIDE rating: 2116 (December 2017)
- Peak rating: 2365 (July 1992)

Ingūna Erneste (born 23 May 1966 in Rīga) is a Latvian chess player who holds the FIDE title of Woman Grandmaster (1992).

== Chess career ==
Ingūna Erneste started her chess career in 1978 by winning the Latvian Girls Championship. In 1984 European Junior Chess Championship she placed third. She won the Latvian Chess Championship for women in 1989, and 2002. From 1990 Ingūna Erneste participated in various tournaments with very good results:

- In 1990, fourth place in Women's Soviet Chess Championship;
- In 1991, third place in Women's Soviet Chess Championship;
- In 1993, third place in Dresden tournament for women;
- In 1994, third place in Wisla Open tournament for women;
- In 2002, first place in Ellivouri tournament for women.

Ingūna Erneste played for Latvia in Chess Olympiads:

- In 1992, at first board in the 30th Chess Olympiad in Manila (+5 −4 =3);
- In 1994, at third board in the 31st Chess Olympiad in Moscow (+3 −3 =5);
- In 2004, at second board in the 36th Chess Olympiad in Calvia (+3 −4 =1);
- In 2008, at third board in the 38th Chess Olympiad in Dresden (+3 −2 =2);
- In 2012, at reserve board in the 40th Chess Olympiad in Istanbul (+3 -2 =1);
- In 2014, at reserve board in the 41st Chess Olympiad in Tromsø (+0 -3 =0);
- In 2016, at fourth board in the 42nd Chess Olympiad in Baku (+2 -2 =2).

Ingūna Erneste played for Latvia in European Team Chess Championship (women):

- In 1992, at first board in 1st European Team Chess Championship (women) in Debrecen (+2 −2 =1);
- In 1997, at second board in 2nd European Team Chess Championship (women) in Pula (+1 −3 =0).
- In 2011, at fourth board in 18th European Team Chess Championship (women) in Porto Carras (+0 −2 =5).
