= Aivars Gipslis =

Latvian chess grandmaster (1937–2000)

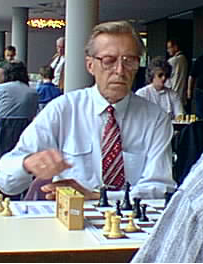
- Gipslis in 1998

Personal information
- Born: 8 February 1937 Riga, Latvia
- Died: 13 April 2000 (aged 63)

Chess career
- Country: Latvia
- Title: FIDE Grandmaster (1967); ICCF Grandmaster (1995)
- Peak rating: 2580 (July 1971)
- ICCF peak rating: 2560 (July 1997)

Aivars Gipslis (8 February 1937 – 13 April 2000) was a Latvian chess player, writer, editor and coach, who held the FIDE title of Grandmaster and the ICCF title of Correspondence Chess Grandmaster.

== Chess biography ==
Born in Riga, he was champion of Latvia in 1955, 1956, 1957, 1960, 1961, 1963, 1964, and 1966. He also played in several Soviet Chess Championships, his best result coming in 1966, when he was equal third with 12/20. Gipslis played in the Sousse Interzonal of 1967, but did not advance to the Candidates' level. Perhaps his best tournament result was the Alekhine Memorial 1967 in Moscow, where he finished on 10/17, a point behind the winner Leonid Stein. His second place was shared with Milko Bobotsov and two World Champions, Vasily Smyslov and Mikhail Tal, ahead of two others, Boris Spassky and Tigran Petrosian, among a host of other strong players. His other outstanding tournament results include equal first at Bad Liebenstein 1963 with Lev Polugaevsky, and equal second at Budapest 1977 behind David Bronstein. Drink affected his performance in later years, but he continued to play right up to the year of his death.

Gipslis became a Grandmaster in 1967. He edited the Latvian chess periodical Šahs from 1963.

=== Team competitions ===
Gipslis played for USSR in the World Student Team Chess Championships of 1957, 1958 and 1959 and in the European Team Chess Championship of 1970. He played for Latvia in the World Team Chess Championship of 1993.

== Openings ==
With the white pieces, he most frequently opened 1.e4. His repertoire as Black was more varied. He is the eponym of the Gipslis Variation of the Sicilian Defence, which he played as Black several times in the 1960s: 1.e4 c5 2.Nf3 e6 3.d4 cxd4 4.Nxd4 a6 5.Bd3 Nf6 6.0-0 d6 7.c4 g6.

== Notable games ==
- Viktor Kupreichik vs Aivars Gipslis, Olympiad URS 1972, Alekhine Defense: Four Pawns Attack, Main Line (B03), 0–1
- Ivica Raicevic vs Aivars Gipslis, Vrnjačka Banja (Yugoslavia) 1975, English Opening: King's English, Four Knights Variation General (A28), 0–1
- Aivars Gipslis vs Artur Sygulski, Jūrmala (Latvia) 1987, Italian Game: Classical Variation, Giuoco Pianissimo (C53), 1–0
- Karoly Honfi vs Aivars Gipslis, Pecs (Hungary) (1964), Nimzo-Indian Defense: Classical. Berlin Variation Pirc Variation (E39) ·
