= 1945 in chess =

The below is a list of events in chess in the year 1945.

== Chess events in brief ==
- After 8 May 1945 – many chess masters from Baltic republics (Romanas Arlauskas, Leonids Dreibergs, Lūcijs Endzelīns, Miervaldis Jurševskis, Leho Laurine, Edmar Mednis, Karlis Ozols, Victor Palciauskas, Ortvin Sarapu, Povilas Tautvaišas, Povilas Vaitonis, Elmārs Zemgalis, etc.) and Ukraine (Fedor Bogatyrchuk, Stepan Popel, Myroslav Turiansky, etc.) fled to the West and most of them had become Displaced Persons in western zones in Germany. At the end of World War II, joining the westward exodus in 1944/45, they escaped to the West, just before the advancing the Soviet forces arrived, to avoid deportation to Siberia and Far East, or any other persecutions the Soviet occupation (e.g., those of Vladimirs Petrovs). Later, almost all of them left Europe for the United States, Canada, Australia, New Zealand.
- 1–4 September 1945 – US vs. USSR radio match. The 10 leading masters of the United States played the 10 leading masters of the Soviet Union (except for Paul Keres) for chess supremacy. The match was played by radio and was a two-game head-to-head match. The USSR team won the match 15½–4½.
- In 1945, Alan Turing (1912–1954), an English mathematician, logician, cryptographer, and computer pioneer, used chess-playing as an example of what a computer could do.

== Tournaments ==
- Mar del Plata (the 8th it), won by Miguel Najdorf followed by Hermann Pilnik, Gideon Ståhlberg, Paul Michel, etc.
- Quilmes won by Ståhlberg ahead of Heinrich Reinhardt, Karel Skalička, René Letelier and Moshe Czerniak.
- Viña del Mar won by Carlos Guimard ahead of Najdorf and Mariano Castillo.
- Buenos Aires (Grau Memorial), won by Najdorf followed by Ståhlberg, Guimard, Michel and Julio Bolbochán, etc.
- Rio de Janeiro won by Erich Eliskases and João de Souza Mendes.
- Sydney (the Australian Chess Championship), won by Lajos Steiner.
- Madrid won by Alexander Alekhine, March 1945.
- Visby (the Swedish Chess Championship), won by Erik Lundin.
- Tallinn (the Estonian Chess Championship), won by Paul Keres ahead of Alexander Kotov.
- Riga (the Latvian Chess Championship), won by Vladimir Alatortsev ahead of Alexander Koblencs.
- Moscow (Championship of the City), won by Vasily Smyslov ahead of Viacheslav Ragozin.
- Moscow (the 14th USSR Chess Championship), won by Mikhail Botvinnik ahead of Isaac Boleslavsky and David Bronstein, June–July 1945.
- Kaunas (the Lithuanian Chess Championship), won by Vladas Mikėnas ahead of Alexander Tolush, 16–31 July 1945.
- Peoria, Illinois (the 46th U.S. Open), won by Anthony Santasiere, July 1945.
- Gijón won by Antonio Rico ahead of Alekhine and Antonio Medina, July 1945.
- Hollywood (the 1st Pan American Chess Championship), won by Samuel Reshevsky followed by Reuben Fine, Pilnik, Israel Albert Horowitz, Isaac Kashdan, Héctor Rossetto, etc., 28 July – 12 August 1945.
- Sabadell won by Alekhine, August 1945.
- Almería won by Alekhine and F. López Núñez, August 1945.
- Melilla won by Alekhine, September 1945.
- Cáceres won by Francisco Lupi ahead of Alekhine, Autumn 1945.
- Riga (the Baltic Chess Championship), won by Mikenas ahead of Tolush, Koblencs and Isakas Vistaneckis, 26 October – 20 November 1945.
- Kecskemét won by Gedeon Barcza ahead of László Szabó.
- Zlín won by Petar Trifunović ahead of Luděk Pachman.
- Ljubljana won by Svetozar Gligorić ahead of Milan Vidmar and Milan Vidmar Jr., December 1945 – January 1946.
- Hastings won by Savielly Tartakower followed by Folke Ekström, Max Euwe, Herman Steiner and Arnold Denker, December 1945 – January 1946.

== Team matches ==
- 17–18 July, Sofia: Sofia vs. Belgrade 7-9
- 1–4 September, radio match: Soviet Union vs. United States 15½-4½ (8-2, 7½-2½)

(Botvinnik 11 Denker; Smyslov 11 Reshevsky; Boleslavsky ½1 Fine; Flohr 10 Horowitz; Kotov 11 Kashdan; Bondarevsky 0½ H.Steiner; Lilienthal ½½ Pinkus; Ragozin 11 Seidman; Makogonov 1½ Kupchik; Bronstein 11 Santasiere)

== Births ==
- 6 February – Mišo Cebalo, Yugoslav/Croatian GM
- 9 February – Nino Kirov, Bulgarian GM
- 18 February – Ján Plachetka, Slovak GM
- 14 March – David Levy in London, Scottish IM involved in computer chess
- 31 March – Jorge Rubinetti, Argentine IM and four time Argentine Champion
- 25 July – Slobodan Martinović, Yugoslav/Serbian GM
- 21 August – Lev Alburt in Orenburg, Russian/American GM, US Champion in 1984 and 1985
- 26 September – Lev Gutman in Riga, Latvian-German-Israeli GM
- 10 October – Yuri Razuvayev, Soviet GM
- 14 October – Boris Baczynsky in Vienna, Ukrainian/American FM
- 6 December – Dan Harrington in Cambridge, Massachusetts, American chess and professional poker player
- 21 December – Duncan Suttles in San Francisco, Canadian GM
- Frederic Friedel, co-founder of the computer chess database company ChessBase and chess journalist
- Miyoko Watai, Japanese Women's champion, companion to Bobby Fischer

== Deaths ==
- 1945 – Arthur Wijnans, Dutch master, possibly killed in an Allied bombardment in Germany.
- January 1945 – Wolfgang Weil, Austrian master, died in combat in Croatia.
- 14 January 1945 – Arnold van den Hoek, Dutch master, killed in an Allied bombardment in a labor camp at Watenstedt, suburb of Brunswick, Germany.
- 15 January 1945 – Kornél Havasi died in Budapest, Hungary.
- 1 April 1945 – Zoltán von Balla died in a traffic accident with a Soviet tank in Budapest, Hungary.
- 17 April 1945 – Klaus Junge, a lieutenant of the 12th SS Battalion, refusing to surrender, died in combat against Allied troops in the battle of Welle on the Lüneburger Heide, close to Hamburg.
- ca. May 1945 – Heinz Nowarra possibly killed in an Allied bombardment in Berlin, Germany.
- 25 June 1945 – Lazar Zalkind, Ukrainian chess problemist, died of a heart attack in Komsomolsk-on-Amur, Khabarovsk Krai, located in the Russian Far East.
- 14 October 1945 – Győző Exner, Hungarian master, died in Hungary.
- 20 October 1945 – Julius Dimer, German master, died in Germany.
