= Leho Laurine =

Estonian chess player (1904–1998)

Leho Laurine (Leo Laurentius) (28 August 1904 in St. Petersburg – 31 January 1998 in Stockholm) was an Estonian chess master.

He was Estonian Champion in 1932 (4th EST-ch), and took 3rd in 1935, behind Paul Keres, and Gunnar Friedemann (7th EST-ch).

Throughout the 1930s, he played in the Estonian Club championships. In 1930 he won team silver medal, with Nedsvedski, Vidrik Rootare and Karring. In 1931 and 1938, he won two team gold medals, firstly with Villard, Karring, and Vladimirs Petrovs, and then with Paul Felix Schmidt, Johannes Türn, Kalde, and Laht.

He played for Estonia in two Chess Olympiads.

- In 1935, at third board in 6th Chess Olympiad in Warsaw (+4 -8 =2);
- In 1936, at fifth board in 3rd unofficial Chess Olympiad in Munich (+5 -7 =3).

During World War II, he played the Estonian championships of 1942 and 1943 (both won by Keres). In 1944, Laurine, along with many other Baltic players (Romanas Arlauskas. Leonids Dreibergs, Lucius Endzelins, Miervaldis Jurševskis, Edmar Mednis, Karlis Ozols, Ortvin Sarapu, Povilas Tautvaišas, Povilas Vaitonis, Elmārs Zemgalis, etc.) escaped to the West, just before the advancing Soviet forces arrived, to avoid deportation to Siberia or any other persecutions resulting from a Soviet occupation, an example being the case of Vladimirs Petrovs. Laurine left Tallinn for Germany and then Sweden.

In 1963, he tied for 3rd-4th in Stockholm (Vasily Smyslov won).
