= Leonids Dreibergs =

Latvian-American chess player (1908–1969)

Leonīds Dreibergs (also Leonid Dreiberg, 27 October 1908, Riga – 6 April 1969, Saginaw, Michigan) was a Latvian–American chess master.

Dreibergs took sixth place at Riga 1930 (Vladimirs Petrovs won), took ninth at Ķemeri 1939 (Salo Flohr won), and took fifth at Riga 1941 (Alexander Koblencs won).

At the end of World War II, joining the westward exodus in 1944/45, he — along with many other Baltic players, e.g. Romanas Arlauskas, Lūcijs Endzelīns, Miervaldis Jurševskis, Leho Laurine, Edmārs Mednis, Kārlis Ozols, Ortvin Sarapu, Povilas Tautvaišas, Povilas Vaitonis, Elmārs Zemgalis, etc., and Ukrainian players, e.g. Fedor Bohatyrchuk, Stepan Popel, Myroslav Turiansky, etc. — moved to the West.

After the war, while living as a D.P. (Displaced Person) in post-war Germany, Dreibergs tied for 12-13th at Augsburg 1946 (Wolfgang Unzicker won), and shared first with Zemgalis at Esslingen 1949. Afterwards he emigrated to the United States. Dreibergs won the Michigan Championship twice (1954 and 1955). He also played in the Correspondence Chess League of America (CCLA).
