= Romanas Arlauskas =

Lithuanian-born Australian chess player

Personal information
- Born: 11 June 1917 Kovno, Kovno Governorate, Russian Empire
- Died: 22 September 2009 (aged 92) Adelaide, Australia

Chess career
- Country: Lithuania; Australia
- Title: ICCF Grandmaster (1965)
- ICCF rating: 2485 (July 1993)

Romanas Arlauskas (11 June 1917 – 22 September 2009) was an Australian chess player of Lithuanian origin who held the ICCF title of Correspondence Chess Grandmaster.

Arlauskas played at sixth board (+4 –7 =7) in an unofficial Chess Olympiad at Munich 1936. He tied for 1st–3rd, with Mečislovas Birmanas and Leonardas Abramavičius, ahead of Povilas Vaitonis, Povilas Tautvaišas, etc., at the 1943 Lithuanian Chess Championship in Vilnius.

At the end of World War II, Arlauskas, along with many other Baltic players (Leonids Dreibergs, Lucius Endzelins, Miervaldis Jurševskis, Leho Laurine, Edmar Mednis, Karlis Ozols, Ortvin Sarapu, Povilas Tautvaišas, Povilas Vaitonis, Elmārs Zemgalis, etc.) escaped to western Europe, just before the advancing Soviet forces arrived, to avoid deportation to Siberia or any other persecutions by the Soviet occupation (e.g., those of Vladimirs Petrovs). In 1946, Arlauskas placed third, with 10/13, in a round-robin event at Meerbeck. In 1947, Arlauskas tied for 6–7th in Kirchheim. He, like Endzelins, Ozols and Sarapu, migrated from Germany to Australia. Arlauskas won the South Australian championship in 1949.

He finished 3rd in the 4th World Correspondence Chess Championship (1962–1965) and was awarded the GMC title in 1965.
