= 1962 in chess =

Events in chess in 1962:

== Events ==
- March 8 – 5th Interzonal Tournament at Stockholm won by Bobby Fischer (USA) with 17.5/22. Tigran Petrosian (USSR) and Efim Geller (USSR) tied for 2nd–3rd with 15 points, Victor Korchnoi (USSR) and Miroslav Filip (Czechoslovakia) tied for 4th–5th with 14 points. Pal Benko (USA) won the sixth and final qualifying position for the Candidates Tournament in a three-way playoff with Leonid Stein (USSR) and Svetozar Gligorić after all tied for 6th–8th with 13.5 points. Although Stein scored the most points in the playoff, he was barred from qualifying for the Candidates Tournament by a FIDE rule that allowed no more than three players from the same federation to qualify. The Interzonal was originally scheduled to be played in the Netherlands in 1961, but difficulties obtaining visas caused a delay while another site was found.
- 5th Candidates Tournament in Curaçao won by Tigran Petrosian (USSR) with 17.5/27, a half point ahead of Paul Keres (USSR) and Efim Geller (USSR) tied for 2nd–3rd. Bobby Fischer (USA) finishes fourth. The victory makes Petrosian the challenger in the 1963 World Championship against Mikhail Botvinnik (USSR).
- 20 April – 20 May – The inaugural Capablanca Memorial chess tournament is held in Havana. Miguel Najdorf is first in a field of 22 players, followed by Lev Polugaevsky and Boris Spassky, Svetozar Gligorić and Vasily Smyslov, Borislav Ivkov, etc.
- 15 September – 10 October 10 – Thirty-seven teams compete at the 15th Chess Olympiad in Varna. The Soviet team featuring six grandmasters and led by World Champion Mikhail Botvinnik (Botvinnik, Tigran Petrosian, Boris Spassky, Paul Keres, Efim Geller, and Mikhail Tal) wins gold. Yugoslavia and Argentina take silver and bronze, respectively. The Olympiad featured the famous game between World Champion Botvinnik and 19-year-old American Bobby Fischer. Playing the black side of a Grünfeld Defence, Fischer obtained a small advantage but was not able to convert the endgame into a victory. The endgame has been subjected to extensive analysis, starting during the adjournment when the Soviet team analyzed through the night in a successful attempt to save the game while Fischer looked for a win. In the decades following there has been much investigation of whether Fischer's advantage was ever large enough to force a win as Fischer claimed in My 60 Memorable Games.
- The 1962 Women's World Chess Championship is held in Moscow. Twenty-year-old Nona Gaprindashvili (Soviet Union) goes undefeated in the match, beating incumbent champion Elisabeth Bykova (Soviet Union) by the score 9–2 to become the fifth and youngest Women's World Champion.
- The first South African Open chess tournament is held in Wilderness, Western Cape, and won by Harry Golombek and Alberic O'Kelly.
- One of the earliest junior international tournaments held at Groningen under the sponsorship of tobacco firm T. Niemeyer. The event was later informally recognized as the European Junior Championship and later still, adopted by FIDE as the official contest. The boys U-20 event was won by Coenraad Zuidema (Netherlands).
- Robert Abbot invents the chess variant Baroque Chess.
- Martin Gardner invents hexapawn, a small two-player game.

== Births ==
- Martin Kreuzer, German ICCGM, FM, and mathematics professor.
- February 12 – Nana Ioseliani, Georgian IM and WGM, two time challenger for the Women's World Championship.
- February 19 – Rogelio Antonio Jr., Filipino GM.
- April 5 – Kirsan Ilyumzhinov, Kalmyk President of FIDE since 1995.
- April 10 – Alexander Huzman, Ukrainian born Israeli GM and trainer.
- April 18 – William Watson, British GM and lawyer.
- June 13 – Paul Motwani, Scottish GM.
- July 31 – Agnieszka Brustman, Polish WGM.
- August 17 – Michael Wilder, American GM and attorney.
- August 25 – Alexander Graf, Uzbek-German GM.
- September 17 – Xu Jun, Chinese GM.
- October – Deen Hergott, Canadian IM, mathematician, and chess writer.
- October 14 – Jaan Ehlvest, Estonian/American GM.

== Deaths ==
- February 25 – Toma Popa (1908–1962), Romanian Chess Champion in 1948
- March 11 – Viacheslav Ragozin (1908–1962), 53, Soviet GM, International Arbiter, chess writer, and World Correspondence Chess Champion 1956–59.
- April 3 – Ernst Grünfeld (1893–1962), 68, Austrian GM and opening theorist, eponym of the Grünfeld Defence.
- April 23 – Oskar Antze (1878–1962), German chess player.
- April 25 – Leo Zobel (1895–1962), Czechoslovak Chess Champion in 1931
- May 4 – Josef Rejfiř (1909–1962), 52, Czechoslovak IM.
- July 27 – Roy Turnbull Black (1888–1962), American chess player and judge who defeated Capablanca in 1911.
- August 16 – Axel Cruusberg (1901–1962), Danish Olympian
- October 9 – Milan Vidmar (1885–1962), 77, Yugoslav/Slovene GM.
- October 17 – Edward Hymes (1908–1962), American chess player
- October 25 – Abe Turner (1924–1962), 38, American chess expert, murdered at the offices of Chess Review.
- November 30 – Ossip Bernstein (1882–1962), 80, Russian born French GM and a financial lawyer.
- December – Menachem Oren (1901–1962), Polish-born Israeli chess player and mathematician.
- November 18 – Abram Gurvich (1896–1962), Soviet chess problem composer
- December 27 – Pál Réthy (1905–1962), Hungarian chess Olympian in 1935
