= 1st unofficial Chess Olympiad =

International chess tournament

The 1st Team Chess Tournament was held together with the 1924 Summer Olympics in Paris, 12–20 July 1924, at the Hotel Majestic. Fifty-four players representing 18 countries were split into nine preliminary groups of six. The winner of each round qualified for the Championship while the rest joined an eight-round Swiss consolation tournament. The event was organized by the French Chess Federation (FFE) after they unsuccessfully campaigned to include chess as an Olympic sport in the 1924 Summer Olympics.

Edith Holloway played on the British team, making her the first woman to play in an unofficial chess Olympiad, 26 years before the first woman played in an official chess Olympiad.

== Results ==
The final results were as follows:

=== Amateur World Championship ===
#	Player	Points	Buch
1	Hermanis Matisons (LAT)	5.5	
2	Fricis Apšenieks (LAT)	5.0	
3	Edgard Colle (BEL)	4.5	
4	Árpád Vajda (HUN)	4	16.75
5	Machgielis Euwe (NED)	4	15.75
6	Anatol Tschepurnoff (FIN)	4	14.75
7	Luis Argentino Palau (ARG)	3.5	
8	Manuel Golmayo de la Torriente (ESP)	3	
9	Kornél Havasi (HUN)	2.5	

=== Consolation Cup ===
#	Player	Σ Points	Qual.	Final
1	Karel Hromádka (TCH)	9.5	3	6.5
2	Jan Schulz (TCH)	9	4	5
3	Erwin Voellmy (SUI)	8.5	3.5	5
4	Kārlis Bētiņš (LAT)	8	2	6
	Georges Renaud (FRA)	8	3	5
	Roberto Grau (ARG)	8	3.5	4.5
	George Koltanowski (BEL)	8	3.5	4.5
8	Giovanni Cenni (ITA)	7.5	1.5	6
	Endre Steiner (HUN)	7.5	2	5.5
	Otto Zimmermann (SUI)	7.5	2.5	5
	Dawid Daniuszewski (POL)	7.5	2.5	5
	Károly Sterk (HUN)	7.5	3	4.5
	Damián Reca (ARG)	7.5	3.5	4
14–45	etc.			

=== Individual medals ===
#	Player	Achievement
1	Hermanis Matisons (LAT)	Championship Final Winner
2	Fricis Apšenieks (LAT)	Championship Final 2nd place
	Edgard Colle (BEL)	Championship Final 3rd place
3	Árpád Vajda (HUN)	Championship Final Participant
	Machgielis Euwe (NED)	Championship Final Participant
	Anatol Tschepurnoff (FIN)	Championship Final Participant
	Luis Argentino Palau (ARG)	Championship Final Participant
	Manuel Golmayo de la Torriente (ESP)	Championship Final Participant
	Kornél Havasi (HUN)	Championship Final Participant
	Karel Hromádka (TCH)	Consolation Cup Winner

=== Team classification ===
#	Team	Points	Players
1	Czechoslovakia	31	Hromádka 9½, Schulz 9, Vaněk 6½, Skalička 6
2	Hungary	30	Vajda 8, Sterk 7½, Steiner E. 7½, Havasi 7
3	Switzerland	29	Voellmy 8½, Zimmermann 7½, Johner H. 6½, Naegeli 6½
4	Latvia	27.5	Apšenieks 10, Matisons 9½, Bētiņš 8
	Argentina	27.5	Grau 8, Reca 7½, Palau 7, Fernández Coria 5
6	Italy	26.5	Cenni 7½, Rosselli del Turco 7, Romih 6½, Miliani 5½
7	France	25.5	Renaud 8, Lazard F. 6½, Duchamp 6, Gibaud 5
	Poland	25.5	Daniuszewski 7½, Piltz 6, Kohn 6, Kleczyński 6
9	Belgium	24	Colle 8½, Koltanowski 8, Lancel 5, Jonet 2½
10	Spain	19	Golmayo Torriente 7, Marin y Llovet 6, Rey Ardid 6
11	Netherlands	18.5	Euwe 8, Oskam 6, Rueb 4½
12	Romania	18	Davidescu 7, Gudju 6, Loewenton 5
13	Finland	15	Tschepurnoff 9, Malmberg 6
14	Great Britain	12.5	Handasyde 6, Wreford-Brown 3½ Holloway 3
15	Irish Free State	5.5	O'Hanlon 5½
16	Canada	5	Smith 5
17	Russia (Note: Potemkine and Kahn were White émigrés living in Paris and represented "Russia", not the Soviet Union.)	4.5	Potemkine 3, Kahn 1½
18	Kingdom of Serbs, Croats and Slovenes	2.5	Rozić 2½

== FIDE ==
On 20 July, the last day of the games, 15 delegates from all over the World signed the proclamation act of the International Chess Federation (originally known as Fédération Internationale des Échecs in French) and elected Alexander Rueb of the Netherlands the first FIDE president.

Latin motto Gens una sumus ("we are one family") became official and well-recognized watchword of the chess unity. Below is the historic list of 15 founders of FIDE: Abonyi (Hungary), Grau (Argentina), Gudju (Romania), Marusi (Italy), Nicolet (Switzerland), Ovadija (Yugoslavia), Penalver y Zamora (Spain), Rawlins (Great Britain), Rueb (Netherlands), Skalička (Czechoslovakia), Smith (Canada), Towbin (Poland), Tschepurnoff (Finland), Vincent (France), Weltjens (Belgium).
