= Kemeri 1937 chess tournament =

Chess tournament

Kemeri 1937 was a chess tournament held in the resort town Ķemeri, Latvia, at the Gulf of Riga from 16 June to 8 July 1937. There were three co-winners: Samuel Reshevsky, Salo Flohr and Vladimir Petrov. Petrovs was one of the world's leading chess players in the late 1930s (e.g., the 8th Chess Olympiad at Buenos Aires 1939), but due to the political tragedies that befell the Baltic states in World War II, he became a victim of the Soviet oppression and perished in Kotlas (Russia) gulag in 1943.

The final standings and crosstable:

Kemeri 1937
#	Player	01	02	03	04	05	06	07	08	09	10	11	12	13	14	15	16	17	18	Total	Place
01	Samuel Reshevsky (United States)	x	1	½	0	1	1	½	1	½	1	0	0	1	½	1	1	1	1	12	1–3
02	Vladimirs Petrovs (Latvia)	0	x	½	½	½	½	½	1	1	0	1	1	1	1	1	1	1	½	12	1–3
03	Salo Flohr (Czechoslovakia)	½	½	x	½	½	½	½	½	½	½	1	1	½	1	1	1	1	1	12	1–3
04	Alexander Alekhine (France)	1	½	½	x	½	1	½	1	½	0	½	½	½	½	1	1	1	1	11½	4–5
05	Paul Keres (Estonia)	0	½	½	½	x	1	½	½	0	1	1	1	½	1	½	1	1	1	11½	4–5
06	Endre Steiner (Hungary)	0	½	½	0	0	x	1	1	0	1	½	1	1	1	1	1	½	1	11	6
07	Saviely Tartakower (Poland)	½	½	½	½	½	0	x	1	½	0	1	1	1	½	½	1	½	1	10½	7
08	Reuben Fine (United States)	0	0	½	0	½	0	0	x	½	½	½	1	1	1	1	½	1	1	9	8
09	Gideon Ståhlberg (Sweden)	½	0	½	½	1	1	½	½	x	0	0	1	½	½	0	1	½	½	8½	9
10	Vladas Mikėnas (Lithuania)	0	1	½	1	0	0	1	½	1	x	0	0	0	0	1	1	0	1	8	10
11	Ludwig Rellstab (Nazi Germany)	1	0	0	½	0	½	0	½	1	1	x	0	½	1	0	0	1	½	7½	11–13
12	Eero Böök (Finland)	1	0	0	½	0	0	0	0	0	1	1	x	½	1	1	0	1	½	7½	11–13
13	Fricis Apšenieks (Latvia)	0	0	½	½	½	0	0	0	½	1	½	½	x	0	1	1	½	1	7½	11–13
14	Teodors Bergs (Latvia)	½	0	0	½	0	0	½	0	½	1	0	0	1	x	0	1	1	½	6½	14
15	Movsas Feigins (Latvia)	0	0	0	0	½	0	½	0	1	0	1	0	0	1	x	0	½	1	5½	15–16
16	Salo Landau (Netherlands)	0	0	0	0	0	0	0	½	0	0	1	1	0	0	1	x	1	1	5½	15–16
17	Wolfgang Hasenfuss (Latvia)	0	0	0	0	0	½	½	0	½	1	0	0	½	0	½	0	x	0	3½	17–18
18	Karlis Ozols (Latvia)	0	½	0	0	0	0	0	0	½	0	½	½	0	½	0	0	1	x	3½	17–18

== Background ==
The German-born chess master Jacques Mieses covered the tournament as a correspondent for British, French, Spanish and American newspapers. On 5 July 1937 he was struck by a bus in Ķemeri; the injuries left him with a permanent limp.
