= Alfrēds Hartmanis =

Latvian chess player

Personal information
- Born: November 1, 1881 Riga, Russian Empire (now Latvia)
- Died: July 27, 1927 (aged 45) Riga, Latvia

Chess career
- Country: Russia; Latvia

Alfrēds Hartmanis (November 1, 1881 in Riga, Latvia – July 27, 1927 in Riga, Latvia) was a Latvian chess player who won the Baltic Chess Congress in 1913.

== Career ==
In 1900 Hartmanis became the Riga chess club member. In 1910 he participated in strong chess tournament in Warsaw and scored 9/15, with Akiba Rubinstein winning. In 1912 the All-Russian Masters Tournament in Vilno Hartmanis scored 10½/19.

In 1913 Hartmanis enjoyed the greatest success in his chess player career, with 11½/14 winning the VI Baltic Chess Congress in Mitau. After the World War I actively engaged in Latvian chess life's recovery, achieving good results in tournaments. In 1924 he participated in first Latvian Chess Championship and finished fourth behind Hermanis Matisons, Fricis Apšenieks and Kārlis Bētiņš. In 1926 in second Latvian Chess Championship Hartmanis placed fifth behind Apšenieks, Teodors Bergs, Vladimirs Petrovs and Augusts Strautmanis.

For many years Hartmanis worked as a tutor, but in 1920s few years served as a tax official.
