= Karel Skalička =

Czech-Argentine chess master

Karel Skalička (Spanish: Carlos Skalicka) (1 November 1896, in Prague – 30 December 1979, in Buenos Aires) was a Czech-Argentine chess master.

In 1924, he won a team gold medal for Czechoslovakia (Hromádka, Schulz, Vaněk, Skalička) in the 1st unofficial Chess Olympiad in Paris. He took 3rd in group eliminations (Anatol Tschepurnoff won), and tied for 21-31st in the major tournament (Karel Hromádka won). The final tournament (Amateur World Championship) was won by Hermanis Matisons.

In 1923, Skalička won in Prague. In 1923, he took 6th in Berlin. In 1924, he tied for 1st-2nd with Hromádka in Prague. In 1924, he tied for 4-5th in Prague (1st Kautsky memorial; Jan Schulz won). In 1925, he took 2nd, behind Matisons in Bromley. In 1925, he tied for 2nd-3rd in Prague (2nd Kautsky memorial). In 1926, he tied for 1st-3rd in Prague (3rd Kautsky memorial). In 1927, he tied for 2nd-4th in Prague (Hromádka won). In 1929, he tied for 6-8th in Prague (Salo Flohr won). In 1930, he took 6th in Prague (Flohr won). In 1930, he took 2nd, behind Flohr, in Prague. In 1931/32, he tied for 3rd-5th in Prague (8th Kautsky memorial; Emil Richter won). In 1932, he took 2nd in Prague (9th Kautsky memorial; Josef Dobiáš won). In 1934, he took 10th in Prague (11th Kautsky memorial; Karel Opočensky won). In 1935, he took 3rd in Prague (12th Kautsky memorial; Jiří Pelikán won). In 1936, he took 16th in Poděbrady. The event was won by Flohr.

Dr. Karel Skalička played for Czechoslovakia (Bohemia&Moravia in 1939) in three Chess Olympiads.

- In 1931, at first reserve board in the 4th Chess Olympiad in Prague (+9 –2 =3);
- In 1933, at first reserve board in the 5th Chess Olympiad in Folkestone (+3 –2 =0);
- In 1939, at fourth board in the 8th Chess Olympiad in Buenos Aires (+3 –4 =1).

He won an individual gold medal and a team bronze medal at Prague 1931, and a team silver medal at Folkestone 1933.

Following the outbreak of the World War II Skalička, along with many other participants of the 8th Olympiad, elected to stay in Argentina.

In 1945, Skalička tied for 2nd-5th with René Letelier, Enrique Reinhardt and Moshe Czerniak in Quilmes (Gideon Ståhlberg won). In 1945/46, he tied for 1st-2nd with Letelier, followed by Movsas Feigins, Jiří Pelikán, etc., in Buenos Aires (Círculo La Régence).
