= Mečislovas Birmanas =

Lithuanian chess player (1900–1950)

Personal information
- Born: 1900 Kaunas, Lithuania
- Died: 1950 (aged 49–50)

Chess career
- Country: Russian Empire; Lithuania; Soviet Union

Mečislovas Birmanas (Mechislovas Birmanas) (1900 – 1950) was a Lithuanian chess player who won the Lithuanian Chess Championship in 1943.

== Biography ==
Mečislovas Birmanas lived in Kaunas and worked as an accountant. He participated in Kaunas chess tournaments, including city chess championships. Before the start of World War II, Mečislovas Birmanas published a book of poems.

In 1942, he participated in the match between Lithuanian and Latvian trade union teams (won against Leonids Dreibergs and drew with Zigfrīds Solmanis).

Mečislovas Birmanas won the Lithuanian Chess Championship in 1943. In the tournament held in Vilnius, he scored 8½ out of 11 (+7, -1, =3) and shared 1st-3rd places with Romanas Arlauskas and Leonardas Abramavičius, and a month later he won an additional two-round tournament held in Kaunas (2½ out of 4).

After the end of the war, Mečislovas Birmanas participated in the Lithuanian SSR championship in 1945, where he scored 6 points out of 10 (+4, =4, -2) and shared 4th-6 places (Vladas Mikėnas became the champion of the republic).

For many years Mečislovas Birmanas had serious health problems. He died of pneumonia.
