= Endzelīns =

Endzelīns (feminine: Endzelīna) is a Latvian surname. Notable people with the surname include:

- Jānis Endzelīns (1873–1961), Latvian linguist
- Lūcijs Endzelīns (1909–1981), Latvian chess master, son of Jānis
