= Lūcijs Endzelīns =

Latvian-Australian chess master (1909–1981)

Personal information
- Born: 21 May 1909 Dorpat (Tartu), Estonia
- Died: 27 October 1981 (aged 72) Adelaide, Australia

Chess career
- Country: Latvia; Australia
- Title: ICCF Grandmaster (1959)
- ICCF rating: 2375 (July 1992)

Lūcijs "Lucius" Endzelīns (21 May 1909, Dorpat (Tartu), Estonia – 27 October 1981, Adelaide, Australia) was a Latvian-Australian chess master. He was the son of the Latvian linguist Jānis Endzelīns.

In 1932, Endzelins tied for 3rd-5th with Fricis Apšenieks and Movsas Feigins, behind Vladimirs Petrovs, and Teodors Bergs, at the Riga championship. He played for Latvia in three Chess Olympiads; on seventh board (+10 –6 =2) in the unofficial Olympiad at Munich 1936, as first reserve (+6 –2 =4) at Stockholm 1937, and on fourth board (+7 –5 =3) at Buenos Aires 1939. In the 1930s, Endzelins was married to the Latvian chess master Milda Lauberte (1918–2009).

At the end of World War II, Endzelīns, along with many other Baltic players (Arlauskas, Dreibergs, Jurševskis, Mednis, Ozols, Sarapu, Tautvaišas, Vaitonis, Zemgalis, et al.), escaped to the west just before the advancing Soviet forces arrived. In 1946, he played in Augsburg. The event was won by Wolfgang Unzicker. In 1946, he placed second, with 10.5/13, half a point behind Fedir Bohatyrchuk, in a round-robin event for displaced persons at Meerbeck. In 1947, he won, ahead of Elmārs Zemgalis and Efim Bogoljubow, at the Mattison Memorial Tourney in Hanau, Germany. Lūcijs Endzelīns migrated from Germany to Australia. He won the South Australian Championship eight times. He won the Australian championship in 1961.

Endzelīns was awarded the Correspondence Grandmaster title in 1959. He tied for 2nd place, with Lothar Schmid, behind Viacheslav Ragozin, in the 2nd World Correspondence Championship, held from 1956 to 1959. He took 7th in the 3rd WCCh, held in 1959–1962, and tied for 7–8th in the 5th WCCh, held in 1965–1968.
