= 4th Chess Olympiad =

1931 chess tournament in Prague, Czechoslovakia

The 4th Chess Olympiad (Czech: 4. Šachová olympiáda), organized by the Fédération Internationale des Échecs (FIDE) and comprising a team tournament, took place between July 11 and July 26, 1931, in Prague, Czechoslovakia. The 3rd Women's World Chess Championship also took place during the Olympiad.

== Results ==
=== Team standings ===
| # | Country | Players | Points |
|---|---|---|---|
| 1 | United States | Kashdan, Marshall, Dake, Horowitz, Steiner H. | 48 |
| 2 | Poland | Rubinstein, Tartakower, Przepiórka, Makarczyk, Frydman | 47 |
| 3 | Czechoslovakia | Flohr, Gilg, Rejfíř, Opočenský, Skalička | 46½ |
| 4 | Yugoslavia | Vidmar, Asztalos, Kostić, Pirc, König | 46 |
| 5 | Germany | Bogoljubow, Ahues, Wagner, Richter, Helling | 45½ |
| 6 | Latvia | Matisons, Apšenieks, Petrovs, Feigins, Hasenfuss | 45½ |
| 7 | Sweden | Ståhlberg, Stoltz, Berndtsson, Lundin | 45½ |
| 8 | Austria | Grünfeld, Spielmann, Kmoch, Becker, Lokvenc | 45 |
| 9 | Great Britain | Sultan Khan, Yates, Thomas, Winter, Wahltuch | 44 |
| 10 | Hungary | Steiner E., Steiner L., Vajda, Havasi, Sterk | 39½ |
| 11 | Netherlands | Weenink, Noteboom, Van den Bosch, Addicks, Van Doesburgh | 35 |
| 12 | Switzerland | Johner H., Naegeli, Zimmermann, Rivier, Michel | 34 |
| 13 | Lithuania | Mikėnas, Šeinbergas, Vistaneckis, Abramavičius, Luckis | 30½ |
| 14 | France | Alekhine, Gromer, Kahn, Betbeder, Duchamp | 29½ |
| 15 | Romania | Erdélyi, Balogh, Baratz, Gudju, Wechsler | 28 |
| 16 | Italy | Rosselli del Turco, Monticelli, Romi, Hellmann | 24 |
| 17 | Denmark | Andersen, Cruusberg, Ruben, Lie, Larsen | 19½ |
| 18 | Norway | Christoffersen, Hansen, Halvorsen, Hovind, Gulbrandsen | 15½ |
| 19 | Spain | Golmayo, Vilardebó, Soler, Marín y Llovet, Sanz Aguado | 15½ |

=== Team results ===
| Place | Country | 1 | 2 | 3 | 4 | 5 | 6 | 7 | 8 | 9 | 10 | 11 | 12 | 13 | 14 | 15 | 16 | 17 | 18 | 19 | + | − | = | Points |
|---|---|---|---|---|---|---|---|---|---|---|---|---|---|---|---|---|---|---|---|---|---|---|---|---|
| 1 | United States | - | 2 | 3½ | 1½ | 2 | 1½ | 2½ | 1½ | 2½ | 2½ | 2½ | 2 | 3 | 3 | 3½ | 3½ | 4 | 4 | 3 | 12 | 3 | 3 | 48 |
| 2 | Poland | 2 | - | 2½ | 2 | 3 | 1½ | 2 | 2 | 1½ | 3½ | 2½ | 2 | 3 | 3½ | 3 | 4 | 2½ | 4 | 2½ | 11 | 2 | 5 | 47 |
| 3 | Czechoslovakia | ½ | 1½ | - | 2½ | 1½ | 2½ | 2 | 2½ | 1½ | 3 | 2½ | 3 | 2½ | 2½ | 3½ | 3½ | 4 | 3½ | 4 | 13 | 4 | 1 | 46½ |
| 4 | Yugoslavia | 2½ | 2 | 1½ | - | 1 | 1½ | 2 | 2½ | 3½ | 2½ | 1½ | 2½ | 2½ | 3½ | 3 | 3 | 3½ | 3½ | 4 | 12 | 4 | 2 | 46 |
| 5 | Germany | 2 | 1 | 2½ | 3 | - | 2½ | 2 | 1½ | ½ | 2½ | 2½ | 3 | 2½ | 3 | 3 | 3 | 4 | 3½ | 3½ | 13 | 3 | 2 | 45½ |
| 6 | Latvia | 2½ | 2½ | 1½ | 2½ | 1½ | - | 2 | 2½ | 1½ | 1 | 3 | 2½ | 3 | 3 | 2½ | 2½ | 4 | 3½ | 4 | 13 | 4 | 1 | 45½ |
| 7 | Sweden | 1½ | 2 | 2 | 2 | 2 | 2 | - | 1 | 2 | 2½ | 3 | 4 | 3 | 2 | 3½ | 3 | 3½ | 3 | 3½ | 9 | 2 | 7 | 45½ |
| 8 | Austria | 2½ | 2 | 1½ | 1½ | 2½ | 1½ | 3 | - | 2½ | 1½ | 2½ | 2½ | 3 | 2½ | 4 | 3½ | 3 | 2½ | 3 | 13 | 4 | 1 | 45 |
| 9 | Great Britain | 1½ | 2½ | 2½ | ½ | 3½ | 2½ | 2 | 1½ | - | 2½ | 2½ | 3 | 1½ | 1½ | 3 | 3 | 3½ | 3½ | 3½ | 12 | 5 | 1 | 44 |
| 10 | Hungary | 1½ | ½ | 1 | 1½ | 1½ | 3 | 1½ | 2½ | 1½ | - | 1½ | 3 | 2 | 3 | 3 | 2½ | 3½ | 3½ | 3 | 9 | 8 | 1 | 39½ |
| 11 | Netherlands | 1½ | 1½ | 1½ | 2½ | 1½ | 1 | 1 | 1½ | 1½ | 2½ | - | 0 | 3½ | 2 | 2 | 2½ | 3 | 2 | 4 | 6 | 9 | 3 | 35 |
| 12 | Switzerland | 2 | 2 | 1 | 1½ | 1 | 1½ | 0 | 1½ | 1 | 1 | 4 | - | 3 | 2½ | 1 | 2½ | 2½ | 3 | 3 | 7 | 9 | 2 | 34 |
| 13 | Lithuania | 1 | 1 | 1½ | 1½ | 1½ | 1 | 1 | 1 | 2½ | 2 | ½ | 1 | - | 2 | 1 | 3 | 3 | 3 | 3 | 5 | 11 | 2 | 30½ |
| 14 | France | 1 | ½ | 1½ | ½ | 1 | 1 | 2 | 1½ | 2½ | 1 | 2 | 1½ | 2 | - | 1½ | 1½ | 3 | 3 | 2½ | 4 | 11 | 3 | 29½ |
| 15 | Romania | ½ | 1 | ½ | 1 | 1 | 1½ | ½ | 0 | 1 | 1 | 2 | 3 | 3 | 2½ | - | 3 | 1½ | 2 | 3 | 5 | 11 | 2 | 28 |
| 16 | Italy | ½ | 0 | ½ | 1 | 1 | 1½ | 1 | ½ | 1 | 1½ | 1½ | 1½ | 1 | 2½ | 1 | - | 2½ | 3½ | 2 | 3 | 14 | 1 | 24 |
| 17 | Denmark | 0 | 1½ | 0 | ½ | 0 | 0 | ½ | 1 | ½ | ½ | 1 | 1½ | 1 | 1 | 2½ | 1½ | - | 3½ | 3 | 3 | 15 | 0 | 19½ |
| 18 | Norway | 0 | 0 | ½ | ½ | ½ | ½ | 1 | 1½ | ½ | ½ | 2 | 1 | 1 | 1 | 2 | ½ | ½ | - | 2 | 0 | 15 | 3 | 15½ |
| 19 | Spain | 1 | 1½ | 0 | 0 | ½ | 0 | ½ | 1 | ½ | 1 | 0 | 1 | 1 | 1½ | 1 | 2 | 1 | 2 | - | 0 | 16 | 2 | 15½ |

=== Individual medals ===
For the first time, medals were awarded to the top three individual players on each board.

| Board 1 | | Board 2 | | Board 3 | | Board 4 | | Reserve | |
|---|---|---|---|---|---|---|---|---|---|
| (France) Alexander Alekhine | 13½ / 18; 75.0 | (Sweden) Gösta Stoltz | 13½ / 18; 75.0 | (Latvia) Vladimirs Petrovs | 11½ / 16; 71.9 | (Austria) Albert Becker | 10½ / 14; 75.0 | (Czechoslovakia) Karel Skalička | 10½ / 14; 75.0 |
| (Germany) Efim Bogoljubow | 12½ / 17; 73.5 | (Poland) Savielly Tartakower | 13½ / 18; 75.0 | (United Kingdom) George Alan Thomas | 12½ / 18; 69.4 | (Kingdom of Yugoslavia) Vasja Pirc | 12½ / 17; 73.5 | (United States) Herman Steiner | 8½ / 12; 70.8 |
| (United States) Isaac Kashdan | 12 / 17; 70.6 | (Hungary) Lajos Steiner | 12 / 17; 70.6 | (Czechoslovakia) Josef Rejfiř | 11 / 16; 68.8 | (Germany) Kurt Richter | 10½ / 15; 70.0 | (Latvia) Wolfgang Hasenfuss | 7½ / 11; 68.2 |
