= Leho =

Male given name

Voldemar
- Gender: Male
- Name day: 23 February

Origin
- Region of origin: Estonia

Other names
- Related names: Lehar, Lehto

Leho is largely an Estonian masculine given name. People with the name Leho include:

- Leho Laurine (1904–1998), Estonian chess master
- Leho Muldre (born 1940), Estonian orchestra conductor, horn player and music teacher
- Leho Pent (born 1990), Estonian weightlifter
- Leho Tedersoo (born 1980), Estonian mycologist and microbiologist
