= Lars Hansen =

Lars Hansen may refer to:

- Lars Hansen (basketball) (born 1954), retired Danish-Canadian basketball player
- Lars Peter Hansen (born 1952), economist and Nobel laureate

== See also ==
- Lars Hanson (1886–1965), Swedish actor
- Lars Hanssen (chess player) (1903–1940), Norwegian chess player
