= Wolfgang Hasenfuss =

Latvian chess player (1900–1944)

Wolfgang Hasenfuss (Latvian: Volfgangs Hāzenfuss; born December 11, 1900, Jēkabpils, Russian Empire – died October 6, 1944, Gotenhafen) was a Latvian chess master of Baltic German ethnicity.

He played for Latvia in Chess Olympiads and 3rd unofficial Chess Olympiad:

- In 1931, at first reserve board in 4th Chess Olympiad in Prague (+7−3=1);
- In 1933, at fourth board in 5th Chess Olympiad in Folkestone (+5−6=3);
- In 1935, at fourth board in 6th Chess Olympiad in Warsaw (+4−4=4);
- In 1936, at fifth board in 3rd unofficial Chess Olympiad in Munich (+7−7=3).

Hasenfuss won individual bronze medal in 1931.

He took 6th at Riga 1932 (Vladimirs Petrovs won), took 4th at Riga 1934 (LAT-ch, Fricis Apšenieks and Petrovs won), tied for 17th–18th at Kemeri 1937 (Samuel Reshevsky, Petrovs and Salo Flohr won), and took 10th at Kemeri / Riga 1939 (Flohr won).

In 1944 Hasenfuss was leading the Riga Chess Championship, but due to illness was forced to withdraw from the tournament. He died at a German hospital in Gotenhafen (today Gdynia, Poland).
