= Alfrēds =

Alfrēds is a masculine Latvian given name. Notable people with the name include:

- Alfrēds Andersons (1879–1937), Latvian civil engineer, intellectual, pedagogue, educational worker and mayor
- Alfrēds Hartmanis (1881–1927), Latvian chess player
- Alfrēds Kalniņš (1879–1951), Latvian composer, organist, pedagogue, music critic and conductor
- Alfrēds Kalniņš (1894–1960), Latvian racewalker
- Alfrēds Krauklis (1911–1991), Latvian basketball player and coach
- Alfrēds Rubiks (born 1935), Latvian politician
- Alfrēds Verners, Latvian footballer and ice hockey player
