= Malmberg =

Malmberg is a Swedish surname. Malmberg means "Iron Mountain", with Malm referring to iron ore and Berg referring to mountain. Berg could also reference town or village, so the name would then be "the village in which iron is mined", or "the mountain where we mine iron ore".

Notable people with the surname include:

- Aino Malmberg (1865–1933), Finnish writer and politician
- Bertil Malmberg (1889–1958), Swedish author, poet, and actor
- Betty Malmberg (born 1958), Swedish politician of the Moderate Party
- Claes Malmberg (born 1961), Swedish actor and stand-up comedian
- Eric Malmberg, Swedish musician
- Eric Malmberg (sport wrestler) (1897–1964), Swedish wrestler
- Erik Malmberg (1892–1934), Finnish chess player
- Harry Malmberg (1925–1976), American second baseman and coach in Major League Baseball
- Lauri Malmberg (1888–1948), Finnish general
- Malla Malmivaara (born 1982), also known as Laura Malmberg, Finnish actress and singer
- Myrra Malmberg, Swedish singer and musical artist
- Sylvia Malmberg (Sylvia Liljefors) (born 1944), Swedish curler
