= Baltic Chess Championship =

International chess tournament

The first Baltic Chess Congress took place in Riga, Latvia (then Russian Empire), in 1899. The winner was Robert Behting, the elder brother of Kārlis Bētiņš, who won a play-off game with Karl Wilhelm Rosenkrantz. The second Baltic Chess Congress was played in Dorpat, Estonia (then Russian Empire), in 1901. There were four winners.

The first Baltic Chess Championship was held in the city of Klaipėda, Lithuania, on May 22–27, 1931. The eight-player single round-robin tournament was won by Isakas Vistaneckis (LTU) 4.5/7, a half point ahead of S. Gordonas (LTU), Paul Saladin Leonhardt (GER), Vladas Mikėnas (EST/LTU) and Vladimirs Petrovs (LAT). The three others, Fricis Apšenieks (LAT), Aleksandras Machtas (LTU), and E. Gertschikoff (GER) finished in consecutive places.

== Winners ==
#	Year	City	Winner
1*	1899	Riga	Roberts Bētiņš (LAT), Karl Wilhelm Rosenkrantz (LAT)
2*	1901	Dorpat	Kārlis Bētiņš (LAT), Wilhelm von Stamm (LAT), Karl Wilhelm Rosenkrantz (LAT), W. Sohn (EST)
3*	1904	Reval	Bernhard Gregory (EST), Vladimir Ostrogsky (RUS)
4*	1907	Riga	Karl Wilhelm Rosenkrantz (LAT)
5*	1911	Libau	Arvid Kubbel (RUS)
6*	1913	Mitau	Alfrēds Hartmanis (LAT)
1	1931	Klaipėda	Isakas Vistaneckis (LTU)
?	?	?	
	1944/45	Riga	Paul Keres (EST)
	1945	Riga	Vladas Mikėnas (LTU)
	1946	Vilnius	Yuri Averbakh (RUS)
	1947	Pärnu	Paul Keres (EST)
	1950	Pärnu	Raul Renter (EST)
	1952	Pärnu	Kalju Pitksaar (EST)
	1955	Pärnu	Paul Keres (EST)
	1958	Pärnu	Yakov Yukhtman (UKR) & Taras Prokhorovich (UKR)
	1960	Pärnu	Paul Keres (EST)
	1961	Palanga	Iivo Nei (EST)
	1963	Estonia	Iivo Nei (EST)
	1964	Pärnu	Iivo Nei (EST)
	1965	Palanga	Vladas Mikėnas (LTU)
	1966	Naroch	Grigory Krupsky (BLR)
	1967	Jūrmala	Jānis Klovāns (LAT)
	1968	Pärnu	Alvis Vītoliņš (LAT)
	1969	Riga	Boris Rõtov (EST)
	1970	Pärnu	Andres Vooremaa (EST)
	1971	Pärnu	Leonid Stein (UKR)
	1973	Homel	Viacheslav Dydyshko (BLR)
	1974	Pärnu	Viacheslav Dydyshko (BLR)
	1975	Riga	Alvis Vītoliņš (LAT)
	1976	Klaipėda	Sergey Yuferov (BLR)
	1977	Homel	Gintautas Piešina (LTU)
	1978	Haapsalu	Lev Gutman (LAT)
	1979	Daugavpils	Jānis Klovāns (LAT)
	1981	Homel	Aloyzas Kveinys (LTU)
	1982	Pärnu	Alexander Ivanov (RUS)
	1985	Pärnu	Edvīns Ķeņģis (LAT)
	1986	Haapsalu	Alexander Shabalov (LAT), Edvīns Ķeņģis (LAT) & Alexander Malevinsky (RUS)
	1987	Kuldīga	Alexander Ivanov (RUS), Lembit Oll (EST) & Leonid Basin (RUS)
	1988	Panevėžys	Gintautas Piešina (LTU)
