= Addicks =

Addicks may refer to:

== People ==
- J. Edward Addicks, Philadelphia gas magnate
- Johannes Addicks, Dutch chess player
- Karl Addicks, German politician
- Lawrence Addicks, president of the Electrochemical Society

== Other uses ==
- Charlton Athletic F.C., a football club in south-east London
- Addicks, Houston, Texas
- Addicks Reservoir, Texas
- Addicks Estates, Delaware
