= Ion Gudju =

Romanian chess player

Ion Gudju (14 July 1897 – 1988) was a Romanian chess master.

Gudju represented Romania in 1st unofficial Chess Olympiad at Paris, where he became one of 15 founders of Fédération Internationale des Échecs (FIDE). He played thrice in Chess Olympiads at The Hague 1928, Hamburg 1930, and Prague 1931.

He took 4th at Hastings 1926/27 (B tournament, Georges Koltanowski won), took 2nd, behind Wechsler, at Bucharest 1927, took 4th at Bucharest 1928 (Sigmund Herland and Wechsler won), shared 2nd, behind Alexandru Tyroler, at Jassy 1929 (Romanian Chess Championship), took 5th and won at Bucharest 1929, and tied for 2nd-5th at Bucharest 1930 (Iosif Mendelssohn won).

He was the Honorary Vice President of FIDE in 1982–1988.
