= Alexander Malevinsky =

Personal information
- Full name: Alexander Alexandrovich Malevinsky
- Born: 26 February 1950
- Died: 2004 (aged 53–54)

Chess career
- Country: Soviet Union; Russia
- FIDE rating: 2350 (July 1996)
- Peak rating: 2460 (January 1980)

Alexander Alexandrovich Malevinsky (Russian: Александр Александрович Малевинский; 26 February 1950 – 2004) was a Russian chess master who won the Baltic Chess Championship in 1986.

== Biography ==
In 1975, became in Soviet chess master. Participated in the RSFSR Chess Championship finals. The best results - 7th place in 1976 and 10th place in 1980. In 1980 played for the Russian team "Lokomotiv" in the Soviet Team Chess Cup (+1-2=4). Malevinsky lived in Kaliningrad and has been a frequent guest on Baltic chess tournaments. In 1986 in the Estonia town Haapsalu, he shared 1st place with Alexander Shabalov and Edvīns Ķeņģis in the Baltic Chess Championship. Also participated in Lithuanian Chess Championships and Latvian Chess Championships. The best result in the Lithuanian Chess Championship was shared 2nd place with Oleg Dementiev in 1977. The best result in the Latvian Chess Championship was the 3rd place in 1975. In the last years of his life, Malevinsky due to family discord left an active chess player running. In 2004 autumn he died in hospital after a fight-related injury.
