= William Rivier =

Swiss chess player

William Rivier (12 December 1882 – 19 November 1974) was a Swiss mathematician, philosopher, and chess player.

Rivier was born in Bienne to a pastor in the Free Church of Vaud. One of his siblings was the artist Louis Rivier. William Rivier studied mathematics at the University of Nancy under Élie Cartan and subsequently became a mathematics teacher. He drew on his mathematical background for his later philosophical work, which he published in several volumes from 1937 until his death in 1974.

While mostly remembered for his philosophical work, Rivier was also one of the strongest Swiss chess players. He played for Switzerland in the 2nd Chess Olympiad at The Hague 1928, where he put up a score of +5 –1 =5 (68.2%) and took individual prize for 6th place. He also played in the 4th Chess Olympiad at Prague 1931. He tied for 9-12th at Bern 1932 (Alexander Alekhine won).
