= Līvija Endzelīna =

Latvian painter (1927–2008)

- Born: 30 October 1927; Riga, Latvia
- Died: 27 March 2008
- Known for: Painting
- Movement: Realism, Surrealism

Līvija Endzelīna (Latvian: Līvija Endzelīna; 30 October 1927 – 27 March 2008) was a Latvian painter mainly noted for her still life paintings. She was one of the most well known personalities in Latvian art of the 20th century. In 1989, she received the honorary title of Meritorious Artist of the Latvian SSR.

== Biography ==
Līvija Endzelīna was born on October 30, 1927 in Riga, Latvia. Her father, who was 54 when she was born, was the linguist Jānis Endzelīns, a highly regarded figure in Latvian culture. Her mother, Marta Grimma, was a well-known poet, translator and commentator in 1930s Latvia. Endzelīna’s first contact with art came in early childhood, thanks to her mother’s skill at drawing. Endzelīna studied at the Faculty of Architecture of the Latvian State University (1946–1948). From 1948 to 1953, she studied at the Faculty of Painting of the Latvian SSR State Academy of Art. She has been participating in exhibitions since 1960 and she was a member of the Artists Union of Latvia since 1964. In 1970s, she drew portraits of writers and cultural workers for the Latvian magazine Karogs.

Mother's Blouse (1985) by Endzelīna was one of the paintings shown in the project The Story of One Painting II (2019), which aimed to introduce works of art created in the period after the World War II and which can be seen in the Latvian National Museum of Art permanent exhibition Latvian art 1945–1985.

== Art ==
Endzelīna brought a new, original and highly subjective version of realistic painting to Latvian art. She considered her classmates to be her real teachers, especially Uldis Zemzaris, whom the artist married already in the second year of the academy in 1949. Endzelīna searched for her handwriting for a long time. The artist had a unique, quiet and reserved character, which can also be felt in her works: portraits and still lifes. Most of Endzelīna's portraits were made in the 60s. Portraits make up only about a tenth of Endzelīna's oeuvre, they capture the character of the personality. Self-portraits are the most numerically, but the models were also relatives and family members.

Her works of the 1990s are characterized by a darkened color and a relatively gloomy theme, which expresses concerns about the surrounding world, about evil, human cruelty. At the end of her life, at the beginning of the 21st century, the artist again turned to more frequent painting of seashells, and her works are characterized by warmer, more cheerful colors and a gentle character, with relatively less emphasis on materiality and more on the expression of color.

== Collections ==
Endzelīna's work is held in the collection of the Latvian National Museum of Art, the Lithuanian Art Museum, the Museum of the Artists’ Union of Latvia, among others.
