= Harris Kirkland Handasyde =

Scottish chess player

Personal information
- Born: 11 March 1877 East Lothian, Scotland
- Died: 24 May 1935 (aged 58) Paris, France

Chess career
- Country: United Kingdom

Harris Kirkland Handasyde (11 March 1877 – 24 May 1935) was a Scottish chess player.

== Biography ==
Harris Kirkland Handasyde was born in Scotland in East Lothian County. He spent his youth in British East Africa, where he first served as an officer during World War I. Later he continued his service at homeland. In 1915, Harris Kirkland Handasyde shared the 1st – 3rd place in Scottish Chess Championship, but did not win the title in an additional tournament. In 1923, he shared the 1st – 3rd place in the Edinburgh Chess Club Championship, but again did not win the title of champion in an additional tournament. In the same year, he won the Scottish Chess Team Championship Richardson Cup with the Edinburgh Chess Club. In 1924, Harris Kirkland Handasyde represented the British team in 1st unofficial Chess Olympiad. In 1926, he retired from the army and moved to Paris. Harris Kirkland Handasyde took an active part in the life of the British Chess Club in Paris, becoming its first president, and several times participated in the Paris Chess Championships (1925, 1926, 1927, 1930). He died of myocardial infarction.
