= Georges Renaud =

French chess player

Georges Renaud (8 January 1893, Nancy – 28 July 1975, Peille) was a French chess master, theoretician and organizer.

He won the first French Chess Championship at Paris 1923. He represented France in 1st unofficial Chess Olympiad at Paris 1924, and in the 1st Chess Olympiad at London 1927.

He is an author of "Le problème d'échecs" (1924) – jointly with Alain Campbell White, "Les échecs" (1945) – jointly with Victor Kahn, "L'art de faire mat" (1947), "Les six candidats au championnat du monde" (1948) "La partie espagnole" (1949), "Les échecs dans le monde 1951" (1952).
