= Edmond Lancel =

Belgian chess player

Personal information
- Full name: Edmond Emile Lancel
- Born: 3 July 1888
- Died: 15 April 1959 (aged 70)

Chess career
- Country: Belgium
- Title: International Arbiter (1952)

Edmond Emile Lancel (3 July 1888 – 15 April 1959) was a Belgian chess player.

== Biography ==
After graduation Edmond Lancel was chemistry engineer. He worked as a chess journalist for the Belgian magazine La Nation belge. In 1924, in Paris Edmond Lancel played for Belgium in 1st unofficial Chess Olympiad. In February 1925, he founded the chess magazine L 'Echiquier, published by Alexander Alekhine, Savielly Tartakower and other prominent chess players of that time. The magazine existed until the end of the 1930s.

Edmond Lancel was known as a chess tournament organizer and referee. In 1952 he became a FIDE International Arbiter (IA). Also Edmond Lancel participated in correspondence chess tournaments. He represented Belgium at the 1st World Correspondence Chess Olympiad (1946–1949).
