= Gerrit van Doesburgh =

Dutch chess player

Personal information
- Born: 26 October 1900
- Died: 24 April 1966 (aged 65)

Chess career
- Country: Netherlands

Gerrit Roelof Diederik van Doesburgh (26 October 1900 – 24 April 1966) was a Dutch chess player, Dutch Chess Championship silver medalist (1936).

== Biography ==
In the 1930s Gerrit van Doesburgh was one of the leading Dutch chess players. In 1936, in Rotterdam he ranked 2nd in Dutch Chess Championship behind winner Salo Landau.

Gerrit van Doesburgh played for Netherlands in the Chess Olympiad:

- In 1931, at reserve board in the 4th Chess Olympiad in Prague (+0, =0, -5).

Gerrit van Doesburgh played for Netherlands in the unofficial Chess Olympiad:

- In 1936, at first board in the 3rd unofficial Chess Olympiad in Munich (+1, =4, -13).
