= Sigmund Herland =

Romanian chess player

Sigmund Herland (September 27, 1865 – August 15, 1954) was a Romanian chess master and composer.

== Career ==
Herland drew a match with Jacques Mieses in 1890. He tied for 11-12th at Breslau 1912 (the 18th DSB Congress, Hauptturnier A, Bernhard Gregory won), and tied for 6-10th at Mannheim 1914 (interrupted 19th DSB–Congress, Hauptturnier A, B. Hallegua won).

After World War I, he played in many tournaments in Bucharest. Herland won in 1921; won in 1924; took 2nd (Quadrangular) and shared 1st in 1925; tied for 7-8th (Alexandru Tyroler won) and took 3rd in 1927 (Wechsler won); took 2nd, behind Taubmann, and shared 1st with Wechsler in 1928; took 2nd in 1929 (Ion Gudju won); took 11th (Iosif Mendelssohn won) and won in 1930.
