= Miervaldis Jurševskis =

Latvian-Canadian chess player and artist

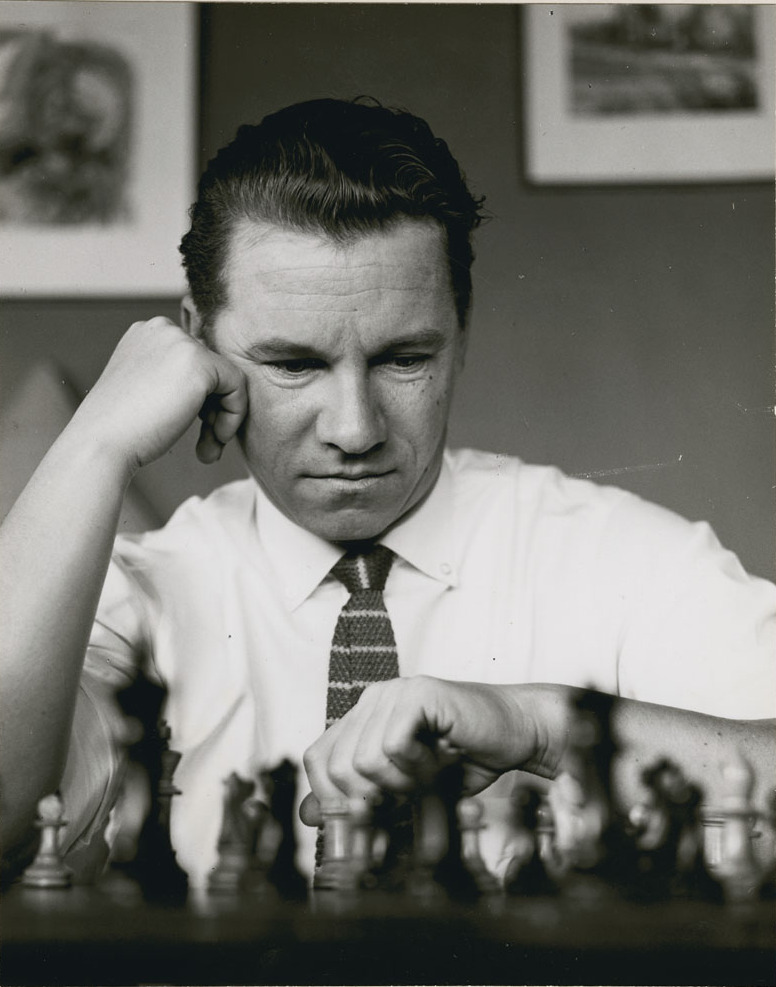

Miervaldis (Walter) Jurševskis (November 6, 1921 in Riga, Latvia – March 15, 2014 in Burnaby, British Columbia) was a Latvian-Canadian chess master, and a professional artist.

Jurševskis learned chess from his father at the age of six, but it was not until he entered the University of Latvia, where he studied art, that he became one of the brightest chess stars in Riga. He won numerous tournaments, including the one of Jūrmala, and most of the blitz contests he entered.

He fled Riga in 1944, just prior to the Soviet forces arriving. As a displaced person after World War II, he took place in several chess events in Germany, including Blomberg and Lübeck (both 1945), Meerbeck (1946), and Hanau (1947). In these events, Jurševskis played with strong players from the Baltic countries—along with German and Austrian masters—including Efim Bogoljubov, Friedrich Sämisch, Ludwig Rellstab, Elmārs Zemgalis, Lūcijs Endzelīns, Romanas Arlauskas, and Kārlis Ozols.

In 1948, Jurševskis emigrated to Canada, where he eventually settled in Vancouver. He won the British Columbia Championships six times (1949, 1950, 1954–57). He played in three Canadian Championships (1951, 1955, 1957), his best result occurring at Vancouver 1957 when he tied for third, behind Povilas Vaitonis and Géza Füster.

Jurševskis loved to play 5-minute blitz games; he eventually wrote a 14-page booklet in Latvian "Piecu minūšu partijas technika un taktika" (Five-Minute Game Technique and Tactics), Memmingen, 1946. By profession, Jurševskis was an artist, and he contributed many drawings to various chess magazines and has illustrated several chess books.
