= Karl Wilhelm Rosenkrantz =

Russian and Soviet chess player (1876–1942)

Karl (Carl) Wilhelm Rosenkrantz (Russian: Карл Вильямович Розенкранц, romanized: Karl Vilyamovich Rozenkrants; 13 June 1876 – 1942) was a Russian and Soviet chess player.

== Chess career ==
Rosenkrantz was born in Libava (now Liepāja, Latvia), then in the Courland Governorate of the Russian Empire. He shared 1st with Robert Behting (Roberts Betinš), followed by Kārlis Bētiņš, etc., at Riga 1899 (the 1st Baltic Chess Congress) and lost a play-off game to him, took 6th at Berlin 1899/1900 (Curt von Bardeleben won), tied for 8-9th at Munich 1900 (DSB Congress, Hauptturnier A, Rudolf Swiderski won), took 11th at Moscow 1901 (the 2nd All-Russian Masters' Tournament, Mikhail Chigorin won), shared 1st with K. Behting, Wilhelm von Stamm and W. Sohn at Dorpat 1901, and won at Riga 1907.

Before World War I, he played in many tournaments in St. Petersburg. He tied for 2nd-3rd (Eugene Znosko-Borovsky won) and 9-11th (Chigorin won) in 1904, took 2nd, 3rd and 4th in 1905, tied for 8-10th in 1905/06 (the 4th RUS-ch, Gersz Salwe won), shared 1st with Sergey von Freymann in 1908, tied for 7-8th in 1909 (Alexander Alekhine won), and took 14th in 1911 (Stepan Levitsky won).

Rosenkrantz lived in Moscow following the First World War and Russian Revolution and participated in several Moscow tournaments. He took 5th in 1921 (Moscow City Chess Championship, Nikolai Grigoriev won), took 5th in 1924 (Nikolai Zubarev won), took 14th in 1925 (Moscow-ch, Aleksandr Sergeyev won), tied for 8-9th in 1926 (Moscow-ch, Abram Rabinovich won), and shared 6th in 1928 (Trade Unions-ch, Grigoriev won).
