= Valentín Fernández Coria =

Argentine chess player

Personal information
- Born: July 1885
- Died: January 17, 1955 (aged 69) Buenos Aires

Chess career
- Country: Argentina

Valentín Fernández Coria (July, 1885 – January 17, 1955) was an Argentine chess player.

He was one of the strongest chess players of Argentina in the 1920s. He was repeated participant in Argentine Chess Championship in which he shared 2nd - 4th place in 1923/1924. In 1921/1922 in Montevideo Fernández Coria shared 2nd - 5th place in South American Chess Championship.

Fernández Coria played for Argentina in the unofficial Chess Olympiad:

- In 1924, at fourth board in the 1st unofficial Chess Olympiad in Paris (+2, =6, -5).

Fernández Coria played for Argentina in the Chess Olympiad:

- In 1928, at first board in the 2nd Chess Olympiad in The Hague (+1, =3, -4).
