= Matafia Šeinbergas =

Lithuanian chess player (1909–2002)

Personal information
- Born: 17 November 1909 Jurbarkas, Lithuania
- Died: 11 September 2002 (aged 92) Toronto, Canada

Chess career
- Country: Lithuania

Matafia Šeinbergas (also Matafia Šembergas or Matafia Scheinberg; 17 November 1909 — 11 September 2002) was a Lithuanian chess player, medical scientist (immunologist, microbiologist, virologist), and the father of Isai Scheinberg, founder of PokerStars.

== Biography ==
In 1926, Šeinbergas moved to Kaunas, to study at the Health Sciences faculty of Kaunas University. In October 1926, he ranked 1st in the chess tournament in Kaunas. In 1927, Šeinbergas participated in six player double round robin chess tournament in Kaunas, the winner of which won the right to play a match with Aleksandras Machtas, the chess champion of Kaunas city. The tournament was won Marcos Luckis, but Šeinbergas shared the 3rd–4th place. He was a strong amateur chess player without deep theoretical knowledge.

Matafia Šeinbergas played for Lithuania in the Chess Olympiads:

- In 1930, at second board in the 3rd Chess Olympiad in Hamburg (+5, =2, -9),
- In 1931, at second board in the 4th Chess Olympiad in Prague (+3, =4, -7).

In 1930, Šeinbergas graduated from the clinical medicine faculty of the prestigious University of Pisa in Italy. After the 4th Chess Olympiad in 1931, he stopped playing in chess tournaments. During the Spanish Civil War, Šeinbergas joined the International Brigades and from 1937 to 1939 fought in Spain. After the disintegration of the Republican army at the beginning of 1939, Šeinbergas was interned in camps for defeated Spanish Republicans in France. From the camp he returned to Kaunas, where he married Fania Katz. The couple had two sons: Modesto (1940) and Isai (1946).

From 1941, Šeinbergas served in the Red Army. From 1942 to 1945, he was a doctor in the 16th Lithuanian Division. During the World War II, he was awarded the Order of the Patriotic War and Order of the Red Star. When World War II ended, Šeinbergas was in Berlin, and held the rank of Colonel.

In 1945, he settled in Vilnius and dedicated most of his time to medical career. He went on from 1946 to 1958 to work as a chief physician at the Vilnius Infants' Home. In 1957, he published a book about the Spanish Civil War. From 1958 to 1984, Šeinbergas worked as a researcher at the Epidemiology, Microbiology and Hygiene Institute in Vilnius. At the same time, he wrote health education brochures. Šeinbergas also continued his education, successfully defending his Doctor of Sciences thesis, on the role of lymphocytic choriomeningitis virus in prenatal human pathology, in 1980, at the age of 71.

In 1993, Šeinbergas moved to Canada. He was buried in a Jewish cemetery in Richmond Hill.
