= Kalju Pitksaar =

Estonian chess player

Personal information
- Born: May 18, 1931 Tallinn, Estonia
- Died: September 26, 1995 (aged 64) Tallinn, Estonia

Chess career
- Country: Estonia; Soviet Union; Estonia

Kalju Pitksaar (18 May 1931, Tallinn – 26 September 1995, Tallinn) was an Estonian chess player, who won the Estonian Chess Championship.

== Biography ==
Pitksaar first participated in the Estonian Chess Championships in 1947, at the age of 16. In the Estonian Chess Championships, he has won gold (1957) and two silver (1951, 1958) medals.

In 1950, he was second in the traditional National Tournament in Pärnu. In 1952, Pitksaar won th Baltic Chess Championship. In 1952, in the Soviet Chess Championships quarterfinal in Krasnodar, he shared 2nd - 3rd place. In 1958, Pitksaar played for Estonia in the Soviet Team Chess Championship in Vilnius, where his team finished in fourth place.

In the same year, Pitksaar's chess career was suddenly interrupted - he was disqualified with formulation to "improve his behavior". For more than 20 years, he did not participate in a chess tournaments. In 1981, he returned and won the Tallinn Chess Championship. His last chess tournament was the Correspondence Chess Olympiad semifinal (1992-1996).
