= Niels Lie =

Danish chess player

Personal information
- Born: unknown
- Died: unknown

Chess career
- Country: Denmark

Niels Lie (unknown — unknown), was a Danish chess player, Danish Chess Championship silver medalist (1928).

== Biography ==
From 1923 to 1949 Niels Lie participated regularly in the Danish Chess Championships, where he achieved his best result in 1928, when he ranked in 2nd place.

Niels Lie played for Denmark in the Chess Olympiad:

- In 1931, at fourth board in the 4th Chess Olympiad in Prague (+0, =7, -9).
