= Stephen Francis Smith =

Stephen Francis Smith (1860 or 1861, Ontario, Canada – 12 May 1928, London, England) was a Canadian chess master.

Born in Ontario, Canada, he emigrated with his family to London, England, in the mid-1870s. Following in his father's profession Smith trained as a doctor, eventually becoming a Member of the Royal College of Surgeons and a Licentiate of the Apothecaries' Society. He played in the British Chess Championship and at Hastings (1895, 1919, 1927/28) but never in the Premier. Smith won the City of London Chess Club championship in 1895 and placed second in 1905/06. He shared 6th in the London 1899 chess tournament (the Minor Tourney, Frank James Marshall won), participated in the Ostend 1907 chess tournament (C tournament), took 4th at Deal 1907 (George Alan Thomas won), tied for 10-11th at Oxford 1910 (Henry Ernest Atkins won), and tied for 6-8th at London 1910 (W. Ward won).

During World War I, he left the British Isles for North America. He won the Vancouver Chess Club championship in the Spring of 1915, but there is no mention of there being a British Columbia championship in 1915. Smith is first mentioned as a B.C. Champion in the August 1925 edition of BCM. He challenged Sydney Gale to Canadian Chess Championship match 1920 (abandoned by Gale after +1 –1).

Smith played in 1st unofficial Chess Olympiad at Paris 1924 as the sole representative of Canada. He was one of the 15 delegates from all over the World who signed the proclamation act of the International Chess Federation (originally known as Fédération Internationale des Échecs, FIDE) on 20 July 1924.
