= Leon Loewenton =

Romanian chess player

Personal information
- Born: 6 January 1889 Galați, Romania
- Died: 23 September 1963 (aged 74) Paris, France

Chess career
- Country: Romania; France

Leon Loewenton (6 January 1889 – 23 September 1963) was a Romanian and French chess player, International Judge of Chess Compositions (1956).

== Biography ==
In 1924, in Paris Leon Loewenton played for Romania in 1st unofficial Chess Olympiad. In subsequent years, he became more widely known as chess composer. Leon Loewenton composed more than 1200 chess compositions, in his work touched on such rare topics as retrograde analysis and helpmate. In 1956 he became FIDE International Judge of Chess Compositions. In 1962, Leon Loewenton emigrated to France.
