= Luis Argentino Palau =

Argentine chess player (1896–1971)

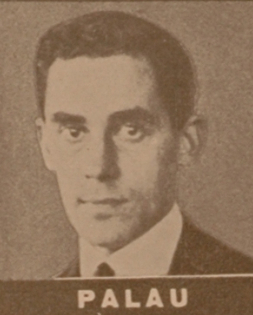
Palau in 1928

Luis Argentino Palau (September 11, 1896 – February 8, 1971) was an Argentine chess master.

He played for Argentina in three Chess Olympiads.

- In 1924 at 1st unofficial Chess Olympiad in Paris (+5 –4 =4);
- In 1927 at 1st Chess Olympiad in London (+7 –4 =4);
- In 1928 at 2nd Chess Olympiad in The Hague (+9 –5 =2).

In 1921/22, he tied for 10-12th in Montevideo (Roberto Grau won). In 1925, he won in Montevideo. In 1928, he took 2nd, behind Grau, in Mar del Plata (1st it). In 1934/35, he tied for 3rd-4th in Buenos Aires (Luis Piazzini won).

Palau was awarded the International Master (IM) title in 1965.
