= Kārlis Mīlenbahs =

Latvian linguist (1853–1916)

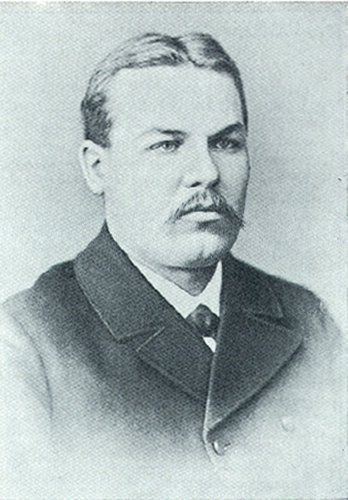
- Born: 18 January 1853; Kandava parish, Courland Governorate, Russian Empire (now Latvia)
- Died: 27 March 1916 (aged 63); Võru, Livonian Governorate, Russian Empire (now Estonia)
- Occupations: Lexicographer; Philologist

Kārlis Mīlenbahs (his surname was formerly also written as Mühlenbach, Mühlenbachs, Mǖlenbachs or Mīlenbachs) (18 January 1853 in Courland, Russian Empire – 27 March 1916 in Võru, Livonia, Russian Empire) was the first native speaker of Latvian to devote his career to linguistics.

Mīlenbahs studied classical philology at the Imperial University of Dorpat (he did not remain at the university because of his poverty). He worked as a school teacher in Jelgava and Latvia until the end of his life.

He published his first magazine article in 1881; after 1890, he authored over a hundred scholarly articles on the language in Latvian, Russian, and German.

He became the first chairman of the Orthography Commission at the Latvian Society's Science Union.

His main achievement was the Latvian-German dictionary that remains the most important lexicographical work on Latvian. The first four volumes were printed posthumously between 1923 and 1932 in Riga; the dictionary was completed and expanded by Jānis Endzelīns, with whom Mīlenbahs co-wrote other works, including a major Latvian grammar.

His polemics with the poet Rainis led to an important essay on literary Latvian published in 1909. He was also a translator of part of the Odyssey (1890–95).

== Family ==
He was married to Marija Kronberga and they had a son named Kārlis.

== Legacy ==
The Kārlis Mīlenbahs Prize in applied Latvian linguistics is named after him.

A high school in Kandava is also named after him.
