= Giovanni Cenni =

Italian chess player

Giovanni Cenni (29 December 1881 – 14 March 1957) was an Italian chess master.

He won twice Bologna City championships (1911, 1912), took 4th at Rome 1911 (unofficial Italian Chess Championship, V Torneo dell'Unione Scacchistica Italiana, Matteo Gladig won), tied for 2nd-3rd at Viareggio 1912 (I Torneo "L'Italia Scacchistica", Alberto Batori won), took 3rd at Bologna 1913 (II Torneo "L'Italia Scacchistica", Arturo Reggio won), took 2nd, behind A. Reggio, at Milan 1916 (I Torneo Nazionale "Crespi"), took 2nd, behind Stefano Rosselli del Turco, at Milan 1922 (III Torneo Nazionale "Crespi"), and tied for 7-8th at Bologna 1925 (Mario Monticelli won).

He participated in 1st unofficial Chess Olympiad at Paris 1924, and shared 8th in the Consolation Cup.
