= Josef Dobiáš =

Czech chess player

Personal information
- Born: 24 December 1886 Mladá Boleslav, Austria-Hungary
- Died: 31 January 1981 (aged 94)

Josef Dobiáš (24 December 1886 – 31 January 1981) was a Czech chess player.

At the beginning of his career, he took 5th at Prague 1908 (B tournament), tied for 4–5th at Plzeň 1911, tied for 5–7th at Breslau 1912 (the 18th DSB Congress, Hauptturnier B), took 6th at 1913 Mladá Boleslav 1913 (Karel Hromádka won), and took 8th at Česká Třebová 1913, and shared 1st at Brno 1916.

After World War I, he tied for 6–8th at Prague 1924/25 (the 1st Kautsky Memorial, Jan Schulz won), tied for 3rd–5th at Prague 1930, tied for 8–12th at Mnichovo Hradiště 1933.

In the period between 1939 and 1945 (the Protectorate of Bohemia and Moravia), he took 12th at Rakovník 1940 (Championships of Bohemia and Moravia, won by Jan Foltys), won the Kautsky Memorial in 1940, took 12th at Choceň 1942 (Miroslav Katětov won), took 6th at Prague 1943 (UJCS-17.Kongress), and took 14th at Brno 1944 (Karel Opočenský won).
