= Louis Rivier =

Swiss painter

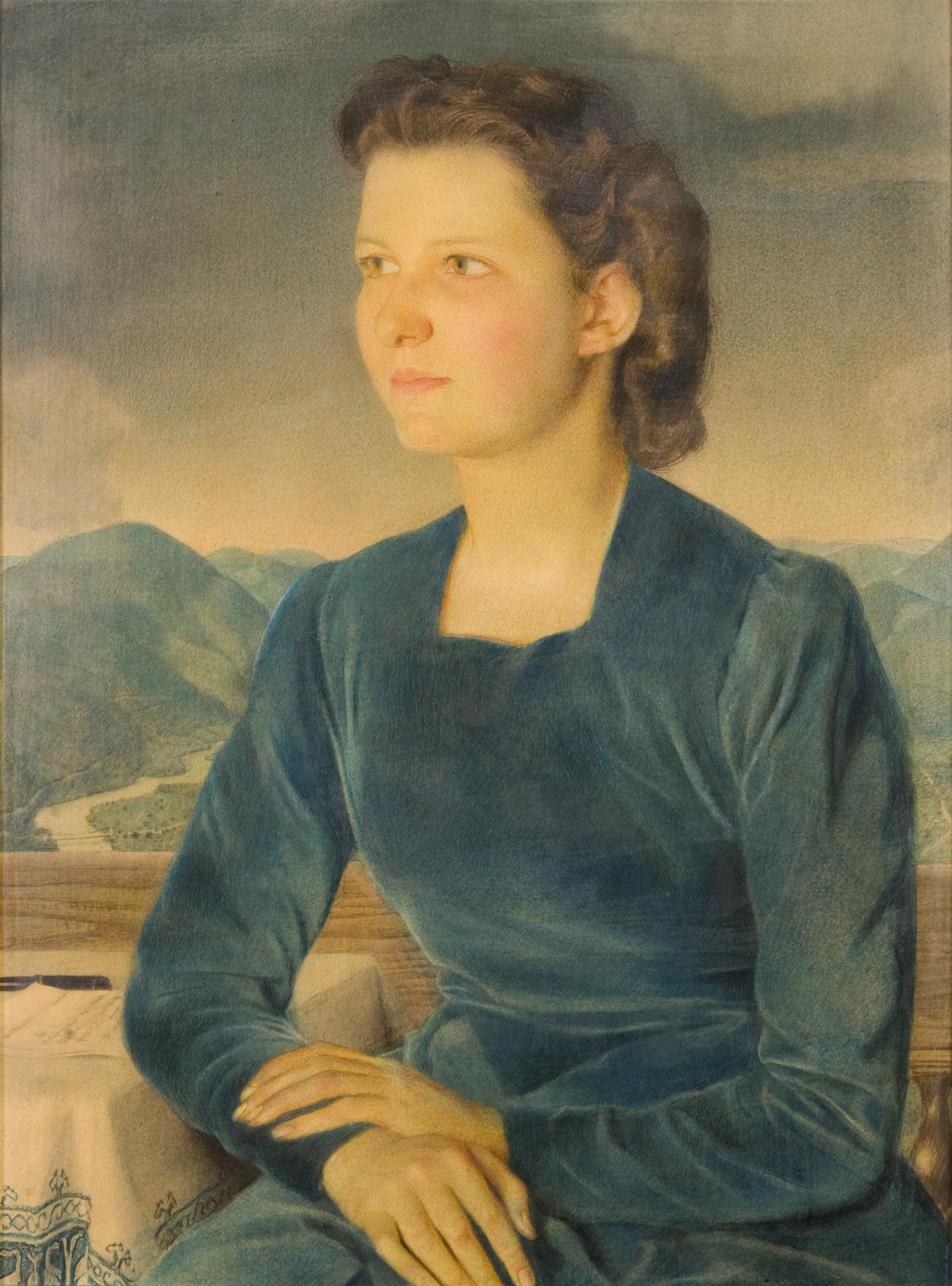
- Louis Rivier, Jeune femme à la robe bleue (Young woman in blue dress); 66 x 50 cm, 1947, special process Private collection

Louis Rivier (22 May 1885 in Bienne – 20 January 1963 in Lausanne) was a Swiss painter, writer, and stained glass artist.

== Biography ==
Louis's father Charles-William Rivier was a pastor of the Free Church of Vaud, and one of his siblings was the mathematician and philosopher William Rivier.

Louis was drawn to painting by Eugène Burnand and Paul Robert. A member beginning in 1901 of the Waldensian Society of Fine Arts, which he would chair between 1929 and 1932, he moved to Paris in 1904 to learn painting and worked in the studio of Jean-Paul Laurens at the Académie Julian. He then traveled to Belgium and Italy, fascinated by the primitive Flemish and Italian Renaissance. He exhibited at the Salon de la Société nationale des beaux-arts in Paris in 1914. Though he was a member of the Protestant Church and strongly supported by the elite, Louis managed to break the mistrust of his church. From religious inspiration, elevated to the rank of "art missionary," his work is found in Protestant churches as frescoes or stained glass, notably in Mex, Bercher, Denezy, Bottens or in the Lausanne churches of Terreaux, de Villard or de Saint-Jean de Cour. He is the author of 17 stained glass windows in the cathedral of Lausanne (6 windows in the north transept in collaboration with F. Ribeaupierre, and 11 high windows in the choir). He also decorated the Greek Orthodox Church of Lausanne Agios Gerassimos.

In 1910, lacking the means to achieve before 1906 the paintings provided by the architect Gaspard André, Louis Rivier offered a monumental decoration for the Palais de Rumine. In 1914 Jean-Jacques Mercier offered to finance the artist for the duration of the work; Rivier participated in the decoration of his Château Mercier in Sierre in 1907. The work of l'Aula began in 1915, which would last until 1923 and represented 1,000 square meters of paint. The style Rivier chose was in harmony historicist architecture of the palace and the destination of l'Aula. The mural combines science, art, and religion in the service of uplifting humanity, and a religious character consistent with the outcome of the Reformation. But the work of Rivier expresses an ambivalent feeling towards science which to certain details of the work, we note that it is rather subject to theology which he matches, in a very medieval vision from their reports. The sides which are represented by twelve allegorical figures of faculties are overhung by an entire vault dedicated to religion. On April 21, 1923, the newly transformed l'aula was the setting for the Conférence de Lausanne sur le Moyen-Orient (Lausanne Conference on the Middle East).

The decoration of l'Aula of the Palais de Rumine made the artist celebrated in the region thanks to laudatory book reviews published in the press. It won its author the title of Dr. Honoris causa of the University of Lausanne. In 1925, Rivier exhibited his works at the Grenette in front of the palace. It would attend other national and international exhibitions of sacred art. He became a recognized painter, a member of fine art societies in London, Paris, etc. His art criticism developed along with a biography devoted to his friend, the painter Paul Robert. Between 1937 and 1939, Rivier abandoned the tempera and invented a special process combining crayons, chalk, paint thinner and spray. In 1940, self-portrait in red and beret among the collection of the Uffizi Gallery in Florence. But if Rivier's technique evolved, his classic sources of inspiration hardly changed. The post-war period left it marginalized, even if its production characterized by easel painting and large murals continued to be appreciated in German Switzerland and abroad where he received a gold medal at the Salon de la Société des artistes français à Paris in 1949 and also the Conseil supérieur des récompenses "Arts, Sciences, Lettres" in Paris in 1958.

A major solo exhibition was dedicated to him in Rome in 1952. He became a corresponding member of the Institut de France and the Royal Society of Arts in London in 1948 and 1952, respectively.

After 1963, various exhibitions were held in Switzerland, notably at the Musée cantonal des Beaux-Arts (MCBA) in Lausanne in 1985, the Kunsthaus in Aarau in 1986, at the Galerie Paul Vallotton in Lausanne in 1993, and the Musée historique de Lausanne (MHL) in 2013, on the fiftieth anniversary of the artist's death.

== Sources ==
- "Louis Rivier". SIKART Lexicon on art in Switzerland.
- Matthias Oberli: "Louis Rivier" in German, French and Italian in the online Historical Dictionary of Switzerland, 5 January 2012.
- Louis Rivier, Le peintre Paul Robert, Delachaux et Niestlé, Neuchâtel et Paris, 1927
- Richard Heyd, Rivier, Delachaux et Niestlé, Neuchâtel et Paris, 1943
- Francesco Sapori, Rivier, Libera Signoria delle Arti, Roma, 1952
- Dictionnaire biographique de l'art suisse, Zurich, 1998, vol. 2, p. 877-878
- Dario Gamboni, Louis Rivier (1885-1963) et la peinture religieuse en Suisse romande, Payot Lausanne, 1985
- Arthur-Louis Hofer, Eglise de Saint-Jean Lausanne, Editions Belle Rivière, Lausanne, 1997
- Dave Lüthi, Les chapelles de l'Eglise libre vaudoise, Lausanne, 2000, p. 175-179
- Véronique Mauron, Marie-Odile Vaudou, Marie André, Anne Chaves-Rivier, Laurent Golay, François Boespflug, Edith Carey, David Auberson,
- Christophe Gallaz, Louis Rivier, L'intimité transfigurée, Till Schaap éditions, Berne, 2013
