= Jan Schulz =

Czech chess player

Jan Schulz (May 1899 – May 1953) was a Czech chess master.

He took 2nd, behind Karel Opočenský, at Belun 1916; won at Prague 1920, tied for 6-8th at Prague 1921 (Karel Hromádka and František Treybal won), tied for 5-7th at Brno 1921 (Hromádka, Karel Treybal and Ladislav Prokeš won), and won at Prague 1924 (1st Kautsky Memorial).

Schulz played for Czechoslovakia in 1st unofficial Chess Olympiad in Paris in 1924, and won the team gold medal there. He also played in the 2nd Chess Olympiad at The Hague 1928.

He tied for 3rd-5th at Bratislava 1925 (Richard Réti won), took 6th at Bardejov 1926 (Hermanis Matisons and Savielly Tartakower won), took 5th at Trencianske Teplice (Karl Gilg and Boris Kostić won), shared 1st with Karel Skalička and Prokop at Prague 1926 (3rd Kautsky Memorial), tied for 5-8th at Prague 1927 (Hromádka won), took 2nd, behind Opočensky, at Brno 1929, and tied for 5-6th at Mnichovo Hradiště (Efim Bogoljubow won).
