= Edvīns Ķeņģis =

Latvian chess grandmaster (born 1959)

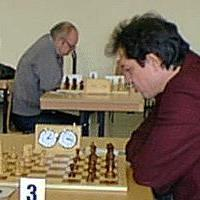
- Edvins Kengis, 2000 at Wattenscheid

Personal information
- Born: April 12, 1959 (age 67) Cēsis, Latvia

Chess career
- Country: Latvia
- Title: Grandmaster (1991)
- FIDE rating: 2493 (July 2026)
- Peak rating: 2594 (July 2002)
- Peak ranking: No. 54 (July 1992)

Edvīns Ķeņģis (born 12 April 1959, in Cēsis) is a Latvian chess Grandmaster.

Ķeņģis is an eight-time Latvian Champion, winning the national contest in 1984, 1987, 1988, 1989, 1990, 1997, 2004 and 2005. He won the Baltic Chess Championship at Pärnu 1985 and shared first place with Alexander Shabalov and Alexander Malevinsky at Haapsalu 1986.

He won at Boston open 1989, tied for 2nd–4th at Lloyds Bank open 1990, won the Estonian National Championship in Pühajärve in 2001, tied for 3rd–5th at Kilingi-Nõmme (EST-ch, Kaido Külaots won), won the Golden Cleopatra tournament in Egypt in 2003, won the inaugural Jyri Vetemaa Memorial tournament at Pärnu 2004, and tied for 2nd–3rd with Vadim Malakhatko at the 2009 Al Saleh 8th International Open in Yemen.

Ķeņģis represented Latvia six times in Chess Olympiads (1992–1998 and 2002–2004), once in the 3rd World Chess Team Championship at Lucerne 1993, and twice in the European Team Chess Championship at Pula 1997 and Leon 2001.

He was awarded the IM title in 1982 and the GM title in 1991.

== Notable games ==
- Edvins Kengis vs. Garry Kasparov, Vilnius LTU 1973, Sicilian Defense: Sozin Attack, Leonhardt Variation (B88), ½–½
- Larry Christiansen vs. Edvins Kengis, Manila 1992, Alekhine Defense: Modern, Larsen Variation (B04), 0–1
- Edvins Kengis vs. Francisco Vallejo-Pons, Bled Olympiad 2002, Wade Defense: General (A41), 1–0
