= Luigi Miliani =

Italian chess player

Personal information
- Born: 17 September 1875 Livorno, Italy
- Died: 19 November 1944 (aged 69) Venice, Italy

Chess career
- Country: Italy

Luigi Miliani (17 September 1875 – 19 November 1944) was an Italian chess player.

== Biography ==
Luigi Miliani lived most of his life in Venice where he worked as a hydraulics engineer. He has written scientific books on the rivers of Northern Italy and the Venetian Lagoon.

Luigi Miliani was also known as a chess player and organizer of chess life. From 1900 to 1903, he was one of the publishers of the chess magazine Nuova Rivista degli Scacchi. Luigi Miliani was first President of the Italian Chess Federation (from 1920 until his death in 1944, with a brief break in 1924) and organizer of the first International Chess Tournament in Venice in 1929. He participated in Italian chess tournaments - in 1906 in Milan and in first Italian Chess Championship in 1921, as well as international chess tournaments Trieste in 1923 and Merano in 1924. In 1924, in Paris Luigi Miliani played for Italy in the 1st unofficial Chess Olympiad.
