= Leho Tedersoo =

Estonian mycologist

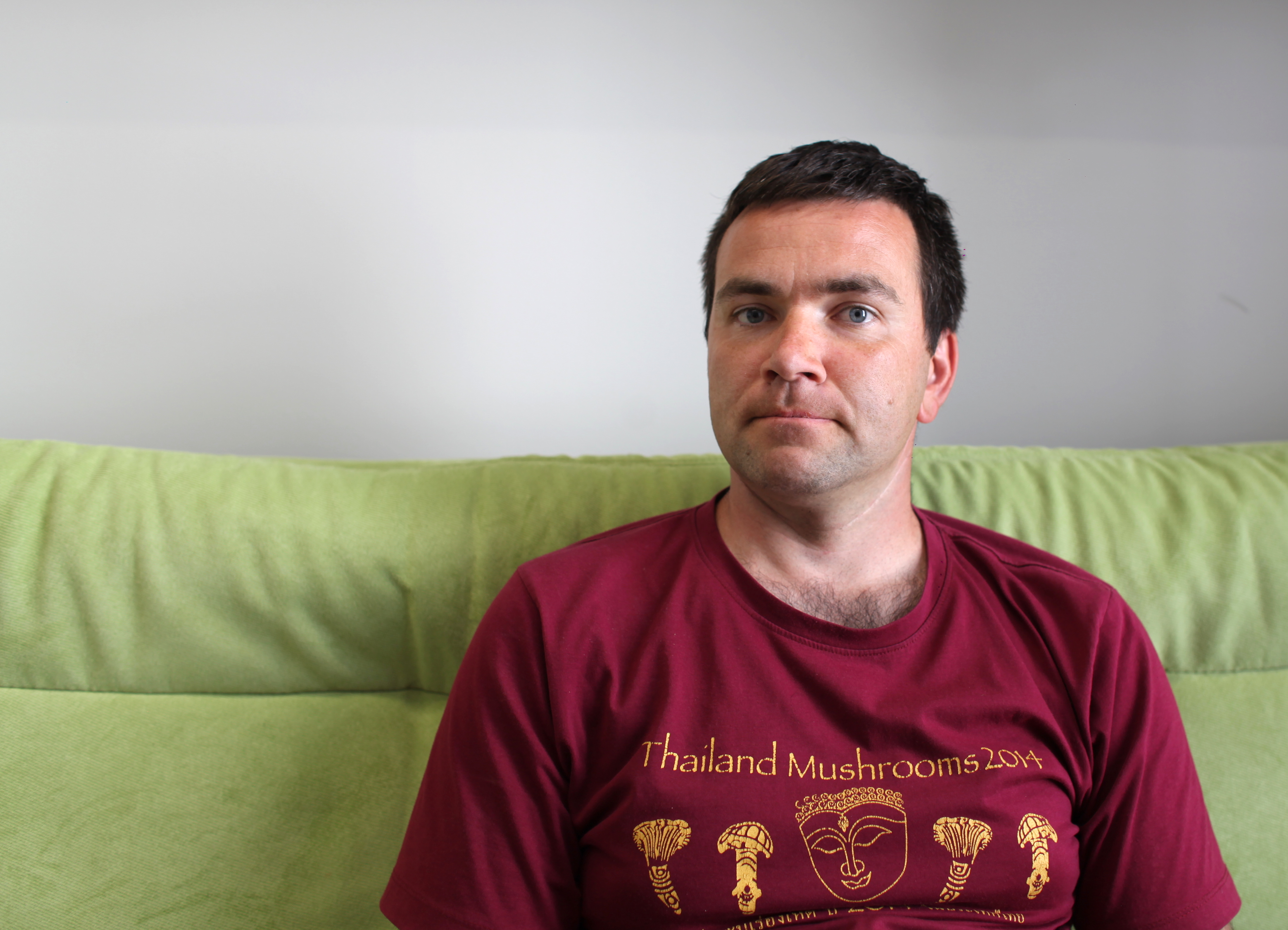
- Born: April 3, 1980 (age 46)
- Education: University of Tartu
- Scientific career
- Fields: Mycology; Soil ecology
- Workplaces: University of Tartu
- Author abbrev. (botany): Tedersoo

Leho Tedersoo (born 3 April 1980) is an Estonian mycologist and microbiologist.

He has described the following taxon:

- Coltricia australica L.W.Zhou, Tedersoo & Y.C.Dai, 2013

== Selected publications ==
- Tedersoo, L.; Bahram, M.; Zobel, M. (2020). "How mycorrhizal associations drive plant population and community biology". Science. 367 (6480) eaba1223. doi:10.1126/science.aba1223. PMID 32079744.
- Tedersoo, L.; Sánchez-Ramírez, S.; Kõljalg, U.; Bahram, M.; Döring, M.; Schigel, D.; May, T. W.; Ryberg, M.; Abarenkov, K. (2018). "High-level classification of the Fungi and a tool for evolutionary ecological analyses". Fungal Diversity. 90: 135–159. doi:10.1007/s13225-018-0401-0. hdl:10138/238983.
- Tedersoo, L.; Anslan, S.; Bahram, M.; Põlme, S.; Riit, T.; Liiv, I.; Kõljalg, U.; Kisand, V.; Nilsson, H.; Hildebrand, F.; Bork, P.; Abarenkov, K. (2015). "Shotgun metagenomes and multiple primer pair-barcode combinations of amplicons reveal biases in metabarcoding analyses of fungi". MycoKeys (10): 1–43. Bibcode:2015MycoK..10....1T. doi:10.3897/mycokeys.10.4852.
- Tedersoo, L.; Bahram, M.; Põlme, S.; Kõljalg, U.; Yorou, N. S.; Wijesundera, R.; Ruiz, L. V.; Vasco-Palacios, A. M.; Thu, P. Q.; Suija, A.; Smith, M. E.; Sharp, C.; Saluveer, E.; Saitta, A.; Rosas, M.; Riit, T.; Ratkowsky, D.; Pritsch, K.; Põldmaa, K.; Abarenkov, K. (2014). "Global diversity and geography of soil fungi" (PDF). Science. 346 (6213) 1256688. doi:10.1126/science.1256688. PMID 25430773.
- Tedersoo, L.; May, T. W.; Smith, M. E. (2010). "Ectomycorrhizal lifestyle in fungi: Global diversity, distribution, and evolution of phylogenetic lineages". Mycorrhiza. 20 (4): 217–263. Bibcode:2010Mycor..20..217T. doi:10.1007/s00572-009-0274-x. PMID 20191371.
- Tedersoo, L.; Nilsson, R. H.; Abarenkov, K.; Jairus, T.; Sadam, A.; Saar, I.; Bahram, M.; Bechem, E.; Chuyong, G.; Kõljalg, U. (2010). "454 Pyrosequencing and Sanger sequencing of tropical mycorrhizal fungi provide similar results but reveal substantial methodological biases". New Phytologist. 188 (1): 291–301. Bibcode:2010NewPh.188..291T. doi:10.1111/j.1469-8137.2010.03373.x. PMID 20636324.
