= Kārlis Bētiņš =

Latvian chess player (1867–1943)

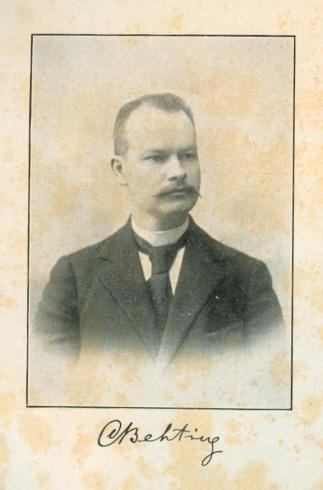
Kārlis Bētiņš in 1908

Kārlis Bētiņš (German: Carl Behting; 27 October 1867, Bērzmuiža – 28 March 1943, Riga) was a Latvian chess master and composer of studies.

He tied for 3rd-5th place at Riga 1899 (the 1st Baltic Congress, his brother Roberts Bētiņš won), took 3rd place at Riga 1900 (won by T. Muller), won at Riga 1900 and 1901, shared 1st place with Karl Wilhelm Rosenkrantz, W. Sohn and Wilhelm von Stamm at Dorpat (Tartu) 1901 (the 2nd Baltic Congress), and tied for 3rd-4th place at Reval (Tallinn) 1904 (Bernhard Gregory won).

In 1902–1910, he was a co-editor with Paul Kerkovius of the Baltische Schachblätter.

After World War I, he took 3rd place, behind Hermanis Matisons and Fricis Apšenieks, at Riga 1924 (1st LAT-ch). Bētinš played for Latvia in the 1st unofficial Chess Olympiad at Paris 1924 (+7 –4 =2), where he took 4th place (team) and tied for 4-7th place in Consolation Cup (individual; Karel Hromadka won).

The Latvian Gambit (1.e4 e5 2.Nf3 f5) was named as a tribute to Kārlis Bētiņš, who analyzed it in the early part of the 20th century.
