= Boris Baczynsky =

American chess player (1945–2008)

Personal information
- Born: October 14, 1945 Vienna, Austria
- Died: January 2008 (aged 62) Philadelphia, Pennsylvania

Chess career
- Country: United States
- Title: FIDE Master (1983)
- Peak rating: 2400 (July 1978)

Boris Baczynsky (Note: Ukrainian: Борис Бачинський, romanized: Borys Bachynskyi) (14 October 1945 – January 2008, also spelled Baczynski) was an American chess master.

Baczynsky was born in Vienna. Joining the westward exodus in 1944 – because of the Red Army's approach – the Baczynsky family from Ukraine wound up in Vienna. Then they immigrated to the United States. He was an editor of the Chess World Magazine. He died in the United States.
