= Gheorghe Davidescu =

Gheorghe Davidescu (March 30 [O.S. March 18] 1892 – January 3, 1973) was a Romanian lawyer and career diplomat. He is notable as Romanian ambassador to the USSR in the early phase of World War II. He received the ultimatum to allow the Soviet occupation of Bessarabia and northern Bukovina on behalf of his government on 26 June 1940.

== Early life ==
Davidescu was born in Brașov, when the city belonged to Austria-Hungary. His parents, George and Paraschiva (née Vlaicu), lived in the Șcheii Brașovului neighborhood, and had him baptized at the local Romanian Orthodox St. Nicholas Church. He held a law doctorate from the University of Budapest. He took part in the Hungarian campaign of the First World War.

== Career ==
In 1921, Davidescu became secretary of the Romanian legation at Budapest. He kept this job until 1925, when he became secretary of the Romanian embassy at the Ministry of Foreign Affairs. He then became secretary of the Romanian embassy at Warsaw in 1927, in 1932 promoted to adviser of the legation. From 1933 to 1935, he was then the liaison adviser at the Ministry of Foreign Affairs, and from 1935 to 1939, he was the Minister Plenipotentiary in Tallinn.

On 1 October 1939, he was appointed Minister Plenipotentiary in Moscow. On 13 June, he informed Molotov that the Romanian government had agreed to appoint Anatoly Lavrentiev as the minister of the Soviet Union in Bucharest. On 21 June, Lavrentiev arrived at the North Railway Station from Tiraspol. He was welcomed cordially by a senior adviser in the Ministry of Foreign Affairs. According to a government newspaper, his wife was given a "splendid wreath of white roses". The same newspaper added on Lavrentiev's arrival: "Without making any statement, Mr. Minister of the USSR and the suite set off at the headquarters of the legation on Kiseleff Road." The silence of the Soviet representative was received by the Romanian people with surprise. A Nazi newspaper mentioned that "by sending the new minister to Bucharest, the Soviet Union proved its desire to normalize relations between the two countries". In the same story, the newspaper drew the readers' attention to some official talks that were planned to take place within the week between Romania's foreign minister and Lavrentiev. These talks were presented as certain, yet never happened.

Late in the evening of 26 June, at 22:00, Davidescu was summoned to the Soviet headquarters of the Commissariat of Foreign Affairs, where he was handed without any explanation the ultimatum forcing Romania to cede Bessarabia.

While Alexandru Cretzianu was on vacation from 8 August to 9 September 1941, Davidescu filled his place as the Secretary-General of the Ministry of Foreign Affairs. A decree signed by ad interim Vice President of the Council of Ministers, Mihai Antonescu, made him the permanent Secretary-General on 11 October. He held this position until 1 September 1944, when he resigned.

Although attacked by the press after the Soviet occupation of Romania, Davidescu managed to avoid arrest.
