= Iosif Mendelssohn =

Romanian chess player

Iosif (Josef) Mendelssohn (? – ?) was a Romanian chess master.

At the beginning of his career, he took 7th at Debrecen 1913 and tied for 4-5th at Kaschau 1918, both in B tournaments.

After World War I, Mendelssohn played in many tournaments in Bucharest. He took 5th in 1924 (Sigmund Herland won), took 3rd (Quadrangular, Alexandru Tyroler won) and shared 1st with Herland in 1925, tied for 4-6th in Romanian Chess Championship (Tyroler won) and tied for 7-8th (Wechsler won) in 1927, took 5th (Taubmann won) and took 3rd (Herland and Wechsler won) in 1928, shared 1st with Wechsler and tied for 3rd-4th (Gudju won) in 1929, took 5th (Abraham Baratz won), took 2nd (behind Herland), took 3rd (Quadrangular, Taubmann won), and finally won in 1930.

He also took 4th at Jassy (Iaşi) 1929 (ROM-ch, Tyroler won), and took 6th at Cernăuţi 1930 (ROM-ch, János Balogh won).

Mendelssohn played for Romania in 2nd unofficial Chess Olympiad at Budapest 1926, and won team bronze medal there.
