= Anatol Tschepurnoff =

Russian-Finnish chess player (1871–1942)

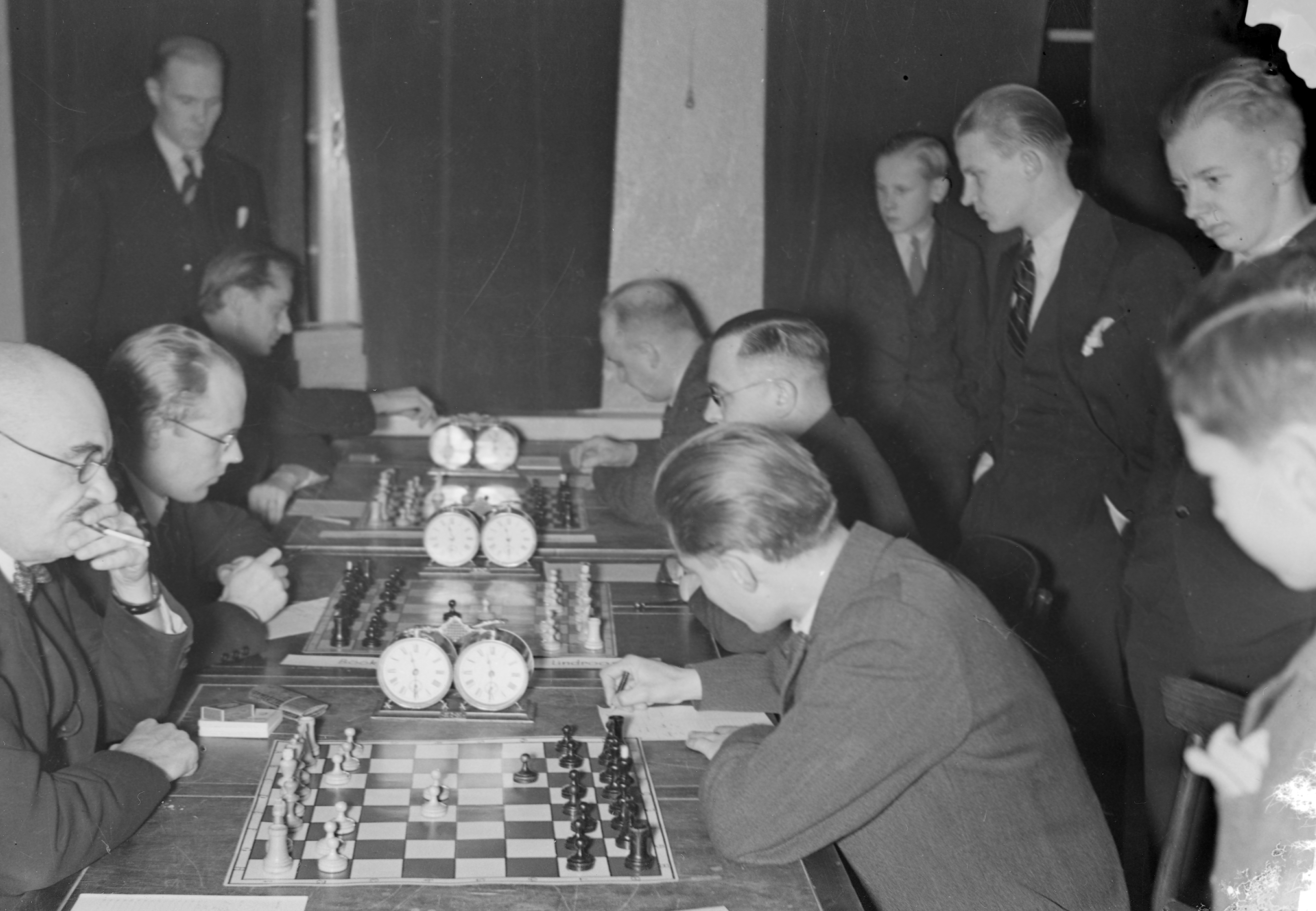
Shakkiturnaus 1935

Anatol (Anatoly) Tschepurnoff (Tchepurnoff, Chepurnov, Czepurnow) (19 December 1871, Loviisa – 29 April 1942, Helsinki) was a Russian–Finnish chess master.

Before World War I, he played in many tournaments at Saint Petersburg. In 1903, he took 5th. In 1904, he took 9th (Eugene Znosko-Borovsky won), took 2nd (Grigory Helbach won), tied for 4-5th (Koyalovich won). In 1908, he tied for 7-8th (Sergey von Freymann and Rosenkrantz won). In 1909, he took 14th (Alexander Alekhine won), tied for 7-8th (Grigory Levenfish won). In 1911, he took 8th (Fyodor Duz-Chotimirsky and Znosko-Borovsky won), tied for 5-6th (Ilya Rabinovich and Platz won). In 1913, he took 3rd.

After the war, he won 1st Finnish Championship in 1922. He played in 1st unofficial Chess Olympiad at Paris 1924. He was 1st in Qualification Group 7, and tied for 4-6th in Championship Final (1st World-ch Amateurs; Hermanis Matisons won). On 20 July 1924, fifteen delegates signed the proclamation act of the Federation Internationale des Echecs (FIDE). The 15 founders were Abonyi (Hungary), Grau (Argentina), Gudju (Romania), Marusi (Italy), Nicolet (Switzerland), Ovadija (Yugoslavia), Renalver y Zamora (Spain), Rawlins (Great Britain), Rueb (Netherlands), Skalička (Czechoslovakia), Smith (Canada), Towbin (Poland), Tschepurnoff (Finland), Vincent (France), and Weltjens (Belgium).

In 1926, he took 3rd in Budapest. In 1927, he represented Finland at first board (+4 –7 =4) in the 1st Chess Olympiad in London. In 1928, he tied for 12–14th in The Hague (2d FIDE World Amateur Championship; Max Euwe won). In 1929, he took 7th in Gothenburg. (14th Nordic-ch; Gideon Ståhlberg won). In 1930, he took 3rd in Stockholm (15th Nordic-ch; Erik Andersen won). In 1930, he tied for 2nd-4th in Helsinki (Eero Böök won). In 1931, he lost a match to Böök (4,5 : 5,5).
