= Johannes Addicks =

Dutch chess player

Personal information
- Born: 4 January 1902 Amsterdam, Netherlands
- Died: 8 March 1961 (aged 59) Renkum, Netherlands

Chess career
- Country: Netherlands

Johannes Hermanus Addicks (4 January 1902 – 8 March 1961) was a Dutch chess player, Dutch Chess Championship silver medalist (1936).

== Biography ==
Johannes Addicks was a member of the famous watchmaker family in Amsterdam. In the 1920s and 1930s he was one of the leading Dutch chess players, participating in several international chess tournaments held in the Netherlands.

In 1925, in a simultaneous exhibition Johannes Addicks defeated the future world chess champion Alexander Alekhine.

Johannes Addicks played for Netherlands in the Chess Olympiad:

- In 1931, at fourth board in the 4th Chess Olympiad in Prague (+8, =4, -4).
