= Otto Zimmermann =

Swiss chess player

Personal information
- Born: 11 September 1892
- Died: 24 July 1979 (aged 86)

Otto Zimmermann (11 September 1892 – 24 July 1979) was a Swiss chess master.

He won Swiss Chess Championship at Interlaken 1924, and represented Switzerland in 1st unofficial Chess Olympiad at Paris 1924, where shared 8th in the Consolation Cup. He also participated in official Chess Olympiads at London 1927, Prague 1931, and Amsterdam 1954.

Zimmermann had his best results in the 1920s, when he tied for 2nd-3rd at Neuchâtel 1922, took 3rd at Bern 1923, shared 1st at Margate 1923 (B tournament), tied for 10–11th at Zurich 1925, took 2nd at Geneva 1926, and took 6th at Basel 1928.

After World War II, he played in several friendly matches: Switzerland vs. France (1946), vs. Argentina (1950), vs. Belgium (1950), vs. West Germany (1952).

He shared 3rd at Zurich Seniors 1962.
