= Lars Hanssen (chess player) =

Norwegian chess player

Personal information
- Born: 30 August 1903 Trondheim, Norway
- Died: 1940

Chess career
- Country: Norway

Lars Hanssen (30 August 1903 – 1940) was a Norwegian chess player and chess composer, Norwegian Chess Championship silver medalist (1926, 1932).

== Biography ==
In the 1930s Lars Hanssen was one of the leading Norwegian chess players. He twice won silver medal in the Norwegian Chess Championship: in 1926 and 1932. In 1930, he won minor tournament in Nordic Chess Championship. In 1936, Lars Hanssen with chess club Schakklubben av 1911 won Norwegian Team Chess Championship.

Lars Hanssen played for Norway in the Chess Olympiad:

- In 1931, at second board in the 4th Chess Olympiad in Prague (+2, =3, -11).

== Chess composition ==
L. Hanssen

"Fodor Illustrations-Verlag", 1930,
1st prize

Position: a8 black rook, e8 white knight, h8 black king, d7 white pawn, h7 black pawn, b6 black pawn, f6 black pawn, d5 black knight, d4 white pawn, g2 white pawn, h2 white king

White to move and win

His main achievement in chess composition is the victory in the competition of etudes of the magazine Fodor Illustrations-Verlag (1930). Then Hansssen managed to get ahead, in particular, Leonid Kubbel.

Solution: 1. Nd6 (threatens 2. Nc8). 1... Nf4 2. d5 Rg8 3. Ne8 Rxg2+ 4. Kh1, and White win.
