= Erik Malmberg (chess player) =

Finnish chess player

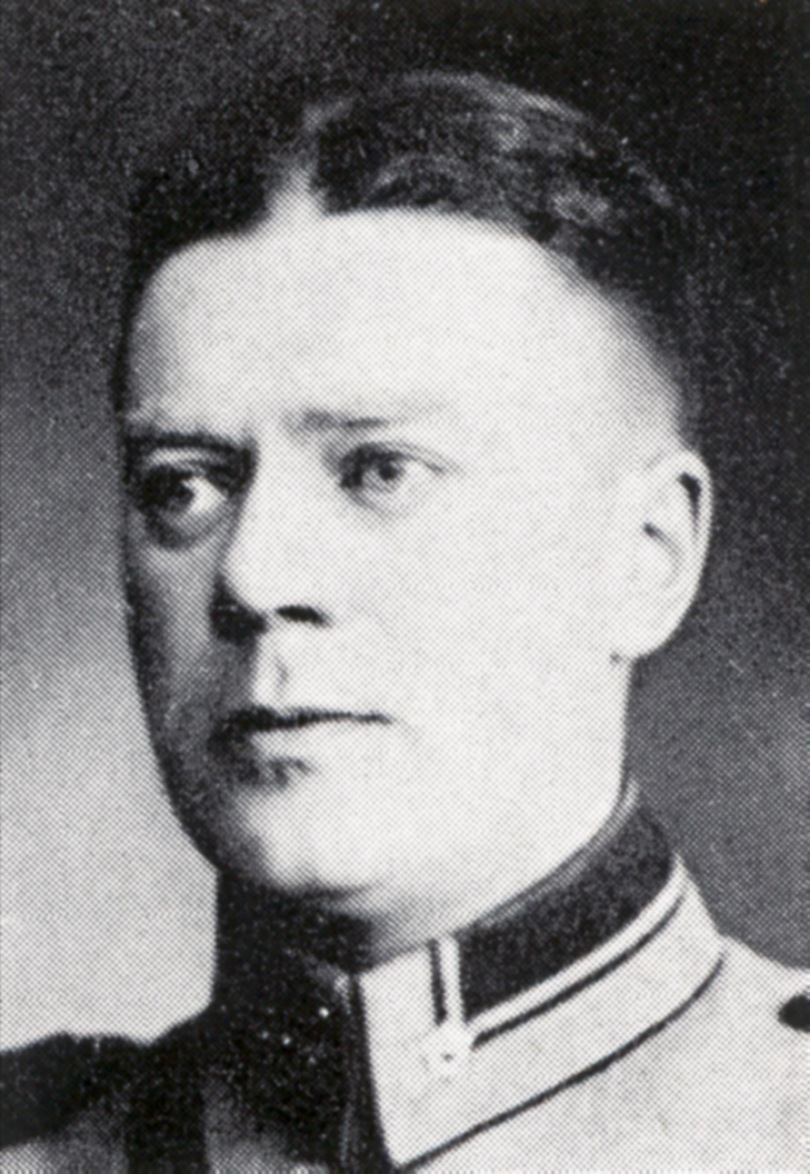

Personal information
- Born: 23 April 1892 Helsinki, Finland
- Died: 13 August 1934 (aged 42)

Chess career
- Country: Finland

Erik Malmberg (23 April 1892 – 13 August 1934) was a Finnish chess player.

== Biography ==
From 1912 to 1915, Eric Malmberg studied medicine at University of Helsinki. At first World War I he underwent military training at the cadet school. During Finnish Civil War, Eric Malmberg fought on the side of Whites. He was a communications officer, communications commander of the Karelian army, later served to the General Staff of the Finnish Army. After the Civil War, Eric Malmberg was on the Honorary Council of the General Staff of the Finnish Army (1925—1932). He resigned as lieutenant colonel. On May 15, 1926, as the former head of the second department of the statistical bureau of the General Staff of the Finnish Army, he was awarded the Latvian Order of the Three Stars IV degree.

Eric Malmberg was also known as one of the leading Finnish chess players. In 1924, in Paris he represented Finland in 1st unofficial Chess Olympiad. From 1924 until the end of his life Eric Malmberg worked as a chess columnist in various Finnish periodicals.
