= Povilas Tautvaišas =

Povilas Tautvaišas (English: Paul Tautvaisas / Tautvaisis) (6 May 1916 in Mogilev – November 1980 in Chicago) was a Lithuanian-American chess master.

== Biography ==
He played twice for the Lithuanian team in the Chess Olympiads, at eighth board (+4 –8 =2) at Munich 1936 (unofficial Olympiad), and at fourth board (+5 –9 =6) in the 8th Olympiad at Buenos Aires 1939, during which World War II broke out. Tautvaisas returned to Europe and took 5th, behind Birmanas, Arlauskas, Abramavičius, and Vaitonis, at the 1943 Lithuanian chess championship in Vilnius.

At the end of the war, Tautvaišas, along with many other Baltic players, escaped to the West, ahead of the advancing Soviet forces. There were many tournaments organized in Germany in the late 1940s, and most of these consisted of Germans and "displaced persons" - mostly from the Baltics. Tautvaišas took 3rd, behind Arlauskas and Endzelins, in the "Baltic Displaced Persons" (Lithuania, Latvia and Estonia) championship, which was held in Blomberg. In 1946, he tied for 3rd-4th with Sämisch, behind Unzicker and Zemgalis, in Augsburg. In 1947, he took 12th in Kirchheim-Teck. In 1948, he tied for 3rd-5th in Esslingen. In 1948, he won in Oldenburg.

Tautvaisas then moved to Boston in 1949, then finally to Chicago in 1950. He was many-time Chicago and Illinois champion, and his prominence in the Chicago area in the 1950s and 1960s earned him the nickname "The Old Fox". In 1956, he tied for 2nd-3rd with Arthur Bisguier, behind Donald Byrne, in Detroit (Tartakower Memorial). In 1957, he tied for 3rd-5th in Milwaukee (New Western Open). In 1957, he tied for 6th-16th in Milwaukee (North-Central Open). In 1958, he tied for 2nd-3rd with Theodorovych, behind Pal Benko, in Milwaukee (NCO). In 1959, he took 19th in Milwaukee (Western Open).
