= Wilhelm von Stamm =

Latvian chess player

Wilhelm von Stamm (died 17 January 1905) was a Latvian chess master.

He won at Riga 1899 (the 1st Baltic Congress, B tournament), took 4th at Riga 1900 (T. Muller won), tied for 11th-12th at Riga 1900/01 (Kārlis Bētiņš won), shared 1st with Karl Wilhelm Rosenkrantz, K. Behting and W. Sohn at Dorpat 1901 (the 2nd Baltic Congress), won at Riga 1902, took 18th at Kiev 1903 chess tournament (the 3rd All-Russian Masters' Tournament, Mikhail Chigorin won), and took 10th at Reval 1904 (Bernhard Gregory and V. Ostrogsky won).
