= Jānis Endzelīns =

Latvian linguist (1873–1961)

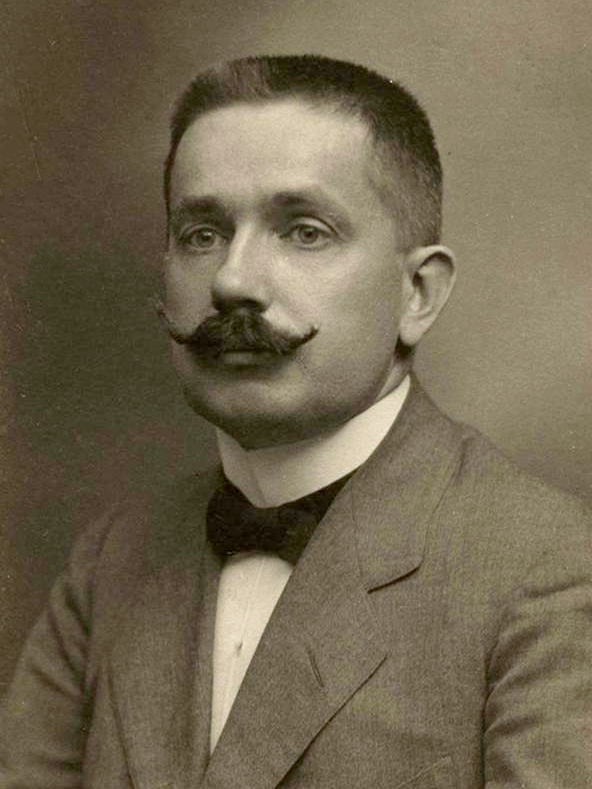
- Born: 22 February 1873; Kauguri Parish, Governorate of Livonia, Russian Empire (now Latvia)
- Died: 1 July 1961 (aged 88); Koknese, Latvian SSR, Soviet Union
- Education: University of Dorpat
- Spouse: Marta Grimma
- Children: 3, including Lūcijs and Līvija
- Relatives: Hermanis Enzeliņš (brother)
- Awards: Order of the Three Stars; Order of Lenin; Order of the Red Banner of Labour; Order of the Red Star; Order of the White Lion; Order of the Lithuanian Grand Duke Gediminas

Jānis Endzelīns (22 February 1873 – 1 July 1961), sometimes known by the Russian name Ivan Martynovich Endzelin (Russian: Иван Мартынович Эндзелин), was a Latvian linguist. He graduated from the University of Tartu. In 1908, he and Kārlis Mīlenbahs developed the modern Latvian alphabet, which slowly replaced the old orthography used before.

He was elected a foreign member of the Royal Netherlands Academy of Arts and Sciences in 1936. His son was chess master Lūcijs Endzelīns and his daughter Līvija Endzelīna became a successful painter.
