= Axel Cruusberg =

Danish chess player

Personal information
- Born: 30 December 1901 Odense, Denmark
- Died: 16 August 1962 (aged 60) Copenhagen, Denmark

Chess career
- Country: Denmark

Axel Crone Cruusberg (30 December 1901 — 16 August 1962), was a Danish chess player.

== Biography ==
In the 1930s, Axel Cruusberg was one of Danish leading chess players. From 1922 to 1935, Cruusberg took part in the Danish Chess Championships, where he achieved his best result in 1925, when he ranked in fourth place. He three times won the Copenhagen Chess Championship: in 1931, 1937 and 1943. From 1942 to 1944, he worked in Danish chess magazine, Skakbladet.

Axel Cruusberg played for Denmark in the Chess Olympiad:

- In 1931, at second board in the 4th Chess Olympiad in Prague (+1, =3, -11).
