= Abe Turner =

American chess player

Personal information
- Born: 1924 New York City, New York
- Died: October 25, 1962 (aged 38) New York City, New York

Chess career
- Country: United States
- FIDE rating: 2400

Abraham Turner (1924 – October 25, 1962) was an American chess master. He had a chess rating over 2400 and played several times in the U.S. Chess Championship. He was best known as a blitz chess hustler, and was one of few masters who had a winning record against Bobby Fischer. The games were when Fischer was 14, which was the same year Fischer won his first U.S. Championship. In fact, his last round draw with Turner in the 1957 Championship clinched first for the young Fischer.

Turner was born in New York City, learning how to play chess in 1943 at a naval hospital while recovering from shrapnel wounds inflicted during World War II. It was said Turner played chess mostly by grabbing a pawn and swapping pieces to reach an endgame. He frequented the Chess and Checkers Club of New York in Times Square next to the New Amsterdam Theatre, better known as the "flea house," where anyone could play chess for ten cents an hour. Fischer also attended the club and was a student of Turner's. Turner placed second in the Manhattan Chess Club championship on five occasions. He considered his best performance to be fourth place at the U.S. Open at Long Beach, California in 1955, but tied for first shortly after at San Diego with William Lombardy and James Sherwin.

Turner was found stabbed to death in the basement of an Upper West Side building where he had been working as a clerk for Al Horowitz for the magazine Chess Review. He had sustained nine wounds and his body had been placed inside a safe. He was found by the superintendent of the building later that afternoon. After the body was discovered, the police arrested a clerk-typist employed by the publication, who said he killed Turner (and dragged the body along a corridor to the safe) because Secret Service agents had told him to. Turner, who was 38, never married and lived with his father.
