= Josef Rejfíř =

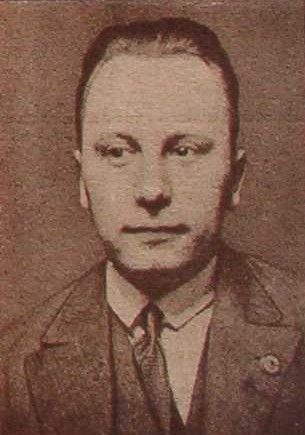
Josef Rejfíř

Josef Rejfiř (22 September 1909 – 4 May 1962) was one of Czechoslovakia's strongest chess players before World War II.

Rejfiř represented Czechoslovakia at all five Chess Olympiads from 1928 to 1935. He retired from chess for many years, but returned in the last decade of his life to play in the 1956 and 1958 Olympiads.

Rejfiř received the International Master title in 1956.

He died of a heart attack in Prague, the city of his birth.
