= Leonardas Abramavičius =

Lithuanian chess player

Leonardas Abramavičius (Russian: Леонард Абрамович; died 1960 in Kaunas) was a Lithuanian and Soviet chess player.

== Biography ==
Abramavičius played for Lithuania in four official and one unofficial Chess Olympiads.

- In July 1930, he played at fourth board at 3rd Chess Olympiad in Hamburg (+4 –11 =0).
- In July 1931, he played at fourth board at 4th Chess Olympiad in Prague (+3 –7 =1).
- In July 1933, he played at reserve board at 5th Chess Olympiad in Folkestone (+5 –2 =2).
- In August/September 1936, he played at fifth board at 3rd unofficial Chess Olympiad in Munich (+6 –8 =6).
- In July/August 1937, he played at reserve board at 7th Chess Olympiad in Stockholm (+2 –1 =0).

He won one individual silver medal in 1933.

Abramavičius played several times in Lithuanian Chess Championships. In July 1943, he tied for 1st-3rd with Birmanas and Romanas Arlauskas, (Abramavičius took 3rd in play-off), in Vilnius (12th LTU-ch). In 1947, he took 12th, in 1948 tied for 8-9th, in 1949 tied for 13-14th, in 1950 he won with Ratmir Kholmov, in 1951 tied for 14-15th, in 1954 tied for 5-6th, in 1955 tied for 6-7th, and in 1957 took 12th place.

== Notable chess games ==
- Leonardas Abramavičius vs Victor Kahn (FRA), Prague 1931, 4th Olympiad, Bogo-Indian, E11, 1-0
- Kornél Havasi (HUN) vs Leonardas Abramavičius, Folkestone 1933, 5th Olympiad, King's Indian, Fianchetto, E67, 0-1
- Gedeon Barcza (HUN) vs Leonardas Abramavičius, Munich 1936 (ol), King’s Indian, Sämich Variation, E85, 0-1
- Leonardas Abramavičius vs Vladas Mikenas, Vilnius 1955, LTU-ch, Ruy Lopez, Closed, C84, 1-0
