= Povilas Vaitonis =

Canadian chess player

Personal information
- Born: August 15, 1911 Ushpol, Kovno Governorate, Russian Empire
- Died: April 23, 1983 (aged 71) Hamilton, Ontario, Canada

Chess career
- Country: Canada
- Title: International Master

Povilas (Paul) Vaitonis (1911–1983) was a Lithuanian–Canadian chess master. He was a five-time Lithuanian champion and was twice Canadian champion. He also represented Lithuania and later Canada at Chess Olympiads.

== Chess career ==
Vaitonis played for Lithuania in one unofficial and four official Chess Olympiads:

- In July 1933, he played second board at the 5th Chess Olympiad in Folkestone (+5 –5 =2)
- In August 1935, he played fourth board at the 6th Chess Olympiad in Warsaw (+5 –5 =3)
- In August/September 1936, he played third board at the 3rd unofficial Chess Olympiad in Munich (+12 –6 =2)
- In July–August 1937, he played second board at the 7th Chess Olympiad in Stockholm (+8 –5 =5)
- In August–September 1939, he played second board at the 8th Chess Olympiad in Buenos Aires (+6 –8 =6)
- His Olympiad total for Lithuania was (+36 -29 =18).

Vaitonis played three matches against Vladas Mikėnas. In 1934, he lost a match (2–6). In 1937, he lost (4.5–5.5) and in 1938 he lost (3–9).

Vaitonis may have been the first player to use what is now called the Benko Gambit (1.d4 Nf6 2.c4 c5 3.d5 b5), in its most common move order, in a game against Einar Thorvaldsson at the 1936 Munich non-FIDE Olympiad.

Vaitonis was Lithuanian champion in 1934, 1937, 1938, 1942, and 1944. In July 1943, he took 4th place, behind Birmanas, Romanas Arlauskas, and Leonardas Abramavičius, at the 12th Lithuanian Championship in Vilnius. He left Lithuania just before the advancing Soviet forces to avoid deportation to Siberia or other persecutions of the occupying Soviet regime (e.g., Vladimirs Petrovs). In 1944–45, he joined the exodus of many other Baltic players – such as Arlauskas, Dreibergs, Endzelins, Jursevskis, Mednis, Ozols, Sarapu, Tautvaišas, Zemgalis – to the West.

In 1948, he came to Canada and settled in Hamilton, Ontario. He wrote a weekly chess column for the Hamilton Spectator from 1953–55.

In 1949, Vaitonis took 5th place at the Canadian championship at Arvida, Quebec. In 1951 he won the Canadian championship at Vancouver. In September–October 1952, he took 19th place at the 2nd Interzonal at Stockholm. In 1953, he took 3rd place at the Canadian championship at Winnipeg. He again won the Canadian championship in 1957 again in Vancouver; however, he declined the place at the 1958 Interzonal in Portorož this win afforded him and was replaced by the runner-up (Géza Füster).

Vaitonis played for Canada in two Olympiads:

- In September 1954, he played third board at the 11th Chess Olympiad in Amsterdam (+6 –3 =5)
- In September–October 1958, he played third board at the 13th Chess Olympiad in Munich (+4 –5 =5)
- His total for Canada in Olympiads was (+10 -8 =10)

He was awarded the International Master title in 1952.

In the 1960s, he continued to participate in Canadian championships and on teams (Lithuanian Chess Club, McMaster University).

Vaitonis was inducted posthumously into the Canadian Chess Hall of Fame in 2011.

== Notable games ==
- Povilas Vaitonis vs Erich Eliskases, Folkestone 1933, 5th Olympiad, English Opening, Anglo-Indian Defense, Queen's Knight Variation, A16, 1–0
- Octavio Trompowsky vs Povilas Vaitonis, Buenos Aires 1939, 8th Olympiad (f-A), Trompowsky Attack, A45, 0–1
- Paul Vaitonis vs Fedor Parfenovich Bohatirchuk, Vancouver 1951, Canadian Championship, Queen's Pawn Game, A41, 1–0
