= Karlis Ozols =

Australian-Latvian chess player

Karlis Aleksandrs Ozols (Latvian: Kārlis Aleksandrs Ozols; 9 August 1912, in Riga – 23 March 2001, in Australia) was a Latvian lieutenant in the Nazi-controlled Latvian Auxiliary Police and a member of Heinrich Himmler's SS during WW2. After later migrating to Australia, he was recommended to be charged under that country's War Crimes Act for helping oversee the mass-killings of Jews and anti-fascist insurgents in both Latvia and Belarus, but this was not pursued to prosecution. Ozols was also a champion Latvian-Australian chess player.

== Early life ==
Ozols was born in Riga in 1912. He studied law at university in that city from 1932 to 1938. His studies were interrupted by his joining the Latvian army as an officer in 1938. He became a lieutenant in 1940 and was able to complete his law degree the following year.

== Nazi career ==
With the Nazi Germany invasion of Latvia in 1941, Ozols volunteered to join the Nazi-controlled Latvian Auxiliary Police. This force, of which the infamous Arajs Kommando was part of, conducted widespread executions of Jews and other groups deemed undesirable by the Nazis in Latvia. By the end of 1941, most of Latvia's 70,000 Jews had been exterminated by this auxiliary police at places such as the Bikernieki forest. Ozols was accused of taking an active role in these war-time atrocities.

In early 1942, Ozols joined the Nazi Security Service and was sent to the specialist mass-killing training school at Fürstenberg which was associated with the Ravensbrück concentration camp. Ozols graduated in June 1942 with first class honours. In July, Ozols was deployed to Minsk in Nazi-controlled Belarus where he was made a member of Himmler's SS and given the rank of lieutenant in charge of the 1st company in the 4th battalion of the Latvian Security Service.

Ozols' battalion took part in the mass-killings of Jews and captured partisans sent to Minsk from Russia, other parts of Eastern Europe and also Western Europe. Throughout 1942 and 1943, Ozols actively assisted in the organisation of extermination sites such as Maly Trostenets near Minsk where up to 15,000 people were killed on a weekly basis. His unit was also involved in the burning of local villages and the liquidation of the Minsk ghetto.

On 20 July 1944 Ozols achieved the rank of Obersturmführer (First Lieutenant) and was awarded the Kriegsverdienstkreuz, 2nd class.

== Life in Australia ==
In spring 1945, Ozols fled Riga by sea just ahead of the advancing Soviet forces, landing in West Germany, and spent the next several years in various D.P. (Displaced Persons) camps across Germany. Under the Menzies government, Ozols was allowed to emigrate to Australia, arriving in Melbourne on board the migrant ship Mozzafari in 1949. He obtained Australian citizenship in 1956.

Together with other former Nazis of the Latvian SS who had escaped to Australia (such as Konrads Kalejs), Ozols helped form the Australian branch of the Latvian Relief Society. Otherwise known as the Daugavas Vanagi (Hawks of Daugava), this branch eventually consisted of around 1,200 members which gave support to keeping their fascist traditions alive.

Apart from becoming a state and national chess champion, Ozols together his wife Erika, lived an unassuming life. He was first named in war criminal investigations in 1963 and was the subject of an Australian government report into war crimes in 1986. The director of the National Crime Authority recommended charges of genocide against Ozols, however the case failed to proceed and was dropped in 1995 due to an apparent lack of funds to continue the investigation. In 2000, Latvian authorities wished to investigate the possible extradition of Ozols to Latvia for war crimes but this never eventuated due to Ozols's ill health and consequent death.

== Chess career ==
Ozols represented Latvia on eighth board (+7 −1 =7) in the unofficial Chess Olympiad, at Munich 1936, where he won the individual bronze medal. He also played on fourth board (+2 −5 =3) in the 7th Olympiad at Stockholm 1937.

In 1937, he tied for 17-18th in Ķemeri. The event was won by three players: Salo Flohr, Vladimirs Petrovs and Samuel Reshevsky. In 1939, he took 16th in Ķemeri-Riga (Flohr won). In 1941, he took 8th in Riga (1st Latvian SSR-ch, Alexandrs Koblencs won). In 1944, he won the Riga championship. Like other members of the Latvian SS, he played in a number of small international events while in Displaced Persons camps, including The Matisons Memorial Tourney in Hanau (near Frankfurt) in 1947, which was won by his fellow Latvian Lūcijs Endzelīns, ahead of Elmārs Zemgalis, Efim Bogoljubow and Hönlinger. Ozols was equal fifth.

After immigrating to Australia in 1949, Ozols won the Victorian Championship nine times. He jointly won the Australian Championship in 1956 and became an International Master of Correspondence Chess in 1972.

== Death ==
Ozols died in Melbourne on 26 March 2001. He is buried at the Latvian Lutheran Garden, Niche 12, in the Fawkner Memorial Park.
