= Edmar Mednis =

American chess grandmaster (1937–2002)

Personal information
- Born: Edmar John Mednis; March 22, 1937 Riga, Latvia
- Died: February 13, 2002 (aged 64) Queens, New York, U.S.

Chess career
- Country: United States
- Title: Grandmaster (1980)
- Peak rating: 2510 (January 1979)

Edmar John Mednis (Latvian: Edmārs Džons Mednis; March 22, 1937 – February 13, 2002) was an American chess player and writer of Latvian origin. FIDE awarded him the Grandmaster title in 1980.

== Biography ==
Mednis' family were refugees in 1944 during World War II. As displaced persons, Edmar and his two sisters, with parents Edvin and Marita Mednis, were permitted to emigrate to the United States in 1950. Mednis was trained as a chemical engineer, then worked as a stockbroker, but became best known as a chess author. He wrote 26 chess books, including Practical Rook Endings (1982) and Strategic Chess: Mastering the Closed Game (1993), and hundreds of chess articles. He and Robert Byrne annotated many games for Chess Informant.

Mednis finished second in the 1955 World Junior Championship behind Boris Spassky (the two drew their game). He was the first player to beat Bobby Fischer in a U.S. Championship. He played on the 1962 US team at the 15th Chess Olympiad and finished equal third in the 1961–62 U.S. Championship. Tournament results included third at Houston 1974, equal fourth at New York City 1980, and equal first at Puerto Rico 1984. The Puerto Rico Chess Federation, rather than the United States Chess Federation, formally proposed him for the Grandmaster title. He played in the 1979 Interzonal tournament in Riga, his birthplace, and finished equal 15th.

Mednis died of complications from pneumonia on February 13, 2002.

== Books ==
Mednis

- How to Beat Bobby Fischer (1974). New York Times. Revised edition (Dover, 1998). ISBN 0-486-29844-2. An annotated collection of all of Bobby Fischer's lost games.
- How Karpov Wins (1975).
- Practical Endgame Lessons (1978). McKay. ISBN 0-67913-072-1.
- Practical Rook Endings (1982). Chess Enterprises. ISBN 0-931462-16-9.
- From the Opening into the Endgame (1983). Pergamon Press.
- King Power In Chess (1986).
- Questions and Answers on Practical Endgame Play (1987). ISBN 0-931462-69-X.
- Practical Bishop Endings (1990). Chess Enterprises. ISBN 0-945470-04-5.
- Strategic Themes in Endgames (1991).
- Rate Your Endgame (1992). Co-author Colin Crouch. Cadogan. ISBN 978-1-85744-174-1.
- Strategic Chess: Mastering the Closed Game (1993). ISBN 0-486-40617-2.
- Advanced Endgame Strategies (1996). Chess Enterprises. ISBN 0-945470-59-2.
- Practical Endgame Tips (1998). Cadogan. ISBN 1-85744-213-X.
- The king in the Endgame (1997). Chess Enterprises. ISBN 0-945470-65-7.

== Notable games ==
- Here is Mednis's victory over Fischer:
  Fischer–Mednis, U.S. Championship 1962
  1.e4 e6 2.d4 d5 3.Nc3 Bb4 4.e5 c5 5.a3 Bxc3+ 6.bxc3 Qc7 7.Nf3 Bd7 8.a4 Ne7 9.Bd3 Nbc6 10.0-0 c4 11.Be2 f6 12.Ba3 0-0 13.Re1 Rf7 14.exf6 gxf6 15.Bf1 Re8 16.Nh4 Ng6 17.Qh5 Rg7 18.g3 Qa5 19.Bb2 Nd8 20.Re3 Nf7 21.Kh1 Nd6 22.Nxg6 hxg6 23.Qe2 Rh7 24.Kg1 Kf7 25.h4 f5 26.Qf3 Ne4 27.Qf4 Rc8 28.Bg2 Qc7 29.Qxc7 Rxc7 30.a5 Rc6 31.Ba3 Ra6 32.Bb4 Rh8 33.Ree1 Bc6 34.Bf3 Nd2 35.Be2 Ne4 36.Kg2 Nf6 37.Rh1 Be8 38.Kf3 Ne4 39.Ke3 Nf6 40.f3 Bd7 41.g4 Be8 42.Kf4 Bb5 43.h5 gxh5 44.Rag1 Be8 45.Ke3 b6 46.axb6 Rxb6 47.Ra1 Rb7 48.Bd6 Rh7 49.gxf5? (Mednis considered this the losing move, because it gave black a second passed pawn; he felt 49.g5 was better) exf5 50.Rh4 Ke6 51.Bh2 Rb2 52.Kd2 Rhb7 53.Kc1 R2b6 54.Bf1 Ng8 55.Bf4 a5 56.Rh2 a4 57.Bh3 Ne7 58.Bg5 Kf7 59.Re2 Re6 60.Rxe6 Kxe6 61.Kd1 Nc8 62.Kd2 Bd7 63.Bg2 Ra7 64.Re1+ Kd6 65.Bh6 a3 66.Bf8+ Kc6 67.Bc5 Ra8 68.Ra1 a2 69.Ke3 Nd6 70.Kf4 Nb5 71.Bb4 h4 72.Bh3 Nc7 73.Be7 0–1
- Here is a crushing win by Mednis over future World Champion candidate Jan Timman:
  Mednis–Timman, Sombor 1974
  1.e4 c5 2.Nf3 e6 3.d4 cxd4 4.Nxd4 Nf6 5.Nc3 d6 6.g4 Nc6 7.g5 Nd7 8.Be3 Nc5 9.Qd2 a6 10.0-0-0 Bd7 11.f4 b5 12.Bg2 b4 13.Nce2 Rb8 14.Kb1 Qc7 15.h4 a5 16.h5 a4 17.g6 b3 18.gxf7+ Kxf7 19.cxb3 axb3 20.a3 h6 21.Rhf1 Nxd4 22.Nxd4 Ke8 23.Qf2 Bc8 24.e5 Rb6 25.f5 Bb7 26.fxe6 dxe5 27.Qg3 Bxg2 28.Qg6+ Kd8 29.Nb5+ Rd6 30.Qxg2 1–0
