= Elmārs Zemgalis =

American chess grandmaster (1923–2014)

Personal information
- Born: September 9, 1923 Riga, Latvia
- Died: December 8, 2014 (aged 91) United States

Chess career
- Country: Latvia; United States
- Title: Grandmaster (2003)

Elmārs Zemgalis (9 September 1923 – 8 December 2014) was a Latvian and American chess master and mathematics professor at Highline College. He was awarded an Honorary Grandmaster title in 2003.

== Biography ==
Zemgalis started to play chess when he was eleven, eventually winning the championships of Riga and Jelgava. After the Soviet Union invaded his native Latvia for the second time in 1944, Zemgalis fled to Germany. As a Displaced Person after World War II, he played in twelve international tournaments. In 1946, he took second place, behind Wolfgang Unzicker, in Augsburg, with 13/16. In 1946, he took second place, behind Fedor Bohatirchuk, in Regensburg (Klaus Junge Memorial), with 6.5/9. In 1947, he took second place, behind Lūcijs Endzelīns in Hanau (Hermanis Matisons Memorial). In 1948, he won in Esslingen (Württemberg-ch), with 7/9. In 1949, he won in Rujtā (Württemberg-ch). In 1949, he tied for first place with Efim Bogoljubow in Oldenburg. In 1949, he tied for first place with Leonids Dreibergs in Esslingen.

In 1951, he emigrated to the United States, where he became a mathematics professor. By 1952, Zemgalis had settled in Seattle. He was arguably the top player in the Pacific Northwest for the next fifteen years. In 1952, he won (3:1) a match against Olaf Ulvestad in Seattle. In 1953 and 1959, he won the Washington state championships. His 9–0 win in the 1953 Championship and his 6–0 win in the 1959 Championship are the only perfect score in the history of the tournament. In 1962, he won (4.5: 3.5) a match against Viktors Pupols.

William John Donaldson wrote a book on his chess career: Elmars Zemgalis: Grandmaster without the title (2001). Zemgalis was awarded the Honorary Grandmaster title by FIDE in 2003.
