= Hermanis Matisons =

Latvian chess player (1894–1932)

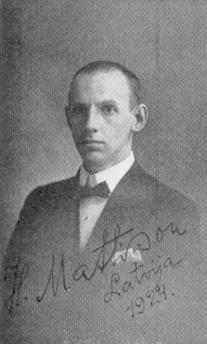

Hermanis Matisons (German: Herman Mattison; 1894, Riga – 1932) was a Latvian chess player and one of world's most highly regarded chess masters in the early 1930s. He was also a leading composer of endgame studies. He died of tuberculosis at the age of 37.

In 1924, Matisons won the first Latvian Chess Championship tournament. Later that year he finished ahead of Fricis Apšenieks, and Edgard Colle to win the first World Amateur Championship, which was organized in conjunction with the Paris Olympic Games, followed by Max Euwe in 1928. Matisons played first board for Latvia at the 1931 Chess Olympiad in Prague and defeated Akiba Rubinstein and Alexander Alekhine, then the reigning World Champion.

Sixty of Matisons' endgame studies were collected in the 1987 book Mattison's Chess Endgame Studies by T.G. Whitworth.
