= Vladimirs Petrovs =

Latvian-Russian chess player (1908–1943)

Personal information
- Born: Vladimir Mikhailovich Petrov; 27 September 1908 Riga, Governorate of Livonia, Russian Empire
- Died: 26 August 1943 (aged 35) Kotlas, Russian SFSR, Soviet Union

Chess career
- Country: Latvia; Soviet Union

Vladimirs Petrovs (Russian: Влади́мир Миха́йлович Петро́в, romanized: Vladimir Mikhailovich Petrov; 27 September 1908 – 26 August 1943) was a Latvian Russian chess player.

== Biography ==
He was born in Riga, in the Governorate of Livonia of the Russian Empire (present-day Latvia). Though he learned the game of chess relatively late, at age thirteen, Petrovs made rapid progress. By 1926, at age 19, he won the championship of Riga and finished third in the national championship. He placed 2nd–5th, behind Isakas Vistaneckis, in the first Baltic Championship at Klaipėda in 1931. Petrovs won a match with Movsas Feigins (+4 –1 =3) in 1931, won a match against Vladas Mikėnas (+2 –0 =1) in 1932, and narrowly lost a match to Rudolf Spielmann (+1 –2 =5) in 1934.

Petrovs tied for first with Fricis Apšenieks in 1934, and won the Latvian Championship in 1935 and 1937. He won at Helsinki in 1936, and tied for first with Samuel Reshevsky and Salo Flohr at Kemeri in 1937, ahead of Alexander Alekhine, Paul Keres, Endre Steiner, Savielly Tartakower, Reuben Fine, Gideon Ståhlberg and others. This was Petrovs’ finest tournament achievement. Later the same year, he finished last at Semmering. Petrovs placed 3rd-5th at Łódź in 1938, behind Vasja Pirc and Tartakower, and third at Margate in 1938, behind Alekhine and Rudolf Spielmann, defeating Alekhine in their individual game. In 1939, Petrovs placed 8th of 16 at Kemeri–Riga, and won at Rosario, ahead of Erich Eliskases and Mikėnas.

Petrovs played for Latvia in all seven official Chess Olympiads from 1928 to 1939. He also played at the unofficial Olympiad at Munich 1936.

- In July/August 1928, he played at third board at the 2nd Chess Olympiad in The Hague (+5 –4 =7).
- In July 1930, he played at second board at the 3rd Chess Olympiad in Hamburg (+8 –3 =6).
- In July 1931, he played at third board at the 4th Chess Olympiad in Prague (+9 –2 =5).
- In July 1933, he played at second board at the 5th Chess Olympiad in Folkestone (+6 –5 =3).
- In August 1935, he played at first board at the 6th Chess Olympiad in Warsaw (+7 –5 =7).
- In August–September 1936, he played at first board at the 3rd unofficial Chess Olympiad in Munich (+10 –3 =7).
- In July–August 1937, he played at first board at the 7th Chess Olympiad in Stockholm (+5 –3 =10).
- In August–September 1939, he played at first board at the 8th Chess Olympiad in Buenos Aires (+8 –0 =11).

He won two individual medals: gold in 1931 and bronze in 1939. He achieved a particularly brilliant result playing on top board at Buenos Aires: he was undefeated, drawing with world champion Alekhine, former world champion José Raúl Capablanca, and the young superstar Keres, and won against Vladas Mikėnas, Roberto Grau, Tartakower, and Moshe Czerniak.

In 1940 the Soviet Union annexed Latvia. Petrovs finished 10th out of 20 in the 1940 USSR Championship, taking equal third at Riga in 1941, and second in several strong tournaments: Moscow in 1941, behind Isaak Mazel; Moscow in 1942, behind Igor Bondarevsky, and Sverdlovsk in 1942, behind Viacheslav Ragozin.

When Nazi Germany invaded the Soviet Union on 22 June 1941, Petrovs was unable to return to his wife and daughter at home in Latvia. He remained in Russia and was arrested on 31 August 1942 under Article 58 for criticising decreased living standards in Latvia after the Soviet annexation of 1940. Petrovs was sentenced to ten years in a corrective labor camp. In 1947 his death was announced, but only in 1989 it became known that he had died at Kotlas in 1943 from pneumonia.

A rapid chess tournament, the Vladimir Petrov Memorial, was held in his memory in Jūrmala in 2012, 2013, 2014, 2015 and 2016.

== Notable games ==
- Vladimirs Petrovs vs Kazimierz Makarczyk, The Hague 1928, 2nd Olympiad, Queen's Gambit Declined, Orthodox, Rubinstein Attack, D64, 1-0
- Saviely Tartakower vs Vladimirs Petrovs, Hamburg 1930, 3rd Olympiad, Queen’s Pawn Game, A45, 0-1
- Karel Treybal vs Vladimirs Petrovs, Folkestone 1933, 5th Olympiad, Sicilian Defense, Classical Variation, B58, 0-1
- Vera Menchik vs Vladimirs Petrovs, Podebrady 1936, Czechoslovakia championship, Queen's Gambit Declined Slav, Exchange Variation, D13, 0-1
- Vladimirs Petrovs vs Reuben Fine, Kemeri 1937, Alekhine's Defense, B03, 1-0
- Gideon Stahlberg vs Vladimirs Petrovs, Łódź 1938, Nimzo-Indian Defense, Spielmann Variation, E22, 0-1
- Vladimirs Petrovs vs Alexander Alekhine, Margate 1938, Catalan, Open, E02, 1-0
- Vladimirs Petrovs vs Roberto Grau, Buenos Aires 1939, 8th Olympiad, Queen's Gambit Declined, D06, 1-0 Described as "An instructive and convincing game in its very simplicity"
- Vladimirs Petrovs vs Vladas Mikėnas, Rosario 1939, Catalan, Open, E02 1-0
- Vladimirs Petrovs vs Grigory Levenfish, Moscow 1940, 12th USSR ch, Old Indian, A53, 1-0
