= List of chess families =

This is a list of family relations among chess players, including siblings, parent–child relationships, married couples, and other family ties. It covers both male and female players across various nationalities and eras of competitive chess.

== Siblings ==
=== Brothers ===
- Espen Agdestein and Simen Agdestein
- Alexander Alekhine and Alexei Alekhine
- Dávid Bérczes and Csaba Bérczes
- Jacobo Bolbochán and Julio Bolbochán
- Olexandr Bortnyk and Mykola Bortnyk
- Donald Byrne and Robert Byrne
- Andrey Drygalov and Sergey Drygalov
- Hans Duhm, Dietrich Duhm and Andreas Duhm
- Arnold van Foreest and Dirk van Foreest
- Jorden van Foreest and Lucas van Foreest
- Daniel Fridman and Rafael Fridman
- Celso Golmayo Torriente and Manuel Golmayo Torriente
- Mirosław Grabarczyk and Bogdan Grabarczyk
- Karen Grigorian and Levon Grigorian
- Jozsef Horvath and Csaba Horváth
- Baadur Jobava and Beglar Jobava
- Paul Johner and Hans Johner
- Arvid Kubbel and Leonid Kubbel
- Emanuel Lasker and Berthold Lasker
- Gustave Lazard and Frédéric Lazard
- Kjetil Aleksander Lie and Espen Lie
- John Littlewood and Norman Littlewood
- Athanasios Mastrovasilis and Dimitrios Mastrovasilis
- Nelson Mariano II and Nelson Mariano III
- Yoav Milikow and Elie Milikow
- Iivo Nei and Mati Nei
- Vignesh N. R. and Visakh N. R.
- Nicholas Pert and Richard Pert
- Lajos Portisch and Ferenc Portisch
- Yuniesky Quesada Perez and Yasser Quesada Perez
- Alexander Romanovsky and Peter Romanovsky
- Kevin Spraggett and Grant Spraggett
- Endre Steiner and Lajos Steiner
- Rasmus Svane and Frederik Svane
- Artur Sygulski and Bogusław Sygulski
- Jan Timman and Ton Timman
- Bragi Thorfinnsson and Bjorn Thorfinnsson
- František Treybal and Karel Treybal
- Yuri Vovk and Andrey Vovk
- Andrey Zhigalko and Sergei Zhigalko

=== Sisters ===
- Sabina Francesca Foisor and Mihaela-Veronica Foisor
- Elvira Berend and Gulnar Sachs (née Sakhatova)
- Anita Gara and Ticia Gara
- Aleksandra Goryachkina and Oksana Goriachkina
- Vasanti Khadilkar, Jayshree Khadilkar and Rohini Khadilkar
- Nadezhda Kosintseva and Tatiana Kosintseva
- Alexandra Kosteniuk and Oxana Kosteniuk
- Alisa Marić and Mirjana Marić
- Vera Menchik and Olga Menchik
- Anna Muzychuk and Mariya Muzychuk
- Mai Narva and Triin Narva
- Gülümser Öney (née Yılmaz) and Gülsevil Yılmaz
- Živilė Šarakauskienė (née Čiukšytė) and Dagnė Čiukšytė
- Vilma Paulauskienė and Renata Turauskienė (née Domkutė)
- Susan Polgar, Sofia Polgar and Judit Polgár
- Gulrukhbegim Tokhirjonova, Nafisa Muminova, and Hulkar Tohirjonova
- Benita Vēja (née Vilerte) and Tamāra Vilerte
- Shrook Wafa and Shahenda Wafa
- Hanna Zboroń and Joanna Sadkiewicz (née Jagodzińska)
- Alexandra Botez and Andrea Botez

=== Brother and sister ===
- Zhansaya Abdumalik and Sanzhar Ashirov
- Jorge Cori and Deysi Cori
- Fidel Corrales Jimenez and Zenia Corrales Jiménez
- Dan Cramling and Pia Cramling
- Paweł Czarnota and Dorota Kika
- Przemysław Ereński and Hanna Ereńska-Barlo
- Adam Hunt and Harriet Hunt
- Shahriyar Mammadyarov, Zeinab Mamedyarova and Turkan Mamedyarova
- Nelson Mariano II and Cristine Rose Mariano
- Greg Shahade and Jennifer Shahade
- Levente Vajda and Szidonia Vajda
- Turhan Yılmaz, Gülümser Öney and Gülsevil Yılmaz
- Stanisław Zawadzki and Jolanta Zawadzka
- Jorden van Foreest, Lucas van Foreest and Machteld van Foreest
- Jovanka Houska and Miroslav Houska
- Vaishali Rameshbabu and Praggnanandhaa Rameshbabu
- Marcin Szymański and Maria Mickiewicz
- Tomasz Warakomski and Anna Warakomska
- Nodirbek Yakubboev and Nilufar Yakubbaeva
- Nodirbek Abdusattorov and Bakhora Egamberdieva (née Abdusattorova)

== Parent and child ==
=== Father and son ===
- Peter Biyiasas and Theodore Biyiasas
- Vladimir Eljanov and Pavel Eljanov
- Celso Golmayo Zúpide and Celso Golmayo Torriente
- Sergiu-Henric Grünberg and Mihai-Lucian Grünberg
- Wolfgang Heidenfeld and Mark Heidenfeld
- Dmitry Kayumov and Sergey Kayumov
- Larry Kaufman and Raymond Kaufman
- Bogdan Lalic and Peter Lalic
- John Littlewood and Paul Littlewood
- Cecil Purdy and John Purdy
- Mike Shahade and Gregory Shahade
- Sam Sloan and Peter Aravena Sloan
- Vladimir Smirnov and Anton Smirnov
- Vasily Osipovich Smyslov and Vasily Smyslov
- Evgeny Sveshnikov and Vladimir Sveshnikov
- Milan Vidmar and Milan Vidmar Jr.
- Mikhail Yudovich and Mikhail Yudovich Jr.
- Viacheslav Zakhartsov and Vladimir Zakhartsov
- Anatoly Donchenko and Alexander Donchenko
- Tahir Vakhidov and Jahongir Vakhidov
- Fabian Fiorito and Joaquín Fiorito and Francisco Fiorito

=== Father and daughter ===
- Evgeny Agrest and Inna Agrest
- Sergey Belavenets and Liudmila Belavenets
- Ovidiu-Doru Foișor and Sabina Francesca Foisor
- Waldemar Jagodziński and Joanna Sadkiewicz and Hanna Zboroń
- Baruch Harold Wood and Peggy Clarke
- Thomas Pähtz and Elisabeth Pähtz
- Mike Shahade and Jennifer Shahade
- Sam Sloan and Julia Elizabeth Sloan
- Viacheslav Stjazhkin and Anna Styazhkina
- Yuri Goryachkin and Aleksandra Goryachkina
- Juan Manuel Bellón López and Anna Cramling Bellón
- Dragisa Blagojevic and Tijana Mandura

=== Mother and daughter ===
- Naira Agababean and Almira Skripchenko
- Svetlana Agrest and Inna Agrest
- Maria Albuleț and Marina Makropoulou
- Pia Cramling and Anna Cramling Bellón
- Cristina Adela Foișor and Sabina Francesca Foisor, Mihaela-Veronica Foisor
- Nonna Karakashyan and Narine Karakashian
- Regina Narva and Mai Narva, Triin Narva
- Olga Rubtsova and Elena Fatalibekova
- Olga Stjazhkina and Anna Styazhkina
- Lidija Blagojevic and Tijana Mandura
- Xu Yuanyuan and Lu Miaoyi

=== Mother and son ===
- Jovanka Velimirović and Dragoljub Velimirović
- Eva Repkova and Christopher Repka

== Grandfather and grandson ==
- Spencer Crakanthorp and John Purdy

== Husband and wife ==
- Evgeny Agrest and Svetlana Agrest
- Alexander Alekhine and Grace Alekhine
- Mohammed Al-Modiahki and Zhu Chen
- Keith Arkell and Susan Arkell
- Sergey Arkhipov and Natalia Alekhina
- Levon Aronian and Arianne Caoili
- Suat Atalık and Ekaterina Atalik
- Algirdas Bandza and Rasa Bandzienė
- Mateusz Bartel and Marta Bartel
- Robert Bellin and Jana Bellin
- Juan Manuel Bellón López and Pia Cramling
- István Bilek and Edit Bilek
- Peter Biyiasas and Ruth Haring
- Milko Bobotsov and Antonia Ivanova
- Igor Bondarevsky and Valentina Kozlovskaya
- Bu Xiangzhi and Huang Qian
- Graeme Buckley and Susan Arkell-Lalic
- Pascal Charbonneau and Irina Krush
- Egor Chukaev and Klavdiya Chukaeva
- William John Donaldson and Elena Donaldson-Akhmilovskaya
- Pavel Eljanov and Olena Dvoretska
- Lūcijs Endzelīns and Milda Lauberte
- Vladimir Feldman and Irina Berezina
- Alexandr Fier and Nino Maisuradze
- Bobby Fischer and Miyoko Watai
- Glenn Flear and Christine Flear
- Ovidiu-Doru Foișor and Cristina Adela Foișor
- Robert Fontaine and Kateryna Lahno
- Laurent Fressinet and Almira Skripchenko
- Daniel Fridman and Anna Zatonskih
- Grzegorz Gajewski and Joanna Majdan-Gajewska
- Valeriya Gansvind and Sergey Kalinitschew
- Petar Genov and Lyubka Genova
- Anish Giri and Sopiko Guramishvili
- Alexander Grischuk and Natalia Zhukova
- Boris Gulko and Anna Akhsharumova
- Aidyn Guseinov and Elmira Alieva
- Zoltan Gyimesi and Nóra Medvegy
- Hichem Hamdouchi and Adina-Maria Hamdouchi
- William Hartston and Jana Hartston
- Helgi Grétarsson and Lenka Ptáčníková
- Sergey Grigoriants and Petra Papp
- Gilberto Hernández Guerrero and Claudia Amura
- Miguel Illescas and Olga Alexandrova
- Alexander Ivanov and Esther Epstein
- Artur Jakubiec and Edyta Jakubiec
- Paweł Jaracz and Barbara Jaracz
- Sriram Jha and Subbaraman Vijayalakshmi
- Gawain Jones and Sue Maroroa
- Toms Kantans and Anna Kantane
- Sergey Karjakin and Kateryna Dolzhykova
- Sergey Kasparov and Tatiana Kasparova
- Andrei Kharlov and Elena Zaiatz
- Jānis Klovāns and Astra Klovāne
- Jānis Kļaviņš and Ilga Kļaviņa
- Oleg Korneev and Tatiana Kononenko
- Yona Kosashvili and Sofia Polgar
- Leonid Kritz and Nadezhda Kosintseva
- Erwin l'Ami and Alina l'Ami
- Bogdan Lalić and Susan Lalic
- Gary Lane and Nancy Lane
- Vladimir Lazarev and Anda Šafranska
- Christopher Lutz and Anke Lutz
- Igor Lysyj and Olga Girya
- Marat Makarov and Julia Demina
- Vadim Malakhatko and Anna Zozulia
- Vidmantas Mališauskas and Marina Mališauskienė
- Rauf Mamedov and Nataliya Buksa
- Robert Markuš and Ana Srebrnič
- Viesturs Meijers and Agnese Meijere
- Reginald Pryce Michell and Edith Michell
- Igor Miladinović and Anna-Maria Botsari
- Tony Miles and Jana Miles
- Sergei Movsesian and Julia Movsesian (formerly with Petra Krupková)
- Martin Mrva and Alena Mrvová
- Arkadij Naiditsch and Yuliya Shvayger
- Hikaru Nakamura and Atousa Pourkashiyan
- Jaan Narva and Regina Narva
- Nguyễn Ngọc Trường Sơn and Phạm Lê Thảo Nguyên
- Peter Heine Nielsen and Viktorija Čmilytė
- Srećko Nedeljković and Verica Nedeljković
- John Nunn and Petra Fink
- Suat Rıza Öney and Gülümser Öney
- Arman Pashikian and Maria Kursova
- Peng Xiaomin and Qin Kanying
- Jovan Petronic and Sanja Petronic
- Vasik Rajlich and Iweta Rajlich
- Ramachandran Ramesh and Aarthie Ramaswamy
- Igors Rausis and Olita Rause
- Zoltán Ribli and Maria Grosch
- Maxim Rodshtein and Tereza Olsarova
- Ian Rogers and Cathy Rogers
- Vidrik Rootare and Salme Rootare
- Gennadij Sagalchik and Olga Sagalchik
- Bjarke Sahl and Sheila Barth Berntsen
- Gediminas Sarakauskas and Zivile Sarakauskiene
- Yasser Seirawan and Yvette Nagel
- Miron Sher and Alla Grinfeld
- Alexei Shirov and Viktorija Čmilytė
- Alexei Shirov and Olga Dolgova
- Alexei Shirov and Anastasia Travkina
- Yuri Shulman and Viktorija Ni
- Luca Shytaj and Elisabeth Pähtz
- Bartosz Soćko and Monika Soćko
- Alexey Suetin and Kira Zvorykina
- Praveen Thipsay and Bhagyashree Thipsay
- Pavel Tregubov and Alexandra Kosteniuk
- Paul Truong and Susan Polgar
- Maxim Turov and Irina Slavina Turova
- Dennis Wagner and Dinara Wagner
- Radosław Wojtaszek and Alina Kashlinskaya
- Wu Shaobin and Xie Jun
- Wu Xibin and Lou Hongyu
- Alex Yermolinsky and Camilla Baginskaite
- Stanisław Zawadzki and Beata Zawadzka
- Zhang Zhong and Li Ruofan
- Georg Meier and Inna Agrest
- Alexander Grischuk and Kateryna Lagno
- Matthieu Cornette and Deimante Daulyte-Cornette
- Jan Werle and Iozefina Paulet
- Nijat Abasov and Khayala Abdulla
- Misratdin Iskandarov and Narmin Kazimova
- Twan Burg and Nargiz Umudova
- Dragisa Blagojevic and Lidija Blagojevic
- Richárd Rapport and Jovana Rapport
- Lei Tingjie and Raymond Song

== See also ==
- List of professional sports families
- List of family relations in American football
  - List of second-generation National Football League players
- List of association football (soccer) families
  - List of African association football families
  - List of European association football families
    - List of English association football families
    - List of former Yugoslavia association football families
    - List of Scottish football families
    - List of Spanish association football families
  - Category:Association football families
- List of Australian rules football families
- List of second-generation Major League Baseball players
- List of second-generation National Basketball Association players
- List of boxing families
- List of International cricket families
- List of family relations in the National Hockey League
- List of family relations in rugby league
- List of international rugby union families
- List of professional wrestling families
