= Viktor Gavrikov =

Lithuanian-Swiss chess grandmaster (1957–2016)

Personal information
- Born: Viktor Nikolaevich Gavrikov; 29 July 1957 Criuleni, Moldavian SSR, Soviet Union
- Died: 27 April 2016 (aged 58) Burgas, Bulgaria

Chess career
- Country: Soviet Union (until 1991); Switzerland (1992–1997); Lithuania (after 1998)
- Title: Grandmaster (1984)
- Peak rating: 2605 (July 1995)
- Peak ranking: No. 19 (July 1985)

Viktor Nikolaevich Gavrikov (Russian: Виктор Николаевич Гавриков; 29 July 1957 – 27 April 2016) was a Lithuanian-Swiss chess player. He was awarded the title of Grandmaster by FIDE in 1984.

Gavrikov shared first place with Gintautas Piešina in the 1978 Lithuanian Championship in Vilnius. In 1983 he won the under-26 Soviet championship. Two years later he jointly won the 52nd Soviet Championship with Mikhail Gurevich and Alexander Chernin in Riga, and tied for second place in the 1986 event, won by Vitaly Tseshkovsky. In 1988, Gavrikov tied for first place with Anatoly Karpov in the World Active Championship, held in Mazatlán, Mexico, finishing second on tiebreak.

After the collapse of the Soviet Union, he emigrated to Switzerland. He won the Grandmaster Tournament of the Biel Chess Festival in 1994, and the Swiss Championship at Arosa in 1996. He tied for first with Viktorija Čmilytė, Darius Ruzele, Aloyzas Kveinys, Vaidas Sakalauskas and Vytautas Slapikas in the Lithuanian Championship of 2000, taking third place on countback.

Gavrikov spent the last years of his life in Bulgaria, where he moved to in 2010.
