= Lithuanian Sports Club Makabi =

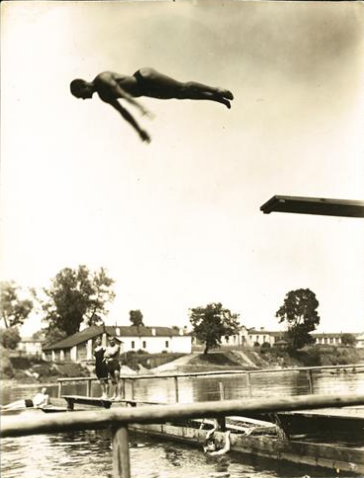
A man diving into the new swimming pool at the Maccabi Sports Club, Vilnius, 1930s

The Lithuanian Sports Club Maccabi is a sports club of the Jewish minority in Lithuania. It is one of the many Maccabi sports clubs worldwide. It was originally established on September 19, 1920 in Kaunas. It ceased to exist during the Holocaust in Lithuania and was reestablished only in 1989 during the perestroika in the Lithuanian SSR. The club participates in the Maccabiah Games. It had about 500 members in 1990 and 200 in 2000. As of 2014, the club supported nine sports (football, chess, basketball, table tennis, tennis, swimming, badminton, wrestling, shooting, and rhythmic gymnastics).

== Interwar period ==
In 1926, the club had 83 sections that united some 4,000 members. The best results were achieved by the footballers (Makabi Kaunas played 12 seasons in the A Lyga and won 3rd place in 1926), bicyclists (Isakas Anolikas represented Lithuania in the 1924 and 1928 Summer Olympics, was Lithuanian champion), boxers (several members became Lithuanian champions), chess players (Aleksandras Machtas and Isakas Vistaneckis represented Lithuania at Chess Olympiads), and table tennis players (brought the sport to Lithuania; Ona Gurvičaitė became champion at the 1933 World Maccabiah Championship in Prague). In total, the club supported 21 different teams. It participated in the 1932 and 1935 Maccabiah Games

== Post-Soviet period ==
Less than a month after reestablishment of the National Olympic Committee of Lithuania, Makabi club was reestablished on January 8, 1989 (chairman Semionas Finkelšteinas) with sections in Kaunas, Šiauliai, and Klaipėda. It retained its historical spelling Makabi as a sign of respect to the Lithuanian language. It sent a 25-member delegation to the 1989 Maccabiah Games where they competed not under the Soviet flag, but under the Lithuanian flag. At the games, wrestler Grigorijus Chažineris won silver, chess-master Eduardas Rozentalis won bronze, and the futsal team took the 5th place. The club established its own football team, Makabi Vilnius, which won in its zone of 2 Lyga in 1991 and placed 6th in the A Lyga 1991–92 season. It also won the Lithuanian Football Cup in 1992 upsetting champions FK Žalgiris Vilnius. The next season it became known as FK Neris Vilnius.

As of 2014, the club participated in 7 Maccabiah Games and 5 European Maccabi Games and won 11 gold, 20 silver and 14 bronze medals. This includes 2 golds and 3 silvers by the futsal team; 2 golds, 7 silvers, 3 bronzes by swimmer Ela Pavinskienė; and 4 golds, 1 silver, and 2 bronzes by swimmer Andrej Fadejev at the 2011 European Maccabi Games in Vienna.
