= Čiukšytė =

- Lithuanian surname
- m.: Čiukšys
- f.: (unmarried): Čiukšytė
- f.: (married): Čiukšienė
- Origin: čiukšė́ti, čiūkši, čiūkšti, "to chatter", "to make a shuffling noise"
- Related names: Čiukša, Čukšys, Čiukšius

Čiukšytė is a female Lithuanian surname, its male counterpart is Čiukšys. Notable people with the surname include:

- Aldona Čiukšytė (born 1944), Lithuanian rower
- Dagnė Čiukšytė (born 1977), Lithuanian chess player
- Živilė Čiukšytė, maiden name of Živilė Šarakauskienė (born 1978), Lithuanian-English chess player
