= Česnauskis =

Česnauskis is a Lithuanian surname. It is a variant of Polish surname Czesnowski. and may refer to:

- Antanas Algimantas Česnauskis (1936–2008), Lithuanian chess master
- Deividas Česnauskis (born 1981), Lithuanian footballer
- Edgaras Česnauskis (born 1984), Lithuanian footballer
