= Ieva Grumadienė =

Lithuanian chess player (born 1992)

Personal information
- Born: 1992 (age 33–34) Plungė, Lithuania

Chess career
- Country: Lithuania

Ieva Grumadienė (née Žalimaitė, born 1992) is a Lithuanian chess player. She was the winner of Lithuanian Women's Chess Championship (2018).

== Biography ==
Ieva Grumadienė is a graduate of the Faculty of Economics and Management of Vytautas Magnus University Agriculture Academy.

Her first chess trainer was Vitalius Vladas Andriušaitis. Later she studied chess under the guidance of FIDE Master Sigitas Kalvaitis.

In 2018 she shared 1st-2nd places in Lithuanian Women's Chess Championship with Daiva Batytė but won the title by additional indicators.

Grumadienė was a winner of the Lithuanian Youth Chess Championships in 2006, 2008, 2009, 2010 (in different girl's age categories), silver medalist of the Lithuanian youth championship in 2007 (in the category under 18).

She played for Lithuania in the World Youth Chess Championships (2002, 2004, 2006, 2007 and 2010) and European Youth Chess Championships (2008, 2009).

Grumadienė played for the team of the chess club "Bokštas". In recent years, she rarely participates in chess tournaments organised by FIDE.
