= Simona Limontaitė =

Lithuanian chess player (born 1987)

Personal information
- Born: 22 August 1987 (age 38) Telšiai, Lithuania

Chess career
- Country: Lithuania
- Title: Woman International Master (2008)
- Peak rating: 2243 (December 2017)

Simona Limontaitė (married name Kiseleva, born 22 August 1987) is a Lithuanian chess player who holds the title of Woman International Master (WIM, 2008). She is three time winner of Lithuanian Women's Chess Championship (2005, 2017, 2024).

== Biography ==
Her first chess trainer was Vytautas Gembutas. From 2006 International Master Vaidas Sakalauskas is her trainer. Simona Limontaitė is winner of the Lithuanian Girl's Championship (U18) in 2005.

Simona Limontaitė is multiple medalist of the Lithuanian Women's Chess Championships, in which she won three gold (2005, 2017, 2024) and two bronze (2003, 2009) medals.

Simona Limontaitė participated in several World Youth Chess Championships and European Youth Chess Championships in different age categories. Also Simona Limontaitė participated World Girls U-20 Championship in 2007.

She is participant of European Individual Women's Chess Championship in 2009.

Simona Limontaitė played for Lithuania in the Women's Chess Olympiads:

- In 2008, at third board in the 38th Chess Olympiad (women) in Dresden (+3, =2, -4),
- In 2010, at second board in the 39th Chess Olympiad (women) in Khanty-Mansiysk (+5, =3, -2).

Simona Limontaitė played for Lithuania in the European Women's Team Chess Championship:

- In 2005, at third board in the 6th European Team Chess Championship (women) in Gothenburg (+2, =1, -6).

She played for the Lithuanian chess clubs Telšiai (until 2006) and Vilniaus fortas. With chess club Panevėžys Chess Club Simona Limontaitė participated in European Chess Club Cup in 2008.

She is a graduate of the Vilnius Gediminas Technical University.

Her elder brother Martynas Limontas (born 1984) is chess FIDE master (FM) and Grandmaster for solving chess problems.

She was married, performed under the name of her husband (including in the victorious national championship in 2017). Since 2019, she has been performing again under her maiden name.
