= Algimantas Butnorius =

Lithuanian chess grandmaster (1946–2017)

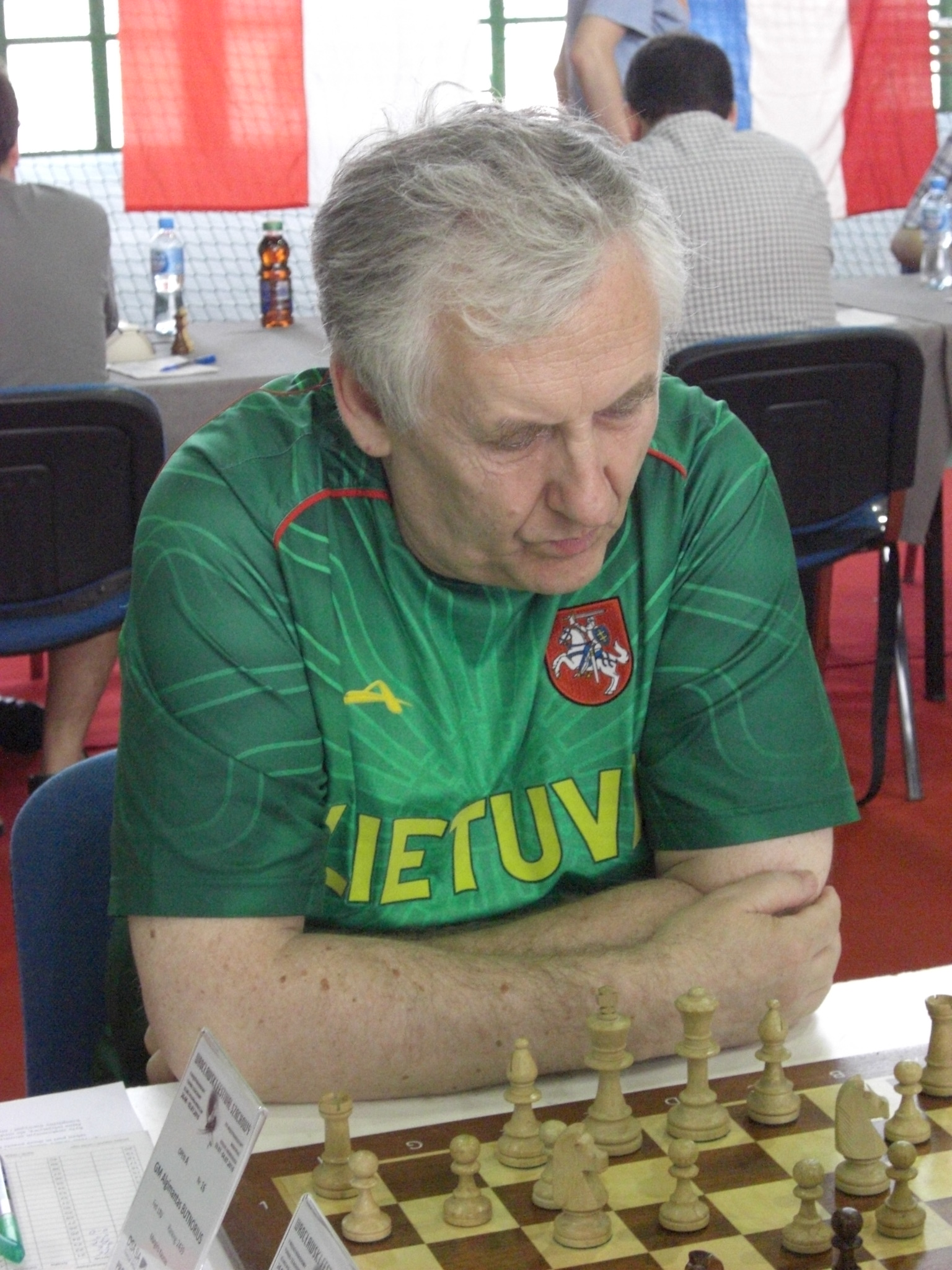
- Butnorius in 2010

Personal information
- Born: 20 February 1946 Kaunas, Lithuania
- Died: 30 October 2017 (aged 71) Kaunas, Lithuania

Chess career
- Country: Lithuania (until 2014); Monaco (from 2014)
- Title: Grandmaster (2007); International Correspondence Chess Master (2012)
- Peak rating: 2456 (July 1999)

Algimantas Butnorius (20 February 1946 – 30 October 2017) was a Lithuanian chess grandmaster and world seniors champion in 2007. From 2014 he represented Monaco.

== Chess career ==
Butnorius won the Lithuanian Chess Championship on ten occasions: in 1967, 1968 (shared with Vladas Mikėnas), 1970, 1972 (shared with Gintautas Piešina), 1973 (shared with Jegor Čiukajevas), 1975, 1976, 1980, 1982 and 1993. In team chess, he represented Lithuania at the Chess Olympiads of 2000, 2004, 2006 and in the European Team Chess Championships of 1999 and 2003. He won the World Senior Chess Championship in 2007. In 2010, he tied for 2nd–4th with Vitaly Tseshkovsky and Nikolai Pushkov in the European Seniors' Rapid Championship.

Butnorius was awarded the International Master title in 1983 and the Grandmaster title in 2007, as a result of winning the World Senior Chess Championship.

Butnorius studied journalism at Vilnius University, graduating in 1973. In 1975–1989, he hosted a chess program on LRT televizija. He also contributed chess-related articles and chess problems to Jaunimo Gretos, Kauno Tiesa, Komunizmo Vėliava, Lietuvos Aidas, Kauno Diena, and Vakarinis Kaunas.

== Notable games ==
- Viktor Kupreichik vs Algimantas Butnorius, Vitebsk 1970, Italian Game: Two Knights Defense, Traxler Counterattack (C57), 1/2-1/2
- Lajos Portisch vs Algimantas Butnorius, Leningrad 1969, Indian Game: West Indian Defense (E61), 0-1
- Algimantas Butnorius vs Garry Kasparov, Baku 1978, Neo-Grünfeld Defence: Classical Variation (D78), 1/2-1/2
- Algimantas Butnorius vs Anatoly S Lutikov, URS-chT 1975, Philidor Defense: Exchange Variation (C41), 1-0
