= Domarkas =

- Lithuanian surname
- m.: Domarkas
- f.: (unmarried): Domarkaitė
- f.: (married): Domarkienė

Domarkas is a Lithuanian surname. Notable people with the surname include:

- Dominykas Domarkas (born April 24, 1992) is a Lithuanian professional basketball player
- Juozas Domarkas (born 28 July 1936) is a Lithuanian musician, music teacher and conductor, and a professor
- Laima Domarkaitė (born 1 April 1970) is a Lithuanian chess player
