= Šarakauskas =

- Lithuanian surname
- m.: Šarakauskas
- f.: (unmarried): Šarakauskaitė
- f.: (married): Šarakauskienė
- Related names: Russian: Шаpахoвский, Belarusian: Шаpахoўскi

Šarakauskas is a Lithuanian surname.

- Vytautas Šarakauskas, Lithuanian basketball player
- Živilė Šarakauskienė (born 1978), Lithuanian-English chess player
