= Tomas Laurušas =

Lithuanian chess grandmaster (born 1996)

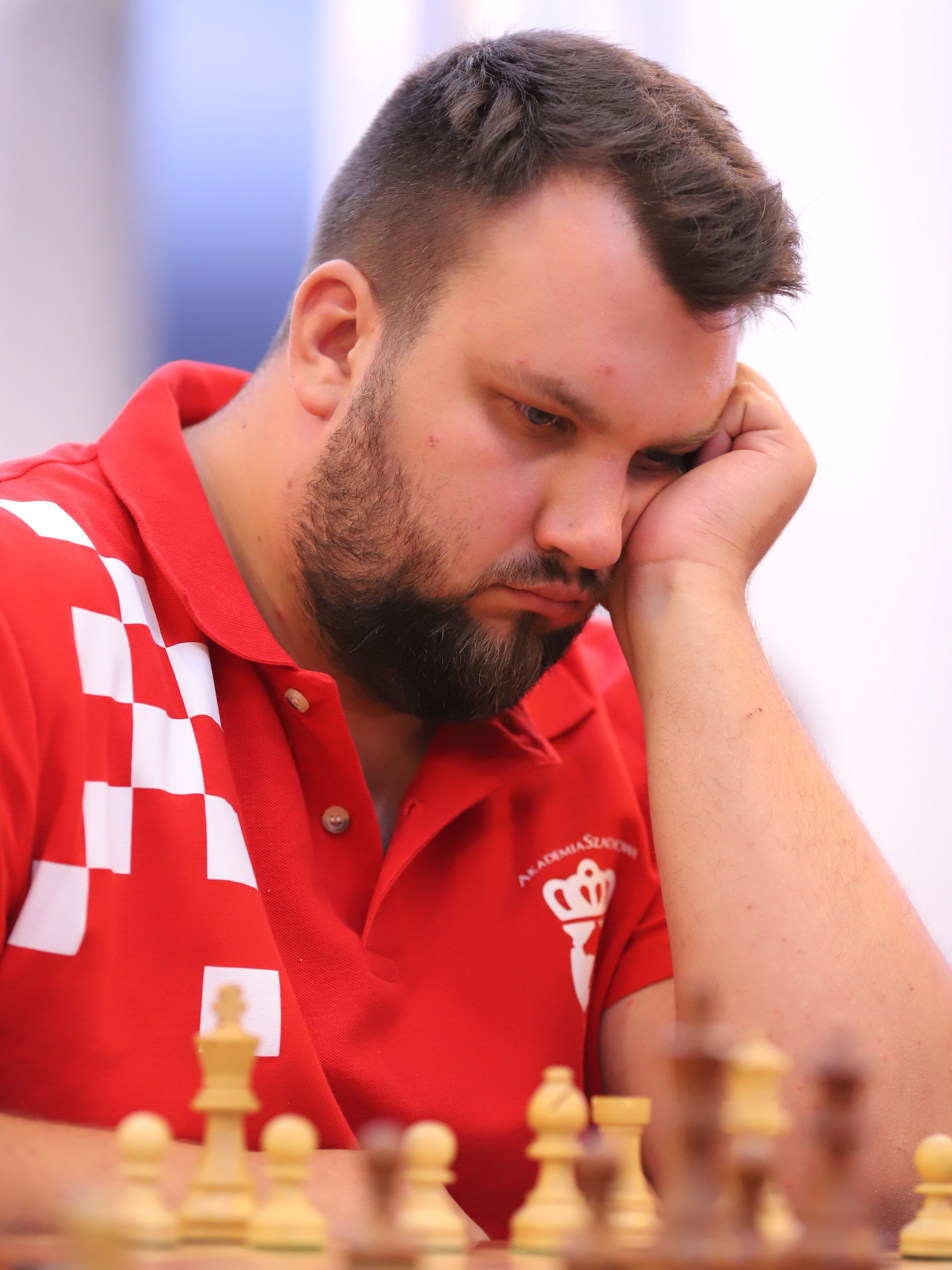
- Laurušas in 2022

Personal information
- Born: 13 February 1996 (age 30) Kaunas, Lithuania

Chess career
- Country: Lithuania
- Title: Grandmaster (2021)
- FIDE rating: 2511 (July 2026)
- Peak rating: 2590 (January 2024)

Tomas Laurušas (born 13 February 1996) is a Lithuanian chess player who holds the title of Grandmaster. He is the four time Lithuanian Chess Championship winner (2016, 2019, 2023, 2024).

== Biography ==
Laurušas successfully started at various European Youth Chess Championship. In 2008, he ranked second at the U-14 age group, but in 2012, he was third at the U-16 age group. In 2012 played for Lithuanian team in the World Youth (U-16) Chess Olympiad in Istanbul, where he won the individual silver medal at the first board. In 2014 he won bronze medal in the Lithuanian Chess Championship, but in 2016 Laurušas won the Lithuanian Chess Championship. In 2018, Laurušas won the blitz tournament in chess festival "Liepājas Rokāde". In 2019, he won Lithuanian Chess Championship.

In 2020, Laurušas tied for 2nd-5th place in the Panevezys International Chess Festival with Aleksandrs Jazdanovs, Bartlomiej Heberla, and Karolis Juksta. He won the 17th Klaipeda Sea Festival with a score of 6.5/7

In 2021, he won the Heldur Valgmae Memorial with a score of 8/9. In August 2021, he finished third in the Riga Technical University Open "A" tournament.

In 2023, in Kaunas he in third time won Lithuanian Chess Championship. In 2024, in Vilnius he in fourth time won Lithuanian Chess Championship. In August 2024, he finished third in the Riga Technical University Open "A" tournament.

Laurušas has played for Lithuania in 2 Chess Olympiads:

- In 2014, at third board in the 41st Chess Olympiad in Tromsø (+6 −3 =1);
- In 2016, at second board in the 42nd Chess Olympiad in Baku (+4 −1 =5).

He has also represented Lithuania in 2 European Team Chess Championships:

- In 2013, at fourth board in the 19th European Team Chess Championship in Warsaw (+3 −4 =2);
- In 2015, at second board in the 20th European Team Chess Championship in Reykjavík (+3 −2 =4).
