= Marina Mališauskienė =

Lithuanian chess player (born 1966)

Personal information
- Born: 22 August 1966 (age 59)

Chess career
- Country: Lithuania
- Peak rating: 2170 (July 1993)

Marina Mališauskienė (née Kurkul, born 22 August 1966) is a Lithuanian chess player. She is two times winner of the Lithuanian Women's Chess Championship (1985, 1993).

== Biography ==
Marina is a student of Vilniaus fortas chess school and her trainer was Lithuanian chess master Vaidas Sakalauskas.

From 1981 to 1995, she participated regularly at the Lithuanian Women's Chess Championships and won five medals: 2 gold (1985, 1993), 2 silver (1983, 1991) and bronze (1987). In 1986, she shared 3rd-4th places, but lost the bronze medal in additional coefficient.

From 1996 to 2010 Marina did not participate in high-level chess tournaments. In 2011, she again took part in the Lithuanian Women's Chess Championship, and began to actively participate in team chess tournaments.

She is the winner of the Lithuanian Women's Team Chess Championship in 2015 (played on the 3rd board) as a member of the Forto club team.
