= Lilija Benensonaitė =

Lithuanian chess player (born 1956)

Personal information
- Born: 1956 (age 69–70)

Chess career
- Country: Lithuania

Lilija Benensonaitė (also Liliya Benensonaitė; born 1956) is a Lithuanian chess player. She was the winner of Lithuanian Women's Chess Championship in 1973.

== Biography ==
In the beginning of 1970s Benensonaitė was one of the leading Lithuanian chess players. In 1968 in Kaluga she participated in USSR Girl's Chess Championship. In 1972 in Moscow she won an individual bronze medal in 12th USSR Team Chess Championship. From 1968 to 1973, she participated regularly at the Lithuanian Women's Chess Championships. She won two medals: gold (1973) and silver (1971). After winning the Lithuanian championship in 1973, she rarely participated in chess tournaments.

in 1978 she completed her studies in applied mathematics at the Faculty of Mathematics and Informatics of Vilnius University.
