= Lev Shevelev =

Lithuanian chess player (1938–1993)

Personal information
- Born: 10 January 1938 Leningrad, Russian SFSR, Soviet Union (now Saint Petersburg, Russia)
- Died: 20 May 1993 (aged 55) Palanga, Lithuania

Chess career
- Country: Soviet Union; Lithuania

Lev Shevelev (Russian: Лев Михайлович Шевелев; also Levas Ševeliovas; 10 January 1938 – 20 May 1993) was a Russian-born Lithuanian chess player who won Lithuanian Chess Championship (1979).

== Biography ==
Lev Shevelev was born on 10 January 1938 in Leningrad (now Saint Petersburg). His father, Mikhail Raisky, was repressed by the Soviet authorities, and his son Lev was given the surname of his mother, Serafima Sheveleva. His mother was a chemical engineer, worked in chemical plants, first in Leningrad, and in 1941 at the beginning of the war, evacuated with her son to Sverdlovsk (now Yekaterinburg). Lev Shevelev graduated from high school in 1955 in Sverdlovsk. In the same year he entered the Ural Polytechnic Institute, but did not finish it. In 1957 he entered the Leningrad Polytechnic Institute, but a year later he was dismissed for political reasons. From September 1958 to July 1961 he served in the Soviet Army. After completing his service, it was necessary to decide what to do next: his mother had died in 1957, he had no other relatives in Russia. In 1961 Lev Shevelev came to Klaipėda, entered the fishing fleet as a sailor. Later, he studied at a naval school, where he acquired a specialty in hydroacoustics, according to which he worked on ships. When his health deteriorated, he worked in the newspaper Lietuvos žvežos. In 1971, he led a chess section in the newspaper Tarybinė Klaipėda.

== Chess career ==
Lev Shevelev playing chess in Sverdlovsk. He first time play in Klaipėda city chess championship in 1965, where he took 3rd place. In 1972, after a break for 6 years, he took 3rd place again. Lev Shevelev won the Klaipėda city chess championship 6 times (1973, 1976, 1977, 1978, 1979, 1987). He played in the finals of the Lithuanian individual championships 5 times: 1973 (9th place), 1979 (1st place), 1980 (6th place), 1981 (6th place), 1984 (11th place). In 1979 Lev Shevelev was awarded the title of Master of Sport of the USSR. A multiple member of the Klaipėda city chess team in the Lithuanian team chess championships, where he won a gold medal in 1971, and silver medals in 1975 and 1982. In the Lithuanian highest league chess club team championships he won a gold medal in 1985.

A serious illness and death on 20 May 1993 ended the chess career of the talented chess player. He was buried in Palanga.

In 2010, a chess tournament for children was held in Klaipėda, dedicated to the memory of Lev Shevelev.
