= Gabija Šimkūnaitė =

Lithuanian chess player (born 2002)

Personal information
- Born: 7 December 2002 (age 23) Šiauliai, Lithuania

Chess career
- Country: Lithuania
- Title: Woman FIDE Master (2022)
- Peak rating: 2046 (April 2022)

Gabija Šimkūnaitė (born 7 December 2002) is a Lithuanian chess player. She won the Lithuanian Women's Chess Championship (2021, 2026).

== Biography ==
In 2018 Gabija Šimkūnaitė shared 2nd-4th places in Lithuanian Women's Chess Championship but remained in 4th place according to additional indicators. In 2021 she won Lithuanian Women's Chess Championship. In 2022 Gabija Šimkūnaitė ranked in 4th place in Lithuanian Women's Chess Championship. In 2023, in Panevėžys she won a silver medal in Lithuanian Women's Chess Championship. In 2025, in Vilnius she won a bronze medal in Lithuanian Women's Chess Championship. In 2026, in Klaipėda she won her second Lithuanian Women's Chess Championship.

Gabija Šimkūnaitė played for Lithuania in the Women's Chess Olympiads:

- In 2022, at reserve board in the 44th Chess Olympiad (women) in Chennai (+7, =1, -2).
- In 2024, at board 4 in the 45th Chess Olympiad (women) in Budapest (+2, =3, -2).

Gabija Šimkūnaitė played for Lithuania in the European Women's Team Chess Championships:

- In 2021, at third board in the 14th European Team Chess Championship (women) in Čatež ob Savi (+5, =1, -3).
