= Elena Lukauskienė =

Lithuanian chess player

Personal information
- Born: Elena Stankevičiūtė; January 1, 1909
- Died: March 17, 1959 (aged 50) Kaunas, Lithuanian SSR, Soviet Union

Chess career
- Country: Lithuania; Soviet Union

Elena Lukauskienė (1 January 1909 – 17 March 1959), née Stankevičiūtė, married Raclauskienė, also Raclauskienė-Lukauskienė, was a Lithuanian chess master. She was a two-time Lithuanian Women's Chess Champion (1938, 1949) and a participant at the Women's World Chess Championship (1939). For saving two Jewish children during the Holocaust in Lithuania, she was recognized as the Righteous Among the Nations in 2006.

== Chess career ==
From the late 1930s to the early 1950s she was known as one of the strongest chess players in Lithuania. She participated in the pre-war chess tournaments under the surname of her first husband. In 1938, she won the first Lithuanian Women's Chess Championship. In 1939 she participated in the Women's World Chess Championship in Buenos Aires and took 18th place (tournament was won by Vera Menchik). After World War II, she continued to participate in chess tournaments. In 1948, she represented the team of the Lithuanian SSR in the Soviet Team Chess Championship. In 1949, she won the second Lithuanian Women's Chess Championship. Then three years in a row she became the bronze medalist of this tournament (1950, 1951, 1952).

== Righteous Among the Nations ==
In spring 1944, she and her second husband Mikas Lukauskas (1911–1996) saved two Jewish children, Pesach and Khana Joselevich, ages nine and five. Before the war, their father Shimon Joselevich was the owner of the Spindulis printing house where Lukauskienė worked as a linotype machine operator. He died in the liquidation of the Kovno Ghetto, and their mother Leah Joselevich was imprisoned in the Stutthof concentration camp. At the end of the war, both children returned to their surviving mother. On 1 March 2006, Lukauskienė and her husband Mikas Lukauskas were recognized by Yad Vashem as two of the Righteous Among the Nations.
