= Rita Varnienė =

Lithuanian chess player

Personal information
- Born: 9 May 1973 (age 53) Vilkaviškis, Lithuania

Chess career
- Country: Lithuania
- FIDE rating: 2101 (May 2012)
- Peak rating: 2219 (July 2002)

Rita Varnienė (née Dambravaitė, born 9 May 1973) is a Lithuania chess player. She is a two-time winner of the Lithuanian Chess Championship (1991, 1999).

== Biography ==
Her first chess coach is Kęstutis Dambrava. In 1991 graduated from secondary school in Vilkaviškis and in 1995 graduated from Vytautas Magnus University (VDU) Faculty of Informatics. In Lithuanian Women's Chess Championship she has won 2 gold (1991, 1999), 3 silver (1990, 1992, 2000) and 2 bronze medals (1993, 2002).

Rita Varnienė played for Lithuania in Chess Olympiads:

- In 1992, at third board in the 30th Chess Olympiad in Manila (+1 −5 =2);
- In 2000, at second board in the 34th Chess Olympiad in Istanbul (+4 −4 =4);
- In 2002, at third board in the 35th Chess Olympiad in Bled (+4 −3 =3).

Rita Varnienė played for Lithuania in European Team Chess Championship (women):

- In 1999, at second board in 3rd European Team Chess Championship (women) in Batumi (+3 −3 =3).

Since 2007 participating in chess tournaments rarely.

== Sister ==
She has an older sister, Asta Dambravaitė (born 1971), who is also a chess player. In Lithuanian Women's Chess Championship Asta Dambravaite has won 3 bronze medals (1991, 1992, 1997) but in 1992 played for Lithuania in the 30th Chess Olympiad in Manila at first reserve board (+5 -2 =3).
