= Aleksandras Machtas =

Lithuanian chess player (1892–1973)

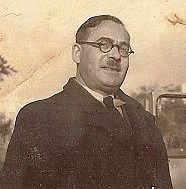
Portrait of Aleksandras Ziselis Machtas

Aleksandras Ziselis Machtas (Hebrew: אלכסנדר מאכט also Alexander-Zisel Macht, Sasha Maht; 6 October 1892 – 14 January 1973) was a Lithuanian chess master.

Machtas, a member of the Lithuanian Sports Club Makabi, won 7 chess championships in the first independent republic of Lithuania: in 1923–24, 1926–28, and again in 1931–32. That is more than any other Lithuanian chess player in the history of independent Lithuania. He took 7th place in the first Baltic Championship held in Klaipėda in 1931. The event was won by Isakas Vistaneckis.

Machtas twice played for Lithuania in Chess Olympiads: in 1930, at first board in the 3rd Chess Olympiad in Hamburg (+4 –9 =4) and in 1935, at second board in the 6th Chess Olympiad in Warsaw (+2 –7 =5). He became the first ever chess player to represent Lithuania as first board (top seeded) in a world chess Olympiad and to play in a formal match against a reigning world chess champion

Machtas served as the general manager of the largest Jewish bank in the first Republic of Lithuania "Centralinis Zydu Bankas" in Kaunas. In 1936, he emigrated with his family (son Yaacov Macht and others) to Palestine (then British Mandate). In British Palestine and later on in Israel, he founded and was the manager of the Industrial Bank in Tel Aviv.
