= Antanas Zapolskis =

Lithuanian chess player (born 1962)

Personal information
- Born: 20 April 1962 (age 64) Vilnius, Lithuania

Chess career
- Country: Lithuania
- Title: International Master (IM, 1992)
- Peak rating: 2420 (July 1992)

Antanas Zapolskis (born 20 April 1962) is a Lithuanian chess player who holds the titles of International Master (IM, 1992). He is two times winner of Lithuanian Chess Championship (1995, 1999).

== Biography ==
Antanas Zapolskis was a multiple participant of the Lithuanian Chess Championships, in which he won two gold medals (1995, 1999).

In 1995 in Riga he participated in World Chess Championship Baltic Zonal tournament.

In 1997 Antanas Zapolskis was winner of the Open Chess Tournament Heart of Finland (shared 1st-3rd places with Mikhail Rychagov and Aleksander Veingold). In 2005 he won International Chess Tournament Arcimpex Cup in Frýdek-Místek.

Antanas Zapolskis played for Lithuania in the European Team Chess Championships:

- In 1999, at second board in the 12th European Team Chess Championship in Batumi (+4, =1, -4),
- In 2003, at fourth board in the 14th European Team Chess Championship in Plovdiv (+1, =1, -6).

Antanas Zapolskis also two times played for Lithuanian chess clubs in European Chess Club Cups (1996, 2008).

In 1992 he was awarded the FIDE International Master (IM) title.
