= Darius Zagorskis =

Lithuanian chess grandmaster (born 1969)

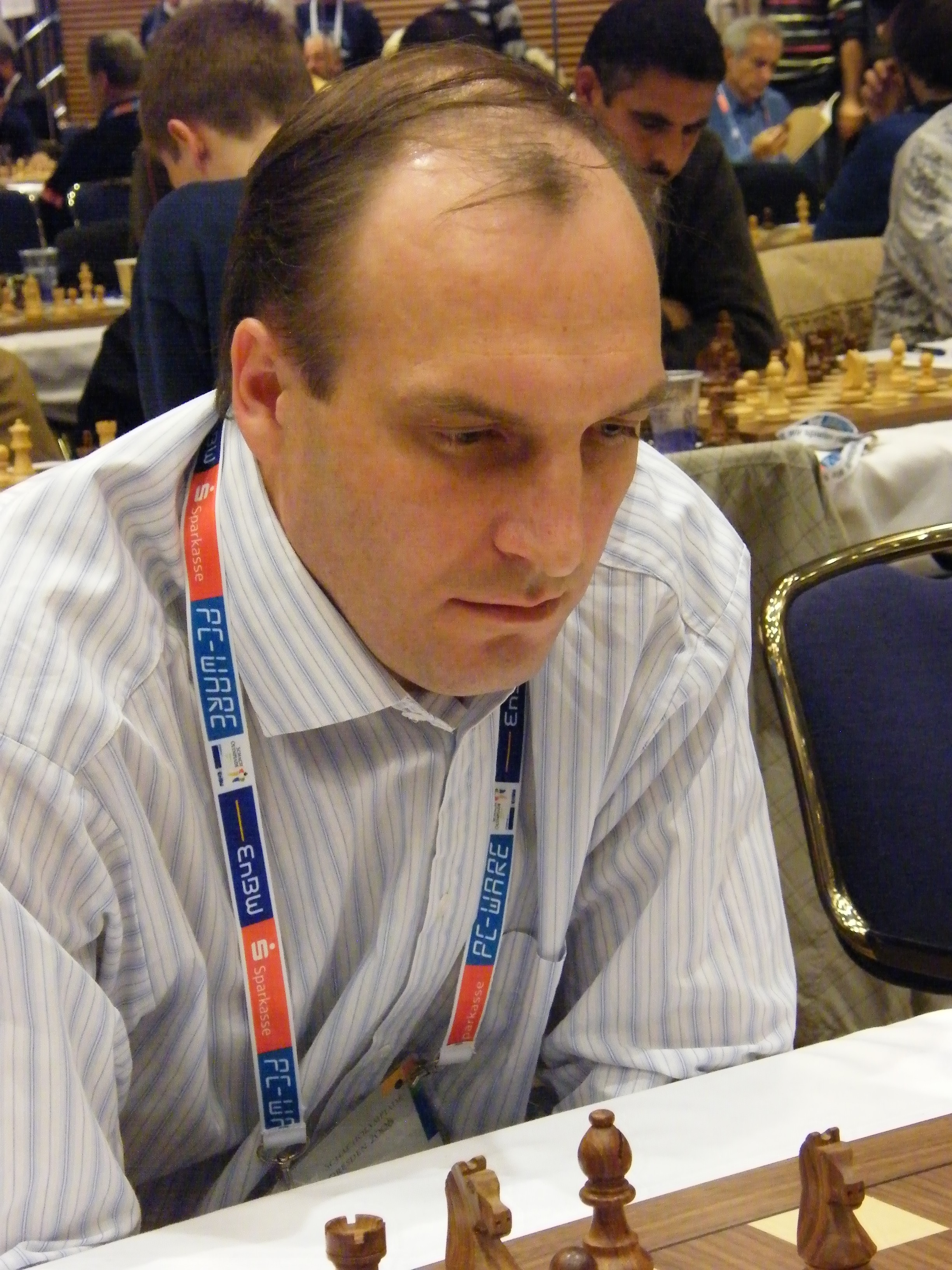
- Zagorskis in 2008

Personal information
- Born: 20 November 1969 (age 56) Vilnius, Lithuanian SSR, Soviet Union

Chess career
- Country: Soviet Union; Lithuania
- Title: Grandmaster (2013), Senior International Master (2007)
- Peak rating: 2550 (January 1995)

Darius Zagorskis (born 20 November 1969) is a Lithuanian chess Grandmaster (2013).

== Biography ==
Zagorskis learned to play chess and trained at the Chess School in Vilnius. In 1989 in Klaipėda gained the first serious success, taking 3rd place in the Lithuanian Chess Championship. In Lithuanian Chess Championships he has won 2 gold (2004, 2013), silver (1991) and 4 bronze (1989, 2002, 2006, 2007) medals.

FIDE awarded him International Master (IM, 1992) and Grandmaster (GM, 2013) titles. In 2005 Zagorskis won "Open" tournament in "Liepājas Rokāde".

Zagorskis successfully participated in Correspondence Chess tournaments. International Correspondence Chess Federation awarded him with International Correspondence Chess Master (IM, 2005) and Senior International Correspondence Chess Master (SIM, 2007) titles.

Darius Zagorskis played for Lithuania in Chess Olympiads:

- In 1996, at fourth board in the 32nd Chess Olympiad in Yerevan (+2 −1 =5);
- In 1998, at fourth board in the 33rd Chess Olympiad in Elista (+2 −3 =5);
- In 2002, at reserve board in the 35th Chess Olympiad in Bled (+4 −2 =3);
- In 2004, at fourth board in the 36th Chess Olympiad in Calvia (+2 −1 =7);
- In 2006, at reserve board in the 37th Chess Olympiad in Turin (+3 −2 =6);
- In 2008, at fourth board in the 38th Chess Olympiad in Dresden (+4 −2 =4);
- In 2010, at reserve board in the 39th Chess Olympiad in Khanty-Mansiysk (+5 −0 =4).

Darius Zagorskis played for Lithuania in European Team Chess Championships:

- In 1997, at third board in the 11th European Team Chess Championship in Pula (+1 −3 =5);
- In 2007, at reserve board in the 16th European Team Chess Championship in Heraklion (+3 −0 =1);
- In 2011, at second board in the 18th European Team Chess Championship in Porto Carras (+4 −3 =2);
- In 2013, at first board in the 19th European Team Chess Championship in Warsaw (+2 −3 =4).
