= Olena Martynkova =

Ukrainian-Lithuanian chess player (born 2000)

Personal information
- Born: 22 September 2000 (age 25) Kramatorsk, Ukraine

Chess career
- Country: Ukraine (until 2022); Lithuania (since 2022)
- Title: Woman International Master (2017)
- Peak rating: 2289 (June 2016)

Olena Martynkova (Ukrainian: Олена Олександрівна Мартинкова; born 22 September 2000) is a Ukrainian and Lithuanian (since 2022) chess player who holds the title of Woman International Master (WIM, 2017). She is two-times winner of Lithuanian Women's Chess Championship (2022, 2023). She is twice bronze medalist of Ukrainian Women's Chess Championship (2019, 2021).

== Biography ==
Olena Martynkova was one of the best young Ukrainian chess players. She won eight medals in Ukrainian Girl's Chess Championships: 4 gold (2010 - U10, 2016 - U16, 2017 - U18, 2018 - U18), 3 silver (2014 - U14, 2016 - U20, 2017 - U20) and bronze (2013 - U14). In 2012, she won European School Chess Championship in U13 age category. In 2016, Olena Martynkova together with Iulija Osmak, became the winner of the European Team Chess Championship (under 18 years), which was held in Slovenia.

Olena Martynkova five times participated in Ukrainian Women's Chess Championships finals and won two bronze medals: 2019 and 2021.

In 2022, after the Russian invasion of Ukraine, she moved to Lithuania and began to represent this country in chess tournaments.

In 2022 Olena Martynkova won Lithuanian Women's Chess Championship. In 2023, in Panevėžys she twice in row won Lithuanian Women's Chess Championship.

Olena Martynkova played for Lithuania in the Women's Chess Olympiad:

- In 2022, at first board in the 44th Chess Olympiad (women) in Chennai (+2, =7, -1).

In 2017, she was awarded the FIDE Women International Master (WIM) title.
