= Renata Turauskienė =

Lithuanian chess player (born 1969)

Personal information
- Born: 23 February 1969 (age 57) Šiauliai, Lithuania

Chess career
- Country: Lithuania
- Title: Woman International Master (2003)
- Peak rating: 2244 (January 2005)

Renata Turauskienė (née Domkutė, born 23 February 1969) is a Lithuanian chess player who holds the title of Woman International Master (WIM, 2003). She is two times winner of Lithuanian Women's Chess Championship (1988, 2001).

== Biography ==
From the late 1980s to the early 2000s, Renate was one of the strongest female chess players in Lithuania. She is multiple medalist of the Lithuanian Women's Chess Championships, in which she won twice (1988, 2001) and was runner-up three times (1989, 2002, 2003).

In 1989 Renate participated in the final of the USSR Women's Chess Championship in Volzhsky.

Renata Turauskienė played for Lithuania in the Women's Chess Olympiads:

- In 1992, at second board in the 30th Chess Olympiad (women) in Manila (+4, =2, -5),
- In 2002, at first board in the 35th Chess Olympiad (women) in Bled (+3, =5, -3).

Renata Turauskienė played for Lithuania in the European Women's Team Chess Championships:

- In 2003, at second board in the 5th European Team Chess Championship (women) in Plovdiv (+3, =3, -3).

Also Renata Turauskienė known as a chess trainer. She was the first coach of the International Master (IM) and Woman Grandmaster (WG) Deimantė Cornette and other Šiauliai chess players.

Her oldest sister is Lithuanian chess master Vilma Paulauskienė who won Lithuanian Women's Chess Championship in 1990.
