= Salomėja Zaksaitė =

Lithuanian chess player

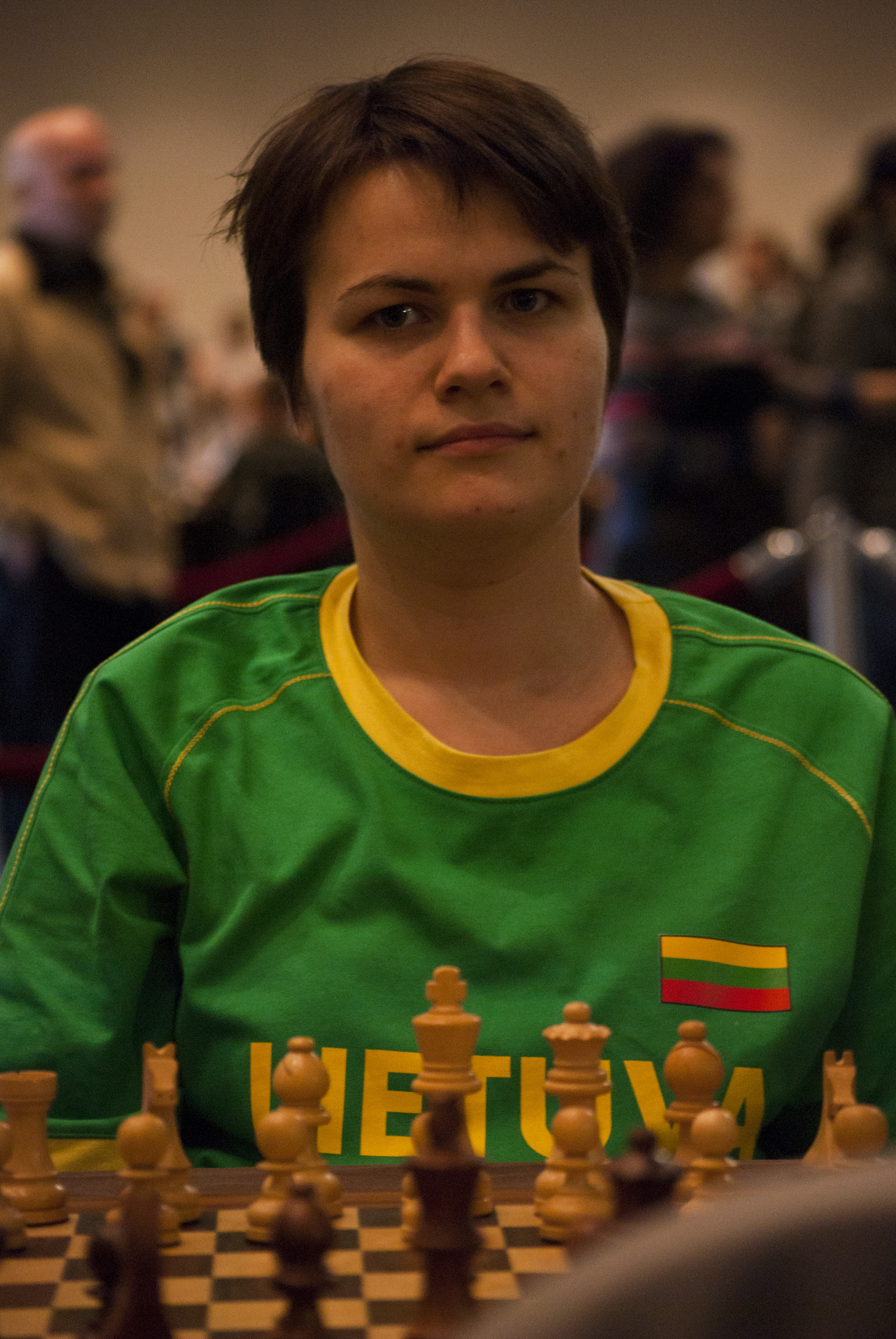

Personal information
- Born: 25 July 1985 (age 41) Kaunas, Soviet Union

Chess career
- Country: Lithuania
- Title: Woman Grandmaster (2023)
- Peak rating: 2336 (July 2016)

Salomėja Zaksaitė (born 25 July 1985 in Kaunas) is a Lithuanian chess player with the title of Woman Grandmaster (WGM), scholar of criminal law and criminologist. She was 2014, 2016 and 2025 Lithuanian Women's champion, 1999 and 2013 Lithuanian Women's vice-champion.

== Early years ==
In 2003, she was awarded the title of Woman International Master (WIM). The required norms she achieved in July 2002 at the Baltic Championship in Panevėžys woman with over-achieving, in August 2002 at a tournament in Birštonas, also with over-achieving, and in July 2003 at the Memorial in Świdnica (Poland). For the Lithuanian women's team, she played at the Chess Olympiad 2002, Chess Olympiad 2014 and at the European Team Championships in 2005, 2007, 2011 and 2013. The first required norm for the title of Woman Grandmaster (WGM) she achieved in January 2016 at the V Open Internacional Ciutat de Palma 2016 in Palma de Mallorca, Spain.

Her current and highest Elo rating is 2286 (March 2016). 2014 her rating was second to Viktorija Čmilytė at Lithuania's Elo ranking of women.

Her trainer was Gintautas Petraitis (b. 1944), ICCGM. Current trainer is Vaidas Sakalauskas (b. 1971), IM.

== Biography ==
From 1998 to 2003 she attended Kaunas University of Technology Gymnasium. After she graduated from her 2003 to 2008 program of master studies in law (with Specialization of Criminology), and then from 2008 to 2012, the doctoral program at the Law Faculty of Vilnius University. On 27 January 2012, she received a doctorate in criminal law and sports law on the "Cheating in Sports: Prevalence and Prevention Problems" (lit. "Sukčiavimo sporto srityje paplitimas ir prevencijos problemos") by Assoc. Prof. Dr. Anna Drakšienė.

From November 2006 to January 2008 Zaksaitė was as an assistant and from January 2008 to March 2009 as a chief specialist in the Juvenile law sector of Criminological research department of Law Institute of Lithuania. From March 2009 to March 2011 she was researcher in the Department of Legal system research and after in Department of Criminal justice of Law Institute. 2012 she was teacher at European Humanities University.

From April 2013 to March 2015 Zaksaitė was postdoctoral researcher at Mykolas Romeris University under the Project "Postdoctoral Fellowship Implementation in Lithuania". The project puts into effect the Measure for Enhancing Mobility of Scholars and Other Researchers under the Program of Human Resources Development Action Plan. Project Manager was the Research Council of Lithuania. Salomėja Zaksaitė analyzed legal issues of fraud situations in sports. Her supervisor was Assoc. Prof. Alfredas Kiškis.

Between 2020 and 2022, Zaksaitė led a project funded by the Research Council of Lithuania that examined the 1991 January Events. The study analyzed the responsibility of commanders, the individualization of punishments, the limits of criminal law, and public debate on the subject, drawing on Hannah Arendt's concept of the “banality of evil.” The material consisted of qualitative analysis of court cases, public discourse, and semi-structured interviews from the victims’ perspective. The results were published in international and Lithuanian scientific journals and presented at international conferences.

Zaksaitė is a Member of the Council of Lithuanian Association of Criminology.

Zaksaitė speaks English, Russian and German.

== Research interests ==
Zaksaitė's research interests is:

- Criminology (Crime prevention issues; Corruption issues; Deviation in sports)
- Criminalization and Decriminalization
- Sports law (esp. concerning doping and match-fixing)
- Juvenile justice.

== Awards ==
On January 27, 2012, awarded with an Acknowledgment by the Department of Physical Education and Sports under the Government of the Republic of Lithuania "For the Development of Sports Law".

== Monographs ==
- Vaiko minimalios priežiūros priemonės Lietuvoje: prielaidos, situacija ir įgyvendinimo problemos" (Authors: Laura Ūselė, dr. Salomėja Zaksaitė, Judita Žukauskaitė, dr. Tautvydas Žėkas). Law Institute of Lithuania. Vilnius, 2013
- Apgaulė sporto srityje: teisinis ir kriminologinis požiūris. 250 psl., Leidykla: Mykolas Romeris University, Vilnius. 2015
