= Maria Rivka Chwoles-Lichtenfeld =

Israeli chess player

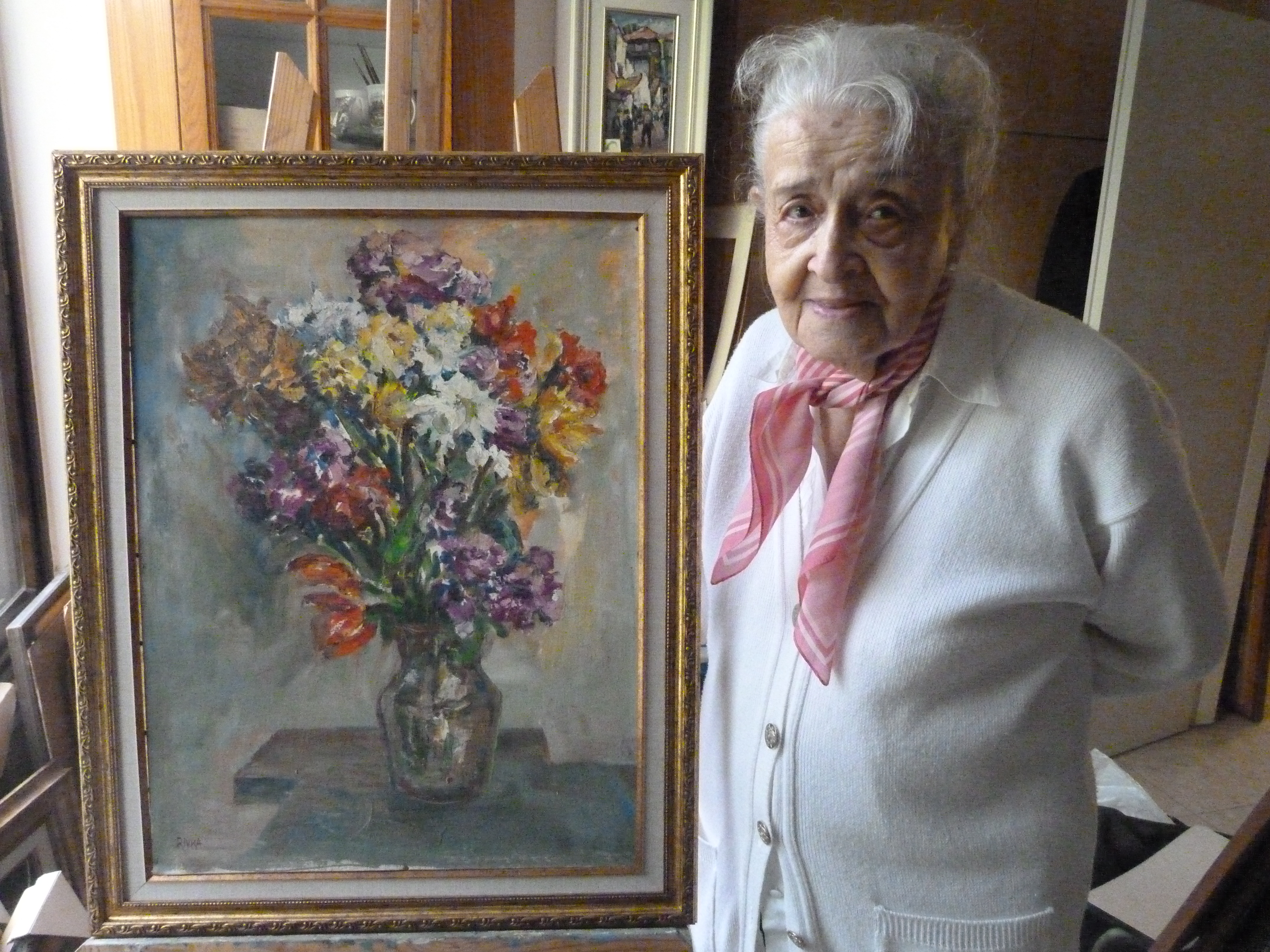
- Maria Rivka Chwoles-Lichtenfeld in 2016

Personal information
- Native name: רבקה חוואלס ליכטנפלד
- Born: 10 February 1923 Vilnius, Lithuania
- Died: 23 January 2017 (aged 93) Ashdod, Israel

Chess career
- Country: Poland; Lithuania; Israel

Maria Rivka Chwoles-Lichtenfeld (Hebrew: רבקה חוואלס ליכטנפלד; 10 February 1923 – 23 January 2017) was an Israeli artist and chess player who survived the Holocaust in her youth. She was a two times winner of Lithuanian Women's Chess Championship (1954, 1955) and winner Israeli Women's Chess Championship in 1957.

== Biography ==
She studied at the department of arts and crafts of the Vilnius Polytechnic School, simultaneously learning the basics of painting and playing the violin. After Vilnius was occupied by the Nazis on June 24, 1941, two Vilna Ghetto were established in the city on September 6, 1941; Rivka and her parents and sisters Elka (1921-1943) and Sofia ended up in the second of them. The sisters were able to escape from the ghetto, which was liquidated in mid-October 1943, and all its prisoners was murdered in Ponary massacre. For several weeks, the sisters hid in one of the city basements, and then met Lithuanian girls, sisters Nina and Lydia; when they went to the village of Gelyuny, seventy kilometers from Vilnius (now in Belarus), where their aunt lived at that time, they agreed to take Rivka with them, despite the mortal danger that threatened them for harboring a Jewish woman (In 1994, the Jerusalem Yad Vashem recognized Nina Balkene and Lydia Petrauskiene Righteous Among the Nations). In a few days, the girls reached the village on foot. Rivka was able to survive, introducing herself as Maria Voishvilovskaya, constantly wandering and changing her place of residence. Returning to Vilnius after the expulsion of the Nazis, she learned that her parents and three sisters, including Elka, had died.

After the war she continued her studies. At the same time, she successfully played chess. In 1951 and 1952 she became the vice-champion, and in 1954 and 1955 - champion of Lithuanian Women's Chess Championship; performed under the name Maria Lichtenfeld. In 1955, she participated in the semifinals of the USSR Women's Chess Championship, where she won 4th place. Also, in 1955 in Voroshilovgrad, she played for Lithuanian SSR in 4th Soviet Team Chess Championship.

In 1957 she emigrated to Poland, and from there (two and a half months later) to Israel. In the same year, she won the second Israeli Women's Chess Championship. Immediately settled in the city Ashdod. In 1969-1972 Studied at the High School of Painting in Tel Aviv. After the emigration of her brother Rafael Chwoles (1913-2002) from Poland to France in 1969, she resumed close contacts with him, repeatedly received him in Israel, and for four years, from 1973 to 1976, visited and worked for him in Paris. Rivka Chwoles-Lichtenfeld's style of painting, which was largely influenced by her older brother, is distinguished by its vivid expressiveness and, at the same time, subtle lyricism. Particularly successful are her landscapes, including seascapes, as well as still lifes, the central place in which is usually occupied by bouquets of flowers.

Upon her return to Israel, she taught drawing at schools in Ashdod, Holon and Bat Yam. In 1980, she participated in a group exhibition held at the Center for Yiddish Culture in Paris, which exhibited the work of leading artists and sculptors "School of Paris", including Marc Chagall Emmanuel Mane-Katz and others. Three of her solo exhibitions were held in the 1970s - 1980s in Paris, in 1994–2004. five of her exhibitions were held in Ashdod. When, in 1998, for the fiftieth anniversary of the State of Israel, the Ashdod Mayor's Office issued a holiday calendar that included twelve works by local artists, it opened with a reproduction of Rivka Chwoles-Lichtenfeld's painting "The Market in Ashdod." In 2007, she had a joint exhibition with her great-niece Ida Chwoles in Vilnius. In 2016, the Jerusalem Center for the Study and Development of Contemporary Art published a book about the Rivka Hvoles-Lichtenfeld. Died January 23, 2017.

== Literature ==
- Игорь Бердичевский. Шахматная еврейская энциклопедия. Москва: Русский шахматный дом, 2016 (Gad Berdichevsky. The Chess Jewish Encyclopedia. Moscow: Russian Chess House, 2016, p. 155) ISBN 978-5-94693-503-6
