= Nina Špikienė =

Lithuanian chess player

Personal information
- Born: unknown

Chess career
- Country: Lithuania

Nina Špikienė (née Konovalova; born 1940s) is a Lithuanian chess player and architect. She was two times winner of Lithuanian Women's Chess Championship (1959, 1960).

== Biography ==
She was an architect by profession. Among her projects designed were Hotel-Restaurant "Pajūris" (Basanavičiaus St. 9 / S. Daukanto St. 3), Palanga (1955-1959); in 1969 Expansion of the complex of the Lithuanian Academy of Agriculture (since 1996 Vytautas Magnus University Agriculture Academy): additional Faculties of Agrochemistry and Hydromelioration were designed (together with architects Viktorija Salvinija Jakučiūnienė and K. Zykum). Member of the Lithuanian Union of Architects.

From the end of 1950s to the end of 1960s, she was one of the leading Lithuanian chess players. She won six medals at the Lithuanian Women's Chess Championships: two gold (1959, 1960), silver (1969) and three bronze (1956, 1961, 1964).

She was married to Konstantinas Špikas and has a son. She lived in Kaunas.
