= Ilana Rozentalienė =

Lithuanian chess player (born 1937)

Personal information
- Born: 1937 (age 88–89)

Chess career
- Country: Lithuania

Ilana Rozentalienė (née Epšteinaitė; born 1937) was a Lithuanian chess player. She was two times winner of Lithuanian Women's Chess Championship (1962, 1965).

== Biography ==
Ilana's parents died in the Kovno Ghetto, in Vilijampolė, a suburb of the city of Kaunas. Julija Bernotaitė, a Lithuanian woman, put Ilana to sleep with drugs, smuggled her in a sack of potatoes from the ghetto to a village in Radviliškis District, and introduced her to everyone as her daughter. Later, Ilana lived in Vilnius. In the 1960s, she was one of the leading Lithuanian female chess players. She won four medals at the Lithuanian Women's Chess Championships: two gold (1962, 1965) and two bronze (1960, 1968). Her son is Eduardas Rozentalis (b. 1963), chess grandmaster. Her cousin is writer Dalija Epšteinaitė.

== Literature ==
- Игорь Бердичевский. Шахматная еврейская энциклопедия. Москва: Русский шахматный дом, 2016 (Gad Berdichevsky. The Chess Jewish Encyclopedia. Moscow: Russian Chess House, 2016, p. 210) ISBN 978-5-94693-503-6
