= Gintautas Piešina =

Lithuanian chess player (1952–2014)

Personal information
- Born: 8 April 1952 Šiauliai, Lithuania
- Died: 24 April 2014 (aged 62) Vilnius, Lithuania

Chess career
- Country: Lithuania
- Title: International Master (1988)
- Peak rating: 2430 (January 1989)

Gintautas Piešina (8 April 1952 – 24 April 2014) was a Lithuanian chess player who holds the title of International Master (IM, 1988). He is five time winner of Lithuanian Chess Championship (1972, 1974, 1978, 1984, 1988) and two time winner of Baltic Chess Championship (1977, 1988).

== Biography ==
From the 1970s to the 1990s, Gintautas Piešina was one of the leading Lithuanian chess players. He was a multiple participant of the Lithuanian Chess Championships, in which he won nine medals: 5 gold (1972 ((won additional match with Algimantas Butnorius 3½ : 2½), 1974, 1978 (shared with Viktor Gavrikov who participated outside the competition), 1984, 1988 (shared with Vitalijus Majorovas and Darius Ruželė, and was better by an additional factor), 3 silver (1981, 1987, 1995) and bronze (1994). Also Gintautas Piešina twice won Baltic Chess Championship: 1977 in Gomel and 1988 in Panevėžys. In 1993 in Vilnius Gintautas Piešina participated in FIDE World Chess Championship Baltic country Zonal tournament.

Gintautas Piešina played for Lithuania in Soviet Team Chess Championships (1975-1979, 1985) and won individual gold medal in 1985.

Gintautas Piešina played for Lithuania in the Chess Olympiad:

- In 1994, at reserve board in the 31st Chess Olympiad in Moscow (+1, =0, -0).

In 1996 Gintautas Piešina played for Vilnius Chess School in European Chess Club Cup.

In 1988 he was awarded the FIDE International Master (IM) title.
