= Aloyzas Kveinys =

Lithuanian chess grandmaster (1962–2018)

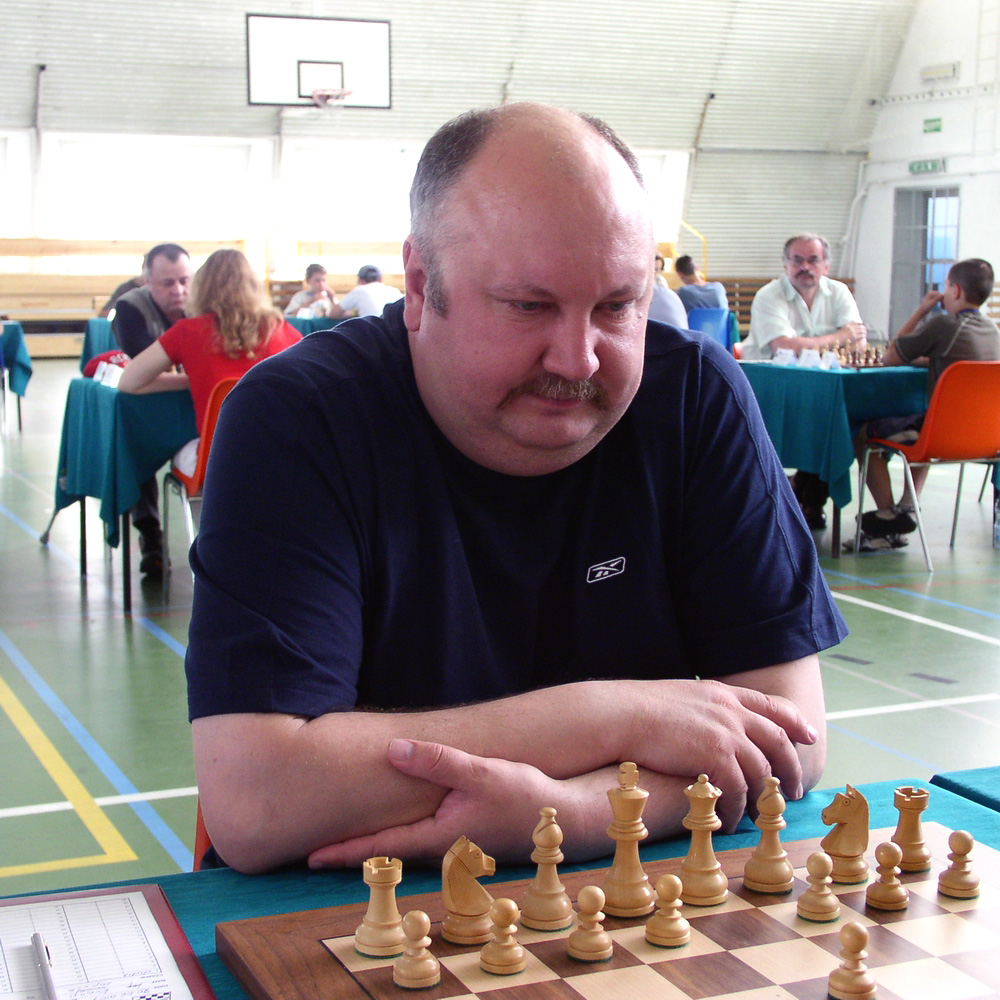

Personal information
- Born: 9 July 1962 Mažeikiai, Lithuania
- Died: 26 July 2018 (aged 56)

Chess career
- Title: Grandmaster (1992)
- Peak rating: 2565 (July 2004)

Aloyzas Kveinys (9 July 1962 – 26 July 2018) was a Lithuanian chess player who was awarded the Grandmaster title in 1992.

== Biography ==
Kveinys was awarded the Soviet Master of Sport title for chess in 1981. He won the Lithuanian championship 5 times: in 1983 (shared with Eduardas Rozentalis), 1986, 2001 (shared with Šarūnas Šulskis), 2008 and 2012. In 2010 he won a tournament in Moss, Norway. In March 2013 he won the Mallorca Masters. In 2015, Kveinys tied for first place in the U.S. Masters Chess Championship. In 2016, he won the Chess Festival in Bad Wörishofen. He was awarded the FIDE titles of International Master in 1990 and Grandmaster in 1992. He was a graduate of the chess department of the Moscow Institute of Physical Culture and Sports (now Russian State University of Physical Education, Sport, Youth and Tourism).

Kveinys played for Lithuania in 8 Chess Olympiads:

- In 1992, at fourth board in the 30th Chess Olympiad in Manila (+4 −4 =6)
- In 1994, at third board in the 31st Chess Olympiad in Moscow (+3 −3 =5)
- In 1996, at fourth board in the 32nd Chess Olympiad in Erevan (+4 −4 =2)
- In 2000, at first board in the 34th Chess Olympiad in Istanbul (+3 −2 =8)
- In 2002, at fourth board in the 35th Chess Olympiad in Bled (+7 −3 =4)
- In 2004, at third board in the 36th Chess Olympiad in Calvia (+3 −3 =6)
- In 2006, at second board in the 37th Chess Olympiad in Turin (+4 −0 =8)
- In 2008, at first board in the 38th Chess Olympiad in Dresden (+1 −4 =6)

He has also represented Lithuania in 5 European Team Chess Championships:

- In 1992, at second board in the 10th European Team Chess Championship in Debrecen (+2 −2 =5);
- In 2003, at first board in the 14th European Team Chess Championship in Plovdiv (+2 −2 =4);
- In 2005, at third board in the 15th European Team Chess Championship in Gothenburg (+1 −0 =8);
- In 2007, at third board in the 16th European Team Chess Championship in Heraklion (+3 −3 =2);
- In 2015, at first board in the 19th European Team Chess Championship in Warsaw (+3 −4 =2).
