= Vilhelmina Kaušilaitė-Kutavičienė =

Lithuanian chess player (1936–1988)

Personal information
- Born: 3 March 1936 Saldus village, Utena County, Molėtai District Municipality, Lithuania
- Died: 23 March 1988 (aged 52) Vilnius, Lithuania

Chess career
- Country: Lithuania

Vilhelmina Kaušilaitė-Kutavičienė (née Kaušilaitė, 3 March 1936 – 23 March 1988) was a Lithuanian chess player. She was eight times winner of Lithuanian Women's Chess Championship (1961, 1968, 1971, 1972, 1974, 1975, 1976, 1977).

== Biography ==
From the beginning of the 1950s to the end of the 1970s, Vilhelmina Kaušilaitė-Kutavičienė was one of the leading female chess players in Lithuania. Eight times she won the Lithuanian Women's Chess Championship (1961, 1968, 1971, 1972, 1974, 1975, 1976, 1977) and became vice-champion the eight times (1956, 1958, 1960, 1964, 1966, 1967, 1976, 1980). She represented the team of the Lithuanian SSR seven times in the Soviet Team Chess Championship (1958-1959, 1963-1967, 1972-1979). In 1968, she represented the team of the Zalgiris sports society in the USSR Chess Cup. In the USSR Women's Chess Championship, she repeatedly participated in the semi-finals, but only reached the final in the 1960.

In 1958 Vilhelmina Kaušilaitė-Kutavičienė graduated from Vilnius University, and until 1959 she studied at the Lithuanian State Conservatory (now Lithuanian Academy of Music and Theatre). Worked as a journalist for LRT televizija. She was the wife of the Lithuanian composer Bronius Kutavičius.
