= Lithuanian Chess Championship =

National chess championship

The first unofficial Lithuanian Chess Championship was held in Kaunas (Temporary capital of Lithuania) in 1921. The Champion's title was granted after victorious or drawn match between previous champion and challenger, mostly a winner of Championship of Kaunas (later - the Championship of Lithuania) in the period from 1922 to World War II. The first official Lithuanian championship was held in 1929. The next year, Lithuania joined FIDE, the World Chess Federation.

When Lithuania was part of the Soviet Union (June 1940 – June 1941 and July 1944 – March 1990), players from other Soviet Republics were sometimes invited to play in the championship. In 1951, Ratmir Kholmov won the championship ahead of the guests Andor Lilienthal, Tigran Petrosian, and Vladimir Simagin.

== Winners ==
#	Year	City	Winner
(1)	1921		A. Rimša the winner of Championship of Kaunas
(2)	1922		Antanas Gustaitis became the Champion (Benjamin Blumenfeld emigrated to Russia before a playoff match could be arranged)
(3)	1923		Aleksandras Machtas, Champion of Kaunas
(4)	1924		Aleksandras Machtas, Champion of Kaunas
(5)	1926		Aleksandras Machtas, Champion of Kaunas
(6)	1927		Aleksandras Machtas won a match with S. Gordonas, Champion of Klaipėda (instead of Markas Luckis, Champion of Kaunas)
(7)	1928		Aleksandras Machtas won a match with S. Gordonas, Champion of Klaipėda (instead of Markas Luckis, Champion of Kaunas)
1	1929		Aronas Jeglinas, Champion of Kaunas and Lithuania
2	1930		Isakas Vistaneckis
3	1931		Aleksandras Machtas
4	1932	Kaunas	Aleksandras Machtas
5	1933		Vladas Mikėnas won a match against Aleksandras Machtas
6	1934		Vladas Mikėnas won a match against Povilas Vaitonis (6:2)
7	1935		Vladas Mikėnas drew a match with Isakas Vistaneckis (8:8)
8	1937		Vladas Mikėnas won a match against Povilas Vaitonis (5.5:4.5)
9	1938		Vladas Mikėnas won a match against Povilas Vaitonis (9:3)
10	1941		Isakas Vistaneckis
11	1942		Leonardas Abramavičius
12	1943	Vilnius	Mečislovas Birmanas
*	1944		Povilas Vaitonis was leading the interrupted tournament
13	1945	Kaunas	Vladas Mikėnas
14	1947	Vilnius	Vladas Mikėnas
15	1948	Vilnius	Vladas Mikėnas
16	1949	Vilnius	Ratmir Kholmov, Isakas Vistaneckis
17	1950	Vilnius	Ratmir Kholmov
18	1951	Vilnius	Ratmir Kholmov
19	1952	Vilnius	Ratmir Kholmov
20	1953	Vilnius	Ratmir Kholmov
21	1954	Vilnius	Isakas Vistaneckis
22	1955	Vilnius	Ratmir Kholmov
23	1956	Kaunas	Isakas Vistaneckis
24	1957	Vilnius	Ratmir Kholmov
25	1958	Vilnius	Ratmir Kholmov
26	1959	Vilnius	Isakas Vistaneckis, Ratmir Kholmov
27	1960	Vilnius	Ratmir Kholmov
28	1961	Vilnius	Vladas Mikėnas
29	1962	Druskininkai	Leonidas Maslovas
30	1963	Vilnius	Leonidas Maslovas
31	1964	Vilnius	Vladas Mikėnas
32	1965	Vilnius	Vladas Mikėnas
33	1966	Vilnius	Leonidas Maslovas
34	1967	Vilnius	Algimantas Butnorius
35	1968	Vilnius	Vladas Mikėnas
36	1969	Vilnius	Antanas Algimantas Česnauskis
37	1970	Kaunas	Algimantas Butnorius
38	1971	Vilnius	Jegor Čiukajevas
39	1972	Kaunas	Gintautas Piešina
40	1973	Klaipėda	Algimantas Butnorius
41	1974	Vilnius	Gintautas Piešina
42	1975	Vilnius	Algimantas Butnorius
43	1976	Kaunas	Algimantas Butnorius
44	1977	Klaipėda	Yuri Balashov
45	1978	Vilnius	Gintautas Piešina
46	1979	Panevėžys	Levas Ševeliovas
47	1980	Kaunas	Algimantas Butnorius
48	1981	Klaipėda	Eduardas Rozentalis
49	1982	Plungė	Algimantas Butnorius
50	1983	Vilnius	Aloyzas Kveinys
51	1984	Klaipėda	Gintautas Piešina
52	1985	Vilnius	Algirdas Bandza, Emilis Šlekys
53	1986	Vilnius	Aloyzas Kveinys
54	1987	Vilnius	Vidmantas Mališauskas
55	1988	Vilnius	Gintautas Piešina
56	1989	Klaipėda	Vidmantas Mališauskas
57	1990	Klaipėda	Vidmantas Mališauskas
58	1991	Vilnius	Šarūnas Šulskis
59	1992	Vilnius	Virginijus Dambrauskas
60	1993	Vilnius	Algimantas Butnorius
61	1994	Vilnius	Šarūnas Šulskis
62	1995	Vilnius	Antanas Zapolskis
63	1996	Vilnius	Vytautas Šlapikas
64	1997	Vilnius	Virginijus Grabliauskas
65	1998	Vilnius	Vidmantas Mališauskas
66	1999	Vilnius	Antanas Zapolskis
67	2000	Vilnius	Viktorija Čmilytė
68	2001	Kaunas	Šarūnas Šulskis
69	2002	Vilnius	Eduardas Rozentalis
70	2003	Vilnius	Vidmantas Mališauskas
71	2004	Vilnius	Darius Zagorskis
72	2005	Šiauliai	Viktorija Čmilytė
73	2006	Vilnius	Vidmantas Mališauskas
74	2007	Šiauliai	Šarūnas Šulskis
75	2008	Kaunas	Aloyzas Kveinys
76	2009	Vilnius	Šarūnas Šulskis
77	2010	Nemenčinė	Vidmantas Malisauskas
78	2011	Nemenčinė	Šarūnas Šulskis
79	2012	Vilnius	Aloyzas Kveinys
80	2013	Vilnius	Darius Zagorskis
81	2014	Vilnius	Šarūnas Šulskis
82	2015	Kaunas	Šarūnas Šulskis
83	2016	Vilnius	Tomas Laurusas
84	2017	Vilnius	Vidmantas Mališauskas
85	2018	Kaunas	Vidmantas Mališauskas
86	2019	Vilnius	Tomas Laurusas
87	2020	Vilnius	Karolis Jukšta
88	2021	Vilnius	Titas Stremavičius
89	2022	Vilnius	Karolis Jukšta
90	2023	Kaunas	Tomas Laurusas
91	2024	Vilnius	Tomas Laurusas
92	2025	Vilnius	Titas Stremavičius
93	2026	Klaipėda	Titas Stremavičius

== Women ==
Year	City	Winner
1938	Kaunas	Elena Raclauskienė
1949	Vilnius	Elena Raclauskienė-Lukauskienė
1950	Vilnius	Klavdiya Čiukajeva
1951	Vilnius	Klavdiya Čiukajeva
1952	Vilnius	Klavdiya Čiukajeva
1953	Vilnius	Klavdiya Čiukajeva
1954	Vilnius	Maria Lichtenfeld
1955	Vilnius	Maria Lichtenfeld
1956	Kaunas	Marija Kartanaitė
1957	Vilnius	Marija Kartanaitė
1958	Vilnius	Marija Kartanaitė
1959	Vilnius	Nina Špikienė
1960	Vilnius	Nina Špikienė
1961	Vilnius	Vilhelmina Kaušilaitė
1962	Vilnius	Ilana Epšteinaitė
1963	Vilnius	Marija Kartanaitė
1964	Vilnius	Marija Kartanaitė
1965	Vilnius	Ilana Rozentalienė
1966	Vilnius	Marija Kartanaitė
1967	Vilnius	Marija Kartanaitė
1968	Vilnius	Vilhelmina Kaušilaitė
1969	Vilnius	Marija Kartanaitė
1970	Vilnius	Marija Kartanaitė
1971	Vilnius	Vilhelmina Kaušilaitė
1972	Vilnius	Vilhelmina Kaušilaitė
1973	Vilnius	Lilija Benensonaitė
1974	Kaunas	Vilhelmina Kaušilaitė
1975	Vilnius	Vilhelmina Kaušilaitė
1976	Vilnius	Vilhelmina Kaušilaitė
1977	Panevėžys	Vilhelmina Kaušilaitė
1978	Vilnius	Rasa Kartanaitė
1979	Panevėžys	Rasa Kartanaitė
1980	Vilnius	Marija Kartanaitė
1981	Vilnius	Esther Epstein
1982	Vilnius	Esther Epstein
1983	Vilnius	Rasa Kartanaitė
1984	Vilnius	Esther Epstein
1985	Vilnius	Marina Kurkul
1986	Šiauliai	Esther Epstein
1987	Šiauliai	Laima Domarkaitė
1988	Šiauliai	Renata Domkutė
1989	Šiauliai	Laima Domarkaitė
1990	Šiauliai	Vilma Domkutė
1991	Panevėžys	Rita Dambravaitė
1992	Panevėžys	Kamilė Baginskaitė
1993	Vilkaviškis	Marina Kurkul
1994	Vilkaviškis	Dagnė Čiukšytė
1995	Panevėžys	Laima Domarkaitė
1996	Marijampolė	Dagnė Čiukšytė
1997	Šiauliai	Dagnė Čiukšytė
1998	Vilnius	Živilė Čiukšytė
1999	Vilnius	Rita Dambravaitė-Varnienė
2000	Vilnius	Viktorija Čmilytė
2001	Vilnius	Renata Turauskienė
2002	Nemenčinė	Živilė Šarakauskienė
2003	Panevėžys	Dagnė Čiukšytė
2004	Šiauliai	Daiva Batytė
2005	Vilnius	Simona Limontaitė
2006	Šiauliai	Deimantė Daulytė
2007	Vilnius	Deimantė Daulytė
2008	Panevėžys	Deimantė Daulytė
2009	Vilnius	Živilė Šarakauskienė
2010	Nemenčinė	Vesta Kalvytė
2011	Nemenčinė	Živilė Šarakauskienė
2012	Vilnius	Deimantė Daulytė
2013	Vilnius	Deimantė Daulytė
2014	Vilnius	Salomėja Zaksaitė
2015	Vilnius	Daiva Batytė
2016	Vilnius	Salomėja Zaksaitė
2017	Vilnius	Simona Kiseleva
2018	Kaunas	Ieva Žalimaitė
2019	Vilnius	Marija Šibajeva
2020	Vilnius	Kamilė Baginskaitė
2021	Vilnius	Gabija Šimkūnaitė
2022	Vilnius	Olena Martynkova
2023	Panevėžys	Olena Martynkova
2024	Vilnius	Simona Limontaitė
2025	Vilnius	Salomėja Zaksaitė
2026	Klaipėda	Gabija Šimkūnaitė
