= Vesta Kasputė =

Lithuanian chess player (born 1984)

Personal information
- Born: Vesta Kalvytė; 5 December 1984 (age 41) Panevėžys, Soviet Union

Chess career
- Country: Lithuania
- Title: Woman FIDE Master (2010)
- Peak rating: 2118 (July 2012)

Vesta Kasputė (Vesta Kalvytė; born 5 December 1984 in Panevėžys) is a Lithuanian chess player with the title of Woman FIDE Master (WFM), lawyer at "bnt" Law Firm.

== Early years ==
In 2010, she was awarded the title of Women FIDE Master (WFM). In 2010, she won the Lithuanian Chess Championship for women.

Her current Elo rating is 2087 (as of January 2012), her highest Elo rating was 2102.

== Personal life ==
2003 she attended Juozas Balčikonis Gymnasium. After she graduated from her 2003 to 2008 program of master studies in law at the Law Faculty of Vilnius University. From May 2011 she is associate at the East European law firm "bnt".

Kalvytė speaks English.
