= Vilma Paulauskienė =

Lithuanian chess player (born 1966)

Personal information
- Born: 21 May 1966 (age 60) Šiauliai, Lithuania

Chess career
- Country: Lithuania
- Peak rating: 2097 (January 2009)

Vilma Paulauskienė (née Domkutė, born 21 May 1966) is a Lithuanian chess player. She is the winner of Lithuanian Women's Chess Championship (1990).

== Biography ==
From the late 1980s to the early 1990s, Vilma was one of the strongest female chess players in Lithuania. She is multiple medalist of the Lithuanian Women's Chess Championships, in which she won gold (1990), two silver (1986, 1987) and bronze (1989) medals.

Vilma Paulauskienė played for Lithuania in the European Women's Team Chess Championships:

- In 1992, at first reserve board in the 1st European Team Chess Championship (women) in Debrecen (+1, =1, -2).

Vilma Paulauskienė is a teacher by profession: math teacher and chess trainer.

Her youngest sister is Lithuanian chess master Renata Turauskienė who twice won Lithuanian Women's Chess Championship (1988, 2001).
