= Laima Domarkaitė =

Lithuanian chess player (born 1970)

Personal information
- Born: 1 April 1970 (age 56) Plungė, Lithuania

Chess career
- Country: Lithuania
- Title: Woman FIDE Master (1998)
- Peak rating: 2192 (January 1999)

Laima Domarkaitė (born 1 April 1970) is a Lithuanian chess player who holds the title of Woman FIDE Master (WFM, 1998). She is three times winner of Lithuanian Women's Chess Championship (1987, 1989, 1995).

== Biography ==
Laima Domarkaitė was student of Plunge sports schools and her first trainer was Vitalius Vladas Andriušaitis. In 1981 she won Lithuanian Girls Chess CHampionship. She won Soviet Girls Chess Championships: 1985 (U-16) and 1988 (U-18). In 1987 Laima Domarkaitė was awarded Soviet Chess Master of Sports title.

She participated regularly at the Lithuanian Women's Chess Championships and won eight medals: 3 gold (1987, 1989, 1995. Чемпионка Литвы 1995 г.), 2 silver (2014, 2017) and 3 bronze (1990, 2000, 2016).

In 1992 Laima Domarkaitė with chess club "MLKS Hańcza Suwałki" won bronze in Polish Team Chess Championship.

With the chess club "Širvinta Vilkaviškis" she was participant of European Chess Club Cup among women in 1998 and 1999. With the chess club "VŠK Bokštas Plungė" she was winner of the Lithuanian Team Chess Championship in 1997, and bronze medalist of the Lithuanian Team Chess Championships in 1998 and 2015, participant in the European Chess Club Cup among women in 1996 and 2007.

Laima Domarkaitė played for Lithuania in the Women's Chess Olympiads:

- In 2000, at third board in the 34th Chess Olympiad (women) in Istanbul (+3, =5, -4),
- In 2014, at third board in the 41st Chess Olympiad (women) in Tromsø (+1, =2, -3),
- In 2016, at reserve board in the 42nd Chess Olympiad (women) in Baku (+3, =3, -2).

Laima Domarkaitė was member of the Lithuanian Chess Federation Presidium (1989–93), Council (1999-2000, 2005), Director of the Lithuanian Chess Federation (2005-2010), Administrator of the Lithuanian Chess Federation website www.chessfed.lt (2005-2010), International Chess Federation federation (FIDE) ratings administrator (LTU, 2005–10), FIDE congress delegate (Dresden, 2008).

She also is FIDE Arbiter (2014), International Arbiter (2015), FIDE Trainer (2017).

Laima Domarkaitė is translation consultant of Kasparov's book "Life as a game of chess" (Vilnius, 2007). She was author of the Swiss Manager translation of chess tournament administration and draw software into Lithuanian (2013), author of the translation of the website www.chess-results.com into Lithuanian (2013); author of the translation of the playchess.com application into Lithuanian (2015).
