= Vladas Mikėnas =

Lithuanian chess player (1910–1992)

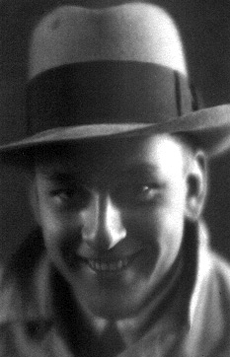
- Vladas Mikėnas (Kaunas, 1931)

Personal information
- Born: 17 April 1910 Reval, Russian Empire (now Tallinn, Estonia)
- Died: 3 November 1992 (aged 82) Vilnius, Lithuania

Chess career
- Country: Lithuania
- Title: International Master
- Peak rating: 2410 (July 1971)

Vladas Mikėnas (17 April 1910 – 3 November 1992) was a Lithuanian and Soviet chess player and journalist. He was awarded the titles of International Master and Honorary Grandmaster by FIDE.

== Early career ==
Vladas Mikėnas played for Lithuania at first board in five official and one unofficial Chess Olympiads.

- In July 1931, he played at the 4th Chess Olympiad in Prague (+7–5=6).
- In July 1933, he played at the 5th Chess Olympiad in Folkestone (+5–3=6).
- In August 1935, he played at the 6th Chess Olympiad in Warsaw (+2–6=10).
- In August/September 1936, he played at the unofficial Olympiad in Munich (+5–7=8).
- In July/August 1937, he played at the 7th Chess Olympiad in Stockholm (+7–3=8).
- In August/September 1939, he played at the 8th Chess Olympiad in Buenos Aires (+10–5=4).

In 1930, he won the Estonian Championship in Tallinn (3rd EST-ch). In 1931, he tied for 2nd–5th at the first Baltic Championship in Klaipėda, which was won by Isakas Vistaneckis. In the same year, Mikėnas emigrated from Estonia to Lithuania. In 1934, he won a match against Povilas Vaitonis (6:2). In 1935, he took 10th in Łódź (Savielly Tartakower won), and drew a match with Vistaneckis (8:8). In 1936, he won the Lithuanian Championship. In 1937, he won a match against Vaitonis (5½:4½).

Alekhine vs. Mikėnas, Kemeri 1937

Position: h1 white king, e1 white rook, a1 white rook, h2 white pawn, f2 white pawn, e2 white queen, b2 white bishop, g3 white pawn, f3 white knight, a3 white pawn, g4 black queen, e4 white knight, f5 black bishop, e5 white pawn, d5 black knight, b5 white pawn, a5 black pawn, g6 black pawn, h7 black pawn, f7 black pawn, e7 black pawn, b7 black pawn, g8 black king, d8 black rook, c8 black rook

In this position Mikėnas played ...Bxe4, missing ...Rc2, deflecting the queen from the protection of the knight in f3, with forced mate after Bh3.

In 1937, he took 10th in Kemeri; despite his lowly placing, he defeated Alexander Alekhine. In that game he missed a deflection tactic (see diagram) which prompted Alekhine to say: "Young man, you could have mated in three!". To which Mikėnas replied: "Never mind. I will win it over again."

In 1937/38, he took 6th at Hastings (Samuel Reshevsky won). In 1938, he won a match against Vaitonis (9:3). In 1939, he took 4th in Kemeri–Riga (Salo Flohr won). In September 1939, he took 3rd in Rosario (Vladimirs Petrovs won).

== Soviet citizen ==
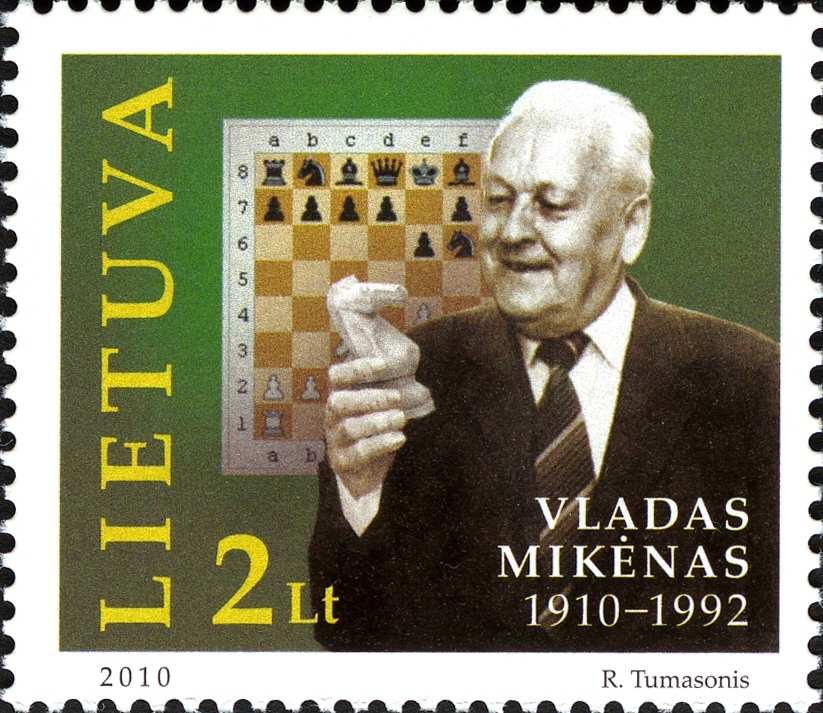

On 28 September 1939, the Soviet Union and Germany had changed the secret terms of the Molotov–Ribbentrop Pact. They moved Lithuania into the Soviet sphere of influence. Lithuania was annexed by the Soviet Union on 3 August 1940.

In September/October 1940, Mikėnas tied for 13–16th in Moscow (12th USSR-ch).

In 1941, he took 3rd (off contest) in Kutaisi (4th Georgian SSR ch). In February/March 1942, he tied for 3rd–6th in Moscow. In March/April 1942, he tied for 4–7th in Sverdlovsk. In July/August 1942, he tied for 3rd–5th in Kuibyshev. In 1943/44, he took 7th in the 23rd Moscow-ch. In 1944, he won (off contest) in Tbilisi (5th Georgian SSR ch). In 1944, he won a classification match against Ljublinsky (8:6).

In 1944, he tied for 5–6th in Moscow (13th USSR-ch). In July 1945, he won in Kaunas (13th LTU-ch). In September/October 1945, he took 7th at Tallinn (EST-ch, Paul Keres won). In October/November 1945, he won in Riga (Baltic Chess Championship). In June/July 1946, he took 3rd, behind Yuri Averbakh, and Vistaneckis, in Vilnius (Baltic Rep.-ch). In 1946, he took 2nd (off contest) in Tbilisi (7th Georgian SSR ch). In 1947, he took 2nd (off contest) in Minsk (13th Belarusian Championship). In 1948, he drew a classification match against Rashid Nezhmetdinov (7:7).

He played several times in Lithuanian SSR championships in Vilnius. He won the 14th LTU-ch in 1947, won in 1948, took 3rd in 1949, took 6th in 1951, tied for 2nd–4th in 1952, took 6th in 1953, took 2nd in 1954, took 3rd in 1955, took 2nd in 1957, tied for 2nd–4th in 1958, took 3rd in 1959, tied for 3rd–4th in 1960, won in 1961, took 2nd in 1963, won in 1964, shared 1st in 1965, tied for 2nd–3rd in 1967, and tied for 1st–2nd in 1968.

Meanwhile, in 1954, he won, ahead of Ratmir Kholmov, Vistaneckis and Viacheslav Ragozin, in Vilnius (Quadrangular). In 1955, he tied for 3rd–6th in Pärnu (Keres won). In 1959, he took 2nd, behind Boris Spassky, in Riga. In 1960, he took 10th in Pärnu (Baltic Rep. ch, Keres won), and shared 4th at Leningrad (Mark Taimanov won). In 1964, he tied 2nd–3rd, behind Iivo Nei, in Pärnu (Baltic Rep. ch). In 1965, he won in Palanga (Baltic Rep. ch). In 1971, he won in Lublin, Poland. Mikėnas played his last international event in Vilnius in 1978.

Mikėnas was awarded the International Master title in 1950 (the year the title was instituted). He was awarded the Honorary Grandmaster title in 1987.

He was the arbiter of the World Championship match between Anatoly Karpov and Garry Kasparov in 1985.

== Legacy and popular culture ==
In 2010, Lithuania Post issued a commemorative postage stamp honoring Mikėnas on his 100th birthday anniversary.

In 2020, a chess variation named after Mikėnas was mentioned in episode five of the Netflix miniseries The Queen's Gambit, highlighting his continued recognition in popular culture.

== Contributions ==
The Mikėnas Variation of the Modern Benoni, a sharp attacking line (1.d4 Nf6 2.c4 c5 3.d5 e6 4.Nc3 exd5 5.cxd5 d6 6.e4 g6 7.f4 Bg7 8.e5), is named after him. He also developed the Flohr–Mikėnas Variation of the English Opening; the variation runs 1.c4 Nf6 2.Nc3 e6 3.e4.
