= Antanas Algimantas Česnauskis =

Lithuanian chess player (1936–2008)

Personal information
- Born: 25 April 1936
- Died: 31 March 2008 (aged 71) Panevėžys, Lithuania

Chess career
- Country: Lithuania

Antanas Algimantas Česnauskis (25 April 1936 – 31 March 2008) was a Lithuanian chess player who won Lithuanian Chess Championship (1969).

== Biography ==
Antanas Algimantas Česnauskis won Lithuanian Chess Championship in 1969. He won silver medals in the Lithuanian Chess Championship in 1962, 1964 and 1966, and bronze medal in 1972.

Together with Vilnius city team, he was a multiple winner of the Lithuanian Team Chess Championships (1957, 1958, 1961).

Antanas Algimantas Česnauskis was four-time winner of Lithuanian Sports Associations Nemunas Chess Championships (1955, 1972, 1974, 1979).

Antanas Algimantas Česnauskis with Lithuanian SSR national team, he was a multiple participant in the USSR Team Chess Championships and Spartakiad of the Peoples of the USSR (in 1969 he played on the 1st board). The overall result of performances in team tournaments of all-Union significance: +8, -10, =11. His best result was at Spartakiad of the Peoples of the USSR in 1963: small silver medal on the 6th board.

He was the coach of the Lithuanian SSR team. For many years he led the city chess club in Panevezys. In 2003, he was awarded the medal of the Municipality of Panevezys for merits in the sport.
