= Daiva Batytė =

Lithuanian chess player (born 1980)

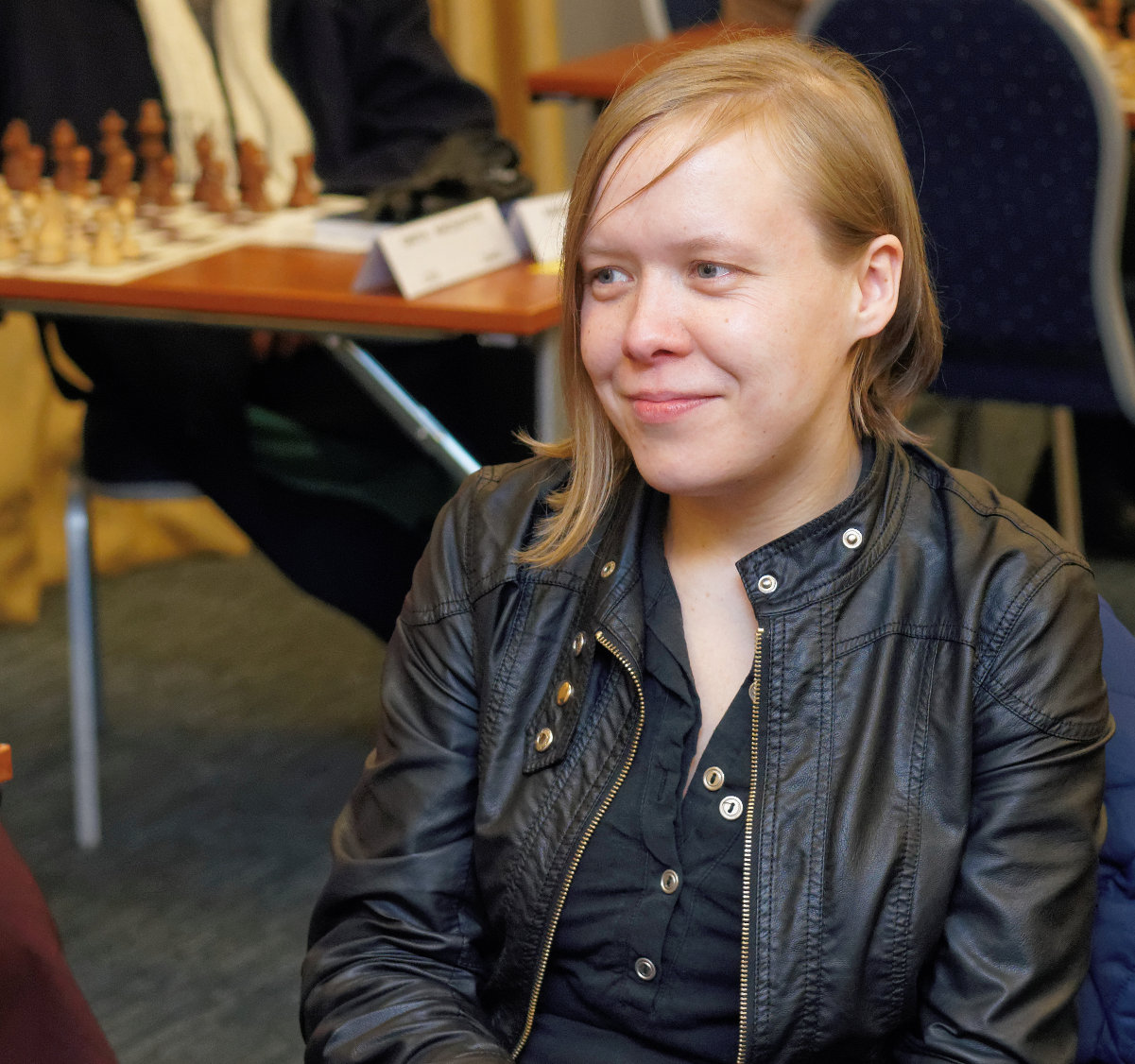
- Daiva Batytė in 2015

Personal information
- Born: 22 August 1980 (age 46) Plungė, Lithuania

Chess career
- Country: Lithuania
- Title: Woman International Master (2018)
- Peak rating: 2230 (October 2017)

Daiva Batytė (born 22 August 1980) is a Lithuanian chess Woman International Master (WIM) (2018). She is a two-time winner of the Lithuanian Women's Chess Championship (2004, 2015).

== Chess career ==
Batytė studied at the Plungė Chess School and is a member of the Plungės visuomeninis šachmatų klubas "Bokštas" chess club. Her coach was Vitalius Vladas Andriušaitis. In 2004 and 2015 she won the Lithuanian Women's Chess Championship; 2002, 2007, 2016 and in 2018 she was runner-up in this tournament. With the Lithuanian women's team she took part in 2000, 2004, 2006 and 2016 at the Chess Olympiad and in 2007 and 2015 at the European Team Chess Championship.

Batytė lives in Vienna. She has been a trainer since 2013 and trainer in the Viennese women's chess club Frau Schach. In the 2015/16 season, Batytė played in the Austrian 2. Chess Bundesliga for SV Stockerau and in the Austrian women's league as a guest player for champion ASVÖ Pamhagen. In the Bundesliga season 2018/19 (Austria, women) she again won the Austrian women's team championship with Pamhagen. In the Bundesliga season 2019/20 (Austria, women) she plays in the women's national league for the Spielgemeinschaft Steyr. In Lithuania she played for ŠK Margiris Kaunas, with which she took part in the 1999 European Chess Club Cup women's event.
