= Vidmantas Mališauskas =

Lithuanian chess grandmaster (born 1963)

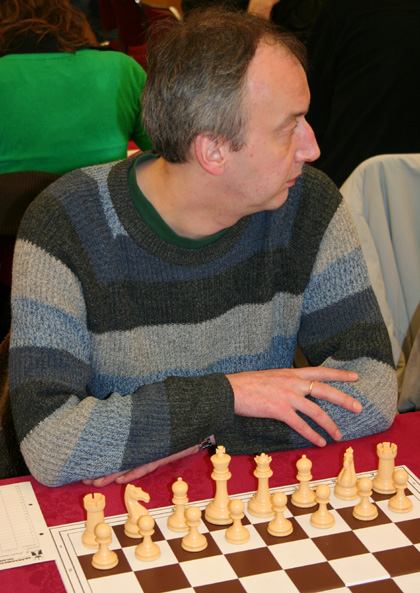
- Mališauskas in March 2008

Personal information
- Born: 4 August 1963 (age 62) Lithuanian SSR, Soviet Union

Chess career
- Country: Lithuania
- Title: Grandmaster (1993)
- Peak rating: 2570 (January 1993)

Vidmantas Mališauskas (born 4 August 1963) is a Lithuanian chess Grandmaster (1993).

== Chess career ==
He won the Lithuanian Chess Championship on six occasions: in 1987, 1989, 1990, 1998 (shared with Šarūnas Šulskis), 2003 and 2006. Played for Lithuania in the Chess Olympiads of 1992, 1994, 1996, 1998, 2002, 2006 and in the European Team Chess Championships of 1992 and 2007. Other notable results include 2nd (behind Maxim Matlakov) in the Gipslis Memorial 2009 and 2nd (behind Vadim Shishkin) in the Lubawka Gate Open 2009.

== Chess strength ==
According to Chessmetrics, at his peak in May 1993 Mališauskas's play was equivalent to a rating of 2666, and he was ranked number 49 in the world. His best single performance was at POL-chT Bydgoszcz, 1990, where he scored 6 of 6 possible points (100%) against 2472-rated opposition, for a performance rating of 2671.
