= Karolis Jukšta =

Lithuanian chess player

Personal information
- Born: July 28, 2003 (age 22)

Chess career
- Country: Lithuania
- Title: International Master (2023)
- Peak rating: 2438 (June 2021)

Karolis Jukšta (born July 28, 2003) is a Lithuanian chess player. He was awarded the title of FIDE Master in 2019 and the title of International Master in 2023.

== Chess career ==
Jukšta won the Lithuanian Chess Championship in 2020 at the age of 17, becoming the second-youngest player to do so. He won the title again in 2022.

He qualified for the Chess World Cup 2021, where he was defeated 1½-½ by Arik Braun in the first round.
