= Klavdiya Chukaeva =

Lithuanian chess player

Personal information
- Born: 1925
- Died: unknown
- Spouse: Egor Chukaev

Chess career
- Country: Soviet Union

Klavdiya Chukaeva (Russian: Клавдия Ивановна Чукаева; Lithuanian: Klavdija Čiukajeva; 1925 – unknown) was a Lithuanian chess player. She was four times winner of Lithuanian Women's Chess Championship (1950, 1951, 1952, 1953).

== Biography ==
Klavdiya Chukaeva was participant of the Russian Women's Chess Championship in 1950 and semi-final of the USSR Women's Chess Championship in 1949.

She married chess master Egor Chukaev and moved to Lithuania. They lived in Kaunas.

In the 1950s Klavdiya Chukaeva was one of the leading Lithuanian chess players. She won six medals at the Lithuanian Women's Chess Championships: four gold (1950, 1951, 1952, 1953) and two bronze (1949, 1954). In 1950, she won championship with a hundred percent result - 10 points out of 10 possible.

At the end of the 1950s, she ended her active career as a chess player.
