= Isakas Vistaneckis =

Lithuanian, Soviet and Israeli chess player (1910-2000)

Personal information
- Native name: איסקאס ויסטנקיס
- Born: 29 September 1910 Marijampolė, Russian Empire
- Died: 30 December 2000 (aged 90) Tel Aviv, Israel

Chess career
- Country: Lithuania
- Title: International Master (1970)
- Years active: 1930–1971
- Peak rating: 2534 (February 1958)
- Peak ranking: No. 61 (April 1943)

Isakas Vistaneckis (Russian: Исаак Ильич Вистанецкис; Hebrew: איסקאס ויסטנקיס; 29 September 1910 – 30 December 2000) was a Lithuanian, Soviet and Israeli chess player who held the chess title of Correspondence Chess International Master (IM).

== Biography ==
In 1930, Isakas Vistaneckis won the Lithuanian Championship. In May 1931, he won the 1st Baltic Championship at Klaipėda. In 1935, he won the Lithuanian Championship. In 1935, he drew a match against Vladas Mikėnas, (+5 –5 =6).

Vistaneckis played for Lithuania in five official Chess Olympiads and in one unofficial Olympiad at Munich 1936:

- In July 1930, on third board at the 3rd Chess Olympiad in Hamburg (+3 –9 =4).
- In July 1931, on third board at the 4th Chess Olympiad in Prague (+2 –8 =4).
- In July 1933, on third board at the 5th Chess Olympiad in Folkestone (+4 –3 =6).
- In August 1935, on third board at the 6th Chess Olympiad in Warsaw (+3 –8 =4).
- In August/September 1936, on third board at the 3rd unofficial Chess Olympiad in Munich (+9 –4 =7).
- In July/August 1937, on third board at the 7th Chess Olympiad in Stockholm (+5 –8 =3).

In 1941, he won the 1st Lithuanian SSR Championship. In June 1941, he played at Rostov-on-Don (Rostov-na-Donu) (sf USSR ch.). In 1942, he tied for 4th-7th at Sverdlovsk (Ekaterinburg), behind Viacheslav Ragozin, Vladimirs Petrovs, and Alexei Sokolsky. In February–March 1944, he played at Omsk (sf USSR ch.). In 1945, he tied for 6th-8th at Baku (sf USSR ch.). In October–November 1945, he tied for 3rd-4th with Alexander Koblencs, behind Mikenas and Alexander Tolush, at Riga (Baltic Republics ch.). In June–July 1946, he took 2nd, behind Yuri Averbakh, at Vilnius (Baltic Rep. ch). In 1947, he won a match against Zagoriansky (+4 –2 =8).

In 1947, he took 12th at Sverdlovsk (sf USSR ch.). In 1949, he tied for 9th-10th at Vilnius (sf USSR ch.). In 1950, he tied for 14th-15th at Tula (sf USSR ch.). In 1951, he tied for 9th-10th at Lvov (sf USSR ch.). In 1953, he took 13th at Vilnius (sf USSR ch.). In 1954, he tied for 3rd-4th at Vilnius (Quadrangular). In 1954, he tied for 14th-15th at Erevan (sf USSR ch.). In 1957, he tied for 8th-9th at Minsk (zt USSR ch.). In 1960, he tied for 16th-17th at Vilnius (sf USSR ch.). In 1961, he tied for 13th-15th at Palanga (Baltic Rep. ch.). In 1962, he tied for 11th-12th at Tbilisi. In 1963, he tied for 13th-14th in Estonia (Baltic Rep. ch.). In 1964, he took 10th at Pärnu (Baltic Rep. ch.).

Vistaneckis played many times at Lithuanian SSR championships. In 1949, he tied for 1st with Ratmir Kholmov at Vilnius. In 1954, he won, ahead of Mikenas, at Vilnius. In 1956, he won at Kaunas. In 1959, he tied for 1st with Kholmov at Vilnius. In 1960, he took 2nd at Vilnius. In 1964, he tied for 2nd-3rd with Česnauskas, behind Mikenas, at Vilnius.

At the end of the 1970s, he emigrated to Israel. The Vistaneckis Variation of the Main Line of the French Defense (1.e4 e6 2.d4 d5 3.Nc3 Nf6 4.Bg5 Be7 5.e5 Ng8) is named for him.

== Notable chess games ==
- Isakas Vistaneckis vs Marcel Engelmann (BEL), Folkestone 1933, 5th Olympiad, Nimzo-Indian, Classical, E38, 1-0
- Isakas Vistaneckis vs Henry Grob (SWI), Munich (ol) 1936, French, Classical Variation., C14, 1-0
- Isakas Vistaneckis vs Vladimirs Petrovs, Sverdlovsk 1942, Queen's Gambit Declined, Slav, D16, 1-0
- Isakas Vistaneckis vs Salo Flohr, Erevan 1954, sf URS–ch, Queen's Gambit Accepted, D26, 1-0
- Isakas Vistaneckis vs Roberts Skuja, Minsk 1957, zt URS-ch, Queen's Gambit Declined, Slav, D11, 1-0
