= Eduardas Rozentalis =

Lithuanian chess grandmaster (born 1963)

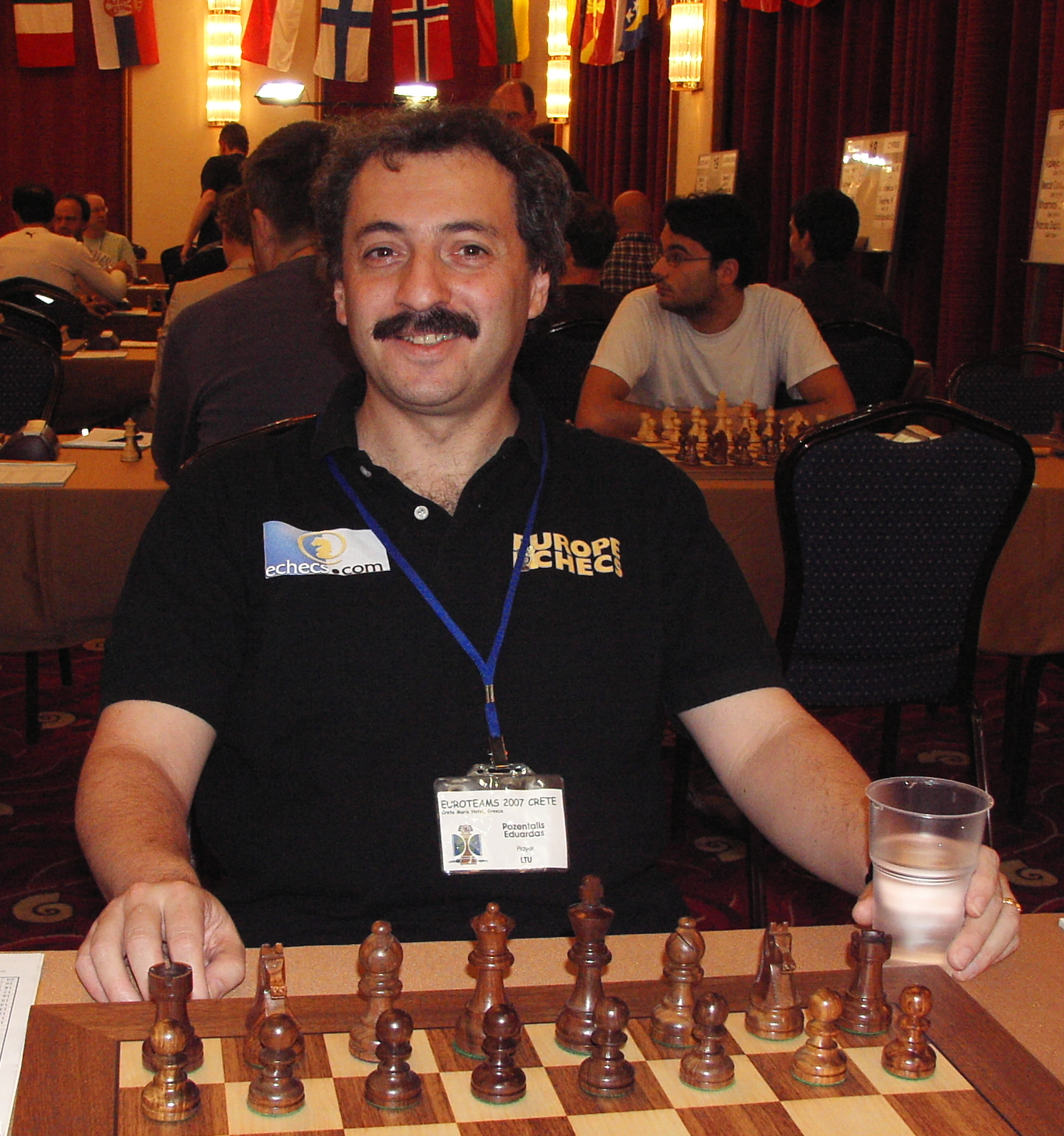
- Eduardas Rozentalis in 2007

Personal information
- Born: 27 May 1963 (age 63) Vilnius, Lithuania

Chess career
- Country: Lithuania
- Title: Grandmaster (1991)
- FIDE rating: 2446 (July 2026)
- Peak rating: 2650 (January 1997)
- Peak ranking: No. 19 (January 1997)

Eduardas Rozentalis (born 27 May 1963 in Vilnius) is a Lithuanian chess grandmaster.

== Chess career ==
He played for the Lithuanian team in every Chess Olympiad since 1992, except in 2000 and 2012. Rozentalis won the Lithuanian Chess Championship in 1981, 1983 (jointly with Aloyzas Kveinys) and 2002.

In 1995 he tied for first in the Canadian Open Chess Championship. He also tied for first, with 6/9, in the 2008 staging of this event, in Montreal. At the Rilton Cup 2005/6 in Stockholm he was shared 1st with Normunds Miezis, Sergey Ivanov, Tomi Nybäck and Evgeny Postny. In 2009/10 he tied for 1st-5th with Radosław Wojtaszek, Pavel Ponkratov, Luke McShane and Igor Lysyj at the 39th Rilton Cup in Stockholm. In May 2010, he won the 3rd Magistral Ciudad de Asunción Copa Roggio tournament. In 2012 Rozentalis won the Cultural Village tournament in Wijk aan Zee and qualified for the Grandmaster Group C of the 2013 Tata Steel Chess Tournament; however, he did not take part in the latter event.

In 2019, he won the GM Winter Petach Tikva international tournament with a score of 7.5/9

In 2018, the second edition of his book The Correct Exchange in the Endgame was published.

His mother is Ilana Rozentalienė (b. 1937) who twice won Lithuanian Women's Chess Championship (1962, 1965).

== See also ==
- List of Jewish chess players
