= Živilė Šarakauskienė =

Lithuanian-English chess player (born 1978)

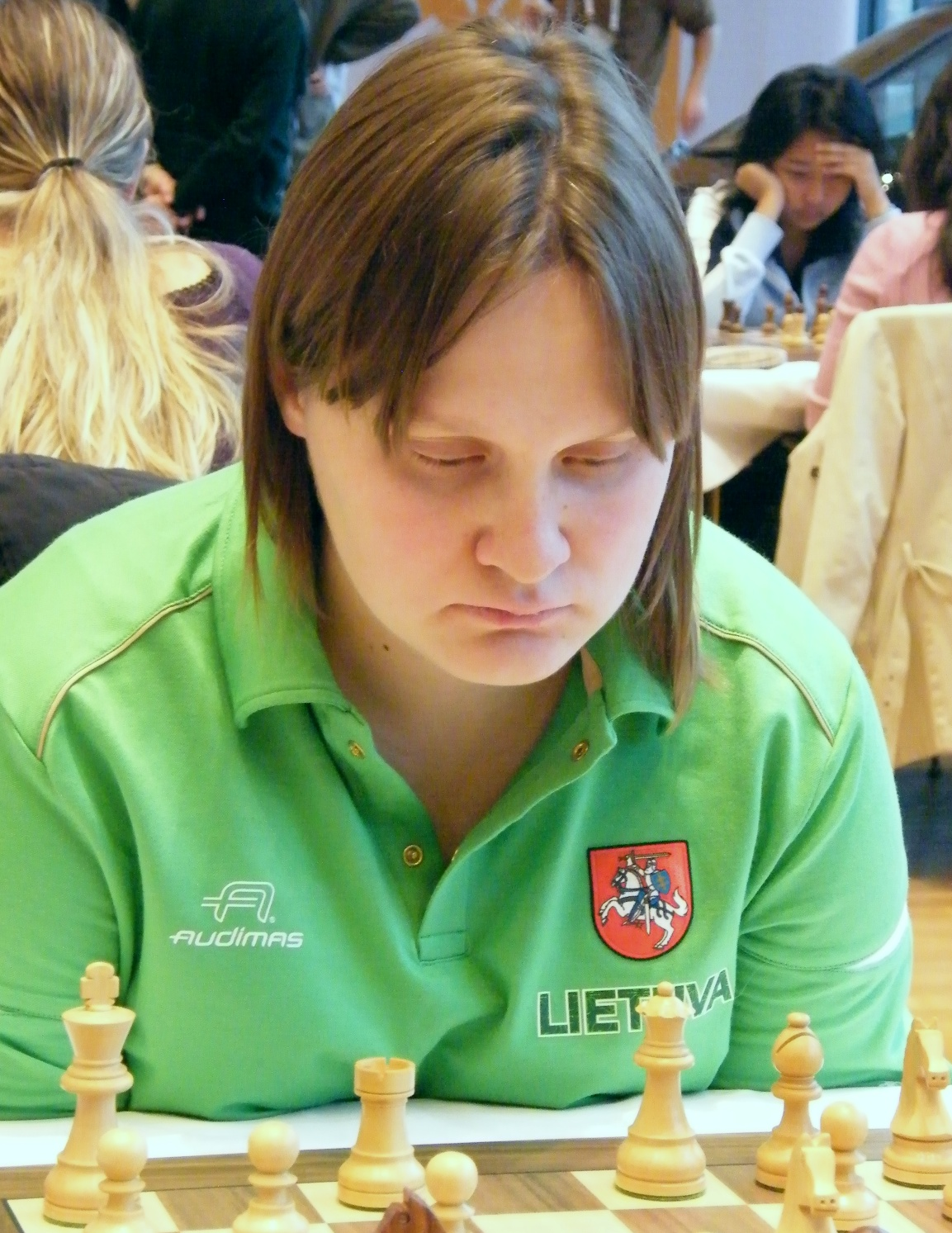
- Živilė Šarakauskienė in 2008

Personal information
- Born: 6 November 1978 (age 47) Panevėžys, Lithuanian SSR, Soviet Union

Chess career
- Country: Lithuania (until 2012); England (since 2012)
- Title: Woman International Master (2005)
- Peak rating: 2226 (October 2007)

Živilė Šarakauskienė (née Čiukšytė, born 6 November 1978) is a Lithuanian chess player who holds the title of Woman International Master (WIM, 2005). She is four time winner of Lithuanian Women's Chess Championship (1998, 2002, 2009, 2011). In 2012 she moved to England and now represents this country in international competitions.

== Biography ==
Živilė Šarakauskienė is multiple medalist of the Lithuanian Women's Chess Championships, in which she won four gold (1998, 2002, 2009, 2011) and bronze (2008) medals.

Živilė Šarakauskienė participated World Girls U-20 Championship in 1998, World Youth Chess Championships in 1992, 1993, 1994 and 1996 (in categories U14, U16 and U18).

She is participant of European Individual Women's Chess Championship in 2001, 2002, 2005 and 2008., European Union Chess Championship in 2006.

Since 2012, she has been a British citizen.

Živilė Šarakauskienė played for Lithuania in the Women's Chess Olympiads:

- In 2002, at second board in the 35th Chess Olympiad (women) in Bled (+3, =3, -4),
- In 2008, at fourth board in the 38th Chess Olympiad (women) in Dresden (+4, =2, -1),
- In 2010, at third board in the 39th Chess Olympiad (women) in Khanty-Mansiysk (+5, =2, -3).

Živilė Šarakauskienė played for England in the European Women's Team Chess Championships:

- In 2015, at fourth board in the 11th European Team Chess Championship (women) in Reykjavík (+3, =1, -3).

With chess club Širvinta Vilkaviškis Živilė Šarakauskienė participated in European Chess Club Cup in 1998, 1999 and 2000. She is member of the Four Nations League team (since 2011) with Guildford A&DC.

Her youngest sister is Lithuanian and English chess Woman Grandmaster Dagnė Čiukšytė. Her husband Gediminas Šarakauskas is chess International Master.
