= Deimantė Cornette =

Lithuanian chess player (born 1989)

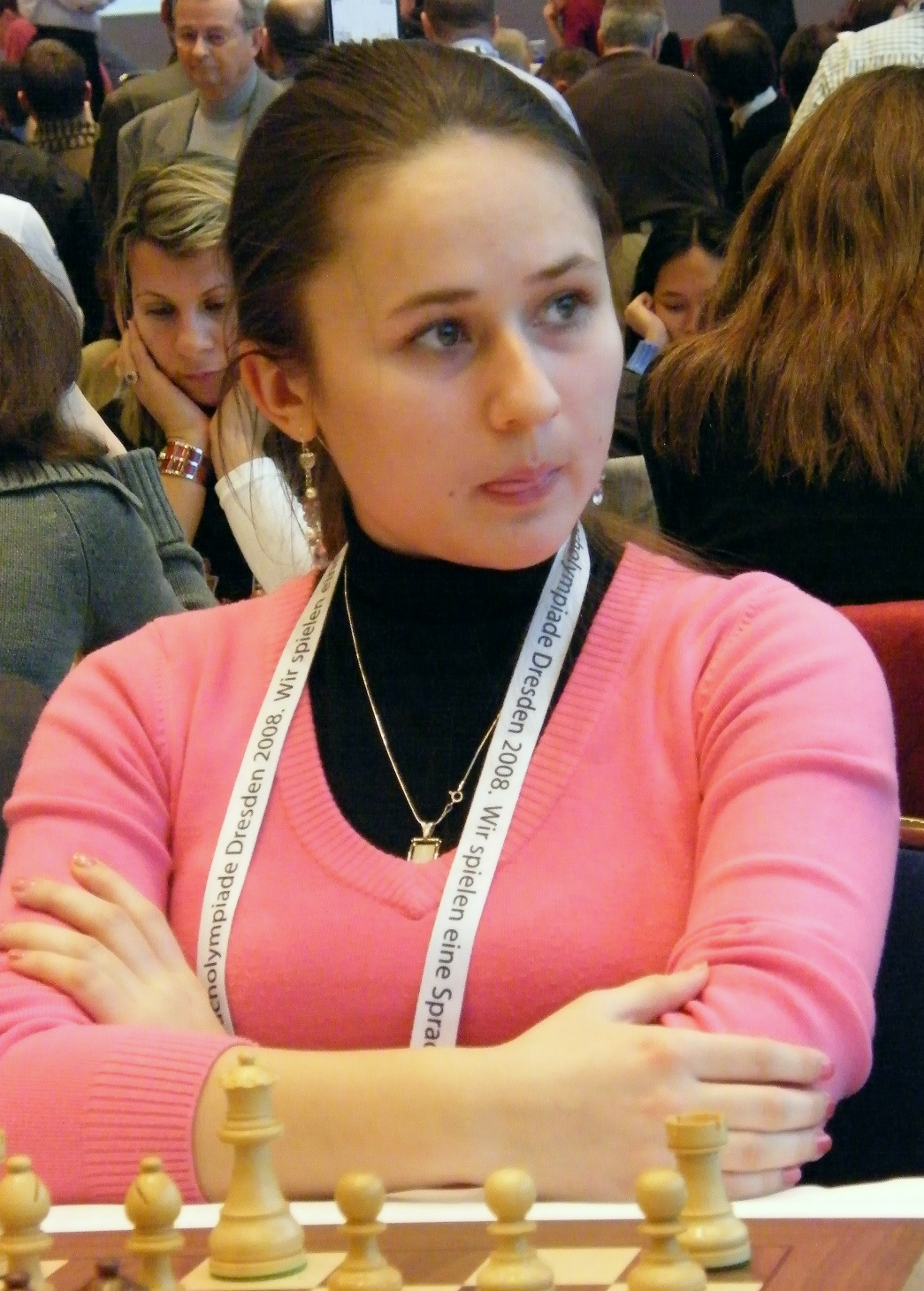
- Deimantė Daulytė, 2008 in Dresden

Personal information
- Born: February 22, 1989 (age 37) Šiauliai, Lithuania
- Spouse: Matthieu Cornette (m. 2016)

Chess career
- Title: International Master (2014); Woman Grandmaster (2009)
- FIDE rating: 2402 (August 2026)
- Peak rating: 2470 (July 2018)

Deimantė Cornette (born Deimantė Daulytė; 22 February 1989, in Šiauliai) is a Lithuanian chess player who holds the FIDE titles of International Master and Woman Grandmaster. She plays for France since 2021.

She won the women's Lithuanian Chess Championship in 2006, 2007, 2008, 2012 and 2013.

In March 2015, Deimantė won the Mediterranean Flower round-robin tournament in Rijeka. In the following month, she competed in the Women's World Chess Championship 2015, where she lost in dramatic style in the 1st round. Her opponent was Monika Soćko. After drawing the first 2 games, it went to a tie-break. Deimante won the first rapid chess game. In the 2nd game of the tie-break, she reached a position where she could checkmate the king in 1 move. Instead of playing the winning move though, she played a move that lost her her queen. As a result, she lost that game. She didn't recover from that, and lost the next 2 games as well.

In the British Four Nations Chess League, Daulytė played in Division 2 in the 2015/16 season and in Division 1 (the highest division) in the 2018/19 season for the Celtic Tigers team, in the 2017 Chinese Team Championship for Chengdu, and in the 2018 Spanish Team Championship for Ajoblanco Extremadura.

In March 2016, Deimantė Daulytė took second place in the Lithuanian women's Elo list behind Viktorija Čmilytė and twelfth place in the overall Lithuanian ranking.

== Family ==
Her spouse is French GM Matthieu Cornette (b. 1985).
