= Vaidas Sakalauskas =

Lithuanian chess player (born 1971)

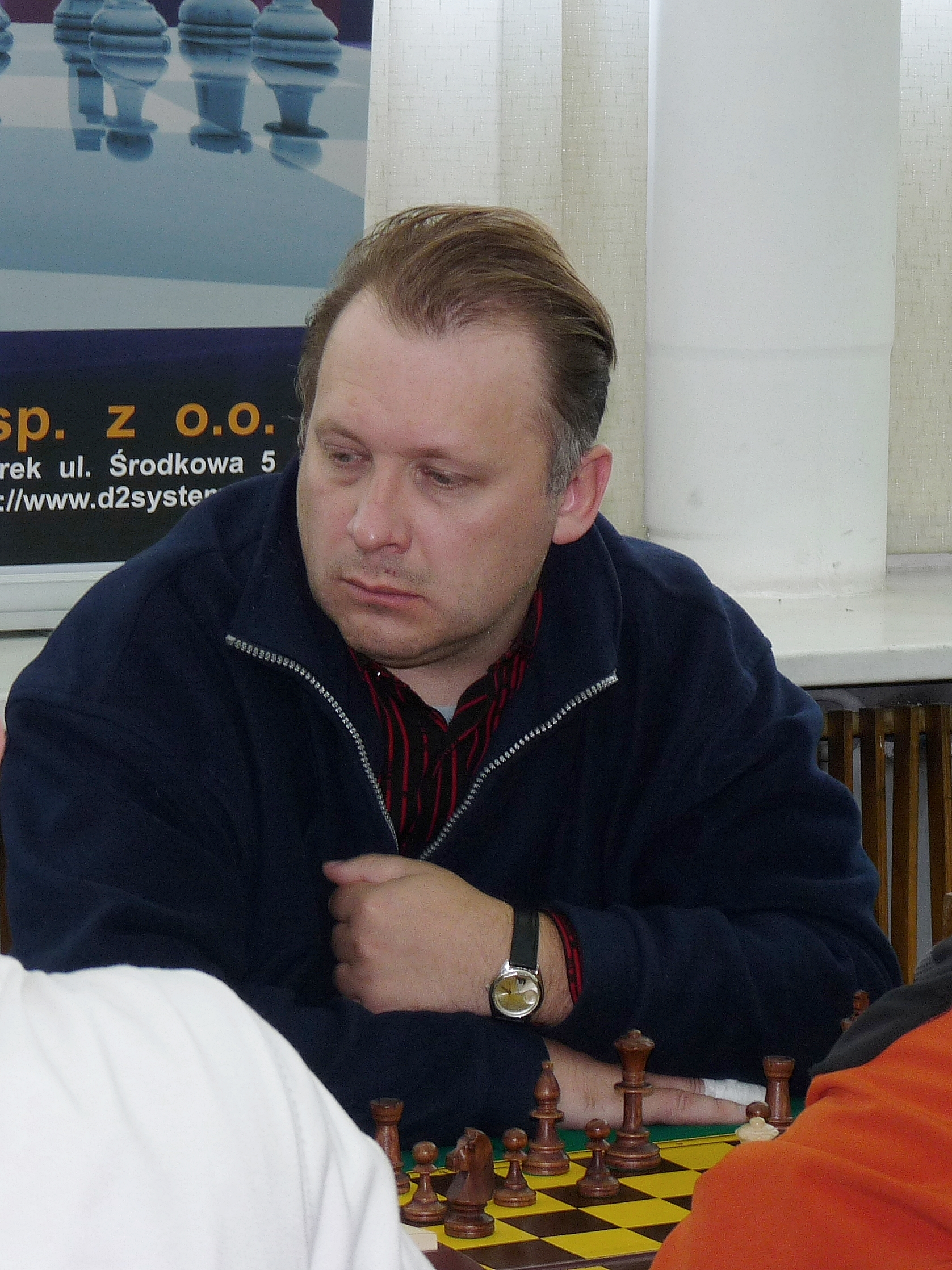
- (2010)

Personal information
- Born: July 2, 1971 (age 55)

Chess career
- Country: Soviet Union; Lithuania
- Title: International Master (1998)
- FIDE rating: 2327 (September 2021)
- Peak rating: 2481 (October 2005)

Vaidas Sakalauskas (born July 2, 1971) is a Lithuanian chess player. He received the FIDE title of International Master in 1998 and won an individual gold medal in 36th Chess Olympiad in 2004.

== Biography ==
Sakalauskas is a graduate of the Faculty of History of the Vilnius Pedagogical University in 1994. From 1994 to 2006 he worked in Radviliškis sports center as chess trainer.

He regularly participated in Lithuanian Chess Championship. His best result is 3rd place 1997, 1999, 2003, 2004, 2005 ir 2011. In 2005 Sakalauskas won blitz tournament in "Liepājas Rokāde".

Sakalauskas played for Lithuania in Chess Olympiads:

- In 1998, at second reserve board in the 33rd Chess Olympiad in Elista (+3 −2 =2);
- In 2000, at third board in the 34th Chess Olympiad in Istanbul (+4 −2 =6);
- In 2002, at second reserve board in the 35th Chess Olympiad in Bled (+4 −2 =0);
- In 2004, at reserve board in the 36th Chess Olympiad in Calvia (+5 −0 =2) and won individual gold medal.

He played for Lithuania in European Team Chess Championships:

- In 1999, at fourth board in the 12th European Team Chess Championship in Batumi (+3 −2 =4);
- In 2003, at second board in the 14th European Team Chess Championship in Plovdiv (+3 −2 =3);
- In 2005, at fourth board in the 15th European Team Chess Championship in Gothenburg (+3 −2 =4);
- In 2011, at third board in the 18th European Team Chess Championship in Porto Carras (+0 −0 =2).
