= Dagnė Čiukšytė =

Lithuanian chess player (born 1977)

Dagne Ciuksyte
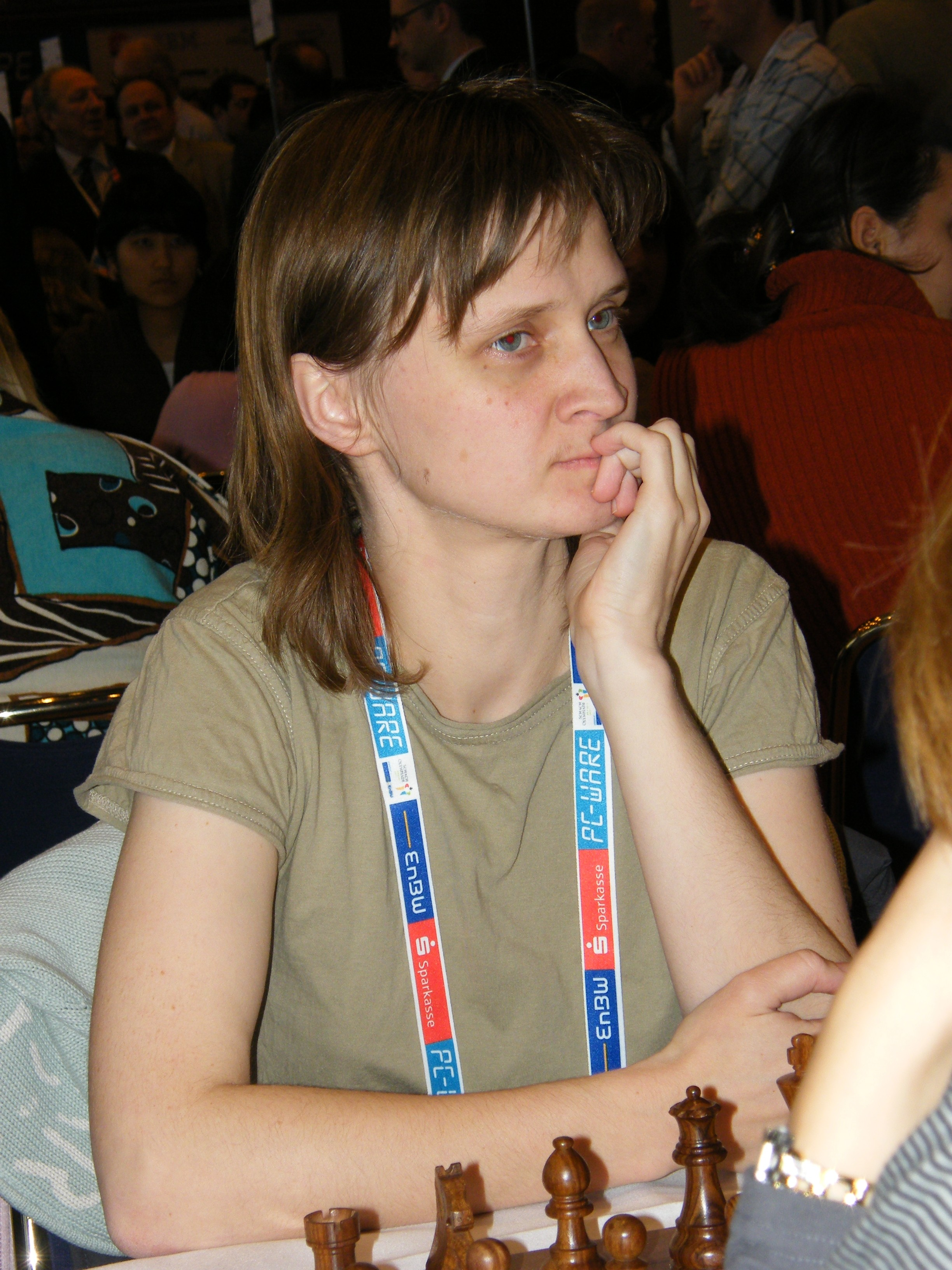
- Dagnė Čiukšytė in 2008

Personal information
- Born: January 1, 1977 (age 49) Panevėžys, Lithuania

Chess career
- Country: Lithuania (until 2007); England (since 2007)
- Title: International Master (2006); Woman Grandmaster (2002)
- Peak rating: 2450 (January 2007)

Dagnė Čiukšytė is a Lithuanian chess player. In 2007 she moved to England and now represents this country in international competitions.

== Career ==
Dagnė Čiukšytė has been a professional chess player since she made her debut in 1994 for Lithuania. In 1994, she went on to win the Lithuanian Women's Championship. She repeated the same feat in 1996, 1997 and in 2003. Čiukšytė also represented Lithuania in five Women's Chess Olympiads from 1994 to 2006. Čiukšytė competed at the 1995 Women's Interzonal Tournament, held in Chişinău, and at the 2001 Women's World Championship.

Čiukšytė competed in the EU Individual Championship in 2006 and finished as the highest ranked female player on 6½ points.

In 1995, she was awarded the title of Woman International Master by FIDE, which was followed by that of Woman Grandmaster in 2002. In 2006 Čiukšytė also received the title of International Master.

She left Lithuania and moved to England to represent the English national chess team. Čiukšytė shared first place with Guliskhan Nakhbayeva at the women's invitational tournament of the 2011 London Chess Classic festival.

== See also ==
- List of female chess players
- List of nationality transfers in chess
