= Max Romih =

Italian chess master

Massimiliano "Massimo" Romi (né Max Romih; 22 May 1893 – 24 April 1979) was an Italian chess master.

Romih was born in Pinguente, Istria (now Buzet), and as a Croatian a citizen of Austria-Hungary, but after World War I the region of Julian March became part of Italy. Soon afterwards, in keeping with its nationalistic ideals, Fascism began to encourage Italianization of foreign or foreign-sounding names and he first became Massimiliano Romih, ultimately dropping the "h" off the end of his name after the San Remo 1930 chess tournament.

He played several times in the Italian Chess Championship, and tied for 5th/6th at Viareggio 1921 (Davide Marotti won), got 2nd at Milan 1931 (behind Stefano Rosselli del Turco), 3rd at Milan 1934 (Mario Monticelli won), shared 2nd place at Florence 1935 (behind Antonio Sacconi). After World War II, he tied for 16th place at Florence 1948, ended 9th at Venice 1951, 3rd at Trieste 1954, and 2nd at Rovigo 1956. Finally, he tied for 12th/15th at Sottomarina (Chioggia) 1970, at the age of 77.

He won at Scarborough 1925, ended 3rd at Hyères 1926 (Abraham Baratz won), tied for 5th/7th at Spa 1926 (Fritz Sämisch and George Alan Thomas won), got 7th at Venice 1929 (Rudolf Pitschak won), 16th at San Remo 1930 (Alexander Alekhine won), 4th at Paris 1938 (José Raúl Capablanca won), and 2nd at Reggio Emilia 1947 (behind Esteban Canal).

Romi played for Italy in unofficial and official Chess Olympiads:

- In 1st unofficial Chess Olympiad at Paris 1924 (+5 –5 =3);
- In 1st Chess Olympiad at London 1927 (+3 –9 =3);
- In 4th Chess Olympiad at Prague 1931 (+5 –10 =3);
- In 6th Chess Olympiad at Warsaw 1935 (+5 –9 =3);
- In 3rd unofficial Chess Olympiad at Munich 1936 (+6 –11 =3).
