= Guido Cappello =

Italian chess player

Personal information
- Born: 14 April 1933 Pisa, Italy
- Died: 17 August 1996 (aged 63) Milan, Italy

Chess career
- Country: Italy

Guido Cappello (14 April 1933 – 17 August 1996) was an Italian chess player, Italian Chess Championship winner (1960).

== Biography ==
Born in Pisa, Guido Cappello moved to Gorizia at a young age, then in the 1960s to Milan. By profession he was an accountant. In the 1960s and 1970s Guido Cappello was one of the strongest Italian chess players. In 1960 he won the Italian Chess Championship in Perugia, ahead to Alberto Giustolisi, Federico Norcia and Enrico Paoli. Guido Cappello was awarded the title of National Chess Master in the same year. In the 1963 Italian Chess Championship in Imperia he still touched the title, ranking on equal points with the winner Ennio Contedini, who prevailed by technical play-off. Guido Cappello later achieved other excellent placings in this tournament: shared 3rd–5th place in 1965, 3rd place in 1967 and 1968, shared 2nd–4th place in 1972. Guido Cappello has had several successes in International Chess Tournaments, ranked 3rd in Savona (1967) and in Milan (1968). In 1964 he took part in the Baku International Chess tournament and scored 5,5 from 11.

Guido Cappello played for Italy in the Chess Olympiads:

- In 1966, at second board in the 17th Chess Olympiad in Havana (+10, =2, -6),
- In 1968, at second board in the 18th Chess Olympiad in Lugano (+5, =3, -7),
- In 1972, at first reserve board in the 20th Chess Olympiad in Skopje (+3, =5, -4),
- In 1974, at second reserve board in the 21st Chess Olympiad in Nice (+4, =3, -4).

Guido Cappello played for Italy in the Clare Benedict Chess Cups:

- In 1961, at first board in the 8th Clare Benedict Chess Cup in Neuhausen (+1, =0, -4),
- In 1964, at second board in the 11th Clare Benedict Chess Cup in Lenzerheide (+1, =1, -3).

Guido Cappello was also a master of correspondence chess, achieving excellent placings in the ASIGC (Italian Association of Correspondence Chess) championships: 2nd place in the 15th championship, 4th place in the 18th, shared 4th-5th place in the 17th and 18th).
