= Danyyil Dvirnyy =

Italian chess grandmaster (born 1990)

- Danyyil Dvirnyy in 2016

Personal information
- Born: 21 October 1990 (age 35) Saint Petersburg, Soviet Union

Chess career
- Country: Italy
- Title: Grandmaster (2014)
- FIDE rating: 2479 (September 2026)
- Peak rating: 2575 (March 2014)

Danyyil Dvirnyy (Russian: Даниил Двирный, Ukrainian: Даніїл Двірний, 21 October 1990) is an Italian chess grandmaster. He is a two time Italian Champion and winner of the Italian Team Chess Championship. He represented Italian Team at Chess Olympiads three times from 2012 to 2016.

== Career ==
Dvirnyy was born in Saint Petersburg in 1990 to Ukrainian parents. He moved to Italy in 2003, only then starting to play chess at a competitive level.

In 2013, Dvirnyy won the Italian Chess Championship for the first time in Rome, where he led Sabino Brunello and Alberto David by one point. He also won the 4th International Chess Festival Forni di Sopra in Forni di Sopra.

In 2015, he won the Italian Team Chess Championship with "Obiettivo Risarcimento Padova", club of Padua, and won the Italian Chess Championship for the second time, winning in the play-offs against Axel Rombaldoni and Alberto David.

In 2018, he won two tournaments of the Italian Rapid Chess Championship in Chianciano Terme, with time controls of 25+5 and 12+3.

== Publications ==
- Dvirnyy, Danyyil; Battistella, Stefano (2022). Il punto di svolta negli scacchi (in Italian). Bologna: Le Due Torri. ISBN 978-8885720558.
