= 1942 European Individual Chess Championship =

European Individual Chess Championship 1942 was chess tournament purporting to be the first European Championship (Europameisterschaft). It was held in Munich, 14–26 September 1942, organised by Ehrhardt Post, the Chief Executive of Nazi Grossdeutscher Schachbund.

But given that players from Germany's enemies (Soviet Union, Great Britain and Poland) were unable to participate (because of World War II), and Jewish players barred (because of Nazi policy), this tournament was simply a manifestation of Nazi propaganda and has never received any form of official recognition as a championship. Reuben Fine commented in Chess Marches On (1945), page 136: "Alekhine has participated in a number of European shindigs, including one so-called 'European Championship' ....his competitors were at best second-rate second-raters." This last opinion is curious as Alekhine (World Champion), Keres (pretendent for the title), Bogoljubow (former World Champion challenger), Stoltz (winner, ahead of Alekhine, at Munich 1941), and Junge (co-winner, with Alekhine, at Prague 1942) made Munich 1942 the world's strongest tournament in 1942. The next-strongest tournaments were Salzburg 1942, New York (US Championship) 1942, Mar del Plata 1942, Prague (Duras Memorial) 1942, and Moscow (Championship) 1942.

== Results ==
The line-up at Munich 1942 was as follows:

| # | Player | 1 | 2 | 3 | 4 | 5 | 6 | 7 | 8 | 9 | 10 | 11 | 12 | Total |
| 1 | Alexander Alekhine (France) | x | 1 | ½ | ½ | 1 | 1 | 1 | 0 | 1 | ½ | 1 | 1 | 8½ |
| 2 | Paul Keres (Estonia) | 0 | x | 1 | ½ | 0 | 1 | ½ | 1 | ½ | 1 | 1 | 1 | 7½ |
| 3 | Jan Foltys (Bohemia and Moravia) | ½ | 0 | x | 1 | ½ | 1 | 0 | ½ | 1 | 1 | ½ | 1 | 7 |
| 4 | Efim Bogoljubow (Germany) | ½ | ½ | 0 | x | 1 | 0 | 1 | 1 | ½ | 1 | ½ | 1 | 7 |
| 5 | Kurt Richter (Germany) | 0 | 1 | ½ | 0 | x | ½ | ½ | 1 | ½ | 1 | 1 | 1 | 7 |
| 6 | Gedeon Barcza (Hungary) | 0 | 0 | 0 | 1 | ½ | x | ½ | 0 | 1 | ½ | 1 | 1 | 5½ |
| 7 | Klaus Junge (Germany) | 0 | ½ | 1 | 0 | ½ | ½ | x | 1 | ½ | 0 | 0 | 1 | 5 |
| 8 | Ludwig Rellstab (Germany) | 1 | 0 | ½ | 0 | 0 | 1 | 0 | x | 0 | ½ | 1 | ½ | 4½ |
| 9 | Gösta Stoltz (Sweden) | 0 | ½ | 0 | ½ | ½ | 0 | ½ | 1 | x | 0 | 0 | 1 | 4 |
| 10 | Ivan Vladimir Rohaček (Slovakia) | ½ | 0 | 0 | 0 | 0 | ½ | 1 | ½ | 1 | x | ½ | 0 | 4 |
| 11 | Mario Napolitano (Italy) | 0 | 0 | ½ | ½ | 0 | 0 | 1 | 0 | 1 | ½ | x | 0 | 3½ |
| 12 | Braslav Rabar (Croatia) | 0 | 0 | 0 | 0 | 0 | 0 | 0 | ½ | 0 | 1 | 1 | x | 2½ |

Wertungsturnier – Qualification Tournament

| # | Player | 1 | 2 | 3 | 4 | 5 | 6 | 7 | 8 | 9 | 10 | 11 | 12 | Total |
| 1 | Gösta Danielsson (Sweden) | x | ½ | 0 | ½ | 1 | 1 | ½ | 1 | 1 | 1 | ½ | 1 | 8 |
| 2 | József Szily (Hungary) | ½ | x | ½ | ½ | ½ | ½ | 1 | 0 | 1 | 1 | ½ | 1 | 7 |
| 3–5 | Hans Müller (Germany) | 1 | ½ | x | ½ | ½ | 1 | ½ | 0 | ½ | ½ | ½ | 1 | 6.5 |
| 3–5 | Géza Füster (Hungary) | ½ | ½ | ½ | x | 1 | 0 | 0 | ½ | 1 | ½ | 1 | 1 | 6.5 |
| 3–5 | Federico Norcia (Italy) | 0 | ½ | ½ | 0 | x | 1 | ½ | ½ | ½ | 1 | 1 | 1 | 6.5 |
| 6 | Vincenzo Nestler (Italy) | 0 | ½ | 0 | 1 | 0 | x | 0 | 1 | 1 | ½ | 1 | 1 | 6 |
| 7–8 | Alexander Tsvetkov (Bulgaria) | ½ | 0 | ½ | 1 | ½ | 1 | x | ½ | 0 | ½ | 1 | 0 | 5.5 |
| 7–8 | Sergiu Samarian (Romania) | 0 | 1 | 1 | ½ | ½ | 0 | ½ | x | 0 | 1 | 0 | 1 | 5.5 |
| 9 | Mladen Šubarić (Croatia) | 0 | 0 | ½ | 0 | ½ | 0 | 1 | 1 | x | 0 | 1 | 1 | 5 |
| 10 | Carl Ahues (Germany) | 0 | 0 | ½ | ½ | 0 | ½ | ½ | 0 | 1 | x | ½ | 1 | 4.5 |
| 11 | Charles Roele (Netherlands) | ½ | ½ | ½ | 0 | 0 | 0 | 0 | 1 | 0 | ½ | x | 1 | 4 |
| 12 | Olof Kinnmark (Sweden) | 0 | 0 | 0 | 0 | 0 | 0 | 1 | 0 | 0 | 0 | 0 | x | 1 |

Two books have appeared to date on this event. They are: Europa-Schach-Rundschau: Band 1 Europameisterschaft Munchen 1942 by Alfred Brinckmann (probably published 1943), and A müncheni sakkmesterverseny Európa bajnokságáért 1942 (Kecskemét 1942) by Gedeon Barcza. The games of the second group (Wertungsturnier – Qualification Tournament) were, in the main, published in a small booklet by Erich Friebel, published in Bruck an der Leitha in 1990.
