= Cherubino Staldi =

Italian chess player

Personal information
- Born: 11 March 1911 Trieste, Italy
- Died: 28 June 2002 (aged 91)

Chess career
- Country: Italy

Cherubino Staldi (11 March 1911 – 28 June 2002) was an Italian chess master, Italian Chess Championship winner (1947).

== Biography ==
Cherubino Staldi participated in several Italian Chess Championships. In 1935, in Florence he shared 6th – 7th place with Mario Napolitano and obtained the title of National Chess Master. In 1947, in Rome Staldi shared 1st – 2nd place with Vincenzo Castaldi. Both chess players were declared as Italian chess champions. In 1954, in Trieste he shared 1st – 2nd place with Vincenzo Nestler but loss play-off match with 2:5 (+1, =2, –4).

Cherubino Staldi played for Italy in the Chess Olympiad:

- In 1937, at fourth board in the 7th Chess Olympiad in Stockholm (+5, =2, -7).

Cherubino Staldi played for Italy in the unofficial Chess Olympiad:

- In 1936, at first reserve board in the 3rd unofficial Chess Olympiad in Munich (+5, =3, -5).
