= Rita Gramignani =

Italian chess player

Personal information
- Born: October 12, 1943 (age 82) La Spezia, Italia

Chess career
- Country: Italy

Rita Gramignani (born 12 October 1943) is an Italian chess player. She is a nine-time winner the Italian Women's Chess Championship (1973, 1975, 1976, 1980, 1983, 1987, 1989, 1991, 1992).

== Biography ==
From the 1970s to the 1990s, Rita Gramignani was one of the leading Italian women's chess players. She nine times won the Italian Women's Chess Championships in 1973, 1975, 1976, 1980, 1983, 1987, 1989, 1991 and 1992. Only Stefano Tatai between Italian chess players has more victories in Italian Chess Championship - 12. In 1976, Rita Gramignani participated at Women's World Chess Championship Interzonal Tournament in Rozendaal and ranked 14th place.

Rita Gramignani played for Italy in the Women's Chess Olympiads:

- In 1976, at first board in the 7th Chess Olympiad (women) in Haifa (+4, =5, -2),
- In 1980, at second board in the 9th Chess Olympiad (women) in Valletta (+3, =2, -3),
- In 1984, at second board in the 26th Chess Olympiad (women) in Thessaloniki (+3, =6, -2),
- In 1988, at first board in the 28th Chess Olympiad (women) in Thessaloniki (+5, =3, -2),
- In 1990, at second board in the 29th Chess Olympiad (women) in Novi Sad (+7, =2, -3),
- In 1994, at first reserve board in the 31st Chess Olympiad (women) in Moscow (+2, =4, -4),
- In 1996, at first board in the 32nd Chess Olympiad (women) in Yerevan (+3, =3, -3).

In 2000, she received the AMIS (Associazione Maestri Italiani di Scacchi) Gioacchino Greco award - A life for chess. In 2016, mayor of La Spezia Massimo Federici gave Rita Gramignani a parchment in recognition of the very high results achieved.
