= Luca Moroni =

Italian chess grandmaster (born 2000)

- Luca Moroni in 2026

Personal information
- Born: 1 July 2000 (age 26) Desio, Italy

Chess career
- Country: Italy
- Title: Grandmaster (2017)
- FIDE rating: 2551 (November 2026)
- Peak rating: 2601 (January 2024)

Luca Moroni Jr. (born 1 July 2000) is an Italian chess grandmaster. He is a four-time Italian Champion, winning in 2017, 2022, 2023 and 2025, and winner of chess' Mitropa Cup in 2021. He represented Italian Team at Chess Olympiads in 2016, 2018 and 2022 and at Online Chess Olympiads in 2020.

== Career ==
Moroni was born in Desio, a town near Milan. He learned playing chess at 6, won the silver medal at World Youth Championship in Under-16 category in 2015 and earned the title of International Master at 16 in 2016.

In 2015, he achieved his first grandmaster norm at Italian Chess Championship. In December he played a simul with 120 games, overtaking the former national record of Italian Grandmaster Sergio Mariotti.

In 2016, he took part in his first Chess Olympiad in Baku, where he achieved his second grandmaster norm. He earned the title of Grandmaster in August, going beyond 2,500 Elo points.

In 2017, he won the Italian Chess Championship in Cosenza at 17, becoming the youngest Italian Chess Champion after Fabiano Caruana, who earned the title at 15 in 2007.

In 2018, he was 1st at European Individual Rapid Championship in Skopje, but finished 4th for tiebreak criteria. He was on 2nd place at World Youth Championship in Porto Carras in Under 18 category, but 4th for tiebreak.
