= Alvise Zichichi =

Italian chess player (1938–2003)

Personal information
- Born: 4 July 1938 Milan, Italy
- Died: 21 June 2003 (aged 64) Rome, Italy

Chess career
- Country: Italy
- Title: International Master (1977)
- Peak rating: 2405 (January 1986)

Alvise Zichichi (4 July 1938 – 21 June 2003) was an Italian chess International Master (IM) (1977), Italian Chess Championship winner (1984).

== Biography ==
From the mid-1960s to the mid-1980s Alvise Zichichi was one of the strongest Italian chess players. He won three medals in Italian Chess Championship: gold (1984) and two bronze (1973, 1985). Alvise Zichichi also won Italian Senior Chess Championship (S60) in 2000.

Alvise Zichichi has had several successes in International Chess Tournaments, shared 3rd place in Reggio Emilia chess tournament (1969/70), shared 1st place in Reggio Emilia (1974/75), shared 3rd-4th place in Rome (1976), shared 3rd-5th place in Eksjö (1976), 1st place in Catanzaro (1979) and shared 3rd-5th place in Athens (1979).

Alvise Zichichi played for Italy in the Chess Olympiads:

- In 1966, at third board in the 17th Chess Olympiad in Havana (+9, =7, -1),
- In 1968, at third board in the 18th Chess Olympiad in Lugano (+9, =6, -1),
- In 1970, at fourth board in the 19th Chess Olympiad in Siegen (+8, =4, -3),
- In 1974, at first reserve board in the 21st Chess Olympiad in Nice (+1, =0, -5),
- In 1980, at second board in the 24th Chess Olympiad in La Valletta (+3, =4, -2),
- In 1984, at fourth board in the 26th Chess Olympiad in Thessaloniki (+5, =4, -2),
- In 1986, at second reserve board in the 27th Chess Olympiad in Dubai (+2, =0, -2).

Alvise Zichichi played for Italy in the Clare Benedict Cup:

- In 1973, at third board in the 20th Clare Benedict Chess Cup in Gstaad (+0, =3, -2).

Alvise Zichichi was the organizer of many chess tournaments, include eleven editions of international tournaments in Rome. In 1996–2002 he was the president of the Italian Chess Federation. For many years Alvise Zichichi was also the editor of the Italian magazine Scacchitalia.
