= Davide Marotti =

Italian chess player

Davide Marotti (1 January 1881, in Naples – 18 July 1940) was an Italian chess master.

He was a professor of literature and philosophy. In 1911, he took 5th in Rome (Matteo Gladig won). In 1919, he won in Naples. In 1920, he took 2nd, behind Stefano Rosselli del Turco, in Viareggio. In 1920, he took 2nd, behind Rosselli, in Genoa (Quadrangular).

In 1921, Marotti won the first Italian Championship in Viareggio. In 1922, he took 16th (i.e. last place) in London (José Raúl Capablanca won), but had a fine win against Eugene Znosko-Borovsky. In 1923, he was Sub-Champion in Naples (2nd ITA-ch). Marotti lost a match for the title to Rosselli (+2 –6 =5). In 1923, he took 11th in Triest (Paul Johner won). In 1927, he took 3rd in Naples (Rosselli won). In 1928, he tied for 4-5th in Perugia. In 1928, he played for Italy in the 2nd Chess Olympiad at The Hague (+3 –7 =2). In 1929, he took 11th in Venice (Rudolf Pitschak won). In 1930, he took 3rd in Florence (Rosselli won).

In 1937, he took 9th in Naples (8th ITA-ch). The event was won by Vincenzo Castaldi. In 1938, he took 3rd in Savona (Castaldi won). In 1939, he tied for 11-12th in Rome (9th ITA-ch). The event was won by Mario Monticelli.
