= Mario Napolitano =

Italian chess player

Personal information
- Born: 10 February 1910 Acquaviva delle Fonti, Italy
- Died: 31 October 1995 (aged 85) Florence, Italy

Chess career
- Country: Italy
- Title: ICCF Grandmaster (1959)
- ICCF rating: 2195 (July 1992)

Mario Nicola Napolitano (10 February 1910, in Acquaviva delle Fonti – 31 October 1995, in Florence) was an Italian chess master.

At the beginning of his career, Napolitano took 5th place in Venice in 1928. Then, he won in Milan in 1934. He had played many times in the Italian championships and local tournaments – before, during and after World War II. In 1935, he took 6th in Florence (6th ITA-ch; Antonio Sacconi won). In 1938, he tied for 4th-6th in Savona (Vincenzo Castaldi won). In 1938, he won in Milan. In 1939, he tied for 3rd-4th in Rome (9th ITA-ch; Mario Monticelli won). In 1942, Napolitano took 11th in Munich (1st European championship). The event was won by Alexander Alekhine. In 1943, he took 2nd, behind Vincenzo Nestler, in Florence (10th ITA-ch).

Napolitano was also a leading correspondence chess player of the 1940s and 1950s. In 1953, Mario Napolitano finished 2nd-3rd with Harald Malmgren, behind Cecil Purdy, in the 1st World Correspondence Chess Championship. He took 7th in the 2nd WCC (1956-1959), and 5th in the 3rd WCC (1959-1962).

Awarded the International Correspondence Chess Grandmaster title.
