= Lorenzo Lodici =

Italian chess grandmaster (born 2000)

- Lodici in 2026

Personal information
- Born: 16 April 2000 (age 26) Brescia, Italy

Chess career
- Country: Italy
- Title: Grandmaster (2021)
- FIDE rating: 2565 (November 2026)
- Peak rating: 2601 (April 2026)

Lorenzo Lodici (born 16 April 2000) is an Italian chess grandmaster. He won the Italian Chess Championship in 2018 and the Mitropa Cup in 2021. He has represented Italy at three Olympiads (2020, 2022, and 2024).

== Career ==
Lodici was born in Brescia, but he grew up in Chioggia, a town near Venice. After gaining the title of International Master in 2016, he won the Italian Junior Championship in Cosenza in 2017.

In 2018, he won the Italian Chess Championship for the first time in Salerno, defeating the Grandmaster Alberto David in the play-offs by 2-0. Here he earned the first Grandmaster norm.

In 2021, he got the other two norms, gaining the Grandmaster title. The first at the Festival Holiday La Marca Open in Villorba in June, the second at Italian Team Chess Championship in Montesilvano in September. In April he won the Mitropa Cup with the Italian Team, playing in reserve board. He scored 4.5 out of 7 points.

In 2022, he participated at his first Chess Olympiad in Chennai, where he obtained the 19th performance rating in 3rd board, defeating the Norwegian Super GM Jon Ludvig Hammer and drawing against the Indian child prodigy R Praggnanandhaa.

In 2024, at his second Chess Olympiad, he defeated Super GMs Anish Giri and Peter Leko.

In 2025, at the Chess World Cup 2025 he defeated higher-rated grandmasters Hans Niemann in the second round and Michael Adams in the third round, before being knocked out by Samuel Sevian in the fourth during the tiebreaks.
