= Italian Chess Championship =

National chess championship

The Italian Chess Federation (Italian: Federazione Scacchistica Italiana (FSI)) was established in 1920. The first Italian Chess Championship took place at Viareggio 1921.

The 1998 Championship was held 21–29 November in Saint-Vincent. The ten-player field had an average Elo rating of 2390. GM Igor Efimov won the round-robin tournament with 6.5/9, a half point ahead of GM Michele Godena and IM Bruno Belotti.

== National Tournaments (unofficial championships) ==
Year	City	Winner	Tournament
1875	Rome	Pietro Seni	I Torneo Nazionale
1878	Livorno	Luigi Sprega	II Torneo Nazionale
1881	Milan	Carlo Salvioli	III Torneo Nazionale
1883	Venice	Fermo Zannoni	IV Torneo Nazionale
1886	Rome	Fermo Zannoni	V Torneo Nazionale
1892	Turin	Vittorio Torre	VI Torneo Nazionale
1900	Rome	Arturo Reggio	I Torneo dell'USI
1901	Venice	Arturo Reggio	II Torneo dell'USI
1905	Florence	Arturo Reggio	III Torneo dell'USI
1906	Milan	Giovanni Martinolich	IV Torneo dell'USI
1911	Rome	Matteo Gladig	V Torneo dell'USI
1912	Viareggio	Alberto Batori	1°Torneo "L'Italia Scacchistica"
1913	Bologna	Arturo Reggio	2°Torneo "L'Italia Scacchistica"
1916	Milan	Arturo Reggio	1°Torneo Nazionale "Crespi"
1919	Milan	Stefano Rosselli del Turco	2°Torneo Nazionale "Crespi"
1920	Viareggio	Stefano Rosselli del Turco	3°Torneo "L'Italia Scacchistica"
1922	Milan	Stefano Rosselli del Turco	3°Torneo Nazionale "Crespi"

== Italian Championships ==
Year	City	Winner
1921	Viareggio	Davide Marotti
1923	Naples	Stefano Rosselli del Turco
1929	Florence	Mario Monticelli
1931	Milan	Stefano Rosselli del Turco
1934	Milan	Mario Monticelli
1935	Florence	Antonio Sacconi
1936	Florence	Vincenzo Castaldi
1937	Naples	Vincenzo Castaldi
1939	Rome	Mario Monticelli
1943	Florence	Vincenzo Nestler
1947	Rome	Vincenzo Castaldi; Cherubino Staldi
1948	Florence	Vincenzo Castaldi
1950	Sorrento	Giorgio Porreca
1951	Venice	Enrico Paoli
1952	Ferrara	Vincenzo Castaldi; Alberto Mario Giustolisi; Federico Norcia
1953	Florence	Vincenzo Castaldi
1954	Triest	Vincenzo Nestler
1956	Rovigo	Giorgio Porreca
1957	Reggio Emilia	Enrico Paoli
1959	Rimini	Vincenzo Castaldi
1960	Perugia	Guido Cappello
1961	San Benedetto del Tronto	Alberto Mario Giustolisi
1962	Forte dei Marmi	Stefano Tatai
1963	Imperia	Ennio Contedini
1964	Naples	Alberto Mario Giustolisi
1965	Florence	Stefano Tatai
1966	Rovigo	Alberto Mario Giustolisi
1967	Savona	Stefano Tatai
1968	Milan	Enrico Paoli
1969	San Benedetto del Tronto	Sergio Mariotti
1970	Chioggia	Stefano Tatai
1971	San Benedetto del Tronto	Sergio Mariotti
1972	Recoaro Terme	Carlo Micheli
1973	Sottomarina Lido	Carlo Micheli
1974	Castelvecchio Pascoli	Stefano Tatai
1975	Pesaro	Bela Toth
1976	Castelvecchio Pascoli	Bela Toth
1977	Castelvecchio Pascoli	Stefano Tatai
1979	Venice	Stefano Tatai
1980	Agnano	Bela Toth
1981	Barcellona Pozzo di Gotto	Roberto Messa
1982	Arco	Bela Toth
1983	Arco	Stefano Tatai
1984	Arcidosso	Alvise Zichichi
1985	Chianciano	Stefano Tatai
1986	Cesenatico	Fernando Braga
1987	Chianciano	Mario Lanzani
1988	Chianciano	Fernando Braga
1989	Chianciano	Bruno Belotti
1990	Chianciano	Stefano Tatai
1991	Chianciano	Stefano Tatai
1992/93	Reggio Emilia	Michele Godena
1994	Filettino	Michele Godena
1994/95	Reggio Emilia	Stefano Tatai
1995	Verona	Michele Godena
1996	Mantua	Bruno Belotti
1997/98	Reggio Emilia	Igor Efimov
1998	Saint-Vincent	Igor Efimov
1999	Saint-Vincent	Fabio Bellini
2000	Saint-Vincent	Ennio Arlandi
2001	Montecatini Terme	Bruno Belotti
2002	Montecatini Terme	Duilio Collutiis
2003	Arvier	Spartaco Sarno
2004	Montecatini Terme	Fabio Bruno
2005	Cremona	Michele Godena
2006	Cremona	Michele Godena
2007	Martina Franca	Fabiano Caruana
2008	Martina Franca	Fabiano Caruana
2009	Sarre	Lexy Ortega
2010	Siena	Fabiano Caruana
2011	Perugia	Fabiano Caruana
2012	Turin	Alberto David
2013	Rome	Danyyil Dvirnyy
2014	Boscotrecase	Axel Rombaldoni
2015	Milan	Danyyil Dvirnyy
2016	Rome	Alberto David
2017	Cosenza	Luca Moroni
2018	Salerno	Lorenzo Lodici
2019	Padua	Alberto David
2020	online	Alessio Valsecchi
2021	Chianciano Terme	Pier Luigi Basso
2022	Cagliari	Luca Moroni
2023	Brescia	Luca Moroni
2024	Turin	Francesco Sonis
2025	Spilimbergo	Luca Moroni

#	Year	City	Women's Winner
1	1938	Milan	Clarice Benini
2	1939	Rome	Clarice Benini
3	1973	Coloretta di Zeri	Rita Gramignani
4	1974	Coloretta di Zeri	Barbara Pernici
5	1975	Valenza Po	Rita Gramignani
6	1976	Bari	Rita Gramignani
7	1977	Cattolica	Barbara Pernici
8	1978	Latina	Barbara Pernici
9	1979	Bratto	Barbara Pernici
10	1980	Latina	Rita Gramignani
11	1981	Amelia	Barbara Pernici
12	1983	Turin	Rita Gramignani
13	1985	Milan	Gisella Facchini
14	1987	Aosta	Rita Gramignani
15	1988	Aosta	Ada Paizis
16	1989	Aosta	Rita Gramignani
17	1990	Aosta	Giuliana Fittante
18	1991	Gorgonzola	Rita Gramignani
19	1992	Formia	Rita Gramignani
20	1993	Formia	Giusy Parrino
21	1994	Formia	Alessandra Riegler
22	1995	Formia	Alessandra Riegler
23	1996	Mantua	Alessandra Riegler
24	1997	Porto San Giorgio	Veronika Goi
25	1998	Cesenatico	Alessandra Riegler
26	1999	Porto San Giorgio	Sonia Sirletti
27	2000	Imperia	Giuliana Fittante
28	2001	Imperia	Alba Decataldo
29	2002	Bratto	Laura Costantini
30	2003	Bratto	Maria De Rosa
31	2004	Bratto	Maria Santurbano
32	2005	Bratto	Eleonora Ambrosi
33	2006	Bratto	Roberta Brunello
34	2007	Fiuggi	Fiammetta Panella
35	2008	Bratto	Marina Brunello
36	2009	Bratto	Marianna Chierici
37	2010	Bratto	Maria De Rosa
38	2011	Montecatini Terme	Roberta Messina
39	2012	Acqui Terme	Tea Gueci
40	2013	Porto San Giorgio	Maria De Rosa
41	2014	Fano	Alessia Santeramo
42	2015	Giovinazzo	Daniela Movileanu
43	2016	Perugia	Daniela Movileanu
44	2017	Cosenza	Olga Zimina
45	2018	Salerno	Marina Brunello
46	2019	Padua	Elena Sedina
nv	2020	online	Olga Zimina
47	2021	Chianciano Terme	Elena Sedina
48	2022	Cagliari	Olga Zimina
48	2023	Brescia	Olga Zimina
49	2024	Turin	Marina Brunello
50	2025	Spilimbergo	Olga Zimina
