= Nicolas Engalicev =

Chess player

Personal information
- Born: Николай Николаевич Енгалычев; February 18, 1915 Saint Petersburg, Russia
- Died: 1981

Chess career
- Country: Latvia; Italy; Canada

Nicolas Engalicev (18 February 1915 – 1981) was a Latvian–Italian–Canadian chess player. He won the Roma championship in 1947 and the Quebec championship in 1958. He was also Latvian (1943) and Italian (1950) chess championships medalist.

== Biography ==
Engalicev was born in a Russian aristocratic family. His father was knyaz Nikolai Engalicev (Николай Николаевич Енгалычев, 1878–1932/3) and mother was Anastasia Engalicev (Анастасия Андреевна Енгалычева, 1892–1955). After the October Revolution, his mother moved to Latvia with the children, but their father remained in Soviet Russia. He was repressed and at the early 1930s died in Solovki prison camp.

In 1933 Engalicev graduated from a Russian gymnasium in Riga. In 1934 he started study in the engineering faculty of the University of Latvia where he studied intermittently until 1942. In 1937 he participated in the Sixth Latvian Chess Congress where shared the 6th-7th place in one of subdivisions. In 1938–1939 he served in the Latvian Army. In the summer of 1939, he married Latvian National Ballet soloist Vera Jacobi (Вера Петровна Якоби, 1910–2004), and on the same day his brother Andrew married Vera Jakobi sister Anna. Soon after the wedding Andrew with his wife went to work as an engineer of the Belgian Congo and successfully escaped from the World War II in Europe. After Soviet occupation of Latvia in 1940 Soviet authorities repressed Nicolas wife's Vera father, famous Latvian lawyer Pyotr Jacobi (Петр Николаевич Якоби, 1877–1941). During the war disintegrated Nicolas and Vera marriage, later Vera appeared on the scene with his mother's surname Likhacova (Лихачёва). In 1943 Nicolas Engalicev won Riga city blitz championship. He also successfully participated in the Latvian Chess Championship, which for a long time occupied the second place, but only two losses at the finish makes divided 3rd-6th position with Leonids Dreibergs, Lūcijs Endzelīns and Augusts Strautmanis (tournament won Igor Zhdanov).

After World War II Nicolas Engalicev lived in Rome. He graduated from engineering faculty of the Sapienza University of Rome. He worked for the World Council of Churches as immigration Manager and also helped many Eastern Europe emigrants who left through Italy to other countries. In 1947 he won the Rome city chess championship. In two years in a row he was the second in Venice national chess tournaments (1947, 1948). In 1950 Sorrento Nicolas Engalicev won 2nd place in the Italian Chess Championship. All during the tournament, he was the leader, but the loss of the penultimate round of the tournament the winner Giorgio Porreca refused to take first place. In November 1957, when the Riga chess player team visited Italy and competed with Rome's chess team, Nicolas Engalicev losses two parties against Aivars Gipslis.

At the beginning of 1958 Nicolas Engalicev moved to Canada: at first to Toronto and later to Montreal. In Canada he also continued to successfully participated in chess tournaments by the late 1970s. In 1958 he won the Quebec chess championship. He died in 1981.
