= Giustolisi =

Giustolisi is an Italian surname. Notable people with the surname include:

- Alberto Mario Giustolisi (1928–1990), Italian chess player
- Luca Giustolisi (born 1970), Italian former water polo player
