= Jean-Luc Chabanon =

French chess grandmaster (born 1971)

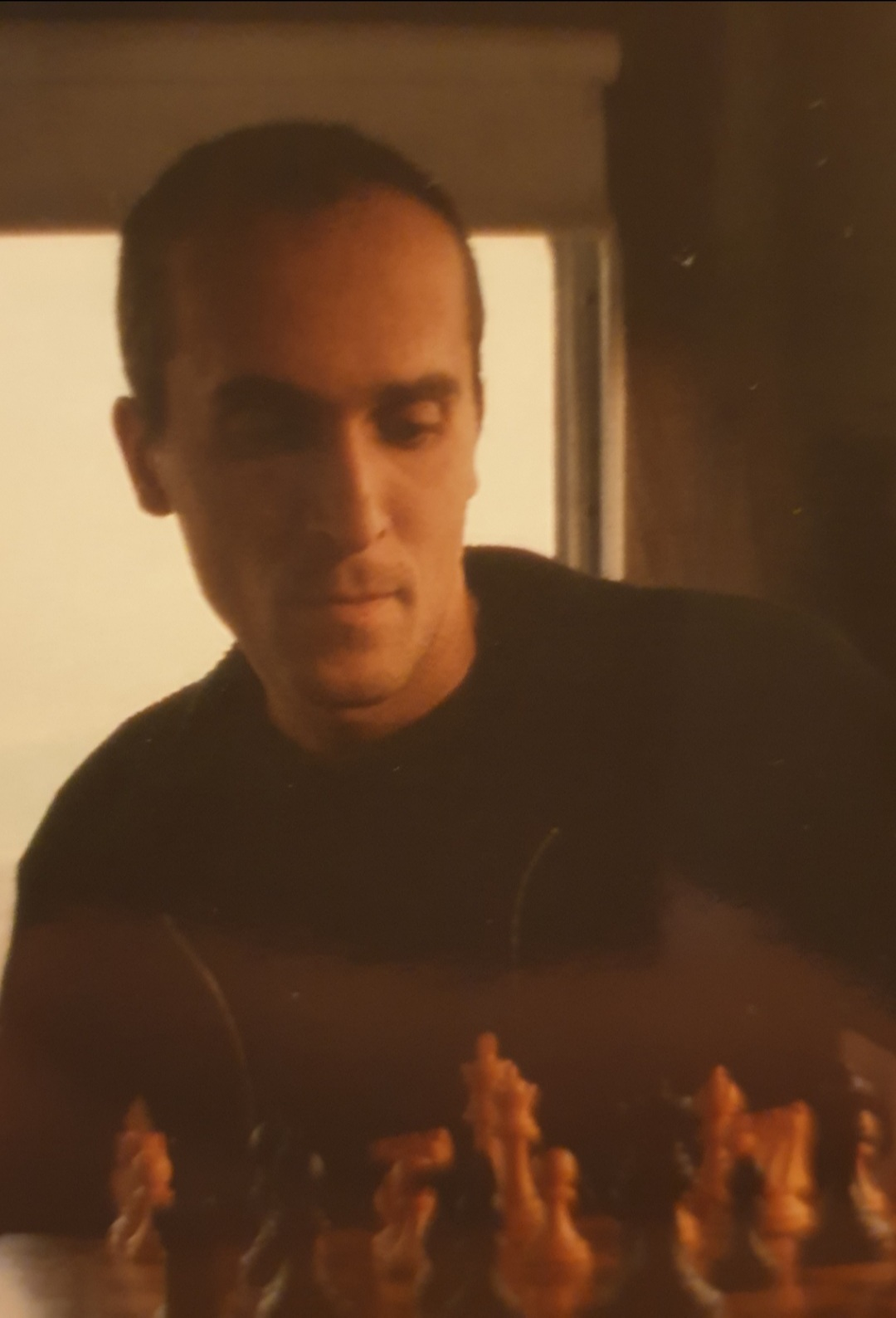
- Chabanon in 2000

Personal information
- Born: August 13, 1971 (age 54) Clermont-Ferrand, France

Chess career
- Country: France
- Title: Grandmaster (2001)
- Peak rating: 2511 (July 2001)

Jean-Luc Chabanon is a French chess grandmaster.

== Chess career ==
In 1990, Chabanon played for France at the 29th Chess Olympiad.

In July 2002, Chabanon finished third in the Paris Chess Championship.

Chabanon won the 2002-03 edition of the Reggio Emilia chess tournament.

In February 2015, Chabanon finished second in the Clermont-Ferrand International Chess Tournament, behind winner Jean-Pierre Le Roux and ahead of Kamran Shirazi and Anthony Kosten on tiebreaks.

In the first round of the 2022 French League, Chabanon blundered a winning position into a stalemate against FIDE Master Floryan Eugène.
