= Fernando Braga =

Argentine-Italian chess player (born 1958)

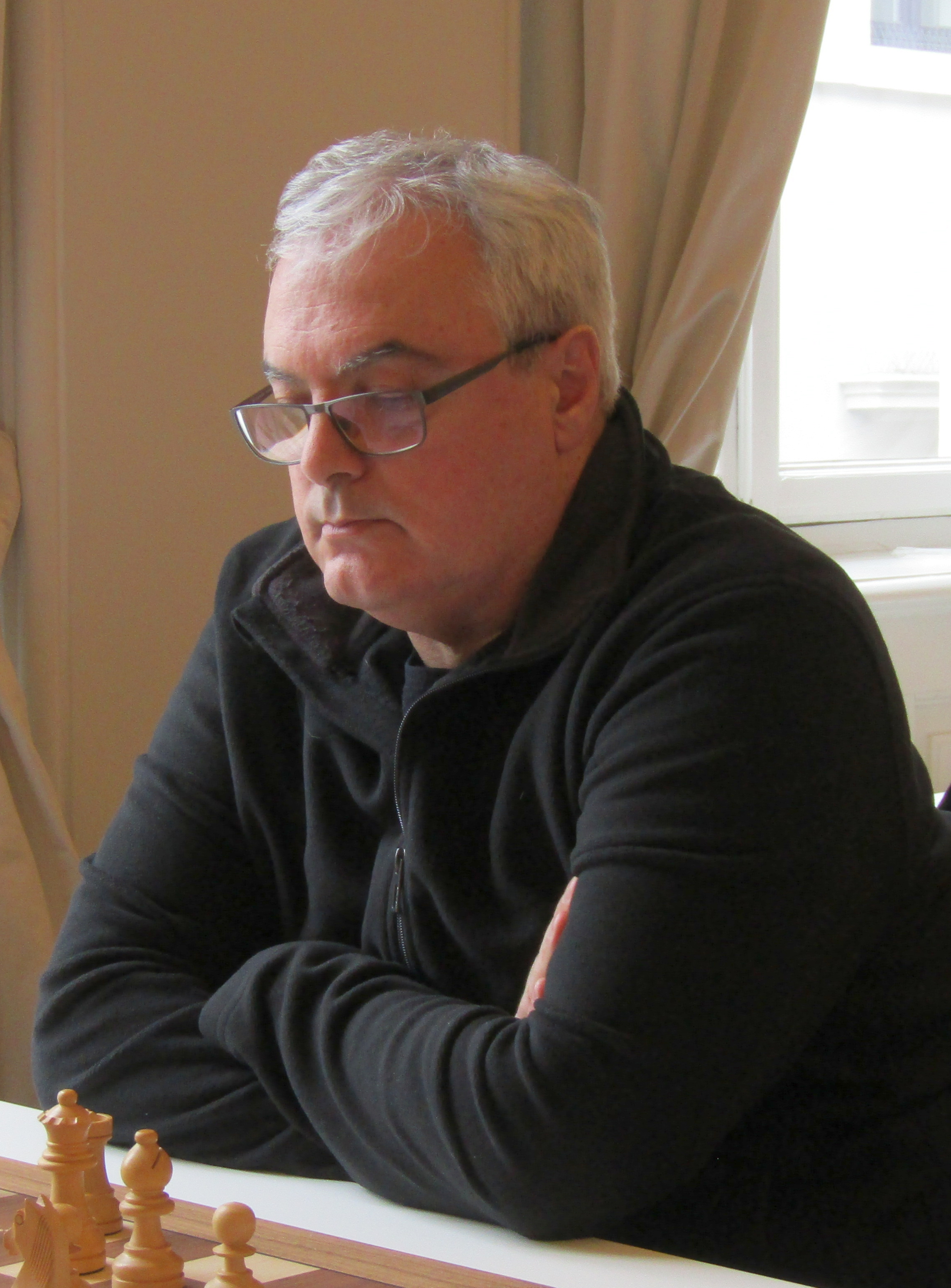
- Fernando Braga in 2017

Personal information
- Born: 9 July 1958 (age 68) Buenos Aires, Argentina

Chess career
- Country: Argentina (until 1984); Italy (since 1984)
- Title: International Master (1983)
- FIDE rating: 2404 (July 2026)
- Peak rating: 2480 (July 1986)

Fernando Alberto Braga (born 9 July 1958), is an Argentine and Italian (from 1984) chess International Master (IM) (1983), two-time Italian Chess Championship winner (1986, 1988).

== Biography ==
In the end of 1970s Fernando Braga was one of Argentina's leading junior chess players. In 1977, he won silver medal in Argentine Chess Junior Championship. In 1980, Fernando Braga participated in the Argentine Chess Championship final and ranked in 12th place.

Since 1984 Fernando Braga has been living in Italy. He won three medals of the Italian Chess Championships: two gold (1986, 1988) and a bronze (2002). He was participant in a number of strong international chess tournaments. Fernando Braga won Zaragoza Chess tournament (1993), Mar del Plata Open Chess Tournament (1997), Binissalem Open Chess tournament (2003).

Fernando Braga played for Argentina B team and Italy in the Chess Olympiad:

- In 1978, at fourth board in the 23rd Chess Olympiad in Buenos Aires (+3, =3, -4),
- In 1986, at second board in the 27th Chess Olympiad in Dubai (+1, =3, -4),
- In 1988, at second board in the 28th Chess Olympiad in Thessaloniki (+4, =2, -3),
- In 1992, at first reserve board in the 30th Chess Olympiad in Manila (+5, =4, -0),
- In 2002, at second board in the 35th Chess Olympiad in Bled (+5, =2, -4),
- In 2004, at second board in the 36th Chess Olympiad in Calvià (+1, =4, -5).

Fernando Braga played for Argentina in the World Youth U26 Team Chess Championship:

- In 1980, at third board in the 2nd World Youth U26 Team Chess Championship in Mexico City (+5, =5, -2) and won team bronze medal,
- In 1981, at second board in the 3rd World Youth U26 Team Chess Championship in Graz (+3, =3, -2).

Fernando Braga played for Italy in the Men's Chess Mitropa Cup:

- In 1993, at second board in the 15th Chess Mitropa Cup in Bad Wörishofen (+1, =6, -0).
