= Giovanni Martinolich =

Italian chess player

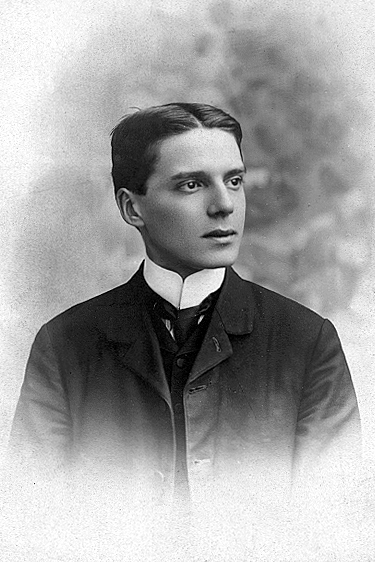
Giovanni Martinolich

Giovanni Martinolich (22 June 1884 – 25 July 1910) was a chess master from the Austro-Hungarian Empire.

He was born in Trieste (then Austria-Hungary Empire), the son of Dr Giovanni Martinolich (Padrincich or Padrinzi of Lussinpiccolo), a lawyer, Sec. of the Austrian Association of Maritime law and legal advisor to the British and US Consulates and Anna Gerolimich of Lussinpiccolo a ship owner. He studied in Vienna. In 1905/06, he took 4th, behind Leopold Löwy, Jr, Milan Vidmar and Savielly Tartakower, in campionato di Vienna. He won, ahead of Stefano Rosselli del Turco and Arturo Reggio, at Milan 1906 (unofficial Italian Chess Championship, IV torneo dell'Unione Scacchistica Italiana), took 9th at Vienna 1907 (the 1st Trebitsch Memorial, Jacques Mieses won), and won, ahead of Matteo Gladig, at Triest 1909 (campionato della Società Scacchistica Triestina).

In 1910, he published an article Il Fegatello nell'apertura Spagnola in the Rivista Scacchistica Italiana. He died suddenly at the age of 26, of heart related causes.
