= Reggio =

Reggio may refer to:

== Places ==
- Reggio Calabria, in southern Italy
  - Province of Reggio Calabria
- Reggio Emilia, in northern Italy
  - Province of Reggio Emilia
- Reggio, Louisiana, in United States of America

== People ==
- Arturo Reggio (1863–1917), Italian chess player
- Godfrey Reggio (born 1940), American film director
- Isaac Samuel Reggio (1784–1855), Austro-Italian scholar and rabbi

== See also ==
- Reggio Emilia approach, an educational philosophy
