= Stefano Rosselli del Turco =

Italian chess player

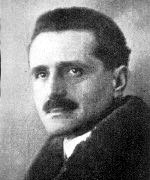
Stefano Rosselli del Turco

Stefano Rosselli del Turco, Marquis, (27 July 1877 – 18 August 1947) was an Italian chess player, writer and publisher. He was five times Italian champion and represented Italy in the Chess Olympiad seven times. He was a member of the famous Rosselli del Turco noble family of Florence.

== Italian championships results ==
Born in Florence, Rosselli del Turco received the title of National Master from the Italian Chess Federation in 1900. He played in all ten of the first official Italian championships, and was twice official Italian champion. He tied for 7-8th at Viareggio 1921 (1st ITA-ch, Davide Marotti won); won a match for the title against Marotti (8½–4½) at Naples 1923; lost a match for the title to Mario Monticelli (6–8) at Florence 1929; won at Milan 1931 (4th ITA-ch); took 6th at Milan 1934 (Monticelli won); tied for 2nd-3rd at Florence 1935 (Antonio Sacconi won); tied for 7-9th at Florence 1936 (Vincenzo Castaldi won); took 12th at Naples 1937 (Castaldi won); tied for 7-8th at Rome 1939 (Monticelli won), and tied for 7-8th at Florence 1943 (10th ITA-ch, Vincenzo Nestler won). As well, he was unofficial Italian champion in 1919 and 1920.

== International tournaments results ==
He tied for 8-9th at Sanremo 1911 (Hans Fahrni won); placed 10-11th at Opatija 1912 (King's Gambit tournament) with a score of 7½/21 points (Rudolf Spielmann won); won at Bologna 1913 scoring 5½/7; took 5th at Trieste 1923 (Paul Johner won); tied for 12-13th at Meran 1924 (Ernst Grünfeld won); placed 16-17th at Baden-Baden 1925 with 7½/20 (Alexander Alekhine won); and took 9th at Meran 1926 (Edgar Colle won). Rosselli won at Livorno 1926; took 6th at Venice 1929 (Rudolf Pitschak won); tied for 2nd-3rd with Abraham Baratz, behind Brian Reilly, at Nice 1931, and placed 12th at the Zurich 1934 chess tournament scoring 4½/15 points (Alekhine won).

== Chess Olympiads ==
Rosselli del Turco represented Italy in the Chess Olympiad:

- In 1924 at 1st unofficial Chess Olympiad in Paris (+5 –4 =4), took team 6th place and individual 14-15th (Consolation Cup, Karel Hromádka won);
- In 1927 at first board in 1st Chess Olympiad in London (+2 –3 =10);
- In 1931 at first board in 4th Chess Olympiad in Prague (+2 –8 =8);
- In 1933 at first board in 5th Chess Olympiad in Folkestone (+1 –6 =5);
- In 1935 at third board in 6th Chess Olympiad in Warsaw (+1 –11 =3);
- In 1936 at second board in 3rd unofficial Chess Olympiad in Munich (+2 –10 =5);
- In 1937 at first reserve board in 7th Chess Olympiad in Stockholm (+2 –7 =0).

He also participated in the 1928 World Amateur Championship at The Hague, won by Max Euwe, placing 9-11th with a score of 6/15 points.

== Writer, publisher, legacy ==
In the years 1911–1916 and 1924–1943, he was the founder and an editor of the Italian chess journal L'Italia Scacchistica. He played some correspondence chess as well, later in life.

He was a strong attacking player, essaying a sharp style, and was at his best up to the late 1920s, when his results declined, likely due to age.
