= Carlo Micheli =

Italian chess player (born 1946)

Personal information
- Born: 15 September 1946 (age 79) Bruneck, Italy

Chess career
- Country: Italy
- Title: FIDE Master (1983)
- Peak rating: 2360 (July 2003)

Carlo Micheli (born 15 September 1946) is an Italian chess FIDE Master (FM) and two-time Italian Chess Championship winner (1972, 1973).

== Biography ==
In the 1970s, Carlo Micheli was one of the strongest Italian chess players. He won the Italian Chess Championship twice in a row: 1972 and 1973. Carlo Micheli won the Italian Team Chess Championships with the chess club Circolo Scacchistico Marosticense / VIMAR Marostica in 1993 and 1997.

Carlo Micheli played for Italy in the Chess Olympiads:

- In 1972, at the fourth board in the 20th Chess Olympiad in Skopje (+1, =4, -7),
- In 1976, at the fourth board in the 22nd Chess Olympiad in Haifa (+2, =2, -5).

Carlo Micheli played for Italy in the Clare Benedict Cup:

- In 1973, at the second board in the 20th Clare Benedict Cup in Gstaad (+0, =0, -6).

Carlo Micheli is Vice President of the Città di Marostica chess club. Under his leadership, the team from Marostica won the Italian Team Chess Championships in 2001, 2002, 2003, 2004 and 2007.
