= Bela Tóth (chess player) =

Italian chess player (born 1943)

Béla Tóth
Personal information
- Born: 19 April 1943 (age 83) Budapest, Hungary

Chess career
- Country: Hungary; Italy
- Title: FIDE International Master (1974); ICCF Grandmaster (2004)
- FIDE rating: 2307 (December 2021)
- Peak rating: 2440 (July 1985)
- ICCF rating: 2631 (April 2011)
- ICCF peak rating: 2632 (July 2010)

Béla Tóth (born 19 April 1943) is a Hungarian-born Italian chess player who holds the FIDE title of International Master (IM, 1974) and the ICCF title of Correspondence Chess Grandmaster (GM, 2004). He is a four-time Italian Chess Championship winner (1975, 1976, 1980, 1982), a Hungarian Chess Championship medalist (1971), a Chess Olympiad individual silver medalist (1976), and a European Correspondence Chess Championship winner (1973-78).

== Biography ==
Béla Tóth was born in Hungary and in 1971 won a bronze medal in the Hungarian Chess Championship. He moved to Italy in the early 1970s and became a four-time winner of the Italian Chess Championship: 1975, 1976, 1980, and 1982. Béla Tóth successfully participated in international chess tournaments held in Italy. He has won the Bratto chess festival three times: in 1978, 1979 and 1983. Béla Tóth finished 2nd in the Banco di Roma chess tournaments in 1976 and 1977, and 3rd-4th in the 1984 tournament. In 1978 he won the 11th European Correspondence Chess Championship (1973-78). In 1982, playing in the first board, Béla Tóth won the 19th Italian Team Chess Championship with chess club Milanese Chess Society.

Béla Tóth played for Italy in the Chess Olympiads:

- In 1974, at third board in the 21st Chess Olympiad in Nice (+9, =2, -6),
- In 1976, at second board in the 22nd Chess Olympiad in Haifa (+7, =3, -2) and won individual silver medal,
- In 1980, at first board in the 24th Chess Olympiad in La Valletta (+4, =4, -4),
- In 1984, at second board in the 26th Chess Olympiad in Thessaloniki (+4, =3, -5).

Béla Tóth played for Italy in the Men's Chess Mitropa Cup:

- In 1978, at second board in the 3rd Chess Mitropa Cup in Ciocco (+4, =0, -1) and won team gold medal,
- In 1979, at first board in the 4th Chess Mitropa Cup in Bern (+2, =1, -2).

In 1974, Béla Tóth awarded the FIDE International Master (IM) title but in 2004 he awarded International Correspondence Chess Grandmaster title.

In the mid-1980s Béla Tóth moved to Allschwil in Switzerland, where he works as an instructor at the local chess club. He has written several chess books, including Damengambits Minoritätsangriff (1987) and Die Russische Verteidigung (1987).
