= Alberto Mario Giustolisi =

Italian chess player (1928–1990)

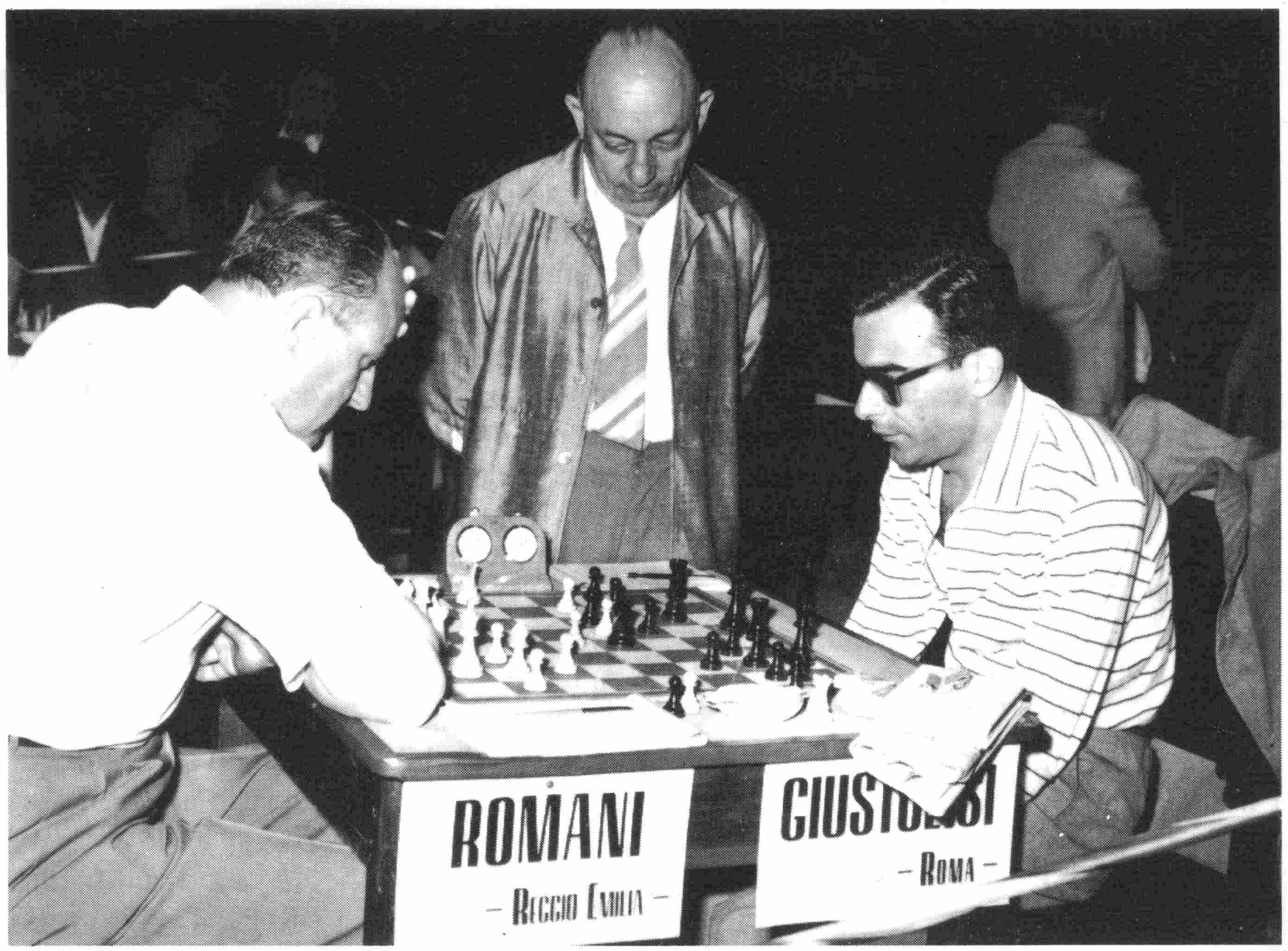

Personal information
- Born: 17 March 1928 Rome, Italy
- Died: 27 February 1990 (aged 61) Genzano di Roma, Italy

Chess career
- Country: Italy
- Title: International Master (1962)

Alberto Mario Giustolisi (17 March 1928 – 27 February 1990) was an Italian chess International Master (IM) (1962), four-time Italian Chess Championship winner (1952, 1961, 1964, 1966).

== Biography ==
Alberto Mario Giustolisi four time won Italian Chess Championships: 1952 (shared first place with Vincenzo Castaldi and Federico Norcia), 1961, 1964 and 1966. He has also won four Italian Team Chess Championships: 1959, 1962, 1963 and 1973. He was numerous Roman chess champion.

Alberto Mario Giustolisi won chess tournaments in Rome in 1951, 1953 and 1974, Acquasparta in 1955, Bellaria in 1956. In 1950 he was third in the Lucerne International Chess Tournament behind Max Euwe and Hermann Pilnik. In 1961-1962 Alberto Mario Giustolisi won, first among the Italians, the New Year's Chess Tournament in Reggio Emilia.

Alberto Mario Giustolisi played for Italy in the Chess Olympiads:

- In 1950, at fourth board in the 9th Chess Olympiad in Dubrovnik (+2, =3, -7),
- In 1968, at first board in the 18th Chess Olympiad in Lugano (+6, =5, -5).

Also Alberto Mario Giustolisi five time played for Italy in the Clare Benedict Chess Cups (1953, 1958–1961).
