= Giorgio Porreca =

Italian chess player

Personal information
- Born: 30 August 1927 Naples, Italy
- Died: 5 January 1988 (aged 61) Naples, Italy

Chess career
- Country: Italy
- Title: International Master, International Correspondence Chess Master (1975)

Giorgio Porreca (30 August 1927 – 5 January 1988) was an Italian chess player. He was awarded the title of International Master by FIDE.

Born in Naples, he won the Italian Chess Championship two times: at Sorrento in 1950 (ahead of Nicolas Engalicev) and at Rovigo in 1956. He was seven times winner of the Italian correspondence championship in the period from 1957 to 1973 (no other Italian player equalled this feat). He played for Italy in three Chess Olympiads: at Dubrovnik 1950 (3rd board), Helsinki 1952 (1st board) and Amsterdam 1954 (2nd board) with the overall result of (+ 17 – 11 = 15). Porreca was also twice winner of the Italian club championship with team Genoa.

Porreca wrote several books on chess history. He had a university degree in Russian language and Russian literature and translated a number of Russian chess books into Italian. He founded and directed until his death the Italian chess magazine Scacco!, published in Santa Maria Capua Vetere, a town near Naples. He was a lover and expert of endgame studies, editing for many years the special section on studies of the magazine Scacco!.

== Bibliography ==
- Adriano Chicco, Antonio Rosino (1990). Storia degli scacchi in Italia (in Italian). Venice: Marsilio. ISBN 9788831753838
