= Barbara Pernici =

Italian chess player (born 1956)

Personal information
- Born: 26 June 1956 (age 70) Trieste, Italy

Chess career
- Country: Italy
- Title: Woman FIDE Master (2001)
- Peak rating: 2105 (July 1987)

Barbara Pernici (born 26 June 1956, Trieste) is an Italian chess player who holds the title of Woman FIDE master (WFM). She is a five time Italian Women's Chess Champion, professor and scientist.

== Biography ==
From the mid-1970s to the early 1980s, Pernici was one of Italy's leading women chess players. She won the Italian Women's Chess Championships five times in 1974, 1977, 1978, 1979 and 1981.

Barbara Pernici played for Italy in the Women's Chess Olympiads:

- In 1976, at second board in the 7th Chess Olympiad (women) in Haifa (+4, =2, -5),
- In 1980, at first board in the 9th Chess Olympiad (women) in Valletta (+4, =7, -1),
- In 1982, at first board in the 10th Chess Olympiad (women) in Lucerne (+9, =1, -2) and won the individual gold medal.

In the following years, she stopped her chess playing career. Pernici earned a second level degree in electronics from Polytechnic University of Milan and a MS degree in computer science from Stanford University. She was a professor at University of Udine. Since 1993, she is a professor at the Polytechnic University of Milan.
