= Vittorio Torre =

Italian chess player

Vittorio Torre died 16 January 1921 in Turin (Italy) was an Italian chess player.

He became unofficial Chess Champion of Italy in Turin (VI Torneo Nazionale) in 1895, beating Beniamino Vergani.
