= Alberto David =

Italian chess grandmaster (born 1970)

- Alberto David at the EU Open Championship, Liverpool 2008

Personal information
- Born: 26 March 1970 (age 56) Milan, Italy

Chess career
- Country: Luxembourg (until 2012); Italy (since 2012)
- Title: Grandmaster (1998)
- FIDE rating: 2454 (September 2026)
- Peak rating: 2631 (May 2010)

Alberto David (born 26 March 1970) is an Italian chess grandmaster. He is a three-time Italian Chess Champion.

== Chess career ==
David was born in Milan in 1970, and in 1974 moved with his parents to Luxembourg, where he learned to play chess a year later. He attained some success at the youth level but it was not until he finished his philosophy studies in London in 1992 that his chess career began. He earned his grandmaster title in 1998, becoming Luxembourg's first grandmaster. He competed for Luxembourg at the Chess Olympiads of 1994, 1996, 1998, 2000, 2002 and 2006, playing on the top board each time. In 2002 he won the individual silver medal with a score of 84.6% (+10–1=2). In 2012 he obtained Italian citizenship and transferred to the Italian Chess Federation in July of the same year. He competed for Italy on board 2 at the 2014 Olympiad.

David's tournament victories include the HZ Tournament in Vlissingen in 1999, the 1st NAO Chess Club GM tournament in Paris in 2003, the Paris Chess Championship in 2003 and 2005, and the inaugural Riga Technical University Open in Riga in 2011. David won the Italian Chess Championship in 2012 and 2016 (after winning the playoff against Sabino Brunello) and again in 2019. In 2022 he won the Festival International des Jeunes tournament in Paris after winning on tie-break with Niels Willems.
