= Ennio Arlandi =

Italian chess player (born 1966)

Personal information
- Born: 21 January 1966 (age 60) Alessandria, Italy

Chess career
- Country: Italy
- Title: International Master (1987)
- FIDE rating: 2414 (September 2026)
- Peak rating: 2470 (January 1997)

Ennio Arlandi (born 21 January 1966), is an Italian chess International Master (IM) (1987), Italian Chess Championship winner (2000), two-times Chess Olympiad individual gold medalist (1988, 1994).

== Biography ==
From 1980 to 1985 Ennio Arlandi represented Italy in several European and World Youth Chess Championships. The biggest success came in 1981 when he won silver medal in World Youth Chess Championship in U16 age group. In the Italian Chess Championships Ennio Arlandi won gold (2000) and silver (2005, after losing additional match) medals.

He is winner of many international chess tournaments, including shared 1st-2nd place in Nuoro (1984), shared 2nd-3rd place in Reggio Emilia (1991), 3rd place in Reggio Emilia (1992), shared 2nd - 4th place in Asti (1995), twice shared 1st-3nd place in Imperia (1995, 2005).

Ennio Arlandi played for Italy in the Chess Olympiads:

- In 1982, at third board in the 25th Chess Olympiad in Lucerne (+0, =5, -2),
- In 1988, at first reserve board in the 28th Chess Olympiad in Thessaloniki (+5, =1, -1) and won individual gold medal,
- In 1990, at third board in the 29th Chess Olympiad in Novi Sad (+1, =3, -4),
- In 1992, at third board in the 30th Chess Olympiad in Manila (+3, =3, -3),
- In 1994, at third board in the 31st Chess Olympiad in Moscow (+7, =1, -1) and won individual gold medal,
- In 1996, at second board in the 32nd Chess Olympiad in Yerevan (+3, =4, -4),
- In 1998, at third board in the 33rd Chess Olympiad in Elista (+3, =7, -0),
- In 2000, at fourth board in the 34th Chess Olympiad in Istanbul (+3, =2, -3),
- In 2002, at first reserve board in the 35th Chess Olympiad in Bled (+5, =3, -2),
- In 2004, at third board in the 36th Chess Olympiad in Calvià (+3, =3, -4),
- In 2006, at first reserve board in the 37th Chess Olympiad in Turin (+7, =0, -2).

Ennio Arlandi played for Italy in the European Team Chess Championships:

- In 1989, at second board in the 9th European Team Chess Championship in Haifa (+2, =4, -3),
- In 1992, at first board in the 10th European Team Chess Championship in Debrecen (+0, =4, -3),
- In 1997, at third board in the 11th European Team Chess Championship in Pula (+4, =2, -3),
- In 1999, at third board in the 12th European Team Chess Championship in Batumi (+2, =6, -0),
- In 2001, at second board in the 13th European Team Chess Championship in León (+1, =2, -3),
- In 2003, at second board in the 14th European Team Chess Championship in Plovdiv (+1, =2, -4),

In 1987, he was awarded the FIDE International Master (IM) title.
