= Tea Gueci =

Italian chess player (born 1999)

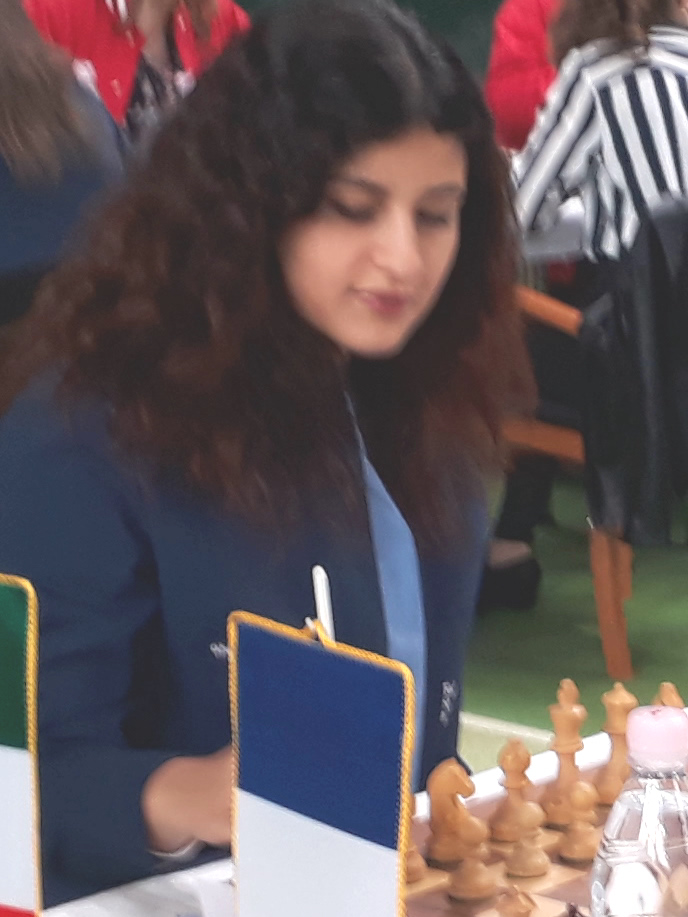
- Gueci in 2019

Personal information
- Born: 26 December 1999 (age 26) Palermo, Italy

Chess career
- Country: Italy
- Title: Woman International Master (2019)
- Peak rating: 2268 (November 2019)

Tea Gueci (born 26 December 1999) is an Italian chess player who holds the FIDE title of Woman International Master (WIM, 2019). She is a winner of the Italian Women Chess Championship (2012).

== Chess career ==
Gueci began playing chess at age seven. In 2009, she won Italian girl's championship in age category U10. In 2011, Tea Gueci won Italian girl's championship in age category U12. After her first title, she participation in five European Youth Chess Championships and five World Youth Chess Championships. In 2011 she was ranked seventh in the U12 World Girl's Championship in Brazil.

She won Italian women's chess championship in 2012 in Acqui Terme and became the youngest Italian women's champion in the history of all tournaments. The following year, after taking part in the Women's European chess championship, she became Italian women's chess vice-champion and Italian girl's chess champion in age category U20.

Gueci played for Italy in the Women's Chess Olympiads:

- In 2014, at fourth board in the 41st Chess Olympiad (women) in Tromsø (+2, =2, -3).

She played for Italy in the European Team Chess Championships:

- In 2013, at reserve board in the 10th European Team Chess Championship (women) in Warsaw (+2, =1, -2),
- In 2017, at reserve board in the 12th European Team Chess Championship (women) in Hersonissos (+2, =4, -1).

Gueci received her Woman FIDE Master (WFM) title in 2014 and Woman International Master (WIM) title in 2019.
