= Suchart Chaivichit =

Thai chess player (born 1956)

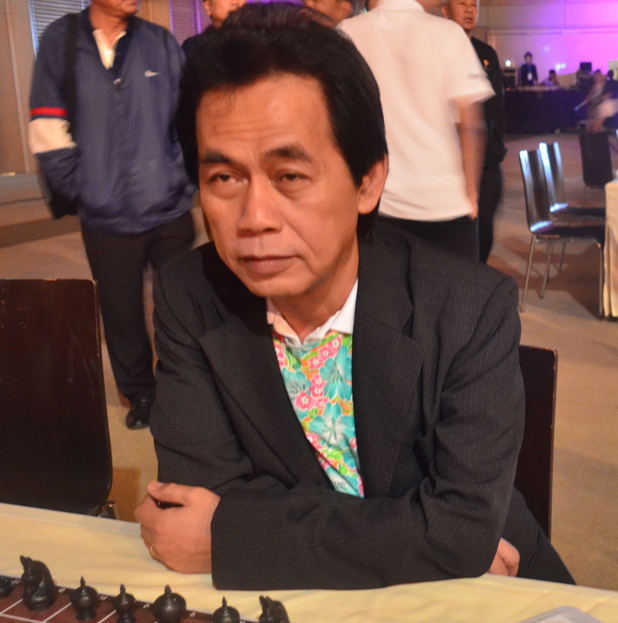
- Suchart Chaivichit in 2012

Personal information
- Born: 8 July 1956 (age 70)

Chess career
- Country: Thailand
- Title: FIDE Master (1984)
- FIDE rating: 2270 (January 2010)
- Peak rating: 2420 (July 1983)

Suchart Chaivichit (Thai: สุชาติ ชัยวิชิต; born 8 July 1956) is a Thai makruk and chess player. He is a five-time makruk champion of Thailand (1983, 1987, 1988, 1990, 1991). In chess he is a FIDE Master and three-time Chess Olympiad individual medalist (1982, 1988, 1996).

== Biography ==
Suchart Chaivichit has been a leading makruk player in Thailand. He won the national makruk championship five times, and also won a national makruk festival in 2004.

Suchart Chaivichit also plays chess. He represented Thailand in the Chess Olympiad five times:

- in 1980, at the first board in the 24th Chess Olympiad in La Valletta (+5, =6, -3),
- in 1982, at the third board in the 25th Chess Olympiad in Lucerne (+9, =0, -3), winning an individual silver medal,
- in 1984, at the first board in the 26th Chess Olympiad in Thessaloniki (+5, =3, -5),
- in 1988, at the fourth board in the 28th Chess Olympiad in Thessaloniki (+8, =0, -1), winning an individual gold medal,
- in 1996, at the third board in the 32nd Chess Olympiad in Yerevan (+7, =0, -2), winning an individual silver medal.

Suchart Chaivichit played for Thailand three times in the Men's Asian Team Chess Championship:

- in 1979, at the fourth board in the 3rd Asian Team Chess Championship in Singapore (+3, =1, -4),
- in 1981, at the first board in the 4th Asian Team Chess Championship in Hangzhou (+3, =0, -5),
- in 1989, at the second board in the 8th Asian Team Chess Championship in Genting Highlands (+5, =1, -2), winning an individual bronze medal.
