= Sergio Mariotti =

Italian chess grandmaster (born 1946)

Personal information
- Born: 10 August 1946 (age 79) Florence, Italy

Chess career
- Country: Italy
- Title: Grandmaster (1974)
- Peak rating: 2500 (January 1980)
- Peak ranking: No. 86 (January 1975)

Sergio Mariotti (born 10 August 1946) is an Italian chess player. He is the first Italian to achieve the title of Grandmaster, which FIDE awarded him in 1974. As of August 2023, his FIDE Rating is 2240.

== Career ==
Born in Florence, he became the Italian junior champion in 1965 at Turin and in 1969 at San Benedetto, the full Italian Champion. One of his greatest tournament successes followed in 1971 when he finished second at Venice (after Walter Browne and ahead of Vlastimil Hort, Lubomir Kavalek and Svetozar Gligorić).

Mariotti represented his country at the Chess Olympiad in 1972, 1974, 1986 and 1988. At the Olympiad of 1974, held in Nice, he scored a double success. A board one score of 73.7% (+12 =4 −3) earned him the individual bronze medal (behind Anatoly Karpov and Alberto Delgado, jointly with Eugenio Torre), while also securing his final grandmaster norm. As no Italian before him had achieved the title of International Grandmaster, he gained overnight celebrity status when the honour was bestowed on him the same year. Around this time, British Chess Magazine nicknamed him "The Italian Fury", due mainly to his formidable collection of tournament wins, but also for his enterprising, tactical style of play.

He was victorious in many international tournaments, including Naples 1968, La Spezia 1969, Naples 1969, Reggio Emilia 1970, San Benedetto 1970, Bari 1971, and Rovigo 1976. He won the Rilton Cup (Stockholm) in 1976/77 and triumphed at Lugano in 1979.

With regard to world championship qualification attempts, he won at the Caorle zonal of 1975 and play-off match vs. Joaqim Durao to qualify for the prestigious Manila Interzonal of 1976, where he finished joint 10th (with Boris Spassky, Wolfgang Uhlmann and Florin Gheorghiu). The result was insufficient to advance to the Candidates' Matches. At the Praia da Rocha zonal tournament of 1978, he finished fourth, one place away from Interzonal qualification.

His choice of chess opening often revolved around the Sicilian Defence or Ruy Lopez, where he was comfortable with either colour. Occasionally, his fans were treated to old-fashioned, romantic openings such as the Evans Gambit and Albin Counter Gambit, and these brought him surprising success.

Mariotti became an advisor for an Italian publisher and worked for the Italian Chess Federation (FSI), where he was President between 1994 and 1996. As a precursor to the Turin Olympiad of 2006, he played a website game against the 'Rest of the World' and won in 48 moves. He again played a match against the 'Rest of the World' between October 2018 and March 2019; this second match ended in a draw in 20 moves.
