= Bogo-Indian Defence, Monticelli Trap =

Monticelli Trap
Position: a8 black rook, b8 black knight, d8 black queen, f8 black rook, g8 black king, a7 black pawn, b7 black bishop, c7 black pawn, d7 black pawn, f7 black pawn, g7 black pawn, h7 black pawn, b6 black pawn, e6 black pawn, g5 white knight, c4 white pawn, d4 white pawn, c3 black knight, g3 white pawn, a2 white pawn, b2 white pawn, c2 white queen, e2 white pawn, f2 white pawn, g2 white bishop, h2 white pawn, a1 white rook, e1 white king, h1 white rook
- Moves: 1.d4 Nf6 2.c4 e6 3.Nf3 Bb4+ 4.Bd2 Bxd2+ 5.Qxd2 b6 6.g3 Bb7 7.Bg2 O-O 8.Nc3 Ne4 9.Qc2 Nxc3 10.Ng5
- ECO: E11
- Origin: Monticelli vs. Prokeš, Budapest 1926
- Named after: Mario Monticelli
- Parent: Bogo–Indian Defense

In chess, the Monticelli Trap is a combination in the Bogo–Indian Defence, named for Italian champion Mario Monticelli from the game Monticelli versus Prokeš, Budapest 1926. Although it is called a trap because White wins the exchange, Black does obtain some compensation.

The trap begins with the moves:

1. d4 Nf6
2. c4 e6
3. Nf3 Bb4+

Black plays the Bogo–Indian Defence.

4. Bd2 Bxd2+
5. Qxd2 b6
6. g3 Bb7
7. Bg2 0-0
8. Nc3 Ne4
9. Qc2 Nxc3
10. Ng5! (see diagram)

== Discussion ==
White threatens mate with 11.Qxh7# as well as 11.Bxb7 winning a bishop and a rook. After either 10...Ne4 11.Bxe4 or 10...Qxg5 11.Bxb7, Black loses the exchange, but obtains compensation in the form of one or more pawns and possibly a weakened white king. It is unclear if the position is a forced win for White.

Former world champion José Raúl Capablanca allowed 10.Ng5 twice in consecutive games as Black against Max Euwe in Amsterdam, 1931, drawing both times. The second game continued:

10...Ne4 11.Bxe4 Bxe4 12.Qxe4 Qxg5 13.Qxa8 Nc6 14.Qb7 Nxd4 15.Rd1 c5 16.e3 Nc2+ 17.Kd2 Qf5 18.Qg2 Nb4 19.e4 Qf6 20.Kc1 Nxa2+ 21.Kb1 Nb4 22.Rxd7 Nc6 23.f4 e5 24.Rhd1 Nd4 25.Rxa7 exf4 26.gxf4 Qxf4 27.Re1 Nf3 28.Re2 Nd4 29.Re1 ½–½

The line has been played several times over the years at the highest levels, including Portisch–Andersson 1983, which ended in a draw, and Aronian–Postny 2005, which White won. The offer of the exchange has in fact been refused by White in grandmaster games (either by 10.Qxc3 or 10.Ng5 Ne4 11.Bxe4 Bxe4 12.Nxe4).

== See also ==
- List of chess openings named after people
