= Francesco Sonis =

Italian chess grandmaster (born 2002)

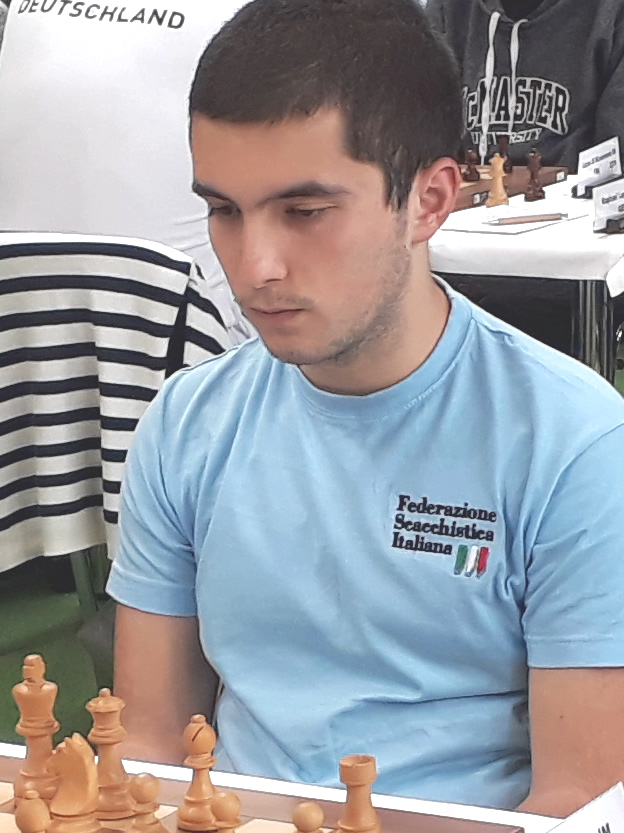
- Mitropa Cup 2019

Personal information
- Born: 29 April 2002 (age 24) Oristano, Italy

Chess career
- Country: Italy
- Title: Grandmaster (2021)
- FIDE rating: 2539 (September 2026)
- Peak rating: 2579 (June 2024)

Francesco Sonis (born 29 April 2002) is an Italian chess player who holds the title of Grandmaster (2021).

== Biography ==
In 2013, Francesco Sonis won Italian Youth Chess Championship in the U12 age group.

He participated in European Youth Chess Championships and World Youth Chess Championships in the different age groups. Best result - in 2018, in Riga Francesco Sonis won European Youth Chess Championship in the O16 age group.

In 2017, he was awarded the FIDE International Master (IM) title.

In December 2020 he won the bronze medal at FIDE Online World Cadets & Youth Rapid Chess Championship in U18 Open category. He lost to Nihal Sarin in semifinal, but won against Mahdi Gholami Orimi in third place match at armageddon.

In May 2021 he won the Mitropa Cup with the Italian national team, in August he obtained the third norm of Grandmaster in Spilimbergo.
