= Noël Studer =

Swiss chess grandmaster (born 1996)

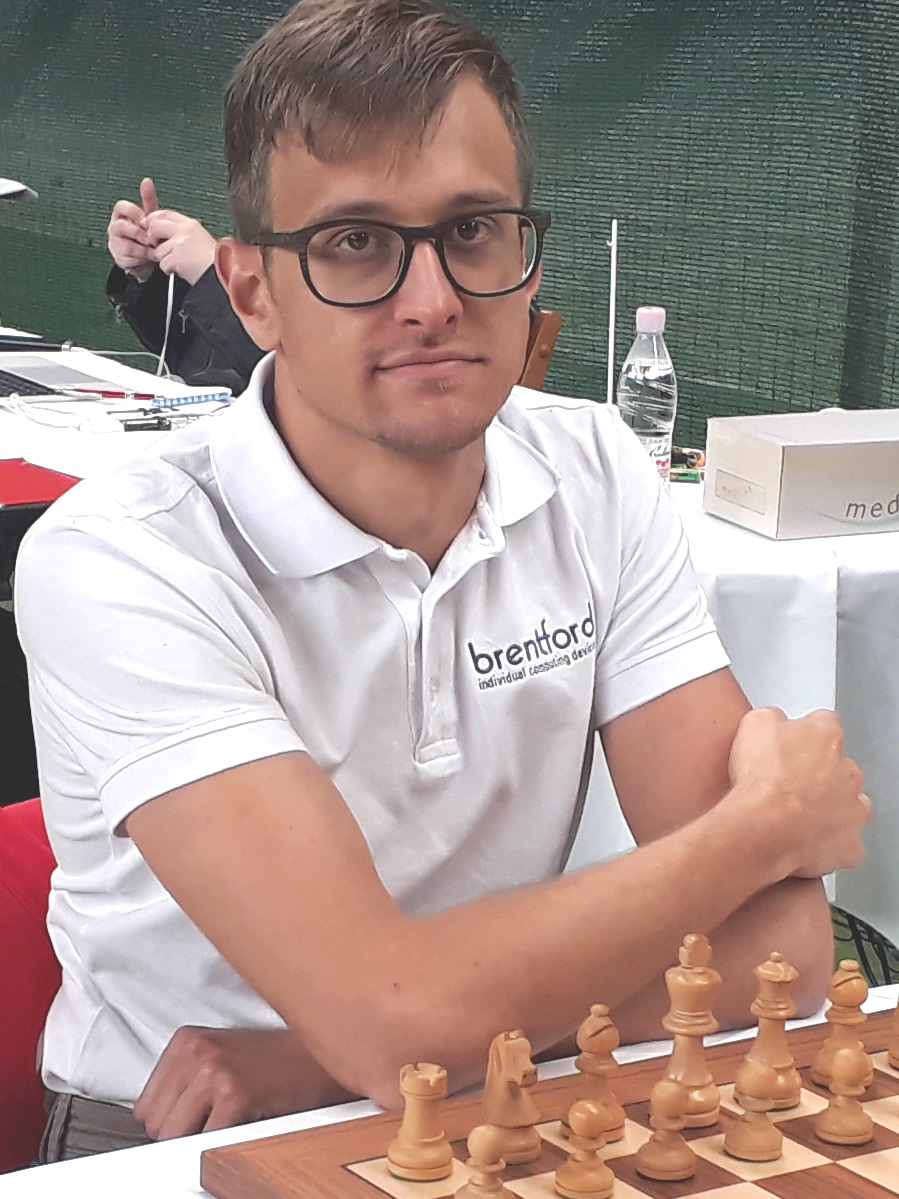
- Noël Studer, 2019

Personal information
- Born: Noël Oliver Studer; 18 October 1996 (age 29) Bern, Switzerland
- Spouse: Alessia Carmen Santeramo (m. 2025)
- Website: nextlevelchess.com

Chess career
- Country: Switzerland
- Title: Grandmaster (2017)
- FIDE rating: 2582 (July 2026)
- Peak rating: 2588 (December 2020)

Noël Oliver Studer (born 18 October 1996) is a Swiss chess grandmaster. He was Swiss Chess Champion in 2016, and again in 2019.

== Chess career ==
Born in 1996, Studer earned his International Master title in 2014 and his grandmaster title in 2017. His achievement of the latter title at the age of 20 makes him Switzerland's youngest ever grandmaster. He is the No. 2 ranked Swiss player as of October 2021.

In 2019, Studer won the Accentus Young Masters, held from 27 February to 7 March. He won his first five games, and finished one point clear of the rest of the field with 7½/9 (+6–0=3).

On 5 August 2021 Studer announced he would be retiring from competitive chess at the start of 2022, citing health problems, and his desire to focus on other career paths. He is currently operating a chess blog, which started in March 2021.

== Personal life ==
In January 2023, Studer announced that he was engaged to WFM Alessia Santeramo. They married on 4 July 2025.
