= Daniela Movileanu =

Italian chess player

Personal information
- Born: 2 December 1996 (age 29)

Chess career
- Country: Italy
- Title: Woman FIDE Master (2012)
- Peak rating: 2268 (September 2016)

Daniela Movileanu (born 2 December 1996) is an Italian chess player who holds the title of Woman FIDE Master (WFM, 2012). She won twice the Italian Women Chess Championship (2015, 2016).

== Chess career ==
From 2009 to 2012 Daniela Movileanu played in World Youth Chess Championships.

She won Italian women's chess championships in 2015 in Giovinazzo and in 2016 in Perugia.

Daniela Movileanu played for Italy in the Women's Chess Olympiads:

- In 2016, was the third board in the 42nd Chess Olympiad (women) in Baku (+3, =2, -4).

Daniela Movileanu played for Italy in the European Team Chess Championships:

- In 2015, was the fourth board in the 11th European Team Chess Championship (women) in Reykjavík (+2, =3, -3).
