= Alessia Santeramo =

Italian chess player (born 1998)

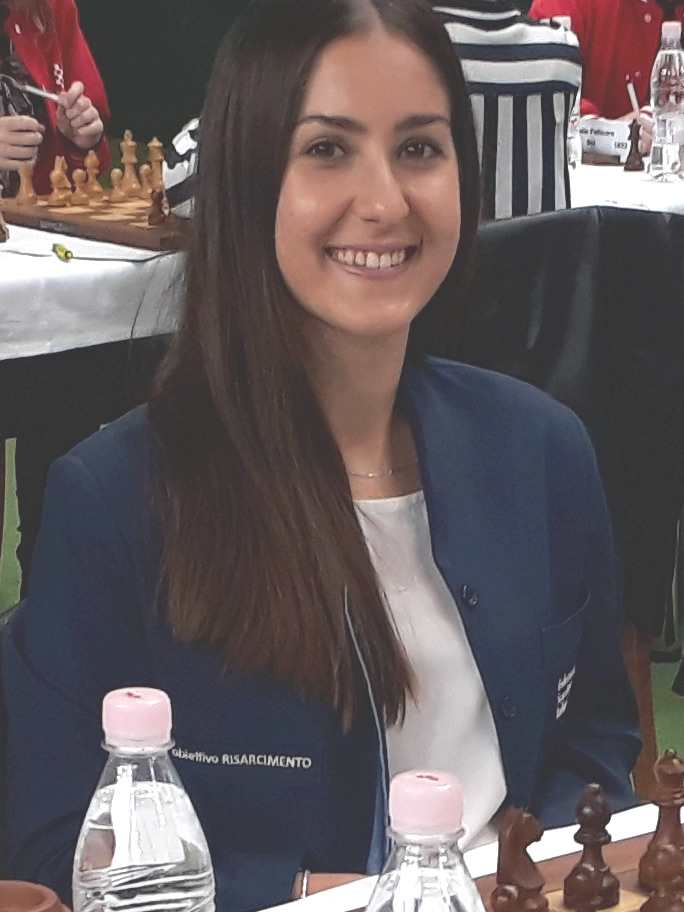

Personal information
- Born: October 2, 1998 (age 27) Barletta, Italy
- Spouse: Noël Studer (m. 2025)

Chess career
- Country: Italy
- Title: Woman FIDE Master (2014)
- Peak rating: 2217 (October 2014)

Alessia Carmen Santeramo is an Italian chess player.

== Chess career ==
In September 2014, she won the Italian Women's Chess Championship, beating Laura Gueci on tiebreaks.

In 2015, she played in the European Team Chess Championship, where she won the silver medal on the reserve board.

In 2016, she was the U18 Italian Chess Champion and finished in third place in the U20 Italian Chess Championship.

== Personal life ==
In July 2025, she married Swiss grandmaster Noël Studer.
