= Matteo Gladig =

Italian chess player

Matteo Gladig (1880, Triest – 1915, Ljubljana) was an Italian chess master.

Born in Triest (then Austria-Hungary Empire), he won at Triest 1905 (torneo sociale della Società Scacchistica Triestina), took 2nd, behind Giovanni Martinolich, at Triest 1909 (campionato della SST), and drew a short match with Oldřich Duras (+1 –1 =2) at Triest 1909. He won, ahead of Stefano Rosselli del Turco and Arturo Reggio, at Rome 1911 (unofficial Italian Chess Championship, V Torneo dell'Unione Scacchistica Italiana).

During World War I, he (as an Austrian citizen of Italian origin) did not want to fight for an Austrian Army on the Italian Front. Finally, he was captured and tried in Laibach (Ljubljana, then Austria-Hungary, now Slovenia) where he died.
