= Enrico Paoli =

Italian chess grandmaster (1908–2005)

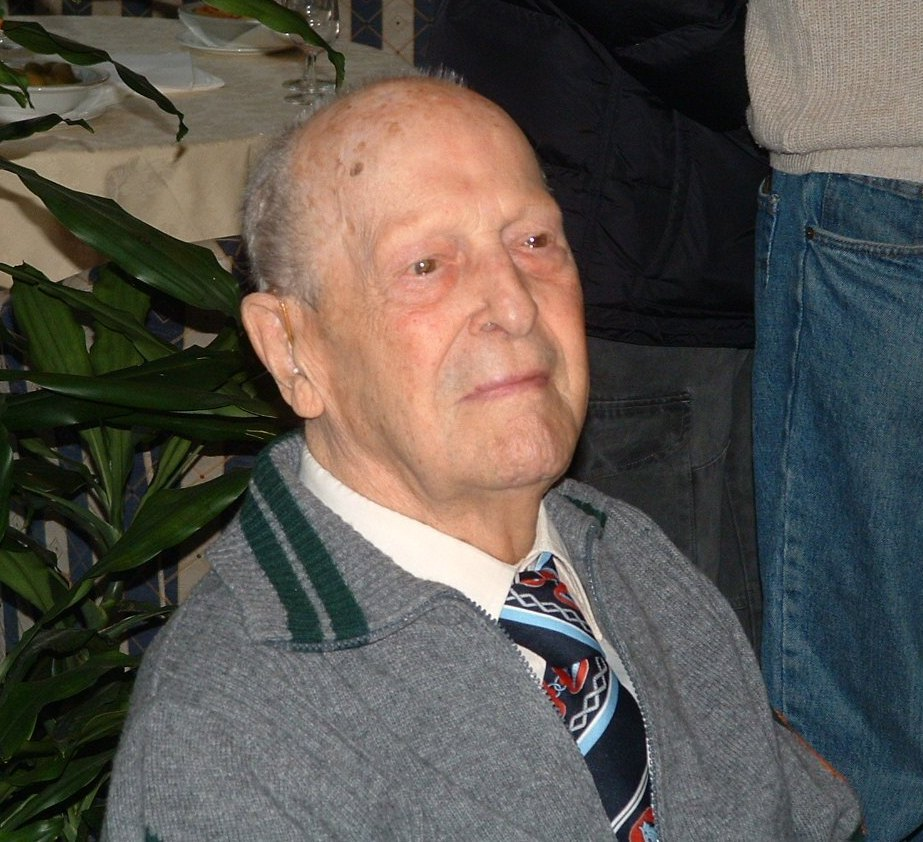
- Paoli in 2004

Personal information
- Born: January 13, 1908 Trieste, Austria-Hungary
- Died: December 15, 2005 (aged 97) Reggio Emilia, Italy

Chess career
- Country: Italy
- Title: Grandmaster (1996)
- Peak rating: 2355 (July 1971)

Enrico Paoli (January 13, 1908 – December 15, 2005) was an Italian International chess master.

He was born in Trieste, Italy, and learned chess when he was nine years old. For many years, he was one of the leading Italian chess players. He was the winner of international tournaments in Vienna (1951) and Imperia (1959). Paoli won his last Italian Championship at age 60, and organized the famous Reggio Emilia chess tournament. He beat Soviet GM Alexander Kotov with the black pieces in Venice in 1950, but missed receiving the Grandmaster title by only half a point at a tournament in 1969. He was awarded an honorary grandmaster title in 1996 by FIDE.
