= Ennio Contedini =

Italian chess player (born 1934)

Personal information
- Born: 8 October 1934 (age 91) Milan, Italy

Chess career
- Country: Italy

Ennio Contedini (born 8 October 1934) was an Italian chess player, Italian Chess Championship winner (1963).

== Biography ==
From the end of 1950s to the begin 1970s, Ennio Contedini was one of Italy's leading chess players. He achieved his first major success by winning the International Chess Tournament in Zürich in 1961, ahead of Otto Zimmermann and Paul Johner. In the same year Ennio Contedini with Società Scacchistica Milanese team won Italian Team Chess Championship. In 1963, in Imperia he won Italian Chess Championship.

Ennio Contedini played for Italy in the Chess Olympiads:

- In 1958, at second reserve board in the 13th Chess Olympiad in Munich (+4, =3, -5),
- In 1960, at first board in the 14th Chess Olympiad in Leipzig (+5, =5, -6).

Ennio Contedini played for Italy in the Clare Benedict Chess Cup:

- In 1964, at first board in the 11th Clare Benedict Chess Cup in Lenzerheide (+0, =3, -2).

Ennio Contedini played for Italy in the Men's Chess Mitropa Cup:

- In 1976, at first board in the 1st Chess Mitropa Cup in Innsbruck (+0, =1, -2).
