= Antonio Sacconi =

Italian chess player

Antonio Sacconi (5 October 1895 – 22 December 1968) was an Italian chess master.

Born into a noble family in Rome, he won torneo del Caffè Balbo after play-off match against Bernheimer (+3 −0 =1) in 1917, drew a match with Stefano Rosselli del Turco (+1 −1 =4) in 1918, both in Rome, and won a match against Mario Monticelli (+5 −3 =2) at Venice 1926.

He won Italian Chess Championship at Florence 1935, shared 4th at Florence 1936, and took 4th at Naples 1937.

In international tournaments, he won at Milan 1926 (the 4th torneo Crespi), tied for 2nd-3rd with George Alan Thomas, behind Rudolf Spielmann, at Sopron 1934, and took 2nd at Margate 1937 (B tournament).

Sacconi represented Italy in Chess Olympiads:

- In the 1st Olympiad at London 1927 (+5 −4 =6);
- In the 2nd Olympiad at The Hague 1928 (+2 −3 =8);
- In the 5th Olympiad at Folkestone 1933 (+3 −4 =2);
- In the 6th Olympiad at Warsaw 1935 (+3 −9 =2).

He was awarded the International Master title in 1951. Sacconi died in Rome.
