= Pier Luigi Basso =

Italian chess grandmaster (born 1997)

Personal information
- Born: December 15, 1997 (age 28) Montebelluna, Italy

Chess career
- Country: Italy
- Title: Grandmaster (2018)
- FIDE rating: 2500 (July 2026)
- Peak rating: 2603 (September 2020)

Pier Luigi Basso (born December 15, 1997) is an Italian chess grandmaster. He became a FIDE master (FM) in 2013 and an international master (IM) in 2016. He received the grandmaster (GM) title in 2018.

== Notable tournaments ==
| Tournament Name | Year | ELO | Points |
|---|---|---|---|
| Cattolica Chess Open A (Cattolica) | 2022 | 2558 | 2.0 |
| 80th ch-ITA 2021 (Chianciano Term) | 2021 | 2581 | 9.0 |
| Third Saturday Mix 224(Novi Sad SRB) | 2021 | 2566 | 6.0 |
| Third Saturday Mix 217(Novi Sad SRB) | 2021 | 2551 | 11.0 |
| Third Sat Mix 158 2021(Novi Sad SRB) | 2021 | 2553 | 7.0 |
| GMT Banicky kahanec 2020(Bojnice SVK) | 2020 | 2570 | 6.0 |
| 2nd Citta di Imola Open(Imola ITA) | 2019 | 2584 | 4.5 |
| 25th Cutro Open 2019(Cutro ITA) | 2019 | 2576 | 7.0 |
| 25th Venetian Autumn 2018(Venice ITA) | 2018 | 2529 | 4.5 |
| 16th Amantea Open 2018( Amantea ITA) | 2018 | 2516 | 7.0 |
| 15th Spilimbergo Open( Spilimbergo ITA) | 2017 | 2459 | 6.5 |
| 1st FideAcademy GM 2016(Spoleto ITA) | 2016 | 2466 | 6.5 |
