= Stefano Tatai =

Italian chess player (1938–2017)

Personal information
- Full name: Stefano Tatai
- Born: 23 March 1938 Rome
- Died: 29 May 2017 (aged 79) Tenerife

Chess career
- Country: Italy
- Title: International Master (1966)
- Years active: 1950s - 2013
- Peak rating: 2495 (January 1981)
- Peak ranking: 92= (January 1981)

Stefano Tatai (23 May 1938 in Rome – 29 May 2017 in Tenerife) was an Italian chess master. He was of Hungarian descent. He was awarded the Italian national master title in 1958, and the International Master title in 1966. He was twelve times Italian champion, in 1962, 1965, 1967, 1970, 1974, 1977, 1979, 1983, 1985, 1990, 1991 and 1994.

During the 1950s, he coached composer Ennio Morricone, who became a strong chess player.

== Bibliography ==
- Le gambit Jaenisch : une défense active contre l'Espagnole [The Jaenisch Gambit : an active defence against the Spanish]. Diffec. 1978. OCLC 10513313.
- Tatai insegna la Najdorf [Tatai teaches the Najdorf]. Cesena. 2008. ISBN 978-8-8887-5665-3.
