= Sabino Brunello =

Italian chess grandmaster (born 1989)

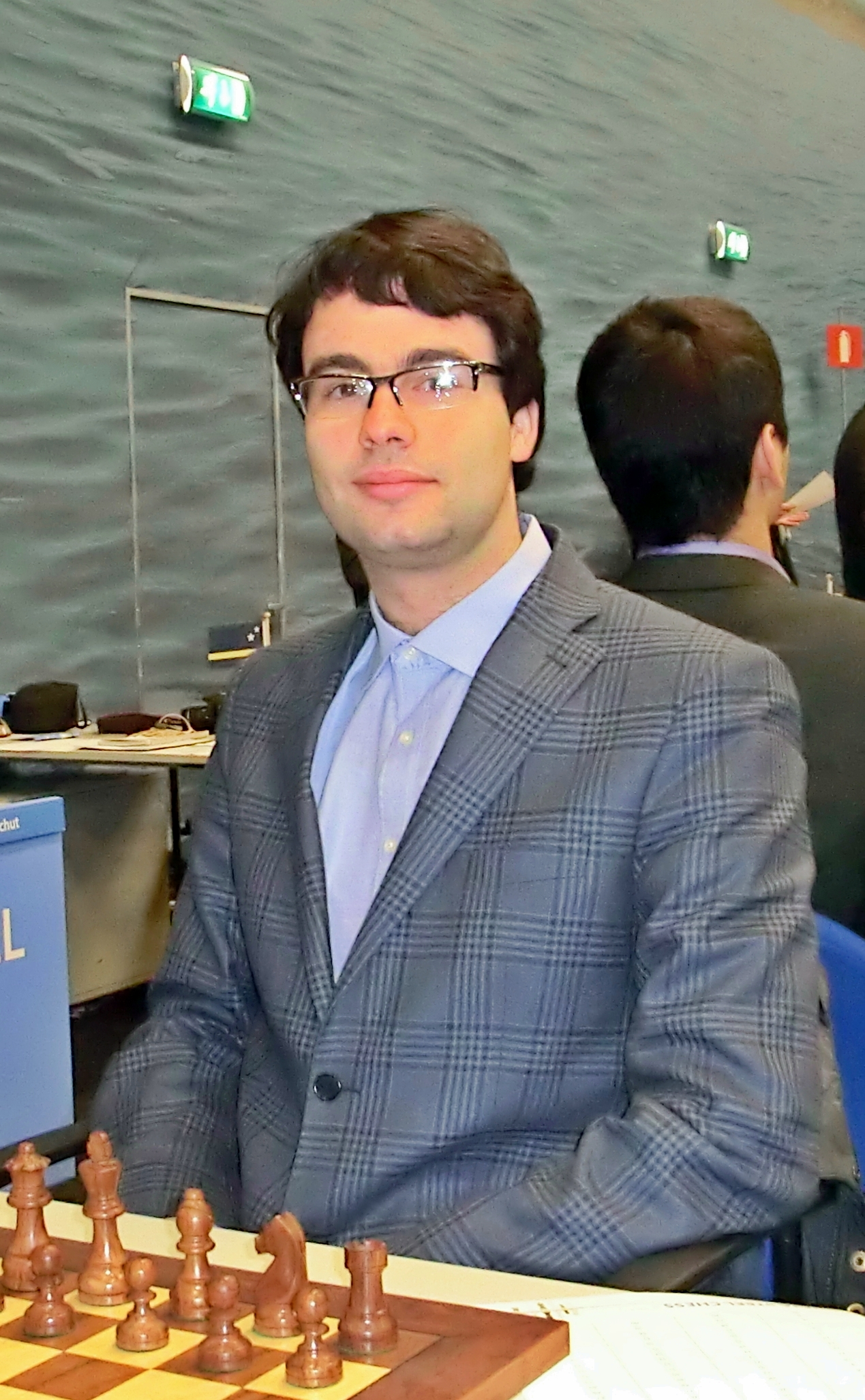
- Sabino Brunello in 2013

Personal information
- Born: 27 June 1989 (age 37) Brescia, Italy

Chess career
- Country: Italy
- Title: Grandmaster (2010)
- FIDE rating: 2535 (July 2026)
- Peak rating: 2617 (September 2013)

Sabino Brunello (born 27 June 1989) is an Italian chess player. He was awarded the title of Grandmaster by FIDE in 2010.

== Chess career ==
Sabino Brunello started to play chess at the age of 8. In 2002, in Bratto, he became the Italian champion in the age category Under 18. In 2007 in Martina Franca he won silver medal in the Italian Chess Championship. In 2010 in Arvier he took the silver medal in the European Union Championship. In 2014, in Durban, Brunello shared first place with Sahaj Grover in the Open Grandmasters Tournament. In 2013 Brunello competed in the FIDE World Cup, where he lost to Pavel Eljanov in the first round.

Sabino Brunello played for Italy in the Chess Olympiad:

- In 2006, at third board in the 37th Chess Olympiad in Turin (+5, =3, -2),
- In 2008, at fourth board in the 38th Chess Olympiad in Dresden (+3, =4, -2),
- In 2010, at fourth board in the 39th Chess Olympiad in Khanty-Mansiysk (+5, =2, -2),
- In 2012, at third board in the 40th Chess Olympiad in Istanbul (+4, =4, -1),
- In 2014, at fourth board in the 41st Chess Olympiad in Tromsø (+4, =2, -3),
- In 2016, at fourth board in the 42nd Chess Olympiad in Baku (+3, =5, -2).

Sabino Brunello played for Italy in the European Team Chess Championship:

- In 2007, at third board in the 16th European Team Chess Championship in Heraklion (+3, =3, -2),
- In 2011, at fourth board in the 18th European Team Chess Championship in Porto Carras (+4, =3, -1),
- In 2013, at second board in the 19th European Team Chess Championship in Warsaw (+1, =2, -3),
- In 2015, at second board in the 20th European Team Chess Championship in Reykjavík (+1, =4, -2).

In 2007, he was awarded the title of International Master (IM) by FIDE and received the title of Grandmaster (GM) three year later. His youngest sister is Marina Brunello.

== Publications ==
- Brunello, Sabino (2009). Attacking the Spanish. Quality Chess. ISBN 978-1906552176.
- Brunello, Sabino; Garrett, Yuri; Rombaldoni, Axel (2014). Saint Louis 2014 - Sinquefield Cup. Il torneo di Fabiano Caruana (in Italian). Caissa Italia. ISBN 978-8867290079.
