= Bogo-Indian Defence =

Position: a8 black rook, b8 black knight, c8 black bishop, d8 black queen, e8 black king, h8 black rook, a7 black pawn, b7 black pawn, c7 black pawn, d7 black pawn, f7 black pawn, g7 black pawn, h7 black pawn, e6 black pawn, f6 black knight, b4 black bishop, c4 white pawn, d4 white pawn, f3 white knight, a2 white pawn, b2 white pawn, e2 white pawn, f2 white pawn, g2 white pawn, h2 white pawn, a1 white rook, b1 white knight, c1 white bishop, d1 white queen, e1 white king, f1 white bishop, h1 white rook
- Moves: 1.d4 Nf6 2.c4 e6 3.Nf3 Bb4+
- ECO: E11
- Named after: Efim Bogoljubow
- Parent: Indian Defence

The Bogo-Indian Defence is a chess opening characterised by the moves:

1. d4 Nf6
2. c4 e6
3. Nf3 Bb4+

The position after 1.d4 Nf6 2.c4 e6 is common. The traditional move for White here is 3.Nc3, threatening to set up a big pawn centre with 4.e4. However, 3.Nf3 is often played instead as a way of avoiding the Nimzo-Indian Defence (which would follow after 3.Nc3 Bb4). After 3.Nf3, Black usually plays 3...b6 (the Queen's Indian Defence) or 3...d5 (transposing to the Queen's Gambit Declined), but can instead play 3...Bb4+, the Bogo-Indian Defence. Databases suggest that the Bogo-Indian is played approximately half as often as the Queen's Indian.

The Bogo-Indian Defence can also arise via the move order 1.d4 e6 2.c4 Bb4+, the Keres Defence.

The Bogo-Indian is classified as E11 by the Encyclopaedia of Chess Openings (ECO). The name comes from an abbreviation of 20th century grandmaster Efim Bogoljubow's name.

== History ==
The Bogo-Indian Defence is named after the Russian-born German master Efim Bogoljubow who is believed to have originated the opening and played it regularly in the 1920s. Subsequent prominent players to have adopted the Bogo-Indian include Aron Nimzowitsch, Paul Keres, Tigran Petrosian, Bent Larsen, Vasily Smyslov, Viktor Korchnoi, Ulf Andersson, Michael Adams and Nikita Vitiugov.

== Variations ==
White has three viable moves to meet the check. 4.Nc3 is a transposition to the Kasparov Variation of the Nimzo-Indian; therefore, the main independent variations are 4.Bd2 and 4.Nbd2.

=== 4.Bd2 ===
4.Bd2 is the most common line; the bishop on b4 is now threatened and Black must decide how to meet this threat.

Position: a8 black rook, c8 black bishop, f8 black rook, g8 black king, a7 black pawn, b7 black pawn, c7 black pawn, e7 black queen, f7 black pawn, g7 black pawn, h7 black pawn, d6 black pawn, e6 black knight, c4 white pawn, e4 black knight, c3 white bishop, f3 white knight, g3 white pawn, a2 white pawn, b2 white pawn, e2 white pawn, f2 white pawn, g2 white bishop, h2 white pawn, c1 white rook, d1 white queen, e1 white king, h1 white rook

4.Bd2 Qe7 mainline, position after 11...Nxe6
- 4...Qe7 is now the most frequently played option. After 5. g3 Nc6, the main line continues 6. Nc3 Bxc3 7. Bxc3 Ne4 8. Rc1 0-0 9. Bg2 d6 10. d5 Nd8 11. dxe6 Nxe6 and the position is equal (see diagram). An alternative line is 6. Bg2 Bxd2+ 7. Nbxd2 d6 8. 0-0 a5 9. e4 e5 10. d5 Nb8 11. Ne1 0-0 12. Nd3 Na6 and the position is again equal.
- David Bronstein tried the sharper alternative 4...a5, grabbing space on the queenside at the cost of structural weaknesses.
- The simplest is to trade off the bishop by means of 4...Bxd2+; this line is not particularly popular, but has been played frequently by the Swedish grandmaster Ulf Andersson, often as a drawing line.
- A more modern line is 4...c5, after 5.Bxb4 cxb4, Black's pawns are doubled, and a pawn has been pulled away from the centre, but the b4 pawn can also be annoying for White since it takes the c3-square away from the knight. In fact, one of White's major alternatives is 6.a3, trading off this pawn at once.
- Simply retreating the bishop by means of 4...Be7 is also possible; Black benefits from losing a tempo since White's dark-square bishop is misplaced at d2. The line is somewhat passive, but solid.

=== 4.Nbd2 ===
4.Nbd2 is an alternative aiming to acquire the bishop for the knight or forcing Black's bishop to retreat. The downside is that the knight is developed to a square where it blocks the bishop, and d2 is a less active square than c3. The line is described in the Gambit Guide as "ambitious". Black's most common replies are 4...b6, 4...0-0, and 4...d5.

=== Monticelli Trap ===
This opening can sometimes give rise to the Monticelli Trap.

== See also ==
- List of chess openings
- List of chess openings named after people
