= Jean-Pierre Le Roux (chess player) =

French chess grandmaster (born 1982)

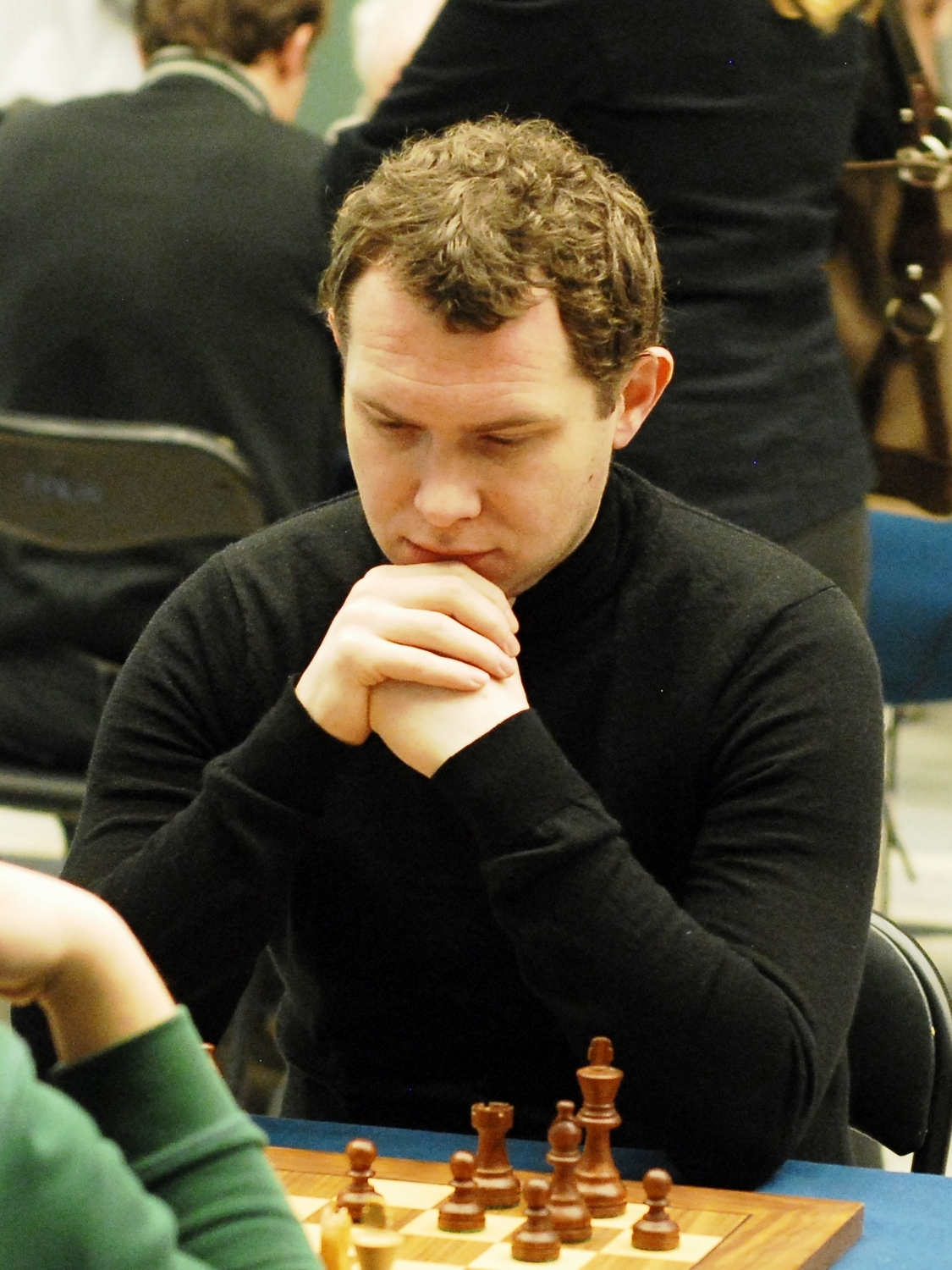
- Le Roux in 2012

Personal information
- Born: 18 May 1982 (age 44) Guingamp, France

Chess career
- Country: France
- Title: Grandmaster (2010)
- FIDE rating: 2448 (November 2026)
- Peak rating: 2595 (July 2013)

Jean-Pierre Le Roux (French: [ʒɑ̃ pjɛʁ lə ʁu]; born 18 May 1982) is a French chess player. He was awarded a grandmaster title in 2010, an International master in 2004 and a FIDE master in 2003 from FIDE. He is ranked 16th in France. He won the 43rd Guernsey International Chess Festival in 2017 and the French rapid chess championship in 2018.
