= Reggio Emilia chess tournament =

Italian event (1947–2012)

The Reggio Emilia chess tournament was an annual chess tournament held in Reggio Emilia, Italy. In Italian the tournament is called Torneo di Capodanno (New Year's tournament), as it used to start just after Christmas and end on the day of Epiphany (6 January). It was established as an annual event in 1958 by grandmaster Enrico Paoli. In 1982/83 the tournament attracted a new sponsor and by the 1990s the tournament had gained significant international reputation, climaxing in the 1991/1992 edition. This was the first Category 18 tournament ever played; it was won by the 22-year-old Viswanathan Anand ahead of Garry Kasparov, Anatoly Karpov and Vassily Ivanchuk.

It was Italy's oldest and most renowned chess tournament. The tournament was usually played as a 10 to 16 player round-robin tournament. The announced 55th edition had to be canceled due to economic reasons.

== Winners ==
#	Year	Winner
	1947	Esteban Canal (PER)
-	1951	Moshe Czerniak (ISR)
1	1958–59	Otto Marthaler (SUI)
2	1959–60	Cveto Trampuz (YUG)
3	1960–61	Péter Dely (HUN)
4	1961–62	Alberto Mario Giustolisi (ITA)
5	1962–63	Győző Forintos (HUN)
6	1963–64	Rudolf Teschner (GER)
7	1964–65	Mario Bertok (YUG)
8	1965–66	Bruno Parma (YUG)
9	1966–67	Victor Ciocâltea (ROM)
10	1967–68	Milan Matulović (YUG)
11	1968–69	Ladislav Mista (CZE)
12	1969–70	Sergio Mariotti (ITA)
13	1970–71	Bruno Parma (YUG)
14	1971–72	Andrew Soltis (USA)
15	1972–73	Levente Lengyel (HUN)
16	1973–74	Luben Popov (BUL)
17	1974–75	Orestes Rodríguez Vargas (PER)
18	1975–76	Luděk Pachman (GER)
19	1976–77	Gennadi Kuzmin (RUS)
20	1977–78	László M. Kovács (HUN)
21	1978–79	Ralf Hess (GER)
22	1979–80	Alexander Kochyev (RUS)
23	1980–81	Nils Renman (SWE)
24	1981–82	Arne Dür (AUT)
25	1982–83	Nona Gaprindashvili (URS)
26	1983–84	Karel Mokry (TCH)
27	1984–85	Lajos Portisch (HUN)
28	1985–86	Ulf Andersson (SWE)
29	1986–87	Zoltán Ribli (HUN)
30	1987–88	Vladimir Tukmakov (URS)
31	1988–89	Mikhail Gurevich (URS)
32	1989–90	Jaan Ehlvest (URS)
33	1990–91	Anatoly Karpov (URS)
34	1991–92	Viswanathan Anand (IND)
35	1992–93	Rafael Vaganian (ARM)
36	1993–94	Lajos Portisch (HUN)
37	1994–95	Rafael Vaganian (ARM)
38	1995–96	Yuri Razuvayev (RUS)
39	1996–97	Michał Krasenkow (POL)
40	1997–98	Dimitri Komarov (UKR)
41	1998–99	Evgeniy Solozhenkin (RUS)
42	1999–00	Leonid Yudasin (ISR)
43	2000–01	Oleg Romanishin (UKR)
44	2001–02	Vladimir Georgiev (BUL)
45	2002–03	Jean-Luc Chabanon (FRA)
46	2003–04	Igor Miladinović (GRE)
47	2004–05	Aleksander Delchev (BUL)
48	2005–06	Konstantin Landa (RUS)
49	2006–07	Viorel Iordăchescu (MDA)
50	2007–08	Zoltán Almási (HUN)
51	2008–09	Ni Hua (CHN)
52	2009–10	Gata Kamsky (USA)
53	2010–11	Vugar Gashimov (AZE)
54	2011–12	Anish Giri (NED)

== See also ==
- Hastings International Chess Congress
