= Arturo Reggio =

Italian chess player

Arturo Reggio (9 January 1863 – 17 July 1917) was an Italian chess player.

Born in Gorizia, then the Austrian Empire, he started playing chess as an engineering student at the Graz University of Technology and at the Imperial-Royal Polytechnic Institute of Vienna, both in Austria. After he settled in Milan in the 1890s, he joined the Societá Scacchistica Milanese and edited a chess column for the magazine La Bicicletta, since 1898.

At the beginning of the 20th century, Reggio was an unofficial Italian Chess Champion. He won five times in the strongest national tournaments: at Rome 1900 (1st Torneo dell'USI), Venice 1901 (2nd Torneo dell'USI), Florence 1905 (3rd Torneo dell'USI), Bologna 1913 (2nd Torneo "L'Italia Scacchistica"), and Milan 1916 (1st Torneo Nazionale "Crespi").

He also took 3rd at Milan 1906 (4th Torneo dell'USI, Giovanni Martinolich won), took 3rd at Rome 1911 (5th Torneo dell'USI, Matteo Gladig won), won at Bologna 1912 (torneo interregionale) and won at Milan 1912 (torneo cittadino).

Reggio played in several international tournaments where took 11th at Monte Carlo 1901 (Dawid Janowski won), took 19th at Monte Carlo 1902 (Géza Maróczy won), took 13th at Monte Carlo 1903 (Siegbert Tarrasch won), tied for 7-8th at Barmen 1905 (Masters B, Leo Fleischmann won), took 8th at Scheveningen 1905 (Frank James Marshall won), took 9th at Ostend 1906 (elim., Carl Schlechter won).

He died in Milan.
