= 28th Chess Olympiad =

1988 chess tournament in Thessaloniki, Greece

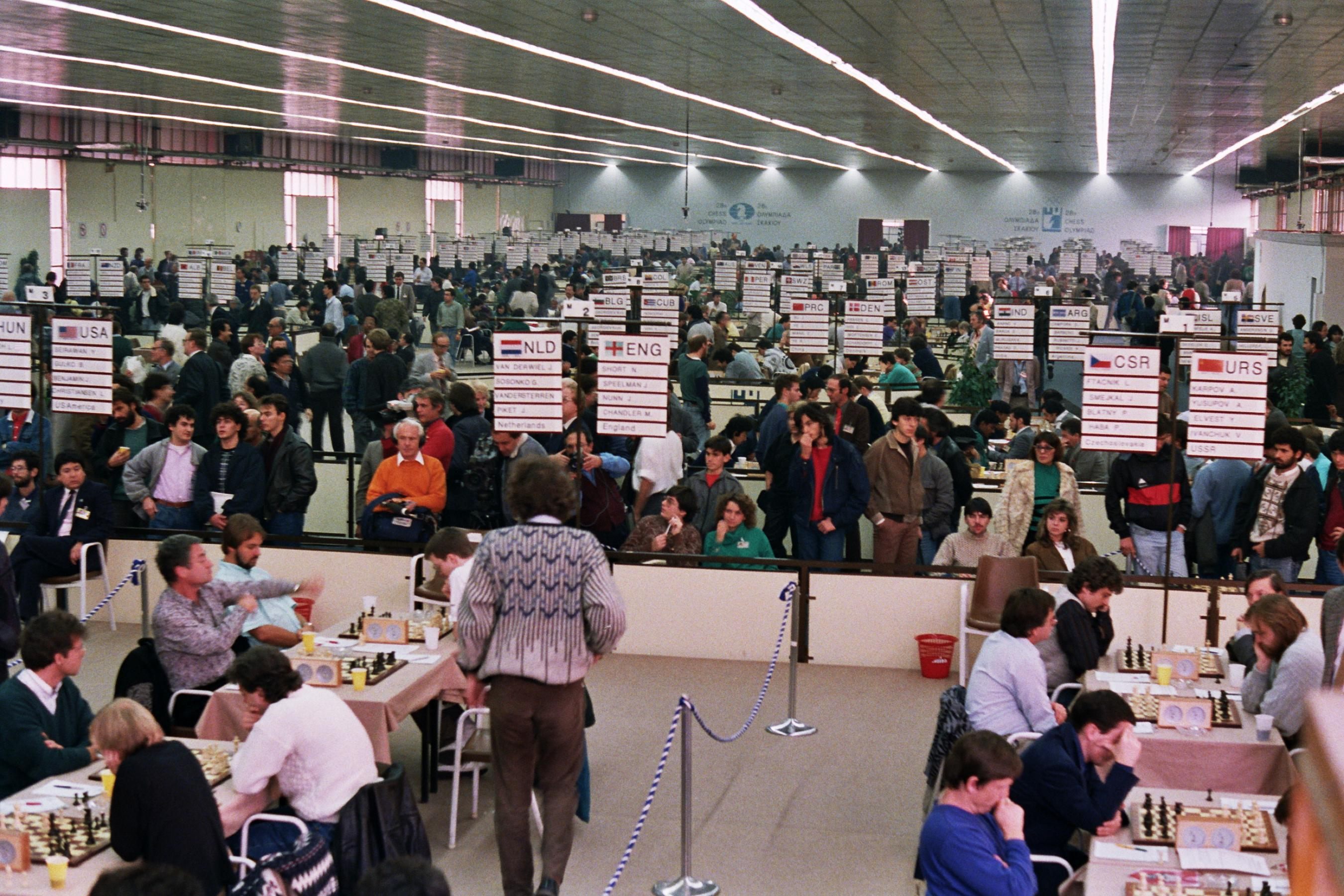
28th Chess Olympiad

The 28th Chess Olympiad (Greek: Η 28η Σκακιστική Ολυμπιάδα, I 28i Skakistikí Olympiáda), organized by FIDE and comprising an open and a women's tournament, as well as several other events designed to promote the game of chess, took place between November 12 and November 30, 1988, in Thessaloniki, Greece.

After the successful 26th Olympiad in Thessaloniki in 1984, FIDE had agreed to hold every other Olympiad (the ones in Olympic years) in the home country of the Olympic movement - provided the Greek Chess Federation and government could provide the necessary funding. This was only the case once, in 1988; after that the Olympiad went back to a new host city every two years.

Israel was back, having been effectively banned from the previous Olympiad in Dubai, as were the countries that had stayed away in sympathy: The Netherlands, Denmark, Sweden, and Norway. Also reappearing in the Olympic arena—after a 16-year absence—was East Germany, who celebrated their return by beating their West German rivals 3–1.

The Soviet Union dominated as usual. With world champions Kasparov (reigning) and Karpov (former) on the top boards, they won by no less than six points. A strong English team took their third consecutive silver medals, while the returning Dutch team took the bronze.

== Open event ==
There were 107 teams from 106 different nations playing in a 14-round Swiss system tournament. Chile had also been signed up, but never arrived.

In the event of a draw, the tie-break was decided first by using the Buchholz system, then by match points.

Open event
| # | Country | Players | Average rating | Points | Buchholz |
|---|---|---|---|---|---|
| 1 | Soviet Union | Kasparov, Karpov, Yusupov, Beliavsky, Ehlvest, Ivanchuk | 2694 | 40½ | |
| 2 | England | Short, Speelman, Nunn, Chandler, Mestel, Watson | 2635 | 34½ | 457.0 |
| 3 | Netherlands | Van der Wiel, Sosonko, Van der Sterren, Piket, Kuijf, Douven | 2513 | 34½ | 455.0 |

| # | Country | Average rating | Points | Buchholz | MP |
|---|---|---|---|---|---|
| 4 | United States | 2580 | 34 | 459.0 | |
| 5 | Hungary | 2604 | 34 | 456.5 | |
| 6 | Yugoslavia | 2574 | 33½ | | |
| 7 | Philippines | 2435 | 33 | 449.5 | |
| 8 | China | 2441 | 33 | 447.0 | |
| 9 | Cuba | 2520 | 33 | 439.5 | |
| 10 | Argentina | 2486 | 33 | 434.5 | |
| 11 | Israel | 2481 | 33 | 432.5 | |
| 12 | Sweden | 2538 | 32½ | 458.0 | |
| 13 | Czechoslovakia | 2518 | 32½ | 446.0 | |
| 14 | Italy | 2420 | 32½ | 423.0 | |
| 15 | Iceland | 2550 | 32 | 449.5 | |
| 16 | Denmark | 2475 | 32 | 449.0 | |
| 17 | East Germany | 2508 | 32 | 444.5 | |
| 18 | West Germany | 2540 | 32 | 435.5 | |
| 19 | India | 2466 | 32 | 393.5 | |
| 20 | Switzerland | 2480 | 31½ | 423.0 | |
| 21 | Poland | 2460 | 31½ | 419.0 | 17 |
| 22 | Spain | 2479 | 31½ | 419.0 | 13 |
| 23 | Brazil | 2406 | 31½ | 416.0 | |
| 24 | Bulgaria | 2520 | 31 | 449.0 | |
| 25 | Romania | 2476 | 31 | 441.0 | |
| 26 | Indonesia | 2453 | 31 | 431.5 | |
| 27 | Greece | 2449 | 31 | 419.0 | |
| 28 | Austria | 2415 | 31 | 411.0 | |
| 29 | Guatemala | 2251 | 31 | 325.0 | |
| 30 | Scotland | 2383 | 30½ | 431.0 | |
| 31 | France | 2473 | 30½ | 429.5 | |
| 32 | Finland | 2420 | 30½ | 421.0 | |
| 33 | Albania | 2364 | 30½ | 415.0 | |
| 34 | Belgium | 2388 | 30½ | 412.0 | |
| 35 | Colombia | 2406 | 30 | 431.5 | |
| 36 | Peru | 2460 | 30 | 428.0 | |
| 37 | Canada | 2439 | 30 | 411.0 | |
| 38 | New Zealand | 2321 | 30 | 405.0 | |
| 39 | Paraguay | 2354 | 30 | 365.5 | |
| 40 | Australia | 2414 | 29½ | 412.0 | |
| 41 | Venezuela | 2261 | 29½ | 376.0 | |
| 42 | Thailand | 2280 | 29½ | 368.5 | |
| 43 | Norway | 2450 | 29 | 418.5 | |
| 44 | Mexico | 2398 | 29 | 413.0 | |
| 45 | Dominican Republic | 2348 | 29 | 412.0 | |
| 46 | Wales | 2290 | 29 | 411.0 | |
| 47 | Singapore | 2280 | 29 | 410.5 | |
| 48 | Egypt | 2250 | 29 | 401.5 | |
| 49 | Uruguay | 2284 | 29 | 394.5 | |
| 50 | Ireland | 2260 | 28½ | 403.0 | |
| 51 | Syria | 2278 | 28½ | 391.5 | |
| 52 | Turkey | 2305 | 28 | 403.0 | |
| 53 | Luxembourg | 2221 | 28 | 373.0 | |
| 54 | Portugal | 2381 | 27½ | 410.0 | |
| 55 | Greece "B" | 2288 | 27½ | 407.0 | |
| 56 | Pakistan | 2345 | 27½ | 403.5 | |
| 57 | Faroe Islands | 2270 | 27½ | 395.0 | |
| 58 | Malaysia | 2211 | 27½ | 393.0 | |
| 59 | Puerto Rico | 2239 | 27½ | 391.0 | |
| 60 | Morocco | 2201 | 27½ | 390.0 | |
| 61 | Angola | 2200 | 27½ | 381.0 | |
| 62 | Costa Rica | 2240 | 27½ | 380.5 | |
| 63 | Bangladesh | 2293 | 27½ | 377.5 | |
| 64 | Bolivia | 2230 | 27½ | 371.0 | |
| 65 | Jamaica | 2231 | 27 | 375.5 | |
| 66 | Algeria | 2200 | 27 | 372.5 | |
| 67 | Japan | 2203 | 26½ | 390.0 | |
| 68 | United Arab Emirates | 2209 | 26½ | 383.0 | |
| 69 | Barbados | 2206 | 26½ | 377.5 | |
| 70 | Nigeria | 2201 | 26½ | 368.5 | |
| 71 | Libya | 2201 | 26½ | 361.0 | |
| 72 | Zimbabwe | 2204 | 26½ | 344.0 | |
| 73 | El Salvador | 2228 | 26 | 383.5 | |
| 74 | Cyprus | 2203 | 26 | 371.0 | |
| 75 | Qatar | 2233 | 26 | 354.5 | |
| 76 | Malta | 2200 | 26 | 347.5 | |
| 77 | Jordan | 2210 | 25½ | 376.0 | |
| 78 | Lebanon | 2234 | 25½ | 369.5 | |
| 79 | Honduras | 2200 | 25½ | 364.0 | |
| 80 | Suriname | 2200 | 25½ | 279.5 | |
| 81 | Zambia | 2201 | 25 | 356.0 | |
| 82 | Senegal | 2201 | 25 | 334.0 | |
| 83 | Botswana | 2200 | 25 | 322.0 | |
| 84 | Hong Kong | 2226 | 24½ | 382.0 | |
| 85 | Bahrain | 2201 | 24½ | 372.0 | |
| 86 | Andorra | 2210 | 24½ | 371.5 | |
| 87 | North Yemen | 2201 | 24½ | 360.0 | |
| 88 | Palestine | 2206 | 24½ | 359.5 | |
| 89 | Netherlands Antilles | 2201 | 24½ | 350.0 | |
| 90 | Mauritania | 2203 | 24½ | 305.5 | |
| 91 | Haiti | 2204 | 24 | 350.0 | |
| 92 | Panama | 2200 | 24 | 317.0 | |
| 93 | Liechtenstein | 2200 | 24 | 295.0 | |
| 94 | Monaco | 2200 | 24 | 293.5 | |
| 95 | Uganda | 2203 | 23½ | 372.5 | |
| 96 | San Marino | 2201 | 23½ | 365.0 | |
| 97 | Mali | 2203 | 23½ | 288.5 | |
| 98 | Guernsey and Jersey | 2220 | 23 | 327.5 | |
| 99 | Sudan | 2203 | 23 | 315.5 | |
| 100 | British Virgin Islands | 2200 | 23 | 295.5 | |
| 101 | Kenya | 2203 | 22½ | 346.0 | |
| 102 | United States Virgin Islands | 2200 | 22½ | 293.0 | |
| 103 | Bermuda | 2201 | 21 | | |
| 104 | Bahamas | 2201 | 18 | | |
| 105 | Mauritius | 2201 | 16 | | |
| 106 | Fiji | 2201 | 14 | | |
| 107 | Seychelles | 2200 | 10 | | |

=== Individual medals ===
- Performance rating: (Soviet Union) Garry Kasparov 2877
- Board 1: (Soviet Union) Garry Kasparov 8½ / 10 = 85.0%
- Board 2: (Soviet Union) Anatoly Karpov 8 / 10 = 80.0%
- Board 3: (Guatemala) Carlos Antonio Reyes Nájera 7½ / 10 = 75.0%
- Board 4: (Thailand) Suchart Chaivichit 8 / 9 = 88.9%
- 1st reserve: (Italy) Ennio Arlandi and (El Salvador) Eduardo Vásquez 5½ / 7 = 78.6%
- 2nd reserve: (Bangladesh) Tahmidur Rahman and (Argentina) Jorge Gómez Baillo 6 / 7 = 85.7%

=== Best combination ===
The 'Best combination' prize went to Carsten Høi (Denmark) - Boris Gulko (USA) from round 4.

== Women's event ==
56 teams from 55 different nations took part. In the event of a draw, the tie-break was decided first by using the Buchholz system, then by match points.

The Soviet Union had won 10 of the previous 11 Olympiads, but this time they were bested by a Hungarian teenage team featuring 19-year-old Mádl as well as all three Polgár sisters: Zsuzsa (also 19), Zsófia (14), and Judit (12). The biggest star of the women's event was 12-year-old prodigy Judit, who scored 12½ points in 13 games and won her board as well as the overall performance rating.

| # | Country | Players | Average rating | Points |
|---|---|---|---|---|
| 1 | Hungary | Zsuzsa Polgár, J. Polgár, Mádl, Zsófia Polgár | 2400 | 33 |
| 2 | Soviet Union | Chiburdanidze, Akhmilovskaya, Levitina, Litinskaya | 2455 | 32½ |
| 3 | Yugoslavia | Marić, Marković, Maksimović, Bašagić | 2300 | 28 |

| # | Country | Average rating | Points | Buchholz |
|---|---|---|---|---|
| 4 | China | 2095 | 27 | |
| 5 | Bulgaria | 2275 | 24 | 344.5 |
| 6 | Romania | 2267 | 24 | 344.0 |
| 7 | Greece | 2207 | 24 | 343.0 |
| 8 | Cuba | 2170 | 24 | 336.5 |
| 9 | United States | 2278 | 23½ | 342.5 |
| 10 | Netherlands | 2203 | 23½ | 319.5 |
| 11 | Poland | 2282 | 23 | 349.5 |
| 12 | England | 2300 | 23 | 322.5 |
| 13 | France | 2160 | 23 | 317.0 |
| 14 | India | 2128 | 23 | 316.0 |
| 15 | West Germany | 2277 | 22½ | 333.5 |
| 16 | Argentina | 2130 | 22½ | 315.5 |
| 17 | Spain | 2200 | 22½ | 312.5 |
| 18 | Israel | 2228 | 22½ | 311.5 |
| 19 | Denmark | 2123 | 22½ | 303.5 |
| 20 | Brazil | 2073 | 22½ | 302.5 |
| 21 | Switzerland | 2115 | 22 | 309.0 |
| 22 | Philippines | 2205 | 22 | 259.5 |
| 23 | Czechoslovakia | 2242 | 21½ | 343.0 |
| 24 | Sweden | 2240 | 21½ | 329.5 |
| 25 | Greece "B" | 2013 | 21½ | 297.0 |
| 26 | Canada | 2125 | 21½ | 296.0 |
| 27 | Colombia | 2088 | 21½ | 295.0 |
| 28 | Dominican Republic | 2002 | 21½ | 294.5 |
| 29 | Ireland | 2012 | 21½ | 291.0 |
| 30 | Finland | 2000 | 21½ | 286.0 |
| 31 | Mexico | 2003 | 21½ | 283.0 |
| 32 | New Zealand | 2005 | 21½ | 271.0 |
| 33 | Austria | 2088 | 21 | 313.5 |
| 34 | Australia | 2023 | 21 | 309.0 |
| 35 | Belgium | 2008 | 21 | 296.5 |
| 36 | Indonesia | 2035 | 21 | 285.0 |
| 37 | Italy | 2010 | 21 | 276.0 |
| 38 | Uruguay | 2003 | 21 | 253.0 |
| 39 | Venezuela | 2013 | 20½ | 302.0 |
| 40 | Norway | 2025 | 20½ | 286.0 |
| 41 | Wales | 2075 | 20½ | 277.5 |
| 42 | Bangladesh | 2000 | 20½ | 267.5 |
| 43 | Portugal | 2000 | 20 | 275.5 |
| 44 | Turkey | 2000 | 20 | 262.0 |
| 45 | Scotland | 2012 | 19½ | |
| 46 | Malaysia | 2018 | 19 | 280.5 |
| 47 | Jamaica | 2002 | 19 | 238.0 |
| 48 | Puerto Rico | 2003 | 19 | 236.0 |
| 49 | Nigeria | 2002 | 17 | 234.0 |
| 50 | Lebanon | 2000 | 17 | 229.5 |
| 51 | Barbados | 2000 | 16½ | |
| 52 | Zimbabwe | 2000 | 14½ | |
| 53 | Netherlands Antilles | 2000 | 14 | |
| 54 | Malta | 2000 | 12½ | |
| 55 | Seychelles | 2000 | 8 | |
| 56 | United States Virgin Islands | 2000 | 2½ | |

=== Individual medals ===
- Performance rating: (Hungary) Judit Polgár 2694
- Board 1: (Sweden) Pia Cramling 12½ / 14 = 89.3%
- Board 2: (Hungary) Judit Polgár 12½ / 13 = 96.2%
- Board 3: (China) Peng Zhaoqin (10½/14) and (Austria) Maria Horvath (9/12) = 75.0%
- Reserve: (Bangladesh) Yesmin Begum 6½ / 8 = 81.3%
