= Axel Rombaldoni =

Italian chess grandmaster (born 1992)

Personal information
- Born: March 23, 1992 (age 34) Pesaro, Italy

Chess career
- Country: Italy
- Title: Grandmaster (2013)
- FIDE rating: 2531 (October 2026)
- Peak rating: 2567 (July 2016)

Axel Rombaldoni (born 23 March 1992) is an Italian chess grandmaster.

== Chess career ==
In 2011, he played in the U20 section of the World Junior Chess Championship, where he led the tournament after the 7th round and had won every game in the first 6 rounds. He ultimately finished with 8/13.

In June 2013, he won the Festival Capo d'Orso in Porto Mannu, Sardinia, earning his final GM norm.

He was awarded the Grandmaster title in 2013, after achieving his norms at the:

- U20 World Junior Chess Championship in August 2011
- Festival Internationale des Jeux in February 2012
- Capo d'Orso in June 2013
