= Federico Norcia =

Italian chess player

Federico Norcia (31 March 1904, Lugo di Romagna – 15 July 1985, Modena) was an Italian chess master.

He played several times in the Italian Chess Championship, and took 2nd, behind Mario Monticelli, at Milan 1935, tied for 4-5th at Florence 1935, shared 1st at Ferrara 1952, and shared 1st at Perugia 1960.

During World War II, Norcia tied for 3rd-5th at Munich 1942 (Europameisterschaft – European Individual Chess Championship, Wertungsturnier – Qualification Tournament, Gösta Danielsson won).

Norcia played for Italy in Chess Olympiads at Folkestone 1933, Munich 1936 (unofficial), Amsterdam 1954, Munich 1958 and Havana 1966. and represented Italy in friendly matches against Switzerland in 1958 and Hungary in 1960.
