= Vincenzo Nestler =

Italian chess player

Vincenzo Nestler (8 January 1912, in Agrigento – 14 July 1988, in Rome) was an Italian chess master.

He won twice Italian Chess Championship at Florence 1943 and Trieste 1954 (after a play-off), and was four times Sub-Champion (1937, 1953, 1956, 1959).

During World War II, Nestler took 6th at Munich 1942 (Europameisterschaft – European Individual Chess Championship, Wertungsturnier – Qualification Tournament, Gösta Danielsson won). After the war, he tied for 10-11th at Vienna 1951 (the 4th Schlechter Memorial, Moshe Czerniak won).

Nestler played twice for Italy in Chess Olympiads at Dubrovnik 1950 and Helsinki 1952, and represented Italy in friendly matches against Czechoslovakia in 1957 and Switzerland in 1958.
