= Mario Monticelli =

Italian chess grandmaster (1902–1995)

Personal information
- Born: 16 March 1902 Venice, Italy
- Died: 30 June 1995 (aged 93) Milan, Italy

Chess career
- Country: Italy
- Title: Honorary Grandmaster (1985); International Master (1950)

Mario Monticelli (16 March 1902, Venice – 30 June 1995, Milan) was an Italian chess player. He was awarded the International Master (IM) title in 1950 and the Grandmaster title honoris causa (GME) in 1985.

In 1922, he won in Rome (ITA-ch Univ). In 1925, he won in Bologna. In 1926, Monticelli tied for 1st with Ernst Grünfeld in Budapest. In 1929, he took 11th in Budapest (José Raúl Capablanca won). In 1929, he tied for 4-5th in Barcelona (Capablanca won). In 1930, he took 14th in San Remo (Alexander Alekhine won). In 1933, Monticelli won in Milan (Padulli Memorial). In 1934, he took 8th in Syracuse (Samuel Reshevsky won). In 1938, he tied for 1st with Erich Eliskases in Milan. Monticelli was Italian Champion in 1929, 1934, and 1939.

He is the eponym of the Monticelli Trap, a chess opening trap in the Bogo-Indian Defence.
