= Vincenzo Castaldi =

Italian chess player

Vincenzo Castaldi (15 May 1916, Marradi – 6 January 1970, Florence) was an Italian chess master.

He won the Italian Chess Championship seven times, (1936, 1937, 1947 (jointly), 1948, 1952 (jointly), 1953, and 1959), and was an Italian correspondence chess champion in 1956.

Castaldi represented Italy on first board in the 7th Chess Olympiad at Stockholm 1937 and 9th Chess Olympiad at Dubrovnik 1950.

He was awarded the International Master title in 1950.
