= Italian Chess Federation =

Governing body of chess in Italy

The Italian Chess Federation (Italian: Federazione Scacchistica Italiana; FSI) is the governing chess organization of Italy. It is a member of the Italian National Olympic Committee (CONI) and FIDE (the World Chess Federation). It was founded in Varese, Italy in 1920 and with its first president being Luigi Miliani.

== Administration ==
- President
- President Honoris
- Board of Directors (10 members)
- Presidential Commission (5 members)
- Board of Fiscal Directors (5 members)
- Commission of Justice and Discipline (14 members)
- Commission of Arbiters (5 members)
- Office staff (3 members)

Only the three-member office staff receives compensation.

== Clubs and individual members ==
The Italian Chess Federation is structured in terms of clubs which are members of the federation, and individuals who are members of the clubs. All individual memberships are made through the clubs and are on a calendar year basis with the individual being a member of only one club for any particular calendar year.

2011 Membership Statistics:

- 380 clubs
- 14,184 individual members
- 856 instructors (a part (subset) of the individual members)
- 366 arbiters (a part (subset) of the individual members)

Since memberships are on an annual basis as opposed to a rolling basis, complete 2012 statistics will be not available until December 31, 2012.

== See also ==
- International Correspondence Chess Federation (ICCF)
