= Dragoș-Nicolae Dumitrache =

Romanian chess player

Personal information
- Born: 7 December 1964 (age 61)

Chess career
- Country: Romania
- Title: International Master (1987)
- Peak rating: 2535 (July 1995)

Dragoș-Nicolae Dumitrache (born 7 December 1964) is a Romanian chess player, International Master (IM) (1987), Romanian Chess Championship winner (1991).

== Biography ==
In the 1990s, Dragoș-Nicolae Dumitrache was one of the top Romanian chess players. He won individual Romanian Chess Championship medals twice: gold (1991) and bronze (1994). He participated twice in the Chess Olympiads (1994, 1996), he also represented the national team at the European Team Chess Championship in 1989, where the Romanian chess players took 6th place.

Dragoș-Nicolae Dumitrache achieved a number of successes in international chess tournaments, including:

- 1st place in Münster (1993),
- 1st place in Budapest (1993, First Saturday FS03 IM tournament),
- shared 1st place in Eger (1993, together with, among others, Lajos Seres),
- shared 1st place in Timișoara (1994),
- shared 1st place in Paks (1997),
- shared 1st place in Sautron (2001),
- shared 2nd place in Bijeljina (2002, behind Vlatko Bogdanovski, together with Constantin Ionescu)
- 1st place in Bucharest (2003),
- shared 2nd place in Avoine (2003, after Andrei Istrățescu, together with, among others, Manuel Apicella),
- shared 2nd in Créon (2003, after Vladimir Epishin, together with, among others, Vladislav Nevednichy),
- shared 2nd in Eforie (2003, after Constantin Lupulescu),
- shared 2nd in La Fère (2004, after Vadim Malakhatko),
- 1st place in Guingamp (2008).

Dragoș-Nicolae Dumitrache achieved the highest rating in his career on July 1, 1995, with a score of 2535 points, he was then 2nd (behind Constantin Ionescu) among Romanian chess players.
