= Halic =

Halic may refer to:

- Haliç (disambiguation)
- Halič (disambiguation)

== People ==
- Ivan Halic (1910–1978), Romanian chess master
