= Stefan Erdélyi =

Hungarian-Romanian chess player

Ștefan (Stefan, Stepan) Erdélyi (17 November 1905, in Temesvár (now Timișoara) – 26 October 1968, in Reșița) was a Hungarian–Romanian chess master.

Born in Temesvár (then Austria-Hungary), he lived in Romania after World War I. He took 4th at Bucharest 1925 (Alexandru Tyroler won), shared 1st with János Balogh at Cernăuți (Chernivtsi) 1930 (Romanian Chess Championship, the title went to his co-winner). Erdélyi was thrice Romanian Champion (1931, 1934, and 1949).

He twice played for Romania in Chess Olympiads at Prague 1931 and Warsaw 1935.

Erdélyi tied for 5-6th at Budapest 1934 (Maróczy Jubilee, Erich Eliskases won), tied for 4-5th at Klosterneuburg 1934 (Karl Gilg and Hans Müller won), and tied for 15-16th at Trenčianske Teplice 1949 (Gideon Ståhlberg won).

He was awarded the International Master title in 1950.
