= Felix-Antonio Ilinca =

Spanish-Romanian chess grandmaster (born 2010)

Personal information
- Born: May 3, 2010 (age 16) Málaga, Spain

Chess career
- Country: Spain (until 2023); Romania (since 2023)
- Title: Grandmaster (2026)
- FIDE rating: 2491 (November 2026)
- Peak rating: 2507 (September 2026)

Felix-Antonio Ilinca is a Spanish-Romanian chess grandmaster.

== Chess career ==
In March 2024, he finished in 8th place at the Romanian Chess Championship.

In June 2024, he won the silver medal for U18 board 3 players at the European Youth Team Chess Championships.

In September 2024, he won the La Nucía International Chess Festival, scoring 6/8 and beating Adrian Galiana on tiebreak scores.

In June 2025, he won the Costa Azahar International Open with a score of 6.5/7. Later that month, he won the Nuevo Centro Open held in Valencia.

He was awarded the Grandmaster title in 2026 at the age of 16 and was coached by Ivan Sokolov throughout the journey. He achieved his norms at the:

- European Chess Club tournament in October 2024
- Budapest Spring Festival Group A tournament in March 2026
- Open International d'Aix en Provence in July 2026
- Turkiye Chess First League in August 2026
