= Negulescu =

Negulescu, sometimes Negulesco is a Romanian surname. Notable people with the surname include:

- Adrian Negulescu (born 1961), Romanian chess master
- Ion Negulescu (1887-1949), Romanian general and Minister of War
- Jean Negulesco, born Negulescu (1900–1993), Romanian-American film director and screenwriter
- Paul Negulescu, American–Romanian cell biologist
- Petre P. Negulescu (1870–1951), Romanian philosopher and politician
- Radu Negulescu (born 1941), Romanian table tennis player
