= Romanian Chess Championship =

National chess championship

The Romanian Chess Championship became a yearly event in 1946, and was held irregularly earlier. A series of national eliminating contests are played to select a 20-player field for the men's final. The women's final consists of 16 players.

== Men's winners ==
| Year | City | Men's winner |
|---|---|---|
| 1926 | Sibiu | Alexandru Tyroler |
| 1927 | Bucharest | Alexandru Tyroler |
| 1929 | Iași | Alexandru Tyroler |
| 1930 | Cernăuți | János Balogh |
| 1931 | Bucharest | Stefan Erdélyi |
| 1932 | Bucharest | Boris Kostić |
| 1933-4 | Bucharest | Stefan Erdélyi |
| 1935 | Bucharest | Heinrich Silbermann |
| 1936 | Bucharest | Ivan Halic |
| 1943 | Bucharest | Petre-Vlad Seimeanu |
| 1946 | Bucharest | Octav Troianescu |
| 1947 | Brașov | Traian Ichim |
| 1948 | Bucharest | Toma Popa |
| 1949 | Bucharest | Stefan Erdélyi |
| 1950 | Bucharest | Ion Bălănel |
| 1951 | Bucharest | Tudorel Flondor; Gheorghe-Gică Alexandrescu |
| 1952 | Bucharest | Victor Ciocâltea |
| 1953 | Bucharest | Ion Bălănel |
| 1954 | Bucharest | Octav Troianescu |
| 1955 | Bucharest | Ion Bălănel |
| 1956 | Bucharest | Octav Troianescu |
| 1957 | Bucharest | Octav Troianescu |
| 1958 | Bucharest | Ion Bălănel |
| 1959 | Bucharest | Victor Ciocâltea |
| 1960 | Bucharest | Florin Gheorghiu |
| 1961 | Bucharest | Victor Ciocâltea |
| 1962 | Bucharest | Florin Gheorghiu |
| 1963 | Bucharest | Theodor Ghițescu |
| 1964 | Bucharest | Florin Gheorghiu |
| 1965 | Bucharest | Florin Gheorghiu |
| 1966 | Bucharest | Florin Gheorghiu |
| 1967 | Bucharest | Florin Gheorghiu |
| 1968 | Bucharest | Octav Troianescu |
| 1969 | Bucharest | Victor Ciocâltea |
| 1970 | Bucharest | Victor Ciocâltea |
| 1971 | Bucharest | Victor Ciocâltea |
| 1972 | Bucharest | Carol Partoș |
| 1973 | Bucharest | Florin Gheorghiu |
| 1974 | Bucharest | Aurel Urzică |
| 1975 | Sinaia | Victor Ciocâltea |
| 1976 | Timișoara | Mihail-Viorel Ghindă |
| 1977 | Sibiu | Florin Gheorghiu |
| 1978 | Herculane | Mihail-Viorel Ghindă |
| 1979 | Bucharest | Victor Ciocâltea |
| 1980 | Bucharest | Mihai Șubă |
| 1981 | Bucharest | Mihai Șubă |
| 1982 | Bucharest | Ovidiu-Doru Foișor |
| 1983 | Bucharest | Mihail-Viorel Ghindă |
| 1985(1) | Bucharest | Sergiu-Henric Grünberg |
| 1985(2) | Timișoara | Mihai Șubă |
| 1986 | Sinaia | Adrian Negulescu |
| 1987 | Predeal | Florin Gheorghiu |
| 1988 | Predeal | Mihail Marin |
| 1989 | Eforie | Mihail-Viorel Ghindă |
| 1990 | Olimp | Ioan Biriescu |
| 1991 | | Dragoș-Nicolae Dumitrache |
| 1992 | | Andrei Istrățescu |
| 1993 | | Liviu-Dieter Nisipeanu |
| 1994 | | Mihail Marin |
| 1995 | | Romeo Sorin Milu |
| 1996 | Herculane | Liviu-Dieter Nisipeanu |
| 1997 | | Bela Badea |
| 1998 | Bucharest | Bela Badea |
| 1999 | Iași | Constantin Ionescu; Mihail Marin |
| 2000 | | Iulian Sofronie |
| 2001 | | Mircea Pârligras |
| 2002 | | Liviu-Dieter Nisipeanu |
| 2003 | Satu Mare | Mihai-Lucian Grünberg |
| 2004 | Brașov | Alin Berescu |
| 2005 | Băile Tușnad | Alin Berescu |
| 2006 | Predeal | Vlad-Cristian Jianu |
| 2007 | Amara | Constantin Lupulescu |
| 2008 | Cluj-Napoca | Vladislav Nevednichy |
| 2009 | Eforie Nord | Eduard-Andrei Valeanu |
| 2010 | Băile Olănești | Constantin Lupulescu |
| 2011 | Sarata Monteoru | Constantin Lupulescu |
| 2012 | Sarata Monteoru | Vladislav Nevednichy |
| 2013 | Olănești | Constantin Lupulescu |
| 2014 | Târgu Mureș | Vlad-Victor Bârnaure |
| 2015 | Călimănești-Căciulata | Constantin Lupulescu |
| 2016 | Bucharest | Mircea Pârligras |
| 2017 | Călimănești-Căciulata | Andrei Istrățescu |
| 2018 | Olănești | Tiberiu Georgescu |
| 2019 | Olănești | Lucian-Costin Miron |
| 2021 | Iași | Bogdan-Daniel Deac |
| 2022 | Eforie | Mircea Pârligras |
| 2023 | Sebeș | Kirill Shevchenko |
| 2024 | Eforie | Mircea Pârligras |
| 2025 | Craiova | David Gavrilescu |
| 2026 | Timișoara | Bogdan-Daniel Deac |

== Women's winners ==
| Year | City | Winner |
|---|---|---|
| 1936 | Bucharest | Rodica Manolescu (née Luția) |
| 1949 | Bucharest | Lidia Habermann-Giuroiu |
| 1950 | Brașov | Iolanda Szathmary |
| 1951 | Brașov | Maria Albuleț |
| 1952 | Sibiu | Elena Graboviețchi |
| 1953 | Satu Mare | Lidia Giuroiu |
| 1954 | Bucharest | Lidia Giuroiu |
| 1955 | Oradea | Maria Albuleț |
| 1956 | Cluj | Maria Albuleț |
| 1957 | Ploiești | Rodica Manolescu |
| 1958 | Bucharest | Lidia Giuroiu |
| 1959 | Bucharest | Margareta Teodorescu |
| 1960 | Timișoara | Alexandra Nicolau |
| 1961 | Bucharest | Alexandra Nicolau |
| 1962 | Brașov | Margareta Perevoznic |
| 1963 | Ploiești | Alexandra Nicolau |
| 1964 | Oradea | Alexandra Nicolau |
| 1965 | Herculane | Alexandra Nicolau |
| 1966 | Constanța | Elisabeta Polihroniade |
| 1967 | Arad | Gertrude Baumstark |
| 1968 | Oradea | Margareta Teodorescu |
| 1969 | Piatra Neamț | Margareta Teodorescu |
| 1970 | Ploiești | Elisabeta Polihroniade |
| 1971 | Brașov | Elisabeta Polihroniade |
| 1972 | Cluj | Elisabeta Polihroniade |
| 1973 | Brașov | Alexandra Nicolau |
| 1974 | Timișoara | Margareta Teodorescu |
| 1975 | Alexandria | Elisabeta Polihroniade |
| 1976 | Piatra Neamț | Elisabeta Polihroniade |
| 1977 | Sinaia | Elisabeta Polihroniade |
| 1978 | Mediaș | Daniela Nuțu |
| 1979 | Satu Mare | Daniela Nuțu |
| 1980 | Eforie | Daniela Nuțu |
| 1981 | Herculane | Gertrude Baumstark |
| 1982 | Mediaș | Eugenia Ghindă |
| 1983 | Herculane | Margareta Mureșan |
| 1984 | | Marina Pogorevici |
| 1985 | Herculane | Margareta Mureșan |
| 1986 | | Ligia Jicman |
| 1987 | | Margareta Mureșan |
| 1988 | | Gabriela Olărașu |
| 1989 | | Gabriela Olărașu; Cristina Adela Foișor |
| 1990 | | Mariana Ioniță |
| 1991 | | Elena Luminița Radu-Cosma |
| 1992 | | Elena Luminița Radu-Cosma |
| 1993 | | Gabriela Olărașu |
| 1994 | | Corina Peptan |
| 1995 | | Corina Peptan |
| 1996 | | Gabriela Olărașu |
| 1997 | | Corina Peptan |
| 1998 | | Cristina Adela Foișor; Ligia Jicman |
| 1999 | | Gabriela Olărașu |
| 2000 | | Corina Peptan |
| 2001 | | Iulia Ionică |
| 2002 | | Irina Ionescu Brandis |
| 2003 | | Gabriela Olărașu |
| 2004 | | Corina Peptan |
| 2005 | | Angela Dragomirescu |
| 2006 | | Ioana-Smaranda Pădurariu |
| 2007 | | Corina Peptan |
| 2008 | Napoca | Corina Peptan |
| 2009 | Eforie Nord | Corina Peptan |
| 2010 | Băile Olănești | Elena-Luminița Cosma |
| 2011 | Sarata Monteoru | Cristina Adela Foișor |
| 2012 | Sarata Monteoru | Cristina Adela Foișor |
| 2013 | Olănești | Cristina Adela Foișor |
| 2014 | Târgu Mureș | Corina Peptan |
| 2015 | Călimănești-Căciulata | Corina Peptan |
| 2016 | Bucharest | Elena-Luminița Cosma |
| 2017 | Călimănești-Căciulata | Corina Peptan |
| 2018 | Olănești | Irina Bulmaga |
| 2019 | Olănești | Corina Peptan |
| 2021 | Iași | Alessia-Mihaela Ciolacu |
| 2022 | Eforie | Alessia-Mihaela Ciolacu |
| 2023 | Sebeș | Miruna-Daria Lehaci |
| 2024 | Eforie | Miruna-Daria Lehaci |
| 2025 | Craiova | Elena-Luminița Cosma |
| 2026 | Timișoara | Corina Peptan |
