= Maurice Ashley =

American chess grandmaster (born 1966)

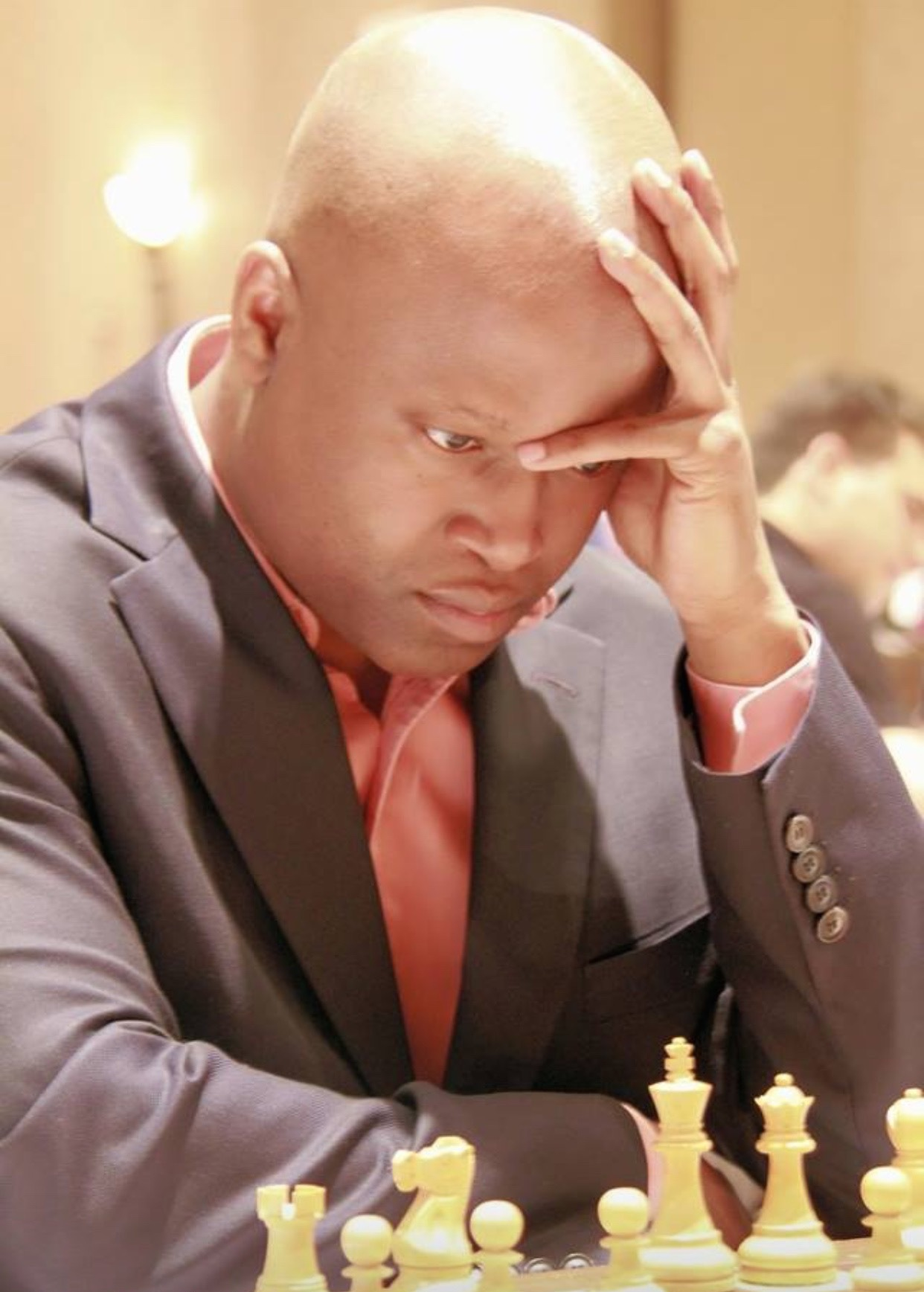
- Ashley in 2015
- Born: March 6, 1966 (age 60); Saint Andrew Parish, Jamaica
- Citizenship: United States
- Education: City College of New York
- Spouse: Michele Ashley-Johnson (m. 1993; div. 2014)
- Children: 2
- Chess career
- Country: United States
- Title: Grandmaster (2000)
- FIDE rating: 2440 (September 2026)
- Peak rating: 2504 (July 2001)
- Website: mauriceashley.com

Maurice Ashley (born March 6, 1966) is a Jamaican and American chess player, author, and commentator. In 1999, he earned the FIDE title of Grandmaster (GM).

Ashley is well known as a commentator for high-profile chess events. He also spent many years teaching chess. On April 13, 2016, Ashley was inducted into the US Chess Hall of Fame.

== Early life ==
Ashley was born in St. Andrew, Jamaica. He attended Wolmer's Boys School in Jamaica, and then moved to the United States when he was 12.

He went to Brooklyn Technical High School. Ashley graduated from City College of New York (CCNY) with a B.A. in Creative Writing. While at City College, he represented the school in intercollegiate team competition.

Ashley said he discovered chess in Jamaica, where his brother played chess with his friends. He got more serious about chess during high school, where he grew up in Brownsville, Brooklyn, and played in parks and clubs throughout New York City.

Ashley coached the Raging Rooks of Harlem, and the Dark Knights (also from Harlem), both of which won national championships under his guidance.

== Career ==
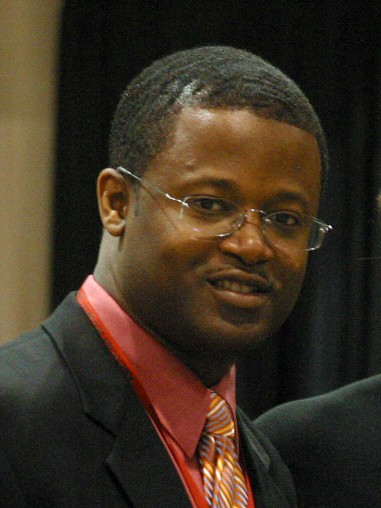
Ashley in 2005

In 1992, Ashley shared the United States Game/10 chess championship with Maxim Dlugy.

On March 14, 1999, Ashley beat Adrian Negulescu to complete the requirements for the Grandmaster title. This made him the first Black chess Grandmaster.

In September 1999, Ashley founded the Harlem Chess Center, which has attracted such celebrities as Larry Johnson and Wynton Marsalis.

Along with GM Susan Polgar, Ashley was named 2003 Grandmaster of the Year by the U.S. Chess Federation.

In 2003, Ashley wrote an essay The End of the Draw Offer?, which raised discussion about ways to avoid quick agreed draws in chess tournaments.

In 2005, he wrote the book Chess for Success, relating his experiences and the positive aspects of chess. He was the main organizer for the 2005 HB Global Chess Challenge, with the biggest cash prize in history for an open chess tournament.

In 2007, Ashley returned to his birth country of Jamaica and became the first GM to ever participate in a tournament there, the Frederick Cameron Open. After sweeping a field consisting of several of Jamaica's top players, Ashley was upset in the final round by Jamaican National Master Jomo Pitterson.

In 2008, Ashley was featured in an interview for the CNN documentary Black in America. He was shown during one scene in the film Brooklyn Castle mentoring a young chess player. He was mentioned in the chess movie Life of a King starring Cuba Gooding Jr.

Starting in the Fall of 2012, Ashley was a Director's Fellow at the MIT Media Lab and, between 2013 and 2015, Maurice was also a Fellow at Harvard University's Berkman Center for Internet & Society in a joint fellowship at both Harvard's Berkman Center and the Media Lab at MIT. Currently, Maurice is a Research affiliate at the Media Lab at MIT.

In 2013, Ashley announced he was planning the highest-stakes open chess tournament in history, Millionaire Chess Open. Its first edition took place October 9–13, 2014 in Las Vegas.

In 2015, Maurice announced a partnership with the Chess Club and Scholastic Center of Saint Louis and Ascension, Your Move Chess. This program supports after school chess in the Florissant-Ferguson School District alongside other schools in the Saint Louis area. Longer term, the goal is to expand the program on a national level.

In February 2016, a video of Ashley defeating a "trash-talking" amateur chess player in Washington Square Park went viral. The incident was referenced in an episode of Billions where Ashley portrayed the chess hustler.

On April 13, 2016, Ashley was inducted into the US Chess Hall of Fame along with Chess Grandmaster Gata Kamsky.

=== Commentator ===
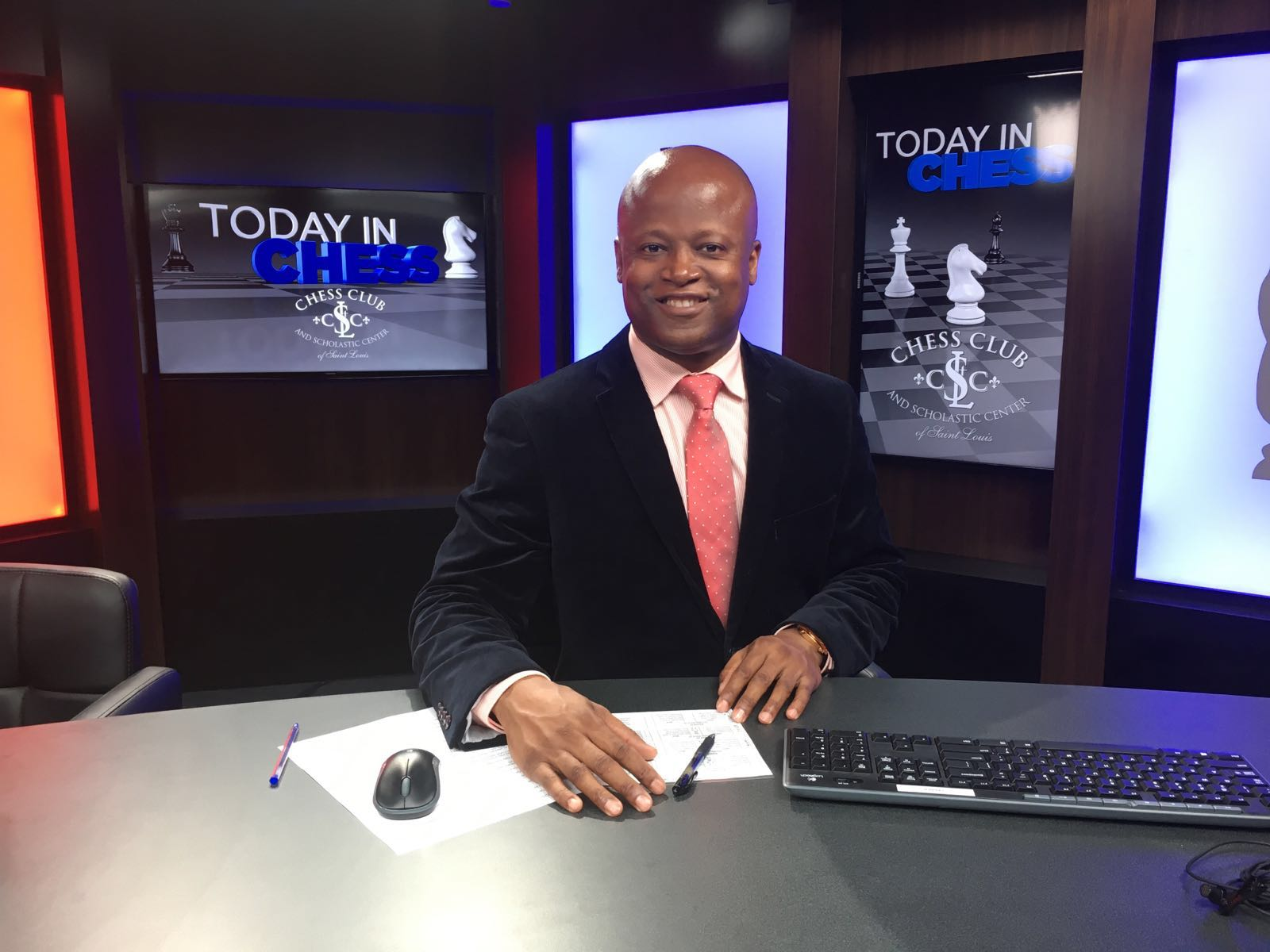
Ashley during Today in Chess program

Ashley has worked, and continues to work as a chess commentator covering many events, including those of the Grand Chess Tour. He was one of the commentators of the two matches between world champion Garry Kasparov and IBM's Deep Blue that took place in 1996 and 1997. He provided commentary for the Kasparov vs. Anand World Championship match in 1995. In 2003, Ashley hosted ESPN's broadcast of Kasparov's match against X3D Fritz. He has also served as a commentator for the 2013–19 Sinquefield Cups, several US Chess Championships, and many other chess events.

== Personal life ==
In 1993, Ashley married Michele Ashley-Johnson. Their daughter Nia was born the following year, and their son Jayden in 2002. The couple divorced in 2014.

Maurice's sister is former world boxing champion Alicia Ashley, and his brother is former world kickboxing champion Devon Ashley. He once stated "African[-]continent GMs do exist; but, according to the system of racial classification, I am the first Black GM in history... it matters, and doesn't matter, all at the same time."

== Works and publications ==
=== Monographs ===
- Ashley, Maurice. "The End of the Draw Offer?" The 65th Square.
- Ashley, Maurice. Chess for Success: Using an Old Game to Build New Strengths in Children and Teens. New York: Broadway Books, 2005. ISBN 978-0-767-91568-7 OCLC 56793604
- Ashley, Maurice, and Graham Burgess. The Most Valuable Skills in Chess. London: Gambit, 2009. ISBN 978-1-904-60087-9 OCLC 907184357
- Ashley, Maurice. "Ferguson and The Chess Game of Life." Jet. October 15, 2015.
- Ashley, Maurice. Move by move: life lessons on and off the chessboard. Chronicle Prism: San Francisco, 2024. ISBN 978-1-7972-2365-0.

=== Multimedia ===
- Ashley, Maurice. Maurice Ashley Teaches Chess For Beginning and Intermediate Players. Torrance, CA: Davidson & Associates, 1997. CD-ROM. ISBN 978-0-671-31579-5 OCLC 39350977
- "Maurice Ashley: Chess Grandmaster." Gates Jr. Henry Louis. America Beyond the Color Line: Ebony Towers. New York, N.Y.: Films Media Group, 2009. Starts at 2:19. OCLC 695008134
- Ashley, Maurice. Working backward to solve problems. TEDYouth 2012.
- Ashley, Maurice and Mobile MATCH, LLC. Learn Chess! with Maurice Ashley. Mobile phone app. 2012.
- Ashley, Maurice. Demetrious Johnson Charitable Foundation Lecture with GM Maurice Ashley: Chess for Football Players. Chess Club and Scholastic Center of Saint Louis. August 13, 2014.
- Ashley, Maurice. "Grandmaster Maurice Ashley plays trash talking guy in Washington Square Park." Outtake. The Tim Ferriss Experiment. February 16, 2016. The video went viral and has 1.4 million views on Maurice's YouTube channel.
- Ashley, Maurice. "Maurice Ashley 2016 US Chess Hall of Fame Induction Ceremony."
