= Miklós Bródy =

Hungarian-Romanian composer, conductor, chess player (1877–1949)

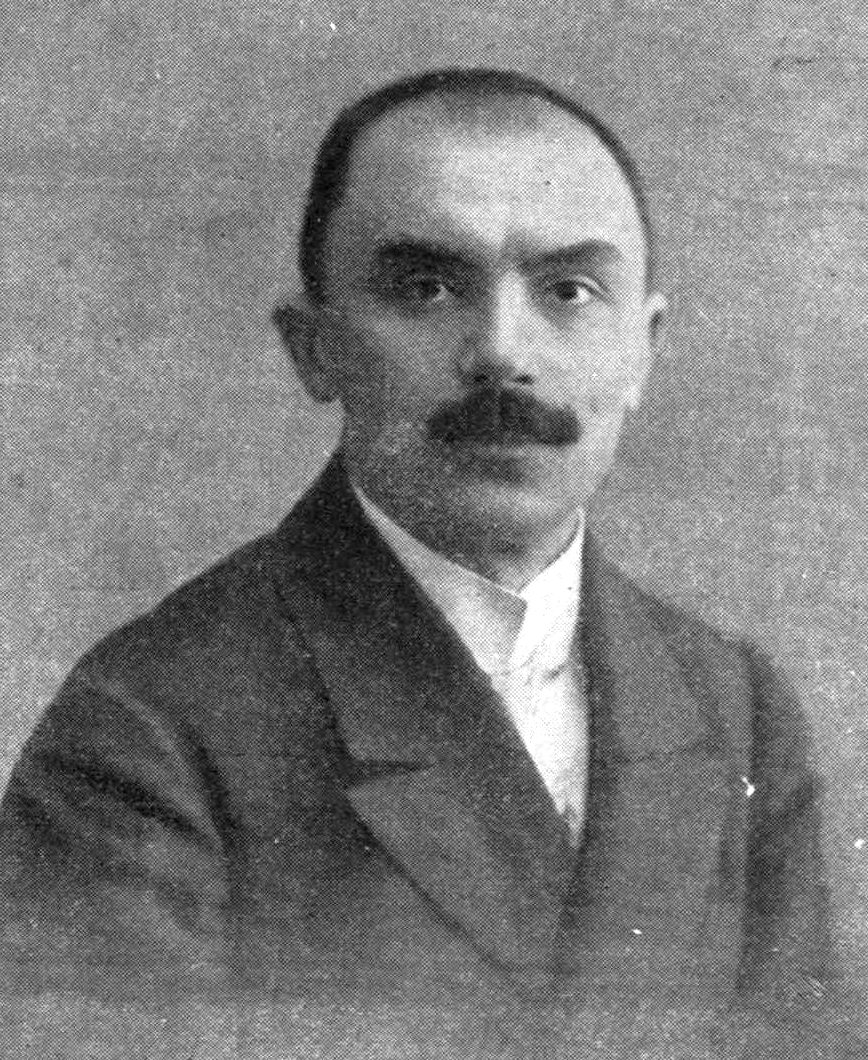
Bródy in 1923

Miklós Bródy (30 March 1877 – 17 December 1949) was a Hungarian–Romanian composer, conductor, and chess master.

Bródy was born in Nagykároly, Kingdom of Hungary, Austria-Hungary, now Carei, Romania; he died, aged 72, in Cluj-Napoca, Romania. His brother István (1882–1941) was a theatre director, and his son Tamás (1913–1990) was a composer and conductor.

== Music career ==
Bródy studied music in Cluj-Napoca and Budapest, and then became a conductor in Pécs, Graz, Bratislava and Cluj-Napoca. He was the conductor of the Romanian State Opera until his retirement in 1936. He translated and wrote operettas and set to music several poems by, among others, Endre Ady, Lajos Áprily, Goethe and Heine. His operettas and translations include A. B. C. (1903); A hollandi lány (1908, translation of Miss Hook of Holland by Paul Rubens); Férjhez megy a feleségem (My Wife is Getting Married, operetta, 1921); Thámár (operetta, premiered in Cluj-Napoca in 1922, and in Budapest under the title Az ígéret földje (The Promised Land) in 1929).

== Chess career ==
In 1897, he tied for 4–5th in Berlin (Ignatz von Popiel won). In 1897, he tied for 3rd–4th in Vienna (Georg Marco won). In 1899, he took 3rd in Budapest (Géza Maróczy won). In 1899, he tied for 2nd–3rd with Carl Schlechter, behind Géza Maróczy, in Vienna (Kolisch Memorial). He took 13th in the Paris 1900 chess tournament (Emanuel Lasker won).

In 1902, he took 8th in Hanover (13th DSB-Kongress, B tourn., Walter John won). In 1906, he took 3rd in Győr (1st HUN-ch, Zoltán von Balla won). In 1908, he tied for 6–7th in Düsseldorf (16th DSB-Kongress, Frank Marshall won). In 1909, he tied for 2nd–4th, behind Zsigmond Barász, in Budapest. In 1911, he tied for 3rd–5th in Budapest (HUN-ch, Balla and Barasz won). In 1913, he tied for 6–7th in Budapest (Rudolf Spielmann won).

After World War I, he became a Romanian citizen as a result of the post-war border changes in 1920. Brody took 6th at Budapest in 1921 (Savielly Tartakower and Szávay won). In 1927, he took 2nd, behind Alexandru Tyroler, in Bucharest (2nd ROM-ch).

He played for Romania in Chess Olympiads:

- In 1926, at second board in 2nd unofficial Chess Olympiad in Budapest;
- In 1928, at first board in 2nd Chess Olympiad in The Hague (+4 –8 =4);
- In 1935, at third board in 6th Chess Olympiad in Warsaw (+5 –3 =7).

He won team bronze medal at Budapest 1926.
