= Margareta Teodorescu =

Romanian chess player

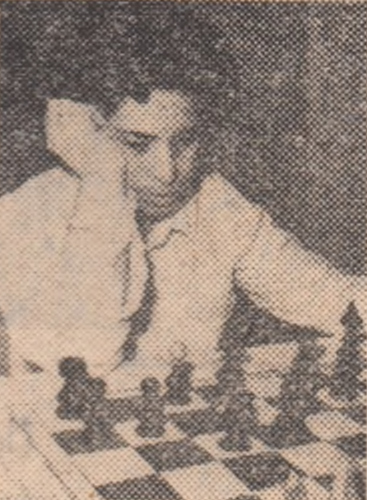

Personal information
- Born: 13 April 1932 Bucharest, Romania
- Died: 22 January 2013 (aged 80) Bucharest, Romania

Chess career
- Country: Romania
- Title: Woman Grandmaster (1985)
- Peak rating: 2180 (January 1975)

Margareta Teodorescu (13 April 1932 – 22 January 2013) was a Romanian chess player who was awarded the FIDE title of Woman Grandmaster (WGM) in 1985.

Born in Bucharest, she won the Romanian Women's Championship in 1959, 1968, 1969 and 1974. Teodorescu played for Romania in the Women's Chess Olympiads of 1957, 1963 and 1974, winning the team silver medals in both 1957 and 1974.

She came in 15th in the Women's Candidates Tournament (Sukhumi, 1964).

Her highest ranking in the FIDE Top Women list appears to be 35–37 in the July 1972 list (Elo 2165).
