= Victor Ciocâltea =

Romanian chess grandmaster (1932–1983)

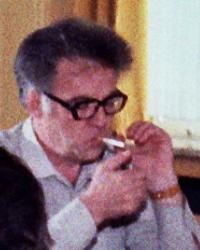
- Ciocâltea at Bochum, 1981

Personal information
- Born: January 16, 1932 Bucharest, Romania
- Died: September 10, 1983 (aged 51) Manresa, Spain

Chess career
- Country: Romania
- Title: Grandmaster (1978)
- Peak rating: 2480 (January 1976)

Victor Ciocâltea (January 16, 1932 – September 10, 1983) was a Romanian chess player. He was awarded the International Master title in 1957 and the International Grandmaster title in 1978. Among his notable games is the one at the 15th Chess Olympiad, held in Varna in 1962, where he defeated Bobby Fischer.

== Biography ==
Ciocâltea was Romanian Champion in 1952, 1959, 1961, 1969, 1970, 1971, 1975, and 1979. He played for Romania in eleven Chess Olympiads from 1956 to 1982.

He was a participant of four zonal FIDE tournaments (1954–1982). In 1954, he took 14th in Mariánské Lázně–Prague (Luděk Pachman won). In 1967, he took 15th in Halle (Lajos Portisch won). In 1972, he tied for 5–7th in Vrnjačka Banja. In 1982, he tied for 19–20th in Băile Herculane (Zoltán Ribli won).

In 1953, he tied for 11–12th in Bucharest (Alexander Tolush won). In 1954, he took 16th in Bucharest (Viktor Korchnoi won). In 1956, he took 3rd, behind Yuri Averbakh and Ratmir Kholmov, in Dresden. In 1956, he took 14th in Moscow (Alekhine Memorial; Mikhail Botvinnik won). In 1962, he took 9th in Havana (Capablanca Memorial; Miguel Najdorf won). In 1962, he tied for 1st–2nd in Sofia. In 1962, he tied for 3rd–4th in Belgrade (Svetozar Gligorić won).

In 1965, Ciocâltea took 16th in Havana (Capablanca Memorial; Vasily Smyslov won). In 1966, he took 2nd in Zinnowitz. In 1966/67, he tied for 1st–2nd with Dragoljub Čirić in Reggio Emilia. In 1968, he took 6th in Netanya (Bobby Fischer won). In 1968/69, he tied for 1st–4th in Reggio Emilia. In 1970, he took 13th in Caracas (Lubomir Kavalek won). In 1971, he tied for 3rd–4th in Málaga (Arturo Pomar won).

In 1973, he won in Tunis. In 1974, he tied for 1st with László Szabó in Dortmund. In 1975, he won in Bucharest. In 1979, he won in Satu Mare. In 1980, he won in Călimăneşti. In 1981, he won in Val Thorens. In 1981, he tied for 2nd–4th in Barcelona. In 1983, he tied for 6–8th in Netanya (Miguel Quinteros won). Ciocâltea died at the chess table, while playing a chess game at a Spanish tournament in September 1983.

== Victor Ciocâltea Memorial ==
Starting in 1984, the RATB Sports Association organizes the annual Victor Ciocâltea Memorial, the strongest chess competition in Romania.

== Notable games ==
- Victor Ciocaltea vs Robert James Fischer, Varna 1962, 15th Olympiad, Sicilian, Fianchetto, B50, 1–0
- Victor Ciocâltea vs László Szabó, Hamburg 1965, EU-ch T, Ruy Lopez, Closed, Breyer Defense, C94, 1–0
- Victor Ciocaltea vs Nona Gaprindashvili, Beverwijk 1969, Modern Defense, Standard Defense, B06, 1–0
- Miguel Quinteros vs Victor Ciocaltea, Málaga 1971, King's Indian, Fianchetto, E62, 0–1
