= Cristina Adela Foișor =

Romanian chess player (1967–2017)

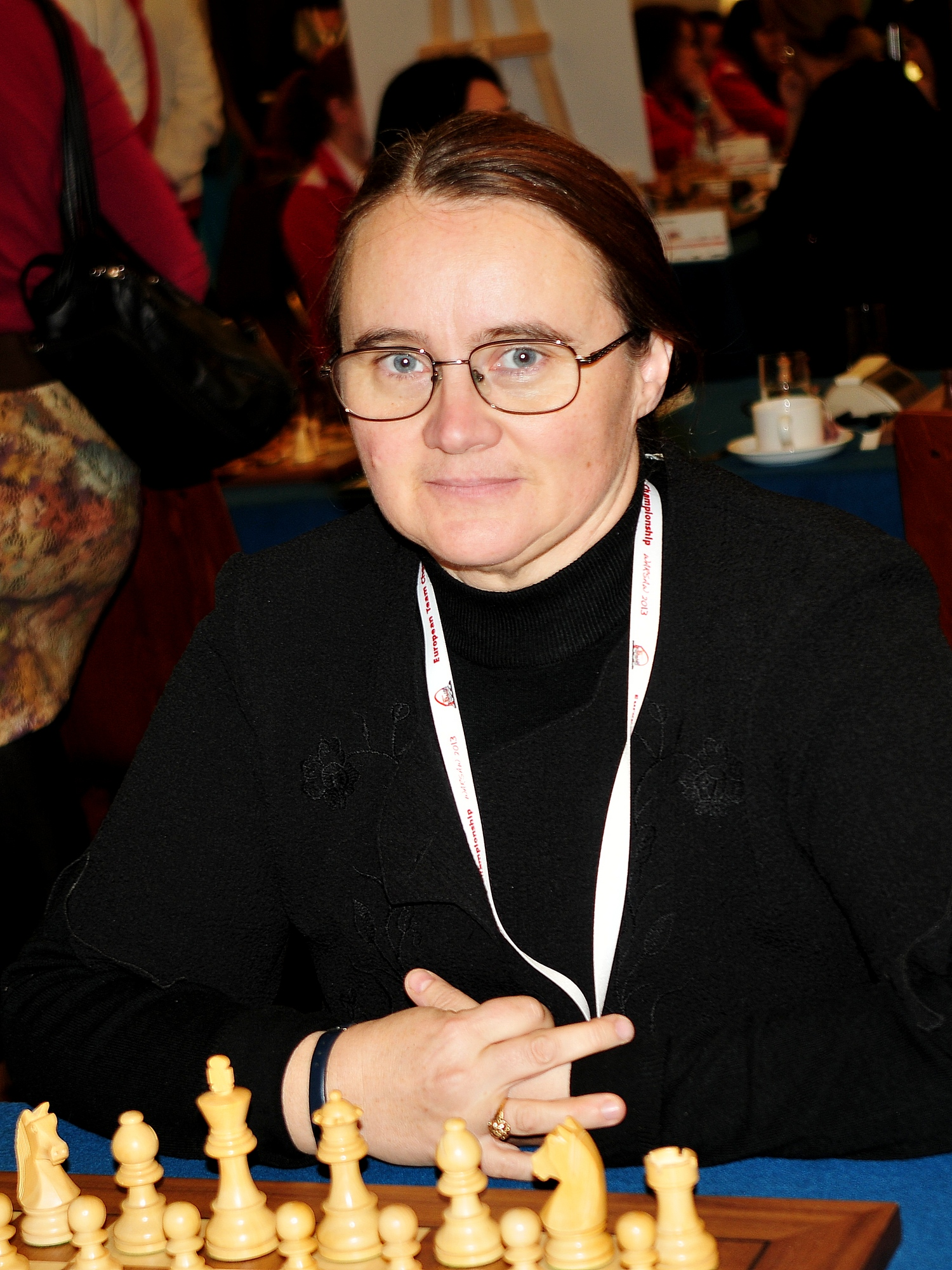
- Foișor at the 2013 European Chess Team Championships

Personal information
- Born: 7 June 1967 Petroșani, Romania
- Died: 22 January 2017 (aged 49) Timișoara, Romania
- Spouse: Ovidiu-Doru Foișor

Chess career
- Country: Romania
- Title: International Master (1997); Woman Grandmaster (1991)
- Peak rating: 2440 (January 2010)

Cristina Adela Foișor (née Bădulescu; 7 June 1967 – 22 January 2017) was a Romanian chess player. She was awarded by FIDE the titles of Woman Grandmaster (WGM) in 1991 and International Master (IM) in 1997.

== Biography and career ==
Foișor was born on 7 June 1967 in Petroșani and studied Mathematics at the University of Timișoara.

Foișor won the Women's Romanian Chess Championship five times: in 1989, 1998, 2011, 2012 and 2013. In 2007, she won the title of women's champion of the European Union and received the title of honorary citizen of the city of Petroșani.

In 1994, Foișor played in the Women's Candidates Tournament in Tilburg, for which she qualified through the 1993 Interzonal Tournament in Jakarta. She competed in the Women's World Chess Championship held with the knock-out format in 2001, 2006, 2010 and 2012.

In 2006, Foișor shared first place with Anna Zatonskih and Elena-Luminița Cosma in the WGM tournament of the Marseille Chess Festival.

In team events, she represented Romania at fourteen Women's Chess Olympiads (1988, 1990, 1992, 1994, 1996, 1998, 2000, 2002, 2004, 2006, 2010, 2012, 2014 and 2016), 2013 Women's World Team Chess Championship, eight Women's European Team Chess Championships (1992, 1997, 2001, 2003, 2005, 2011, 2013 and 2015), and three Women's Chess Balkaniads (1985, 1990 and 1992). In this latter competition, Foișor won two gold medals (team and individual playing board 2) in 1985. In the European Club Cup for Women, playing for team AEM Luxten Timișoara, she won a team gold medal in 1998 and two team silver, in 1999 and 2011.

Foișor died at the Timișoara County Hospital on 22 January 2017. She had been scheduled to play at the Women's World Championship in Iran in February 2017.

=== Personal life ===
She was married to 1982 Romania chess champion International Master Ovidiu-Doru Foișor and their daughters are also titled chess players: Sabina-Francesca Foișor is a Woman Grandmaster and Mihaela-Veronica Foișor is a Woman International Master.
