= Heinrich Silbermann =

Romanian chess player

Personal information
- Born: unknown
- Died: unknown

Chess career
- Country: Romania

Heinrich Silbermann (unknown — unknown), was a Romanian chess player, Romanian Chess Championship winner (1935).

== Biography ==
In the mid-1930s Heinrich Silbermann was one of the strongest Romanian chess players. In 1935, in Bucharest he won Romanian Chess Championship.

Heinrich Silbermann played for Romania in the Chess Olympiad:

- In 1935, at first board in the 6th Chess Olympiad in Warsaw (+0, =2, -6).
