= Alin Berescu =

Romanian chess grandmaster (born 1980)

Personal information
- Born: Alin Mile Berescu; April 14, 1980 (age 46) Timișoara, Romania

Chess career
- Country: Romania
- Title: Grandmaster (2007)
- FIDE rating: 2429 (July 2026)
- Peak rating: 2516 (May 2012)

Alin Mile Berescu (born April 14, 1980, Timișoara, Romania) is a Romanian chess grandmaster and FIDE trainer. He was the Vice-President of the Romanian Chess Federation. Berescu won the International Master title in 2001 and grandmaster title in 2007. He was the winner of the Romanian Chess Championship in 2004 and 2005.

== Notable tournaments ==
| Tournament Name | Year | ELO | Points |
|---|---|---|---|
| Romanian Teams 1st League | 2021 | 2443 | 4.5 |
| 1st Grand Europe Open(Golden Sands BUL) | 2012 | 2516 | 4.5 |
| Vojvodina-chT ( Sremska Mitrovica) | 2006 | 2491 | 6.5 |
| ROM-ch(Baile Tusnad) | 2005 | 2420 | 7.5 |
| ROM-ch(Brasov) | 2004 | 2424 | 7.0 |
| Revelionul Mileniului rapid (Revelionul) | 2000 | 2465 | 5.0 |
| ROM-ch sf (Tusnad) | 2000 | 2480 | 7.0 |
| Centrocoop Sept op | 1999 | 2392 | 6.5 |
| Bucharest TIT (Bucharest) | 1999 | 2392 | 9.0 |
| ROM-chT (Sovata) | 1998 | 2320 | 4.5 |
| Wch U18 (Oropesa del Mar) | 1998 | 2370 | 7.0 |
| HUN-ROM U18 (Kiskunhalas) | 1995 | 2235 | 4.0 |
| Timisoara (Timisoara) | 1994 | 2255 | 5.5 |
| Wch U14 (Bratislava) | 1993 | NA | 7.0 |
| EU-ch U12 (Rimavska Sobota) | 1992 | NA | 5.5 |
| Wch U12 (Mamaia) | 1991 | NA | 7.5 |
| Wch U10 (Fond du Lac) | 1990 | 2200 | 1.5 |
