= Käty van der Mije-Nicolau =

Dutch-Romanian chess player

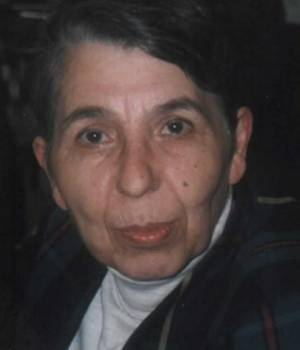

Personal information
- Born: Alexandra Ekatarina Nicolau; 22 July 1940 Bucharest, Romania
- Died: 14 October 2013 (aged 73) Haarlem, Netherlands

Chess career
- Country: Romania (until 1974); Netherlands (after 1974)
- Title: Woman Grandmaster (1976)
- Peak rating: 2340 (July 1971)

Käty van der Mije-Nicolau (22 July 1940 – 14 October 2013), born Alexandra Ekatarina Nicolau, was a Dutch-Romanian chess player and Woman Grandmaster. She was the Romanian national champion six times before moving to the Netherlands in 1974. In the Netherlands, she was the national champion in 1974 and the years 1976 to 1979. Her best worldwide rank among women was fifth.

== Early life ==
Nicolau was born in Bucharest as the daughter of Ștefan S. Nicolau, a Romanian virology expert. She would herself study the Chinese language. She was introduced to chess at the age of six by one of her brothers, who taught her how to play.

== Chess career ==
Nicolau won the Romanian Women's Chess Championship six times: 1960, 1961, 1963, 1964, 1965 and 1973. For Romania, Nicolau also participated in the Chess Olympiad. At the 17th Chess Olympiad (1966) and 20th Chess Olympiad (1972), she was a member of the women's team which won the silver medal. As an individual, she won silver at the Olympiads in 1963 and 1966 at the first board, and won bronze in 1972 at the second board.

In 1974 she started playing for the Netherlands, after staying in the country following her participation in the Hoogovenstoernooi the same year. She was awarded a permanent residency and later Dutch nationality when she married Kees van der Mije. Nicolau had earlier resided for several months in the Netherlands after a tournament; she lacked permission from the Romanian government to do so. In 1969 she wished to study at Leiden University; however, while completing formalities in Romania, she was not allowed to return to the Netherlands and was banned from playing international chess tournaments. Her ban was removed after pressure from FIDE president Max Euwe. However, she was forced to promise members of the Securitate secret police that she would return after playing international tournaments until 1974. The Hoogovenstournooi was the first tournament for which Nicolau did not have to promise to return, and she immediately chose to remain in the Netherlands.

She won the Dutch Women's Chess Championship in 1974 and again from 1976 to 1979. She also competed at the Olympiads for the Netherlands, first on the women's team at the 22nd Chess Olympiad (1976), winning the bronze medal. In 1980 she quit playing professional chess. Her final appearance at the Olympiad was at the 28th Chess Olympiad (1988).

At her peak, Van der Mije-Nicolau was the fifth-ranked woman player in the world, but was never able to show great results at the Women's World Chess Championship due to her nerves. After her third-place finish at the Interzonal tournament in Roosendaal in 1976, she was awarded the title of Woman Grandmaster.

== Personal life ==
Van der Mije has said she was not fanatical enough to only spend her time on chess, as she also liked to read detective stories and visit museums. After her retirement, she was a weekly member of the Het Spaarne chess club in Haarlem, where she was club champion in 2007. She died from cardiac arrest on 14 October 2013 at the age of 73.
