= Gabriela Olărașu =

Romanian chess player

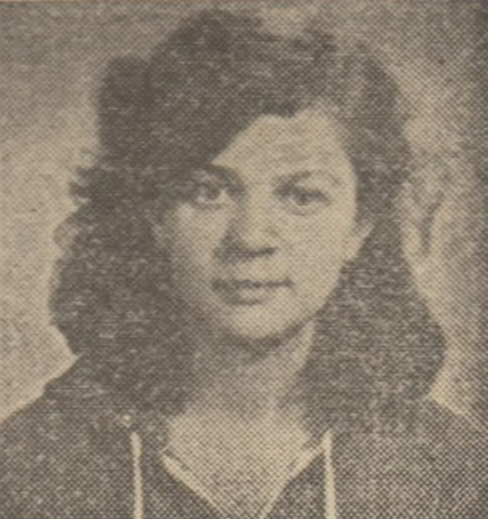

Personal information
- Born: 7 November 1964 (age 61) Iași, Socialist Republic of Romania

Chess career
- Country: Romania
- Title: Woman Grandmaster (1997)
- Peak rating: 2373 (July 2000)

Gabriela Olărașu (née Stanciu, also Stanciu-Olărașu; born 7 November 1964) is a Romanian chess player who holds the title of Woman Grandmaster (WGM, 1997). She is six times Romanian Women Chess Champion (1988, 1989, 1993, 1996, 1999, 2003).

== Biography ==
She was born on 7 November 1964, in Iași. She graduated the "Costache Negruzzi" high school in 1983.

In 1984, in Katowice she won silver medal in European Junior Chess Championship for under age 20. Olărașu has participated in many Romanian women's chess championships where she won 6 gold (1988, 1989, 1993, 1996, 1999, 2003), 4 silver (1984, 1985, 1995, 2004) and 4 bronzes (1987, 1994, 2001, 2002) medals. Gabriela Olărașu is the winner of many international women chess tournaments, including the ones in Bucharest (1997), Belgrade (2005) and Sofia (2006).

Gabriela Olărașu played for Romania in the Women's Chess Olympiads:

- In 1984, at first reserve board in the 26th Chess Olympiad (women) in Thessaloniki (+0, =2, −0) and won the team bronze medal,
- In 1986, at first reserve board in the 27th Chess Olympiad (women) in Dubai (+5, =4, −0) and won the team bronze medal and individual gold medal,
- In 1988, at second board in the 28th Chess Olympiad (women) in Thessaloniki (+5, =2, −5),
- In 1990, at third board in the 29th Chess Olympiad (women) in Novi Sad (+6, =1, −5),
- In 1996, at first reserve board in the 32nd Chess Olympiad (women) in Yerevan (+2, =3, −2),
- In 1998, at first reserve board in the 33rd Chess Olympiad (women) in Elista (+6, =0, −3),
- In 2002, at third board in the 35th Chess Olympiad (women) in Bled (+2, =6, −2),
- In 2004, at third board in the 36th Chess Olympiad (women) in Calvià (+6, =1, −3).

Gabriela Olărașu played for Romania in the European Team Chess Championships:

- In 2005, at third board in the 6th European Team Chess Championship (women) in Gothenburg (+2, =5, −1).

Olărașu was awarded the FIDE Woman International Master (WIM) title in 1985 and the Woman Grandmaster (WGM) title in 1997.

On 17 June 2012, she suffered a heart attack followed by a cardiac arrest. She spent three weeks in a coma, after which she partially recovered. A month after waking up from the coma, she was released from the hospital, only to come back. The doctors found out she had a cancerous blood disease.

As of 2013, she still did not recover from her condition.
