= Elisabeta Polihroniade =

Romanian chess player

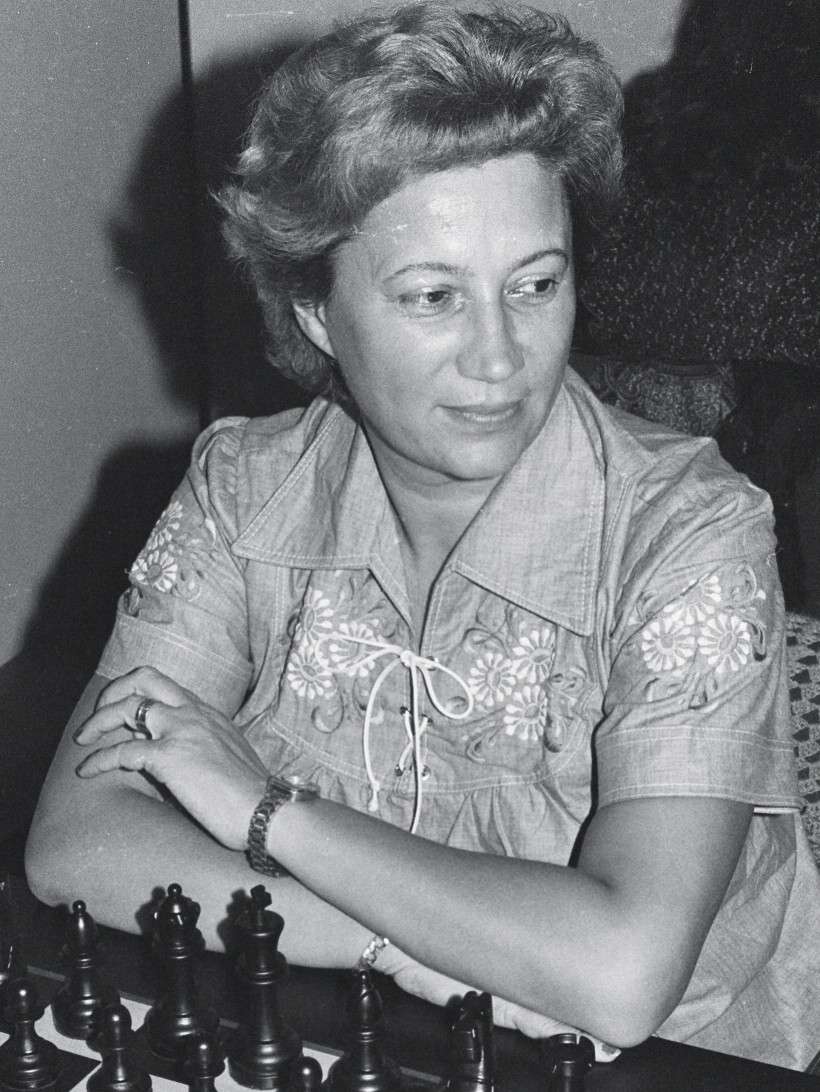
- Elisabeta Polihroniade, 1979 in Rio de Janeiro

Personal information
- Born: 24 April 1935 Bucharest, Romania
- Died: 23 January 2016 (aged 80)

Chess career
- Country: Romania
- Title: Woman Grandmaster (1982)
- Peak rating: 2391 (February 1992)

Elisabeta Polihroniade (Romanian pronunciation: [elisaˈbeta polihroniˈade]; née Ionescu; 24 April 1935 – 23 January 2016) was a Romanian chess player holding the title of Woman Grandmaster (WGM), and an International Arbiter (1986). She was born in Bucharest.

She won the Romanian Women's Championship in 1966, 1970, 1971, 1972, 1975, 1976 and 1977. Polihroniade played for Romania in the Women's Chess Olympiads of 1966, 1969, 1972, 1974, 1978, 1980, 1982, 1984, 1986 and 1988.

Her peak rating was 2391, achieved in February 1992.

Polihroniade was a journalist and broadcaster, with her own daily radio programme on contemporary culture. She was the editor of Gambit, the Romanian chess magazine, and wrote many books.

== Studies ==
- Faculty of Philosophy, University of Bucharest (1960)

== Professional activity ==
- Producer of Sahiste radio and TV programs for TVR (1960-1997)
- Director of the "Epoli" publishing house (since 1990)
- Editor and director of the Romanian Chess Magazine "Gambit" (since 1993)
- Vice-President of the Romanian Chess Federation (1995-2001)
- Co-President of the International Chess School "Karpov - Polihroniade" (since 1995)
- President of "Gambit - Elisabeta Polihroniade" Foundation (since 1996)
- Vice-President of the International Union of Chess in Schools (since 2003)
- Co-President of ISCU Romania (since 2004)

== Individual gold medals ==
- European Championships, Vrnjacka Banja, Yugoslavia, 1st/ 3rd place (1971)

== Team medals ==
- Second place Oberhausen, Germany (1966)
- Second place Skopje, Yugoslavia (1972)
- First and Second Place Medelin, Colombia (1974)
- Second Place Lucerne, Switzerland (1982)
- Third Place Thessaloniki, Greece (1984)
- Third Place Dubai, United Arab Emirates (1986)

== Published books ==
- Elisabeta Polihroniade - Olympic Games in black and white, Ed. Sport-turism, 1976
- Elisabeta Polihroniade, Tiberiu Rădulescu - First steps in chess, Ed. Sport-Turism, 1982
- Elisabeta Polihroniade - Chess for All, Ed. Sport-Turism, 1984
- Elisabeta Polihroniade - 64 beauty prizes in chess, Ed. Sport-Turism, 1990

== Notable chess games ==
- Valentina Kozlovskaya vs Elisabeta Polihroniade, 3rd olw final 1966, Modern Defense (A42), 0-1
- Elisabeta Polihroniade vs Leonid Shamkovich, Cup World (open) 1989, Sicilian Defense (B43), 1-0
