= Traian Ichim =

Romanian chess player

Personal information
- Born: 1905 Iași, Romania
- Died: 1974 (aged 68–69)

Chess career
- Country: Romania

Traian Ichim (1905 — 1974), was a Romanian chess player, Romanian Chess Championship winner (1947).

== Biography ==
From the mid-1930s to the end of the 1940s Traian Ichim was one of the strongest Romanian chess players. In 1947, in Brașov he won Romanian Chess Championship.

Traian Ichim played for Romania in the Chess Olympiad:

- In 1935, at second board in the 6th Chess Olympiad in Warsaw (+2, =8, -9).

Traian Ichim played for Romania in the unofficial Chess Olympiad:

- In 1936, at second board in the 3rd unofficial Chess Olympiad in Munich (+3, =4, -12).

Traian Ichim played for Romania in the Men's Chess Balkaniad:

- In 1947, at first board in the 2nd Men's Chess Balkaniad (+1, =0, -2).
