= Ion Bălănel =

Romanian chess player (born 1926)

Personal information
- Born: 7 June 1926 Bucharest, Romania

Chess career
- Country: Romania
- Title: International Master (1954)

Ion Bălănel (born 7 June 1926) is a Romanian chess player, an International Master (IM) (1954), and a four-times Romanian Chess Championship winner (1950, 1953, 1955, 1958).

== Biography ==
In the 1950s Ion Bălănel was one of the strongest Romanian chess players. In Romanian Chess Championships, he won six medals: four gold (1950, 1953, 1955, 1958) and two bronze (1951, 1954). Ion Bălănel was two-times participant in World Chess Championship Zonal tournaments: in 1951 in Mariánské Lázně he ranked 13th place, but in 1954 in Prague he ranked 8th place. Ion Bălănel won International Chess tournament in Międzyzdroje (1952, shared 1st-2nd place with Zdravko Milev) and Ploiești (1957). In 1955, in Bucharest he played in the national team match with France and on the second board defeating Chantal Chaudé de Silans with 2:0. In 1954, he was awarded the FIDE International Master (IM) title.

Ion Bălănel played for Romania in the Chess Olympiad:

- In 1956, at first board in the 12th Chess Olympiad in Moscow (+2, =5, -5).

Ion Bălănel played for Romania in the European Team Chess Championship preliminaries:

- In 1957, at second board in the 1st European Team Chess Championship preliminaries (+2, =0, -2).

In 1958 he was virtually excommunicated from his club Dinamo and put in a lunatic asylum by the communist regime.
