= 6th Chess Olympiad =

1935 chess tournament in Warsaw, Poland

The winning American team is awarded the Hamilton-Russell Cup.

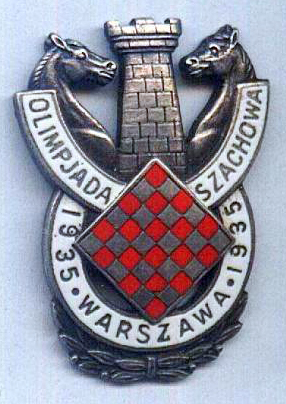
Award from the 1935 Chess Olympiad

The 6th Chess Olympiad (Polish: 6. Olimpiada szachowa), organized by FIDE and comprising a team tournament, took place between August 16 and August 31, 1935, in Warsaw, Poland. The famous retired Polish master Dawid Przepiórka took the major responsibility as a chairman of Organizing Committee.

The 1935 Women's World Chess Championship also took place during the Olympiad.

== Results ==
=== Team standings ===
#	Country	Players	Points
1	United States	Fine, Marshall, Kupchik, Dake, Horowitz	54
2	Sweden	Ståhlberg, Stoltz, Lundin, Danielsson, Larsson	52½
3	Poland	Tartakower, Frydman, Najdorf, Friedman, Makarczyk	52
4	Hungary	Steiner L., Lilienthal, Havasi, Szabó, Réthy	51
5	Czechoslovakia	Flohr, Opočenský, Rejfíř, Treybal K., Pelikán	49
6	Yugoslavia	Vidmar, Pirc, Kostić, Trifunović, König	45½
7	Austria	Grünfeld, Spielmann, Eliskases, Müller, Podhorzer	43½
8	Argentina	Grau, Bolbochán Jac., Pleci, Maderna	42
9	Latvia	Petrovs, Apšenieks, Feigins, Hasenfuss, Krūmiņš	41
10	France	Alekhine, Betbeder, Muffang, Kahn, Raizman	38
11	Estonia	Keres, Friedemann, Laurine, Raud, Kibbermann	37½
12	England	Winter, Thomas, Alexander, Atkins, Golombek	37
13	Finland	Böök, Rasmusson, Solin, Krogius, Salo	35
14	Lithuania	Mikėnas, Machtas, Vistaneckis, Vaitonis, Luckis	34
15	Palestine	Foerder, Enoch, Dobkin, Winz, Czerniak	32
16	Denmark	Andersen, Nielsen B., Enevoldsen, Nielsen J., Sørensen	31½
17	Romania	Silbermann, Ichim, Bródy, Erdélyi, Popa	27½
18	Italy	Sacconi, Monticelli, Rosselli del Turco, Romi, Napolitano	24
19	Switzerland	Naegeli, Grob, Michel, Stähelin, Gygli	21
20	Irish Free State	Reilly, Creevey, O'Hanlon, Cranston, De Burca	12

=== Team results ===
Place	Country	1	2	3	4	5	6	7	8	9	10	11	12	13	14	15	16	17	18	19	20	+	−	=	Points
1	United States	-	1½	2½	1	3	2½	2½	2½	2½	3½	3½	2½	3½	2½	3½	3	4	3½	3½	3	17	2	0	54
2	Sweden	2½	-	1½	2	2	1½	2	3½	2½	3½	3	2½	2½	3	3	3	4	4	3	3½	14	2	3	52½
3	Poland	1½	2½	-	2½	2	1½	2	2	3	2½	3½	3½	3	2½	3	3	2	4	4	4	13	2	4	52
4	Hungary	3	2	1½	-	2	3	2	1½	3	2½	3	2½	2½	2½	3½	3½	3	3½	3½	3	14	2	3	51
5	Czechoslovakia	1	2	2	2	-	2	2	2½	2	3	3	2	4	3	2	3½	2½	3	3½	4	10	1	8	49
6	Yugoslavia	1½	2½	2½	1	2	-	1	2	2	3	3	2½	2½	3	3	2½	3	3	1½	4	12	4	3	45½
7	Austria	1½	2	2	2	2	3	-	2	1½	2	2	2½	1½	2	3	2½	1½	3	3½	4	7	4	8	43½
8	Argentina	1½	½	2	2½	1½	2	2	-	1	2½	2½	2	1½	2½	2½	3	2½	3½	3½	3	10	5	4	42
9	Latvia	1½	1½	1	1	2	2	2½	3	-	2	1½	1	2½	1½	3	3	3	3½	2½	3	9	7	3	41
10	France	½	½	1½	1½	1	1	2	1½	2	-	2½	2½	1½	2	3	3	2	2	4	4	6	8	5	38
11	Estonia	½	1	½	1	1	1	2	1½	2½	1½	-	1½	1½	2	2½	3½	3½	4	3	3½	7	10	2	37½
12	England	1½	1½	½	1½	2	1½	1½	2	3	1½	2½	-	3	1½	2½	1	1½	3	2	3½	6	10	3	37
13	Finland	½	1½	1	1½	0	1½	2½	2½	1½	2½	2½	1	-	2	2	2	4	1	3½	2	6	9	4	35
14	Lithuania	1½	1	1½	1½	1	1	2	1½	2½	2	2	2½	2	-	1½	2	1½	1	3	3	4	10	5	34
15	Palestine	½	1	1	½	2	1	1	1½	1	1	1½	1½	2	2½	-	2	2½	2	3½	4	4	11	4	32
16	Denmark	1	1	1	½	½	1½	1½	1	1	1	½	3	2	2	2	-	3½	3	2	3½	4	11	4	31½
17	Romania	0	0	2	1	1½	1	2½	1½	1	2	½	2½	0	2½	1½	½	-	2	3	2½	5	11	3	27½
18	Italy	½	0	0	½	1	1	1	½	½	2	0	1	3	3	2	1	2	-	1½	3½	3	13	3	24
19	Switzerland	½	1	0	½	½	2½	½	½	1½	0	1	2	½	1	½	2	1	2½	-	3	3	14	2	21
20	Irish Free State	1	½	0	1	0	0	0	1	1	0	½	½	2	1	0	½	1½	½	1	-	0	1	18	12

=== Individual medals ===
The prizes for best individual results went to:

- Board 1: (Czechoslovakia) Salo Flohr 13 / 17 = 76.5%
- Board 2: (Hungary) Andor Lilienthal 15 / 19 = 78.9%
- Board 3: (Austria) Erich Eliskases 15 / 19 = 78.9%
- Board 4: (United States) Arthur Dake 15½ / 18 = 86.1%
- Reserve: (United States) Al Horowitz 12 / 15 = 80.0%
