= Ovidiu-Doru Foișor =

Romanian chess player (born 1959)

Personal information
- Born: 6 April 1959 (age 67)
- Spouse: Cristina Adela Bădulescu

Chess career
- Country: Romania
- Title: International Master (1982)
- Peak rating: 2495 (January 1987)

Ovidiu-Doru Foișor (born 6 April 1959) is a Romanian chess player, International Master (IM) (1982), Romanian Chess Championship winner (1982).

== Biography ==
In the 1980s, Foișor was one of the leading Romanian chess players. In 1978, he ranked 4th in the European Junior Chess Championship in Groningen. Foișor won gold (1982), silver (1985) and bronze (1987) medals in the Romanian Chess Championships.

Foișor is laureate of many international chess tournaments, including winning or sharing 1st place in tournaments in Timișoara (1987), Olot, 1992), Grenoble (2003), Cannes (2007), Liège (2008), Lausanne (2008).

Foișor represented the Romanian team in major team chess tournaments:

- Chess Olympiads participated 2 times (1982, 1988);
- Men's Chess Balkaniads participated 6 times (1979, 1982–1983, 1986–1988, 1992). He has won bronze medals in the team evaluation all times, and in the individual one - gold (1979) and 2 silver (1986, 1988) medals.

In 1982, he was awarded the FIDE International Master (IM) title.

From 2000 to 2006, Foișor was the captain of the Romanian chess team at the Chess Olympiads, and in 2001 and 2005 he performed the same functions at the European Team Chess Championships.

== Personal life ==
Married to Romanian chess grandmaster Cristina Adela Foișor (1967–2017). Their daughters Sabina-Francesca Foisor (born 1989) and Mihaela-Veronica (born 1994) are also chess players.
