= Edgars Krūmiņš =

Latvian chess player

Personal information
- Born: 21 August 1909 Riga, Latvia
- Died: unknown

Chess career
- Country: Latvia

Edgars Roberts Krūmiņš (21 August 1909 – unknown) was a Latvian chess player.

== Biography ==
In 1926, Edgars Krūmiņš graduated from the Second City Gymnasium in Riga. In 1929, he entered the Faculty of Mathematics in University of Latvia, which he graduated in 1935. In the academic year 1936/37, Edgars Krūmiņš was a mathematics teacher at a secondary school in the Latvian city Cesvaine.

In the early 1930s, Edgars Krūmiņš became one of the strongest chess players in Latvia. His biggest success was the third place in Latvian Chess Championship in 1934 (after the winners Fricis Apšenieks and Vladimirs Petrovs). For this success Krumins was awarded the title of Latvian National Chess Master. He was the fifth chess player after Hermanis Matisons, Fricis Apšenieks, Vladimirs Petrovs and Movsas Feigins, who received this honorary title.

Edgars Krūmiņš played for Latvia in the Chess Olympiad:

- In 1935, at fourth board in the 6th Chess Olympiad in Warsaw (+3, =5, -2).

Edgars Krūmiņš played for Latvia in the unofficial Chess Olympiad:

- In 1936, at fourth board in the 3rd unofficial Chess Olympiad in Munich (+5, =6, -5).

Many chess publications (including the Internet portals Olimpbase.org, Chessgames.com) incorrectly indicate that it was not Edgar who participated in Chess Olympiads, but his brother Alfrēds Krūmiņš (1911-1980), who was also a chess player.

In the late 1930s, Edgars Krūmiņš fell ill and moved away from an active chess life. The last known tournament with his participation was the 1940 Riga Chess Championship, in which he shared 11th - 12th place. There is no reliable information about his future fate.
