= Octav Troianescu =

Romanian chess player

Personal information
- Born: 4 February 1916 Chernivtsi, Austria-Hungary
- Died: 8 November 1980 (aged 64) Bucharest, Romania

Chess career
- Country: Romania
- Title: International Master (1950)

Octav Troianescu (4 February 1916 — 8 November 1980) was a Romanian chess player, International Master (IM) (1950), five-times Romanian Chess Championship winner (1946, 1954, 1956, 1957, 1968).

== Biography ==
From the mid-1940s to the end of the 1970s Octav Troianescu was one of the strongest Romanian chess players. In Romanian Chess Championships he won nine medals, including five gold (1946, 1954, 1956, 1957, 1968) medals. In 1957, Octav Troianescu participated in World Chess Championship Zonal tournament in Wageningen and ranked 9th place. Octav Troianescu's individual success in the international arena included 3rd place in Bucharest (1951), 2nd place in Sopot (1951) and 3rd place in Erfurt (1955). In 1950, he was a first Romanian chess player who awarded the FIDE International Master (IM) title.

Octav Troianescu played for Romania in the Chess Olympiads:

- In 1956, at third board in the 12th Chess Olympiad in Moscow (+5, =10, -2),
- In 1960, at reserve board in the 14th Chess Olympiad in Leipzig (+2, =5, -4).

Octav Troianescu played for Romania in the European Team Chess Championship preliminaries:

- In 1957, at first board in the 1st European Team Chess Championship preliminaries (+0, =2, -2),
- In 1961, at five board in the 2nd European Team Chess Championship preliminaries (+0, =2, -2),
- In 1970, at reserve board in the 4th European Team Chess Championship preliminaries (+0, =0, -1),
- In 1977, at reserve board in the 6th European Team Chess Championship preliminaries (+0, =1, -0).

Octav Troianescu played for Romania in the Men's Chess Balkaniads:

- In 1946, at first board in the 1st Men's Chess Balkaniad (+2, =0, -1) and won team and individual silver medals,
- In 1947, at second board in the 2nd Men's Chess Balkaniad (+0, =0, -2).
