= Mihai Șubă =

Romanian-Spanish chess grandmaster (1947–2025)

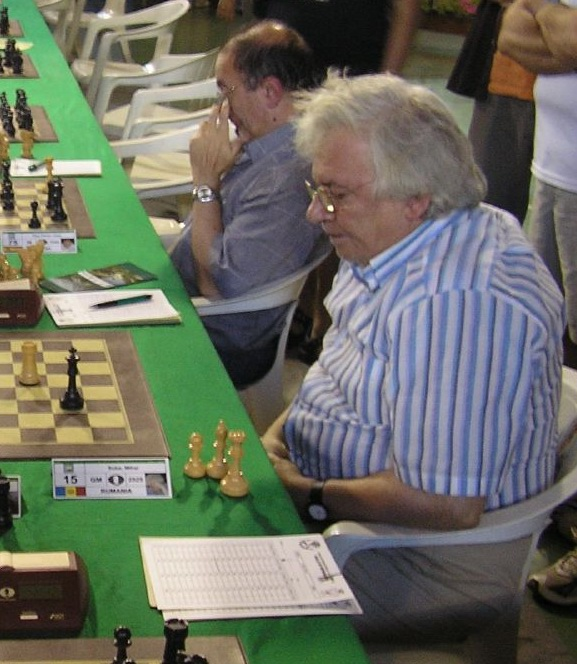

Personal information
- Born: 1 June 1947 Bucharest, Romania
- Died: 25 October 2025 (aged 78) Spain

Chess career
- Country: Romania (until 1989; 1992–2017); England (1989–1992); Spain (2017–2025)
- Title: Grandmaster (1978)
- Peak rating: 2580 (July 1986)
- Peak ranking: No. 20 (July 1986)

Mihai Șubă (Romanian pronunciation: [miˈhaj ˈʃubə]; 1 June 1947 – 26 October 2025) was a Romanian and Spanish chess player. FIDE awarded him the International Master title in 1975 and the Grandmaster title in 1978.

== Chess career ==
Born in Bucharest, Romania, Șubă won the Romanian Chess Championship in 1980, 1981, and 1985. Șubă began playing chess at the late age of 19 years old, making him an anomaly among grandmasters. He attended the University of Bucharest and trained in the university's chess club, where his passion for chess grew quickly. He progressed rapidly and by age 27 he had won several local championships and achieved a FIDE rating of 2460.

Șubă first came to wide attention in 1982 when he finished second, after Zoltán Ribli, at Băile Herculane. At the 1982 Las Palmas Interzonal, he finished third, behind Ribli and former World Champion Vasily Smyslov, just missing qualification for the Candidates Matches. Șubă finished first at Dortmund 1983, and equal first at Prague 1985 and Timișoara 1987.

At the Lloyds Bank Masters tournament in London in 1988, citing difficulties in obtaining visas and participation in tournaments, as well as blackmail threats by Romanian authorities, Șubă defected from Romania and applied for British political asylum for himself and his son, and planned to have his wife and younger son join them in the future.

He played for England at the 1989 European Team Chess Championship, though he started playing for Romania again in 1992. In 2017 he switched his national federation to Spain. Șubă still participated in chess tournaments later in life.

Șubă was the author of the book Dynamic Chess Strategy (1991) and of the monograph The Hedgehog (2000).

== 2008 World Senior Championship ==
At the 2008 World Senior Chess Championship, Larry Kaufman was named the winner on tiebreakers ahead of Șubă in second place. The tie-breaking system used, erroneously interpreted as mandatory by FIDE, did not match the one published by the organizer, which was the valid one according to newer regulations and had the strength of a contract.

Subsequently, Șubă and Kaufman were retroactively declared joint winners of the championship at a FIDE Presidential Board meeting in March 2009 (with Kaufman keeping his resultant promotion to grandmaster).

== Death ==
Șubă died on 26 October 2025, at the age of 78.
