= Carol Partoș =

Romanian chess player (1936–2015)

Personal information
- Born: 10 August 1936
- Died: 2015

Chess career
- Country: Romania; Switzerland
- Title: International Master (1975)
- Peak rating: 2425 (July 1972)

Carol Partoș (also Charles Partos; 10 August 1936 — 2015) was a Romanian and Swiss chess International Master (1975), Romanian Chess Championship winner (1972).

== Biography ==
From the mid-1960s to the mid-1970s, Carol Partoș was one of the leading Romanian chess players. Three times he won medals of Romanian Chess Championships: gold (1972), silver (1966) and bronze (1965).

Carol Partoș achieved several successes in international chess tournaments: shared 3rd place in Bucharest (1975), 1st place (1978) and shared 3rd place (1979) in Biel Chess Festival.

Carol Partoș emigrated to the Switzerland in the mid-1970s. In 1975, he was awarded the FIDE International Master (IM) title.

Carol Partoș played for Romania and Switzerland in the Chess Olympiads:

- In 1972, at second reserve board in the 20th Chess Olympiad in Skopje (+5, =3, -2),
- In 1974, at first reserve board in the 21st Chess Olympiad in Nice (+4, =4, -3),
- In 1982, at fourth board in the 25th Chess Olympiad in Lucerne (+5, =2, -4),
- In 1986, at fourth board in the 27th Chess Olympiad in Dubai (+2, =4, -3).

Carol Partoș played for Romania in the World Student Team Chess Championship:

- In 1958, at second reserve board in the 5th World Student Team Chess Championship in Varna (+3, =2, -0) and won individual gold medal,
- In 1965, at fourth board in the 12th World Student Team Chess Championship in Sinaia (+5, =3, -1).

Carol Partoș played for Romania in the Men's Chess Balkaniads:

- In 1972, at fifth board in the 4th Men's Chess Balkaniad in Sofia (+2, =0, -2) and won team bronze and individual bronze medals,
- In 1973, at fourth board in the 5th Men's Chess Balkaniad in Poiana Brașov (+3, =1, -0) and won team silver and individual gold medal,
- In 1974, at third board in the 6th Men's Chess Balkaniad in Poreč (+0, =1, -1) and won team silver and individual bronze medal,
- In 1975, at fifth board in the 7th Men's Chess Balkaniad in Istanbul (+1, =3, -0) and won team bronze and individual bronze medal.
