= Petre-Vlad Seimeanu =

Romanian chess player

Personal information
- Born: 26 November 1917
- Died: 19 April 1992 (aged 74)

Chess career
- Country: Romania

Petre-Vlad Seimeanu (26 November 1917 – 19 April 1992) was a Romanian chess player, Romanian Chess Championship winner (1943).

== Biography ==
In 1943, Petre-Vlad Seimeanu won individual Romanian Chess Championship in Bucharest. As a member of the Romanian national chess team, he took part in the 1947 Men's Chess Balkaniad and the international chess match with the French national team in 1955. He also played in the international chess tournament in Bucharest (1949).
