= Elena-Luminița Cosma =

Romanian chess player (born 1972)

Elena-Luminiţa Cosma
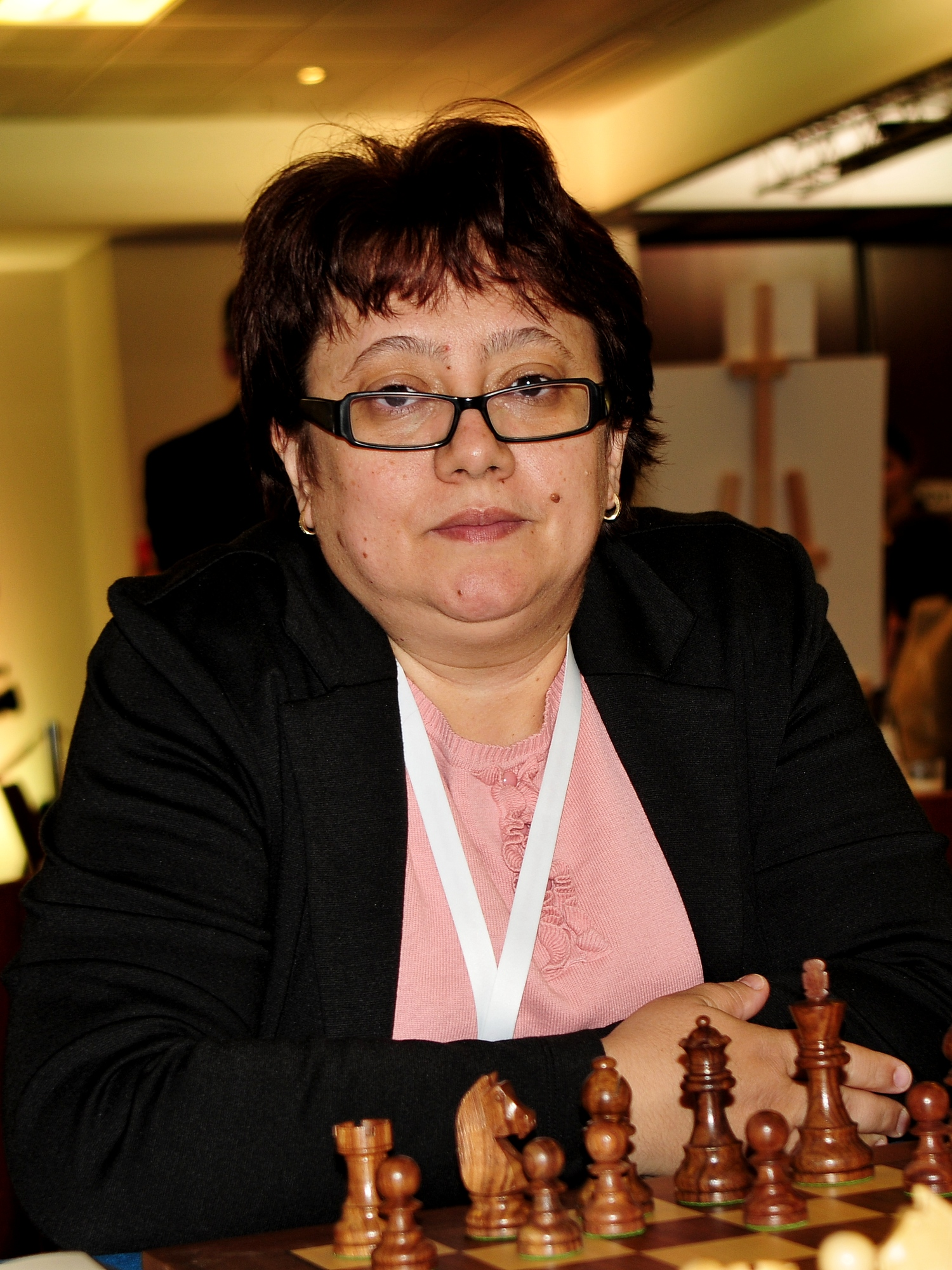
- Elena-Luminița Cosma in 2013

Personal information
- Born: 22 January 1972 (age 54)

Chess career
- Country: Romania
- Title: Woman Grandmaster (1994)
- Peak rating: 2440 (January 2003)

Elena-Luminița Cosma (née Radu, also Radu-Cosma; born 22 January 1972) is a Romanian chess player who holds the title of Woman Grandmaster (WGM, 1994).

== Chess career ==
In 1988 Cosma won silver medal in the World Youth Chess Championship in age category U16. In 1989 she won silver medal in the World Youth Chess Championship in age category U18. In 1990 she won World Youth Chess Championship in age category U18. In 1992 she won silver medal in the girl' World Junior Chess Championship in age category U20. In 1995 in Chișinău Cosma participated in the Women's World Chess Championship cycle Interzonal Tournament.

In Romanian Women's Chess championships Cosma won four gold (1991, 1992, 2010, 2016), three silver (1991, 1994, 2012) and two bronze (2000, 2014) medals.

Three times won the International Women's chess tournament in Bucharest: 1991 (together with Anda Šafranska), 1993, and 1994 (together with Tatiana Shumiakina). In 2006 in Marseille Elena-Luminița Cosma divided first place with Anna Zatonskih and Cristina Adela Foișor in the International Women's chess tournament.

Cosma played for Romania in the Women's Chess Olympiads:

- In 1990, at first reserve board in the 29th Chess Olympiad (women) in Novi Sad (+6, =2, -3),
- In 1992, at third board in the 30th Chess Olympiad (women) in Manila (+3, =5, -2),
- In 1994, at second board in the 31st Chess Olympiad (women) in Moscow (+6, =4, -2),
- In 1996, at third board in the 32nd Chess Olympiad (women) in Yerevan (+6, =4, -1),
- In 1998, at third board in the 33rd Chess Olympiad (women) in Elista (+6, =2, -1) and won individual silver medal,
- In 2000, at second board in the 34th Chess Olympiad (women) in Istanbul (+3, =5, -4),
- In 2008, at second board in the 38th Chess Olympiad (women) in Dresden (+3, =3, -3),
- In 2010, at second board in the 39th Chess Olympiad (women) in Khanty-Mansiysk (+3, =5, -2),
- In 2012, at third board in the 40th Chess Olympiad (women) in Istanbul (+4, =6, -0),
- In 2014, at reserve board in the 41st Chess Olympiad (women) in Tromsø (+6, =1, -1),
- In 2016, at third board in the 42nd Chess Olympiad (women) in Baku (+2, =6, -1).

Cosma played for Romania in the European Team Chess Championships:

- In 1992, at second board in the 1st European Team Chess Championship (women) in Debrecen (+2, =3, -1),
- In 1997, at first reserve board in the 2nd European Team Chess Championship (women) in Pula (+0, =2, -1) and won team silver medal,
- In 1999, at second board in the 3rd European Team Chess Championship (women) in Batumi (+5, =2, -0) and won team bronze medal and two individual gold medals,
- In 2001, at second board in the 4th European Team Chess Championship (women) in León (+1, =3, -2),
- In 2009, at first board in the 8th European Team Chess Championship (women) in Novi Sad (+0, =4, -3),
- In 2011, at third board in the 9th European Team Chess Championship (women) in Porto Carras (+0, =3, -3),
- In 2013, at fourth board in the 10th European Team Chess Championship (women) in Warsaw (+3, =4, -0),
- In 2015, at fourth board in the 11th European Team Chess Championship (women) in Reykjavík (+4, =4, -0).

Cosma played for Romania in the World Team Chess Championship:

- In 2013, at third board in the 4th Women's World Team Chess Championship 2013 in Astana (+0, =5, -2).
