= Bela Badea =

Romanian chess player

Personal information
- Born: February 21, 1969 (age 57) Aiud, Romania

Chess career
- Country: Romania
- Title: Grandmaster (1999)
- Peak rating: 2545 (January 1998)

Bela Badea (born February 21, 1969, Aiud, Romania) is a Romanian chess player. He got his grandmaster (GM) title in 1999. He performed under the name of Takacs until 1989.

In the Romanian individual championships he won 4 medals: two gold (1997, 1998) and two bronze (1988, 2005). He represented Romania in the 1990 and 2000 chess Olympiads.

== Notable tournaments ==
Tournament Name	Year	ELO	Points
Ungureanu mem(Bucharest)	2004	2509	7.0
Ciocaltea mem(Bucharest)	2004	2505	8.0
St Chely d'Aubrac op 3rd(St Chely d'Aubrac)	2003	2499	6.5
St Affrique op 10t h(St Affrique)	2002	2477	7.5
Gausdal Classics IM-B(Gausdal)	2001	2492	6.5
ROM-ch+(Baile Tusnad)	2001	2460	1.5
Bucharest Autumn Cup GM(Bucharest)	2000	2480	9.5
Banc Post Int(Miercurea Ciuc)	2000	2480	7.5
Nereto op 5th(Nereto)	2000	2480	6.0
Samobor(Samobor)	1998	2545	8.0
Lilie op(Litomysl)	1997	2525	5.5
Coca Cola op(Olanesti)	1997	2525	4.5
ROM-chT(Eforie Nord)	1997	2525	6.5
Bratto op 16th(Bratto)	1996	2520	6.5
Bucharest TICC(Bucharest)	1996	2520	11.5
Giessen op(Giessen)	1995	2490	6.0
Bucharest PBP(Bucharest)	1995	2490	11.0
Bucharest2(Bucharest)	1993	2385	6.5
