= Toma Popa =

Romanian chess player (1908–1962)

Personal information
- Born: 20 April 1908
- Died: 25 February 1962 (aged 53)

Chess career
- Country: Romania

Toma Popa (20 April 1908 — 25 February 1962), was a Romanian chess player, Romanian Chess Championship winner (1948).

== Biography ==
From the mid-1930s to the end of the 1940s Toma Popa was one of the strongest Romanian chess players. In 1948, in Bucharest he won Romanian Chess Championship.

Toma Popa played for Romania in the Chess Olympiad:

- In 1935, at reserve board in the 6th Chess Olympiad in Warsaw (+3, =5, -7).

Toma Popa played for Romania in the unofficial Chess Olympiad:

- In 1936, at sixth board in the 3rd unofficial Chess Olympiad in Munich (+7, =5, -7).

Toma Popa played for Romania in the Men's Chess Balkaniads:

- In 1946, at eighth board in the 1st Men's Chess Balkaniad (+1, =2, -0) and won team silver and individual bronze medals,
- In 1947, at seventh board in the 2nd Men's Chess Balkaniad (+1, =0, -1) and won individual silver medal.
