= Mihail-Viorel Ghindă =

Romanian chess player (1949–2023)

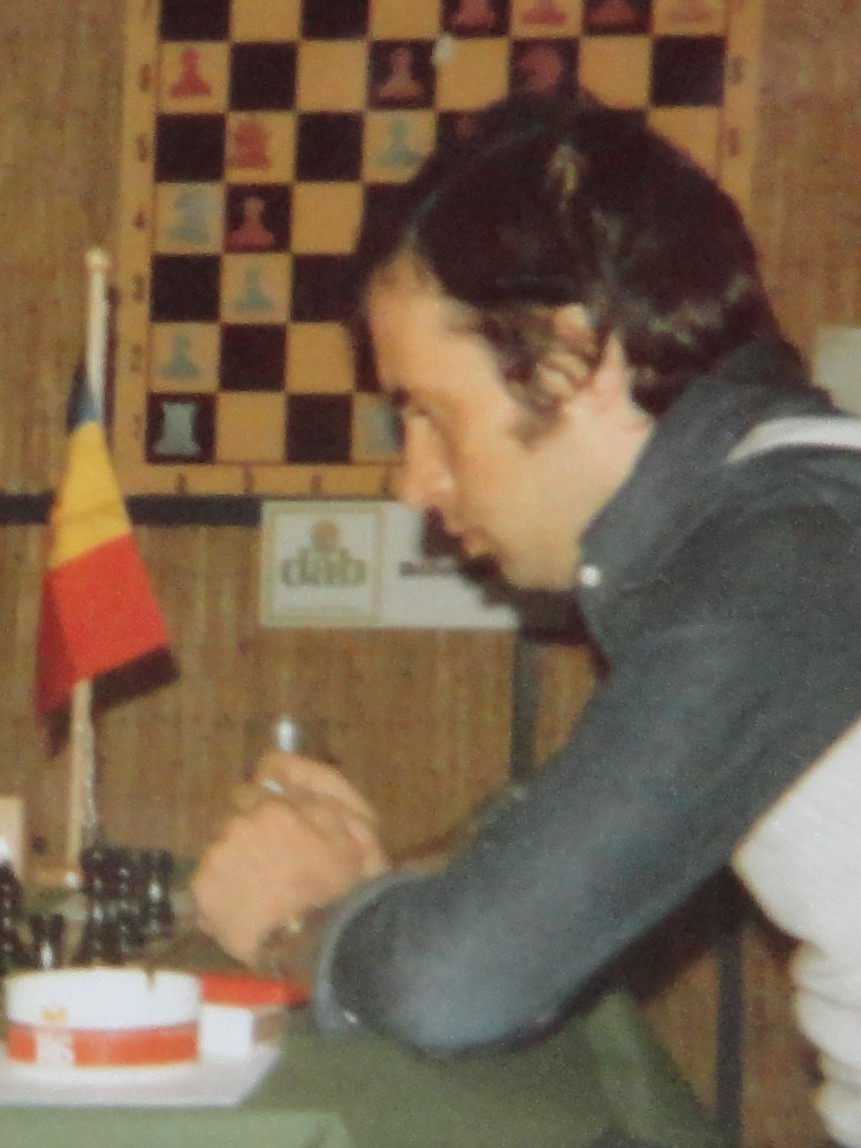
- Mihail-Viorel Ghindă in 1979

Personal information
- Born: 25 July 1949 Bucharest, Romania
- Died: February 2023 (aged 73) Bucharest, Romania

Chess career
- Country: Romania
- Title: International Master (1978)
- Peak rating: 2500 (January 1988)

Mihail-Viorel Ghindă (25 July 1949 – February 2023) was a Romanian chess player, International Master (IM) (1978), four-times Romanian Chess Championship winner (1976, 1978, 1983, 1989).

== Biography ==
From the beginning of the 1970s to the end of the 1980s Mihail-Viorel Ghindă was one of the strongest Romanian chess players. In Romanian Chess Championships he won eight medals: 4 gold (1976, 1978, 1983, 1989), silver (1980) and 3 bronze (1970, 1975, 1985). While he did not manage to become a GM, his peak rating (2500) suggests that when at his best - he was GM strength. In 1990, Mihail-Viorel Ghindă participated in World Chess Championship Zonal tournament in Stara Zagora and shared 5th–6th place. Mihail-Viorel Ghindă's individual success in the international arena included shared 2nd–3rd place in Bankya (1977), 3rd place in Zabrze (1977), 1st place in Blagoevgrad (1979), 1st place in Heidelberg (1979), shared 1st–2nd in Hamburg (1980) and 1st place in Netanya (1987). In 1978, he was awarded the FIDE International Master (IM) title.

Mihail-Viorel Ghindă played for Romania in the Chess Olympiads:

- In 1978, at first reserve board in the 23rd Chess Olympiad in Buenos Aires (+1, =2, -3),
- In 1980, at fourth board in the 24th Chess Olympiad in La Valletta (+4, =5, -1),
- In 1982, at fourth board in the 25th Chess Olympiad in Lucerne (+5, =4, -2),
- In 1984, at third board in the 26th Chess Olympiad in Thessaloniki (+5, =5, -2),
- In 1986, at fourth board in the 27th Chess Olympiad in Dubai (+5, =3, -2),
- In 1988, at fourth board in the 28th Chess Olympiad in Thessaloniki (+3, =0, -4),
- In 1990, at fourth board in the 29th Chess Olympiad in Novi Sad (+1, =4, -3).

Mihail-Viorel Ghindă played for Romania in the European Team Chess Championships:

- In 1973, at seventh board in the 5th European Team Chess Championship in Bath (+1, =1, -3),
- In 1977, at seventh board in the 6th European Team Chess Championship in Moscow (+0, =1, -0).

Mihail-Viorel Ghindă played for Romania in the World Team Chess Championship:

- In 1985, at fifth board in the 1st World Team Chess Championship in Lucerne (+3, =4, -2).

Mihail-Viorel Ghindă played for Romania in the Men's Chess Balkaniads:

- In 1974, at sixth board in the 6th Men's Chess Balkaniad in Poreč (+1, =2, -0) and won team and individual silver medals,
- In 1975, at sixth board in the 7th Men's Chess Balkaniad in Istanbul (+0, =2, -0) and won team and individual bronze medals,
- In 1977, at fourth board in the 9th Men's Chess Balkaniad in Albena (+3, =1, -0) and won team and individual gold medals,
- In 1978, at fourth board in the 10th Men's Chess Balkaniad in Băile Herculane (+3, =1, -0) and won team silver and individual gold medals,
- In 1979, at third board in the 11th Chess Balkaniad in Bihać (+2, =2, -1) and won team and individual bronze medals,
- In 1980, at fourth board in the 12th Chess Balkaniad in Istanbul (+3, =2, -0) and won team silver and individual gold medals,
- In 1981, at third board in the 13th Chess Balkaniad in Athens (+2, =2, -0) and won team silver and individual gold medals,
- In 1982, at third board in the 14th Chess Balkaniad in Plovdiv (+1, =4, -0) and won team bronze and individual silver medals,
- In 1983, at third board in the 15th Chess Balkaniad in Băile Herculane (+4, =0, -0) and won team bronze and individual gold medals,
- In 1985, at third board in the 17th Chess Balkaniad in Irakleio (+1, =3, -0) and won team and individual silver medals,
- In 1986, at first board in the 18th Chess Balkaniad in Sofia (+0, =1, -3) and won team bronze medal,
- In 1988, at second board in the 19th Chess Balkaniad in Kaštel Stari (+0, =6, -0) and won team bronze and individual silver medals,
- In 1990, at fifth board in the 21st Chess Balkaniad in Kavala (+2, =3, -1) and won team and individual silver medals.
