= Vlad-Victor Bârnaure =

Romanian chess player (born 1986)

Personal information
- Born: 4 November 1986 (age 39)

Chess career
- Country: Romania
- Title: International Master (2006)
- FIDE rating: 2458 (July 2026)
- Peak rating: 2518 (June 2014)

Vlad-Victor Bârnaure (born 4 November 1986) is a Romanian chess player, International Master (IM) (2006), Romanian Chess Championship winner (2014).

== Chess career ==
Vlad-Victor Bârnaure played for Romania in European Youth Chess Championships and World Youth Chess Championships. The best result - 10th place in World Youth Chess Championship in U18 age group. In 2011 he won Irish Chess Team Championship with chess club Adare. In 2014, in Târgu Mureș Vlad-Victor Bârnaure won the Romanian Chess Championship.

In 2006, Vlad-Victor Barnaure was awarded the FIDE International Master (IM) title.
