= Ivan Halic =

Romanian chess player

Personal information
- Born: 18 September 1910
- Died: 8 July 1978 (aged 67)

Chess career
- Country: Romania

Ivan Halic (also Ioan Halic; 18 September 1910 – 8 July 1978) was a Romanian chess player, Romanian Chess Championship winner (1936).

== Biography ==
In 1936, Ivan Halic won individual Romanian Chess Championship in Bucharest. As a member of the Romanian national team, he took part in the 3rd unofficial Chess Olympiad in 1936. Ivan Halic was participant in the Hungarian Chess Championship in 1937 (played out of competition, the championship was held with the participation of foreign chess players). He also played in the international chess tournament in Bucharest (1949).
