= Andrei Istrățescu =

Romanian chess player

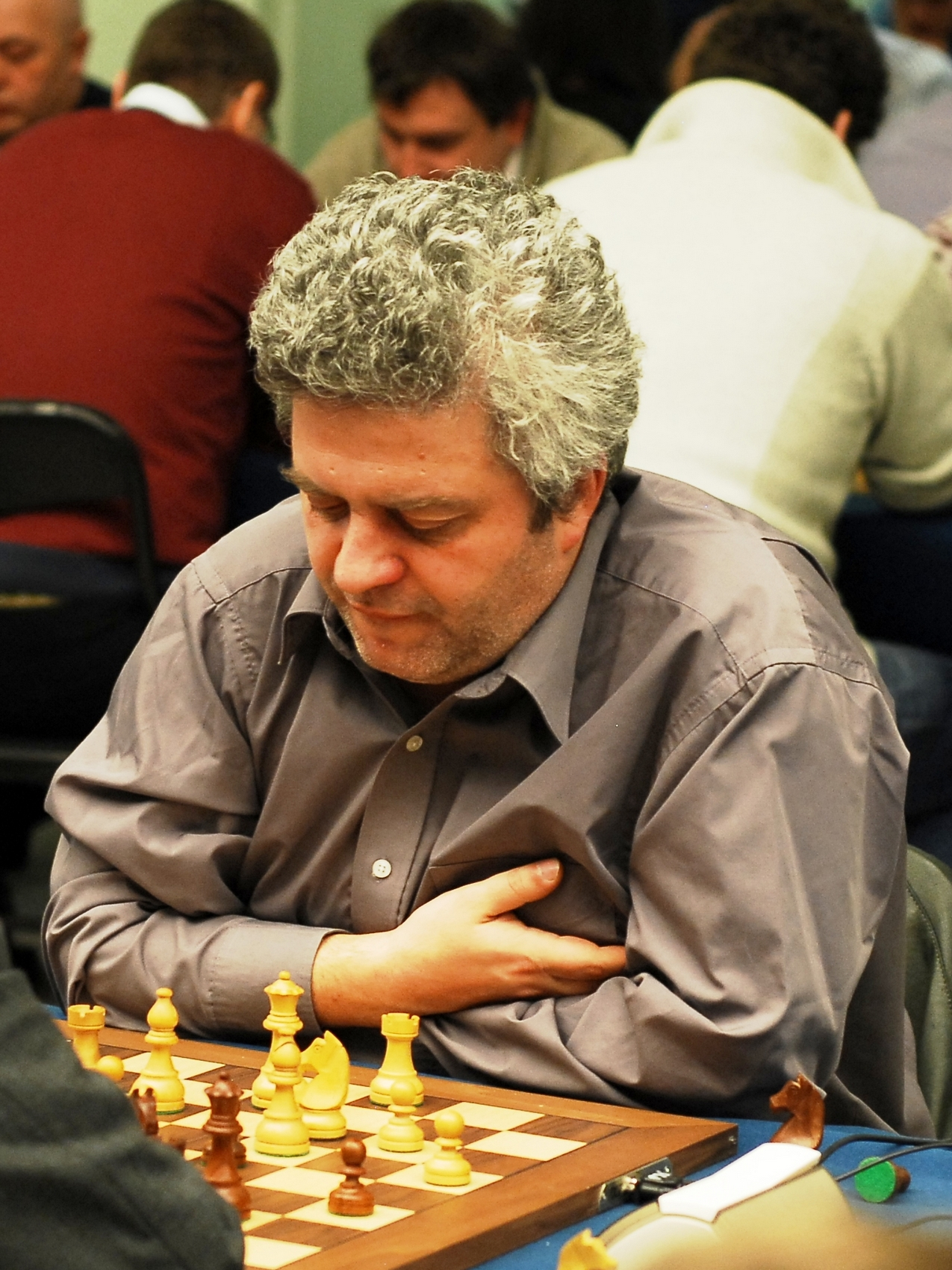
- Istrățescu in 2012

Personal information
- Born: 3 December 1975 (age 50) Romania

Chess career
- Country: Romania; France (2011–2017)
- Title: Grandmaster (1994)
- Peak rating: 2677 (January 2014)
- Peak ranking: No. 70 (July 2002)

Andrei Istrățescu (born 3 December 1975) is a Romanian chess grandmaster. He competed in the FIDE World Chess Championship in 1998 and in the FIDE World Cup in 2005 and 2013. Istrățescu has played for the Romanian national team in the Chess Olympiad, the European Team Chess Championship and the Chess Balkaniads. He represented France from 2011 to 2017. In 2004 he finished in second place behind Anatoly Karpov in the rapid knockout tournament in Aix en Provence. Subsequently, a rematch was set up in Bucharest: four classical games and four rapid games. The final score was 6–2 in favour of Karpov.

== Selected tournament victories ==
- 1991: Winner of the U16 European Youth Chess Championship.
- 1992: Winner of the Romanian Chess Championship.
- 2001: Victory at Bucharest Spring 2001.
- 2001: Victory at first Rohde Open (Sautron, France).
- 2003: Victory at 3rd Rohde Open.
- 2004: Victory at 4th Open of Plancoët, France.
- 2009/10: Winner (with Romain Edouard, David Howell and Mark Hebden) of the Hastings International Chess Congress.
