= Constantin Ionescu (chess player) =

Romanian chess grandmaster (1958–2024)

Personal information
- Born: 12 September 1958 Brașov, Romania
- Died: 31 July 2024 (aged 65)

Chess career
- Country: Romania
- Title: Grandmaster (1988)
- Peak rating: 2545 (July 1995)

Constantin Ionescu (12 September 1958 – 31 July 2024) was a Romanian Grandmaster (GM) (1988), Romanian Chess Championship winner (1999), World Team Chess Championship individual bronze medalist (1985).

== Biography ==
From the early 1980s to the late 1990s, Constantin Ionescu was one of the leading Romanian chess players. He won eight individual Romanian Chess Championships medals: gold (1999, together with Mihail Marin), four silver (1982, 1984, 1989, 1990) and three bronze (1979, 1992, 2000). Constantin Ionescu achieved many individual chess tournament successes, winning or shared the first places, among others in Manresa (1993), Bucharest (1993), Balatonberény (1996), Bucharest (2002).

Constantin Ionescu played for Romania in the Chess Olympiads:

- In 1986, at third board in the 27th Chess Olympiad in Dubai (+4, =5, -2),
- In 1988, at second board in the 28th Chess Olympiad in Thessaloniki (+6, =2, -4),
- In 1990, at third board in the 29th Chess Olympiad in Novi Sad (+2, =2, -4),
- In 1992, at third board in the 30th Chess Olympiad in Manila (+5, =4, -3),
- In 1994, at second board in the 31st Chess Olympiad in Moscow (+5, =4, -2),
- In 1996, at third board in the 32nd Chess Olympiad in Yerevan (+1, =9, -1),
- In 1998, at fourth board in the 33rd Chess Olympiad in Elista (+1, =10, -0),
- In 2000, at fourth board in the 34th Chess Olympiad in Istanbul (+6, =3, -2).

Constantin Ionescu played for Romania in the World Team Chess Championship:

- In 1985, at second reserve board in the 1st World Team Chess Championship in Lucerne (+0, =5, -0) and won individual bronze medal.

Constantin Ionescu played for Romania in the European Team Chess Championship:

- In 1989, at second board in the 9th European Team Chess Championship in Haifa (+3, =4, -2),
- In 1992, at fourth board in the 10th European Team Chess Championship in Debrecen (+1, =3, -2),
- In 1999, at fourth board in the 12th European Team Chess Championship in Batumi (+1, =2, -2).

Constantin Ionescu played for Romania in the Men's Chess Balkaniads:

- In 1980, at first reserve board in the 12th Chess Balkaniad in Istanbul (+1, =0, -0) and won team silver and individual gold medals,
- In 1981, at first reserve board in the 13th Chess Balkaniad in Athens (+1, =0, -1) and won team silver and individual bronze medals,
- In 1982, at sixth board in the 14th Chess Balkaniad in Plovdiv (+2, =1, -1) and won team bronze and individual silver medals,
- In 1983, at sixth board in the 15th Chess Balkaniad in Băile Herculane (+1, =2, -1) and won team bronze and individual silver medals,
- In 1985, at first reserve board in the 17th Chess Balkaniad in Irakleio (+2, =1, -0) and won team silver and individual gold medals,
- In 1986, at second board in the 18th Chess Balkaniad in Sofia (+1, =3, -2) and won team bronze medal,
- In 1988, at third board in the 19th Chess Balkaniad in Kaštel Stari (+1, =4, -1) and won team bronze and individual silver medals,
- In 1990, at third board in the 21st Chess Balkaniad in Kavala (+1, =5, -0) and won team silver and individual gold medals,
- In 1992, at first board in the 23rd Chess Balkaniad in Mangalia (+0, =1, -2) and won team bronze medal,
- In 1993, at first board in the 24th Chess Balkaniad in Ankara (+3, =1, -0) and won team bronze and individual gold medals,
- In 1994, at first board in the 25th Chess Balkaniad in Varna (+4, =1, -0) and won individual gold medal.

In 1983, he was awarded the FIDE International Master (IM) title and in 1988 he received the FIDE Grandmaster (GM) title.

Ionescu died on 31 July 2024, at the age of 65.
