= Constantin Lupulescu =

Romanian chess grandmaster (born 1984)

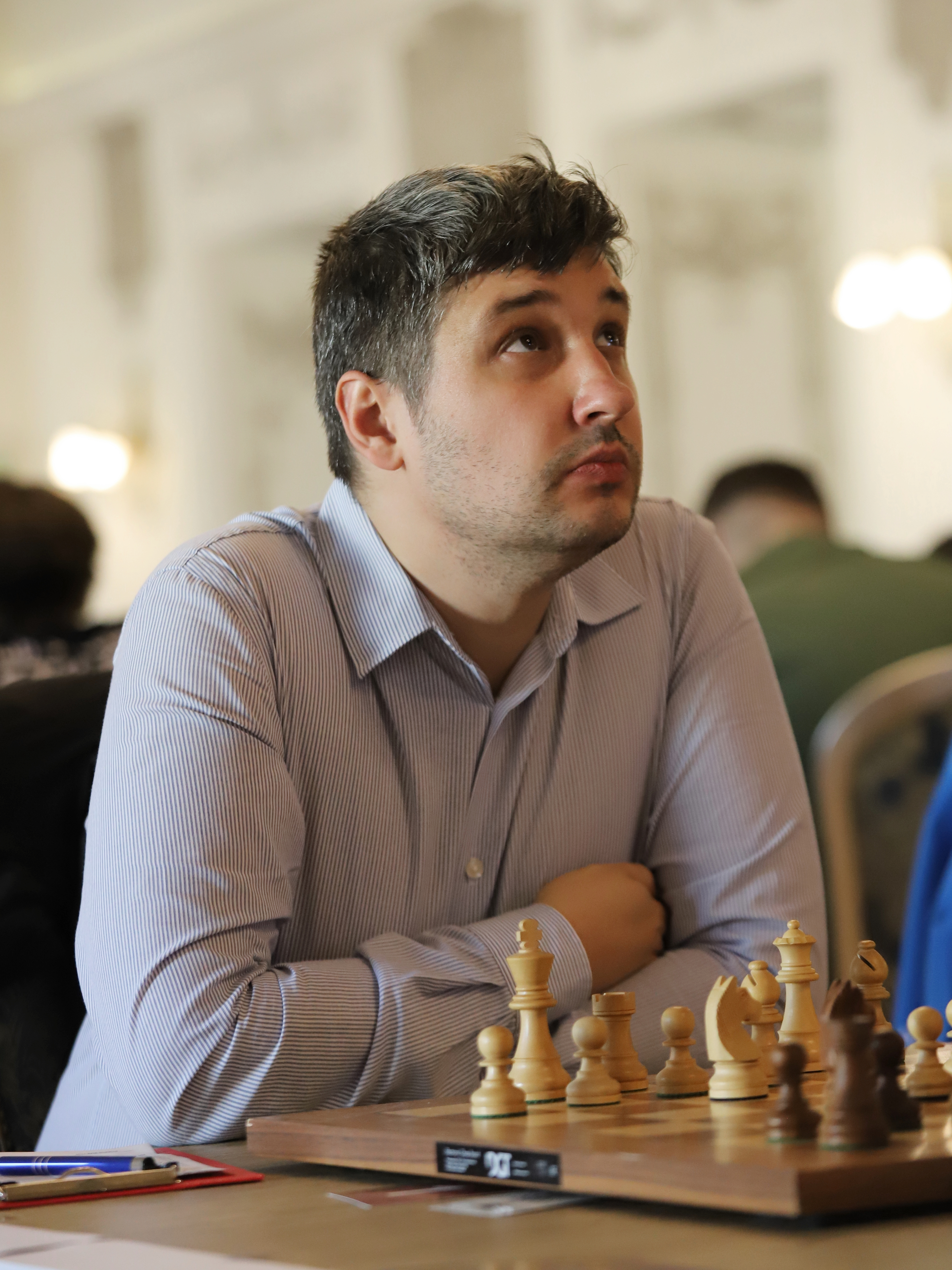
- Constantin Lupulescu, 2021

Personal information
- Born: 25 March 1984 (age 42) Buftea, Romania

Chess career
- Country: Romania
- Title: Grandmaster (2006)
- FIDE rating: 2569 (September 2026)
- Peak rating: 2660 (April 2014)
- Peak ranking: No. 79 (September 2021)

Constantin Lupulescu (born 25 March 1984) is a Romanian chess grandmaster and a five-time Romanian Chess Champion. He has competed in the FIDE World Cup in 2009, 2011, 2013, 2015 and 2019, 2021.

== Chess career ==
Lupulescu won the Romanian Chess Championship in 2007, 2010, 2011, 2013 and 2015. He has played for Romania in the Chess Olympiad since 2004 and in the European Team Chess Championship since 2005. He placed clear first in Bucharest 2003 and Bucharest 2006 tournaments, tied for first with Vladislav Nevednichy in Timişoara 2006, placed second in the Victor Ciocaltea Memorial in Bucharest 2008 and tied for 4–8th with Tamaz Gelashvili, Anton Filippov, Nidjat Mamedov and Alexander Zubarev in the Open Romgaz Tournament in Bucharest 2008. In 2013 he tied for 1st–8th with Alexander Moiseenko, Evgeny Romanov, Alexander Beliavsky, Hrant Melkumyan, Francisco Vallejo Pons, Sergei Movsesian, Ian Nepomniachtchi, Alexey Dreev and Evgeny Alekseev in the European Individual Chess Championship. In 2014, he shared first place with Ernesto Inarkiev in the Baku Open, placing second on tiebreak. He won the Reykjavik Open in 2019.

Lupulescu is an expert in dynamic openings (Benoni with Black) and regularly employs solid middlegame strategy.
