= Olănești =

- Village
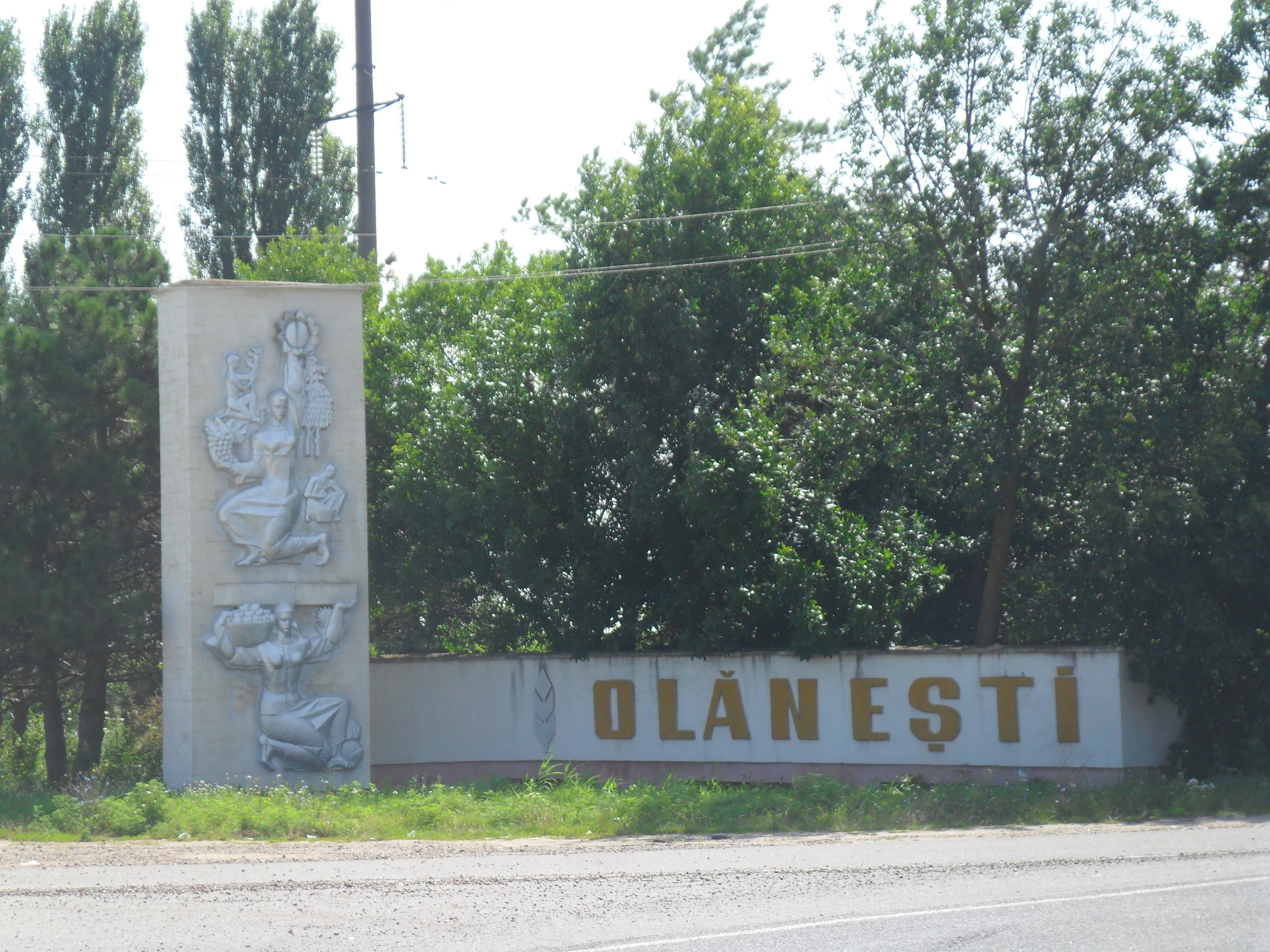

- Location within Moldova
- Coordinates: 46°29′40″N 29°55′25″E
- Country: Moldova

Government
  - Mayor: Petru Marcov (PLDM)

Area
  - Total: 53.39 km^{2} (20.61 sq mi)
- Elevation: 44 m (144 ft)

Population (2014 census)
  - Total: 4,456
- Time zone: UTC+2 (EET)
  - Summer (DST): UTC+3 (EEST)
- Postal code: MD-4225
- Area code: (242) x-xx-xx

Olănești is a village in Ștefan Vodă District, Moldova.

On 23 February 1932, in front of Olănești, at the Soviet bank of the Dniester river, 40 out of a group of 60 unarmed ethnic Romanians from Transnistria who were attempting to escape from the Soviet Union into Romania were massacred by Soviet border troops and by agents of the State Political Directorate (GPU). Victims included women and children. The massacre was discussed on 26 February in the Parliament of Romania, but no measures were taken. Soviet authorities treated all accusations as "capitalist propaganda".

From May 26, 1941, to June 1959, the village was the administrative center of the abolished Olănești District.

In 2025, a monument to the border guard heroes of the 2nd Regiment “Cetatea Albă” was inaugurated in Ștefan Vodă in connection with the history of the village of Olănești. The monument was created by Veaceslav Jiglichi.

== Population ==
By Population Census 2004 in Olănești live 5297 people (2511 men, 2786 women).
