= Merei =

- Commune
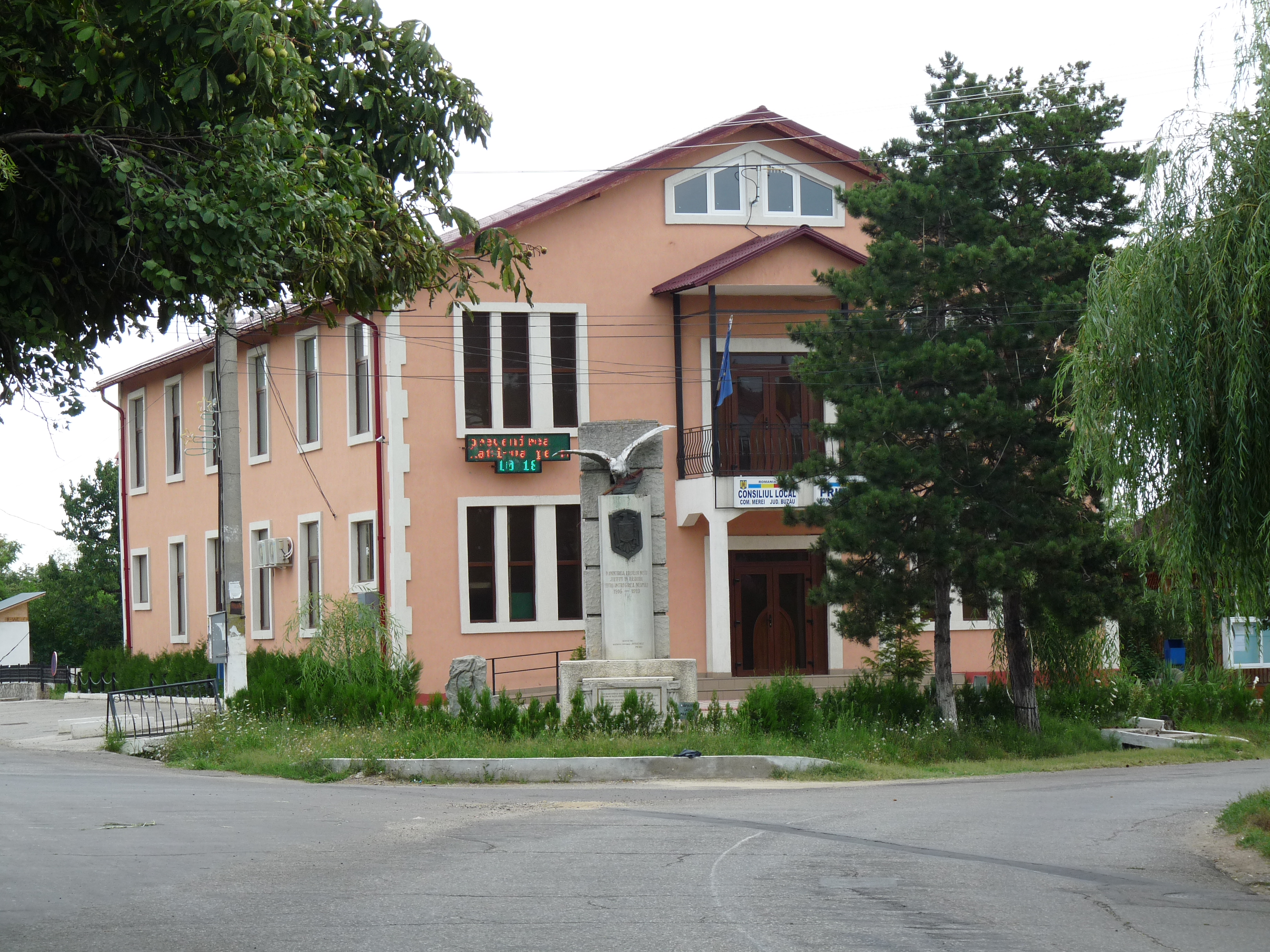
- Merei town hall

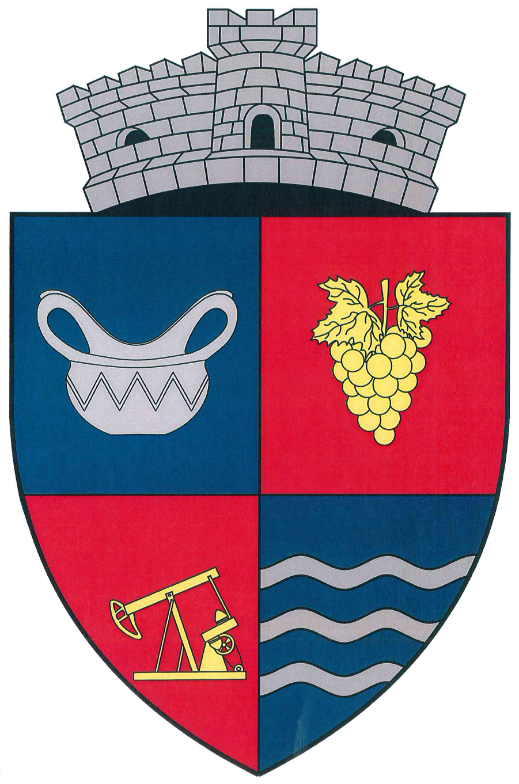
- Coat of arms

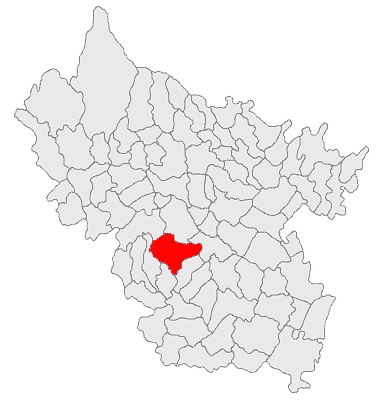
- Location in Buzău County

- Location in Romania
- Coordinates: 45°8′N 26°41′E
- Country: Romania
- County: Buzău
- Established: 1967
- Subdivisions: Ciobănoaia, Dealul Viei, Dobrilești, Gura Sărății, Izvoru Dulce, Lipia, Merei, Nenciulești, Ogrăzile, Sărata-Monteoru, Valea Puțului

Government
  - Mayor (2020–2024): Ștefan Chircă (PSD)
- Area: 108 km^{2} (42 sq mi)
- Elevation: 141 m (463 ft)
- Population (2021-12-01): 6,785
  - Density: 62.8/km^{2} (163/sq mi)
- Time zone: UTC+02:00 (EET)
  - Summer (DST): UTC+03:00 (EEST)
- Postal code: 127355
- Area code: +(40) 238
- Vehicle reg.: BZ
- Website: primariamerei.ro

Merei is a commune in Buzău County, Muntenia, Romania. It is composed of eleven villages: Ciobănoaia, Dealul Viei, Dobrilești, Gura Sărății, Izvoru Dulce, Lipia, Merei, Nenciulești, Ogrăzile, Sărata-Monteoru, and Valea Puțului.

Historical population
Year	Pop.	±%
2002	7,251	—
2011	6,803	−6.2%
2021	6,785	−0.3%
Source: Census data

== Notes ==
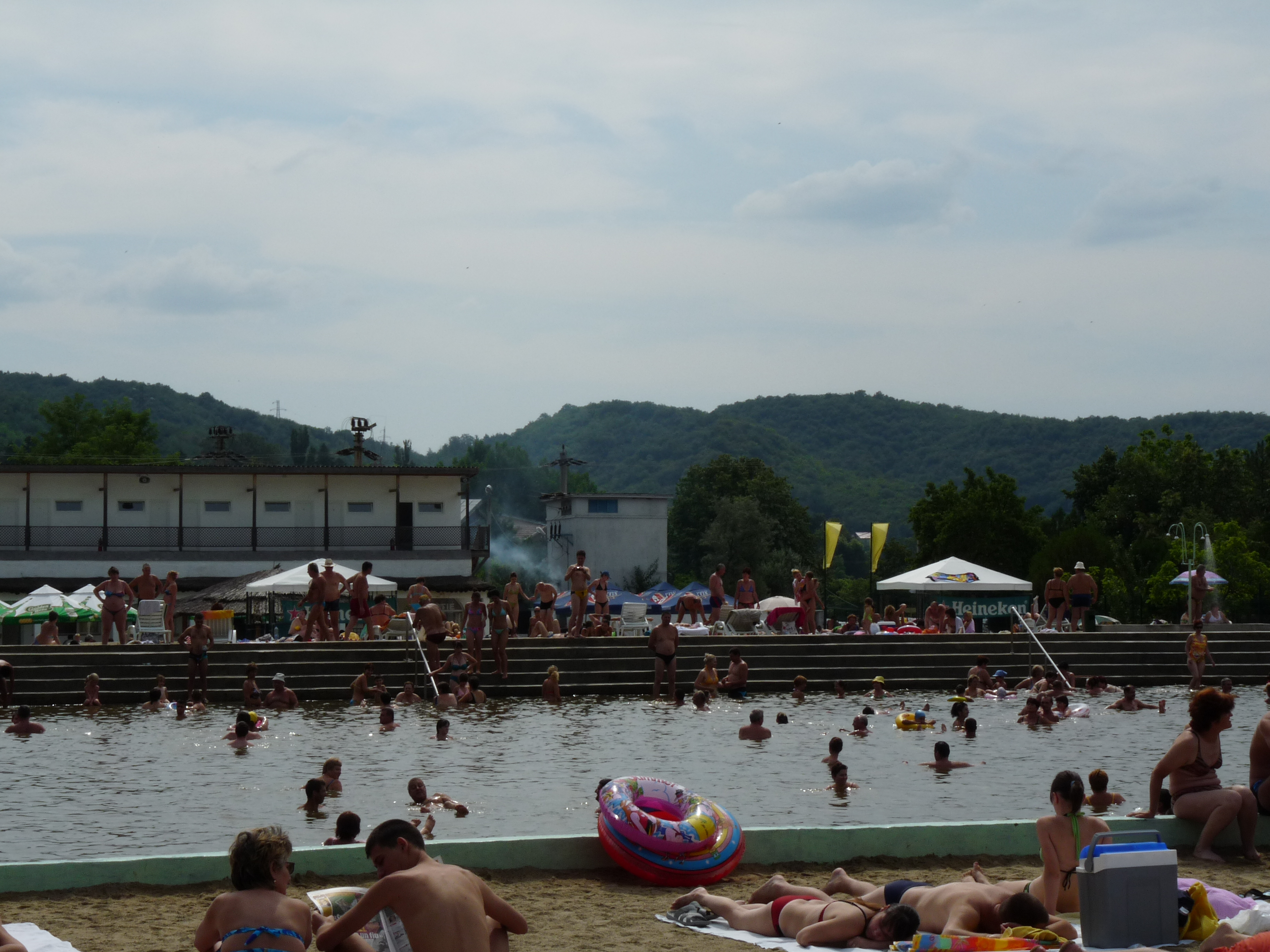
The salt water pool in Sărata Monteoru

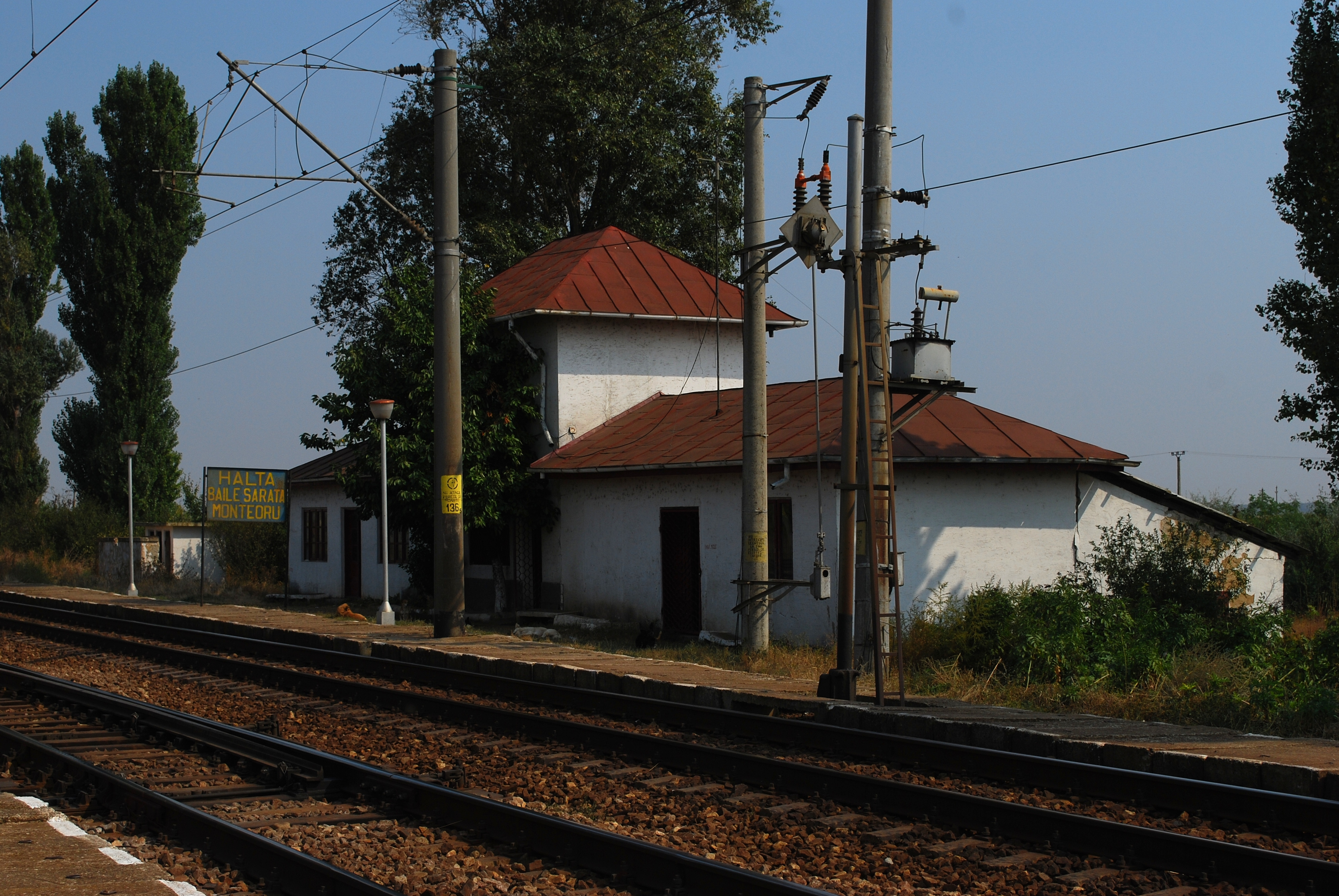
The Sărata Monteoru Baths halt on the Buzău–Ploiești railway

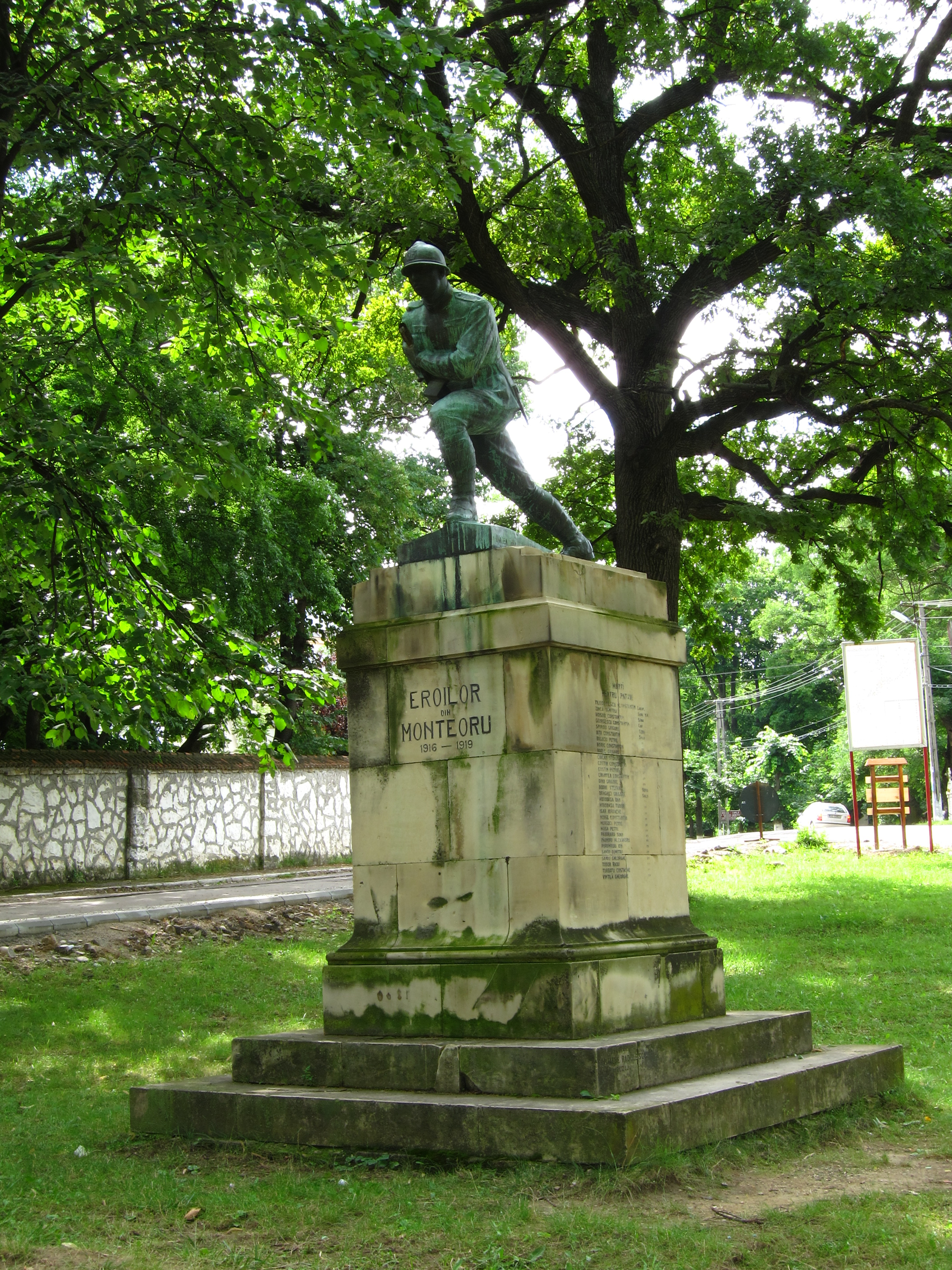
World War I monument in Sărata-Monteoru

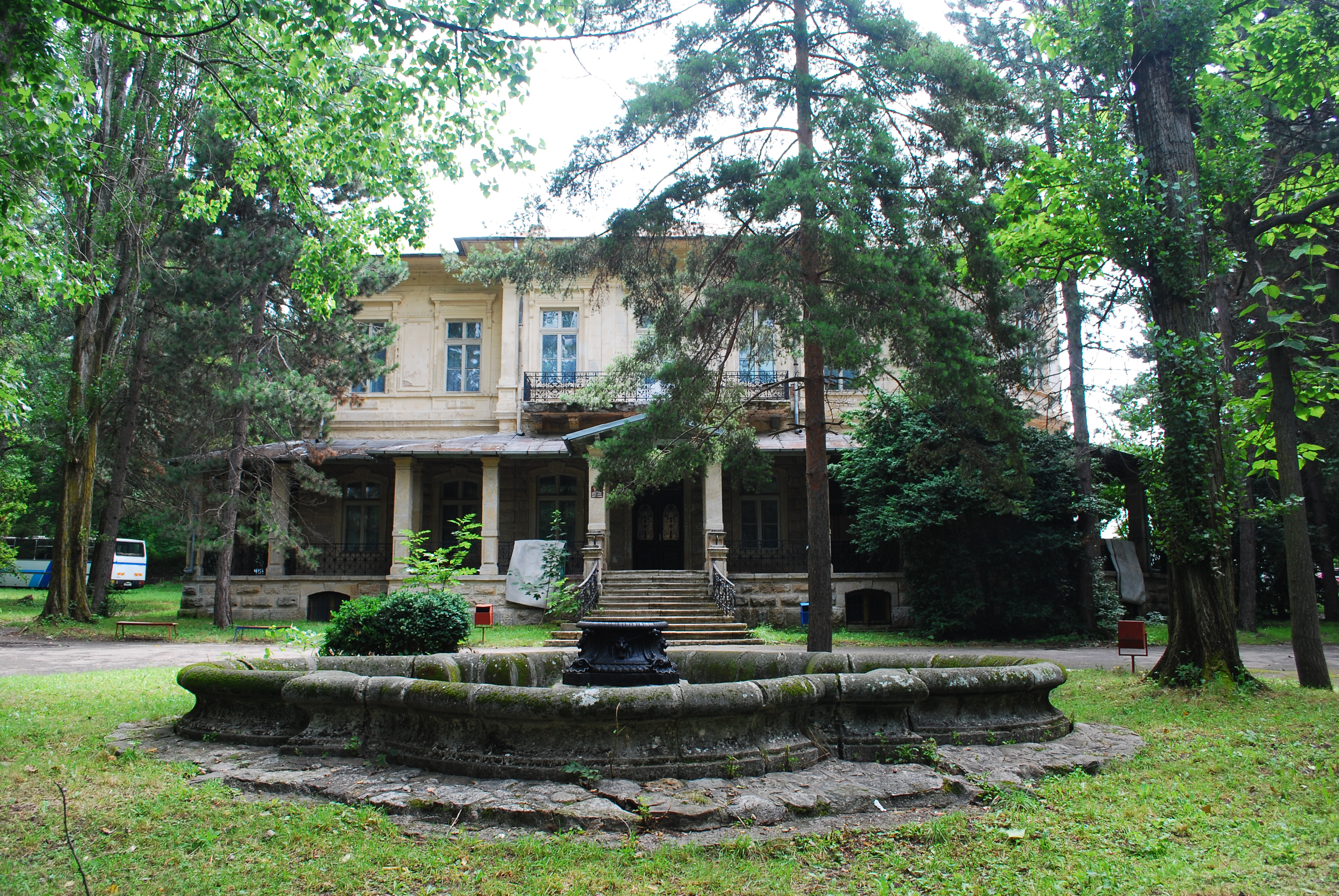
The Monteoru villa in Sărata Monteoru
