= Halič (disambiguation) =

Halič may refer to:

- Halič, Slovak and Czech name for Galicia (Eastern Europe)
- Halič, a village in Slovakia
- Stará Halič, a village in Slovakia
