= Adrian Negulescu =

Romanian chess player

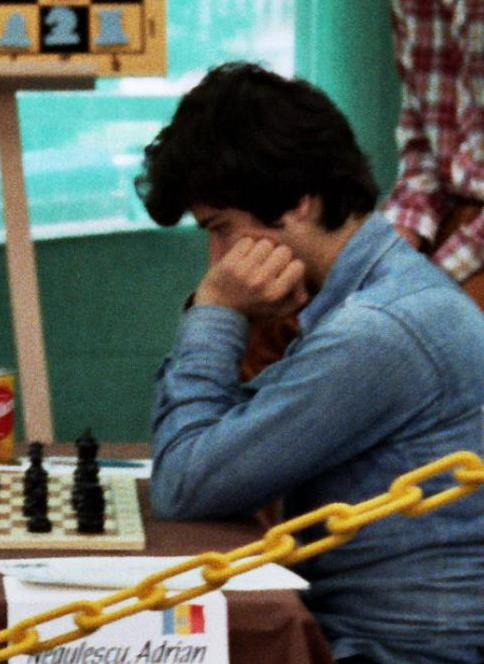
- Adrian Negulescu in 1980

Personal information
- Born: 10 June 1961 (age 65)

Chess career
- Country: Romania
- Title: International Master (1981)
- Peak rating: 2510 (July 2000)

Adrian Negulescu (born 10 June 1961) is a Romanian chess player, International Master (IM) (1981), Romanian Chess Championship winner (1986).

== Biography ==
At the turn of 1979 and 1980, Adrian Negulescu won the bronze medal in Groningen at the European Junior Chess Championship (won by Alexander Chernin before Zurab Azmaiparashvili). He also took part in the World Youth Chess Championships in 1977 (in U16 age group), 1979 (in U18 age group) and 1980 (in U20 age group), achieving his best result in these competitions in 1980 in Dortmund (World Junior Chess Championship), where he finished 4th (behind Garry Kasparov, Nigel Short and Iván Morovic). Adrian Negulescu competed many times in the individual finals of the Romanian Chess Championship, winning two medals: gold (1986) and silver (1988). In 1989, he represented the country at the Haifa in European Team Chess Championship, where the Romanian chess players took 6th place. Adrian Negulescu played twice (1982, 1994) in the Men's Chess Balkaniads and in 1982 in Plovdiv winning the bronze medal. In 1998, he shared the 2nd place (after Vladislav Nevednichy, together with Daniel Moldovan) in the round-robin tournament in Brașov.

Adrian Negulescu achieved the highest rating in his career on July 1, 2000, with a score of 2510 points, he was then 7th among Romanian chess players.
