= Alexandru Tyroler =

Hungarian-Romanian chess player

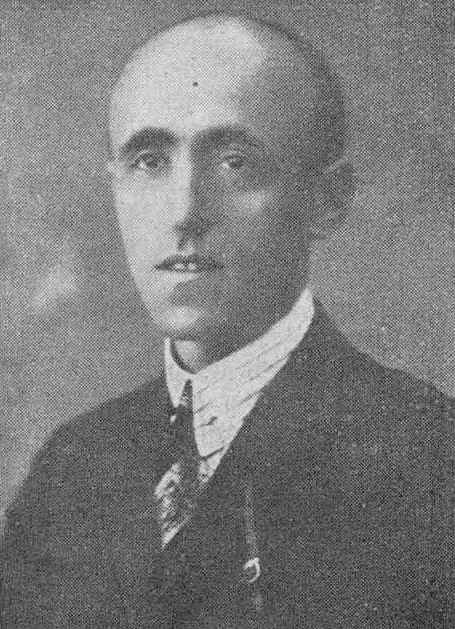
Alexandru Tyroler

Alexandru (Sándor) Tyroler (October 19, 1891, Garamszentkereszt, now Žiar nad Hronom, Slovakia-February 3, 1973, in Budapest, Hungary) was a chess master who won the first three Romanian championships.

Sándor Tyroler was born in Garamszentkereszt (Slovak: Hronský Svätý Kríž, German: Heiligenkreuz an der Gran) in Austro-Hungarian Empire (now Slovakia) into a Hungarian Jewish family. After World War I, following the Treaty of Trianon (1920), he became a citizen of Romania.

In 1912, he took 5th in Temesvár (Austria-Hungary), now Timișoara, Romania. In 1925, he won in Bucharest. In 1926, he won the first Romanian championship in Sibiu. In 1927, he won in Bucharest (ROM-ch). In 1928, he took 15th in The Hague (Amateur World Championship, Max Euwe won). In 1929, he won in Iaşi (ROM-ch). In 1929, he took 6th in Bucharest. In 1930, he took 3rd in Cernăuţi (ROM-ch).

Tyroler represented Romania in the 2nd unofficial Chess Olympiad at Budapest 1926, where he won the team bronze medal. He also played at 3rd board (+4 –7 =4) in the 3rd Chess Olympiad at Hamburg 1930.
