= Vladislav Nevednichy =

Romanian chess grandmaster (born 1969)

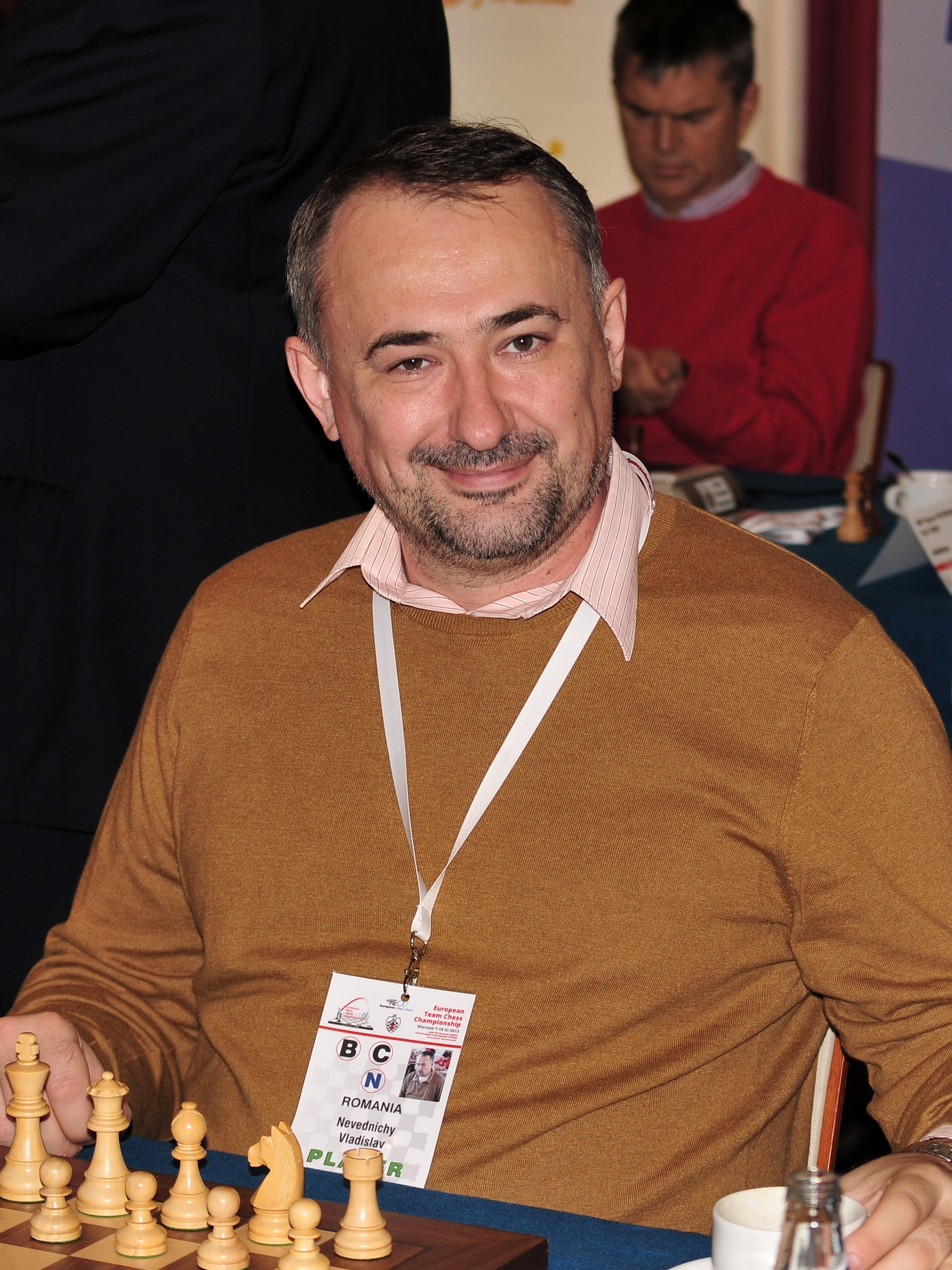
- Vladislav Nevednicii, Warsaw 2013

Personal information
- Born: September 3, 1969 (age 56)

Chess career
- Country: Romania
- Title: Grandmaster (1993)
- FIDE rating: 2441 (July 2026)
- Peak rating: 2604 (December 2013)

Vladislav Nevednichy (born September 3, 1969) is a Romanian chess Grandmaster (1993) and Romanian champion in 2008 and 2012. He took part in the FIDE World Chess Championship 2000, but was knocked out in the second round by Jeroen Piket. In 2007 he participated in the World Cup in Khanty-Mansiysk, Russia where he was eliminated in the 2nd round.

He played for Moldova in the 30th Chess Olympiad in Manila 1992 and for Romania in the Chess Olympiads of 1994, 1996, 1998, 2002, 2004, 2006, 2012, and 2014. He tied for first with Kaido Külaots at Paks 2003 and tied for first with Constantin Lupulescu at Timişoara 2006.

He won the Romanian Individual National Championship in 2008 and 2012.

In the May 2011 FIDE list, he has an Elo rating of 2542, making him Romania's number eight.
