= Sergio Cacho Reigadas =

Spanish chess player (born 1974)

Personal information
- Born: April 19, 1974 (age 52) Santander, Spain

Chess career
- Country: Spain
- Title: International Master (1997)
- FIDE rating: 2495 (July 2026)
- Peak rating: 2532 (July 2011)

Sergio Cacho Reigadas is a Spanish chess player.

== Career ==
He won the 1994 Spanish Chess Championship and the 1996 Universities World Championship Tournament (defeating Pablo San Segundo Carrillo on tiebreaks).

He was a member of the winning team of the Spanish League 2015, Solvay, along with teammates Pentala Harikrishna, Surya Shekhar Ganguly, Aleksander Delchev, Adhiban Baskaran, Jesus Maria De La Villa Garcia, and Elizbar Ubilava.
