= Arturo Pomar =

Spanish chess grandmaster (1931–2016)

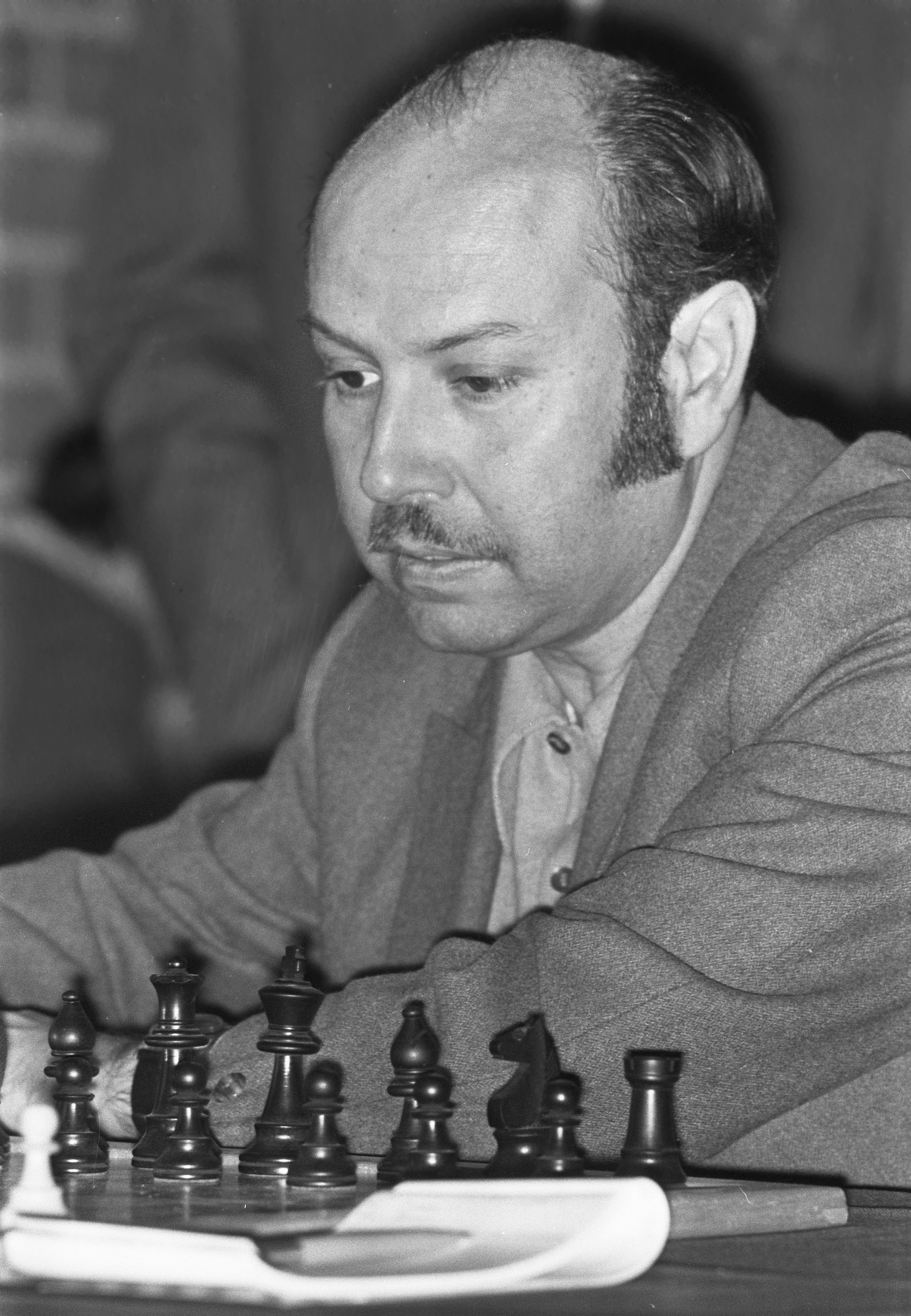
- Pomar in 1972

Personal information
- Born: Arturo Pomar Salamanca; 1 September 1931 Palma de Mallorca, Spain
- Died: 26 May 2016 (aged 84) Barcelona, Spain

Chess career
- Country: Spain
- Title: Grandmaster (1962)
- Peak rating: 2510 (July 1971)
- Peak ranking: No. 63 (July 1971)

Arturo Pomar Salamanca (1 September 1931 – 26 May 2016) was a Spanish chess player. He was the first Spanish player to be awarded the title of grandmaster (GM), and was a seven-time national champion.

== Biography ==
=== The prodigy ===
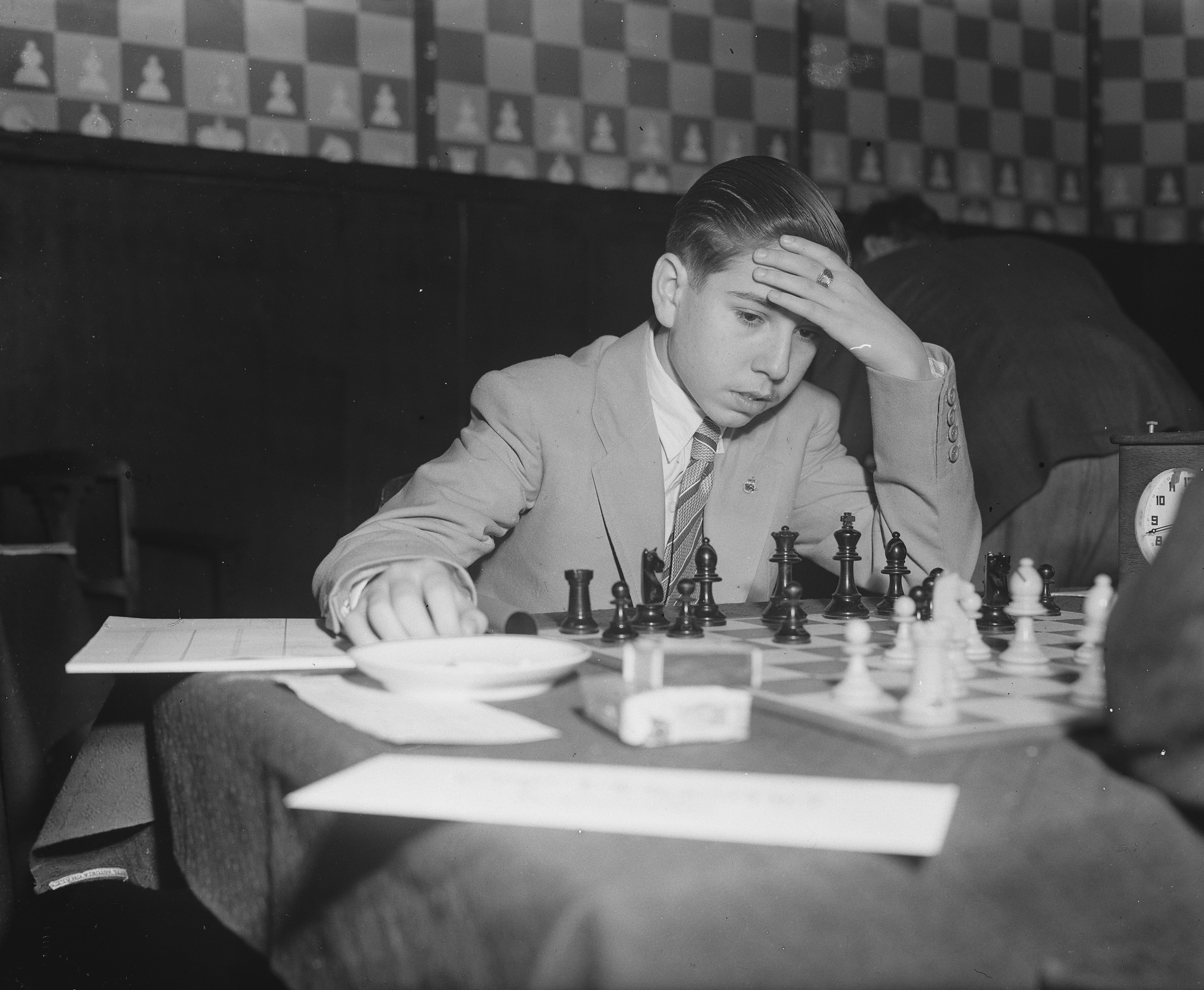
Arturo Pomar (Baarn, 1947)

Pomar was born in Palma de Mallorca and was known in his youth as Arturito. Hailed as a chess prodigy, he was runner-up at the Championship of the Balearic Isles when he was 10 years old, and won the title the following year. World Champion Alexander Alekhine spent time in Spain and Portugal after World War II and took an interest in the young Pomar, even giving him a series of special chess lessons. A part of Alekhine's 1946 book ‘’Legado!’’ was devoted to him.

Pomar played his first international tournament at Madrid in October 1943. Narrowly avoiding last place, he defeated Friedrich Sämisch, who was of grandmaster strength. Then, at just 13 years of age, he was able to draw a game against his esteemed teacher at a tournament in Gijón (1944). The game was an exciting "back and forth" affair, with Pomar outplaying the World Champion in the endgame and reaching a theoretically won position. However, inexact play allowed Alekhine to draw in a game that lasted over 70 moves. Alekhine won the event and Pomar finished fifth.

Pomar's precocity invited comparison with previous prodigies like Paul Morphy, José Raúl Capablanca and Sammy Reshevsky. In his home country, he became quite famous, appearing in radio interviews and on film., but as his career progressed, he never quite fulfilled his early promise.

=== Spain's first grandmaster ===
Pomar's best results in international competition probably occurred at the Madrid Zonal of 1960, where he shared first place with Svetozar Gligorić, Jan Hein Donner and Lajos Portisch; at Torremolinos 1961 (first with Gligoric); Malaga 1964 (first, ahead of Portisch); Palma de Mallorca 1966 (second, after Mikhail Tal, ahead of Portisch); and at Malaga 1971 (first). His success in 1960 qualified him for a place at the Stockholm Interzonal tournament of 1962, where he finished 11th= (Fischer won). This was as close as he got to mounting a challenge for the world title.

He was awarded the International Master title in 1950 and became Spain's first Grandmaster in 1962.

Pomar was Spanish champion seven times (1946, 1950, 1957, 1958, 1959, 1962, and 1966), and Sub-Champion four times (1951, 1956, 1964, and 1969), a record not surpassed until 2010, by Miguel Illescas.

=== A prolific tournament player ===
Close to the end of the war, he tied for fourth/fifth place at Madrid 1945 (Alekhine won); took fourth place at Gijón 1945 (Antonio Rico won); and shared third place at Almería 1945 (F. López Núñez and Alekhine won).

There followed many international appearances. His further results included sixth place at London 1946 (Herman Steiner won) and victory in a short match against Jacques Mieses (1½–½, also held in London). He tied for 12–13th at Barcelona 1946 (Miguel Najdorf won); tied for 15–16th at Mar del Plata 1949 (Héctor Rossetto won); won at Santa Fe 1949; tied for second/third place, behind Paul Michel, at Rosario 1949; shared first at Paris 1949; tied for second/third at Gijón 1950; took 15th at Madrid 1951 (Lodewijk Prins won); took 14th at Bad Pyrmont 1951 (zonal); took 2nd at Hollywood 1952; tied for first/second at New Orleans 1954 (US Open); won at Gijón 1955; tied for second/third at Madrid 1957; won at Santander 1958; shared first with Francisco José Pérez at Madrid 1959.

Pomar finished in fifth place at the Enschede Zonal 1963 (Gligorić won); he took fourth at Málaga 1965 (Antonio Medina won); shared first with Alberic O'Kelly de Galway and Klaus Darga at Palma de Mallorca 1965; took second, behind Mikhail Botvinnik, at Amsterdam 1966 (IBM tournament); tied for 10–12th at Beverwijk 1967 (Boris Spassky won); took eighth at Palma de Mallorca 1968 (Viktor Korchnoi won); took 13th at Palma de Mallorca (Bent Larsen won); won at Málaga 1971, tied for 12–14th at Madrid 1973 (Anatoly Karpov won). He won at Alicante 1975 and ceased playing in serious events around 1985.

=== A team player ===
He played for Spain at twelve consecutive Chess Olympiads, and won the individual bronze medal at Leipzig.

Full results:

- In 1958, at first board in 13th Chess Olympiad in Munich (+5 –4 =8);
- In 1960, at second board in 14th Chess Olympiad in Leipzig (+5 –0 =7);
- In 1962, at first board in 15th Chess Olympiad in Varna (+6 –2 =8);
- In 1964, at first board in 16th Chess Olympiad in Tel Aviv (+5 –2 =9);
- In 1966, at first board in 17th Chess Olympiad in Havana (+5 –4 =7);
- In 1968, at first board in 18th Chess Olympiad in Lugano (+4 –1 =10);
- In 1970, at first board in 19th Chess Olympiad in Siegen (+3 –2 =11);
- In 1972, at first board in 20th Chess Olympiad in Skopje (+5 –5 =7);
- In 1974, at first board in 21st Chess Olympiad in Nice (+3 –6 =8);
- In 1976, at first board in 22nd Chess Olympiad in Haifa (+2 –1 =8);
- In 1978, at second board in 23rd Chess Olympiad in Buenos Aires (+4 –3 =4);
- In 1980, at third board in 24th Chess Olympiad in La Valletta (+2 –2 =6).

=== A career setback ===
Pomar suffered at least two nervous breakdowns while attending tournaments. At Marianske Lazne in 1965, he completed nine of his fifteen games to finish with a share of last place. At Dundee 1967, he withdrew with fewer than half of his games completed, and his score was cancelled. Although he made a good recovery, his later play and results were affected by the experience.

=== Later life ===
In later life, he was many times a guest of honour, especially at the Chess Olympiad of Calvia, held in 2004 on his birth island. In 2016, FIDE recognized his contribution to chess history with a special prize, following a proposal of the ACP

He died in Barcelona, on 26 May 2016, after a long illness.

== Bibliography ==
Pomar wrote several instructional books in Spanish.

- Mis cincuenta partidas con maestros (1945)
- Temas de ajedrez (1956)
- Las pequeñas ventajas en el final (1958)
- Ajedrez (1962)
- El arte de ver la ventaja (1968)
- Ajedrez elemental (with Vasily Panov) (1971)

== Notable chess games ==
- Arturo Pomar vs Efim Geller, Interzonal Tournament, Stockholm 1962, King's Indian Defense: Four Pawns Attack. Exchange Variation (E79), 1-0 Geller is a tactical wizard who gets outplayed in this encounter.
- Alexander Alekhine vs Arturo Pomar, Gijon 1944, Spanish Game: Morphy Defense. Steinitz Deferred (C79), 1/2-1/2 Arturo Pomar drew a game with Alexander Alekhine at the age of thirteen, becoming the youngest player ever to draw with a reigning World Champion at a normal time control. His record still stands.
