= Jesús Díez del Corral =

Spanish chess player

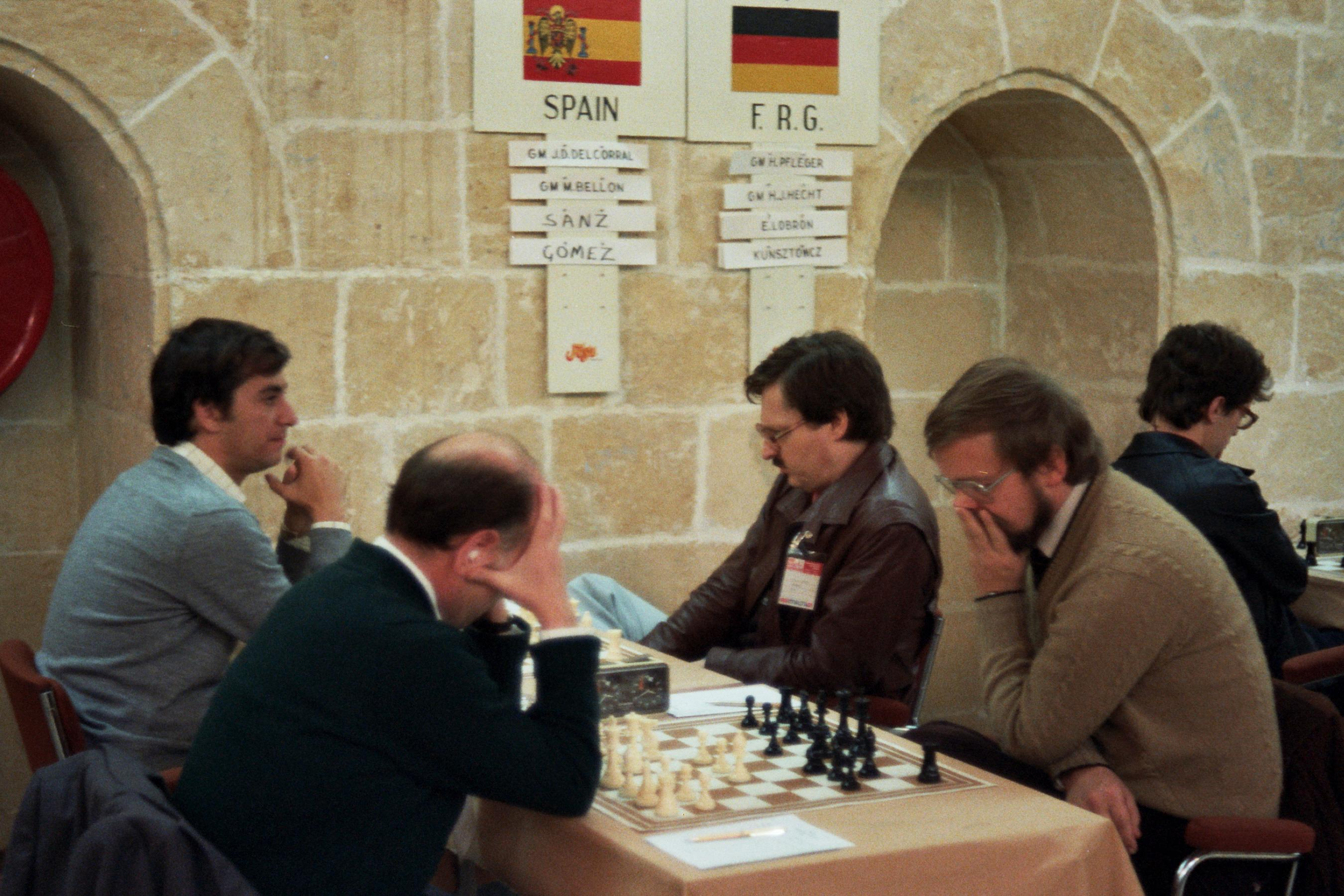

Personal information
- Full name: Jesús María Díez del Corral Rivas
- Born: 6 April 1933 Zaragoza, Spain
- Died: 19 February 2010 (aged 76) Madrid, Spain

Chess career
- Country: Spain
- Title: Grandmaster (1974)
- Peak rating: 2515 (May 1974)
- Peak ranking: No. 63 (January 1975)

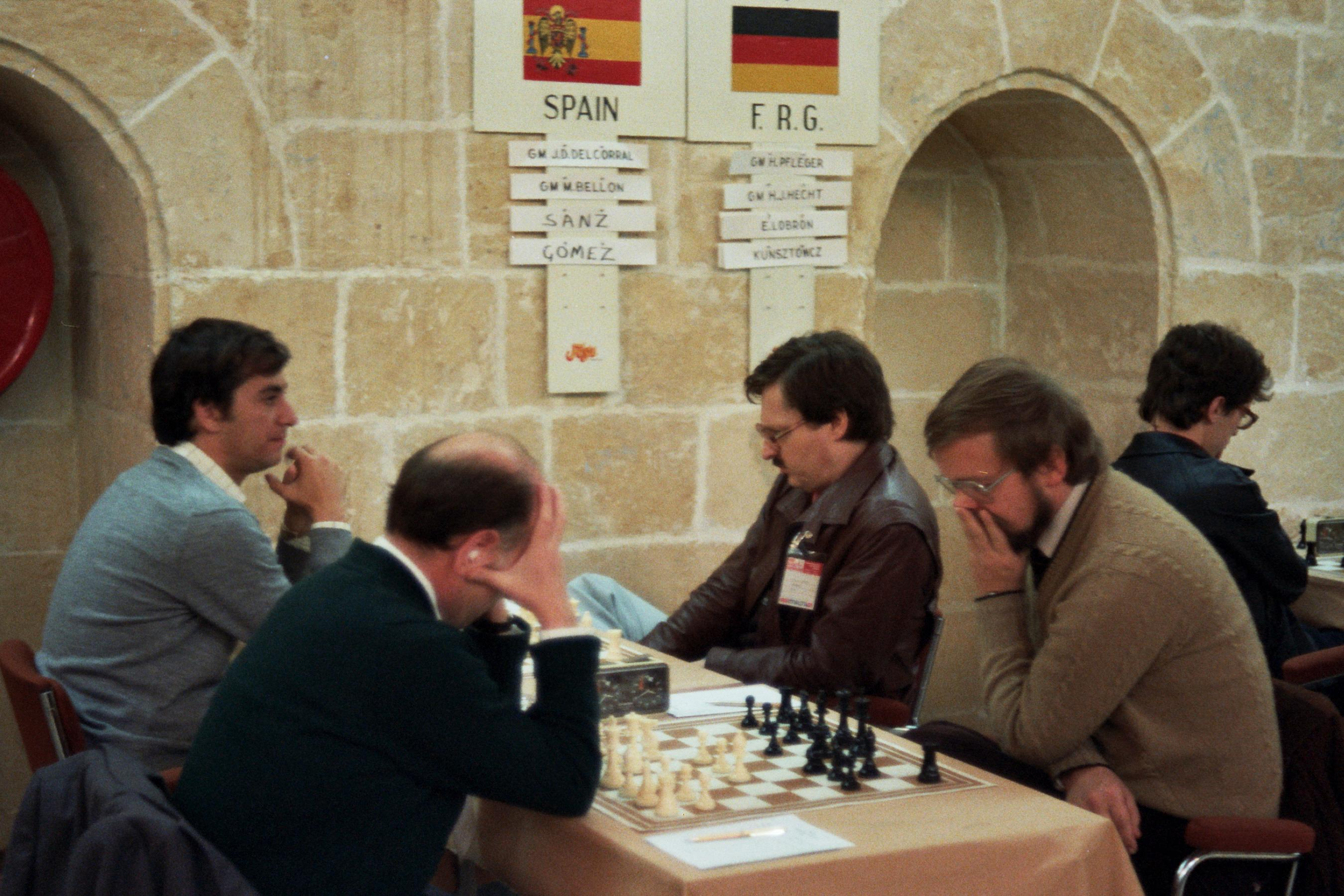
Deutschland M 1980 Malta.jpg

Jesús María Díez del Corral Rivas (6 April 1933, Zaragoza – 19 February 2010, Madrid) was a Spanish chess player who held the FIDE title of Grandmaster.

Díez del Corral was a notary by profession. In 1955 and 1965, he won the Spanish Chess Championship, and throughout the 1960s and 1970s, he was one of Spain's strongest players. He represented Spain at seven Chess Olympiads between 1960 and 1982, playing on top board three times. His best Olympiad result was in Varna in 1962, where he achieved the bronze medal on second board with a score of 10½/16. He was awarded the International Master title in 1968, and in 1974 he became the second Spanish player after Arturo Pomar to achieve the Grandmaster title.

His tournament successes include:

- 2nd at Amsterdam in 1969 (behind Istvan Csom)
- 6th at the very strong Palma de Mallorca tournament in 1969 (behind Bent Larsen and Tigran Petrosian)
- 3rd at L'Hospitalet de Llobregat in 1973 (behind Jan Smejkal)
- 2nd at the Barcelona Zonal tournament, 1975 (behind Gennady Sosonko)

His win over Lajos Portisch at the 1978 Olympiad in Buenos Aires was voted the best game of the second half of 1978 by the Chess Informant. In 1986 he retired from international chess competition, with a rating of 2415, but continued to play club chess until his death in 2010.
