= Pablo San Segundo Carrillo =

Spanish chess grandmaster (born 1970)

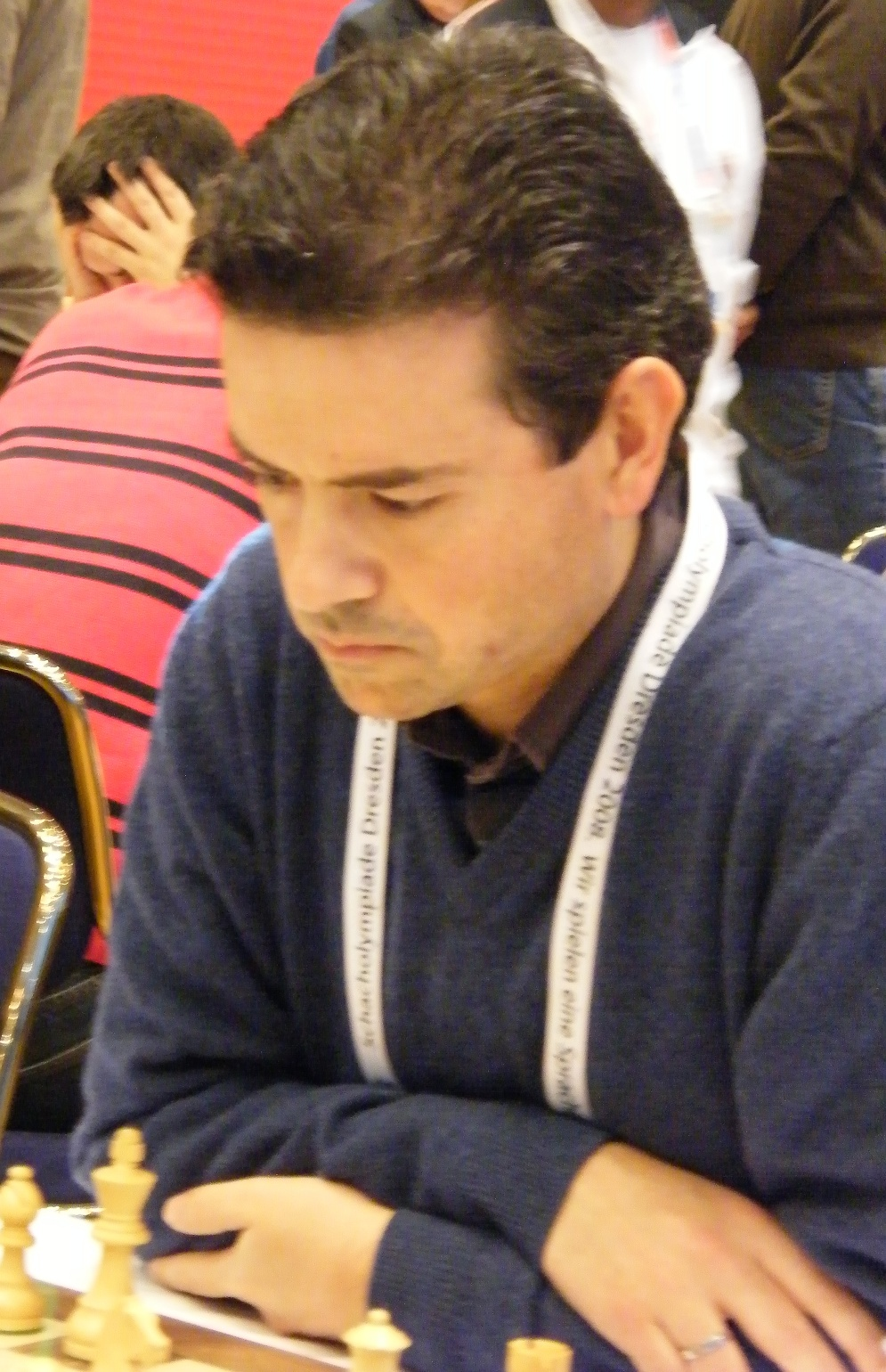
- Pablo San Segundo Carrillo in 2008

Personal information
- Born: 9 February 1970 (age 56) Madrid, Spain

Chess career
- Country: Spain
- Title: Grandmaster (1995)
- FIDE rating: 2491 (July 2026)
- Peak rating: 2570 (July 2009)

Pablo San Segundo Carrillo (born 9 February 1970) is a Spanish chess Grandmaster (GM) (1995), Spanish Chess Championship winner (1997), and a university professor.

== Biography ==
In the 1990s Pablo San Segundo Carrillo was one of the leading Spanish chess players. He has won silver medals twice in Academic World Chess Championships (Antwerp 1992, León 1996). In 1997, in Torrevieja he won Spanish Chess Championship. Pablo San Segundo Carrillo has participated in international chess tournaments many times. In 1995, in Miguel Najdorf memorial (Buenos Aires) he shared 1st place with Loek van Wely. In 2007, in Pamplona Pablo San Segundo Carrillo shared 1st place with Julio Granda and Iván Salgado López.

Pablo San Segundo Carrillo played for Spain in the Chess Olympiads:

- In 1994, at fourth board in the 31st Chess Olympiad in Moscow (+3, =6, -1),
- In 1996, at first reserve board in the 32nd Chess Olympiad in Yerevan (+0, =4, -0),
- In 1998, at first reserve board in the 33rd Chess Olympiad in Elista (+2, =7, -0),
- In 2002, at fourth board in the 35th Chess Olympiad in Bled (+0, =4, -2),
- In 2004, at first board in the 36th Chess Olympiad in Calvià (+1, =9, -1),
- In 2006, at reserve board in the 37th Chess Olympiad in Turin (+3, =4, -1),
- In 2008, at reserve board in the 38th Chess Olympiad in Dresden (+3, =4, -1).

Pablo San Segundo Carrillo played for Spain in the European Team Chess Championships:

- In 1997, at third board in the 11th European Team Chess Championship in Pula (+3, =1, -3),
- In 2001, at fourth board in the 13th European Team Chess Championship in León (+1, =3, -2),
- In 2003, at reserve board in the 14th European Team Chess Championship in Plovdiv (+2, =3, -1),
- In 2005, at second board in the 15th European Team Chess Championship in Gothenburg (+3, =3, -1).

In 1990, he was awarded the FIDE International Master (IM) title and received the FIDE Grandmaster (GM) title five years later.
