= Nieves García Vicente =

Spanish chess player (born 1955)

Personal information
- Born: 23 July 1955 (age 70)

Chess career
- Country: Spain
- Title: Woman International Master (1978)
- Peak rating: 2275 (July 1996)

Nieves García Vicente (born 23 July 1955) is a Spanish chess player who holds the title of Woman International Master (WIM, 1978). She is an eleven time Spanish Women's Chess Champion (1975, 1977, 1978, 1981, 1982, 1984, 1992, 1993, 1996, 1998, 2003).

== Biography ==
From the mid-1970s to the beginning of the 2000s, García Vicente was one of Spanish leading women chess players. In the Spanish Women's Chess Championships she won eleven gold (1975, 1977, 1978, 1981, 1982, 1984, 1992, 1993, 1996, 1998, 2003) and six silver medals (1976, 1986, 1988, 1990, 2000, 2007). In 1979 and 1981, she won twice in International Women's chess tournaments in Biele.

García Vicente twice participated in the Women's World Chess Championship Interzonal Tournaments in 1979 which held in Alicante. She shared the 9th-10th place, but in 1982, in Tbilisi she shared the 4th-6th place with grandmasters Elena Akhmilovskaya and Nino Gurieli.

Nieves García Vicente played for Spain in the Women's Chess Olympiads:

- In 1974, at first reserve board in the 6th Chess Olympiad (women) in Medellín (+2, =3, -2),
- In 1976, at second board in the 7th Chess Olympiad (women) in Haifa (+8, =3, -0) and won the team bronze medal and the individual silver medal,
- In 1978, at first board in the 8th Chess Olympiad (women) in Buenos Aires (+7, =4, -1),
- In 1980, at first board in the 9th Chess Olympiad (women) in Valletta (+5, =4, -4),
- In 1982, at first board in the 10th Chess Olympiad (women) in Lucerne (+5, =7, -1),
- In 1984, at first board in the 26th Chess Olympiad (women) in Thessaloniki (+5, =5, -1),
- In 1986, at first board in the 27th Chess Olympiad (women) in Dubai (+3, =6, -3),
- In 1988, at second board in the 28th Chess Olympiad (women) in Thessaloniki (+5, =6, -2),
- In 1990, at first board in the 29th Chess Olympiad (women) in Novi Sad (+4, =5, -2),
- In 1992, at first board in the 30th Chess Olympiad (women) in Manila (+2, =7, -2),
- In 1994, at first board in the 31st Chess Olympiad (women) in Moscow (+2, =9, -2),
- In 1996, at first board in the 32nd Chess Olympiad (women) in Yerevan (+2, =5, -4),
- In 1998, at first board in the 33rd Chess Olympiad (women) in Elista (+3, =4, -4),
- In 2000, at third board in the 34th Chess Olympiad (women) in Istanbul (+5, =3, -3),
- In 2004, at second board in the 36th Chess Olympiad (women) in Calvià (+1, =6, -4).

Nieves García Vicente played for Spain in the European Team Chess Championships:

- In 1992, at first reserve board in the 1st European Team Chess Championship (women) in Debrecen (+2, =4, -2),
- In 1997, at first reserve board in the 2nd European Team Chess Championship (women) in Pula (+3, =2, -2),
- In 2001, at first board in the 4th European Team Chess Championship (women) in León (+3, =0, -1),
- In 2003, at first board in the 5th European Team Chess Championship (women) in Plovdiv (+3, =1, -1) and won the individual bronze medal.

In 1978, she was awarded the FIDE Woman International Master (WIM) title.
