= David Lariño Nieto =

Spanish chess grandmaster (born 1989)

Personal information
- Born: May 22, 1989 (age 37) Esteiro, Spain

Chess career
- Country: Spain
- Title: Grandmaster (2013)
- FIDE rating: 2402 (July 2026)
- Peak rating: 2521 (May 2013)

David Lariño Nieto is a Spanish chess grandmaster.

== Chess career ==
In October 2008, he won the Spanish Chess Championship after defeating grandmaster Julen Luis Arizmendi Martínez in the tiebreakers.

He achieved the Grandmaster title in 2013, after earning his norms at the:

- IX Torneo Int. de Ajedrez Narciso Yepes in June 2008
- Torneo Magistral Int. de Elgoibar in December 2010
- XXVII Torneo Inter. de Xadrez Ciudade de Ferrol in August 2012

In September 2017, he won a Titled Tuesday tournament alongside Hikaru Nakamura and Georg Meier.
