= Monica Calzetta Ruiz =

Spanish chess player (born 1972)

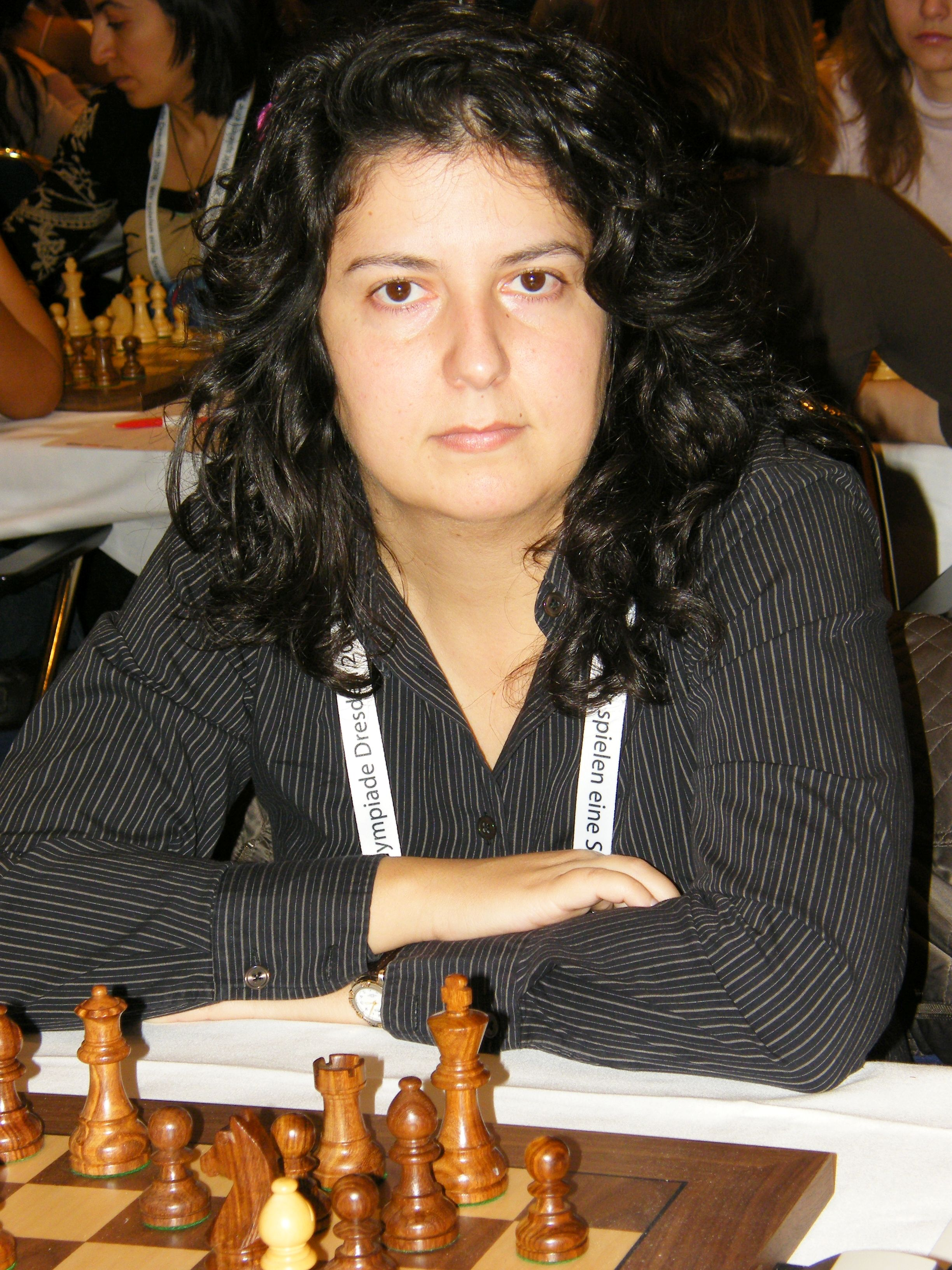
- Calzetta in 2008

Personal information
- Born: 29 November 1972 (age 53) Geneva, Switzerland

Chess career
- Country: Spain
- Title: Woman Grandmaster (2003)
- Peak rating: 2386 (September 2009)

Mónica Calzetta Ruiz (born 29 November 1972) is a Spanish chess player who holds the FIDE title of Woman Grandmaster (WGM, 2003).

== Chess career ==
She was a multiple Spanish Women's Chess championships participant, winning seven gold (1997, 2000, 2002, 2004, 2005, 2007, 2009) and three silver (1996, 1999, 2013) medals.

In 1992 in Antwerp, Calzetta took 4th place in the World Women's Student Chess Championship. In 1995 in Chișinău she participated in the Women's World Chess Championship cycle Interzonal Tournament. Mónica Calzetta Ruiz participated in Women's World Chess Championship 2000 knock-out tournament in New Delhi and lost Corina Peptan in the 1st round. In 2008 taken 4th place in the international chess tournament Chambery Masters and to fulfill her first men's International Master (IM) norm.

Calzetta played for Spain in the Women's Chess Olympiads:

- In 1992, at first reserve board in the 30th Chess Olympiad (women) in Manila (+2, =3, -4),
- In 1994, at first reserve board in the 31st Chess Olympiad (women) in Moscow (+3, =0, -5),
- In 1996, at second board in the 32nd Chess Olympiad (women) in Yerevan (+2, =5, -4),
- In 2000, at first board in the 34th Chess Olympiad (women) in Istanbul (+3, =5, -4),
- In 2002, at first board in the 35th Chess Olympiad (women) in Bled (+4, =2, -5),
- In 2004, at first board in the 36th Chess Olympiad (women) in Calvià (+1, =2, -3),
- In 2006, at first board in the 37th Chess Olympiad (women) in Turin (+4, =2, -4),
- In 2008, at first board in the 38th Chess Olympiad (women) in Dresden (+5, =2, -2),
- In 2010, at second board in the 39th Chess Olympiad (women) in Khanty-Mansiysk (+4, =4, -2),
- In 2012, at fourth board in the 40th Chess Olympiad (women) in Istanbul (+5, =2, -1),
- In 2016, at first board in the 42nd Chess Olympiad (women) in Baku (+4, =3, -1).

Calzetta played for Spain in the European Team Chess Championship:

- In 1997, at first reserve board in the 2nd European Team Chess Championship (women) in Pula (+3, =2, -2),
- In 1999, at second board in the 3rd European Team Chess Championship (women) in Batumi (+3, =3, -1),
- In 2001, at first board in the 4th European Team Chess Championship (women) in León (+2, =1, -4),
- In 2003, at first board in the 5th European Team Chess Championship (women) in Plovdiv (+3, =2, -3),
- In 2005, at first board in the 6th European Team Chess Championship (women) in Gothenburg (+4, =1, -3),
- In 2007, at second board in the 7th European Team Chess Championship (women) in Heraklion (+2, =1, -3),
- In 2009, at first board in the 8th European Team Chess Championship (women) in Novi Sad (+0, =6, -2),
- In 2011, at third board in the 9th European Team Chess Championship (women) in Porto Carras (+2, =5, -0),
- In 2015, at reserve board in the 11th European Team Chess Championship (women) in Reykjavík (+3, =3, -1).

In 1995, Calzetta was awarded the FIDE Woman International Master (WIM) title and in 2003 the Woman Grandmaster (WGM) title.
