= Adhiban Baskaran =

Indian chess grandmaster (born 1992)

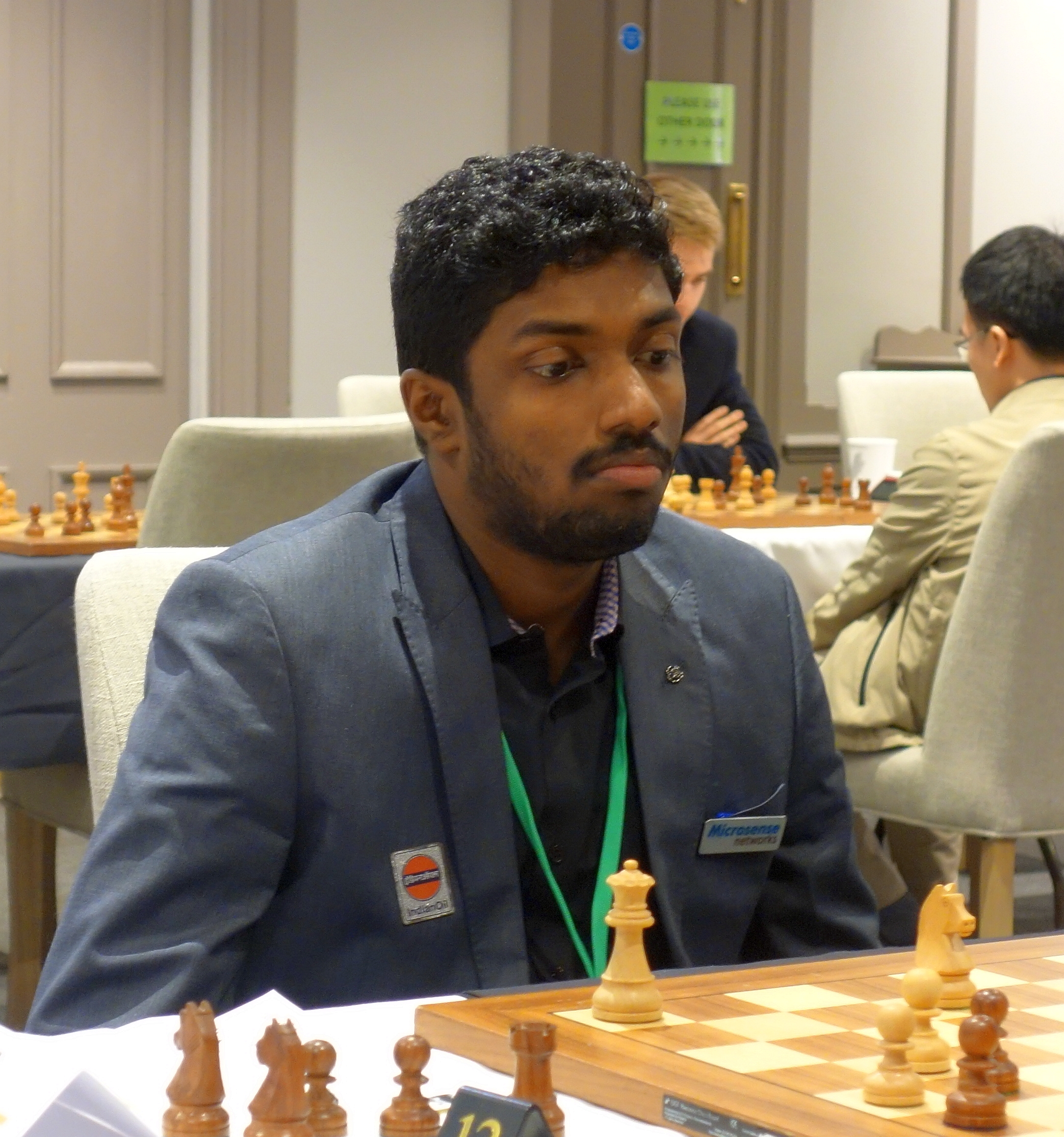
- Adhiban in 2019

Personal information
- Born: 15 August 1992 (age 34) Mayiladuthurai, Tamil Nadu, India

Chess career
- Country: India
- Title: Grandmaster (2010)
- FIDE rating: 2573 (November 2026)
- Peak rating: 2701 (April 2019)
- Peak ranking: No. 38 (April 2019)

Adhiban Baskaran (born 15 August 1992) is an Indian chess grandmaster. He was the 2008 World Under-16 Champion and the 2009 Indian champion. He is currently the 21st highest rated player in India.

== Career ==
In 2007 he won the Asian under-16 championship in Tashkent. Adhiban played on the first board for the gold medal-winning Indian team at the Under-16 Chess Olympiad of 2007 and 2008.

In 2011, he won the Cultural Village tournament in Wijk aan Zee which qualified him for the 2012 Tata Steel C tournament. In this latter event, he tied for 3rd–4th with Daan Brandenburg with a score of 8.5/13. In the Chess World Cup 2013, Adhiban caused an upset in the first two rounds, beating 2710-rated Russian GM Evgeny Alekseev in the first round, and Alexandr Fier in the second one.

Adhiban won the 2013 Sants Open in Barcelona with a score of 8.5 points out of 10. This event included 23 GMs and 28 international masters (IMs).

In July 2014, he won the Masters open tournament of the Biel Chess Festival. In the following month, he contributed to India's bronze medal at the 41st Chess Olympiad in Tromsø scoring 7/11 on board four.

He was also a member of the winning team of the Spanish League 2015, Solvay, along with teammates Pentala Harikrishna, Surya Shekhar Ganguly, Aleksander Delchev, Sergio Cacho Reigadas, Jesus Maria De La Villa Garcia, and Elizbar Ubilava.

Adhiban competed in the Chess World Cup 2015, where he was knocked out by Vladimir Fedoseev in the first round after the rapid tiebreaks.

In January 2016, Adhiban won the 2016 Tata Steel Challengers Tournament in a 3-way tie. The co-leaders were GM Alexei Dreev and GM Eltaj Safarli, all of whom earned 9 points out of 13 (+6-1=6). Because Adhiban defeated them both, he had the better tiebreaks and was therefore awarded the spot in the next Tata Steel Masters tournament.

Despite being the lowest rated player at the 2017 Tata Steel Masters Tournament, he managed to finish third with a score of 7.5 points out of 13 (+4-2=7). He defeated Sergey Karjakin, Dmitry Andreikin, Richárd Rapport, and Radosław Wojtaszek.

Adhiban won the 2018 Reykjavik Open, scoring 7½/9 (+6–0=3). He recorded victories over Alejandro Ramírez, Maxime Lagarde, and Richárd Rapport.

Adhiban also won the 2018 edition of the Tournament of Peace held in Zagreb, Croatia, which was renewed after a 33-year hiatus.

He was also a part of bronze winning Indian team in 2022 Chess Olympiad held in Chennai, India.
