= María del Pino García Padrón =

Spanish chess player

Personal information
- Born: 23 August 1961 (age 64)

Chess career
- Country: Spain
- Peak rating: 2225 (January 1987)

María del Pino García Padrón (born 23 August 1961) is a Spanish chess player. She is a two time Spanish Women's Chess Champion (1980, 1983).

== Biography ==
From the mid-1970s to the mid-1980s, María del Pino García Padrón was one of Spanish leading women chess players. In the Spanish Women's Chess Championships she won two gold (1980, 1983) and four silver medals (1975, 1977, 1982, 1984).

María del Pino García Padrón played for Spain in the Women's Chess Olympiads:

- In 1974, at second board in the 6th Chess Olympiad (women) in Medellín (+5, =4, -0) and won the individual silver medal,
- In 1976, at third board in the 7th Chess Olympiad (women) in Haifa (+3, =4, -3) and won the team bronze medal,
- In 1978, at third board in the 8th Chess Olympiad (women) in Buenos Aires (+6, =4, -3),
- In 1980, at third board in the 9th Chess Olympiad (women) in Valletta (+6, =2, -3),
- In 1982, at second board in the 10th Chess Olympiad (women) in Lucerne (+4, =5, -2).

Since 1987, she has ceased to participate in chess tournaments.
