= Ernesto Palacios de la Prida =

Spanish chess player (1943–2000)

Personal information
- Born: 13 November 1943 Alcalá de Guadaíra, Spain
- Died: May 2000 (aged 56) Alcalá de Guadaíra, Spain

Chess career
- Country: Spain
- Title: FIDE Master (1984)
- Peak rating: 2340 (July 1971)

Ernesto Palacios de la Prida (13 November 1943 – May 2000), was a Spanish chess FIDE Master (FM). He won the Spanish Chess Championship in 1970.

== Biography ==
From the late 1960s to the late 1970s, Ernesto Palacios de la Prida was one of Spain's leading chess players. He has won two medals at the Spanish Chess Championships: gold (1970) and silver (1975). Also Ernesto Palacios de la Prida twice in row won Spanish Junior Chess Championships (1962, 1963) and won silver medal in this tournament in 1961. He was Spanish Schoolchildren Chess Championship winner in 1957. Ernesto Palacios de la Prida six times won Province of Seville Chess Championships. He was participant of a number of international chess tournaments.

Ernesto Palacios de la Prida played for Spain in the Chess Olympiad:

- In 1968, at second reserve board in the 18th Chess Olympiad in Lugano (+1, =1, -2).

Ernesto Palacios de la Prida played for Spain in the European Team Chess Championship preliminaries:

- In 1973, at reserve board in the 5th European Team Chess Championship preliminaries (+1, =2, -1),
- In 1977, at fifth board in the 6th European Team Chess Championship preliminaries (+0, =3, -3).

Ernesto Palacios de la Prida played for Spain in the Clare Benedict Chess Cups:

- In 1971, at reserve board in the 18th Clare Benedict Chess Cup in Madrid (+1, =0, -2) and won team bronze medal.
