= Olga Alexandrova =

Ukrainian-Spanish chess player (born 1978)

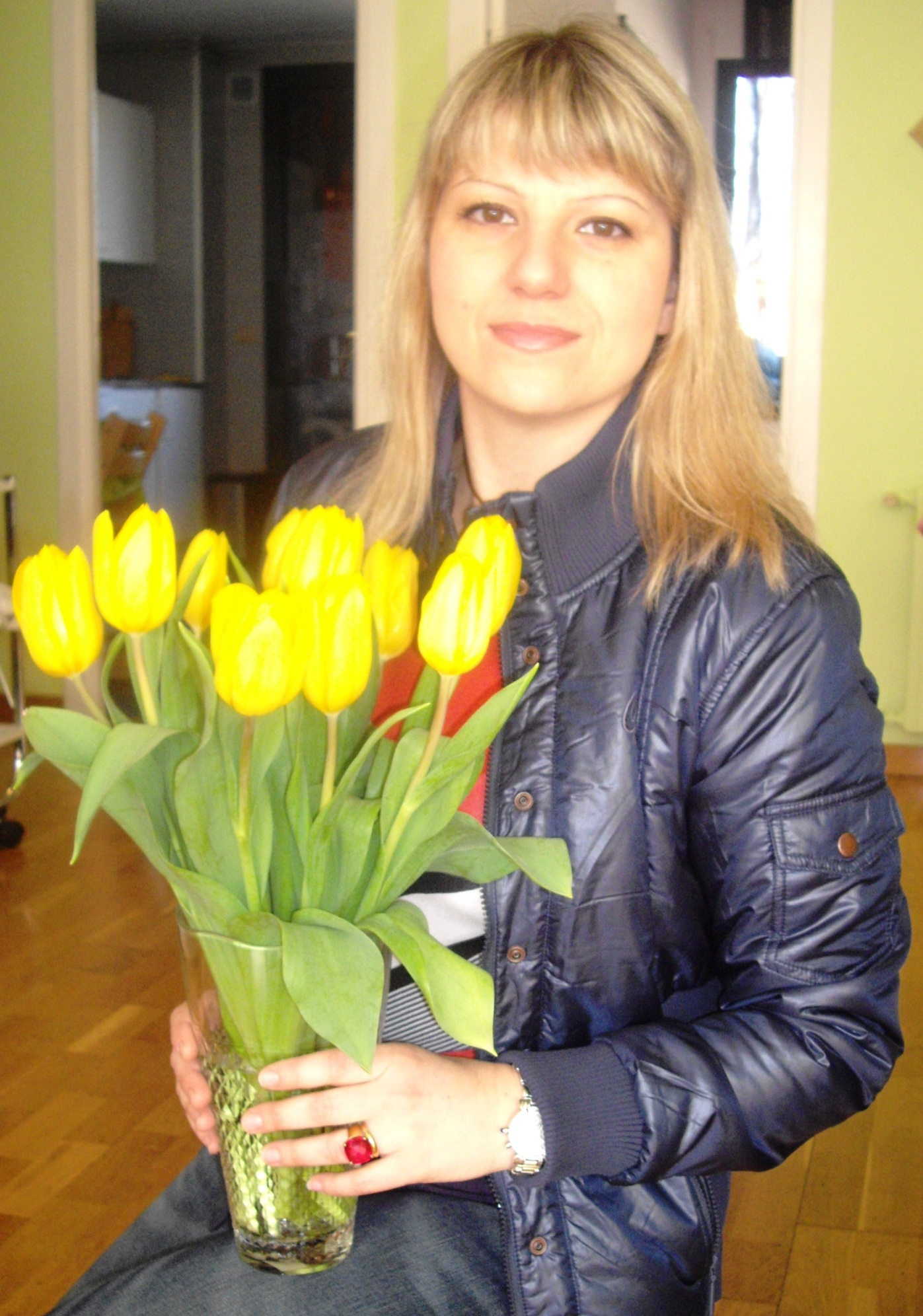
- Alexandrova in 2012

Personal information
- Born: 28 January 1978 (age 48) Kharkiv, Ukrainian SSR, Soviet Union
- Spouse: Miguel Illescas

Chess career
- Country: Ukraine (until 2009); Spain (since 2009)
- Title: International Master (2001); Woman Grandmaster (1999)
- FIDE rating: 2420 (July 2026)
- Peak rating: 2462 (January 2003)

Olga Alexandrova (born 28 January 1978) is a Ukrainian-Spanish chess player who holds the FIDE titles of International Master and Woman Grandmaster.

She is married to Spanish Grandmaster Miguel Illescas. This resulted in an awkward situation in the final round of the 2011 Spanish championship, when the couple found themselves paired against each other with the national title at stake. They agreed a quick draw, allowing Alvar Alonso Rosell to catch Illescas and claim the title on tie-break.

She has won the women's Ukrainian Chess Championship in 2004, and the women's Spanish Chess Championship in 2013.

She has competed twice in the Women's World Chess Championship.
