= Pepita Ferrer Lucas =

Spanish chess player (1938–1993)

Personal information
- Born: 7 May 1938 Barcelona, Spain
- Died: 14 January 1993 (aged 54)

Chess career
- Country: Spain
- Title: Woman International Master (1974)
- Peak rating: 2125 (January 1988)

Pepita Ferrer Lucas (7 May 1938 – 14 January 1993) was a Catalan chess player who holds the title of Woman International Master (WIM, 1974). She was an eight-time Spanish Women's Chess Champion (1961, 1963, 1969, 1971, 1972, 1973, 1974, 1976).

== Biography ==
From mid-1950s to mid 1980s, Ferrer Lucas was one of Spanish leading women chess players. In the Spanish Women's Chess Championships she won eight gold (1961, 1963, 1969, 1971, 1972, 1973, 1974, 1976) and two silver medals (1957, 1959). Also she four times won the Catalonia Women's Chess Championships (1956, 1958, 1959, 1981).

Ferrer Lucas twice participated in the Women's World Chess Championship Interzonal Tournaments: in 1973, Menorca she ranked at 14th place, but in 1986, in Zeleznovodsk she stayed at 16th place.

Pepita Ferrer Lucas played for Spain in the Women's Chess Olympiads:

- In 1974, at first board in the 6th Chess Olympiad (women) in Medellín (+6, =2, -2),
- In 1976, at first board in the 7th Chess Olympiad (women) in Haifa (+3, =5, -3) and won the team bronze medal,
- In 1978, at second board in the 8th Chess Olympiad (women) in Buenos Aires (+4, =4, -4),
- In 1980, at second board in the 9th Chess Olympiad (women) in Valletta (+3, =4, -4),
- In 1982, at first reserve board in the 10th Chess Olympiad (women) in Lucerne (+4, =0, -4),
- In 1984, at third board in the 26th Chess Olympiad (women) in Thessaloniki (+5, =3, -4),
- In 1986, at first reserve board in the 27th Chess Olympiad (women) in Dubai (+3, =2, -2).

In 1974, she was awarded the FIDE Woman International Master (WIM) title. Ferrer Lucas was the first Spanish chess player to receive this title.
