= Francisco Javier Sanz Alonso =

Spanish chess player (1952–2022)

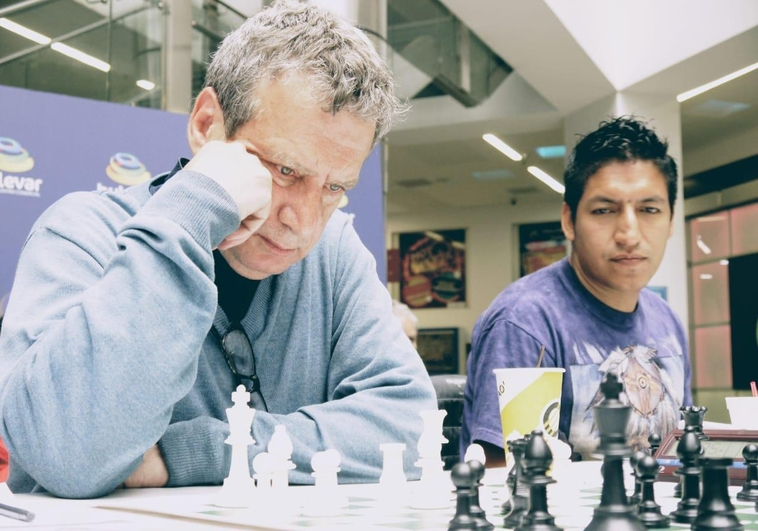

Personal information
- Born: 13 December 1952 Salamanca, Spain
- Died: 11 November 2022 (aged 69) Salamanca, Spain

Chess career
- Country: Spain
- Title: International Master (IM) (1978)

Francisco Javier Sanz Alonso (13 December 1952 – 11 November 2022) was a Spanish chess International Master (IM) (1978), Spanish Chess Championship winner (1973).

== Biography ==
In the 1970s and 1980s, Francisco Javier Sanz Alonso was one of the top Spanish chess players. In 1971, he was second in Spanish Junior Chess Championship. In 1973, he won Spanish Chess Championship, but in 1980 and 1982 he twice won silver medal in this tournament. Francisco Javier Sanz Alonso has participated in international chess tournaments many times and in 1978 in Benidorm won tournament Abierto Internacional de Benidorm. Francisco Javier Sanz Alonso two times won Spanish Team Chess Championships (1974, 1981). Also he won the Salamanca Chess Championship five times: 1969, 1970, 1971, 1972 and 1973.

Francisco Javier Sanz Alonso played for Spain in the Chess Olympiads:

- In 1974, at second reserve board in the 21st Chess Olympiad in Nice (+3, =1, -5),
- In 1976, at first reserve board in the 22nd Chess Olympiad in Haifa (+2, =1, -1),
- In 1978, at first reserve board in the 23rd Chess Olympiad in Buenos Aires (+3, =1, -2),
- In 1980, at first reserve board in the 24th Chess Olympiad in La Valletta (+1, =2, -2),
- In 1982, at first reserve board in the 25th Chess Olympiad in Lucerne (+3, =3, -2).

Francisco Javier Sanz Alonso played for Spain in the European Team Chess Championship preliminaries:

- In 1977, at fourth board in the 6th European Team Chess Championship preliminaries (+1, =2, -2).

Francisco Javier Sanz Alonso played for Spain in the Clare Benedict Chess Cups:

- In 1974, at reserve board in the 21st Clare Benedict Chess Cup in Cala Galdana (+1, =2, -2),
- In 1977, at fourth board in the 22nd Clare Benedict Chess Cup in Copenhagen (+0, =4, -2).

In 1978, he was awarded the FIDE International Master (IM) title.
