= Gabriel del Río =

Spanish chess grandmaster (born 1976)

- Del Río in 2012

Personal information
- Born: Salvador Gabriel del Río de Angelis; 2 October 1976 (age 50) Argentina

Chess career
- Country: Spain
- Title: Grandmaster (2002)
- FIDE rating: 2424 (November 2026)
- Peak rating: 2560 (July 2009)

Salvador Gabriel del Río de Angelis (born 2 October 1976) is a Spanish chess grandmaster. He won the Spanish Chess Championship in 2018.

== Chess career ==
Del Río was born in 1976 in Argentina. He earned his international master title in 1997 and his grandmaster title in 2002. He is the No. 19 ranked Spanish player as of July 2021. He won the Spanish Chess Championship in 2018.
