= María Luisa Cuevas Rodríguez =

Spanish chess player (born 1965)

Personal information
- Born: 8 March 1965 (age 61)

Chess career
- Country: Spain
- Title: Woman International Master (1988)
- Peak rating: 2255 (January 1995)

María Luisa Cuevas Rodríguez (born 8 March 1965) is a Spanish chess player who holds the FIDE title of Woman International Master (WIM, 1988). She is a seven time Spanish Women's Chess Champion (1985, 1986, 1987, 1988, 1989, 1991, 1994).

== Biography ==
From the end of 1970s to the end of the 1990s, Cuevas was one of Spanish leading women chess players. In the Spanish Women's Chess Championships she won seven gold (1985, 1986, 1987, 1988, 1989, 1991, 1994) and four silver medals (1978, 1979, 1983, 1997). One of her greatest international successes was winning silver medal of Academic World Chess Championship in 1992 in Antwerp.

Cuevas participated three times in the Women's World Chess Championship European Zonal Tournaments:

- in 1985 in Albacete at South European subzonal 1C she shared 1st–4th place;
- in 1987 in Porto at West European subzonal 1C she shared 3rd–4th place;
- in 1995 in Chambéry at Zonal 1.1 (West Europe) she ranked in 7th place.

Cuevas played for Spain in the Women's Chess Olympiads:

- In 1978, at first reserve board in the 8th Chess Olympiad (women) in Buenos Aires (+1, =2, -2),
- In 1980, at first reserve board in the 9th Chess Olympiad (women) in Valletta (+3, =1, -3),
- In 1984, at second board in the 26th Chess Olympiad (women) in Thessaloniki (+4, =4, -4),
- In 1986, at second board in the 27th Chess Olympiad (women) in Dubai (+5, =4, -3),
- In 1988, at first board in the 28th Chess Olympiad (women) in Thessaloniki (+5, =0, -7),
- In 1990, at second board in the 29th Chess Olympiad (women) in Novi Sad (+6, =3, -4),
- In 1992, at second board in the 30th Chess Olympiad (women) in Manila (+6, =1, -4),
- In 1994, at second board in the 31st Chess Olympiad (women) in Moscow (+5, =4, -4),
- In 1996, at third board in the 32nd Chess Olympiad (women) in Yerevan (+3, =7, -1).

Cuevas played for Spain in the European Team Chess Championships:

- In 1992, at second board in the 1st European Team Chess Championship (women) in Debrecen (+4, =2, -1) and won the individual bronze medal,
- In 1997, at second board in the 2nd European Team Chess Championship (women) in Pula (+1, =0, -3).

In 1988, Cuevas was awarded the FIDE Woman International Master (WIM) title. Since 1999, she has not participated in tournaments classified by FIDE.
