= Sabrina Vega (chess player) =

Spanish chess player (born 1987)

Sabrina Vega Gutiérrez
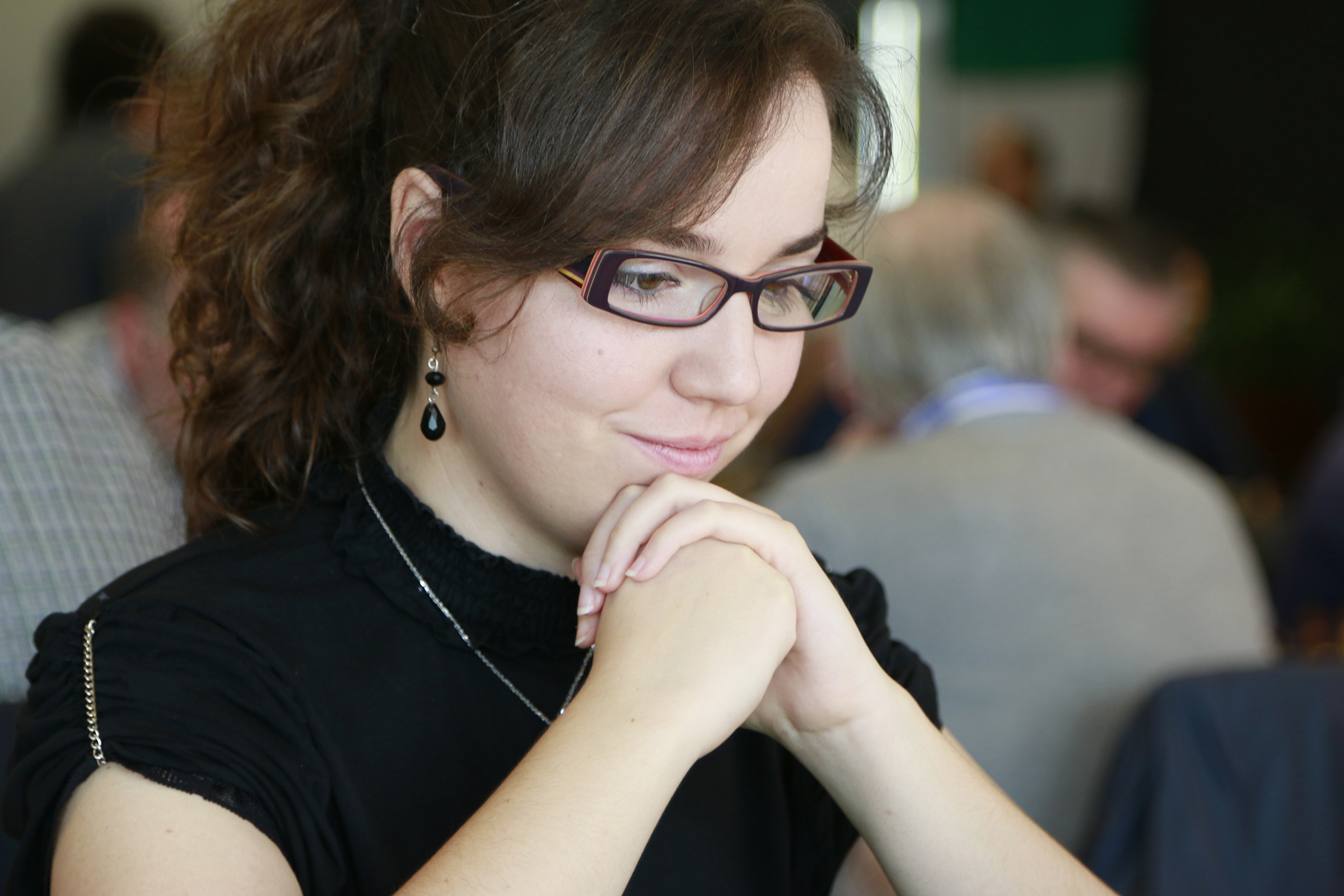
- Sabrina Vega Gutiérrez in 2015

Personal information
- Born: 28 February 1987 (age 39) Las Palmas, Spain

Chess career
- Country: Spain
- Title: International Master (2013); Woman Grandmaster (2007)
- FIDE rating: 2401 (July 2026)
- Peak rating: 2427 (June 2017)

Sabrina Vega Gutiérrez (born 28 February 1987 in Las Palmas) is a Spanish chess player who holds the FIDE titles of International Master (IM) and Woman Grandmaster (WGM).

== Chess career ==
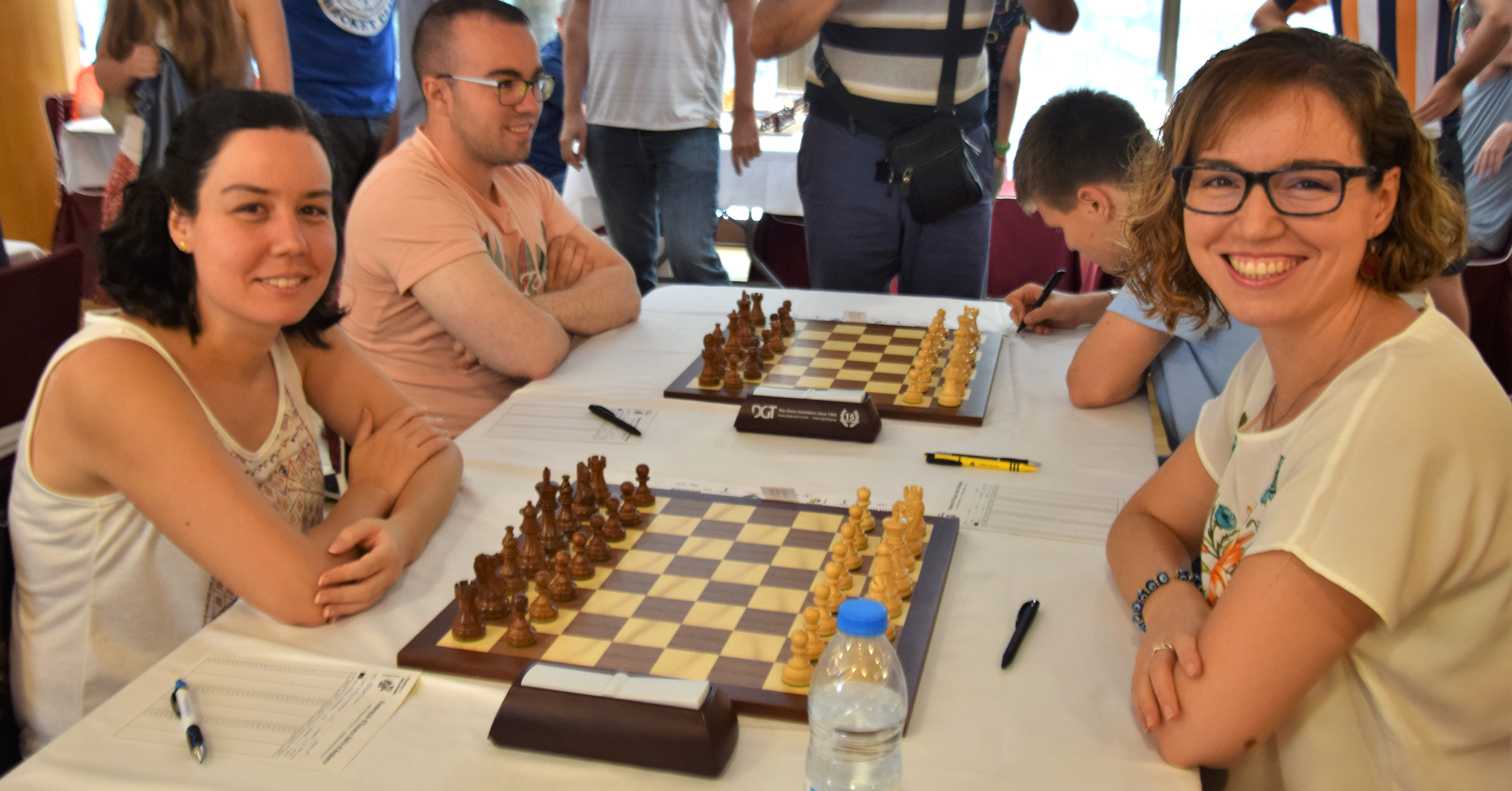
Sisters Belinda (left) and Sabrina Vega play at the 2019 Andorra open

From 1996 to 2007, Vega participated in European Youth Chess Championships and World Youth Chess Championships in different age categories. She fulfilled a Women's Grandmaster norm in Mondariz (2005/06), Lorce (2007) and La Massana (2007). Vega twice in a row won Belgrad chess tournaments (2013, 2014).

Vega has played for Spain in ten Chess Olympiads (2004, 2008–2018, 2022-2024). She won individual silver medal in 2024. Vega has played for Spain in six European Team Chess Championships (2005-2015).

She has been nine times Spanish Women's Champion winning the title in 2008, 2012, 2015, 2017, 2018, 2019, 2020, 2021 and 2024. In 2016, in Mamaia, Vega won silver medal in European Individual Women Chess Championship.

Her elder sister, Belinda Vega Gutierrez, started playing chess some years after her, and is a Woman International Master.
