= Alfonso Romero Holmes =

Spanish chess grandmaster (born 1965)

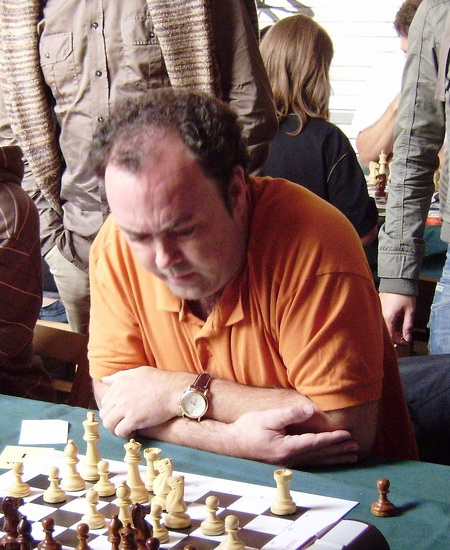
- Alfonso Romero Holmes in 2008

Personal information
- Born: 28 May 1965 (age 61) Barcelona, Spain

Chess career
- Country: Spain
- Title: Grandmaster (1995)
- FIDE rating: 2427 (July 2026)
- Peak rating: 2560 (April 2003)

Alfonso Romero Holmes (born 28 May 1965) is a Spanish chess Grandmaster (GM) (1995), Spanish Chess Championship winner (1987), Chess Olympiad individual bronze medal winner (2002).

== Career ==
Between 1990s and 2000s, Holmes was one of the leading Spanish chess players. In 1984/1985, in Groningen he won silver medal in European Junior Chess Championship.

In 1987, in Salou he won Spanish Chess Championship. Other chess tournament successes of Alfonso Romero Holmes include: shared 1st place in Albacete (1989), twice shared 1st place in Salamanca (1990, 2005), won in Wijk aan Zee (1991, tournament B), twice won in Valencia (2001, 2003).

Alfonso Romero Holmes played for Spain in the Chess Olympiads:

- In 1986, at second reserve board in the 27th Chess Olympiad in Dubai (+5, =2, -3),
- In 1990, at third board in the 29th Chess Olympiad in Novi Sad (+5, =3, -2),
- In 1992, at second board in the 30th Chess Olympiad in Manila (+2, =4, -3),
- In 2002, at third board in the 35th Chess Olympiad in Bled (+7, =1, -2) and won individual bronze medal,
- In 2004, at first reserve board in the 36th Chess Olympiad in Calvià (+2, =3, -2).
- Alfonso Romero Holmes played for Spain in the European Team Chess Championship:
- In 2003, at reserve board in the 14th European Team Chess Championship in Plovdiv (+0, =0, -3).
- In 1985, he was awarded the FIDE International Master (IM) title and received the FIDE Grandmaster (GM) title ten years later.
