= Spanish Chess Championship =

National chess championship in Spain

The Spanish Chess Championship is contested annually under the auspices of the Federación Española de Ajedrez (FEDA), the governing body of chess in Spain, to determine the nation's chess champion. The first official championship was in 1928.

== Winners ==
Year	City (Men)	Champion	City (Women)	Women's Champion
1902	Madrid	Manuel Golmayo Torriente		
1912	Madrid	Manuel Golmayo Torriente		
1921	Madrid	Manuel Golmayo Torriente		
1927	honorary	Manuel Golmayo Torriente		
1928	Madrid	Manuel Golmayo Torriente		
1929	Barcelona	Ramón Rey Ardid		
1930	Barcelona	Ramón Rey Ardid		
1932	Valencia	Ramón Rey Ardid		
1933	Valencia	Ramón Rey Ardid		
1935	Zaragoza	Ramón Rey Ardid		
1942	Barcelona	Ramón Rey Ardid		
1943	Madrid	José Sanz Aguado		
1944	Madrid	Antonio Medina		
1945	Bilbao	Antonio Medina		
1946	Santander	Arturo Pomar		
1947	Valencia	Antonio Medina		
1948	Murcia	Francisco José Pérez Pérez		
1949	Albacete	Antonio Medina		
1950	San Sebastián	Arturo Pomar	Madrid	Gloria Velat
1951	Barcelona	Román Torán Albero	Valencia	Sofía Ruiz
1952	Gijón	Antonio Medina		
1953	Galicia	Román Torán Albero	Barcelona	Pilar Cifuentes
1954	Tarragona	Francisco José Pérez Pérez		
1955	Alcoy	Jesús Díez del Corral	Valencia	Pilar Cifuentes
1956	Barcelona	Jaime Lladó Lumbera		
1957	Zaragoza	Arturo Pomar	Madrid	Mª Luisa Gutierrez
1958	Valencia	Arturo Pomar		
1959	Tenerife	Arturo Pomar	Barcelona	Mª Luisa Gutierrez
1960	Lugo	Francisco José Pérez Pérez		
1961	Granada	Jaime Lladó Lumbera	Barcelona	Pepita Ferrer
1962	Málaga	Arturo Pomar		
1963	Cádiz	Antonio Medina	Madrid	Pepita Ferrer
1964	Las Palmas	Antonio Medina		
1965	Sevilla	Jesús Díez del Corral	Arenys de Mar	Mª Luisa Gutierrez
1966	Almería	Arturo Pomar		
1967	Palma de Mallorca	Ángel Fernández García	Arenys de Mar	Mª Luisa Gutierrez
1968	Reus	Fernando Visier Segovia		
1969	Navalmoral	Juan Manuel Bellón López	Santander	Pepita Ferrer
1970	Avilés	Ernesto Palacios de la Prida		
1971	Gijón	Juan Manuel Bellón López	Candás	Pepita Ferrer
1972	Salamanca	Fernando Visier Segovia	Vigo	Pepita Ferrer
1973	Tenerife	Francisco Javier Sanz Alonso	Gijón	Pepita Ferrer
1974	Valencia	Juan Manuel Bellón López	Zaragoza	Pepita Ferrer
1975	Benidorm	José Miguel Fraguela Gil	Sevilla	Nieves García
1976	Ceuta	Ángel Martín González	Alicante	Pepita Ferrer
1977	Santa Margarita	Juan Manuel Bellón López	Zamora	Nieves García
1978	O Grove	Manuel Rivas Pastor	O Grove	Nieves García
1979	Torrevieja	Manuel Rivas Pastor	Vic	Julia Gallego
1980	Lleida	Juan Mario Gómez	Reus	Mª Pino García Padrón
1981	Sevilla	Manuel Rivas Pastor	Nerja	Nieves García
1982	Cartagena	Juan Manuel Bellón López	Córdoba	Nieves García
1983	Las Palmas	José García Padrón	Lleida	Mª Pino García Padrón
1984	Barcelona	Ángel Martín González	La Roda	Nieves García
1985	Huesca	Jesús María de la Villa	Logroño	María Luisa Cuevas Rodríguez
1986	La Roda	Ángel Martín González	Benidorm	María Luisa Cuevas Rodríguez
1987	Salou	Alfonso Romero Holmes	Bilbao	María Luisa Cuevas Rodríguez
1988	Alcanar	Jesús de la Villa García	Coria del Río	María Luisa Cuevas Rodríguez
1989	Almería	José Luis Fernández García	Alicante	María Luisa Cuevas Rodríguez
1990	Linares	Jordi Magem Badals	Benasque	Beatriz Alfonso
1991	Lleida	Manuel Rivas Pastor	Llanes	María Luisa Cuevas Rodríguez
1992	Madrid	Mario Gómez Esteban	San Fernando	Nieves García
1993	Linares-Bilbao	Lluis Comas Fabregó	Valencia	Nieves García
1994	Cañete	Sergio Cacho Reigadas	Sant Feliu de Guixols	María Luisa Cuevas Rodríguez
1995	Matalascañas	Miguel Illescas	Vitoria-Gasteiz	Mónica Vilar
1996	Zamora	Sergio Estremera Paños	Vitoria-Gasteiz	Nieves García
1997	Torrevieja	Pablo San Segundo Carrillo	Castelló d'Empúries	Mónica Calzetta
1998	Linares	Miguel Illescas	Vera	Nieves García
1999	Palencia	Miguel Illescas	Vera	Silvia Timón
2000	Manresa	Ángel Martín González	La Roda	Mónica Calzetta
2001	Manacor	Miguel Illescas	Vera	Yudania Hernández
2002	Ayamonte	Alexei Shirov	Ayamonte	Mónica Calzetta
2003	Burgos	Oscar de la Riva Aguado	Burgos	Nieves García
2004	Sevilla	Miguel Illescas	Sevilla	Mónica Calzetta
2005	Lorca	Miguel Illescas	Lorca	Mónica Calzetta
2006	León	Francisco Vallejo Pons	Salou	Patricia Llaneza
2007	Ayamonte	Miguel Illescas	Socuéllamos	Mónica Calzetta
2008	Ceuta	David Lariño	Novetlè	Sabrina Vega
2009	Palma de Mallorca	Francisco Vallejo Pons	Almansa	Mónica Calzetta
2010	Tenerife	Miguel Illescas	Huelva	Lucia Pascual Palomo
2011	Arenal d'en Castell	Alvar Alonso Rosell	Padron	Yudania Hernández
2012	Gran Canaria	Julen Luis Arizmendi Martínez	Salobrena	Sabrina Vega
2013	Linares	Iván Salgado López	Linares	Olga Alexandrova
2014	Linares	Francisco Vallejo	Linares	Olga Alexandrova
2015	Linares	Francisco Vallejo	Linares	Sabrina Vega
2016	Linares	Francisco Vallejo	Linares	Ana Matnadze
2017	Las Palmas	Ivan Salgado Lopez	Linares	Sabrina Vega
2018	Linares	Gabriel del Río	Linares	Sabrina Vega
2019	Marbella	Alexei Shirov	Marbella	Sabrina Vega
2020	Linares	David Antón Guijarro	Linares	Sabrina Vega
2021	Linares	Eduardo Iturrizaga	Linares	Sabrina Vega
2022	Linares	Eduardo Iturrizaga	Linares	Marta García Martín
2023	Marbella	Eduardo Iturrizaga	Marbella	Sarasadat Khademalsharieh
2024	Marbella	Daniil Yuffa	Marbella	Sabrina Vega
2025	Marbella	David Antón Guijarro	Marbella	Marta García Martín
2026	Linares	Alan Pichot	Linares	Marta García Martín

== See also ==
- Chess in Spain

== Drug testing ==
In 2015, a Grandmaster with joint residence in Ukraine tested positive for Carpheon.
