= Marta García Martín =

Spanish chess player (born 2000)

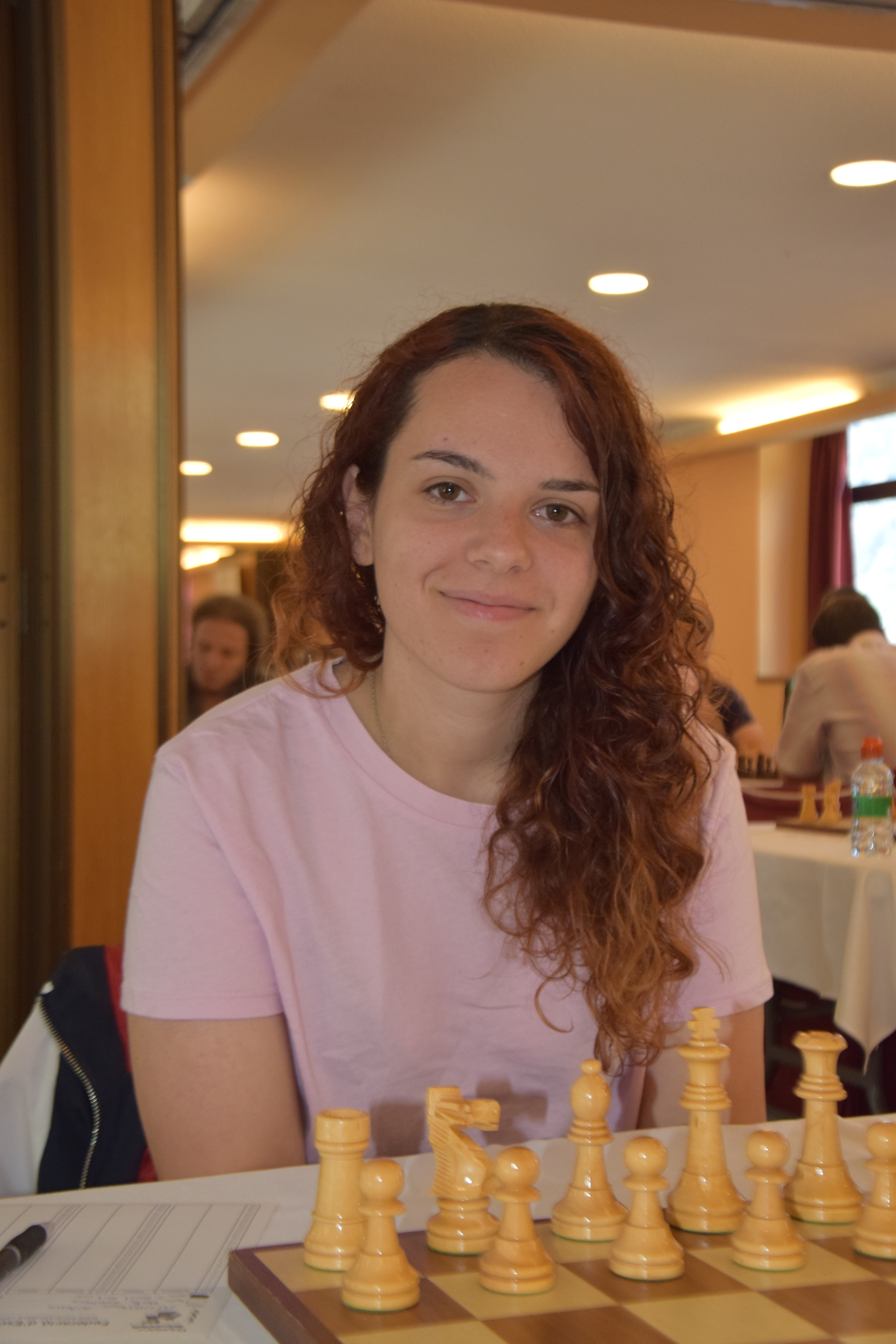
- Garcia at the 2019 Andorra open

Personal information
- Born: 13 July 2000 (age 26) El Prat de Llobregat, Spain

Chess career
- Country: Spain
- Title: International Master (2019); Woman Grandmaster (2018)
- Peak rating: 2435 (May 2017)

Marta García Martín (born 13 July 2000) is a Spanish chess player, who achieved the FIDE International Master qualification in 2019. She currently belongs to the C.A. Mislata Lanjarón Discema team from Mislata, Valencia. Garcia won the Spanish Women's Chess Championship in 2022, 2025 and 2026. She was the No. 3 ranked Spanish female player as of June 2023.
