= Román Torán Albero =

Spanish chess player (1931–2005)

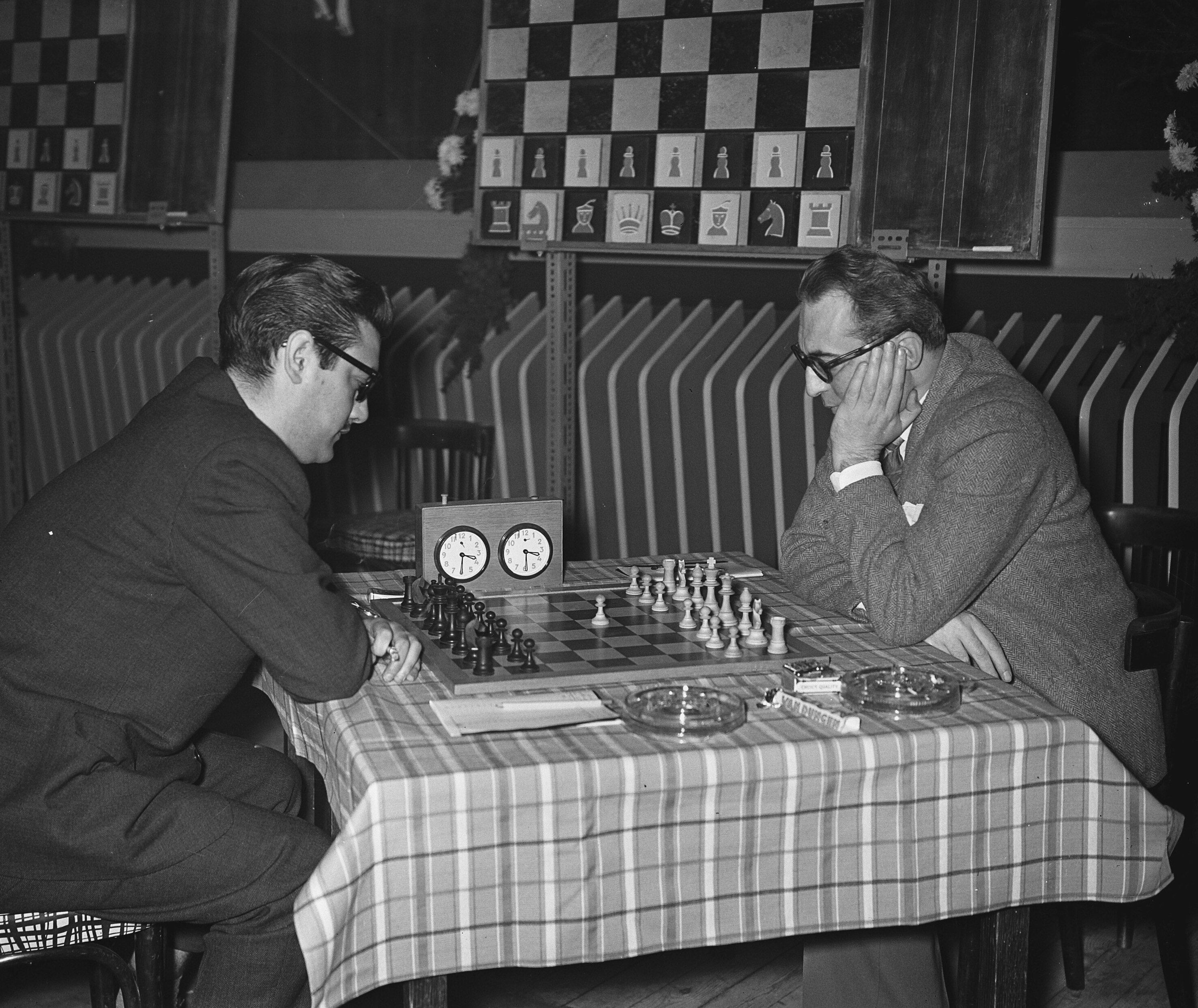
- Torán Albero in 1956

Personal information
- Born: 8 October 1931 Gijón, Spain
- Died: 1 October 2005 (aged 73) Madrid, Spain

Chess career
- Country: Spain
- Title: International Master (1954)
- Peak rating: 2445 (January 1975)

Román Torán Albero (8 October 1931 — 1 October 2005) was a Spanish chess player. He received the FIDE titles of International Master (IM) in 1954 and International Arbiter in 1957. He was FIDE Vice President (1982–1990) and a two-time Spanish Chess Championship winner (1951, 1953).

== Biography ==
In the early 1950s, Román Torán Albero was among the best Spanish players. In 1951 and 1953, he won the Spanish Chess Championship, but in 1954 in the final tournament, he ranked second place. Román Torán Albero repeatedly took part in The Gijon International Chess Tournament, 1946, 1947, 1948, 1949, 1950, 1951, and won in 1954. Two times he participated in FIDE Zonal Chess tournaments (1954, 1962).

Román Torán Albero played for Spain in the Chess Olympiads:

- In 1958, at third board in the 13th Chess Olympiad in Munich (+4, =7, -4),
- In 1960, at third board in the 14th Chess Olympiad in Leipzig (+5, =7, -2),
- In 1968, at third board in the 18th Chess Olympiad in Lugano (+6, =8, -1),
- In 1970, at third board in the 19th Chess Olympiad in Siegen (+6, =4, -2),
- In 1972, at fourth board in the 20th Chess Olympiad in Skopje (+4, =8, -3),
- In 1974, at second board in the 21st Chess Olympiad in Nice (+6, =8, -1).

Román Torán Albero played for Spain in the European Team Chess Championships:

- In 1961, at second board in the 2nd European Team Chess Championship in Oberhausen (+0, =2, -7),
- In 1970, at fourth board in the 4th European Team Chess Championship in Kapfenberg (+0, =4, -1).

Román Torán Albero played for Spain in the World Student Team Chess Championship:

- In 1956, at first board in the 3rd World Student Team Chess Championship in Uppsala (+1, =7, -1).

Also Román Torán Albero nine times participated in Clare Benedict Chess Cup (1958–1959, 1965, 1967–1972) and in team competition won gold (1970), four silver (1958, 1959, 1965, 1967) and three bronze (1969, 1971, 1972) medals, and in individual competition won two gold (1968, 1972) medals.

In the mid-1970s, Román Torán Albero ended his active chess player career and devoted himself to journalistic work and chess activist. From 1982 to 1997 he was the FIDE Vice President for Europe, between 1988 and 2000 Román Torán Albero was the president of the Spanish Chess Federation. He published dozens of books on chess, was the founder of the periodicals Ajedrez Español, Ocho por ocho, led the chess sections in magazines Arriba y Pueblo and Marca. In 1992 he was awarded the title of honorary member of FIDE.

== Literature ==
Román Torán Albero. El genio del ajedrez moderno, Madrid, 1953 ("The genius of modern chess", about grandmaster David Bronstein).
