= Iván Salgado López =

Spanish chess grandmaster (born 1991)

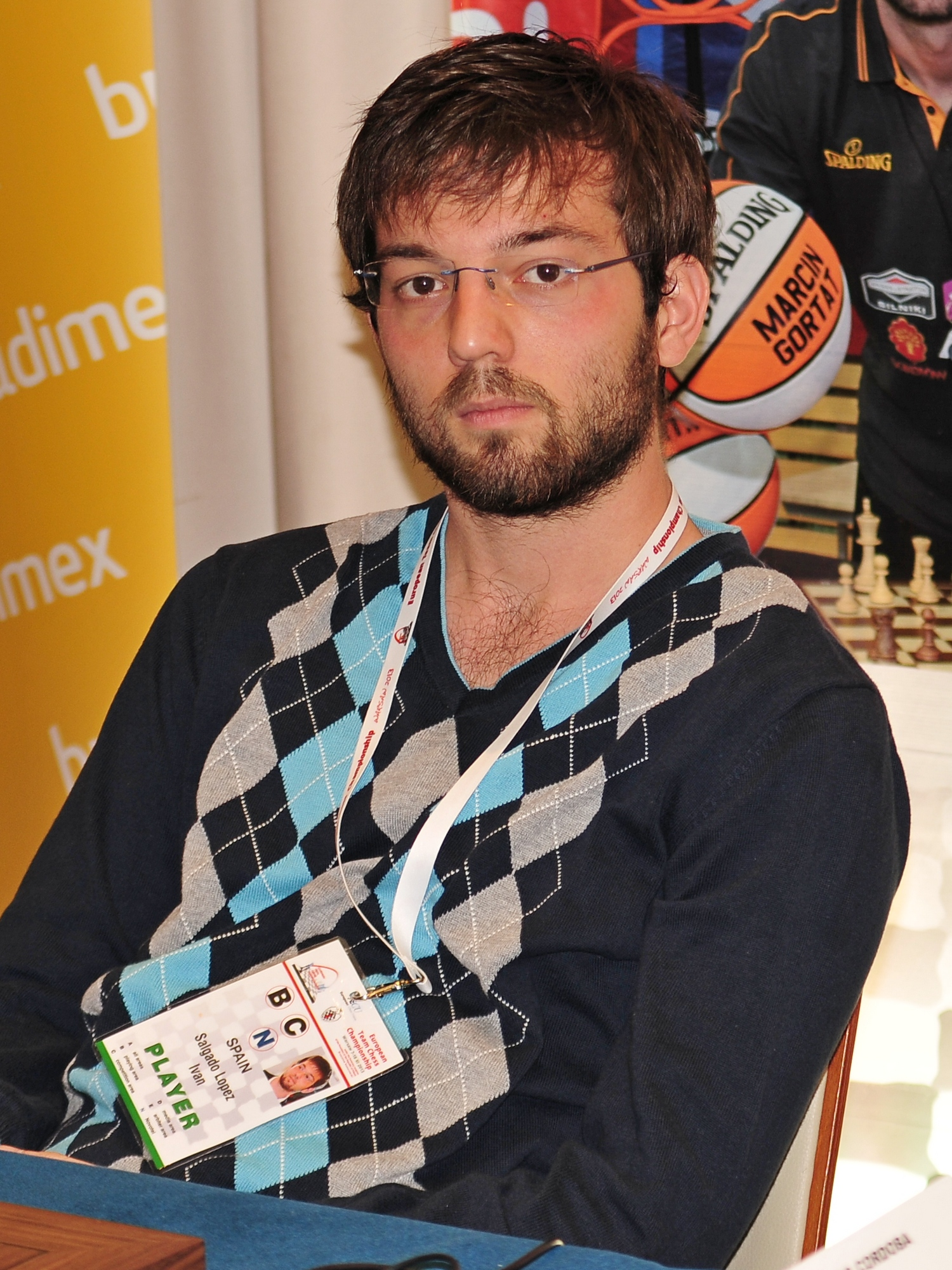
- Iván Salgado López in 2013

Personal information
- Born: June 29, 1991 (age 35) Ourense, Spain

Chess career
- Country: Spain
- Title: Grandmaster (2008)
- FIDE rating: 2591 (July 2026)
- Peak rating: 2662 (September 2016)
- Peak ranking: No. 88 (September 2016)

Iván Salgado López (born 29 June 1991) is a Galician Spanish chess player, who attained the rank of Grandmaster in 2008. He won the Iberoamerican Chess Championship in 2012 and the Spanish Chess Championship in 2013, and again in 2017.

In 2011 Salgado López won the Ciutat de Barcelona round-robin tournament edging Yasser Seirawan on tiebreak score. He played for the Spanish national team which finished tenth in the 41st Chess Olympiad, held Tromsø, Norway in August 2014.
