= Julen Luis Arizmendi Martínez =

Spanish chess grandmaster (born 1976)

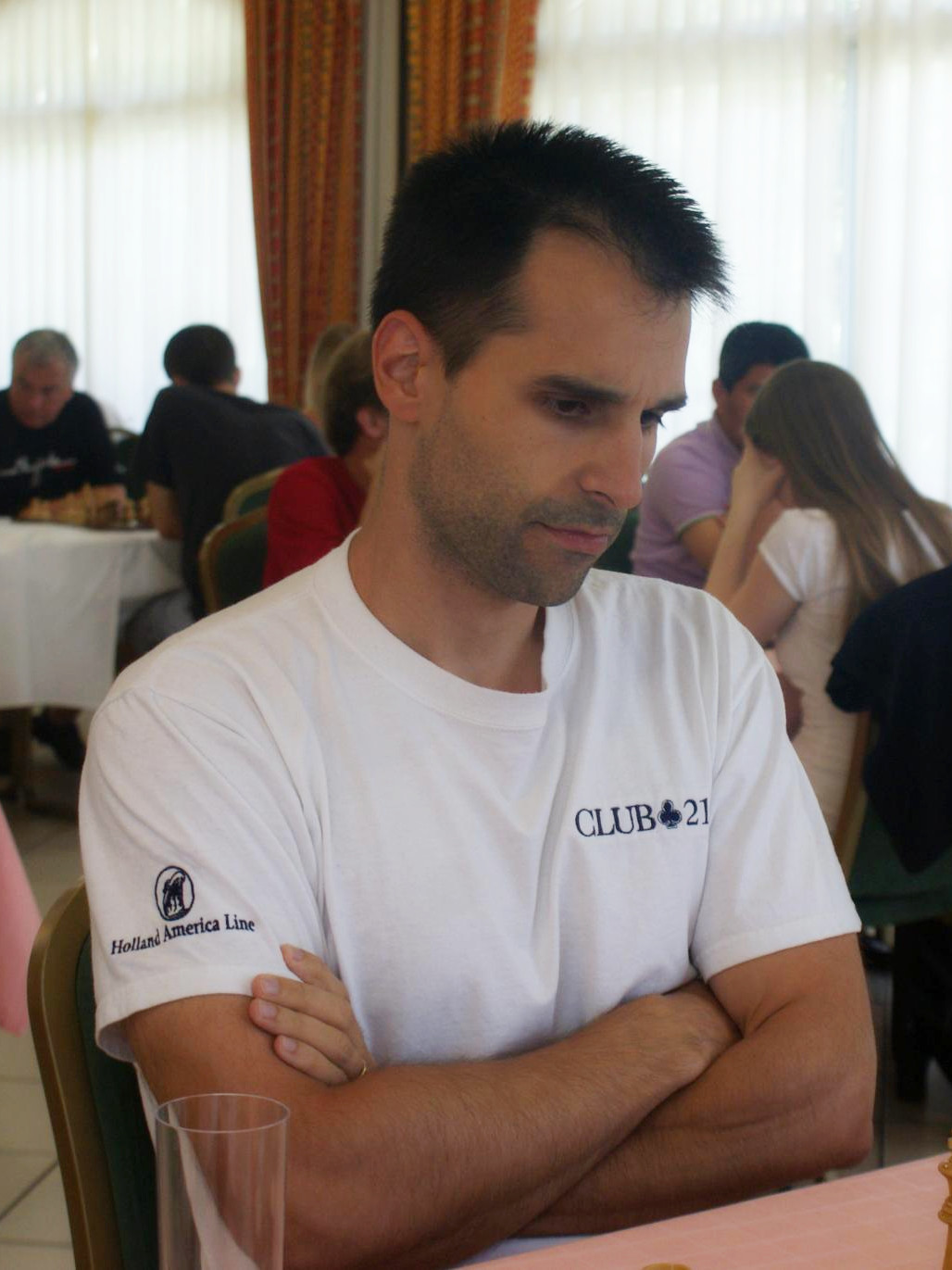
- Arizmendi in 2012

Personal information
- Born: 5 July 1976 (age 50) Weehawken, New Jersey, U.S.

Chess career
- Country: Spain
- Title: Grandmaster (2004)
- FIDE rating: 2465 (July 2026)
- Peak rating: 2580 (June 2013)

Julen Luís Arizmendi Martínez (born 5 July 1976) is a Spanish chess Grandmaster (GM) (2004), Spanish Chess Championship winner (2012).

== Biography ==
In the 2000s Arizmendi was one of the leading Spanish chess players. He three times won medals in Spanish Chess Championships: gold (2012), silver (2008) and bronze (2013). Other chess tournament successes of Arizmendi include: shared 1st place in Biel (2002), won in Cullera (2004), shared 1st place in Benidorm (2009).

Arizmendi played for Spain in the Chess Olympiads:

- In 2002, at second reserve board in the 35th Chess Olympiad in Bled (+4, =5, -1),
- In 2004, at second reserve board in the 36th Chess Olympiad in Calvià (+3, =4, -2),
- In 2006, at fourth board in the 37th Chess Olympiad in Turin (+2, =4, -1).

Arizmendi played for Spain in the European Team Chess Championships:

- In 2001, at second board in the 13th European Team Chess Championship in León (+1, =6, -1),
- In 2011, at reserve board in the 18th European Team Chess Championship in Porto Carras (+2, =1, -2).

In 2004, he was awarded the FIDE Grandmaster (GM) title.

== Bibliography ==
- Arizmendi, Julen (2005). Practical Chess Strategy. Quality Chess. ISBN 978-1-78483-266-7.
