= Miguel Illescas =

Spanish chess grandmaster (born 1965)

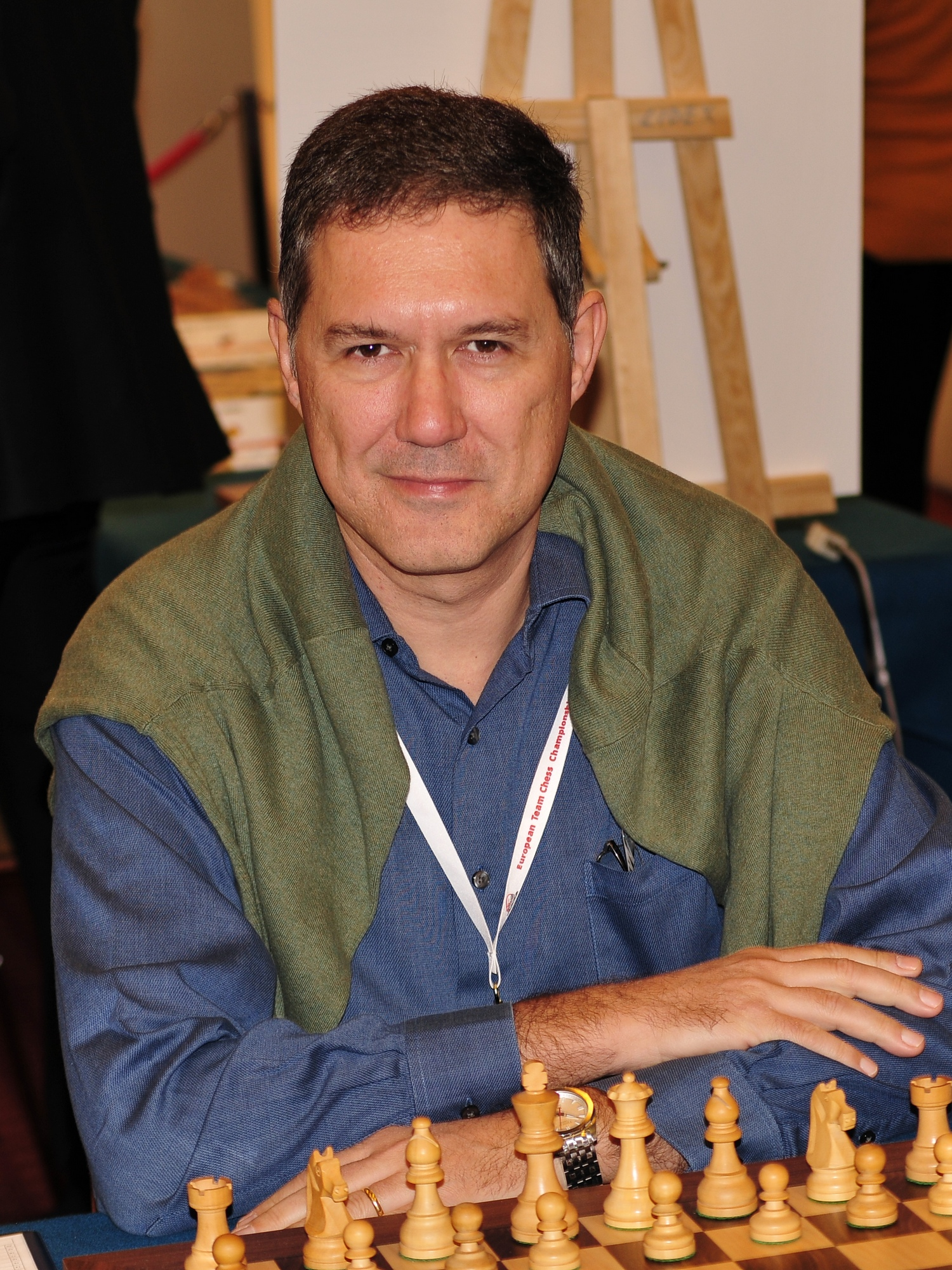
- Illescas at the 2013 European Team Chess Championship

Personal information
- Born: Miguel Illescas Córdoba; December 3, 1965 (age 60) Barcelona, Spain
- Spouse: Olga Alexandrova

Chess career
- Country: Spain
- Title: Grandmaster (1986)
- FIDE rating: 2587 (July 2026)
- Peak rating: 2640 (July 1996)
- Peak ranking: No. 26 (July 1996)

Miguel Illescas Córdoba (born December 3, 1965, in Barcelona) is a Spanish chess grandmaster.

== Chess career ==
Illescas was a highly skilled player as a youngster and became junior champion of Catalonia at the age of 12. A trained computer scientist, chess remained his real passion and continued progress brought him an International Master title in 1986, followed by the Grandmaster title in 1988. Illescas rapidly became Spain's strongest and most consistent player over many years, registering his country's highest ever Elo rating (2620) in 1993, making him at the time, world number 26. His 1993 match with Ljubomir Ljubojević ended 4-4, with all eight games drawn.

Around this time, he established his own chess school - La Escuela de Ajedrez de Miguel Illescas, or EDAMI for short. The school is flexibly structured and allows for students to learn at sessions held in the schools around Barcelona, or on the internet or as private lessons. EDAMI also acts as a chess supplier and not unlike the London Chess Centre, provides a shop, publishes a regular chess magazine and arranges events such as tournaments, simultaneous displays and the like.

As a young man, Illescas' tournament results were noteworthy; 1st= Las Palmas 1987 and 1988, 1st Oviedo 1991, 1st= Pamplona 1991/92 (with Leonid Yudasin), 2nd= Leon 1992 (after Boris Gulko), 3rd Chalkidiki 1992 (after Vladimir Kramnik and Joël Lautier), 1st Lisbon Zonal 1993 and 2nd Wijk aan Zee 1993 (after Anatoly Karpov). He kept winning during the latter part of the nineties also; 1st Linares (MEX) 1994, 1st Linares (ESP) Zonal 1995, 1st= Madrid 1996 (with Veselin Topalov) and 1st= Pamplona 1997/98 (with Ulf Andersson). More recently he finished 1st= at Pamplona in 2003, this time sharing victory with Luke McShane and Emil Sutovsky.

So far, he has won the Spanish national championship of 1995, 1998, 1999, 2001, 2004, 2005, 2007 and 2010. In team competition, he has represented his country at many Olympiads from 1986 onwards and won an individual bronze medal at Turin in 2006.

In 1997, he was appointed to the IBM-led team that prepared the super-computer Deep Blue in the build up to a second match with Garry Kasparov. Working with Joel Benjamin, Nick DeFirmian and John Fedorowicz, the project and match result were an unreserved success and this undoubtedly enhanced his reputation as an analyst, team player and perhaps most importantly, someone who understood the psyche of the incumbent world champion better than most.

Consequently, he was a logical choice to join Kramnik as a second for his world championship clash with Kasparov in 2000. Kramnik became champion and the winning partnership was restored for the 2004 defence against Peter Leko and the 2006 reunification match with Topalov (Topalov chose Illescas' compatriot Francisco Vallejo Pons for his own team of seconds). Illescas sees himself as part coach and part guru in these situations, involving himself with not just the chess analysis, but also the thought process and personality traits of the opponent.

In 2004 he was awarded the title of FIDE Senior Trainer.

As a sideline, he has also developed an interest in Fischer-Random chess and even laid down a challenge to Bobby Fischer to play a match with him.

With the arrival of super-grandmaster Alexei Shirov in 1994 and the subsequent emergence of Vallejo Pons as a world-class grandmaster, Illescas may no longer be the Spanish number one, but he remains widely respected.
