= 36th Chess Olympiad =

2004 chess tournament in Calvià, Spain

- Official logo of the Olympiad
- Host city: Calvià
- Country: Spain
- Nations: 125 (Open); 84 (Women)
- Teams: 129 (Open); 87 (Women)
- Athletes: 1,204
- Dates: 14–31 October 2004

Medalists

Team (Open)
- 1st place, gold medalist(s): Ukraine
- 2nd place, silver medalist(s): Russia
- 3rd place, bronze medalist(s): Armenia

Team (Women)
- 1st place, gold medalist(s): China
- 2nd place, silver medalist(s): United States
- 3rd place, bronze medalist(s): Russia

Individual (Open)
- (Georgia (country)) Baadur Jobava

Individual (Women)
- (United States) Susan Polgar

The 36th Chess Olympiad (Spanish: La 36^{a} Olimpíada de ajedrez; Catalan: La 36^{a} Olimpíada d'escacs), organized by the Fédération Internationale des Échecs (FIDE) and comprising an open (Note: Although commonly referred to as the men's division, this section is open to both male and female players.) and a women's tournament, as well as several events designed to promote the game of chess, took place between October 14 and October 31, 2004, in Calvià on the Spanish island of Mallorca. There were 129 teams in the open event and 87 in the women's event. In total, 1204 players were registered (some of whom did not play, though).

Both tournament sections were officiated by international arbiter Ignatius Leong (Singapore). Teams were paired across the 14 rounds of competition according to the Swiss system. The open division was played over four boards per round, whilst the women's was played over three. In the event of a draw, the tie-break was decided by 1. The Buchholz system; 2. Match points; 3. The Sonneborn–Berger system; and 4. The Median-Buchholz system.

The time control for each game permitted each player 90 minutes for all their moves, with an additional 30 seconds increment for each player after each move, beginning with the first.

== Open event ==
The open division was contested by 129 teams representing 125 nations. Spain, as hosts, fielded three teams, whilst the International Braille Chess Association (IBCA) and the International Physically Disabled Chess Association (IPCA) each provided one squad.

Led by first board Vasyl Ivanchuk, the seventh highest-rated player at the tournament, who recorded 9½ points over 13 rounds, and second reserve Sergey Karjakin who, aged just 14 years, won 6 of his 7 games (surrendering a draw only to American Gregory Kaidanov), Ukraine scored all four possible points in each of their first three matches before "only" defeating Russia 2½-1½ in the fourth round, eventually accumulating a nearly insurmountable three-point lead after the penultimate round. The Ukrainian team nevertheless scored three points against France and claimed their first title, three points ahead of Russia, who had entered the tournament as the top seed, having brought four of the tournament's nine highest-rated players, and as defending six-time champions.

Armenia, one of just four teams to draw a match with Ukraine, paced by second board Levon Aronian, who did not lose in 12 games, and third board Rafael Vaganian, who scored 8½ points in 11 games, lost 1½-2½ to Russia in the eighth round. Ultimately, on the strength of a 3½-½ final round defeat of Georgia, they tied Russia's 36½ points. Armenia were placed after Russia, though, on the Buchholz tie-breaker system employed by the Olympiad, and finished, as in the previous Olympiad, with the bronze medals. Hosts Spain, led by Alexei Shirov, just managed to squeeze into the top ten.

Notable absentees from the tournament were the no. 1 player in the world, Garry Kasparov, as well as classical World Champion Vladimir Kramnik and his challenger Peter Leko, who were just finishing their championship match (Kramnik retained his title with a 7–7 tie). FIDE Champion Rustam Kasimdzhanov was present, however, and led Uzbekistan to 14th place by going undefeated in his 8 games (+4-0=4).

Open event
#	Country	Players	Average rating	Points	Buchholz
1	Ukraine	Ivanchuk, Ponomariov, Volokitin, Moiseenko, Eljanov, Karjakin	2680	39½	
2	Russia	Morozevich, Svidler, Grischuk, Dreev, Khalifman, Zvjaginsev	2718	36½	460.0
3	Armenia	Akopian, Aronian, Vaganian, Lputian, Sargissian, Minasian	2660	36½	459.0
4	United States	Onischuk, Shabalov, Goldin, Kaidanov, Novikov, Gulko	2623	35	
5	Israel	Gelfand, Sutovsky, Smirin, Avrukh, Huzman, Roiz	2670	34½	
6	India	Viswanathan Anand, Krishnan Sasikiran, Pendyala Harikrishna, Surya Shekhar Ganguly, Abhijit Kunte, Chanda Sandipan	2655	34	
7	Cuba	Domínguez, Bruzón, Delgado, Nogueiras, Arencibia, Quezada	2596	33½	
8	Netherlands	Van Wely, Sokolov, Tiviakov, Timman, Van den Doel, Nijboer	2641	33	
9	Bulgaria	Georgiev, Delchev, Cheparinov, Spasov, Chatalbashev, Radulski	2584	32½	453.0
10	Spain	Shirov, Vallejo Pons, Illescas Córdoba, Cifuentes Parada, Romero Holmes, Arizmendi Martínez	2643	32½	439.5

#	Country	Average rating	Points	Buchholz	MP
11	Greece	2569	32½	427.5	
12	Poland	2624	32	445.5	
13	Switzerland	2559	32	442.5	
14	Uzbekistan	2550	32	440.5	
15	Serbia and Montenegro	2568	32	435.0	
16	Germany	2617	32	430.0	
17	Slovenia	2575	32	427.5	
18	Belarus	2609	32	424.0	
19	Philippines	2502	32	422.5	
20	Romania	2590	32	417.5	
21	Georgia	2621	31½	462.0	
22	Azerbaijan	2615	31½	450.5	
23	France	2621	31½	449.0	
24	China	2612	31½	438.5	
25	Bosnia and Herzegovina	2532	31½	428.0	
26	Kazakhstan	2483	31½	425.0	
27	Lithuania	2542	31½	420.0	
28	Denmark	2563	31½	419.5	
29	Czech Republic	2589	31	445.0	
30	England	2653	31	427.0	
31	Hungary	2614	31	425.5	
32	Estonia	2544	31	423.5	17
33	Latvia	2539	31	423.5	15
34	Argentina	2544	31	419.5	
35	Australia	2488	31	418.5	
36	Moldova	2589	30½	432.5	
37	Slovakia	2545	30½	431.0	
38	Canada	2494	30½	426.0	
39	Norway	2549	30½	419.5	
40	Chile	2486	30½	407.5	
41	Bangladesh	2485	30½	396.5	
42	North Macedonia	2521	30	419.0	
43	Ireland	2454	30	403.0	
44	Spain "B"	2494	29½	424.0	
45	Sweden	2569	29½	422.0	
46	Croatia	2562	29½	415.5	
47	Iceland	2496	29½	413.5	
48	Indonesia	2397	29½	408.0	
49	Finland	2456	29½	406.5	
50	Turkey	2365	29½	404.0	
51	Vietnam	2515	29	416.5	
52	Scotland	2497	29	411.5	
53	Iran	2460	29	405.0	
54	Mexico	2473	29	403.0	
55	South Africa	2387	29	395.0	16
56	Colombia	2427	29	395.0	13
57	IPCA	2348	29	394.5	
58	Belgium	2444	28½	406.5	
59	Brazil	2481	28½	406.0	
60	Italy	2476	28½	400.5	14
61	Tajikistan	2303	28½	400.5	12
62	Austria	2444	28½	396.5	
63	Dominican Republic	2354	28½	387.0	14
64	Ecuador	2431	28½	387.0	13
65	Bolivia	2332	28½	383.5	
66	Peru	2410	28½	355.0	
67	Singapore	2437	28	403.5	
68	Andorra	2400	28	393.0	
69	Pakistan	2298	28	381.5	
70	Malaysia	2241	28	370.0	
71	Mongolia	2381	27½	402.0	
72	Portugal	2424	27½	401.0	
73	Kyrgyzstan	2341	27½	397.0	
74	Albania	2410	27½	385.5	
75	Faroe Islands	2281	27½	377.0	
76	Morocco	2342	27½	356.0	
77	Venezuela	2354	27	398.0	
78	Paraguay	2305	27	390.0	
79	Costa Rica	2399	27	386.0	
80	Tunisia	2363	27	384.5	
81	Spain "C"	2334	27	383.5	
82	Luxembourg	2325	27	381.5	
83	Iraq	2276	27	369.5	
84	Uruguay	2370	26½	397.5	
85	New Zealand	2316	26½	383.0	
86	Nicaragua	2281	26½	375.5	
87	Guatemala	2252	26½	372.0	
88	Japan	2136	26½	351.0	
89	Wales	2289	26	382.5	
90	Lebanon	2337	26	379.0	
91	Sri Lanka	2188	26	368.5	
92	Thailand	2264	26	367.5	
93	Honduras	2226	26	365.0	
94	Puerto Rico	2212	26	358.0	
95	Botswana	2174	25½	358.5	
96	Kenya	1986	25½	340.5	
97	IBCA	2358	25	370.5	
98	Barbados	2279	25	368.5	
99	Libya	2260	25	358.5	
100	Angola	2245	24½	376.5	
101	Hong Kong	2141	24½	363.0	
102	Palestine	2070	24½	362.5	
103	Jamaica	2184	24½	355.5	
104	Uganda	2187	24½	350.0	
105	Monaco	2137	24½	347.0	
106	Nepal	2179	24½	301.0	
107	Panama	1906	24	352.5	
108	Namibia	2186	24	336.0	
109	Cyprus	2202	23½	360.5	
110	Liechtenstein	2119	23½	348.5	
111	Mauritania	2207	23½	341.0	
112	San Marino	2122	23½	301.0	
113	Malta	2157	23½	300.5	
114	Macau	2127	23½	299.0	
115	Afghanistan	1866	23½	248.0	
116	Trinidad and Tobago	2137	23	357.5	
117	Suriname	2201	23	344.5	
118	British Virgin Islands	1904	23	314.5	
119	Netherlands Antilles	2098	22	293.5	
120	Nigeria	2152	22	276.5	
121	Jersey	2170	21½	313.5	
122	Fiji	2003	21½	282.5	
123	Guernsey	1812	21		
124	Aruba	1832	20½		
125	Bermuda	1824	18½ ^{1}		
126	Rwanda	1750	17		
127	Papua New Guinea	1866	15½ ^{1}		
128	United States Virgin Islands	1600	13½		
129	Seychelles	1766	11½		

^{1} Bermuda actually scored 22 and Papua New Guinea 23 points, but because some of their players refused to submit to doping tests, the points scored by those players were deducted from the final scores: 3½ points from Bermuda and 7½ from Papua New Guinea.

=== Group prizes ===
In addition to the overall medals, prizes were given out to the best teams in five different seeding groups—in other words, the teams who exceeded their seeding the most. Overall medal winners were not eligible for group prizes.

Group Prizes
Group	Seeding range	Team	Seed	Overall finish
A	1–25	United States	10	4
B	26–51	Switzerland	29	13
C	52–77	Ireland	54	43
D	78–103	Tajikistan	83	61
E	104–129	Japan	112	87

=== Individual medals ===
- Performance rating: (Georgia (country)) Baadur Jobava 2842
- Board 1: (Palestine) Evgenij Ermenkov 10½ / 12 = 87.5%
- Board 2: (Morocco) Mohamed Tissir 7½ / 9 = 83.3%
- Board 3: (Armenia) Rafael Vaganian 9½ / 12 = 79.2%
- Board 4: (Georgia (country)) Baadur Jobava 8½ / 10 = 85.0%
- 1st reserve: (Lithuania) Vaidas Sakalauskas 6 / 7 = 85.7%
- 2nd reserve: (Ukraine) Sergey Karjakin and (Libya) Ibrahim Chahrani 6½ / 7 = 92.9%

== Women's event ==
The women's division was contested by 87 teams representing 84 nations. Spain, as hosts, fielded two teams, whilst the International Braille Chess Association (IBCA) and the International Physically Disabled Chess Association (IPCA) each provided one squad.

China, led by first board Xie Jun (ex-World Champion) and second board Xu Yuhua (future champion), entered the competition as top seed and defending triple champions and quickly took the lead, conceding just two draws in their first five matches. They then defeated the silver and bronze medallists from the previous Olympiad, Russia and Poland (each 2–1), in the sixth and eighth rounds, respectively. Eventually they carried a six-point lead into a tenth round match with second placed United States.

Susan Polgar (another ex-World Champion), who entered the tournament as the second highest-rated player and achieved the best performance rating of all, drew Xie Jun, while Irina Krush won her second board game against Xu Yuhua. A draw by Anna Zatonskih against Zhao Xue gave the Americans a 2–1 win over the Chinese team. In rounds eleven and twelve, China drew Hungary and lost to Georgia, whilst the US team defeated Slovakia and then scored a 2½-½ victory over Hungary, drawing within three points of China with two rounds remaining. China, though, defeated sixth-seed India and 12th-seed Slovakia in the final two rounds, scoring four points to preserve what was ultimately a three-point win and to clinch the Vera Menchik Trophy for a fourth consecutive time.

Second-seed Russia were led by Nadezhda Kosintseva, who won top honours on the first reserve board for scoring 10 points in 12 rounds. The Russians were only in eighth place after ten rounds but had advanced to fourth place entering the penultimate round, where they faced Georgia, who they trailed by half a point. Although first board Maya Chiburdanidze (ex-World Champion) and second board Nana Dzagnidze, who both scored 8½ points for their team over the event, drew their matches, third board Lela Javakhishvili lost to Kosintseva, giving the Russian team a half-point lead over Georgia; although Georgia defeated Ukraine 2½-½ in the final round, Russia managed to secure two points against France, equalling Georgia's total and winning the bronze medals on tie-breaks.

Newly crowned World Champion Antoaneta Stefanova disappointed as captain of the Bulgarian team, scoring only 5½ points in 11 games. Bulgaria eventually finished in 14th place.

#	Country	Players	Average rating	Points	Buchholz
1	China	Xie Jun, Xu Yuhua, Zhao Xue, Huang Qian	2514	31	
2	United States	Polgar, Krush, Zatonskih, Shahade	2490	28	
3	Russia	Kosteniuk, T. Kosintseva, Kovalevskaya, N. Kosintseva	2491	27½	346.0
4	Georgia	Chiburdanidze, Dzagnidze, Javakhishvili, Lomineishvili	2470	27½	339.0
5	France	Skripchenko, Marie Sebag, Silvia Collas, Sophie Milliet	2417	25½	
6	Hungary	Mádl, Vajda, Gara, Lakos	2376	25	348.5
7	Slovakia	Repkova, Pokorná, Hagarova, Borošová	2377	25	337.0
8	England	Hunt, Houska, Richards, Buckley	2293	25	334.5
9	India	Humpy Koneru, Subbaraman Vijayalakshmi, Dronavalli Harika, Nisha Mohota	2435	24½	352.0
10	Poland	Radziewicz, Soćko, Dworakowska, Zielinska	2428	24½	340.0

#	Country	Average rating	Points	Buchholz	MP
11	Armenia	2374	24½	330.5	
12	Netherlands	2372	24½	317.5	
13	Lithuania	2311	24	329.5	
14	Bulgaria	2410	24	329.0	
15	Sweden	2301	24	327.0	
16	Serbia and Montenegro	2406	24	324.5	
17	Germany	2365	24	323.5	
18	Ukraine	2456	23½	342.0	
19	Slovenia	2288	23½	325.5	
20	Romania	2408	23½	318.5	
21	Vietnam	2308	23½	317.0	
22	Azerbaijan	2317	23	325.0	
23	Latvia	2294	23	323.0	
24	Cuba	2303	23	321.0	
25	Israel	2247	23	320.5	
26	Moldova	2296	23	313.5	
27	Belarus	2278	23	308.0	
28	Czech Republic	2308	22½	313.5	
29	Greece	2343	22½	311.5	
30	Argentina	2274	22½	302.0	
31	Switzerland	2250	22½	298.0	
32	Uzbekistan	2235	22½	293.0	
33	Kazakhstan	2317	22	315.5	
34	Iran	2208	22	313.5	
35	Mongolia	2263	22	313.0	
36	Estonia	2229	22	290.0	
37	Colombia	2115	21½	303.0	
38	Norway	2149	21½	302.5	
39	Croatia	2243	21½	299.5	
40	Malaysia	2084	21½	299.0	
41	Canada	2123	21½	277.0	
42	Finland	2144	21	299.0	
43	Spain	2242	21	297.0	
44	Spain "B"	2187	21	296.5	
45	Bosnia and Herzegovina	2146	21	293.0	
46	Italy	2213	21	292.0	
47	Australia	2243	20½	306.0	
48	Philippines	1940	20½	295.0	
49	Portugal	2124	20½	292.0	
50	Venezuela	2147	20½	288.5	
51	Iceland	2148	20½	288.0	
52	Wales	1975	20½	285.0	
53	Turkey	2082	20½	283.5	
54	Brazil	2072	20½	282.5	
55	Austria	2122	20	292.0	
56	North Macedonia	2002	20	288.5	
57	Mexico	2134	20	281.5	
58	Kyrgyzstan	1760	20	279.0	
59	Indonesia	1775	20	277.5	
60	Guatemala	1748	20	276.0	
61	Peru	2138	20	274.5	
62	Albania	1749	20	265.0	
63	Ecuador	2224	19½	295.0	
64	Denmark	2133	19½	289.0	
65	Lebanon	1942	19½	282.0	
66	IPCA	2080	19½	270.0	
67	Iraq	1704	19½	229.5	
68	South Africa	1875	19	291.0	
69	Bangladesh	2120	19	276.5	
70	Tajikistan	1600	19	261.5	
71	Bolivia	1763	19	259.0	
72	Costa Rica	1764	19	226.5	
73	Botswana	1884	19	220.5	
74	Luxembourg	1981	18½	292.5	
75	IBCA	1875	18½	257.0	
76	Puerto Rico	1878	18½	231.5	
77	Dominican Republic	2023	18	275.5	
78	New Zealand	1899	18	242.0	
79	Sri Lanka	1600	18	233.0	
80	Ireland	1891	17½		
81	Fiji	1600	16½		
82	Libya	1695	13½		
83	Japan	1716	12½		
84	Trinidad and Tobago	1600	12	209.0	
85	Honduras	1600	12	206.5	
86	Kenya	1600	11		
87	United States Virgin Islands	1600	8		

=== Group prizes ===
In addition to the overall medals, prizes were given out to the best teams in five different seeding groups—in other words, the teams who exceeded their seeding the most. Overall medal winners were not eligible for group prizes.

Group Prizes
Group	Seeding range	Team	Seed	Overall finish
A	1–17	Georgia	4	4
B	18–34	England	27	8
C	35–51	Uzbekistan	37	32
D	52–69	Colombia	55	37
E	70–87	Kyrgyzstan	75	58

=== Individual medals ===
- Performance rating: (United States) Susan Polgar 2622
- Board 1: (Lithuania) Viktorija Čmilytė 8½ / 11 = 77.3%
- Board 2: (Hungary) Szidonia Vajda and (Romania) Corina Peptan 9 / 12 = 75.0%
- Board 3: (China) Zhao Xue and (Indonesia) Irine Kharisma Sukandar 10 / 12 = 83.3%
- Reserve: (Russia) Nadezhda Kosintseva 10 / 12 = 83.3%

== Overall title ==
The Nona Gaprindashvili Trophy is awarded to the nation that has the best average rank in the open and women's divisions. Where two or more teams are tied, they are ordered by best single finish in either division and then by total number of points scored.

The trophy, named after the former women's World Champion (1961–78), was created by FIDE in 1997.

#	Team	Open division	Women's division	Average
1	Russia	2	3	2½
2	United States	4	2	3
3	Armenia	3	11	7

== Controversies ==
=== Azmaiparashvili incident ===
Prior to the closing ceremony of the Olympiad, FIDE vice president Zurab Azmaiparashvili attempted to ascend the stage in order to inform the presenter of the Nona Gaprindashvili Trophy that the latter ought more clearly to explain Gaprindashvili's contributions to the game of chess (Gaprindashvili had been World Champion for 17 years). Security officers, in conjunction with local police, did not permit Azmaiparashvili access to tournament organizers, and a struggle ensued after which Azmaiparashvili, having sustained several injuries, was arrested by the local law enforcement. He secured his release on bail for € 500 after having been held for 40 hours, and the charges against him were later dropped.

Azmaiparashvili and FIDE averred that Azmaiparashvili was detained and physically accosted despite he had properly and clearly [displayed] his VIP credentials, whilst representatives of the Spanish chess federation ("Federación Española de Ajedrez") and tournament organizers blamed Azmaiparashvili for the incident, saying that he without any previous provocation, assaulted [an] agent with a head butt to [the] mouth.

=== Drug testing ===
Having been formally recognized by the International Olympic Committee in 1999, in preparation for prospective inclusion in future iterations of the Olympic Games, FIDE implemented (in 2001) doping restrictions consistent with those adopted by the World Anti-Doping Agency (WADA). Two players, Shaun Press of Papua New Guinea and Bobby Miller of Bermuda, refused, for various reasons, to submit urine samples for analysis. Both players appeared before the FIDE Doping Hearing panel, which decided to cancel the players' performances (Press had scored 7½ points in 14 games, while Miller had scored 3½ points in 9 games), reducing the final score of Papua New Guinea to 15½ (from 23) and that of Bermuda to 18½ (from 22).

== Associated events ==
Concomitant to the tournaments were several chess-related events planned by the organizing committee of the Olympiad, some under the auspices of FIDE; the events were known collectively as the First Chess Festival Calvià 2004. Within the festival were held simultaneous exhibitions, game demonstrations and lectures by top Spanish players, and several secondary tournaments, including one for amateur players, a rapid chess event for players aged under 16, and one for senior players.

Chess classes were introduced into the primary and secondary schools, as well as senior centers, in and around Calvià in an effort to promote chess generally, and chess films were screened on the beaches of Calvià every weeknight during the Olympiad. Chess-oriented art was displayed at an International Chess Fair, with prizes for top works awarded by a jury.
