= Francisco José Pérez =

Spanish-Cuban chess player (1920–1999)

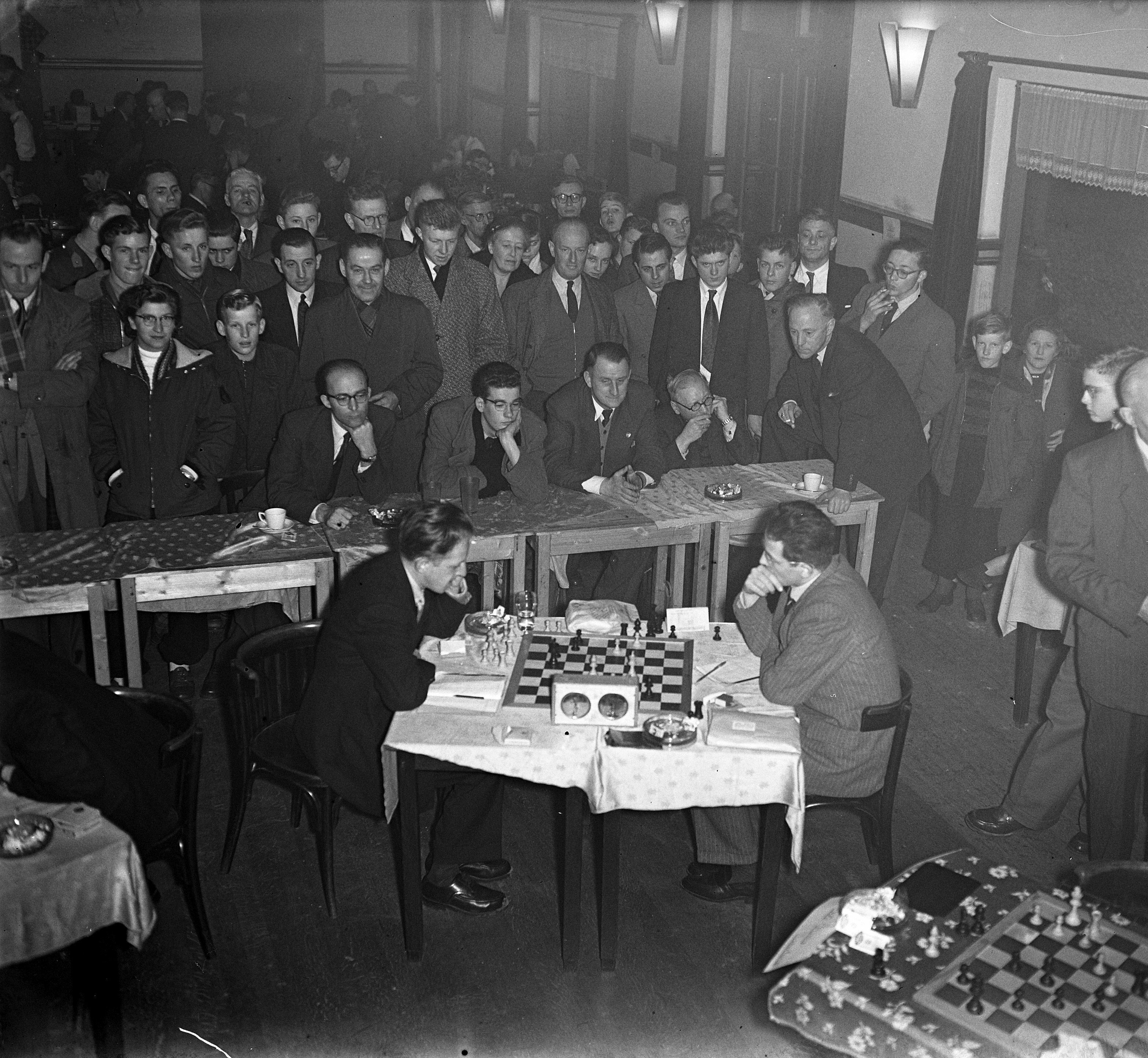
- Milić vs. Pérez (1955)

Personal information
- Born: Francisco José Pérez Pérez; September 8, 1920 Vigo, Spain
- Died: September 11, 1999 (aged 79)

Chess career
- Country: Spain (until 1960); Cuba (after 1960)
- Title: International Master (1959)
- Peak rating: 2325 (January 1976)

Francisco José Pérez Pérez (8 September 1920 – 11 September 1999) was a Spanish/Cuban chess player. Born in Vigo, Spain, he won the Spanish Chess Championship in 1948, 1954, and 1960. He played for Spain in the Chess Olympiads of 1958 and 1960 and in the 1961 European Team Chess Championship.

In international tournaments, his best result was a share of first place at Madrid 1959. FIDE awarded him the International Master (IM) title in 1959. After emigrating to Cuba he played second board on the Cuban team in the 1964 Olympiad.
