= Francisco Vallejo Pons =

Spanish chess grandmaster (born 1982)

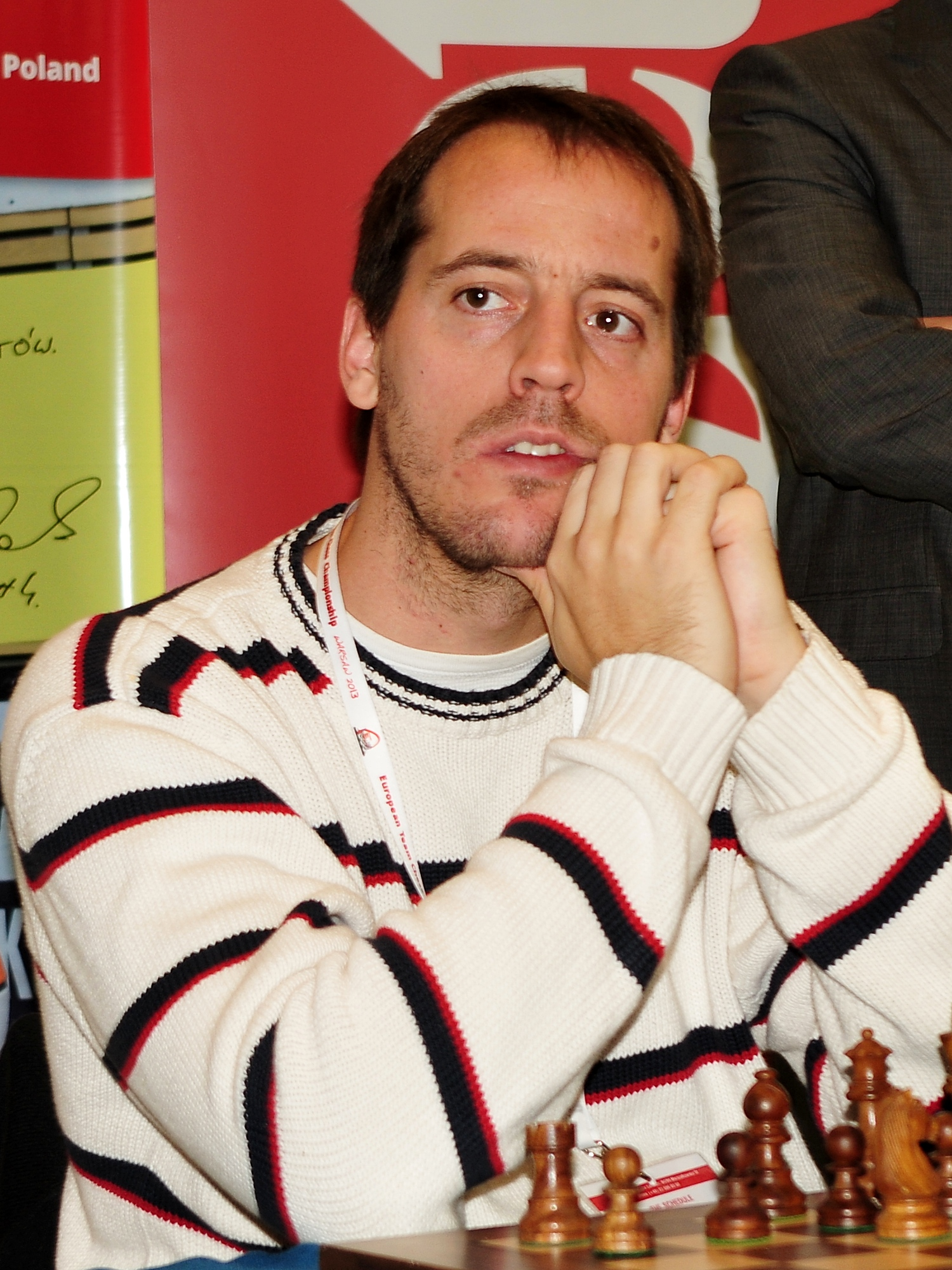
- Vallejo in 2013

Personal information
- Born: 21 August 1982 (age 43) Mahón, Menorca, Spain

Chess career
- Country: Spain
- Title: Grandmaster (1999)
- FIDE rating: 2644 (July 2026)
- Peak rating: 2724 (July 2011)
- Ranking: No. 74 (July 2026)
- Peak ranking: No. 18 (January 2005)

Francisco Vallejo Pons (born 21 August 1982) is a Spanish chess grandmaster. He is a five-time Spanish Chess Champion.

He achieved the Grandmaster title at the age of 16 years and 9 months. He won the under-18 World Chess Youth Championship in 2000.

In 2001 he won the Capablanca Memorial.

In 2012 he won the Ciudad de Leon Masters after defeating Veselin Topalov 3½–2½.

In 2013 he tied for first at the European Individual Championship.

== Early life ==
The son of a soldier, he was born in Mahon and grew up in Es Castell. Several members of his family played chess, and he learned the game from them.

== Notable games ==
On 25 February 2006 he defeated FIDE world champion Veselin Topalov in 56 moves with the black pieces at the SuperGM Linares-Morelia chess tournament.

Topalov vs. Vallejo
1.d4 d5 2.c4 c6 3.Nc3 Nf6 4.Nf3 e6 5.Bg5 h6 6.Bh4 dxc4 7.e4 g5 8.Bg3 b5 9.Be2 Bb7 10.0-0 Nbd7 11.Ne5 h5 12.Nxd7 Qxd7 13.Be5 Rh6 14.f3 Qe7 15.a4 a6 16.Qc2 Rd8 17.Rad1 Nd7 18.Bc7 Rc8 19.Bg3 e5 20.d5 b4 21.dxc6 Rhxc6 22.Nd5 Qe6 23.Qd2 h4 24.Bf2
(diagram 1 )
24... c3 25.bxc3 bxc3 26.Qxg5 c2 27.Rc1 h3 28.g3 Qh6 29.Qf5 Qd2 30.Rfe1 Ba3 31.f4 Bxc1 32.Bh5 Rg6 33.Bxg6 Bxd5 34.exd5
(diagram 2 )
34... Qxe1+ 35.Bxe1 Be3+ 36.Kf1 c1=Q 37.Qxf7+ Kd8 38.Ke2 Bb6 39.Bd2 Qc4+ 40.Kf3 e4+ 41.Kg4 Kc7 42.a5 Bd4 43.Bf5 Rg8+ 44.Kh4 Rh8+ 45.Kg5 Qb5 46.Be6 e3 47.Be1 e2 48.g4 Rf8 49.Qh7 Be3 50.Kh4 Bxf4 51.g5 Qa4 52.Kh5 Bxh2 53.Bxh3 Be5 54.Qd3 Rh8+ 55.Kg6 Nf8+ 56.Kf7 Kd8 (diagram 3 ) 0–1

Topalov vs. Vallejo Pons
diagram 1

Position: g1 white king, f1 white rook, d1 white rook, h2 white pawn, g2 white pawn, f2 white bishop, e2 white bishop, d2 white queen, b2 white pawn, f3 white pawn, h4 black pawn, e4 white pawn, c4 black pawn, b4 black pawn, a4 white pawn, g5 black pawn, e5 black pawn, d5 white knight, e6 black queen, c6 black rook, a6 black pawn, f7 black pawn, d7 black knight, b7 black bishop, f8 black bishop, e8 black king, c8 black rook

Position after 24.Bf2

diagram 2

Position: g1 white king, e1 white rook, c1 black bishop, h2 white pawn, f2 white bishop, d2 black queen, c2 black pawn, h3 black pawn, g3 white pawn, f4 white pawn, a4 white pawn, f5 white queen, e5 black pawn, d5 white pawn, g6 white bishop, a6 black pawn, f7 black pawn, d7 black knight, e8 black king, c8 black rook

Position after 34.exd5
diagram 3

Position: e1 white bishop, e2 black pawn, h3 white bishop, d3 white queen, a4 black queen, g5 white pawn, e5 black bishop, d5 white pawn, a5 white pawn, a6 black pawn, f7 white king, h8 black rook, f8 black knight, d8 black king

Final position after 56... Kd8

== Retirement and return to chess ==
After a loss in his penultimate round against Sergey Karjakin in the 2012 Bilbao Chess Masters Final, Vallejo announced his retirement from competitive chess.

Since then he has made multiple appearances in tournaments, for instance in 2014 Bilbao Chess Masters, as well as competed in country leagues.

Vallejo participated in the Grand Prix cycle for 2017–18, after being active in 2016. Having played in the Sharjah and Moscow legs of the event, and finished in the bottom half of the field in both, he had no mathematical chance to qualify for the 2018 Candidates Tournament via the Grand Prix.
