= Jesús de la Villa =

Spanish chess grandmaster (born 1958)

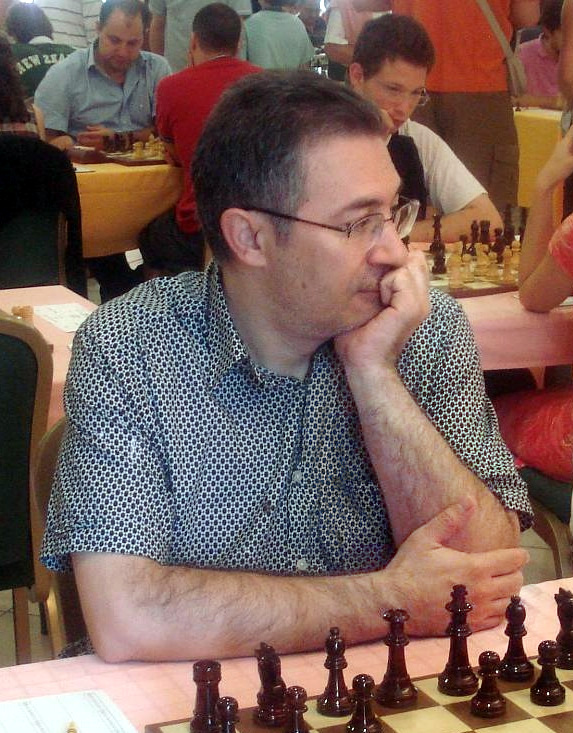

Personal information
- Born: Jesús María de la Villa Garcia; June 30, 1958 (age 68) Palencia, Spain

Chess career
- Country: Spain
- Title: Grandmaster (1999)
- FIDE rating: 2420 (July 2026)
- Peak rating: 2496 (May 2010)

Jesús María de la Villa Garcia (born June 30, 1958) is a Spanish chess grandmaster. He won the Spanish Chess Championship twice, in 1985 and 1988. He is a chess author and coach. In 2010 he was awarded the title of FIDE Senior Trainer.

== Books ==
- de la Villa, Jesús (2008). 100 Endgames You Must Know: Vital Lessons for Every Chess Player. New in Chess. ISBN 978-90-5691-244-4.
- de la Villa, Jesús (2009). Dismantling the Sicilian. New in Chess. ISBN 978-90-5691-294-9.
- de la Villa, Jesús (2019). The 100 Endgames You Must Know Workbook: Practical Endgame Exercises for Every Chess Player. New in Chess. ISBN 978-90-5691-817-0.
- de la Villa, Jesús (2022). 100 Endgame Patterns You Must Know: Recognize Key Moves & Motifs and Avoid Typical Errors. New in Chess. ISBN 978-90-5691-972-6.
- de la Villa, Jesús (2024). 50 Mistakes You Should Know. New in Chess. ISBN 978-9083406442.
- de la Villa, Jesús (2026). 100 Basic Endgames You Must Know: A Starter's Guide to Chess Endgames. New in Chess. ISBN 978-9083627915.
