= List of Spanish chess players =

A list of Spanish chess players:

- Miguel Albareda Creus
- Olga Alexandrova
- Beatriz Alfonso Nogue
- Vicente Almirall Castell
- Alvar Alonso Rosell
- Francisco de Castellví y Vic
- Roberto Cifuentes Parada
- Juan Corzo
- Jesús Díez del Corral
- Javier Ochoa de Echagüen
- Rey Enigma
- Miguel Farré Mallofré
- Bernat Fenollar
- Zenón Franco Ocampos
- Leontxo García
- Celso Golmayo Zúpide
- Manuel Golmayo
- David Antón Guijarro
- Irisberto Herrera
- José Carlos Ibarra Jeréz
- Miguel Illescas
- Alexander Ipatov
- Oleg Korneev
- Ruy López de Segura
- Luis Ramírez de Lucena
- Jordi Magem Badals
- Valentí Marín
- Ángel Martín González
- David Martínez
- Ana Matnadze
- Antonio Medina García
- Francisco José Pérez Pérez
- Arturo Pomar
- Ramón Rey Ardid
- Antonio Rico
- Orestes Rodríguez
- Fernando Saavedra
- Iván Salgado López
- Josep Tolosa
- Elizbar Ubilava
- Francisco Vallejo Pons
- Sabrina Vega Gutiérrez
- Francesch Vicent
