= José Ángel Guerra Méndez =

Cuban-Spanish chess grandmaster (born 1988)

Personal information
- Born: January 20, 1988 (age 38) Santiago de Cuba, Cuba

Chess career
- Country: Cuba (until 2017); Spain (since 2017)
- Title: Grandmaster (2017)
- FIDE rating: 2431 (November 2026)
- Peak rating: 2550 (May 2018)

José Ángel Guerra Méndez is a Cuban chess Grandmaster (2017) who represents Spain.

In the December 2021 FIDE rating list, he had an Elo rating of 2,509 points, making him the 22nd-highest-rated active player in Spain. His peak rating was 2,542 points, achieved in the May 2016 list.

== Chess career ==
In April 2017, Guerra Méndez won the 44th International Open of La Roda, Albacete, finishing ahead of strong players such as Fernando Peralta, Tigran Gharamian, and Vladimir Baklan.

In March 2018, he finished second in the Catalan Chess Championship after losing the tiebreak games in the final against Grandmaster Hipólito Asís. In April 2019, he won the Catalan Chess Championship in Vila-seca, finishing ahead of Grandmaster Miguel Muñoz Pantoja.

Awards
Preceded by Hipolito Asis Gargatagli	Catalan Chess Championship; 2019	Succeeded by Hipolito Asis Gargatagli
