= Ilmari Rahm =

Finnish chess player

Personal information
- Born: 22 November 1888 Käkisalmi, Russia
- Died: 1939

Chess career
- Country: Finland

Ahti Ilmari Rahm (22 November 1888 – 1939) was a Finnish chess player, founder and first editor of the chess magazine Suomen Shakki (1924 – 1931).

== Biography ==
Ilmari Rahm was born in Käkisalmi (nowadays Priozersk in Russia). Later he moved with his parents to Helsinki and received a medical education. From 1918 to 1921 Ilmari Rahm served in the Finnish Navy. He retired with the rank of captain of the medical service. After retiring, he worked in Helsinki. He was a member of the Helsinki chess club HSK. In the years 1923–1924 he was a club secretary, in 1925–1928 – Member of the Presidium, since 1929 – President. Ilmari Rahm was a representative of the HSK club in Finnish Chess Federation. He held various posts in the federation: in 1923 he was secretary, in 1928–1929 and 1930–1931 he was vice chairman.

In 1927, Ilmari Rahm took part in the Finnish Chess Championship. He won the qualifying tournament with a score of 7½ of 11 (half a point ahead Ragnar Krogius, Birger Axel Rasmusson and Erkki Vilen), but then lost 2:4 Edgar Lindroos in the match for the right to challenge the title against Anatol Tschepurnoff (in a match with Lindroos Chepurnov was able to defend the title of champion of Finland). For the victory in the qualifying tournament, Ilmari Rahm was awarded the title of National Master (the first in the chess club HSK).

Since 1923 Ilmari Rahm was worked as chess writer. First he led the chess department in the newspaper Uusi Suomi, a year later he founded the chess magazine Suomen Shakki. The first editorial staff also included H. Hindstrom, E. Malmberg, A. Rautanen and J. Terho. In addition to materials on the chess life of Finland, in the early years of the magazine's existence, articles were published in it Emanuel Lasker and Siegbert Tarrasch.

Ilmari Rahm played for Finland in the Chess Olympiad:

- In 1930, at reserve board in the 3rd Chess Olympiad in Hamburg (+3, =3, -8).

In 1931, due to a sharp deterioration in health, Ilmari Rahm left the practical chess game and left all posts in the federation, club and magazine. The new editor of chess magazine Suomen Shakki was Eero Böök.
