= José Aguilera =

José Aguilera may refer to:

- José Aguilera (footballer) (born 2000), Chilean footballer
- José Manuel Aguilera (born 1959), Mexican guitar player, singer and composer
- José Aguilera Bernabé, Spanish chess player
- José Luis Aguilera Rico (born 1979), Mexican politician
