= 1903 in chess =

Events in chess in 1903:

== News ==
- Siegbert Tarrasch (Germany) wins the Monte Carlo tournament, ahead of Géza Maróczy (Hungary), Harry Pillsbury (United States), Carl Schlechter (Austria), and Richard Teichmann (Germany).
- Mikhail Chigorin wins the 3rd All-Russian Championship in Kiev, ahead of Ossip Bernstein.
- Chigorin (Russia) also wins the Vienna tournament, ahead of Frank Marshall (United States), Georg Marco (Romania), and Pillsbury. All games in this gambit tournament begin with the King's Gambit.
- The American team wins the Anglo-American cable match by the score 5½–4½. Pillsbury and Marshall are in Europe to play at the Monte Carlo tournament, so they travel to London to play their games in person.

== Births ==
- Tihomil Drezga (1903–1981) born in Šibenik, Croatia
- Henryk Friedman (1903–1942), Polish master
- Gisela Harum (1903–1995), Austrian chess master
- Menachem Oren (1903–1962) born in Różana, Poland
- Karol Piltz (1903–1939), Polish chess master.
- Solomon Gotthilf (1903–1967), Russian master
- January 1 – Kola Kwariani (1903–1980) professional wrestler, is born in Kutaisi, Georgia
- February 28 – Ozren Nedeljković (1903–1984), Serbian master, is born in Sremski Karlovci
- March 20 – Vitaly Halberstadt (1903–1967), French endgame study composer, is born in Odesa
- March 29 – Heinrich Reinhardt (1903–1990), German–Argentine master, is born in Stettin
- April 1 – Salo Landau (1903–1943), Dutch player, who died in a Nazi concentration camp is born in Bochnia, Galicia, Austria-Hungary
- April 9 – Morris Schapiro (1903–1996), American investment banker and chess master, is born in Lithuania
- April 17 [O.S. April 4] 1903 Gregor Piatigorsky (1903–1976), Russian-American cellist and chess patron, is born in Dnipropetrovsk
- June 14 – Lajos Steiner (1903–1975), Hungarian and Australian International Master (1950), is born in Nagyvárad
- August 4 Karl Ruben (date of death unknown), Danish master
- August 21 – William Fairhurst (1903–1982), British and New Zealand International Master (1951), is born in Alderley Edge
- August 25 – Arpad Elo (1903–1992), Hungarian-American player and inventor of the Elo rating system, is born in Egyházaskesző, Austria-Hungary
- September 17 – George Koltanowski (1903–2000), Belgian and American chess player, is born in Antwerp
- September 27 Boruch Israel Dyner (1903–1979) was a Belgian–Israeli chess master
- October 8 – Georgy Geshev(1903–1937), Bulgarian master, is born in Sofia
- December 20 – Ramón Rey Ardid (1903–1988), Spanish master and Spanish champion from 1929 to 1943.

== Deaths ==
- February 26 – Samuel Tinsley (1847–1903), English player and chess columnist for The Times, competed at Hastings 1895, dies in London.
- June 1 – Josef Noa (1856–1903), Hungarian master, dies in Budapest at age 46.
- August 8 – Gyula Makovetz (1860–1903), Hungarian chess player and editor of the chess magazine Budapesti Sakkszemle, dies in Budapest.
