= Miguel Muñoz (disambiguation) =

Miguel Muñoz (1922–1990) was a Spanish football midfielder and manager.

Miguel Muñoz may also refer to:

- Miguel Muñoz Trophy, football award for team managers in Spanish football
- Hoyos de Miguel Muñoz, municipality in province of Ávila, Spain
- Miguel Muñoz (bishop) (died 1553), Spanish Roman Catholic prelate
- Miguel Muñoz Pantoja (born 1975), Peruvian chess Grandmaster
- Miguel Ángel Muñoz (born 1983), Spanish actor and singer
- Miki Muñoz (born 1995), Spanish football midfielder for Burgos
- Miguel Muñoz (footballer, born 1996), Spanish football centre-back for Botoșani
