= Juhani =

Juhani is a common Finnish male given name and Arabic surname.

== Given name ==
- Juhani Aaltonen (born 1935), Finnish jazz saxophonist and flautist
- Juhani Aataminpoika (1826–1854), Finnish serial killer
- Juhani Aho (1861–1921), Finnish author and journalist
- Juhani Alaranta (born 1948), Finnish Lutheran pastor
- Juhani Arajärvi (1867–1941), Finnish politician
- Juhani Avellan (1945–2004), Finnish weightlifter
- Juhani Heinonen (born 1940), Finnish male curler and coach
- Juhani Helenius (1933–2010), Finnish canoeist
- Juhani Himanka (born 1956), Finnish footballer
- Juhani Järvinen (1935–1984), Finnish speed skater
- Juhani Jasu (born 1988), Finnish ice hockey player
- Juhani Kakkuri (1933–2022), Finnish geodesist
- Juhani Kangas (born 1998), Finnish footballer
- Johan Kankkonen (1886–1955), Finnish cyclist
- Juhani Karhumäki (born 1949), Finnish mathematician and theoretical computer scientist
- Juhani Kärkinen (1935–2019), Finnish ski jumper
- Juhani Kaskeala (b. 1946), Finnish admiral
- Juhani Keto (1947–2018), Finnish basketball player
- Juhani Komulainen (born 1953), Finnish composer
- Juhani Konkka (1904–1970), Finnish politician and journalist
- Juhani Kumpulainen (1925–1991), Finnish actor and director
- Juhani Kyöstilä (1931–2010), Finnish basketball player
- Juhani Laakso (1942–2014), Finnish sports shooter
- Juhani Lagerspetz (born 1959), Finnish pianist
- Juhani Lahtinen (1938–2018), Finnish ice hockey player
- Juhani Leppälä (1880–1976), Finnish schoolteacher, farmer and politician
- Juhani "Juice" Leskinen (1950–2006), Finnish musician
- Johannes Linnankoski (1869–1913), Finnish author and playwright
- Juhani Manninen (born 1941), Finnish long jumper
- Juhani Markola (1942–2025), Finnish singer
- Juhani Ojala (born 1989), Finnish footballer
- Juhani Olamo (1940–2010), Finnish philatelist
- Juhani Orrenmaa (1939–2023), Finnish schoolteacher and politician
- Juhani Paasivirta (1919–1993), Finnish historian
- Juhani Pallasmaa (born 1936), Finnish architect
- Juhani Peltonen (born 1936), Finnish footballer
- Juhani Pikkarainen (born 1998), Finnish footballer
- Juhani Rahikainen (born 1944), Finnish gymnast
- Juhani Repo (born 1948), Finnish cross-country skier
- Juhani Ruotsalainen (1948–2015), Finnish ski jumper
- Juhani Salakka (1950–2015), Finnish weightlifter
- Juhani Salmenkylä (1932–2022), Finnish orienteering competitor
- Juhani Salovaara (1931–2023), Finnish sailor
- Juhani Seppovaara (born 1947), Finnish photographer, illustrator, and writer
- Juhani Siljo (1888–1918), Finnish poet and translator
- Kari Juhani Sorri (1941–2024), Finnish chess player
- Kari Juhani Sorri (1941–2024), Finnish chess player
- Juhani Suutarinen (born 1943), Finnish biathlete
- Juhani Tamminen (ice hockey, born 1989), Finnish ice hockey player
- Juhani Tyrväinen (born 1990), Finnish ice hockey player
- Juhani Vellamo (1912–2004), Finnish weightlifter
- Juhani Wahlsten (1938–2019), Finnish ice hockey player and coach
- Juhani Wallenius (1956–2014), Finnish ice hockey player
- Hella Wuolijoki (1886–1954), Estonian-born Finnish writer

== Surname ==
- Khalid al-Juhani, Saudi al-Qaeda member
- Ma'bad al-Juhani, Islamic figure

== Fictional characters ==
- Juhani (Star Wars), a female playable character featured in Star Wars: Knights of the Old Republic.
- Juhani Otso Berg, a major antagonist in the modern day plotline of the Assassin's Creed series.
