= 2nd Chess Olympiad =

1928 chess tournament in The Hague, Netherlands

The 2nd Chess Olympiad (Dutch: De 2e Schaakolympiade), organized by the Fédération Internationale des Échecs (FIDE) and comprising a team tournament, as well as several events designed to promote the game of chess, took place between July 21 and August 6, 1928, in The Hague, Netherlands. The venue was the Ridderzaal, part of the Binnenhof, where the Dutch parliament resides.

== Results ==
=== Team standings ===
#	Country	Players	Points
1	Hungary	Nagy, Steiner, E., Vajda, Havasi	44
2	United States	Kashdan, Steiner, H., Factor, Tholfsen, Hanauer	39½
3	Poland	Makarczyk, Frydman, Regedziński, Chwojnik, Blass	37
4	Austria	Hönlinger, Lokvenc, Müller, Wolf, Beutum	36½
5	Denmark	Norman-Hansen, Andersen, Gemzøe, Ruben	34
6	Switzerland	Rivier, Gygli, Voellmy, Naegeli, Henneberger M., Michel	34
7	Czechoslovakia	Gilg, Prokeš, Pokorný, Rejfíř, Schulz, Teller	34
8	Argentina	Fernández Coria, Maderna, Palau, Reca, Grau	33½
9	Germany	Wagner, Hilse, Schönmann, Blümich, Foerder	31½
10	Netherlands	Weenink, Kroone, Van den Bosch, Schelfhout, Wertheim W., Wertheim J.	31½
11	France	Gaudin, Betbeder, Duchamp, Crépeaux, Muffang, Drezga	31
12	Belgium	Sapira, Koltanowski, Censer I., Dunkelblum	31
13	Sweden	Stoltz, Jacobson, Ståhlberg, Karlin, Jonsson	31
14	Latvia	Apšenieks, Strautmanis, Petrovs, Taube, Melnbārdis	30
15	Italy	Monticelli, Sacconi, Hellmann, Calapso, De Nardo, Marotti	26½
16	Romania	Bródy, Proca, Balogh, Gudju	25½
17	Spain	Marín y Llovet, Cortes, Aguilera, Ribera, Molla	13½

=== Team results ===
Place	Country	1	2	3	4	5	6	7	8	9	10	11	12	13	14	15	16	17	+	−	=	Points
1	Hungary	-	1½	3	2	3½	2½	1½	3	3½	3	3	2½	2	2½	3	3½	4	12	2	2	44
2	United States	2½	-	1	3½	3½	2	2	1½	3	3	2	3	2½	2	2	3	3	9	2	5	39½
3	Poland	1	3	-	1½	2	3	1	2½	2	3	2½	2½	2½	2	2	2½	4	9	3	4	37
4	Austria	2	½	2½	-	3	1	2	2	3	2	1	3	3	3½	3	1½	3½	8	4	4	36½
5	Denmark	½	½	2	1	-	1	1½	3	1½	3	4	3	2½	3	2½	2	3	8	6	2	34
6	Switzerland	1½	2	1	3	3	-	2½	1½	1½	1	1½	2	2	1	2½	4	4	6	7	3	34
7	Czechoslovakia	2½	2	3	2	2½	1½	-	1	1½	2	2½	1½	2	2	2½	1½	4	6	5	5	34
8	Argentina	1	2½	1½	2	1	2½	3	-	1½	1½	3	1½	3	3	1½	3	2	7	7	2	33½
9	Germany	½	1	2	1	2½	2½	2½	2½	-	2	1½	2	1½	1½	2	3½	3	6	6	4	31½
10	Netherlands	1	1	1	2	1	3	2	2½	2	-	1	2½	1	3	2½	3	3	7	6	3	31½
11	France	1	2	1½	3	0	2½	1½	1	2½	3	-	2	2	3	1½	1½	3	6	7	3	31
12	Belgium	1½	1	1½	1	1	2	2½	2½	2	1½	2	-	2	2½	2½	3	2½	6	6	4	31
13	Sweden	2	1½	1½	1	1½	2	2	1	2½	3	2	2	-	3	1½	1	3½	4	7	5	31
14	Latvia	1½	2	2	½	1	3	2	1	2½	1	1	1½	1	-	3½	3½	3	5	8	3	30
15	Italy	1	2	2	1	1½	1½	1½	2½	2	1½	2½	1½	2½	½	-	1½	1½	3	10	3	26½
16	Romania	½	1	1½	2½	2	0	2½	1	½	1	2½	1	3	½	2½	-	3½	6	9	1	25½
17	Spain	0	1	0	½	1	0	0	2	1	1	1	1½	½	1	2½	½	-	1	14	1	13½

=== Individual medals ===
No board order was applied and only top six individual results were awarded with a prize.

- Gold medal winner – Isaac Kashdan (United States), scoring 13/15 (86.7%);
- Silver medal winner – André Muffang (France), scoring 12½/16 (78.1%);
- Bronze medal winner – Teodor Regedziński (Poland), scoring 10/13 (76.9%);
- 4–5th place – Endre Steiner (Hungary), scoring 11½/16 (71.9%);
- 4–5th place – Géza Nagy (Hungary), scoring 11½/16 (71.9%);
- 6th place – William Rivier (Switzerland), scoring 7½/11 (68.2%).

=== Amateur World Championship ===
The second Amateur World Championship took place during the Olympiad. The final results were as follows:

#	Player	Points	Berger System
1	Max Euwe (Netherlands)	12	
2	Dawid Przepiórka (Poland)	11	
3	Hermanis Matisons (Latvia)	10	
4	Manuel Golmayo Torriente (Spain)	9½	66.25
5	Karel Treybal (Czechoslovakia)	9½	64.50
6	Norman Whitaker (United States)	9½	57.25
7	Carl Carls (Germany)	9	
8	Albert Becker (Austria)	7	
9	André Chéron (France)	6	47.00
10	Allan Nilsson (Sweden)	6	41.75
11	Stefano Rosselli del Turco (Italy)	6	36.50
12	Lajos Steiner (Hungary)	5½	36.00
13	José Araiza (Mexico)	5½	35.75
14	Anatol Tschepurnoff (Finland)	5½	31.75
15	Alexandru Tyroler (Romania)	5	
16	Walter Henneberger (Switzerland)	3	
