= 3rd Chess Olympiad =

1930 chess tournament in Hamburg, Germany

The Polish gold medalists: Frydman, Tartakower (1st and 2nd from the left), Rubinstein (centre), Makarczyk, and Przepiórka (2nd and 3rd from the right).

The 3rd Chess Olympiad (German: Die 3. Schacholympiade), organized by FIDE and comprising a team tournament, took place between July 13 and July 27, 1930, in Hamburg, Germany. The 2nd Women's World Chess Championship also took place during the Olympiad.

== Results ==
=== Team standings ===
#	Country	Players	Points
1	Poland	Rubinstein, Tartakower, Przepiórka, Makarczyk, Frydman	48½
2	Hungary	Maróczy, Takács, Vajda, Havasi, Steiner E.	47
3	Germany	Ahues, Sämisch, Carls, Richter, Wagner	44½
4	Austria	Kmoch, Müller, Eliskases, Lokvenc, Wolf	43½
5	Czechoslovakia	Flohr, Treybal K., Rejfíř, Prokeš, Pokorný	42½
6	United States	Kashdan, Marshall, Phillips, Steiner H., Anderson	41½
7	Netherlands	Weenink, Van den Bosch, Noteboom, Landau, Schelfhout	41
8	Great Britain	Sultan Khan, Yates, Thomas, Winter, Tylor	40½
9	Sweden	Ståhlberg, Berndtsson, Stoltz, Lundin, Jacobson	40
10	Latvia	Apšenieks, Petrovs, Feigins, Taube	35
11	Denmark	Andersen, Ruben, Desler, Olsen, Gemzøe	31
12	France	Alekhine, Betbeder, Gromer, Duchamp, Voisin	28½
13	Romania	Baratz, Balogh, Tyroler, Taubmann, Gudju	28½
14	Lithuania	Machtas, Šeinbergas, Vistaneckis, Abramavičius, Kolodnas	22½
15	Iceland	Gilfer, Ásgeirsson, Thorvaldsson, Guðmundsson	22
16	Spain	Marín y Llovet, Golmayo Torriente, Lafora, Ribera, Soler	21½
17	Finland	Rasmusson, Krogius, Larsen, Gauffin, Rahm	18
18	Norway	Olsen, Hovind, Kavlie-Jørgensen, Krogdahl, Halvorsen	16

=== Team results ===
Place	Country	1	2	3	4	5	6	7	8	9	10	11	12	13	14	15	16	17	18	+	−	=	Points
1	Poland	-	3½	2	2	1½	2	1½	3	4	2½	2½	3½	3	2½	4	4	3½	3½	12	2	3	48½
2	Hungary	½	-	2	2	1½	3	1½	2	2	3	3½	3½	3½	4	4	4	4	3	10	3	4	47
3	Germany	2	2	-	3	2	½	1½	3	3	3½	3½	3	2½	3½	2	2½	3	4	11	2	4	44½
4	Austria	2	2	1	-	2	4	2	1½	2	3½	3	3	2	3	3½	2	3	4	8	2	7	43½
5	Czechoslovakia	2½	2½	2	2	-	2	½	2½	3½	1	2	3½	2½	2	4	3	3½	3½	10	2	5	42½
6	United States	2	1	3½	0	2	-	2½	2	2	2½	2½	1½	2½	3½	3	3	4	4	10	3	4	41½
7	Netherlands	2½	2½	2½	2	3½	1½	-	1½	1½	1½	3	3	3½	1	2½	3	4	2	10	5	2	41
8	Great Britain	1	2	1	2½	1½	2	2½	-	2	3	2½	3½	2½	2	2½	3½	3	3½	10	3	4	40½
9	Sweden	0	2	1	2	½	2	2½	2	-	2	2½	3	3	3½	3½	3	3½	4	9	3	5	40
10	Latvia	1½	1	½	½	3	1½	2½	1	2	-	1	2	3	3	4	3	2	3½	7	7	3	35
11	Denmark	1½	½	½	1	2	1½	1	1½	1½	3	-	2	2	1	3	2½	2½	4	5	9	3	31
12	France	½	½	1	1	½	2½	1	½	1	2	2	-	2½	3½	1½	3	3	2½	6	9	2	28½
13	Romania	1	½	1½	2	1½	1½	½	1½	1	1	2	1½	-	1	3½	3½	2½	2½	4	11	2	28½
14	Lithuania	1½	0	½	1	2	½	3	2	½	1	3	½	3	-	0	1	1	2	3	11	3	22½
15	Iceland	0	0	2	½	0	1	1½	1½	½	0	1	2½	½	4	-	1	3½	2½	4	12	1	22
16	Spain	0	0	1½	2	1	1	1	½	1	1	1½	1	½	3	3	-	2	1½	2	13	2	21½
17	Finland	½	0	1	1	½	0	0	1	½	2	1½	1	1½	3	½	2	-	2	1	13	3	18
18	Norway	½	1	0	0	½	0	2	½	0	½	0	1½	1½	2	1½	2½	2	-	1	13	3	16

=== Individual medals ===
The individual ratings were solely based on number of points scored. No board order was applied and only top three individual results were awarded with a prize.

- Gold medal won Akiba Rubinstein (Poland), scoring 15/17 (88.2%);
- Silver medal won Salo Flohr (Czechoslovakia), scoring 14.5/17 (85.3%);
- Bronze medal won Isaac Kashdan (USA), scoring 14/17 (82.4%).
