= 1st Chess Olympiad =

1927 chess tournament in London, England

Players and spectators at the Westminster Central Hall

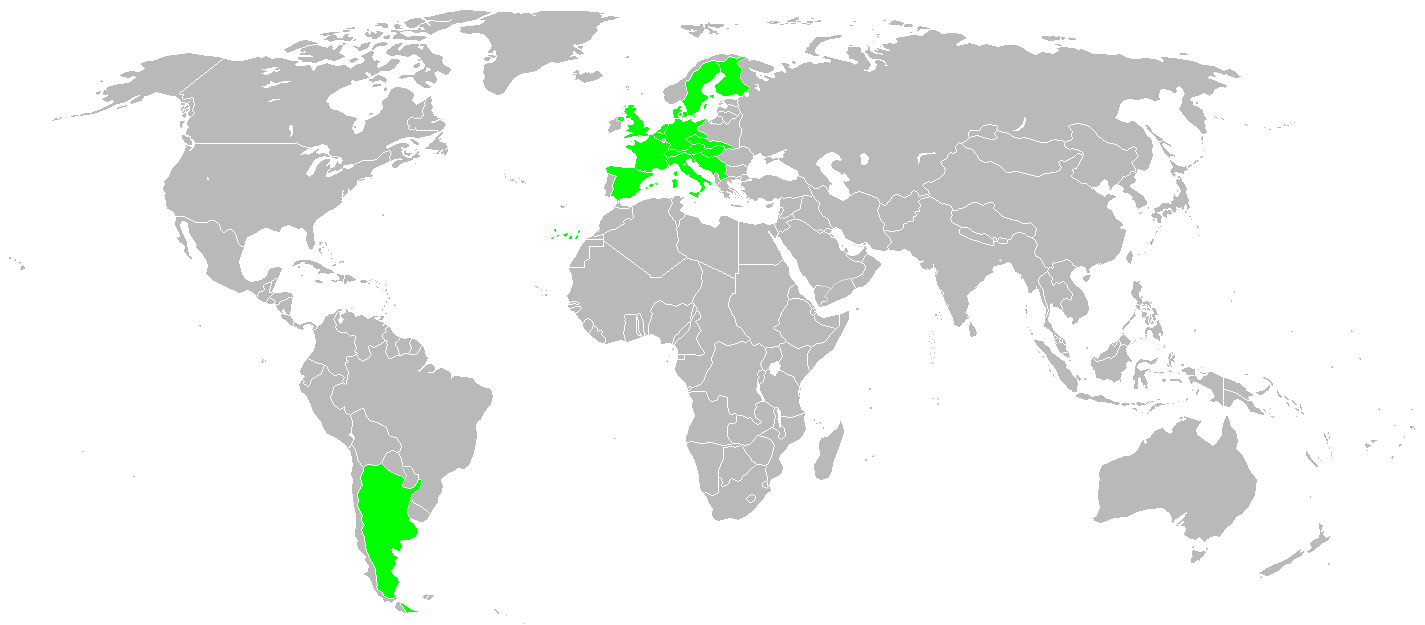
Competing countries (in green) of the 1st Chess Olympiad

The 1st Chess Olympiad, organized by FIDE and comprising a team tournament, as well as several events designed to promote the game of chess, took place between 18 and 30 July, 1927 at the Westminster Central Hall, London, United Kingdom. It was officially known by its current name from 1952. The 1st Women's World Chess Championship also took place during the time of the olympiad.

== Teams & Players ==
16 participating teams constituting a total of 70 players participated in the event. All of the teams except Argentina were from Europe.

Each team had 4 players and some teams even had a reserve player.

== Rounds & Games ==
The event was played in a round robin format. 15 rounds were played throughout the 12-day span of the event, each played at 2:30. Four extra rounds were played on four days at 9:30.

480 games were played in the event between the players of different teams. The teams could choose in which order they would give the board number to the participants unlike today's system of board numbers given by player strength.

The players played in a classical time control of 90 minutes for 30 moves and then 30 minutes for every 10 moves after.

== Results ==
=== Team standings ===
#	Country	Players	Points
1	Hungary	Maróczy, Nagy, Vajda, Havasi, Steiner E.	40
2	Denmark	Krause, Norman-Hansen, Andersen, Ruben	38½
3	Great Britain	Atkins, Yates, Thomas, Michell, Spencer	36½
4	Netherlands	Euwe, Weenink, Kroone, te Kolsté, Schelfhout	35
5	Czechoslovakia	Réti, Gilg, Hromádka, Pokorný, Prokeš	34½
6	Germany	Tarrasch, Mieses, Carls, Wagner	34
7	Austria	Grünfeld, Lokvenc, Kmoch, Wolf, Gruber	34
8	Switzerland	Johner H., Naegeli, Zimmermann, Grob, Michel	32
9	Kingdom of Serbs, Croats and Slovenes	Kostić, Vuković V., Asztalos, Kalabar	30
10	Italy	Rosselli del Turco, Monticelli, Romih, Sacconi	28½
11	Sweden	Nilsson, Nyholm, Jakobson, Stoltz	28
12	Argentina	Grau, Rivarola, Nogués Acuña, Palau	27
13	France	Chéron, Muffang, Renaud, Betbeder	24½
14	Finland	Tschepurnoff, Rasmusson, Heilimo, Terho	21½
15	Belgium	Koltanowski, Censer I., Louviau, Censer M.	21½
16	Spain	Golmayo, Marín y Llovet, Vilardebó, Soler	14½

=== Team results ===
Place	Country	1	2	3	4	5	6	7	8	9	10	11	12	13	14	15	16	+	−	=	Points
1	Hungary	-	1	2½	1½	3	3	3	1½	4	3	1½	3½	3	2½	3½	3½	11	4	0	40
2	Denmark	3	-	2½	2	3½	2½	1½	2½	1	2	2½	3	3	3½	2	4	10	2	3	38½
3	Great Britain	1½	1½	-	3	1½	2½	1½	3	3½	2	3½	2½	2½	2	3	3	9	4	2	36½
4	Netherlands	2½	2	1	-	3	2	2½	1½	2	3½	4	2	1	3½	2	2½	7	3	5	35
5	Czechoslovakia	1	½	2½	1	-	2½	1½	2½	2½	2½	1	4	2½	3	3½	4	10	5	0	34½
6	Germany	1	1½	1½	2	1½	-	2	3	2½	2½	3	2½	2½	3	2½	3	9	4	2	34
7	Austria	1	2½	2½	1½	2½	2	-	1½	3	1½	2½	2½	3	3½	1½	3	9	5	1	34
8	Switzerland	2½	1½	1	2½	1½	1	2½	-	2	1½	2½	1½	2	3½	3½	3	7	6	2	32
9	Kingdom of Serbs, Croats and Slovenes	0	3	½	2	1½	1½	1	2	-	2½	3	1½	3½	3	2	3	6	6	3	30
10	Italy	1	2	2	½	1½	1½	2½	2½	1½	-	1	2½	2	3	3	2	5	6	4	28½
11	Sweden	2½	1½	½	0	3	1	1½	1½	1	3	-	1½	4	3	1½	2½	6	9	0	28
12	Argentina	½	1	1½	2	0	1½	1½	2½	2½	1½	2½	-	1½	2	3	3½	5	8	2	27
13	France	1	1	1½	3	1½	1½	1	2	½	2	0	2½	-	1	3	3	4	9	2	24½
14	Finland	1½	½	2	½	1	1	½	½	1	1	1	2	3	-	2½	3½	3	10	2	21½
15	Belgium	½	2	1	2	½	1½	2½	½	2	1	2½	1	1	1½	-	2	2	9	4	21½
16	Spain	½	0	1	1½	0	1	1	1	1	2	1½	½	1	½	2	-	0	13	2	14½

=== Individual medals ===
No board order was applied and only top six individual results were awarded with a prize.

#	Player	Points	Percentage
1	George Alan Thomas (England)	12/15	80%
1	Holger Norman-Hansen (Denmark)	12/15	80%
3	Richard Réti (Czechoslovakia)	11½/15	76.7%
4	Géza Maróczy (Hungary)	9/12	75%
5	Ernst Grünfeld (Austria)	9½/13	73.1%
6	Max Euwe (Netherlands)	10½/15	70%
