= Lafora =

Lafora is a surname. Notable people with the surname include:

- Alfredo de Zavala y Lafora (1893–1995), Spanish lawyer
- Carlos Rodríguez Lafora (1884–1966), Spanish chess player and chess composer
- Gonzalo Rodríguez Lafora (1886–1971), Spanish neurologist

== See also ==
- Lafora disease, genetic disorder
