= Rivarola =

Surname

Rivarola is a surname. Notable people with the surname include:

- Agostino Rivarola (1758-1627), Roman Catholic Cardinal
- Alfonso Rivarola (1607–1640), Italian painter of the Renaissance period
- Camila Rivarola (born 1989), Uruguayan MMA fighter, model and sports commentator
- Catalino Rivarola (born 1965), former football defender from Paraguay
- Cirilo Antonio Rivarola (1836–1879), President of Paraguay, March 1, 1870 – December 10, 1871
- Diego Rivarola (born 1976), Argentine footballer
- Eduardo Airaldi Rivarola (1922–1992), Peruvian basketball player, coach, referee and administrator
- Germán Rivarola (born 1979), Argentine footballer
- Guillermo Rivarola (born 1967), Argentine retired footballer
- José María Rivarola Matto, (1917–1998), son of Octaviano Rivarola Bogarín and Victoriana Matto
- Juan Bautista Rivarola Matto (1933–1999), Paraguayan journalist, narrator, essayist and playwright
- Juan Manuel Rivarola (1899–1985), Argentine chess player
- Maria Rivarola (born 1957), Argentine tango dancer
