= MacIsaac =

MacIsaac is a surname. Notable people with the surname include:

- Angus MacIsaac (born 1943), English educator and businessman
- Angus MacIsaac (footballer) (1900-1944) Australian rules footballer
- Ashley MacIsaac (born 1975), Canadian fiddler
- Dave MacIsaac (born 1955), Canadian musician
- Dugald MacIsaac (1901-1961), Scottish chess player
- Kevin MacIsaac, Canadian zoologist
- Martha MacIsaac (born 1984), Canadian actress
- Veronica MacIsaac, Canadian fashion designer who specialises in tartan
