= Ángel Ribera Arnal =

Spanish chess player

Personal information
- Born: 13 March 1909 Barcelona, Spain
- Died: 13 February 2002 (aged 92) Cabrils, Spain

Chess career
- Country: Spain

Ángel Ribera Arnal (Catalan: Àngel Ribera i Arnal; 13 March 1909 – 13 February 2002) was a Spanish chess player, Spanish Chess Championship silver medalist (1958), Catalan Chess Championship winner (1933).

== Biography ==
For over 30 years Ribera was one of the strongest chess players in Spain. In 1935, he ranked 2nd in Spanish National Tournament (the winner received the right to a match with the current champion of the country). Ribera was participant in international chess tournaments in Sitges (1934) and Barcelona (1929 and 1935). In 1933, he won Catalan Chess Championship and ranked 2nd in this tournament in 1928 and 1958. Ribera was a winner of the chess tournament in Santander and the silver medalist of the tournament in Berga (both in 1951). At the tournament in Berga, he only behind the winner Albéric O'Kelly de Galway and ahead of Nicolas Rossolimo, Arturo Pomar, Antonio Medina García, Jaime Lladó Lumbera and other. In 1958, Ángel Ribera Arnal won silver medal in Spanish Chess Championship. He was seven-time Spanish Senior Chess Championships winner (1975, 1977-1982).

Ribera played for Spain in the Chess Olympiads:

- In 1928, at fourth board in the 2nd Chess Olympiad in The Hague (+2, =3, -11),
- In 1930, at fourth board in the 3rd Chess Olympiad in Hamburg (+2, =6, -7).

In 1979, he was awarded the silver badge of honor from the Catalan Chess Federation.
