= Melnbārdis =

Melnbārdis (feminine: Melnbārde) is a Latvian surname. Notable people with the surname include:

- Alberts Melnbārdis (1888–1957), Latvian chess player
- Armands Melnbārdis, Latvian-born musician and recording artist
