= Lumbera =

Lumbera is a surname. Notable people with the surname include:

- Bienvenido Lumbera (1932–2021), Filipino poet, critic and dramatist
- Jaime Lladó Lumbera (1916–?), Spanish chess player
