= FCCF =

FCCF may refer to:

- Finnish Correspondence Chess Federation
- Fédération culturelle canadienne-française, see French Canadian
- Flow cytometry core facility (used in many universities)
