= Lladó (surname) =

Lladó is a surname. Notable people with the surname include:

- Jaime Lladó Lumbera (1916–?), Spanish chess player
- José Lladó Fernández-Urrutia (1934–2024), Spanish politician and businessman
- Juan Lladó (1918–1956), Spanish screenwriter and film director
