= Krogius =

Krogius is a surname. Notable people with the surname include:

- Ernst Krogius (1865–1955), Finnish sailor
- Nikolai Krogius (1930–2022), Russian chess player and referee
- Ragnar Krogius (1903–1980), Finnish chess player
