= Terho =

Terho is a Finnish surname, which may refer to:

- Casper Terho (born 2003), Finnish footballer
- Emma Terho (born 1981), Finnish retired ice hockey defenseman
- Johannes Terho (1885–1961), Finnish chess player
- Olga Terho (1910–2003), Finnish politician
- Sampo Terho (born 1977), Finnish politician
