= José Luís Fernández García =

Spanish chess grandmaster (born 1954)

José Luis Fernández García
Personal information
- Born: May 3, 1954 (age 72) Portugalete, Biscay, Spain

Chess career
- Country: Spain
- Title: Grandmaster (1986)
- Peak rating: 2500 (July 1990)

José Luis Fernández García (born 3 May 1954) is a Spanish chess Grandmaster. He was awarded the Grandmaster title by FIDE in 1986.

== Chess career ==
Fernández García won the Spanish Chess Championship in 1989, finishing ahead of Grandmaster Juan Manuel Bellón López. He finished as runner-up on five occasions: 1976 (behind Ángel Martín González), 1977 (behind Juan Manuel Bellón López), 1978 (behind Manuel Rivas Pastor), 1985 (behind Jesús María de la Villa García), and 1995 (behind Miguel Illescas). In 2001, he won the 1st Spanish Open Individual Championship in Manacor.

In 1982, he won the Catalonia Chess Championship.

Representing Spain, Fernández García competed in six Chess Olympiads: Lucerne 1982, Thessaloniki 1984, Dubai 1986, Thessaloniki 1988, Novi Sad 1990, and Manila 1992. He also represented Spain at the 1992 European Team Chess Championship in Debrecen.
