= Eric Jonsson =

Swedish chess player

Personal information
- Born: 1 October 1903
- Died: 1974 (aged 70–71)

Chess career
- Country: Sweden

Eric Jonsson (1 October 1903 – 1974) was a Swedish chess player.

== Biography ==
Eric Jonsson was one of Sweden’s strongest chess players in the 1920s and 1930s. He was six-time Gothenburg chess champion (1925, 1926, 1928, 1935, 1936 and 1942). In 1937, Eric Jonsson played a small demonstration match with Reuben Fine (as part of the tour of the American chess grandmaster in Sweden) - ½: 1½. In 1948, with the Swedish national team, he participated in a number of international chess matches with the teams of Denmark and Norway.

Eric Jonsson has played for Sweden in the Chess Olympiads:

- In 1928, at reserve board in the 2nd Chess Olympiad in The Hague (+2, =7, -5),
- In 1937, at reserve board in the 7th Chess Olympiad in Stockholm (+2, =5, -4).
