= Ernst Jacobson =

Swedish chess player

Ernst Jacobson (31 January 1889, in Stockholm – 8 February 1963, in Stockholm) was a Swedish chess master.

He took 8th at Copenhagen 1916 (the 9th Nordic Chess Championship, Paul Johner won), took 2nd at Stockholm 1916, tied for 7-8th at Göteborg 1920 (B-tournament, Johner won), took 3rd and won ahead of Karl Berndtsson and Gustaf Nyholm at Jönköping 1921, and took 4th at Uppsala 1923 (Allan Nilsson and Anton Olson won).

He thrice represented Sweden in Chess Olympiads at London 1927, The Hague 1928, and Hamburg 1930, and played in friendly matches Germany vs. Sweden (1922) and Stockholm vs. Leningrad (1926).
