= Sadi Kalabar =

Yugoslav chess player (1901–1960)

Personal information
- Born: 18 February 1901
- Died: 23 July 1960 (aged 59)

Chess career
- Country: Yugoslavia

Sadi Kalabar (18 February 1901 – 23 July 1960) was a Croatian origin Yugoslav chess player.

== Biography ==
Sadi Kalabar played for Yugoslavia in the Chess Olympiad:

- In 1927, at fourth board in the 1st Chess Olympiad in London (+5, =1, -9).

In this Chess Olympiad he made one of the most ridiculous blunder in the history of chess: in the game with the Argentine chess player Palau after moves 1. d4 Nf6 2. c4 e6 3. Nf3 Bb4+ 4. Bd2 Sadi Kalabar wanted to play 4 ... Qe7, but instead of the queen he rearranged the king on the e7 square (4 ... Ke7) and after the answer 5. Bxb4+ passed the game.

Sadi Kalabar also participated in the Yugoslav Chess Championship in 1946 and shared 18th - 19th place (+4, =6, −9).
