= Arsène Louviau =

Belgian chess player

Personal information
- Born: 8 November 1898
- Died: 1964 (aged 65–66)

Chess career
- Country: Belgium

Arsène Louviau (8 November 1898 – 1964) was a Belgian chess player.

== Biography ==
Arsène Louviau was one of Belgium's leading chess players from to the late 1910s to the late 1920s. In 1919, in Brussels he participated in National Chess Tournament. In 1921, in Brussels Arsène Louviau participated in 1st Belgian Chess Congress and ranked in 5th place.

Arsène Louviau played for Belgium in the Chess Olympiad:

- In 1927, at third board in the 1st Chess Olympiad in London (+2, =5, -8).
