= Catalan Chess Championship =

List of winners of the Catalan Chess Championship

This is a list of the winners of the Catalan Chess Championship.

== Championship winners ==
Nr	Year	Men's winner
1	1905	Fernando Canon
2	1914	Josep Puntas
3	1921	Dr. Esteve Puig i Puig
4	1923	Lluís G. Cortes
5	1924	Plàcid Soler
6	1926	Josep Vilardebó
7	1928	Josep Vilardebó
8	1931	Plàcid Soler
9	1933	Angel Ribera
10	1935	Josep Vilardebó
11	1943	Miquel Albareda
12	1944	Rafael Llorens
13	1945	Rafael Albareda
14	1946	Rafael Llorens
15	1947	Antoni Medina
16	1948	Romà Bordell
17	1949	Antoni Medina
18	1950	Antoni Medina
19	1951	Jaume Lladó
20	1952	Jaume Lladó
21	1953	Romà Bordell
22	1954	Miquel Albareda
23	1955	Jaume Lladó
24	1956	Jaume Lladó
25	1957	Miquel Albareda
26	1958	Miquel Albareda
27	1959	Miquel Albareda
28	1960	Joaquim Serra
29	1961	Pere Puig
30	1962	Miquel Albareda
31	1963	Miquel Albareda
32	1964	Romà Bordell
33	1965	Rafael Saborido
34	1966	Rafael Saborido
35	1967	Jaume Lladó
36	1968	Pere Puig
37	1969	Eduard Pérez
38	1970	Eduard Pérez
39	1971	Màxim Borrell
40	1972	Joaquim Serra
41	1973	Josep Monedero
42	1974	Angel Martín
43	1975	Emili Simón
44	1976	Fermí Tejero
45	1977	Jordi Ayza
46	1978	Jordi Ayza
47	1979	Angel Martín
48	1980	Angel Martín
49	1981	Xavier Mateu
50	1982	Josep Ll. Fernández
51	1983	Josep Ponce
52	1984	Angel Martín
53	1985	Joaquim Noria
54	1986	Josep M. Gil
55	1987	Antoni Gual
56	1988	Alexandre Pablo
57	1989	Alexandre Pablo
58	1990	Oscar de la Riva
59	1991	Josep Collado
60	1992	Oscar de la Riva
61	1992*	Marc Narciso
62	1993	Victor Vehí
63	1994	Antoni Torrecillas
64	1995	Marc Narciso
65	1996	Arturo Vidarte
66	1997	Angel Martín
67	1998	Victor Vehí
68	1999	Santiago Beltran
69	2000	Angel Martín
70	2001	Antoni Gual
71	2002	Alfonso Jerez
72	2003	Guillem Baches
73	2004	Manuel Granados
74	2005	Viktor Moskalenko
75	2006	Joan Anton Lacasa
76	2007	Viktor Moskalenko
77	2008	Jordi Magem Badals
78	2009	Jose Manuel Lopez
79	2010	Jordi Magem Badals
80	2011	Marc Narciso
81	2012	Miguel Angel Muñoz
82	2013	Orelbi Pérez
83	2014	Àlvar Alonso Rosell
84	2015	Hipólito Asís
85	2016	Àlvar Alonso Rosell
86	2017	Hipólito Asís
87	2018	Hipólito Asís

Note: In 1992, two championships were held.

== Women's winners ==
Nr	Year	Women's winner
1	1932	María Lluisa de Zengotita
2	1933	María Lluisa de Zengotita
3	1935	Gloria Velat
4	1936	Gloria Velat
5	1942	Gloria Velat
6	1943	Gloria Velat
7	1944	Dolors Camats
8	1946	Julia Maldonado
9	1949	Gloria Velat
10	1951	Sofia Ruiz
11	1952	Gloria Velat
12	1955	Ana Maria Navarro
13	1956	Pepita Ferrer
14	1957	Pepita Ferrer
15	1958	Pepita Ferrer
16	1959	Pepita Ferrer
17	1961	Lluisa Puget
18	1963	Julia Maldonado
19	1964	Maria Rosa Ribes
20	1965	Julia Maldonado, Maria Rosa Ribes
21	1966	Julia Maldonado
22	1967	Maria Rosa Ribes
23	1968	Maria Rosa Ribes
24	1969	Maria Rosa Ribes
25	1970	Maria Rosa Ribes
26	1971	Maria Rosa Ribes
27	1972	Maria Rosa Ribes
28	1973	Maria Rosa Ribes
29	1974	Maria Rosa Ribes
30	1975	Teresa Canela
31	1976	Teresa Canela
32	1977	Contxita Canela
33	1978	Teresa Canela
34	1979	Teresa Canela
35	1980	Contxita Canela
36	1981	Pepita Ferrer
37	1982	Teresa Canela
38	1983	Teresa Canela
39	1984	Teresa Canela
40	1985	Mónica Vilar
41	1986	Mónica Vilar
42	1987	Mónica Vilar
43	1988	Mónica Vilar
44	1989	Mónica Vilar
45	1990	Beatriz Alfonso
46	1991	Mónica Vilar
47	1992	Immaculada Hernando
48	1993	Dolors Antón
49	1994	Dolors Antón
50	1995	Mónica Vilar
51	1996	Beatriz Alfonso
52	1997	Roser Moix
53	1998	Immaculada Hernando
54	1999	Silvia Folch
55	2000	Clara Orriols
56	2001	Immaculada Hernando
57	2002	Immaculada Hernando
58	2003	Yolanda Peñas
59	2004	Laura García
60	2005	Isaura Sanjuan
61	2006	Ana Matnadze
62	2007	Alba Ventos
63	2008	Clara Orriols
64	2009	Mireia Terrones
65	2010	Carla Marín
66	2011	Elisabet Ruiz
67	2012	Beatriz Alfonso
68	2013	Elisabet Ruiz
69	2014	Elizabeth Riera Morilla
70	2015	Elizabeth Riera Morilla
71	2016	Elisabeth Riera Morilla
72	2017	
