= Edmund Spencer (chess player) =

English chess player

Personal information
- Born: 18 June 1876 Oxford, England
- Died: 7 January 1936 (aged 59) Liverpool, England

Chess career
- Country: England

Edmund Spencer (18 June 1876 – 7 January 1936) was an English chess player and Chess Olympiad team bronze medal winner (1927).

== Biography ==
Since 1900 Edmund Spencer was Manchester's chess club member. He participated in the British Chess Championship four times: 1924, 1925, 1928, 1931. In this tournament he achieved the best results in 1925, when won 3rd place behind Henry Ernest Atkins and Frederick Yates, and in 1931, when he ranked in 4th place. In 1924, in Weston, Edmund Spencer ranked 4th in the International Chess tournament, won by Max Euwe.

Edmund Spencer played for England in the Chess Olympiad:

- In 1927, at reserve board in the 1st Chess Olympiad in London (+2, =3, -1) and won team bronze medal.

He was the secretary and cashier of the Northern Counties Chess Union of England. After Spencer's death, the Northern Counties Chess Union Boys' Championship main prize was named after him Edmund Spencer Trophy.
