= André Muffang =

French chess player

André Muffang (25 July 1897 in Saint-Brieuc – 1 March 1989 in Paris) was a French chess master.

Before World War I, he took 3rd, behind Alexander Alekhine and Frank Marshall, at Paris 1914 (Quadrangular); took 5th at Lyon 1914 (2nd French Amateur championship, Alphonse Goetz won); and won at Paris 1914 (Café de la Régence championship).

After the war, he won at Paris 1922 (Triangular), took 2nd at Paris 1923 (Quadrangular), lost a mini match to Alekhine (0–2) at Paris 1923, tied for 2nd-5th at Margate 1923 (Ernst Grünfeld won), and shared 4th at Strasbourg 1924. He was French Champion in 1931.

Muffang represented France in Chess Olympiads:

- In the 1st Chess Olympiad at London 1927 (+3 –3 =9),
- In the 2nd Chess Olympiad at The Hague 1928 (+9 –0 =7),
- In the 6th Chess Olympiad at Warsaw 1935 (+4 –4 =9),
- In the 12th Chess Olympiad at Moscow 1956 (+3 –5 =7).

He won individual silver medal in The Hague.

After World War II, he played for France in friendly matches against Switzerland (1946), Czechoslovakia (1947), Soviet Union (1954), and Romania (1955).

He was awarded the International Master title in 1951.
