= Arvīds Tālavs =

Latvian chess player (1906–1992)

Personal information
- Born: 3 January 1906 Lazdona Parish, Russian Empire
- Died: 17 April 1992 (aged 86) Victoria, Canada

Chess career
- Country: Latvia; Canada

Arvīds Tālavs (before the change surname was Arvīds Taube; 3 January 1906 – 17 April 1992) was a Latvian chess player.

== Biography ==
Arvīds Tālavs (Taube) was born in the Lazdona Parish of the present Madona Municipality. In 1924 he graduated from the Second City Gymnasium in Riga. From 1924 to 1936 Arvīds Tālavs studied economics at the Faculty of National Economy and Law in University of Latvia.

He was a good chess player. Arvīds Tālavs played for Latvia in the Chess Olympiads:

- In 1928, at fourth board in the 2nd Chess Olympiad in The Hague (+3, =5, -7),
- In 1930, at fourth board in the 3rd Chess Olympiad in Hamburg (+4, =4, -9).

During World War II Arvīds Tālavs left Latvia. In 1944 Arvīds Tālavs moved to Germany, and in 1949 he emigrated to Australia, then he lived permanently in Canada until the end of his life.
