= Rafael Saborido Carné =

Spanish chess player (1927–2008)

Personal information
- Born: 21 May 1927
- Died: 4 June 2008 (aged 81)

Chess career
- Country: Spain
- Peak rating: 2300 (July 1971)

Rafael Saborido Carné or Rafael Saborido i Carné (21 May 1927 — 4 June 2008) was a Spanish chess player, four-times Spanish Chess Championship medalist (1948, 1960, 1963, 1968), two-times Catalan Chess Championship winner (1965, 1966).

== Biography ==
In the 1960s, Rafael Saborido Carné was among the best Spanish players. In 1948, 1960, 1963, and 1968, he won silver medal in the Spanish Chess Championship. Rafael Saborido Carné twice in row won Catalan Chess Championship: 1965 and 1966, and three times won silver medals in this tournaments: 1950, 1963, 1968. Rafael Saborido Carné repeatedly competed in international chess tournaments and won 3rd place in Málaga in 1966. In 1969 he participated in FIDE Zonal Chess tournament. He took part in the international tournament in Gijón in 1948, finishing in eighth position -The winner was Antonio Rico-

Rafael Saborido Carné played for Spain in the Chess Olympiad:

- In 1964, at second board in the 16th Chess Olympiad in Tel Aviv (+1, =2, -5).

Rafael Saborido Carné played for Spain in the European Team Chess Championship:

- In 1961, at third board in the 2nd European Team Chess Championship in Oberhausen (+0, =3, -6).
