= 5th Chess Olympiad =

1933 chess tournament in Folkestone, England

The 5th Chess Olympiad, organized by FIDE and comprising a team tournament, took place between June 12 and June 23, 1933, in Folkestone, United Kingdom. The 4th Women's World Chess Championship also took place during the Olympiad.

== Results ==
=== Team standings ===
#	Country	Players	Points
1	United States	Kashdan, Marshall, Fine, Dake, Simonson	39
2	Czechoslovakia	Flohr, Treybal K., Rejfíř, Opočenský, Skalička	37½
3	Sweden	Ståhlberg, Stoltz, Lundin, Berndtsson	34
4	Poland	Tartakower, Frydman, Regedziński, Appel, Makarczyk	34
5	Hungary	Maróczy, Steiner L., Vajda, Havasi, Lilienthal	34
6	Austria	Grünfeld, Eliskases, Glass, Müller, Igel	33½
7	Lithuania	Mikėnas, Vaitonis, Vistaneckis, Luckis, Abramavičius	30½
8	France	Alekhine, Betbeder, Kahn, Duchamp, Voisin	28
9	Latvia	Apšenieks, Petrovs, Feigins, Hasenfuss	27½
10	Great Britain	Sultan Khan, Thomas, Winter, Michell, Alexander	27
11	Italy	Rosselli del Turco, Monticelli, Sacconi, Norcia, Campolongo	24½
12	Denmark	Andersen, Enevoldsen, Gemzøe, Nielsen B., Nielsen J.	22½
13	Belgium	Soultanbeieff, Dunkelblum, Engelmann, Devos	17
14	Iceland	Ásgeirsson, Gilfer, Thorvaldsson, Sigurdsson	17
15	Scotland	Fairhurst, Page, MacIsaac, MacKenzie, Combe	14

The English team still went under the name of Great Britain, even though it only consisted of English players and Scotland participated with their own team.

Estonia was supposed to participate, but the team never showed up.

=== Team results ===
Place	Country	1	2	3	4	5	6	7	8	9	10	11	12	13	14	15	+	−	=	Points
1	United States	-	1½	1½	3	2½	3	4	3	3	3	2½	2	3	3½	3½	11	2	1	39
2	Czechoslovakia	2½	-	3	2½	½	2	2½	1½	2	3	3½	3½	3½	4	3½	10	2	2	37½
3	Sweden	2½	1	-	2	2½	1½	2	3½	1½	2½	2½	3½	3½	2½	3	9	3	2	34
4	Poland	1	1½	2	-	2½	2½	2	2½	2½	2	2	3½	2½	4	3½	8	2	4	34
5	Hungary	1½	3½	1½	1½	-	2	1½	2½	3½	2	2½	2½	3	3	3½	8	4	2	34
6	Austria	1	2	2½	1½	2	-	2½	2½	3	2½	2	3½	3	2½	3	9	2	3	33½
7	Lithuania	0	1½	2	2	2½	1½	-	2½	3	2½	2	2½	4	2	2½	7	3	4	30½
8	France	1	2½	½	1½	1½	1½	1½	-	3	2½	1½	2½	2½	2½	3½	7	7	0	28
9	Latvia	1	2	2½	1½	½	1	1	1	-	2½	3	2½	2½	3	3½	7	6	1	27½
10	Great Britain	1	1	1½	2	2	1½	1½	1½	1½	-	3	3½	1½	2	3½	3	8	3	27
11	Italy	1½	½	1½	2	1½	2	2	2½	1	1	-	1½	1½	3	3	3	8	3	24½
12	Denmark	2	½	½	½	1½	½	1½	1½	1½	½	2½	-	3½	3	3	4	9	1	22½
13	Belgium	1	½	½	1½	1	1	0	1½	1½	2½	2½	½	-	1	2	2	11	1	17
14	Iceland	½	0	1½	0	1	1½	2	1½	1	2	1	1	3	-	1	1	11	2	17
15	Scotland	½	½	1	½	½	1	1½	½	½	½	1	1	2	3	-	1	12	1	14

=== Individual medals ===
Board 1		Board 2		Board 3		Board 4		Reserve	
(France) Alexander Alekhine	9½ / 12; 79.2	(United States) Frank Marshall	7 / 10; 70.0	(Sweden) Erik Lundin	10 / 14; 71.4	(Czechoslovakia) Karel Opočenský	11½ / 13; 88.5	(Hungary) Andor Lilienthal	10 / 13; 76.9
(United States) Isaac Kashdan	10 / 14; 71.4	(France) Louis Betbeder	8 / 18; 66.7	(United States) Reuben Fine	9 / 13; 69.2	(United States) Arthur Dake	10 / 13; 76.9	(Lithuania) Leonardas Abramavičius	6 / 9; 66.7
(Poland) Savielly Tartakower (Czechoslovakia) Salo Flohr	9 / 14; 64.3	(Poland) Paulino Frydman	7½ / 12; 62.5	(Latvia) Movsas Feigins	9 / 14; 64.3	(Austria) Hans Müller	9 / 13; 69.2	(United Kingdom) C. H. O'Donel Alexander	7 / 11; 63.6
