= Gerard Kroone =

Dutch chess player

Personal information
- Born: 1 February 1897 Amsterdam, Netherlands
- Died: 24 November 1979 (aged 82) Velsen, Netherlands

Chess career
- Country: Netherlands

Gerard Kroone (1 February 1897 – 24 November 1979) was a Dutch chess player.

== Biography ==
Gerard Kroone played for the Netherlands in the Chess Olympiads:

- In 1927, at third board in the 1st Chess Olympiad in London (+8, =2, -5),
- In 1928, at second board in the 2nd Chess Olympiad in The Hague (+7, =4, -5).

Kroone is also known for playing three matches in 1919 and 1923 with the future World Chess Champion Max Euwe, the first of which ended in a 5-5 tie.
