= Fritz Igel =

Austrian chess player

Personal information
- Born: 1898
- Died: unknown

Chess career
- Country: Austria; Brazil

Friedrich Karl Igel (also Frederico Carlos Igel; 1898 – unknown) was an Austrian chess player and writer.

== Biography ==
In 1914, Fritz Igel shared 1st — 2nd place in Chess Club Donaustadt tournament. He played in many important chess tournaments in the 1920s and 1930s, including Vienna's Leopold Trebitsch Memorial Tournaments.

Fritz Igel played for Austria in the Chess Olympiad:

- In 1933, at reserve board in the 5th Chess Olympiad in Folkestone (+1, =1, -2).

Presumably, in adulthood, he moved to Brazil. He is the author of two books about chess:

- Um die Weltmeisterschaft im Schachspiel Wien 1950. (in German).
- As Regras Enxadrísticas do Super Matador São Paulo 1972. (in Portuguese, author name is indicated as Frederico Carlos Igel).
