= José Vilardebó Picurena =

Spanish chess player (1902–1995

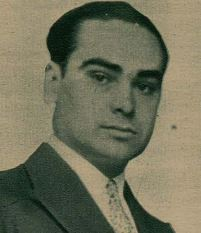
- A portrait of José Vilardebó Picurena

Personal information
- Born: 11 November 1902 Barcelona, Spain
- Died: 26 December 1995 (aged 93)

Chess career
- Country: Spain

José Vilardebó Picurena (Catalan: Josep Vilardebò i Picurena; 11 November 1902 – 26 December 1995) was a Spanish chess player, Spanish Chess Championship bronze medalist (1946), three-times Catalan Chess Championship winner (1926, 1928, 1935).

== Biography ==
José Vilardebó Picurena was one of the strongest chess players in Spain at the turn of the 1920s and 1930s. He won bronze medal in Spanish Chess Championship (1946) and three times won Catalan Chess Championship (1926, 1928, 1935). Also José Vilardebó Picurena won silver medal in Catalan Chess Championship (1923). He was participant of international chess tournaments in Barcelona (1929, 1946) and co-founder of the Barcelona Chess Club (1921).

José Vilardebó Picurena played for Spain in the Chess Olympiads:

- In 1927, at third board in the 1st Chess Olympiad in London (+0, =10, -5),
- In 1931, at second board in the 4th Chess Olympiad in Prague (+1, =12, -3).

José Vilardebó Picurena played for Spain in the chess radio match with the Argentine national team (1946).
