= Arthur Dake =

American chess player

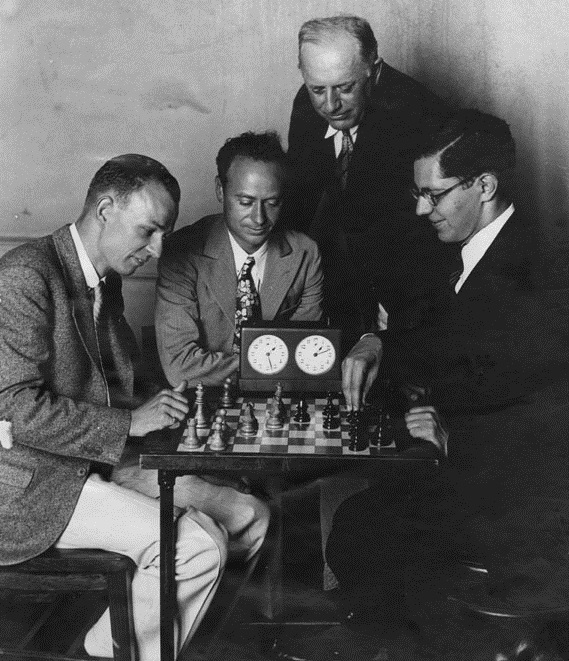
- Arthur Dake, Harry Borochow, tournament director Harry MacMahon and Isaac Kashdan at Pasadena

Personal information
- Full name: Arthur William Dake
- Born: April 8, 1910 Portland, Oregon, U.S.
- Died: April 28, 2000 (aged 90) Reno, Nevada, U.S.

Chess career
- Country: United States
- Title: Grandmaster (1986)
- Peak rating: 2365 (January 1977)

Arthur William Dake (April 8, 1910 – April 28, 2000) was an American chess player. He was born in Portland, Oregon and died in Reno, Nevada.

== Biography ==
Born Artur Darkowski, his father was of Polish and his mother of Norwegian ancestry (Edward Winter has quoted a mistaken statement with Dake's name on a list of chess players with Jewish roots), who immigrated to America before World War I. At age 16 he became a merchant seaman, traveling to Japan, China, and the Philippines. In 1927 he returned to high school in Oregon and learned chess from a Russian immigrant living in a local YMCA. He resumed work as a sailor and landed in New York City in 1929. New York was the center of chess in the U.S. at that time, and Dake teamed with leading checkers player Kenneth Grover in a Coney Island chess and checkers stand that accepted any challenger at 25 cents a game. The Wall Street Crash of 1929 made that business unviable.

Dake's first chess tournament was the 1930 New York State Championship, in which he finished third. In 1931 he won the championship of the Marshall Chess Club. The Great Depression years saw unparalleled U.S. dominance of world chess competition. When US teams won four consecutive Chess Olympiads in 1931, 1933, 1935, and 1937, Dake who played in 1931–1935 was one of their major members, along with Isaac Kashdan, Frank Marshall, Reuben Fine, Israel Horowitz, and Abraham Kupchik, winning two individual medals: silver (1933) and gold (1935).

- In 1931, on third board in 4th Chess Olympiad in Prague (+5 –2 =7).
- In 1933, on fourth board in 5th Chess Olympiad in Folkestone (+9 –2 =2).
- In 1935, on fourth board in 6th Chess Olympiad in Warsaw (+13 –0 =5).

In 1931, Dake tied for 1st-3rd with Akiba Rubinstein and Frederick Yates, in Antwerp. In 1932, he tied for 3rd-5th, after Alexander Alekhine and Kashdan, in Pasadena. He defeated World Champion Alekhine in their game at Pasadena, becoming the first American to do so. In 1934, he took 3rd in the U.S. Open Chess Championship. In 1934, he tied for 3rd-4th in Syracuse (Samuel Reshevsky won). In 1934, he tied for 2nd-3rd in the Manhattan Chess Club Championship. In 1934/35, he tied for 1st-3rd with Kashdan and Fine in Mexico City. In 1935, he took 2nd, behind Fine, in the U.S. Open. In 1936, he tied for 6-7th in the first U.S. Championship. In 1936, he tied for 2nd-3rd, behind Horowitz, in the U.S. Open. In 1938, he tied for 6-7th in the second U.S. Championship.

He had met his wife Helen on the return ocean liner trip from Warsaw in 1935. During the worldwide depression they moved back to Portland, where Dake had a career with the Oregon Department of Motor Vehicles for more than 30 years.

Dake was a member of a U. S. Team which went to Moscow in 1946. He drew his two games against Soviet grandmaster Andreas Lilienthal. In 1950, Dake played board 6 for the US in a radio match against Yugoslavia. He scored one draw and one loss against Stojan Puc. In 1952, he tied for 4th-5th in Hollywood (Svetozar Gligorić won). In 1954, Dake lost one game to David Bronstein in USA - USSR Match.

During the 1950s Dake played three times in the Oregon Open taking 1st place in 1953, 1958 and 1959 and participated twice in the US Open, Milwaukee 1953 and Long Beach 1955. During the 1960s he did not play any tournament chess.

After retiring from the DMV he returned to chess and participated five times in the international Louis D. Statham Tournaments at Lone Pine, California. There he defeated, among others, GM Levente Lengyel in 1974 and GM Kenneth Rogoff in 1976. Rogoff eventually tied for second place behind former world champion Tigran Petrosian. In 1975 Dake drew the eventual tournament winner GM Vladimir Liberzon.

In the 1987 US Open, held at Portland, Oregon, Dake's home town, he scored 8-4 (at the age of 77). He donated his personal chess library to the Portland Chess Club where he was an active member.

He was awarded the International Master title in 1954, and received the honorary Grandmaster title in 1986 in recognition of his results in the 1930s. In 1991 he was inducted into the US Chess Hall of Fame. He was the oldest competitive chess grandmaster in history, and died in 2000 at age 90. Dake spent his last night playing blackjack in the Sands Regency Casino in Reno Nevada. He died of natural causes.

Casey Bush wrote the book Grandmaster from Oregon on Dake's chess career and life.
