= Maurice Censer =

Belgian chess player

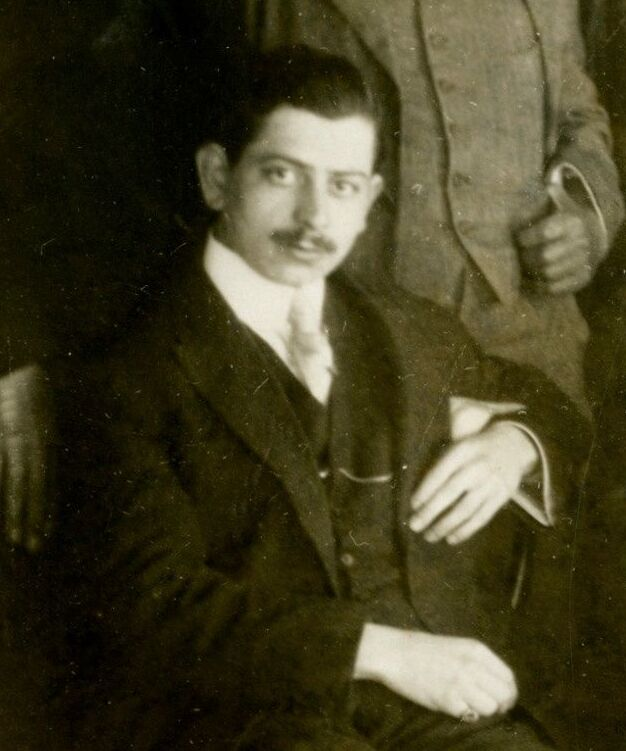
- Maurice Censer in 1915

Personal information
- Born: 20 September 1889
- Died: 10 December 1956 (aged 67)

Chess career
- Country: Belgium

Maurice Censer (also Marcel Censer; 20 September 1889 – 10 December 1956) was a Belgian chess player.

== Biography ==
Maurice Censer was one of Belgium's leading chess players from to the late 1910s to the late 1920s. In 1918, in Scheveningen he shared 3rd - 4th place in International Chess Tournament. In 1927, in Ghent Maurice Censer won 3rd place in Belgian Chess Championship.

Maurice Censer played for Belgium in the Chess Olympiad:

- In 1927, at fourth board in the 1st Chess Olympiad in London (+2, =4, -9).
