= Josep Tolosa =

Catalan physician, chess writer and player

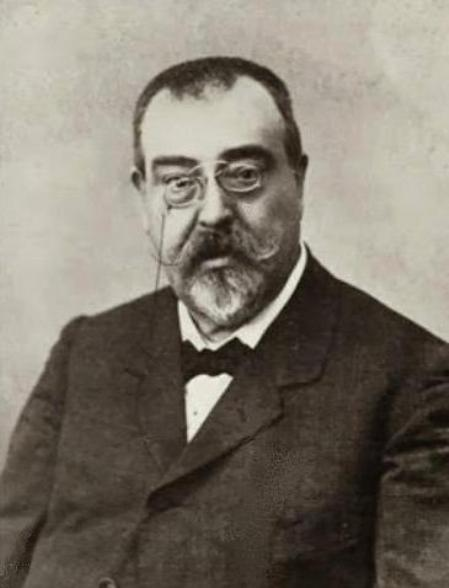
josep Tolosa

Josep Tolosa i Carreras, (Girona, November 20, 1846 – Barcelona, April 28, 1916) was a Catalan physician, chess writer and player.

He was a pupil of Joan Carbó i Batlle, and master of Josep Paluzie i Lucena and Valentí Marín i Llovet. He was a member in the chess clubs of Café del Recreo and Cafè Anglès.

== Works ==
- Articles in the publication Teoría y práctica del ajedrez, 1867
- Articles in the publication La Ilustración, 1883
- Articles in the publication Sportsmen's Club, 1904–1905
- Traité analytique du probleme d'échecs (Paris, 1892)
- Ruy López, (Barcelona, 1896–1899)
