= Alejandro Nogués Acuña =

Argentine chess player

Personal information
- Born: 1907
- Died: 1989 (aged 81–82)

Chess career
- Country: Argentina

Alejandro Nogués Acuña (Catamarca, 28 de marzo de 1907 – Buenos Aires, 6 de octubre de 1989) was an Argentine chess player.

== Biography ==
Alejandro Nogués Acuña was an international chess master and one of the strongest chess players of Argentina in the 1920s–1930s. He was repeated participant in Argentine Chess Championship in which he ranked 2nd in 1926, 4th in 1931, and 3rd in 1938. His main achievement in international chess tournaments was shared 3rd-4th places in Buenos Aires in 1931.

Alejandro Nogués Acuña played for Argentina in the Chess Olympiad:

- In 1927, at third board in the 1st Chess Olympiad in London (+5, =5, -5).

Also he played for Argentina in the radio match with the Uruguay national chess team (1946).
