= Luis G. Cortes =

Spanish chess player

Personal information
- Born: unknown
- Died: unknown

Chess career
- Country: Spain

Luis G. Cortes (Catalan: Lluís G. Cortes; unknown – unknown) was a Spanish chess player, Catalan Chess Championship winner (1923).

== Biography ==
In the 1920s, Luis G. Cortes was one of the leading Spanish chess players. In 1923, he won the Catalan Chess Championship.

Luis G. Cortes played for Spain in the Chess Olympiad:

- In 1928, at second board in the 2nd Chess Olympiad in The Hague (+1, =5, -10).
