= Erling Tholfsen =

American chess player

Personal information
- Born: January 12, 1904 New York City, United States
- Died: December 6, 1996 (aged 92) New York City, United States

Chess career
- Country: United States

Erling Tholfsen (12 January 1904 – 6 December 1996) was an American chess player, Chess Olympiad team silver medal winner (1928).

== Biography ==
In the 1920s Erling Tholfsen was one of the leading American chess players. He three times won New York City Marshall Chess Club Championships (1923, 1924, 1931).

Erling Tholfsen played for United States in the Chess Olympiad:

- In 1928, as team captain in the 2nd Chess Olympiad in The Hague (+4, =5, -4) and won team silver medal.

Erling Tholfsen retired from chess tournaments after the Great Depression. He worked as a Spanish teacher in the New York City public school system and was very active in the labor movement for many years.

Erling Tholfsen was exempt from the WW2 draft due to his age and having two small children. He was placed in charge of the US War Bond drive for James Madison High School. The drive was the most successful school drive in the United States. The school sold enough bonds to purchase a B-24 Liberator bomber. Tholfsen and his team received a presidential award, which was sent to NYC Mayor LaGuardia's office for presentation to the team.
