= Fernando Canon =

Filipino revolutionary general, inventor

Fernando Canon Faustino
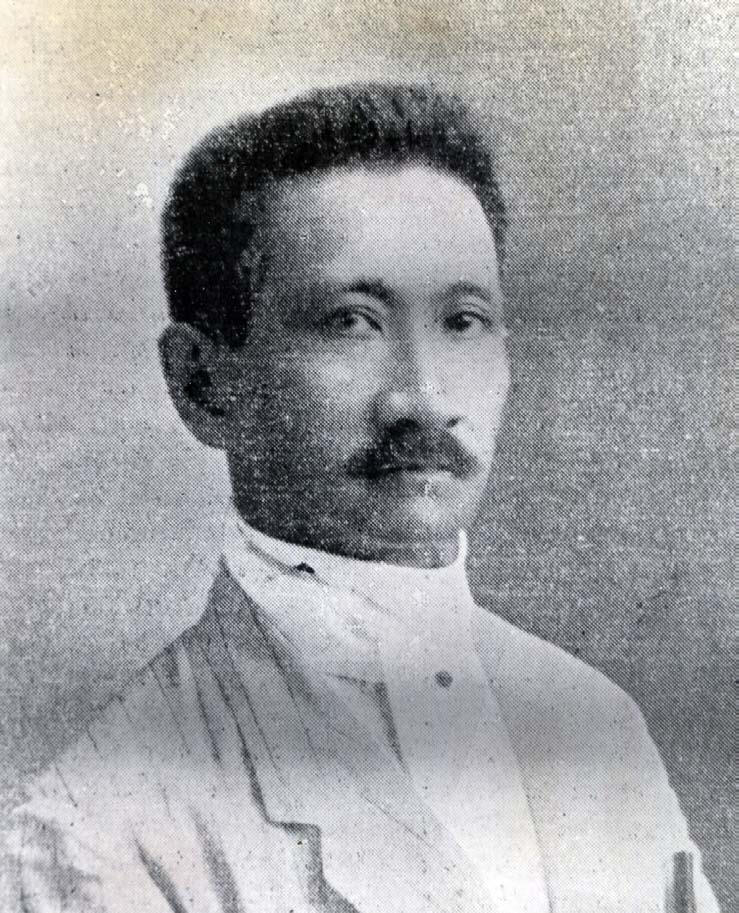
- Born: August 6, 1860; Biñan, Laguna, Captaincy General of the Philippines, Spanish Empire
- Died: July 18, 1938 (aged 77); Manila, Commonwealth of the Philippines
- Resting place: Mausoleo de los Veteranos de la Revolución, Manila North Cemetery
- Other name: Kuitib (La Solidaridad pen name)
- Education: Ateneo Municipal De Manila; Universidad Central de Madrid
- Known for: Revolutionary general
- Children: 10, including: Guillermo Canon Batlle, Teresita Canon Batlle de Buenviaje, Carmen Canon de Castueras, Rosario Canon Venta de Jardín
- Relatives: Dr. Corazon Buenviaje y Canon (granddaughter), Dr. Fernando Canon y Basco (grandson), Maria Teresa Canon de García (granddaughter), Rosabella Jardin de Publico (granddaughter), Anna Clarissa Publico de Ong (great granddaughter), Herminia Jardin y Canon (granddaughter), Rolando Almazan y Buenviaje (great grandson), Renato Almazan y Buenviaje (great grandson), Fernando Canon y Relova (great grandson)

Fernando Canon-Faustino y Alumno (August 6, 1860 – July 18, 1938) was a Filipino revolutionary general, poet, inventor, engineer, musician, and the Philippines' first National Chess Champion in 1908.

== Life and career ==
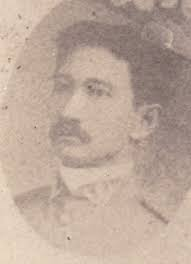

Fernando was born to Fernando Canon-Faustino y Guevara, a watchmaker, and Blasa Alumno y Salvador, a wealthy landowner in Biñan, Laguna. When he was young, his family moved from Biñan to Calle Cabildo in Intramuros. He studied at the Ateneo Municipal de Manila and subsequently pursued his medical studies at the Universidad Central de Madrid (now the Universidad Complutense de Madrid). While in Spain, Canon-Faustino met María Teresa Batllé Casas, a Barcelona native who would become his wife.

A childhood friend of Jose Rizal, the two maintained an extensive correspondence; their letters are in possession of his granddaughter Maria Teresa García-Canon. Like Rizal, Canon-Faustino was a polyglot, speaking six languages: French, Spanish, Tagalog, German, English, and Italian. Canon and his wife smuggled copies of La Solidaridad and Noli Me Tángere in the Philippines, disguising them as bank ledgers.

Canon-Faustino served as a cabinet member of the Revolutionary Government of the Philippines as Secretary of Welfare and Director-General of Public Works. During the Philippine–American War, Canon served as a General in Nueva Vizcaya. He was exiled to Spain, where he taught electrical and mechanical engineering and ran a clinic. He refused to swear allegiance to the United States and rejected his pension as a veteran of the Philippine-American War. Upon returning to the Philippines in late 1907, he taught at the Liceo de Manila.

Fernando Canon-Faustino died on the July 18, 1938.

== Literary works ==
His first published poem, under the pseudonym kuitib, was the sonnet A las dalagas malolenses, which appeared in the newspaper La Solidaridad in 1889. It was an ode dedicated to the young women of Malolos, who petitioned for Spanish classes in the evening, celebrating hidden progress and changes: Gold, though covered by slag, emerges much brighter through fire.

His poem Flor ideal (“Ideal Flower”) was published in the second issue of Cultura Filipina in May 1910. It later also appeared in a book along with another poem, A la Laguna de Bay.

In the anthology Parnaso Filipino, published around 1923, Eduardo Martín de la Cámara included two of his poems: Flor Ideal and Rizal Artista. Two of Canon's poems dedicated to Rizal appeared in Poesías dedicadas a José Rizal, published by the Philippine National Centennial Commission in 1961.

Several of his essays, including "Cundiman," "Kuriapi," "Kawit," "Fire-resistant roofs for light materials," "Ohm's Law," and "Practical Memories," appeared in Cultura Filipina, a monthly arts and science magazine in the Philippines, between 1910 and 1914.

A passage from Practical Memories describes a vegetable garden Canon discovered on his daily trips from Sarriá (Spain) to Barcelona:

The windmills quivered soundlessly at the slightest blow of breeze and drops or trickles of water gathered at the pond to be distributed, as dew, as cleaning or underground water with temperature and fertilizers that allow the early exuberant growth of small red radishes, artistically clustered here, and there minute cucumbers, now compact ivory lettuce, and in its season, the coveted succulent asparagus and even the ridged watercress...

Canon used the memory of this orchard to discuss the situation of cultivation and land use in the Philippines.

In 1921, he published his narrative poem A la Laguna de Bay, which represents the integration of Philippine esoteric knowledge and spirituality with technology, philosophical thinking, and modernity.

== Other achievements ==
Canon's inventions included improvements to electrotherapeutic devices, a soap for lepers, and a cane that doubled as a stun gun.

Canon studied classical guitar with Francisco Tárrega in Spain. He became the first secretary of the Conservatory of Music of the University of the Philippines when it was founded in 1916. He sought to document and preserve traditional Philippine instruments such as kumintang, kudyapi, kundiman, and balitaw, recognizing their importance to Filipino cultural heritage.

Canon was also a chess player. In 1905, he won the first Catalan Chess Championship held at the Sportmen's Club of Barcelona, and upon his return to the Philippines, he won the first national chess championship in 1908. After winning the championship, there is no further record of Canon ever competing in another chess tournament.
