= Isidore Censer =

Belgian chess player

Personal information
- Born: 14 February 1898 Antwerp, Belgium
- Died: 23 March 1973 (aged 75) Saint-Gilles, Belgium

Chess career
- Country: Belgium

Isidore Censer (14 February 1898 – 23 March 1973) was a Belgian chess player.

== Biography ==
Isidore Censer was one of Belgium's leading chess players in the late 1920s and early 1930s. In 1923, in Brussels he won minor tournament in 1st La Nation Belge chess cup. In 1930, Isidore Censer participated in International Chess Tournament in Brussels. In 1931, he won 3rd place in Belgian Chess Championship.

Isidore Censer played for Belgium in the Chess Olympiads:

- In 1927, at second board in the 1st Chess Olympiad in London (+3, =3, -9),
- In 1928, at third board in the 2nd Chess Olympiad in The Hague (+4, =7, -5).

Isidore Censer was diamond merchant by profession.
