= Remo Calapso =

Italian chess player

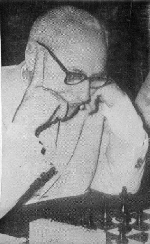

Personal information
- Born: 11 October 1905 Palermo, Italy
- Died: 21 May 1975 (aged 69) Rome, Italy

Chess career
- Country: Italy

Remo Calapso (11 October 1905 – 21 May 1975) was an Italian chess player.

== Biography ==
Remo Calapso was Italian national chess master (1924), Italian national correspondence chess master (1925–26; 1929–30), problematic and solver of chess problems. He collaborated with chess magazine L'Italia Scacchistica (1926).

Remo Calapso took part in numerous chess tournaments: Palermo (26 May-3 June 1924), Foligno (14-25 September 1924), Bologna (13-27 September 1925), Livorno (1-15 August 1926), Florence (4-17 October 1936; 1948), Chioggia-Sottomarina Lido (May 24-June 2, 1970), Imperia (September 19–27, 1970), Rovigo (October 3–11, 1970), Catanzaro (April 17–25, 1971).

Remo Calapso played for Italy in the Chess Olympiad:

- In 1928, at fourth board in the 2nd Chess Olympiad in The Hague (+0, =0, -5).

Remo Calapso was in Messina for a good part of his life, not by chance he is often considered a native of Messina. He came from a family of mathematicians and chess players, and he excelled in both disciplines. His grandfather, Catello Calapso, had also been a good player and a problem player. Remo Calapso faced top level players, achieving commendable results. Among these he should mention a draw with the world champion Tigran Petrosian, obtained in the 6th round of the 1967 Venice chess tournament.

Petrosian himself recalled - in the Russian chess magazine Shachmatnaja Moskva - a curious event that took place in the tournament, following that draw, when Grandmaster (GM) Dragoljub Janošević approached him with a vengeance. He thus turned to the world champion: "How did you manage to come with him?" - said Janosević. - "I will show you how to play!" Two days later, in the 9th round, Calapso led the white pieces against Janosević, playing in a very precise manner, so much so that already at the twentieth move the great Yugoslav master found himself with Queen's side completely devoid of pieces, only to be forced to leave after a few moves.

Vincenzo Nestler, the strongest Sicilian player of the modern era, learned to play in Messina, right at the home of his friend Calapso. Calapso used to get shaved by a barber at his home, and during the beard he didn't disdain to play various games blindly against some opponents. On one of those occasions, when Calapso was playing four games blindly, Nestler was also present who was impressed and fascinated by this ability, and after that event he devoted himself to chess, becoming the strong chess player.
