= Carl Oscar Hovind =

Norwegian chess player (1901–1982)

Personal information
- Born: 13 February 1901
- Died: 5 February 1982 (aged 80)

Chess career
- Country: Norway

Carl Oscar Hovind (13 February 1901 – 5 February 1982) was a Norwegian chess player and writer, Norwegian Chess Federation president (1946–1949).

== Biography ==
In the 1930s Carl Oscar Hovind was one of the leading Norwegian chess players. He was a member of the chess club Schakklubben av 1911. Hovind was the author of the book Sjakk for Alle (Chess for All) (Cappelen, Oslo, 1943). From 1946 to 1949 he was President of the Norwegian Chess Federation. He also played correspondence chess on a national level.

Carl Oscar Hovind played for Norway in the Chess Olympiads:

- In 1930, at second board in the 3rd Chess Olympiad in Hamburg (+0, =3, -11),
- In 1931, at fourth board in the 4th Chess Olympiad in Prague (+1, =2, -9).

Hovind worked as Administrative Director of both the Norwegian insurance companies Nye Norske (1949–1966) and Samvirke (1949–1966).
