= Alberto Campolongo =

Italian chess player

Personal information
- Born: 16 March 1912 Bari, Italy
- Died: 5 March 1991 Milan, Italy

Chess career
- Country: Italy

Alberto Campolongo (16 March 1912 – 5 Marzo 1991) was an Italian chess player.

== Biography ==
In 1931, in Milan Alberto Campolongo won the National Chess Tournament. In 1933, he won the National Chess Master's degree, shared 4th-5th place with Antonio Sacconi in the Padulli Memorial Chess Tournament. In 1937, he ranked 4th in Milan behind Stefano Rosselli del Turco, Antonio Sacconi and Esteban Canal.

He has regularly participated in the Italian Chess Championships in which he was shared 7th-8th in 1939 (tournament won Mario Monticelli) and ranked 9th in 1943 (tournament won Vincenzo Nestler).

Alberto Campolongo played for Italy in the Chess Olympiad:

- In 1933, at reserve board in the 5th Chess Olympiad in Folkestone (+2, =4, -5).

Alberto Campolongo played for Italy in the unofficial Chess Olympiad:

- In 1936, at sixth board in the 3rd unofficial Chess Olympiad in Munich (+4, =1, -10).
