= André Voisin (chess player) =

French chess player (fl.1928)

Personal information
- Born: unknown
- Died: unknown

Chess career
- Country: France

André Voisin (unknown — unknown) was a French chess player, French Chess Championship medalist (1928).

== Biography ==
In the late 1920s - early 1930s André Voisin was one of the leading chess players in France. He was multiple participant of the French Chess Championships, where reached the best results in 1928 (3rd place) and 1931 (4th place).

André Voisin played for France in the Chess Olympiads:

- In 1930, at reserve board in the 3rd Chess Olympiad in Hamburg (+1, =3, -9),
- In 1933, at reserve board in the 5th Chess Olympiad in Folkestone (+1, =3, -4).
