= Placido Soler Bordas =

Spanish chess player

Personal information
- Born: 22 November 1903 Barcelona, Spain
- Died: 14 July 1964 (aged 60) Barcelona, Spain

Chess career
- Country: Spain

Placido Soler Bordas (Catalan: Plàcid Soler i Bordas; 22 November 1903 – 14 July 1964) was a Spanish chess player, two-times Catalan Chess Championship winner (1924, 1931).

== Biography ==
Placido Soler Bordas was one of the strongest chess players in Spain at the turn of the 1920s and 1930s. He two times won Catalan Chess Championship (1924, 1931). Also Placido Soler Bordas won silver medal in Catalan Chess Championship (1926). He was eleven-time winner of the Catalan Chess Team Championships. Placido Soler Bordas was participant of international chess tournament in Barcelona (1929). He was co-founder and first chairman of the Barcelona Chess Club (1921) and Chess Club Comtal (1923). Also Placido Soler Bordas known as a chess journalist, he was founder of chess journal Els Escacs a Catalunya.

Placido Soler Bordas played for Spain in the Chess Olympiads:

- In 1927, at fourth board in the 1st Chess Olympiad in London (+1, =4, -10),
- In 1930, at reserve board in the 3rd Chess Olympiad in Hamburg (+5, =6, -5),
- In 1931, at third board in the 4th Chess Olympiad in Prague (+1, =4, -11).
