= Ored Karlin =

Swedish chess player

Personal information
- Born: 1905
- Died: 28 October 1969 (aged 63–64)

Chess career
- Country: Sweden

Ored Karlin (1905 – 28 October 1969) was a chess player from Sweden.

== Biography ==
Ored Karlin was one of Sweden’s strongest chess players in the 1920s and 1930s. He participated in the Swedish Chess Championships. In 1933, Ored Karlin shared 1st place in Alcoy and ranked 2nd in an international chess tournament held in Madrid. In 1935 he participated in an international chess tournament in Helsinki.

Ored Karlin played for Sweden in the Chess Olympiad:

- In 1928, at fourth board in the 2nd Chess Olympiad in The Hague (+2, =6, -3).
