= Julius Nielsen =

Danish chess player

- Country: Denmark
- Born: 27 December 1901
- Died: 1981 (aged 79–80)
- Title: Correspondence Chess International Master (1967)

Julius Nielsen (27 December 1901 – 1981) was a Danish chess player, a two-time Danish Chess Championship medalist (1934, 1943) and a Correspondence Chess International Master (IM, 1967).

From the 1930s to the 1940s, Nielsen was one of Danish leading chess players, participated many times in the finals of Danish Chess Championships and two times won a medal: bronze in 1934 in Vejle and silver in 1943 in Helsingør. He played for Denmark in two Chess Olympiads: in 1933, at reserve board in the 5th Chess Olympiad in Folkestone (+1, =6, -5) and in 1935, at fourth board in the 6th Chess Olympiad in Warsaw (+2, =1, -5). In 1936, he played at fifth board in the 3rd unofficial Chess Olympiad in Munich (+7, =7, -5).

In his youth, Nielsen played correspondence chess and won a tournament over a future grandmaster, Paul Keres. He returned to the correspondence game in the postwar years and found success in the 1960s and '70s. He participated in two World Correspondence Chess Championship finals. In 1965—1968 he shared 8th — 9th place in the 5th championship and in 1972—1975 was ranked 16th in the 7th. In 1967, he was titled a Correspondence Chess International Master.
