= Ernesto Hellmann =

Italian chess player

Personal information
- Born: 9 November 1898
- Died: 9 September 1952 (aged 53)

Chess career
- Country: Italy

Ernesto Hellmann (9 November 1898 – 9 September 1952) was an Italian chess player.

== Biography ==
In the 1920s and 1930s Ernesto Hellmann was one of Italy's leading chess players. He was Italian national chess master.

Ernesto Hellmann played for Italy in the Chess Olympiads:

- In 1928, at third board in the 2nd Chess Olympiad in The Hague (+3, =2, -3).
- In 1931, at fourth board in the 4th Chess Olympiad in Prague (+2, =3, -13).

Ernesto Hellmann played for Italy in the unofficial Chess Olympiad:

- In 1936, at second reserve board in the 3rd unofficial Chess Olympiad in Munich (+3, =2, -3).
