= Unto Venäläinen =

Finnish chess player (born 1944)

Personal information
- Born: 29 February 1944 (age 82) Lahti, Finland

Chess career
- Country: Finland
- Title: FIDE Master (1990); International Correspondence Chess Master (1973)
- Peak rating: 2360 (January 1975)

Unto Eevert Venäläinen (born 29 February 1944) is a Finnish chess FIDE Master (FM), International Correspondence Chess Master (IMC) (1973) and Finnish Chess Championship silver medalist (1974).

== Biography ==
From the late 1960s to the early 1980s, Unto Venäläinen was one of the leading Finnish chess players. He won a silver medal at the Finnish Chess Championship in 1974.

Unto Venäläinen played for Finland in the Chess Olympiads:

- In 1968, at the second reserve board in the 18th Chess Olympiad in Lugano (+1, =3, -6),
- In 1974, at the first reserve board in the 21st Chess Olympiad in Nice (+5, =4, -6).

Unto Venäläinen also played for Finland in the Telechess Olympiads twice (1978, 1982).

Unto Venäläinen actively participated in correspondence chess tournaments. In 1970 and 1972, he twice won the Finnish Correspondence Chess Championship. In 1973, Unto Venäläinen was awarded the title of International Correspondence Chess Master (IMC).
