= Pedro Puig Pulido =

Spanish chess player (1932–2019)

Personal information
- Born: 20 December 1932
- Died: 13 July 2019 (aged 86)

Chess career
- Country: Spain

Pedro Puig Pulido (Catalan: Pere Puig i Pulido; 20 December 1932 – 13 July 2019) was a Spanish chess player, Spanish Chess Championship silver medalist (1961), two-times Catalan Chess Championship winner (1961, 1968).

== Biography ==
Pulido was one of the strongest chess players in Spain in the 1960s. He won silver medal in Spanish Chess Championship (1961) and two times won Catalan Chess Championship (1961, 1968). Also Pedro Puig Pulido won two silver medals in Catalan Chess Championship (1964, 1972). With chess club CE Espanyol Barcelona he won silver (1968) and three bronze (1964, 1973, 1974) medals in Spanish Team Chess Championships. Pedro Puig Pulido was participant of many international chess tournaments in Spain.

He played for Spain in the Chess Olympiads:

- In 1960, at second reserve board in the 14th Chess Olympiad in Leipzig (+4, =5, -2),
- In 1962, at third board in the 15th Chess Olympiad in Varna (+3, =3, -5).

Pulido played for Spain in the European Team Chess Championship:

- In 1961, at fifth board in the 2nd European Team Chess Championship in Oberhausen (+2, =4, -4).

He played for Spain in the European Team Chess Championship preliminaries:

- In 1957, at eighth board in the 1st European Team Chess Championship preliminaries (+2, =1, -1),
- In 1961, at reserve board in the 2nd European Team Chess Championship preliminaries (+2, =0, -0),
- In 1965, at eighth board in the 3rd European Team Chess Championship preliminaries (+1, =1, -0).

Pulido played for Spain in the World Student Team Chess Championships:

- In 1955, at third board in the 2nd World Student Team Chess Championship in Lyon (+6, =2, -3),
- In 1956, at third board in the 3rd World Student Team Chess Championship in Uppsala (+3, =0, -4).

He played for Spain in the Clare Benedict Chess Cups:

- In 1962, at fourth board in the 9th Clare Benedict Chess Cup in Bern (+1, =3, -0) and won individual gold medal,
- In 1963, at reserve board in the 10th Clare Benedict Chess Cup in Lucerne (+0, =0, -2).

Pulido died on 13 July 2019, at the age of 86.
