= Harold Meyer Phillips =

American chess player

Personal information
- Born: 15 December 1874
- Died: 7 January 1967 (aged 92)

Chess career
- Country: United States

Harold Meyer Phillips (15 December 1874 – 7 January 1967) was an American chess player and chess life organizer.

== Biography ==
Phillips was a lawyer by profession. In 1903, he won Manhattan Chess Club Championship. He was one of the leading organizers of American chess life in the first half of the 20th century. Phillips was the organizer and director of the great New York Tournament (1924), President of the Manhattan Chess Club in the 1930s, President of the Marshall Chess Club, and President of the Intercollegiate Chess League.

Phillips played for United States in the Chess Olympiad: in 1930, at third board in the 3rd Chess Olympiad in Hamburg (+0−1=1).

He played in chess tournaments for over 70 years.
