= Eino Heilimo =

Finnish chess player

- Country: Finland
- Born: 21 March 1887; Turku, Finland
- Died: 30 August 1974 (aged 87); Iisalmi, Finland

Eino Heilimo (21 March 1887 – 30 August 1974) was a Finnish chess player.

== Biography ==
Eino Heilimo graduated from Faculty of Law in University of Helsinki. After graduation, he worked as a judge in various cities, in particular in Vyborg. In 1942 he retired and settled in Iisalmi.

Eino Heilimo played for Finland in the Chess Olympiad:

- In 1927, at third board in the 1st Chess Olympiad in London (+1, =5, -9).

Eino Heilimo played for Finland in the unofficial Chess Olympiad:

- In 1936, at fifth board in the 3rd unofficial Chess Olympiad in Munich (+0, =3, -10).

Due to busy occupation in the main work, he active participated in correspondence chess tournaments. In 1947, Eino Heilimo was the first in Finland who receive the title of master in correspondence chess. In 1952, he was arbiter of the Chess Olympiad in Helsinki. After the founding of the Finnish Correspondence Chess Federation (FCCF), Eino Heilimo was its first chairman (1961 - 1968). In 1967 he became an honorary member of the International Correspondence Chess Federation. In 1947, Eino Heilimo was awarded the silver medal of the Finnish Chess Federation, and in 1967 received the gold medal of the same organization.
