= Holger Norman-Hansen =

Danish chess player (1899–1984)

Holger Norman-Hansen (2 January 1899 – 26 March 1984) was a Danish chess master.

Norman-Hansen played for Denmark in Chess Olympiads:

- In the 1st Chess Olympiad at London 1927 (+11 -2 =2);
- In the 2nd Chess Olympiad at The Hague 1928 (+4 -7 =5);
- In the 3rd unofficial Chess Olympiad at Munich 1936 (+8 -6 =5).

He won individual gold medal and team silver medal in 1927.

He was Danish Champion in 1939 after a play-off. He also finished 1st= in 1936 but lost the play-off.
