= Arne Desler =

Danish chess player

Personal information
- Born: 1894
- Died: 1979 (aged 84–85)

Chess career
- Country: Denmark

Arne Desler (1894 — 1979), was a Danish chess player.

== Biography ==
From the 1920s to the 1940s, Arne Desler was one of Danish leading chess players. From 1925 to 1943 he participated many times in the finals of Danish Chess Championships. In 1928, in simultaneous exhibition he defeated the ex-world Chess Champion José Raúl Capablanca.

Arne Desler played for Denmark in the Chess Olympiad:

- In 1930, at third board in the 3rd Chess Olympiad in Hamburg (+2, =8, -6).
