= Alvar Alonso Rosell =

Spanish chess grandmaster (born 1992)

Alvar Alonso
- Alonso in 2026

Personal information
- Born: 13 September 1992 (age 34) Figueres, Spain

Chess career
- Country: Spain
- Title: Grandmaster (2013)
- FIDE rating: 2560 (September 2026)
- Peak rating: 2572 (March 2021)

Àlvar Alonso Rosell (born 13 September 1992 in Figueres, Girona) is a Spanish chess Grandmaster. He is ranked 10th best chess player in Spain.

He was champion of Spain in 2011, surpassing the player Miguel Illescas. Alonso Rosell also won other national championships; he was the 2004 champion of Spain in the U-12, the 2006 champion in U-14, the 2008 and 2009 youth champion of Catalonia, in 2009 champion of Spain in the U-18, and the 2011 runner up in Catalonia behind Marc Narciso. In 2014 he defeated Narciso to become the 2014 Catalonia chess champion.

On 23 December 2018 he won the 5th Sunway Sitges Chess Festival by scoring 8/10, half a point more than strong grandmasters such as Vassily Ivanchuk and Dmitry Andreikin.
