= Dugald MacIsaac =

Scottish chess player

Personal information
- Born: 25 July 1901 Ardrishaig, Scotland
- Died: 20 February 1961 (aged 59) Glasgow, Scotland

Chess career
- Country: United Kingdom

Dugald McBrayne MacIsaac (25 Jule 1901 – 20 February 1961) was a Scottish chess player.

== Biography ==
MacIsaac moved to Glasgow from his native Ardrishaig before World War I. He was active in correspondence chess circles in the 1920s. Dugald MacIsaac joined Glasgow's Central Chess Club and won the club championship on a number of occasions. In 1938, he won his tenth championship of the club. MacIsaac was a leading member of the club's Richardson Cup team, winning the trophy in 1925 and 1929. He was also a member of Glasgow Chess Club and won the club championship in 1924. Dugald MacIsaac also won the West of Scotland Championship in 1927, 1928 and 1938. He was chess correspondent for The Herald from 1930 to 1959.

MacIsaac played for Scotland in the Chess Olympiad:

- In 1933, at third board in the 5th Chess Olympiad in Folkestone (+0, =2, -9).
