= Juan Manuel Rivarola =

Argentine chess player

Personal information
- Born: 8 August 1899 Rosario, Argentina
- Died: 1985 (aged 85–86)

Chess career
- Country: Argentina

Juan Manuel Rivarola (8 August 1899 – 1985) was an Argentine chess player, and organizer who contributed to the development of chess in Argentina in the early and mid-20th century.

== Biography ==
Juan Manuel Rivarola was one of the strongest chess players of Argentina in the 1920s–1930s. In 1926, he ranked 5th in Argentine Chess Championship. He was participant of several chess tournaments held in Argentina.

Juan Manuel Rivarola played for Argentina in the Chess Olympiad:

- In 1927, at second board in the 1st Chess Olympiad in London (+0, =7, -8).

His book Autobiografía ajedrecística (transl. Chess autobiography) retold of memories of notable chess players- Emanuel Lasker, Alexander Alekhine, Richard Réti, Siegbert Tarrasch, as well as about the chess life in Argentina before and after the Second World War.
