= José Aguilera Bernabé =

Spanish chess player

Chess career
- Country: Spain

José Aguilera Bernabé was a Spanish chess player.

== Biography ==
José Aguilera Bernabé was one of the strongest chess players in Spain at the turn of the 1920s and 1930s. In 1929, he participated in International Chess Tournament in Barcelona (tournament won José Raúl Capablanca).

José Aguilera Bernabé played for Spain in the Chess Olympiad:

- In 1928, at third board in the 2nd Chess Olympiad in The Hague (+2, =3, -11).
