= Egyházaskesző =

- Location of Veszprém county in Hungary

- Location of Egyházaskesző
- Coordinates: 47.41838°N 17.32407°E
- Country: Hungary
- County: Veszprém

Area
  - Total: 20.12 km^{2} (7.77 sq mi)

Population (2004)
  - Total: 582
  - Density: 28.92/km^{2} (74.9/sq mi)
- Time zone: UTC+1 (CET)
  - Summer (DST): UTC+2 (CEST)
- Postal code: 8523
- Area code: 89

Egyházaskesző (pronounced [ˈɛɟhaːzɒʃkɛsøː]) is a village in Veszprém county, Hungary.

== Notable people ==
- Arpad Elo, mathematician
