= Finnish Correspondence Chess Federation =

The Finnish Correspondence Chess Federation (FCCF; Finnish: Suomen Kirjeshakkiliitto) is a member of the International Correspondence Chess Federation (ICCF) in Europe.

== History ==
=== Overview ===
The first known correspondence chess game in Finland started on 1 March 1889. Helsinki Chess Club organised a match between Messers Backmansson and Öhquist. The opening was English opening and it ended already in 11 moves into a win of Öhquist.

The first team-game played by cards started on 16 October 1890 between Helsinki Chess-Club and Tarto in Estonia.

Correspondence chess, as it is known today, started on 2 December 1928 when Der Internationaler Fernschachbund (IFSB), the predecessor of ICCF, was founded in Berlin. The first Finnish person in the organization of IFSB's was A. Hinds, who was elected as an adjudicator in 1935.

The first Finnish participant in the championship tournaments of IFSB was Fritz R. Soininen in 1937. The story of IFSB's organization as a representative of all correspondence chess players was ended by the Second World War in 1939. After the war the International Correspondence Chess Association (ICCA) was founded and B. H. Wood from Britain was chosen as the president. The years after the war were chaotic including mail deliveries and after some years a new organization called the International Correspondence Chess Federation (ICCF) was founded. The first president of ICCF was J. L. Ormond from Switzerland. The first Finnish person in the administration of ICCF was Per-Erik Ekblom. He was elected as an auditor at the Krems Congress in 1967. Since then the longest Finnish career in the ICCF executive board was made by Ragnar Wikman.

The Finnish Central Chess Federation was a member of the International Correspondence Chess Federation. Authorized by it the leader of the correspondence chess section acted as the representative of ICCF in Finland. The first unofficial correspondence championship tournament in Finland was played during the war 1944–1946. The winner of the championship was Eino Heilimo.

In the 1950s it was decided to found a federation that specialized in correspondence chess in Finland. The first organization was founded on 6 January 1955 based on the ideas of government counselor Paavo Lihtonen. Eino Heilimo from Iisalmi was elected as the first chairman. However, the foundation fell through internal disagreements.

The present Finnish Correspondence Chess Federation (FCCF) was founded in 1961. Eino Heilimo was also the first chairman of the new federation. The chairmen of the Federation on following:

- 1) Eino Heilimo 1961–1968
- 2) Matti Uitto 1969–1973
- 3) Raimo Lindroos 1974–1979 and 1984–6.5.1990
- 4) Leo Lahdenmäki 1980–1983
- 5) Esko Nuutilainen 6.5.1990–7.10.1990 (as vice chairman)
- 6) Heikki Brusila 7.10.1990–31.12.1991 and 1.1.1994– 2009
- 7) Erik Wahlberg 1992–1993
- 8) Heikki Arppi 2010–present

The Finnish championship tournament has officially been run 61 times and unofficially, before the current organization, six times. The most successful player has been Bo Jäderholm from Turku. He has won five gold, two silver and one bronze medal.

=== World Championship Gold and Bronze ===
Pertti Lehikoinen was the first Finn to win the Correspondence Chess World Championship. His moment of glory came in the XX World Championship Final, which took from 25.10.2004 to 20.2.2011. Incidentally, this was the longest Final and his successors from the 21st, 22nd and 23rd Finals are already known.

The first Finn to gain access to the World Championship Final was Risto Kauranen from Jyväskylä. He was fifth in the X tournament 1978–1984 and got the bronze medal in the XII tournament 1984–1991.

Asko Linna from Kokkola has also been successful in the World Championship Final. He was fourth in the XVII tournament 2002–2007, only half a point from the winner.

=== The Golden 1980s ===
The Finnish correspondence chess had its golden era in the 1980s. In the biggest national tournament, in memoriam Usko Koskinen, as many as 264 players participated. The year was 1984. In 1980 the Finnish Correspondence Chess Federation had 1200 members. In 1974 altogether 1001 players participated in different tournaments and the total number of games played was 3397. Even in the 1990s there was a big tournament, when in the friendly match between Sweden and Finland there were 579 tables. That number is the world record.

=== Twice in the Olympic Final ===
The Finnish national team has reached the Olympic Final twice. In the X Olympic Final (1987–95) Finland was 9th. In the Finnish team there played Juhani Sorri, Pentti Palmo, Olli Koskinen, Timothy Binham, Ilkka Kanko and Torvald Perman.

The second time, when Finland is in the Olympic Final, is year 2010. This is one of the last postal Olympic Finals. The Finnish team is composed of Tero Kokkila, Ilkka Salmi, Pertti Raivio and again Pentti Palmo.

=== Ladies World Championship Final ===
A Finn has participated in the Ladies World Championship once, when Aulikki Ristoja-Lehtimäki placed 11th in the VI final tournament in the 1990s.

=== European Championship Finals ===
In the personal European Championship finals Finland has achieved one silver (Risto Kauranen) and four bronze medals (Risto Kauranen, Pentti Palmo, Lauri Lempiäinen and Toivo Saarenpää).

== World Champion ==
- Lehikoinen, Pertti FIN GM 2011

== Grandmasters ==
- Siikaluoma, Auno FIN GM 2012
- Pigg, Heikki FIN GM 2007
- Linna, Asko FIN GM 2006
- Hiltunen, Reijo FIN GM 1999
- Tikkanen, Kari FIN GM 1999
- Kivimäki, Jaakko FIN GM 1998
- Kokkila, Tero FIN GM 1996
- Österman, Georg FIN GM 1994
- Kujala, Auvo FIN GM 1991
- Lehikoinen, Pertti FIN GM 1985
- Koskinen, Olli FIN GM 1982
- Sorri, Juhani FIN GM 1982
- Palmo, Pentti FIN GM 1980
- Kauranen, Risto FIN GM 1977

== Senior International Masters ==
- Ylönen, Olli FIN SIM 2014
- Koskela, Taisto FIN SIM 2012
- Salmi, Ilkka FIN SIM 2010
- Siikaluoma, Auno FIN SIM 2010
- Peuraniemi, Pertti FIN SIM 2009
- Mannermaa, Jari FIN SIM 2007
- Arppi, Heikki FIN SIM 2006
- Fröberg, Harri FIN SIM 2003
- Harald, Olav FIN SIM 2003
- Neuvonen, Olavi FIN SIM 2003
- Parkkinen, Jyrki FIN SIM 2003
- Pigg, Heikki FIN SIM 2003
- Pukkila, Markku FIN SIM 2003
- Jäderholm, Bo FIN SIM 2002
- Oikamo, Teijo FIN SIM 2002
- Hesse, Günter FIN SIM 2001
- Backlund, Åke FIN SIM 1999
- Binham, Timothy FIN SIM 1999
- Ebeling, Mika FIN SIM 1999

== International Masters ==
- Ylönen, Olli FIN IM 2013
- Muukkonen, Kimmo FIN IM 2011
- Kauppinen, Martti FIN IM 2011
- Laine, Panu FIN IM 2011
- Siikaluoma, Auno FIN IM 2010
- Salmi, Ilkka FIN IM 2009
- Kolehmainen, Kari FIN IM 2004
- Koskela, Taisto FIN IM 2004
- Brusila, Heikki FIN IM 2003
- Halme, Olavi FIN IM 2003
- Huuskonen, Matti FIN IM 2003
- Ketola, Ville FIN IM 2003
- Sopanen, Pekka FIN IM 2003
- Juntunen, Reijo FIN IM 2002
- Karjalainen, Pekka FIN IM 2001
- Tuominen, Mauri FIN IM 2001
- Hietanen, Pauli FIN IM 2000
- Peuraniemi, Pertti FIN IM 1999
- Rissanen, Heikki FIN IM 1999
- Huuskonen, Veli-Matti FIN IM 1998
- Klemettinen, Pentti FIN IM 1998
- Mannermaa, Dr. Jari FIN IM 1998
- Söderberg, Kaj FIN IM 1998
- Välkesalmi, Kimmo FIN IM 1998
- Johansson, Clas-Erik FIN IM 1997
- Kauppala, Pekka FIN IM 1997
- Lehto, Arto FIN IM 1997
- Sutela, Raimo FIN IM 1997
- Pitkäranta, Tauno FIN IM 1996
- Raivio, Pertti FIN IM 1996
- Saarenpää, Toivo FIN IM 1996
- Airas, Olavi FIN IM 1995
- Nyman, Karl FIN IM 1995
- Salokangas, Hannu FIN IM 1994
- Lempiäinen, Lauri FIN IM 1993
- Tolonen, Leo Toivovich FIN IM 1992
- Piuva, Matti FIN IM 1990
- Räty, Sakari FIN IM 1990
- Wikman, Ragnar FIN IM 1987
- Kanko, Ilkka FIN IM 1984
- Hintikka, Eero FIN IM 1983
- Kaunonen, Kalevi FIN IM 1983
- Ojanen, Kaarle FIN IM 1981
- Lågland, Göran FIN IM 1975
- Venäläinen, Unto FIN IM 1973

== Lady International Master ==
- Ristoja-Lehtimäki, Mrs. Aulikki FIN LIM 1998

== International Arbiters ==
- Johansson, Clas-Erik FIN IA 1997
- Halme, Olavi FIN IA 1991
- Lahdenmäki, Leo FIN IA 1989
- Brusila, Heikki FIN IA 1982
- Jantunen, Olli FIN IA 1980
- Nuutilainen, Esko FIN IA 1975
- Wikman, Ragnar FIN IA 1975
- Harju, Antero FIN IA 1974
- Lindroos, Raimo FIN IA 1971
