= Rey Enigma =

Spanish chess player

Personal information
- Nationality: Spanish
- Occupation: Chess player

TikTok information
- Page: rey.enigma
- Followers: 3.1 million

YouTube information
- Channel: Rey Enigma
- Years active: 2021–present
- Subscribers: 2.1 million

Rey Enigma is a Spanish chess player, content creator, and author of unknown identity. He has played matches against important figures in chess such as Garry Kasparov, Anatoly Karpov, Magnus Carlsen, Hikaru Nakamura, Judit Polgár, Alexandra Kosteniuk and Levy Rozman.

He has over 3 million followers on TikTok, and over 2.1 million subscribers on his main YouTube channel. He also runs a separate English-language YouTube channel, Rey Enigma EN, which has about 49,000 subscribers.

== Career ==
Rey Enigma began publishing chess content online in 2021. He has said that TikTok was where his success started, and by January 2022 he had over 700,000 followers on the platform. He also launched his own website with instructive chess videos. He has been reported to spend much of his time in Madrid, where he produces his videos, and he offers his own line of chess courses in Spanish.

In addition to publishing content on social media, he makes public appearances on the street, in schools, at tournaments, and other places, where he plays matches against members of the public. In November 2021, he challenged players at Xperience Parque Rioja in La Rioja.

In December 2021, he appeared in the grand final of Got Talent España, where he played a match against Anatoly Karpov. The match, played at blitz time controls, ended in a draw. Karpov's flag fell in a position where Rey Enigma lacked sufficient material to checkmate him. The match was watched by 2.5 million people.

In January 2022, he travelled to New York City, primarily to meet and play Levy Rozman (GothamChess), and visited places including the Marshall Chess Club. Their friendly blitz match ended 2–2, and Rey Enigma then won a rematch for $1,000 by a score of 3–1.

About seven months after the Karpov match, he played Garry Kasparov in person, which he described as a long-held dream.

In 2023, he took part in the second Chess Festival in Panama, where the winners of each category in the tournament earned the chance to play against him.

== Identity ==
Rey Enigma keeps his identity a secret by wearing a mask and a black and white checkered costume, resembling a chessboard, and a voice changer.

However, in interviews he has given some details about his life. He has stated that he learned chess from his grandfather at the age of 5. He has also said that he is a "professional player who decided to put on the disguise to promote this sport and its values", and that he continues to participate in tournaments under his real identity.

He has also disclosed that he used to work in digital marketing but resigned from his job in September 2021, and that only eight people in the world know his age. He has said that after leaving his job he committed fully to the persona and was surprised by how quickly it grew. He has also said that he closes his eyes when photographed so that his face stays hidden, and that he worked more than 14–15 hours a day after starting the project. Rey Enigma also said, that the constume was originally designed by his mother. There has been speculation that Rey Enigma could be David Antón Guijarro, David Martínez, Miguel Santos Ruiz, or Roi Reinaldo.

== Works ==
- Método Enigma. ALFAGUARA. 2022. ISBN 9788419191045.
