= José Luis Aguilera Rico =

Mexican politician

- Born: 17 February 1979 (age 47); Querétaro, Mexico
- Occupation: Politician
- Political party: MC

José Luis Aguilera Rico (born 17 February 1979) is a Mexican politician from the Citizens' Movement. From 2006 to 2009 he served as Deputy of the LX Legislature of the Mexican Congress representing Querétaro.
