= Alberts Melnbārdis =

Latvian chess player (1888–1957)

Personal information
- Born: 28 June 1888 Aiviekste Parish, Governorate of Livonia
- Died: 6 August 1957 (aged 69) Rochester, United States

Chess career
- Country: Russian Empire; Latvia; United States

Alberts Melnbārdis (28 June 1888 – 6 August 1957) was a Latvian chess player.

== Biography ==
Alberts Melnbārdis graduated in law from University of Tartu. During the Latvian War of Independence he served as commander's assistant to Riga railway junction, then for many years worked as Legal Adviser to Latvian Railways Administration and Latvian Ministry of Transport Department of Highways and Roads.

Alberts Melnbārdis has become known as an active public person in the sports organization. Initially he was active in the Latvian Weightlifting Federation foundation and also he was chairman of this organization. At the age of 29, Alberts Melnbārdis learned to play chess and quickly became a good player. In 1922 he won the Riga Chess Club Tournament. In 1928, Alberts Melnbārdis participated in the 2nd Chess Olympiad in The Hague, where he played only one game. In 1935, he defeated the World Chess Champion Alexander Alekhine in a simultaneous game session. From 1933 to 1938 Alberts Melnbārdis led the Latvian Chess Union. During his activities, he has organized two international chess tournaments in Ķemeri (1937, 1939), as well as significantly increased chess life in Latvia. Alberts Melnbārdis was also the editor-in-chief of the chess magazine Šacha māksla (1937-39). During World War II, he worked for the Ostland's Department of Physical Education and Sports, where he was responsible for chess.

In 1944, Alberts Melnbārdis went as refugees to Germany. He was also active in exile sport life. In the spring of 1947, in Göttingen he was one of the founders of the Latvian Olympic Committee in exile who wanted to ensure the participation of Latvian athletes in 1948 Summer Olympics. Later Alberts Melnbārdis moved to United States. He worked as a lawyer there and continued to practice chess by participating in correspondence chess tournaments. He died of heart disease.
