= Hoyos de Miguel Muñoz =

- Municipality
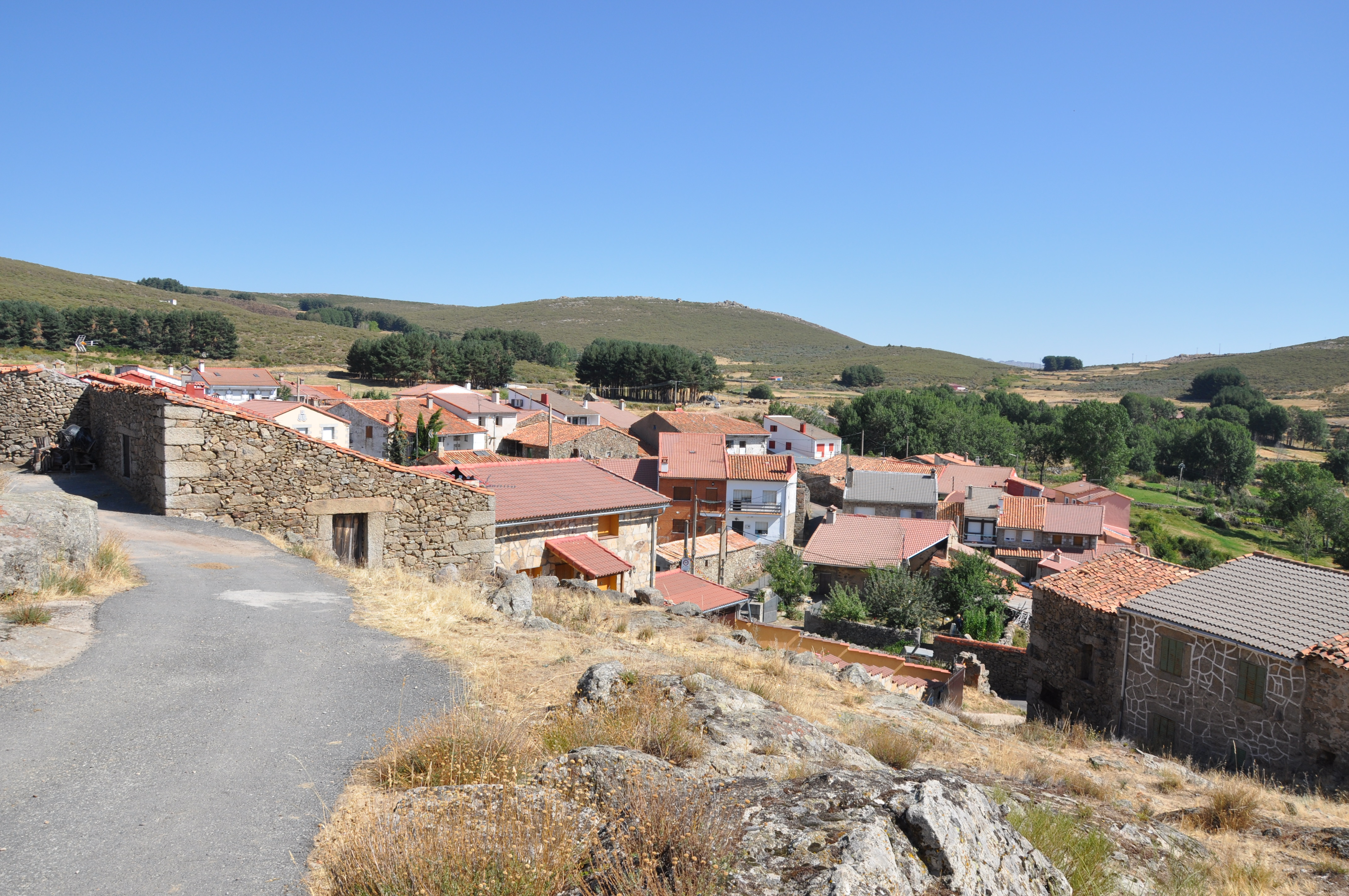
- Hoyos de Miguel Muñoz Avila.
- Flag Coat of arms
- Location in Spain. Hoyos de Miguel Muñoz (Castile and León)
- Coordinates: 40°23′32″N 5°04′02″W
- Country: Spain
- Autonomous community: Castile and León
- Province: Ávila
- Municipality: Hoyos de Miguel Muñoz

Area
  - Total: 11 km^{2} (4.2 sq mi)

Population (2025-01-01)
  - Total: 24
  - Density: 2.2/km^{2} (5.7/sq mi)
- Time zone: UTC+1 (CET)
  - Summer (DST): UTC+2 (CEST)
- Website: Official website

Hoyos de Miguel Muñoz is a municipality located in the province of Ávila, Castile and León, Spain.

At 1,534 meters elevation, Hoyos de Miguel Muñoz is the highest peak in the province of Ávila and the 6th highest in Spain.

== Population ==
Historical population
Year	Pop.	±% p.a.
2023	27	—
2024	27	+0.00%
2025	24	−11.11%
Source: INE
