= José Aguilera (footballer) =

Chilean footballer (born 2000)

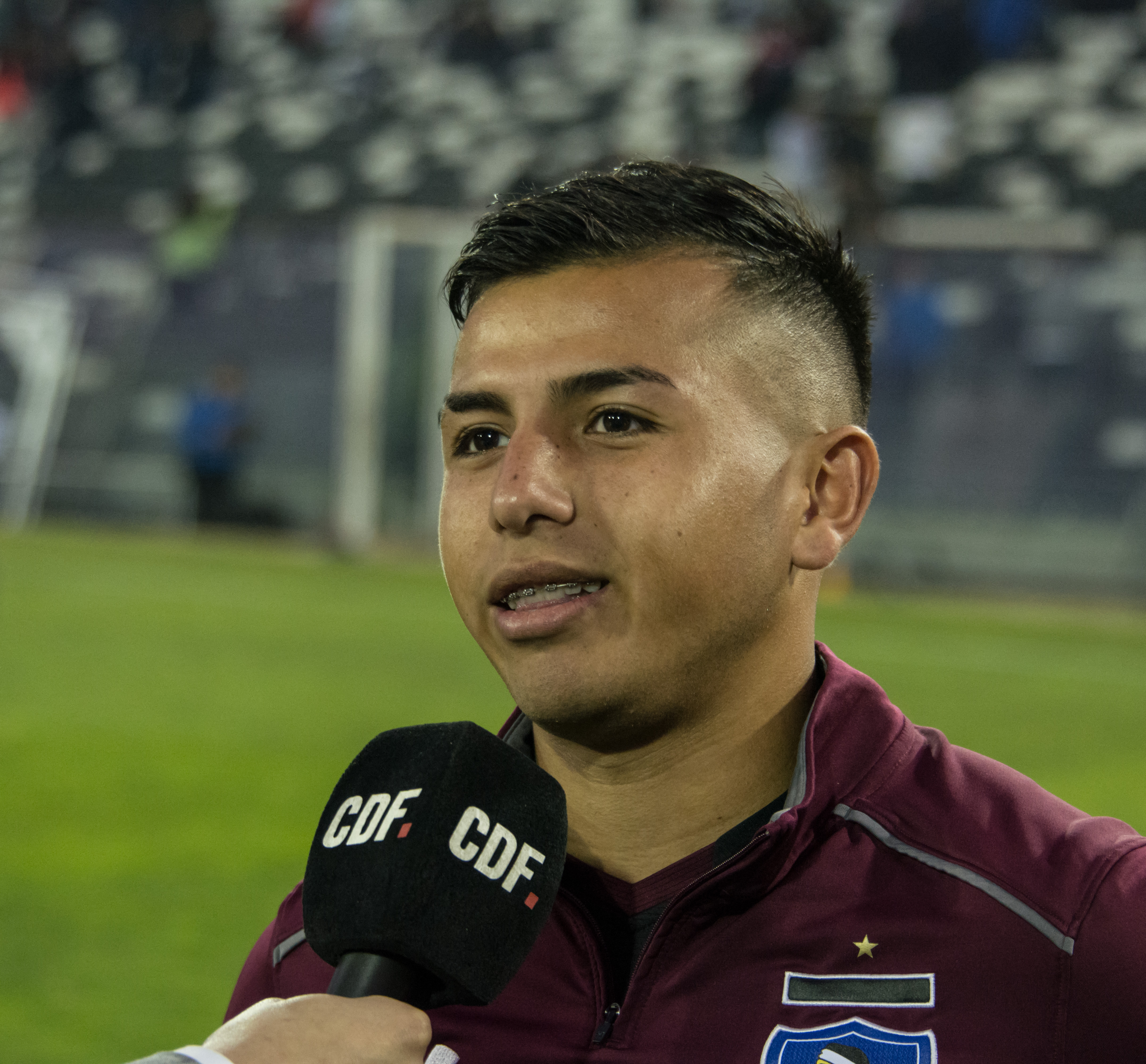
- Aguilera with Colo-Colo in 2018

Personal information
- Full name: José Matías Aguilera Tapia
- Date of birth: 31 January 2000 (age 26)
- Place of birth: Combarbalá, Chile
- Height: 1.67 m (5 ft 6 in)
- Position: Winger

Youth career
- Colo-Colo

Senior career*
Years	Team	Apps	(Gls)
2018–2020	Colo-Colo	4	(0)
2019	→ Deportes Puerto Montt (loan)	9	(0)
2020	→ San Marcos (loan)	3	(1)
2020–2021	Coquimbo Unido	28	(2)
2022	Barnechea	4	(1)
2025	Cultural Maipú	–	(–)

International career^{‡}
2015	Chile U15		
- * Club domestic league appearances and goals as of 4 May 2025 ‡ National team caps and goals as of 18 February 2015

José Matías Aguilera Tapia (born 31 January 2000) is a Chilean footballer who plays as a winger.

== Club career ==
Aguilera retired in 2022 after testing positive for cocaine and ecstasy. He returned to the activity by signing with Cultural Maipú in the Chilean Tercera B on 30 April 2025.

== International career ==
At early age, Aguilera represented Chile at under-15 level at the 2015 South American U-15 Championship and winning the friendly 2015 Aspire Tri-Series International Tournament in Doha, Qatar.

== Honours ==
Coquimbo Unido

- Primera B: 2021

Chile U15

- Aspire Tri-Series International Tournament: 2015
