= Arpad Elo =

American-Hungarian physicist (1903–1992)

- Born: Élő Árpád Imre; August 25, 1903; Egyházaskesző, Kingdom of Hungary
- Died: November 5, 1992 (aged 89); Brookfield, Wisconsin, U.S.
- Education: University of Chicago
- Known for: Elo rating system
- Scientific career
- Fields: Physics
- Workplaces: Marquette University

Arpad Emmerich Elo (né Élő Árpád Imre; August 25, 1903 – November 5, 1992) was a Hungarian-American physics professor who created the Elo rating system for two-player games such as chess.

Born in Egyházaskesző, Kingdom of Hungary, he moved to the United States with his parents in 1913. He obtained his BSc and MSc degrees in 1925 and 1928 from the University of Chicago, where he also played chess in the Chicago Chess League. From 1926 until his retirement in 1969, Elo was a physics instructor at Marquette University in Milwaukee. By the 1930s, he was the strongest chess player in Milwaukee, at the time one of the nation's leading chess cities. He won the Wisconsin State Championship eight times, and was the 11th person inducted into the World Chess Hall of Fame. He also served as the president of American Chess Federation (predecessor of United States Chess Federation) for terms 1935 and 1936. Elo died of a heart attack at his home in Brookfield, Wisconsin, on November 5, 1992.

== Elo rating system ==
Elo is known for his chess player rating system. The original player rating system was developed in 1950 by Kenneth Harkness, the Business Manager of the United States Chess Federation. By 1960, using the data developed through the Harkness Rating System, Elo developed his own formula, which had a sound statistical basis and constituted an improvement on the Harkness System. The new rating system was approved and passed at a meeting of the United States Chess Federation in St. Louis in 1960.

In 1970, FIDE, the World Chess Federation, agreed to adopt the Elo Rating System. From then on until the mid-1980s, Elo himself made the rating calculations. At the time, the computational task was relatively easy because fewer than 2000 players were rated by FIDE. FIDE reassigned the task of managing and computing the ratings to others, excluding Elo. FIDE also added new "Qualification for Rating" rules to its handbook awarding arbitrary ratings (typically in the 2200 range, which is the low end for a chess master) for players who scored at least 50 percent in the games played at selected events, such as named Chess Olympiads.

== Book ==
- The Rating of Chess Players, Past and Present (First Edition 1978, Second Edition 1986), Arco. ISBN 0-668-04721-6.
