= Miguel Muñoz Pantoja =

Peruvian chess grandmaster (born 1975)

Personal information
- Born: 30 November 1975 (age 50) Junín, Peru

Chess career
- Country: Peru (until 2012; since 2021); Spain (2012–2021)
- Title: Grandmaster (2012)
- Peak rating: 2519 (September 2019)

Miguel Muñoz Pantoja (born 30 November 1975) is a Peruvian chess Grandmaster.

== Chess career ==
Muñoz Pantoja finished runner-up in the Spanish Chess Championship in 2012, behind Julen Luis Arizmendi Martínez. He won the Catalan Chess Championship once, in 2012, and was runner-up once, in 2005.

He also won the Catalan Rapid Chess Championship once, in 2010, and finished runner-up twice, in 2006 and 2009. In Spain, he won the Martorell Open in 2008; finished runner-up in the Santa Coloma de Queralt International Rapid Open in 2005; and finished runner-up in the Villa de Sitges International Open in 2005 and 2011.

== See also ==
- Chess in Spain
