= Carlos Rodríguez Lafora =

Spanish chess player

Personal information
- Born: 10 July 1884 Valencia, Spain
- Died: 19 April 1966 (aged 81) Paterna, Spain

Chess career
- Country: Spain

Carlos Rodríguez Lafora (10 July 1884 – 19 April 1966) was a Spanish chess player and chess composer.

== Biography ==
Carlos Lafora worked as a medical doctor and surgeon. He was one of the strongest chess players in Spain at the turn of the 1920s and 1930s. In 1921, Lafora ranked 3rd in chess tournament in Zaragoza. Carlos Lafora was famous for his collection of more than 18,000 endgame studies. Based on his collection Carlos Lafora wrote two books: Finales de ajedrez (Alfiles en casillas de distinto color) (1963) and Dos caballos en combate (1965). He was International Arbiter of the FIDE for chess compositions since 1960.

Lafora played for Spain in the Chess Olympiad:

- In 1930, at third board in the 3rd Chess Olympiad in Hamburg (+1, =3, -9).
