= Juhani Olamo =

Finnish philatelist (1940–2010)

Juhani Veijo Olamo (c. 1940 – 1 September 2010) was a Finnish philatelist who was appointed to the Roll of Distinguished Philatelists in 1997 and was a Fellow of the Royal Philatelic Society London.

He was an expert on the postage stamps of Finland and the revenue stamps of Ecuador. He was the first president of the Revenue Commission of the Fédération Internationale de Philatélie.

== Publications ==
- Finish Philatelic Literature, 1979–82. (A bibliography in five parts)
- The Finnish Tete-Beches 1865-1885, 1985.
- The Revenue Stamps of Ecuador, YLE, Monistuspalvelu, Helsinki, 1994. ISBN 952-90-6121-8
- Postal Censorship in Finland 1914-17.
- Finnish Postal Cancellations of the two-ring type.

== See also ==
- Postage stamps and postal history of Finland
