= Birger Axel Rasmusson =

Finnish chess player

Personal information
- Born: 19 June 1901
- Died: 3 May 1964 (aged 62)

Chess career
- Country: Finland

Birger Axel Rasmusson (19 June 1901 – 3 May 1964) was a Finnish chess player, Finnish Chess Championship winner (1933).

== Biography ==
From the late 1920s to the late 1930s, Birger Axel Rasmusson was one of Finland's leading chess players. In 1933, he won the title of Finnish Chess Champion in a match against Ragnar Krogius – 6½ : 3½, but lost that title a year later in a match against Eero Böök – 3½ : 5½.

Birger Axel Rasmusson known for his victory over Paul Keres at the 1935 Chess Olympiad (in the same year, Keres took revenge at the tournament in Helsinki).

Birger Axel Rasmusson played for Finland in the Chess Olympiads:

- In 1927, at second board in the 1st Chess Olympiad in London (+2, =10, -3),
- In 1930, at first board in the 3rd Chess Olympiad in Hamburg (+2, =4, -7),
- In 1935, at second board in the 6th Chess Olympiad in Warsaw (+4, =4, -9).
