= Marc Narciso Dublan =

Spanish chess grandmaster (born 1974)

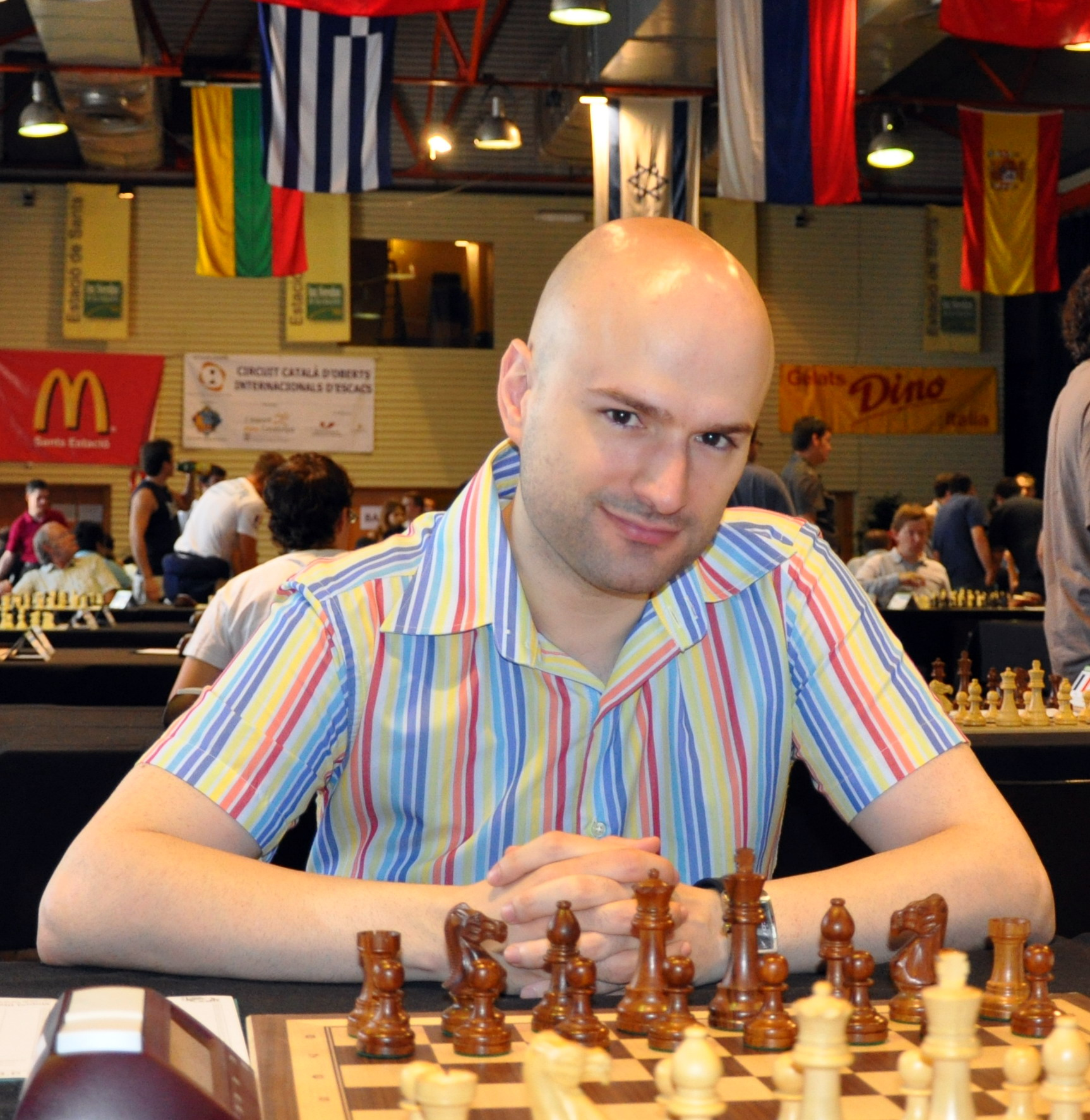
- Marc Narciso Dublan in 2010

Personal information
- Born: 20 January 1974 (age 52) Barcelona, Spain

Chess career
- Country: Spain
- Title: Grandmaster (2003)
- Peak rating: 2553 (July 2009)

Marc Narciso Dublan (born 20 January 1974) is a Spanish chess grandmaster.

== Biography ==
In 1987 and 1988, Marc Narciso Dublan twice won silver medal in Spanish Youth Chess Championship in the U14 age group. He three times won Catalan Chess Championships: in 1992, in 1995, and in 2011.

Marc Narciso Dublan has participated in international chess tournaments many times and won or shared 1 st place in Ibi (1996), La Pobla de Lillet (1999), Budapest (First Saturday tournament, 2001), Mondariz (2002), Barberà del Vallès (2005), Montcada i Reixac (2006), Varbera del Valles (2006), Barcelona (2006), Manresa (2007), Illes Medes (2008), San Sebastián (2009), Konya (2009).

Marc Narciso Dublan played for Spain in the Chess Olympiad:

- In 2006, at second reserve board in the 37th Chess Olympiad in Turin (+3, =4, -1).

Marc Narciso Dublan played for Spain in the European Team Chess Championships:

- In 2001, at reserve board in the 13th European Team Chess Championship in León (+0, =2, -3),
- In 2007, at reserve board in the 16th European Team Chess Championship in Heraklion (+0, =2, -3).

In 1997, he was awarded the FIDE International Master (IM) title and received the FIDE Grandmaster (GM) title six years later.
