= Kari Juhani Sorri =

Finnish chess player (1941–2024)

Personal information
- Born: 25 October 1941
- Died: 5 March 2024 (aged 82)

Chess career
- Country: Finland
- Title: FIDE Master (1990); ICCF Grandmaster (1982)
- Peak rating: 2360 (July 1991)

Kari Juhani Sorri (25 October 1941 – 5 March 2024) was a Finnish chess FIDE master (FM), International Correspondence Chess Grandmaster (1982), Finnish Chess Championship medalist (1972).

== Biography ==
From the end of 1960s to the mid-1970s, Kari Juhani Sorri was one of Finland's leading chess players. In 1972, in Finnish Chess Championships he has won silver medal.

Kari Juhani Sorri played for Finland in the Chess Olympiad:

- In 1972, at fourth board in the 20th Chess Olympiad in Skopje (+7, =5, -2).

Sorri played for Finland in the European Team Chess Championship preliminaries:

- In 1973, at fourth board in the 5th European Team Chess Championship preliminaries (+0, =2, -3).

Sorri played for Finland in the World Student Team Chess Championships:

- In 1967, at second board in the 14th World Student Team Chess Championship in Harrachov (+4, =3, -4).

Sorri played for Finland in the Nordic Chess Cup:

- In 1989, at fourth board in the 12th Nordic Chess Cup in Aabybro (+2, =1, -4).

In later years, Sorri actively participated in correspondence chess tournaments. He participated with Finland team in 10th Correspondence Chess Olympiad (1987–1995). In 1982, Kari Juhani Sorri won a tournament organized by the Finnish Correspondence Chess Federation. For this success, he was awarded the title of ICCF Grandmaster.

Sorri died on 5 March 2024, at the age of 82.
