= Ángel Martín González (chess player) =

Spanish chess player

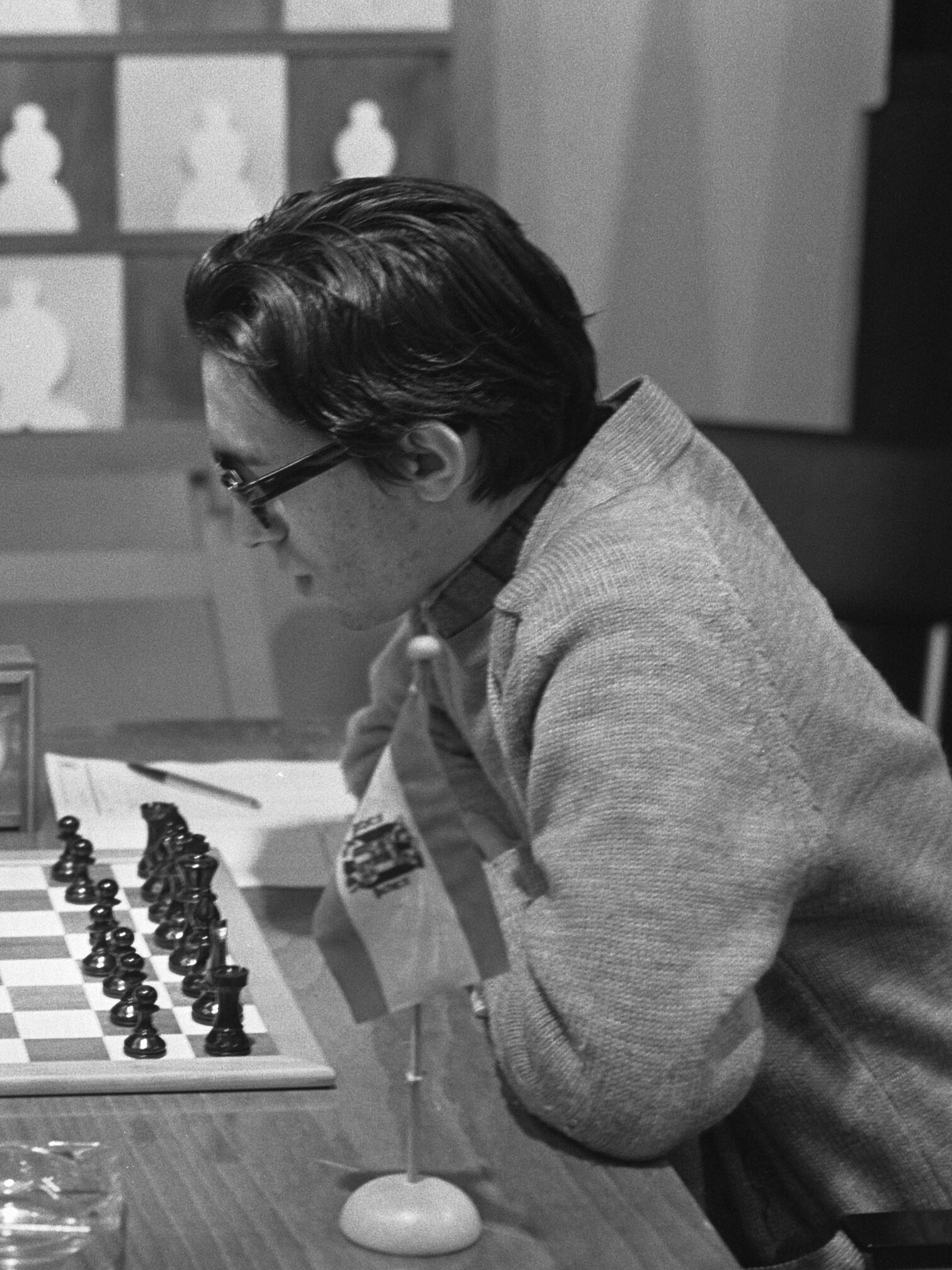
- Ángel Martín González in 1972

Personal information
- Born: 3 January 1953 (age 73) Barcelona, Spain

Chess career
- Country: Spain
- Title: International Master (1981)
- Peak rating: 2465 (January 1987)

Ángel Martín González (born 3 January 1953), is a Spanish chess International Master (IM) (1981), four times Spanish Chess Championship winner (1976, 1984, 1986, 2000).

== Biography ==
Ángel Martín González has competed many times in the finals of Spanish Chess Championships, where winning four gold medals (Ceuta 1976, Barcelona 1984, La Roda 1986, Manresa 2000) and three silver medals (Salamanca 1972, Valencia 1974, Torrevieja 1979). He was also the champion (1971) and runner-up (1972) of Catalonia Junior Chess Championship and six times Catalan Chess Championship winner (1974, 1979, 1980, 1984, 1997, 2000) and two-time runner-up (1986, 1992). In 1987, he won the 2nd place in Spain Blitz Chess Championship.

In 1985 in Biel Ángel Martín González participated in the World Chess Championship Interzonal Tournament where ranked in 18th place.

Ángel Martín González has achieved several successes in international chess tournaments, including in Alicante (1977, shared 2nd place), Rome (1982, 1st place), Barcelona (1986, 1st place; 1988, 2nd place and 1991, shared 2nd place), Sant Cugat del Vallès (1994, shared 1st place) and in Sant Feliu de Guíxols (2000, shared 1st place).

Ángel Martín González played for Spain in the Chess Olympiads:

- In 1976, at third board in the 22nd Chess Olympiad in Haifa (+4, =3, -4),
- In 1982, at fourth board in the 25th Chess Olympiad in Lucerne (+2, =4, -3),
- In 1984, at fourth board in the 26th Chess Olympiad in Thessaloniki (+1, =5, -4),
- In 1986, at first reserve board in the 27th Chess Olympiad in Dubai (+3, =1, -3).

Ángel Martín González played for Spain in the Clare Benedict Chess Cups:

- In 1977, at reserve board in the 22nd Clare Benedict Chess Cup in Copenhagen (+4, =3, -0).

In 1981, he was awarded the FIDE International Master (IM) title.
