= Valentí Marín =

Spanish chess player (1872–1936)

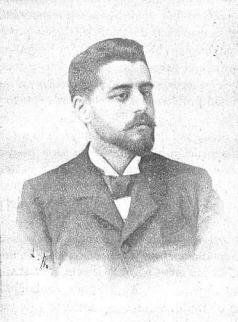
Valenti Marin

Valentí Marín i Llovet (17 January 1872 in Barcelona – 7 December 1936 in ididem) was a Catalan notary, chess writer and player.

He was on the Spanish team in the 1st unofficial Chess Olympiad of Paris, the 1st Chess Olympiad of London, the 2nd Chess Olympiad of The Hague, the 3rd Chess Olympiad of Hamburg, and the 4th Chess Olympiad in Prague. He was president of the Federación Española de Ajedrez (Chess Spanish Federation, FEDA).

== Works ==
- Un artista en ajedrez (Valentín Marín), 1913, bilingual edition in (Spanish / Esperanto)
