= Johannes Terho =

Finnish chess player

Personal information
- Born: 9 December 1885
- Died: 28 March 1961 (aged 75) Helsinki, Finland

Chess career
- Country: Finland

Johannes Terho (9 December 1885 – 28 March 1961) was a Finnish chess player, Finnish Chess Championship silver medalist (1922).

== Biography ==
Johannes Terho by education was a mathematician. He worked in the financial departments of various Finnish ministries. Since 1922 Terho served in Ministry of Defence. He rose to the position of chief accountant. Johannes Terho retired in 1952.

Johannes Terho participated in chess tournaments since 1911. In the 1922 Finnish Chess Championship, he competed with Anatol Tschepurnoff throughout the tournament. The result of the tournament was decided by their internecine party in the penultimate round. Tschepurnoff won and became the champion of the country. Terho finished the tournament in 2nd place.

Johannes Terho played for Finland in the Chess Olympiad:

- In 1927, at fourth board in the 1st Chess Olympiad in London (+2, =6, -7).

For a long time Johannes Terho collaborated with various newspapers and from 1924 to 1945 led the chess department in the newspaper Helsingin Sanomat.

At the end of his life, he was engaged in a chess composition. He compiled and published 30 problems. Some of Terho's problems fell into FIDE Album (FIDE rating 3.33).

Johannes Terho was vice president of the Finnish Chess Federation. In 1947, he was awarded the silver medal of the Finnish Chess Federation.
