= Ragnar Krogius =

Finnish chess player

Personal information
- Born: 17 March 1903 Jääski, Russia
- Died: 31 December 1980 (aged 77) Stockholm, Sweden

Chess career
- Country: Finland

Ragnar Krogius (17 March 1903 – 31 December 1980) was a Finnish chess player, Finnish Chess Championship winner (1932).

== Biography ==
From the begin of 1930s to the late 1940s, Ragnar Krogius was one of Finland's leading chess players. In 1932, he won the title of Finnish Chess Champion in a match against Eero Böök – 7 : 3, but lost that title a year later in a match against Birger Axel Rasmusson – 3½ : 6½.

Ragnar Krogius played for Finland in the Chess Olympiads:

- In 1930, at second board in the 3rd Chess Olympiad in Hamburg (+3, =2, -10),
- In 1935, at fourth board in the 6th Chess Olympiad in Warsaw (+4, =6, -7).

Ragnar Krogius played for Finland in the unofficial Chess Olympiad:

- In 1936, at second reserve board in the 3rd unofficial Chess Olympiad in Munich (+5, =5, -8).
