= Hipolito Asis Gargatagli =

Spanish chess grandmaster (born 1986)

Personal information
- Born: August 17, 1986 (age 39) Barcelona, Spain

Chess career
- Country: Spain
- Title: Grandmaster (2019)
- FIDE rating: 2463 (July 2026)
- Peak rating: 2538 (May 2018)

Hipolito Asis Gargatagli (born August 17, 1986 in Barcelona) is a Spanish chess player. He was FIDE Master at the age of 18 in the 2004. He got International Master title in 2006. In 2018, he was the Catalan Champion. He won 2 times against Anish Giri, one of them was with 2..a3 against the Sicilian Defense. FIDE awarded him Grandmaster title in the year 2019.

== Notable games ==
Tournament Name	ELO	Points
V Closed GM Barcelona Tournament 2021	2475	5.5
2nd Magistral Barbera Nov 2021	2502	6.0
TCh-ESP Div 1 Sept 2021	2475	4.0
ch-CAT Barcelona August 2021	2475	6.5
