= Louis Betbeder Matibet =

French chess player

Louis Betbeder Matibet (29 August 1901 – 5 May 1986) was a French chess master born in Orléans.

He took 2nd place in the French Chess Championships of 1928 and 1946.

Betbeder represented France seven times in Chess Olympiads (1927, 1928, 1930, 1931, 1933, 1935, and 1936), and won an individual silver medal in the 5th Chess Olympiad at Folkestone 1933.

He was awarded the International Arbiter title in 1967.
