= Jaime Lladó Lumbera =

Spanish chess player (1916–2001)

Personal information
- Born: 16 August 1916 Barcelona, Spain
- Died: 16 April 2001 Barcelona, Spain

Chess career
- Country: Spain

Jaime Lladó Lumbera (16 August 1916 — 16 April 2001) was a Spanish chess player, two-times Spanish Chess Championship winner (1956, 1961), five-times Catalan Chess Championship winner (1951, 1952, 1955, 1956, 1967).

== Biography ==
In the 1950s and 1960s, Jaime Lladó Lumbera was among the best Spanish players. In 1956 and 1961, he won the Spanish Chess Championship, but in 1955 in the final tournament, he ranked second place. Jaime Lladó Lumbera five times won Catalan Chess Championship: 1951, 1952, 1955, 1956, 1967, and three times won silver medals in this tournaments: 1959, 1961, 1966. Jaime Lladó Lumbera repeatedly competed in international chess tournaments and won tournament in Almería in 1957. Three times he participated in FIDE Zonal Chess tournaments (1957, 1962, 1963). He took 8th in the Gijon International Chess Tournament in 1956 (Larsen won).

Jaime Lladó Lumbera played for Spain in the Chess Olympiad:

- In 1958, at second reserve board in the 13th Chess Olympiad in Munich (+1, =2, -3).

Jaime Lladó Lumbera played for Spain in the European Team Chess Championships:

- In 1961, at sixt board in the 2nd European Team Chess Championship in Oberhausen (+3, =2, -5),
- In 1970, at first reserve board in the 4th European Team Chess Championship in Kapfenberg (+0, =2, -3).

Also Jaime Lladó Lumbera three times participated in Clare Benedict Chess Cup (1958-1959, 1963) and in team competition won two silver (1958, 1959), and in individual competition won gold (1958) medals.
