= Karl Ruben =

Danish chess player (1903–1938)

Personal information
- Born: 4 August 1903 Copenhagen, Denmark
- Died: 28 October 1938 (aged 35) Hareskov, Denmark

Chess career
- Country: Denmark
- Title: Chess master
- FIDE rating: 2536 (August 1930)
- Peak rating: 2536 (August 1930)
- Peak ranking: No. 45 (1930)
Medal record
Men's Chess Olympiad
Silver medal – second place	1927 London	Team

Karl Ruben (4 August 1903 – 28 October 1938) was a Danish chess master.

He won a match against Johannes Pedersen (1.5–0.5) at Aalborg 1927, tied for 2nd-3rd in Danish Championship at Vordingborg 1927 (Erik Andersen won), shared 2nd at Copenhagen 1927 (Politiken, Géza Maróczy won), tied for 5-6th at Copenhagen 1928 (Aron Nimzowitsch won), tied for 7-9th at Svendborg 1930 (DEN-ch, Andersen won), and won a simultan game against Alexander Alekhine at Copenhagen 1930.

Ruben played four times for Denmark in Chess Olympiads in 1927, 1928, 1930, 1931, and won team silver medal at London 1927.
