= Chess Olympiad =

Biennial international chess tournament

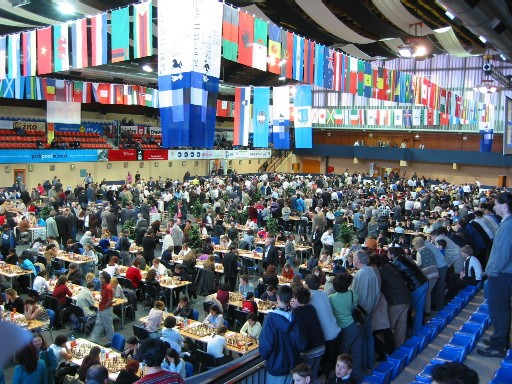
- 35th Chess Olympiad in Bled in October 2002
- Status: Active
- Genre: Sports event
- Frequency: Biennial
- Location: Various
- Inaugurated: 1924
- Previous event: 46th Chess Olympiad
- Next event: 47th Chess Olympiad
- Organiser: FIDE
- 46th Chess Olympiad

The Chess Olympiad is a biennial chess tournament in which teams representing nations of the world compete. FIDE organises the tournament and selects the host nation.

== History ==
The first Olympiad was unofficial. For the 1924 Olympics, an attempt was made to include chess in the Olympic Games but this failed because of problems with distinguishing between amateur and professional players. While the 1924 Summer Olympics was taking place in Paris, the 1st unofficial Chess Olympiad also took place in Paris. FIDE was formed on Sunday, July 20, 1924, the closing day of the 1st unofficial Chess Olympiad. A second unofficial chess Olympiad was held in Budapest in 1926, during the third FIDE Congress.

FIDE organised the first official Olympiad in 1927 which took place in London. Eight Olympiads were held irregular intervals from 1927 to 1939, when they were stopped due to World War II, then there were no further Olympiads until 1950.

Since 1950 they have been held regularly every two years. The only exception is that, during the COVID-19 pandemic, there was no 2020 Olympiad, but FIDE held an Online Chess Olympiad in 2020 and 2021, with a rapid time control that affected players' online ratings.

The first Women's Chess Olympiad was held in 1957. In 1972, and since 1976, the open and women's Olympiads have been held at the same time and venue.

Growth of Chess Olympiads

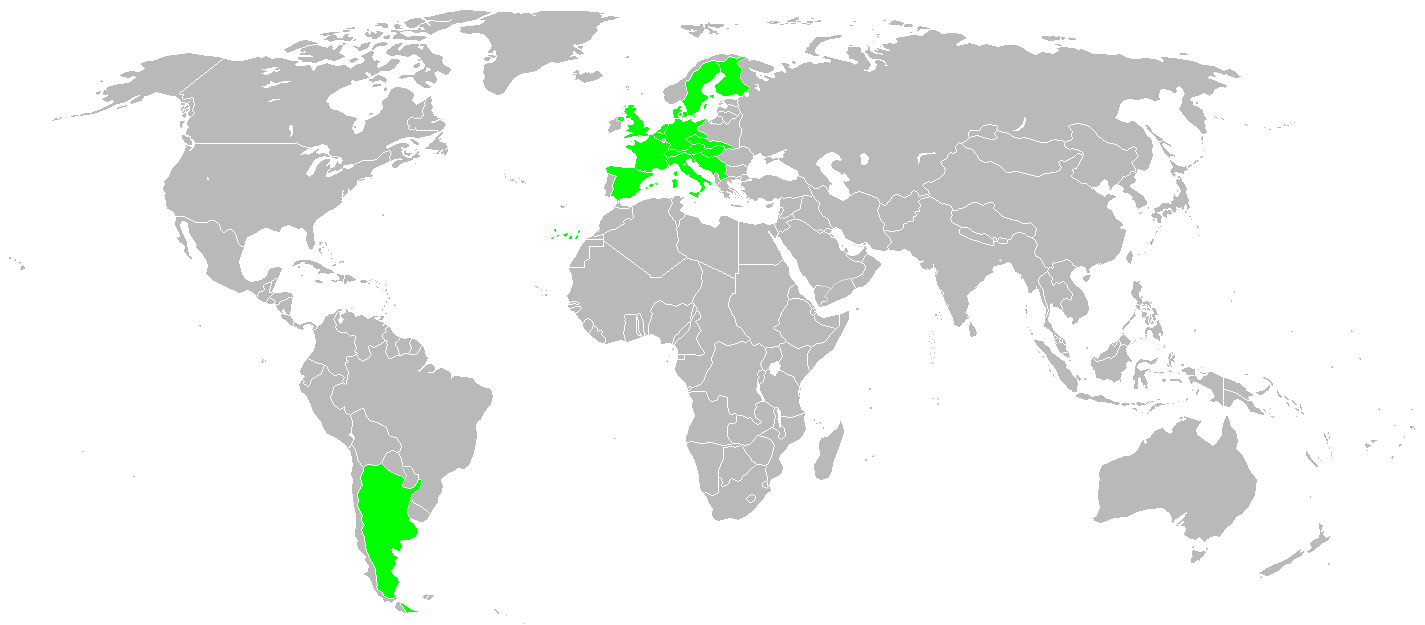
There were 16 participating nations in the 1st Chess Olympiad, 1927.

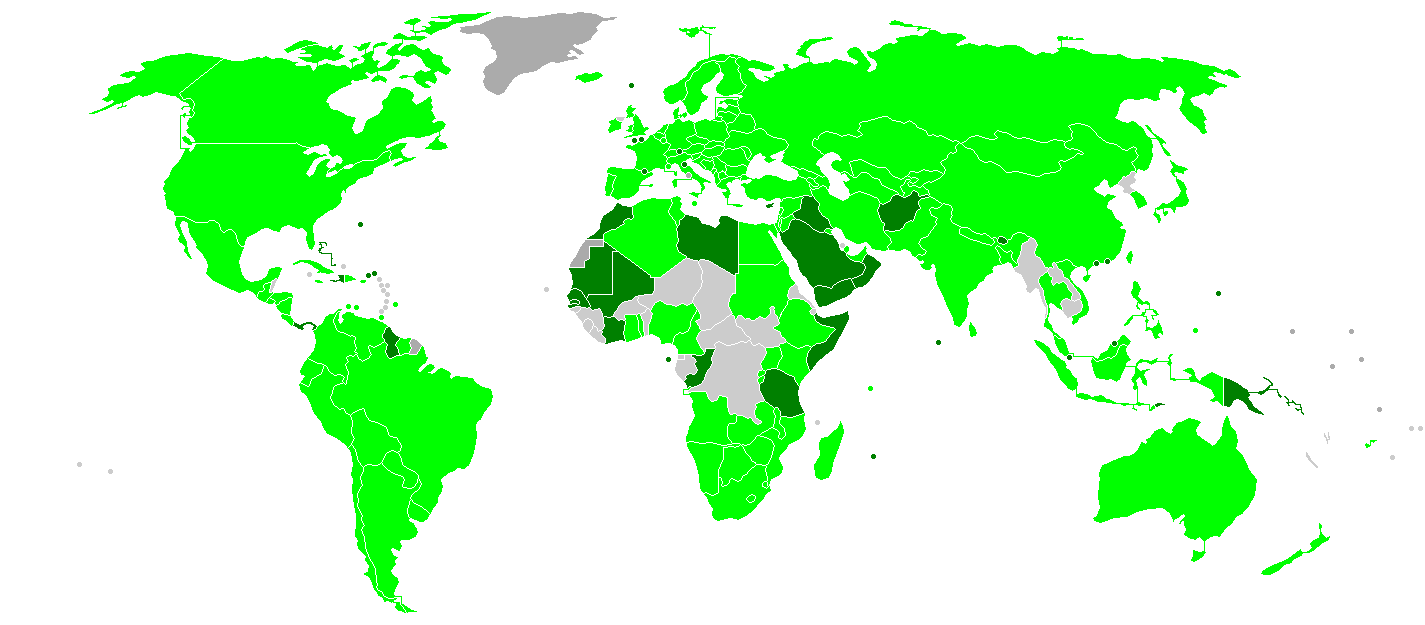
By the 41st Olympiad, 2014, there were 172 participating nations.

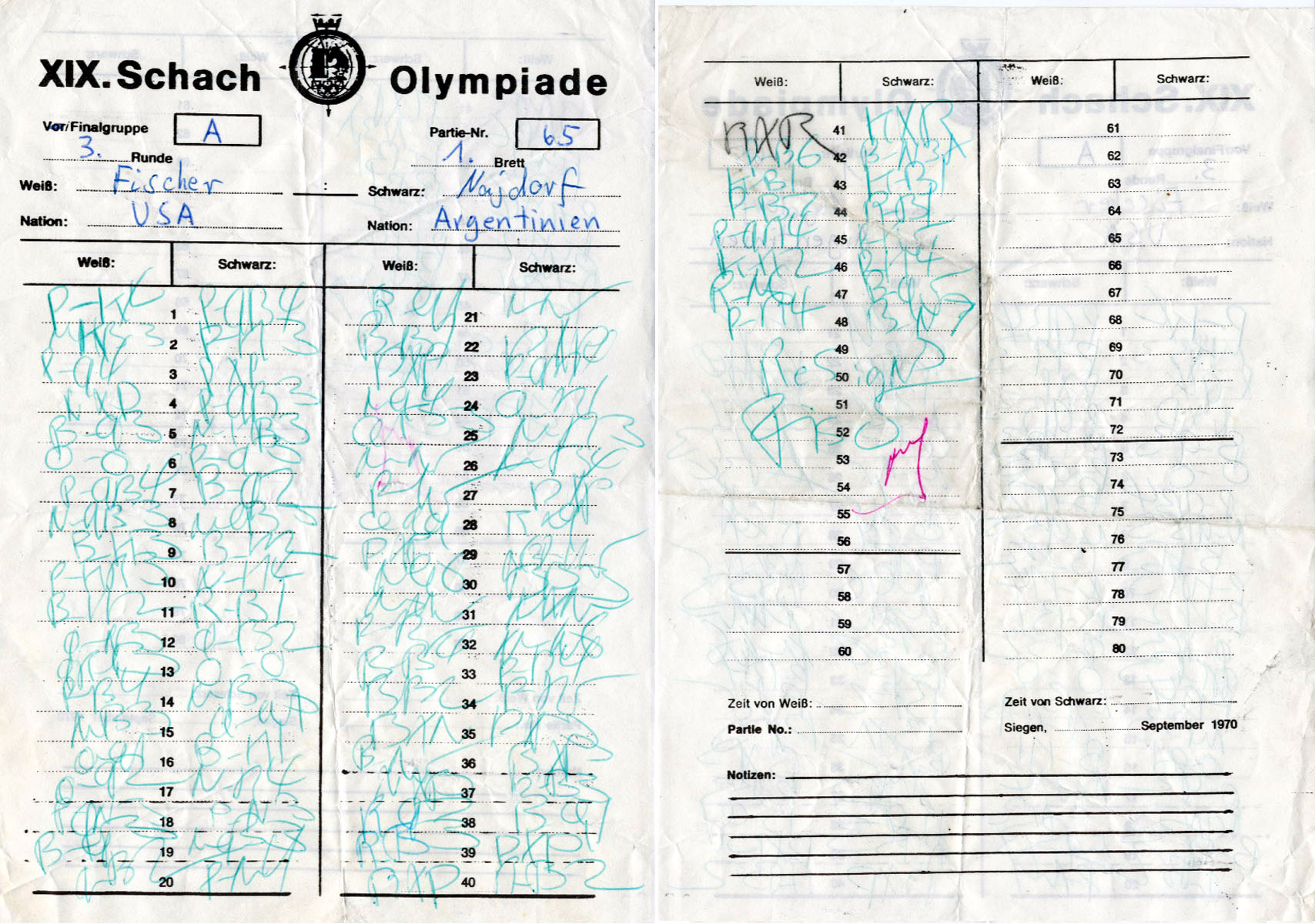
Bobby Fischer's score card from his round 3 game against Miguel Najdorf in the 1970 Chess Olympiad

== Competition ==
Each FIDE-recognized chess association can enter a team into the Olympiad. Each team is made of up to five players, four regular players and one reserve (prior to the tournament in Dresden 2008 there were two reserves).

Initially each team played all other teams but as the event grew over the years this became impossible. At first team seeding took place before the competition, with teams playing in preliminary groups and then finals. Later certain drawbacks were recognized with seeding and in 1976 a Swiss tournament system was adopted. Starting from 2008, the first criterion for determining ranking has been match points instead of board points. Teams score 2 points for a match win, 1 point for a drawn match and 0 points for a match loss.

There is a separate women's competition. Since 1976 it has been held at the same time and venue as the open event, with the two competitions comprising the Chess Olympiad. Before 2008 the team sizes were smaller than in the Open: teams of two in 1957; teams of two with one reserve from 1963 to 1974; and teams of three with one reserve from 1976 to 2006.

The trophy for the winning team in the open section is the Hamilton-Russell Cup, which was offered by the English magnate Frederick Hamilton-Russell as a prize for the 1st Olympiad (London 1927). The cup is kept by the winning team until the next event, when it is consigned to the next winner. The trophy for the winning women's team is known as the Vera Menchik Cup in honor of the first Women's World Chess Champion. Since FIDE has also awarded the #Gaprindashvili Cup, for the country with the best overall performance across both divisions.

=== Drug testing ===
As a sporting federation recognized by the IOC, and particularly as a signatory to the World Anti-Doping Agency (WADA) conventions, FIDE adheres to their rules, including a requirement for doping tests, which they are obligated to take at the events such as the Olympiad. The tests were first introduced in 2002 under significant controversy, with the widespread belief that it was impossible to dope in chess. Research carried out by the Dutch chess federation failed to find a single performance-enhancing substance for chess. According to Dr Helmut Pfleger, who has been conducting experiments in the field for around twenty years, "Both mentally stimulating and mentally calming medication have too many negative side effects". Players such as Artur Yusupov, Jan Timman and Robert Hübner either refused to play for their national team or to participate in events such as the Chess Olympiad where drug tests were administered. All 802 tests administered at the 2002 Olympiad came back negative. However, in the 36th Chess Olympiad in 2004, two players refused to provide urine samples and had their scores cancelled. Four years later, Vasyl Ivanchuk was not penalized for skipping a drug test at the 38th Chess Olympiad in 2008, with a procedural error being indicated instead.

In 2010, a FIDE official commented that due to the work of the FIDE Medical Commission, the tests were now considered routine. In November 2015, FIDE president Kirsan Ilyumzhinov announced they are working with WADA to define and identify doping in chess.

== Results ==
=== Open event ===
Host cities of chess olympiad outside Europe	Host cities of chess olympiad in Europe

Year	Event	Host	Gold	Silver	Bronze
1924	1st unofficial Chess Olympiad; The Chess Olympiad (individual)	Paris, France	Czechoslovakia 31; Karel Hromádka, Jan Schulz, Karel Vaněk, Karel Skalička	Hungary 30; Árpád Vajda, Károly Sterk, Endre Steiner, Kornél Havasi	Switzerland 29; Erwin Voellmy, Otto Zimmermann, Hans Johner, Oskar Naegeli
1926	2nd unofficial Chess Olympiad; The Team Tournament (part of FIDE summit)	Budapest, then part of the Kingdom of Hungary	Hungary 9 Endre Steiner, Árpád Vajda, Károly Sterk, György Négyesy, Elek Bakonyi, Sándor Zinner	Kingdom of Serbs, Croats and Slovenes 8 Boris Kostić, Lajos Asztalos, Stevan Ćirić, Imre György	Romania 5 János Balogh, Miklós Bródy, Alexandru Tyroler, Iosif Mendelssohn, Zeno Proca
1927	1st Chess Olympiad	London, United Kingdom	Hungary 40; Géza Maróczy, Géza Nagy, Árpád Vajda, Kornél Havasi, Endre Steiner	Denmark 38½; Orla Hermann Krause, Holger Norman-Hansen, Erik Andersen, Karl Ruben	England 36½; Henry Atkins, Fred Yates, George Thomas, Reginald Michell, Edmund Spencer
1928	2nd Chess Olympiad	The Hague, Netherlands	Hungary 44; Géza Nagy, Endre Steiner, Árpád Vajda, Kornél Havasi	United States 39½; Isaac Kashdan, Herman Steiner, Samuel Factor, Erling Tholfsen, Milton Hanauer	Poland 37; Kazimierz Makarczyk, Paulin Frydman, Teodor Regedziński, Mieczysław Chwojnik, Abram Blass
1930	3rd Chess Olympiad	Hamburg, then part of the Weimar Republic	Poland 48½; Akiba Rubinstein, Savielly Tartakower, Dawid Przepiórka, Kazimierz Makarczyk, Paulin Frydman	Hungary 47; Géza Maróczy, Sándor Takács, Árpád Vajda, Kornél Havasi, Endre Steiner	Germany 44½; Carl Ahues, Friedrich Sämisch, Carl Carls, Kurt Richter, Heinrich Wagner
1931	4th Chess Olympiad	Prague, then part of Czechoslovakia	United States 48; Isaac Kashdan, Frank Marshall, Arthur Dake, Israel Horowitz, Herman Steiner	Poland 47; Akiba Rubinstein, Savielly Tartakower, Dawid Przepiórka, Kazimierz Makarczyk, Paulin Frydman	Czechoslovakia 46½; Salo Flohr, Karl Gilg, Josef Rejfíř, Karel Opočenský, Karel Skalička
1933	5th Chess Olympiad	Folkestone, United Kingdom	United States 39; Isaac Kashdan, Frank Marshall, Reuben Fine, Arthur Dake, Albert Simonson	Czechoslovakia 37½; Salo Flohr, Karel Treybal, Josef Rejfíř, Karel Opočenský, Karel Skalička	Sweden 34; Gideon Ståhlberg, Gösta Stoltz, Erik Lundin, Karl Berndtsson
1935	6th Chess Olympiad	Warsaw, Poland	United States 54; Reuben Fine, Frank Marshall, Abraham Kupchik, Arthur Dake, Israel Horowitz	Sweden 52½; Gideon Ståhlberg, Gösta Stoltz, Erik Lundin, Gösta Danielsson, Ernst Larsson	Poland 52; Savielly Tartakower, Paulin Frydman, Mieczysław Najdorf, Henryk Friedman, Kazimierz Makarczyk
1936	3rd unofficial Chess Olympiad non-FIDE unofficial Chess Olympiad	Munich, then part of Nazi Germany	Hungary 110½; Géza Maróczy, Lajos Steiner, Endre Steiner, Kornél Havasi, László Szabó, Gedeon Barcza, Árpád Vajda, Ernő Gereben, János Balogh, Imre Korody	Poland 108; Paulin Frydman, Mieczysław Najdorf, Teodor Regedziński, Kazimierz Makarczyk, Henryk Friedman, Leon Kremer, Henryk Pogorieły, Antoni Wojciechowski, Franciszek Sulik, Jerzy Jagielski	Germany 106½; Kurt Richter, Carl Ahues, Ludwig Engels, Carl Carls, Ludwig Rellstab, Friedrich Sämisch, Ludwig Rödl, Herbert Heinicke, Wilhelm Ernst, Paul Michel
1937	7th Chess Olympiad	Stockholm, Sweden	United States 54½; Samuel Reshevsky, Reuben Fine, Isaac Kashdan, Frank Marshall, Israel Horowitz	Hungary 48½; Andor Lilienthal, László Szabó, Endre Steiner, Kornél Havasi, Árpád Vajda	Poland 47; Savielly Tartakower, Mieczysław Najdorf, Paulin Frydman, Izaak Appel, Teodor Regedziński
1939	8th Chess Olympiad	Buenos Aires, Argentina	Germany 36; Erich Eliskases, Paul Michel, Ludwig Engels, Albert Becker, Heinrich Reinhardt	Poland 35½; Savielly Tartakower, Mieczysław Najdorf, Paulin Frydman, Teodor Regedziński, Franciszek Sulik	Estonia 33½; Paul Keres, Ilmar Raud, Paul Schmidt, Gunnar Friedemann, Johannes Türn
1950	9th Chess Olympiad	Dubrovnik, then part of Yugoslavia	Yugoslavia 45½; Svetozar Gligorić, Vasja Pirc, Petar Trifunović, Braslav Rabar, Milan Vidmar Jr., Stojan Puc	Argentina 43½; Miguel Najdorf, Julio Bolbochán, Carlos Guimard, Héctor Rossetto, Hermann Pilnik	West Germany 40½; Wolfgang Unzicker, Lothar Schmid, Gerhard Pfeiffer, Ludwig Rellstab, Hans-Hilmar Staudte
1952	10th Chess Olympiad	Helsinki, Finland	Soviet Union 21; Paul Keres, Vasily Smyslov, David Bronstein, Efim Geller, Isaac Boleslavsky, Alexander Kotov	Argentina 19½; Miguel Najdorf, Julio Bolbochán, Erich Eliskases, Hermann Pilnik, Héctor Rossetto	Yugoslavia 19; Svetozar Gligorić, Braslav Rabar, Petar Trifunović, Vasja Pirc, Andrija Fuderer, Borislav Milić
1954	11th Chess Olympiad	Amsterdam, Netherlands	Soviet Union 34; Mikhail Botvinnik, Vasily Smyslov, David Bronstein, Paul Keres, Efim Geller, Alexander Kotov	Argentina 27; Miguel Najdorf, Julio Bolbochán, Oscar Panno, Carlos Guimard, Héctor Rossetto, Hermann Pilnik	Yugoslavia 26½; Vasja Pirc, Svetozar Gligorić, Petar Trifunović, Braslav Rabar, Andrija Fuderer, Aleksandar Matanović
1956	12th Chess Olympiad	Moscow, then part of the Soviet Union	Soviet Union 31; Mikhail Botvinnik, Vasily Smyslov, Paul Keres, David Bronstein, Mark Taimanov, Efim Geller	Yugoslavia 26½; Svetozar Gligorić, Aleksandar Matanović, Borislav Ivkov, Nikola Karaklajić, Borislav Milić, Božidar Đurašević	Hungary 26½; László Szabó, Gedeon Barcza, Pál Benkő, György Szilágyi, Miklós Bély, Lajos Portisch
1958	13th Chess Olympiad	Munich, then part of West Germany	Soviet Union 34½; Mikhail Botvinnik, Vasily Smyslov, Paul Keres, David Bronstein, Mikhail Tal, Tigran Petrosian	Yugoslavia 29; Svetozar Gligorić, Aleksandar Matanović, Borislav Ivkov, Petar Trifunović, Božidar Đurašević, Andrija Fuderer	Argentina 25½; Hermann Pilnik, Oscar Panno, Erich Eliskases, Rodolfo Redolfi, Raúl Sanguineti, Jaime Emma
1960	14th Chess Olympiad	Leipzig, then part of East Germany	Soviet Union 34; Mikhail Tal, Mikhail Botvinnik, Paul Keres, Viktor Korchnoi, Vasily Smyslov, Tigran Petrosian	United States 29; Bobby Fischer, William Lombardy, Robert Byrne, Arthur Bisguier, Nicolas Rossolimo, Raymond Weinstein	Yugoslavia 27; Svetozar Gligorić, Aleksandar Matanović, Borislav Ivkov, Mario Bertok, Mato Damjanović, Milan Vukčević
1962	15th Chess Olympiad	Varna, then part of the People's Republic of Bulgaria	Soviet Union 31½; Mikhail Botvinnik, Tigran Petrosian, Boris Spassky, Paul Keres, Efim Geller, Mikhail Tal	Yugoslavia 28; Svetozar Gligorić, Petar Trifunović, Aleksandar Matanović, Borislav Ivkov, Bruno Parma, Dragoljub Minić	Argentina 26; Miguel Najdorf, Julio Bolbochán, Oscar Panno, Raúl Sanguineti, Héctor Rossetto, Alberto Foguelman
1964	16th Chess Olympiad	Tel Aviv, Israel	Soviet Union 36½; Tigran Petrosian, Mikhail Botvinnik, Vasily Smyslov, Paul Keres, Leonid Stein, Boris Spassky	Yugoslavia 32; Svetozar Gligorić, Borislav Ivkov, Aleksandar Matanović, Bruno Parma, Mijo Udovčić, Milan Matulović	West Germany 30½; Wolfgang Unzicker, Klaus Darga, Lothar Schmid, Helmut Pfleger, Dieter Mohrlok, Wolfram Bialas
1966	17th Chess Olympiad	Havana, Cuba	Soviet Union 39½; Tigran Petrosian, Boris Spassky, Mikhail Tal, Leonid Stein, Viktor Korchnoi, Lev Polugaevsky	United States 34½; Bobby Fischer, Robert Byrne, Pal Benko, Larry Evans, William Addison, Nicolas Rossolimo	Hungary 33½; Lajos Portisch, László Szabó, István Bilek, Levente Lengyel, Győző Forintos, László Bárczay
1968	18th Chess Olympiad	Lugano, Switzerland	Soviet Union 39½; Tigran Petrosian, Boris Spassky, Viktor Korchnoi, Efim Geller, Lev Polugaevsky, Vasily Smyslov	Yugoslavia 31; Svetozar Gligorić, Borislav Ivkov, Aleksandar Matanović, Milan Matulović, Bruno Parma, Dragoljub Čirić	Bulgaria 30; Milko Bobotsov, Georgi Tringov, Nikola Padevsky, Atanas Kolarov, Ivan Radulov, Peicho Peev
1970	19th Chess Olympiad	Siegen, then part of West Germany	Soviet Union 27½; Boris Spassky, Tigran Petrosian, Viktor Korchnoi, Lev Polugaevsky, Vasily Smyslov, Efim Geller	Hungary 26½; Lajos Portisch, Levente Lengyel, István Bilek, Győző Forintos, István Csom, Zoltán Ribli	Yugoslavia 26; Svetozar Gligorić, Borislav Ivkov, Milan Matulović, Aleksandar Matanović, Bruno Parma, Dragoljub Minić
1972	20th Chess Olympiad	Skopje, then part of Yugoslavia	Soviet Union 42; Tigran Petrosian, Viktor Korchnoi, Vasily Smyslov, Mikhail Tal, Anatoly Karpov, Vladimir Savon	Hungary 40½; Lajos Portisch, István Bilek, Győző Forintos, Zoltán Ribli, István Csom, Gyula Sax	Yugoslavia 38; Svetozar Gligorić, Borislav Ivkov, Ljubomir Ljubojević, Aleksandar Matanović, Milan Matulović, Josip Rukavina
1974	21st Chess Olympiad	Nice, France	Soviet Union 46; Anatoly Karpov, Viktor Korchnoi, Boris Spassky, Tigran Petrosian, Mikhail Tal, Gennady Kuzmin	Yugoslavia 37½; Svetozar Gligorić, Ljubomir Ljubojević, Borislav Ivkov, Albin Planinc, Dragoljub Velimirović, Bruno Parma	United States 36½; Lubomir Kavalek, Robert Byrne, Walter Browne, Samuel Reshevsky, William Lombardy, James Tarjan
1976	22nd Chess Olympiad *	Haifa, Israel	United States 37; Robert Byrne, Lubomir Kavalek, Larry Evans, James Tarjan, William Lombardy, Kim Commons	Netherlands 36½; Jan Timman, Gennadi Sosonko, Jan Hein Donner, Hans Ree, Gert Ligterink, Franciscus Kuijpers	England 35½; Tony Miles, Raymond Keene, William Hartston, Michael Stean, Jonathan Mestel, John Nunn
1976	Against Chess Olympiad	Tripoli, Libya	El Salvador 38½; Antonio Grimaldi, René Grimaldi, Salvador Infante, Roberto Camacho, Boris Pineda, Manuel Velásquez	Tunisia 36; Slim Bouaziz, Ridha Belkadi, Ahmed Drira, Sbia	Pakistan 34½; Zahiruddin Farooqui, Rahat Ali, Nazir Ahmad, Shahzad Mirza, Gholam Mohiuddin, Shaikh Mazhar Hussain
1978	23rd Chess Olympiad	Buenos Aires, Argentina	Hungary 37; Lajos Portisch, Zoltán Ribli, Gyula Sax, András Adorján, István Csom, László Vadász	Soviet Union 36; Boris Spassky, Tigran Petrosian, Lev Polugaevsky, Boris Gulko, Oleg Romanishin, Rafael Vaganian	United States 35; Lubomir Kavalek, Walter Browne, Anatoly Lein, Robert Byrne, James Tarjan, William Lombardy
1980	24th Chess Olympiad	Valletta, Malta	Soviet Union 39; Anatoly Karpov, Lev Polugaevsky, Mikhail Tal, Efim Geller, Yuri Balashov, Garry Kasparov	Hungary 39; Lajos Portisch, Zoltán Ribli, Gyula Sax, István Csom, Iván Faragó, József Pintér	Yugoslavia 35; Ljubomir Ljubojević, Borislav Ivkov, Bruno Parma, Bojan Kurajica, Slavoljub Marjanović, Predrag Nikolić
1982	25th Chess Olympiad	Lucerne, Switzerland	Soviet Union 42½; Anatoly Karpov, Garry Kasparov, Lev Polugaevsky, Alexander Beliavsky, Mikhail Tal, Artur Yusupov	Czechoslovakia 36; Vlastimil Hort, Jan Smejkal, Ľubomír Ftáčnik, Vlastimil Jansa, Ján Plachetka, Jan Ambrož	United States 35½; Walter Browne, Yasser Seirawan, Lev Alburt, Lubomir Kavalek, James Tarjan, Larry Christiansen
1984	26th Chess Olympiad	Thessaloniki, Greece	Soviet Union 41; Alexander Beliavsky, Lev Polugaevsky, Rafael Vaganian, Vladimir Tukmakov, Artur Yusupov, Andrei Sokolov	England 37; Tony Miles, John Nunn, Jon Speelman, Murray Chandler, Jonathan Mestel, Nigel Short	United States 35; Roman Dzindzichashvili, Lubomir Kavalek, Larry Christiansen, Walter Browne, Lev Alburt, Nick de Firmian
1986	27th Chess Olympiad	Dubai, United Arab Emirates	Soviet Union 40; Garry Kasparov, Anatoly Karpov, Andrei Sokolov, Artur Yusupov, Rafael Vaganian, Vitaly Tseshkovsky	England 39½; Tony Miles, John Nunn, Nigel Short, Murray Chandler, Jon Speelman, Glenn Flear	United States 38½; Yasser Seirawan, Larry Christiansen, Lubomir Kavalek, John Fedorowicz, Nick de Firmian, Maxim Dlugy
1988	28th Chess Olympiad	Thessaloniki, Greece	Soviet Union 40½; Garry Kasparov, Anatoly Karpov, Artur Yusupov, Alexander Beliavsky, Jaan Ehlvest, Vassily Ivanchuk	England 34½; Nigel Short, Jon Speelman, John Nunn, Murray Chandler, Jonathan Mestel, William Watson	Netherlands 34½; John van der Wiel, Gennadi Sosonko, Paul van der Sterren, Jeroen Piket, Marinus Kuijf, Rudy Douven
1990	29th Chess Olympiad	Novi Sad, then part of Yugoslavia	Soviet Union 39; Vassily Ivanchuk, Boris Gelfand, Alexander Beliavsky, Artur Yusupov, Leonid Yudasin, Evgeny Bareev	United States 35½; Yasser Seirawan, Boris Gulko, Larry Christiansen, Joel Benjamin, John Fedorowicz, Nick de Firmian	England 35½; Nigel Short, Jon Speelman, John Nunn, Michael Adams, Murray Chandler, Julian Hodgson
1992	30th Chess Olympiad	Manila, Philippines	Russia 39; Garry Kasparov, Alexander Khalifman, Sergey Dolmatov, Alexey Dreev, Vladimir Kramnik, Alexey Vyzmanavin	Uzbekistan 35; Valery Loginov, Grigory Serper, Alexander Nenashev, Sergey Zagrebelny, Mihail Saltaev, Saidali Iuldachev	Armenia 34½; Rafael Vaganian, Vladimir Akopian, Smbat Lputian, Artashes Minasian, Arshak Petrosian, Ashot Anastasian
1994	31st Chess Olympiad	Moscow, Russia	Russia 37½; Garry Kasparov, Vladimir Kramnik, Evgeny Bareev, Alexey Dreev, Sergei Tiviakov, Peter Svidler	Bosnia and Herzegovina 35; Predrag Nikolić, Ivan Sokolov, Bojan Kurajica, Emir Dizdarević, Nebojša Nikolić, Rade Milovanović	Russia "B" 34½; Alexander Morozevich, Vadim Zvjaginsev, Mikhail Ulibin, Sergei Rublevsky, Konstantin Sakaev, Vasily Yemelin
1996	32nd Chess Olympiad	Yerevan, Armenia	Russia 38½; Garry Kasparov, Vladimir Kramnik, Alexey Dreev, Peter Svidler, Evgeny Bareev, Sergei Rublevsky	Ukraine 35; Vasyl Ivanchuk, Vladimir Malaniuk, Oleg Romanishin, Igor Novikov, Alexander Onischuk, Stanislav Savchenko	United States 34; Boris Gulko, Alex Yermolinsky, Nick de Firmian, Gregory Kaidanov, Joel Benjamin, Larry Christiansen
1998	33rd Chess Olympiad	Elista, Russia	Russia 35½; Peter Svidler, Sergei Rublevsky, Evgeny Bareev, Alexander Morozevich, Vadim Zvjaginsev, Konstantin Sakaev	United States 34½; Alex Yermolinsky, Alexander Shabalov, Yasser Seirawan, Boris Gulko, Nick de Firmian, Gregory Kaidanov	Ukraine 32½; Vasyl Ivanchuk, Alexander Onischuk, Oleg Romanishin, Vladimir Malaniuk, Stanislav Savchenko, Ruslan Ponomariov
2000	34th Chess Olympiad	Istanbul, Turkey	Russia 38; Alexander Khalifman, Alexander Morozevich, Peter Svidler, Sergei Rublevsky, Konstantin Sakaev, Alexander Grischuk	Germany 37; Artur Yusupov, Robert Hübner, Rustem Dautov, Christopher Lutz, Klaus Bischoff, Thomas Luther	Ukraine 35½; Vasyl Ivanchuk, Ruslan Ponomariov, Vladimir Baklan, Vereslav Eingorn, Oleg Romanishin, Vadim Malakhatko
2002	35th Chess Olympiad	Bled, Slovenia	Russia 38½; Garry Kasparov, Alexander Grischuk, Alexander Khalifman, Alexander Morozevich, Peter Svidler, Sergei Rublevsky	Hungary 37½; Péter Lékó, Judit Polgár, Zoltán Almási, Zoltán Gyimesi, Róbert Ruck, Péter Ács	Armenia 35; Vladimir Akopian, Smbat Lputian, Karen Asrian, Gabriel Sargissian, Artashes Minasian, Ashot Anastasian
2004	36th Chess Olympiad	Calvià, Spain	Ukraine 39½; Vasyl Ivanchuk, Ruslan Ponomariov, Andrei Volokitin, Alexander Moiseenko, Pavel Eljanov, Sergey Karjakin	Russia 36½; Alexander Morozevich, Peter Svidler, Alexander Grischuk, Alexey Dreev, Alexander Khalifman, Vadim Zvjaginsev	Armenia 36½; Vladimir Akopian, Levon Aronian, Rafael Vaganian, Smbat Lputian, Gabriel Sargissian, Artashes Minasian
2006	37th Chess Olympiad	Turin, Italy	Armenia 36; Levon Aronian, Vladimir Akopian, Karen Asrian, Smbat Lputian, Gabriel Sargissian, Artashes Minasian	China 34; Bu Xiangzhi, Zhang Zhong, Zhang Pengxiang, Wang Yue, Ni Hua, Zhao Jun	United States 33; Gata Kamsky, Alexander Onischuk, Hikaru Nakamura, Ildar Ibragimov, Gregory Kaidanov, Varuzhan Akobian
2008	38th Chess Olympiad	Dresden, Germany	Armenia 19; Levon Aronian, Vladimir Akopian, Gabriel Sargissian, Tigran L. Petrosian, Artashes Minasian	Israel 18; Boris Gelfand, Michael Roiz, Boris Avrukh, Evgeny Postny, Maxim Rodshtein	United States 17; Gata Kamsky, Hikaru Nakamura, Alexander Onischuk, Yury Shulman, Varuzhan Akobian
2010	39th Chess Olympiad	Khanty-Mansiysk, Russia	Ukraine 19; Vasyl Ivanchuk, Ruslan Ponomariov, Pavel Eljanov, Zahar Efimenko, Alexander Moiseenko	Russia 18; Vladimir Kramnik, Alexander Grischuk, Peter Svidler, Sergey Karjakin, Vladimir Malakhov	Israel 17; Boris Gelfand, Emil Sutovsky, Ilya Smirin, Maxim Rodshtein, Victor Mikhalevski
2012	40th Chess Olympiad	Istanbul, Turkey	Armenia 19; Levon Aronian, Sergei Movsesian, Vladimir Akopian, Gabriel Sargissian, Tigran L. Petrosian	Russia 19; Vladimir Kramnik, Alexander Grischuk, Sergey Karjakin, Evgeny Tomashevsky, Dmitry Jakovenko	Ukraine 18; Vasyl Ivanchuk, Ruslan Ponomariov, Andrei Volokitin, Pavel Eljanov, Alexander Moiseenko
2014	41st Chess Olympiad	Tromsø, Norway	China 19; Wang Yue, Ding Liren, Yu Yangyi, Ni Hua, Wei Yi	Hungary 17; Péter Lékó, Csaba Balogh, Zoltán Almási, Richárd Rapport, Judit Polgár	India 17; Parimarjan Negi, Panayappan Sethuraman, Krishnan Sasikiran, Adhiban Baskaran, Musunuri Rohit Lalit Babu
2016	42nd Chess Olympiad	Baku, Azerbaijan	United States 20; Fabiano Caruana, Hikaru Nakamura, Wesley So, Sam Shankland, Ray Robson	Ukraine 20; Pavel Eljanov, Ruslan Ponomariov, Yuriy Kryvoruchko, Anton Korobov, Andrei Volokitin	Russia 18; Sergey Karjakin, Vladimir Kramnik, Evgeny Tomashevsky, Ian Nepomniachtchi, Alexander Grischuk
2018	43rd Chess Olympiad	Batumi, Georgia	China 18; Ding Liren, Yu Yangyi, Wei Yi, Bu Xiangzhi, Li Chao	United States 18; Fabiano Caruana, Wesley So, Hikaru Nakamura, Sam Shankland, Ray Robson	Russia 18; Sergey Karjakin, Ian Nepomniachtchi, Dmitry Jakovenko, Vladimir Kramnik, Nikita Vitiugov
2020	1st Online Chess Olympiad ^{†}	(Virtual)	India ^{‡} Vidit Gujrathi, Pentala Harikrishna, Koneru Humpy, Harika Dronavalli, Rameshbabu Praggnanandhaa, Divya Deshmukh, Viswanathan Anand, Nihal Sarin, Vantika Agrawal, Aravindh Chithambaram, Bhakti Kulkarni, Rameshbabu Vaishali; Russia; Ian Nepomniachtchi, Vladislav Artemiev, Kateryna Lagno, Alexandra Kosteniuk, Alexey Sarana, Polina Shuvalova, Daniil Dubov, Aleksandra Goryachkina, Andrey Esipenko, Alexander Grischuk, Valentina Gunina, Margarita Potapova	-	Poland; Jan-Krzysztof Duda, Radosław Wojtaszek, Monika Soćko, Karina Cyfka, Igor Janik, Alicja Śliwicka, Grzegorz Gajewski, Szymon Gumularz, Mateusz Bartel, Iweta Rajlich, Jolanta Zawadzka; United States; Wesley So, Sam Shankland, Anna Zatonskih, Tatev Abrahamyan, Jeffery Xiong, Annie Wang, Carissa Yip, Ray Robson
2021	2nd Online Chess Olympiad ^{†}	China (Virtual)	Russia; Daniil Dubov, Vladislav Artemiev, Aleksandra Goryachkina, Alexandra Kosteniuk, Andrey Esipenko, Polina Shuvalova, Kateryna Lagno, Leya Garifullina, Valentina Gunina, Alexander Grischuk, Vladimir Fedoseev, Volodar Murzin	United States; Jeffery Xiong, Ray Robson, Irina Krush, Nazí Paikidze, Awonder Liang, Thalia Cervantes Landeiro, Dariusz Świercz, Anna Zatonskih	China; Ding Liren, Yu Yangyi, Hou Yifan, Ju Wenjun, Wang Shixu, Ning Kaiyu, Xu Zhihang, Wei Yi, Lei Tingjie, Bu Xiangzhi, Zhu Jiner, Huang Qian; India; Viswanathan Anand, Pentala Harikrishna, Koneru Humpy, Harika Dronavalli, Nihal Sarin, Rameshbabu Vaishali, Vidit Gujrathi, Rameshbabu Praggnanandhaa, Adhiban Baskaran, Tania Sachdev, Bhakti Kulkarni, Savitha Shri B
2022	44th Chess Olympiad ^{§}	Chennai, India	Uzbekistan 19; Nodirbek Abdusattorov, Nodirbek Yakubboev, Javokhir Sindarov, Jakhongir Vakhidov, Shamsiddin Vokhidov	Armenia 19; Gabriel Sargissian, Hrant Melkumyan, Samvel Ter-Sahakyan, Manuel Petrosyan, Robert Hovhannisyan	India 2 18; Gukesh Dommaraju, Nihal Sarin, Rameshbabu Praggnanandhaa, Adhiban Baskaran, Raunak Sadhwani
2024	45th Chess Olympiad	Budapest, Hungary	India 21; Gukesh Dommaraju, Rameshbabu Praggnanandhaa, Arjun Erigaisi, Vidit Gujrathi, Pentala Harikrishna	United States 17; Fabiano Caruana, Wesley So, Leinier Domínguez, Levon Aronian, Ray Robson	Uzbekistan 17; Nodirbek Abdusattorov, Nodirbek Yakubboev, Javokhir Sindarov, Shamsiddin Vokhidov, Jakhongir Vakhidov
2026	46th Chess Olympiad	Samarkand, Uzbekistan	Uzbekistan 20; Nodirbek Abdusattorov, Javokhir Sindarov, Nodirbek Yakubboev, Shamsiddin Vokhidov, Mukhiddin Madaminov	India 18; Rameshbabu Praggnanandhaa, Arjun Erigaisi, Nihal Sarin, Gukesh Dommaraju, Vidit Gujrathi	Germany 18; Vincent Keymer, Matthias Blübaum, Frederik Svane, Alexander Donchenko, Rasmus Svane
2028	47th Chess Olympiad	Abu Dhabi, United Arab Emirates			

* In 1976, the Soviet Union, other Communist countries and Arab countries did not compete for political reasons.
^{†} FIDE organized the online olympiads in 2020 and 2021 following the onset of the COVID-19 pandemic.
^{‡} In 2020, Russia and India were subsequently declared joint winners after several Indian team members experienced connectivity issues due to a Cloudflare outage.
^{§} The 2022 event was originally planned to be held in Minsk, Belarus, but it was relocated to Moscow, which originally was host of the 2020 Olympiad, which was canceled due to the COVID-19 pandemic. However, due to the Russian invasion of Ukraine, FIDE made a statement in February 2022 that the tournament will not take place in Russia and would instead take place in Chennai, India.

=== Gaprindashvili Cup ===
This trophy was created by FIDE in 1997 and named after Nona Gaprindashvili, the former women's World Champion (1962–1978). The trophy is awarded to the team that has the best overall performance across the open and women's divisions.

Russia won this trophy six times, China and India three times each, and Ukraine – two times.

Year	First	Second	Third
1998	Russia	China	Georgia
2000	Russia	Ukraine	Georgia
2002	Russia	China	Hungary
2004	Russia	United States	Armenia
2006	China	Ukraine	Armenia
2008	Ukraine	Armenia	United States
2010	Russia	China	Ukraine
2012	Russia	China	Ukraine
2014	China	Russia	Ukraine
2016	Ukraine	United States	China
2018	China	Russia	Ukraine
2022	India	United States	India 2
2024	India	United States	Armenia
2026	India	United States	China

== Medal tables ==
=== Open event ===
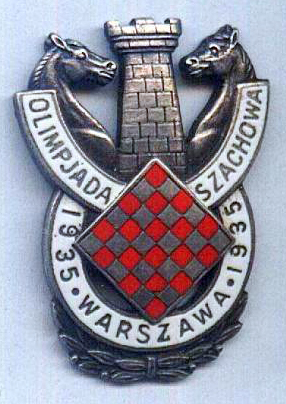
Symbol of the 6th Chess Olympiad in Warsaw 1935 by Jerzy Steifer

The table contains the Open teams ranked by the medals won at the Chess Olympiad (not including the online or unofficial events), ranked by the number of first-place medals, ties broken by second-place medals, etc.

Rank	Nation	Gold	Silver	Bronze	Total
1	Soviet Union	18	1	0	19
2	United States	6	7	8	21
3	Russia	6	3	3	12
4	Hungary	3	7	2	12
5	Armenia	3	1	3	7
6	Ukraine	2	2	3	7
7	Uzbekistan	2	1	1	4
8	China	2	1	0	3
9	Yugoslavia	1	6	6	13
10	Poland	1	2	3	6
11	Germany	1	1	2	4
11	India	1	1	2	4
13	England	0	3	3	6
14	Argentina	0	3	2	5
15	Czechoslovakia	0	2	1	3
16	Israel	0	1	1	2
16	Netherlands	0	1	1	2
16	Sweden	0	1	1	2
19	Bosnia and Herzegovina	0	1	0	1
19	Denmark	0	1	0	1
21	West Germany	0	0	2	2
22	Bulgaria	0	0	1	1
22	Estonia	0	0	1	1
Totals (23 entries)		46	46	46	138

=== Women's event ===
The table contains the women's teams ranked by the medals won at the Chess Olympiad, not including the unofficial events, ranked by the number of first place medals, ties broken by second-place medals, etc.

Rank	Nation	Gold	Silver	Bronze	Total
1	Soviet Union	11	2	0	13
2	China	7	4	4	15
3	Georgia	4	2	3	9
4	Russia	3	3	3	9
5	Hungary	2	5	2	9
6	Ukraine	2	3	3	8
7	India	1	0	2	3
8	Israel	1	0	0	1
9	Romania	0	5	2	7
10	Kazakhstan	0	2	0	2
11	Poland	0	1	2	3
11	United States	0	1	2	3
13	Bulgaria	0	1	1	2
13	Yugoslavia	0	1	1	2
15	England	0	1	0	1
16	East Germany	0	0	3	3
17	Czechoslovakia	0	0	1	1
17	Spain	0	0	1	1
17	West Germany	0	0	1	1
Totals (19 entries)		31	31	31	93

=== Open and Women's events ===
The table contains teams ranked by total number of medals won at the Chess Olympiad (not including the online or unofficial events) in the Open event (since 1927) and Women's event (since 1957), ranked by the number of first-place medals, ties broken by second-place medals, etc.

Rank	Nation	Gold	Silver	Bronze	Total
1	Soviet Union	29	3	0	32
2	Russia	9	6	6	21
3	China	9	5	4	18
4	United States	6	8	10	24
5	Hungary	5	12	4	21
6	Ukraine	4	5	6	15
7	Georgia	4	2	3	9
8	Armenia	3	1	3	7
9	India	2	1	4	7
10	Uzbekistan	2	1	1	4
11	Yugoslavia	1	7	7	15
12	Poland	1	3	5	9
13	Germany	1	1	2	4
14	Israel	1	1	1	3
15	Romania	0	5	2	7
16	England	0	4	3	7
17	Argentina	0	3	2	5
18	Czechoslovakia	0	2	2	4
19	Kazakhstan	0	2	0	2
20	Bulgaria	0	1	2	3
21	Netherlands	0	1	1	2
21	Sweden	0	1	1	2
23	Bosnia and Herzegovina	0	1	0	1
23	Denmark	0	1	0	1
25	East Germany	0	0	3	3
25	West Germany	0	0	3	3
27	Estonia	0	0	1	1
27	Spain	0	0	1	1
Totals (28 entries)		77	77	77	231

== Most successful players in the open section ==
Boldface denotes active chess players and highest medal count among all players (including these who not included in these tables) per type.

=== Multiple team champions ===
Rank	Player	Country	From	To	Gold	Silver	Bronze	Total
1	Tigran Petrosian	Soviet Union	1958	1978	**9**	1	–	10
2	Vasily Smyslov	Soviet Union	1952	1972	**9**	–	–	9
3	Garry Kasparov	Soviet Union; Russia	1980	2002	8	–	–	8
3	Mikhail Tal	Soviet Union	1958	1982	8	–	–	8
5	Paul Keres	Estonia; Soviet Union	1939	1964	7	–	1	8
6	Efim Geller	Soviet Union	1952	1980	7	–	–	7
7	Lev Polugaevsky	Soviet Union	1966	1984	6	1	–	7
7	Boris Spassky	Soviet Union	1962	1978	6	1	–	7
9	Mikhail Botvinnik	Soviet Union	1954	1964	6	–	–	6
9	Anatoly Karpov	Soviet Union	1972	1988	6	–	–	6
9	Viktor Korchnoi	Soviet Union	1960	1974	6	–	–	6

=== Multiple team medalists ===
The table shows players who have won at least 7 team medals in total at the Chess Olympiads.

Rank	Player	Country	From	To	Gold	Silver	Bronze	Total
1	Svetozar Gligorić	Yugoslavia	1950	1974	1	**6**	**5**	**12**
2	Tigran Petrosian	Soviet Union	1958	1978	**9**	1	–	10
3	Borislav Ivkov	Yugoslavia	1956	1980	–	**6**	4	10
4	Vasily Smyslov	Soviet Union	1952	1972	**9**	–	–	9
5	Aleksandar Matanović	Yugoslavia	1954	1972	–	5	4	9
6	Garry Kasparov	Soviet Union; Russia	1980	2002	8	–	–	8
6	Mikhail Tal	Soviet Union	1958	1982	8	–	–	8
8	Paul Keres	Estonia; Soviet Union	1939	1964	7	–	1	8
9	**Vassily (Vasyl) Ivanchuk**	Soviet Union; Ukraine	1988	2012	4	1	3	8
10	Efim Geller	Soviet Union	1952	1980	7	–	–	7
11	Lev Polugaevsky	Soviet Union	1966	1984	6	1	–	7
11	Boris Spassky	Soviet Union	1962	1978	6	1	–	7
13	**Peter Svidler**	Russia	1994	2010	5	2	–	7
14	Vladimir Kramnik	Russia	1992	2018	3	2	2	7
15	Mieczysław (Miguel) Najdorf	Poland; Argentina	1935	1962	–	4	3	7

=== Best individual results in the open section ===
The best individual results in order of overall percentage are:

Rank	Player	Country	Ol.	Gms.	+	=	–	%	Individual medals	Number of ind. medals	Team medals	Number of team medals
1	Mikhail Tal	Soviet Union	8	101	65	34	2	81.2	5 – 2 – 0	7	8 – 0 – 0	8
2	Anatoly Karpov	Soviet Union	6	68	43	23	2	80.1	3 – 0 – 0	3	6 – 0 – 0	6
3	Tigran Petrosian	Soviet Union	10	129	78	50	1	79.8	6 – 0 – 0	6	9 – 1 – 0	10
4	Isaac Kashdan	United States	5	79	52	22	5	79.7	2 – 1 – 2	5	3 – 1 – 0	4
5	Vasily Smyslov	Soviet Union	9	113	69	42	2	79.6	4 – 2 – 2	8	9 – 0 – 0	9
6	David Bronstein	Soviet Union	4	49	30	18	1	79.6	3 – 1 – 0	4	4 – 0 – 0	4
7	Garry Kasparov	Soviet Union (4); Russia (4)	8	82	50	29	3	78.7	3 – 1 – 2	6	8 – 0 – 0	8
8	Alexander Alekhine	France	5	72	43	27	2	78.5	2 – 2 – 0	4	0 – 0 – 0	0
9	Milan Matulović	Yugoslavia	5	78	46	28	4	76.9	1 – 2 – 0	3	0 – 2 – 2	4
10	Paul Keres	Estonia (3); Soviet Union (7)	10	141	85	44	12	75.9	5 – 1 – 1	7	7 – 0 – 1	8
11	Efim Geller	Soviet Union	7	76	46	23	7	75.7	3 – 3 – 0	6	7 – 0 – 0	7
12=	Israel Horowitz	United States	4	51	29	19	3	75.5	2 – 0 – 0	2	3 – 0 – 0	3
12=	James Tarjan	United States	5	51	32	13	6	75.5	2 – 0 – 1	3	1 – 0 – 3	4
14	Bobby Fischer	United States	4	65	40	18	7	75.4	0 – 2 – 1	3	0 – 2 – 0	2
15	Ian Nepomniachtchi	Russia	4	38	20	17	1	75.0	0 – 2 – 2	4	0 – 0 – 2	2
16	Mikhail Botvinnik	Soviet Union	6	73	39	31	3	74.7	2 – 1 – 2	5	6 – 0 – 0	6
17	Amon Simutowe	Zambia	4	37	23	9	5	74.3	0 – 1 – 0	1	0 – 0 – 0	0
18	Sam Shankland	United States	4	35	20	12	3	74.3	1 – 0 – 0	1	1 – 1 – 0	2
19	Yu Yangyi	China	4	42	22	18	2	73.8	1 – 1 – 0	2	2 – 0 – 0	2
20	Salo Flohr	Czechoslovakia	5	82	46	28	8	73.2	2 – 1 – 1	4	0 – 1 – 1	2

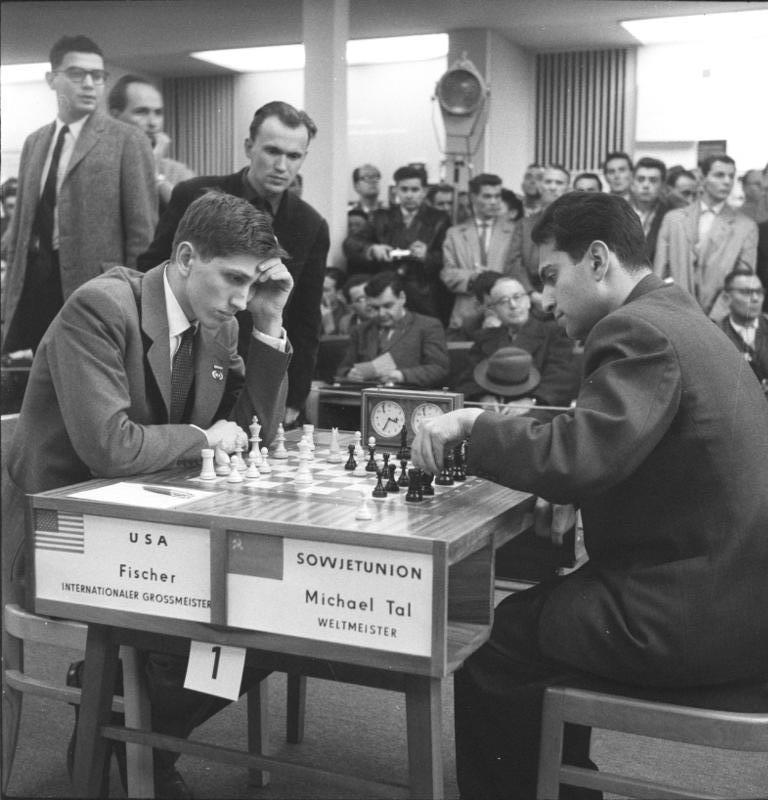
Fischer and Tal at the 1960 Olympiad

Notes

- Only players participating in at least **four Olympiads** are included in this table.
- Medals indicated in the order gold - silver - bronze. The statistics of individual medals includes only medals which are awarding to the top three individual players on each board. The medals for overall performance rating (awarded in 1984–2006) are not included into this statistics, but are listed separately below the table.
- Anatoly Karpov won another individual silver medal for overall performance rating. In total he won 3 gold and 1 silver individual medals.
- Garry Kasparov played his first four Olympiads for the Soviet Union, the rest for Russia. He won another four individual gold medals and one individual silver medal for overall performance rating. In total he won 7 gold, 2 silver and 2 bronze individual medals.
- Paul Keres played his first three Olympiads for Estonia, the rest for the Soviet Union.

=== Medals in both open and women's ===
Judit Polgár from Hungary is the only player to have won Chess Olympiad medals in both competitions – two gold medals in the women's event (1988, 1990) and two silver medals in the open event (2002, 2014).

== See also ==
- World Amateur Chess Championship
- Correspondence Chess Olympiad
- European Chess Club Cup
- European Team Chess Championship
- Mind Sports Organisation
- USSR and Russia versus the Rest of the World
- Women's Chess Olympiad
- Women's World Chess Championship
- World Chess Championship
- World Mind Sports Games
- World Team Chess Championship
