= Vladimir Vuković =

Croatian Jewish chess writer, player and arbiter (1898–1975)

Personal information
- Born: 26 August 1898 Zagreb, Austro-Hungarian Monarchy, (now Croatia)
- Died: 18 November 1975 (aged 77) Zagreb, SFR Yugoslavia

Chess career
- Country: Croatia
- Title: International Master (1951); International Arbiter (1952)

Vladimir Vuković (26 August 1898, Zagreb – 18 November 1975, Zagreb) was a Croatian Jewish chess writer, theoretician, player, arbiter, and journalist.

== Chess career ==
Included in Vuković's tournament record achievements:

- 3rd at Celje 1921, behind Stefan Erdélyi and Imre König
- =4–7th at Vienna 1921 tied with Ernst Grünfeld, Savielly Tartakower, and Árpád Vajda; won by Friedrich Sämisch
- 1st at Vienna 1921
- =10–11th at Vienna 1922; won by Akiba Rubinstein
- =4–5th at Györ 1924 (Hungarian Chess Championship); won by Géza Nagy
- =4–5th at Debrecen 1925; won by Hans Kmoch
- 7th at Kecskemét 1927 (elim., group B); won by Lajos Steiner
- =6–7th at Kecskemét 1927 (final B); won by Savielly Tartakower
- 3rd at Ramsgate 1929, behind Adolf Seitz and Árpád Vajda

He played for Yugoslavia on second board in the 1st Chess Olympiad at London 1927, posting a record of +7−6=2.

He was awarded the International Master (IM) title in 1951 and International Arbiter (IA) in 1952.

He also served as the vice-president of the Croatian Chess Federation.

=== Writer ===
Vuković edited the monthly chess magazine Šahovski Glasnik (Chess Journal), the official periodical of the Yugoslavian chess federation. He is the author of The Art of Attack in Chess (Oxford-London 1963), which is widely regarded as a classic of chess literature. Other books he wrote include Razvoj šahovskih ideja [The development of chess ideas] (Zagreb 1928) and The Chess Sacrifice (London-New York 1968).

== Legacy ==
Vuković has a checkmate pattern named after him: Vuković's Mate. It involves checkmating the enemy king with a rook in front of it while a knight blocks off the adjacent escape squares.

== Death ==
Vuković died on November 18, 1975, in Zagreb and was buried at the Mirogoj Cemetery.
