= Kornél Havasi =

Hungarian chess player

Kornél Havasi (10 January 1892 – 15 January 1945) was a Jewish-Hungarian chess master.

He won at Budapest 1911; took 9th at Temesvár 1912 (HUN-ch, Gyula Breyer won); tied for 4-5th at Budapest 1917 (Breyer won); took 4th at Budapest 1918 (Zoltán von Balla and Richard Réti won); tied for 9-11th at Kaschau (Košice) 1918 (Réti won); tied for 1st-2nd with Szávay at Budapest 1920; took 6th at Gyula 1921 (Borislav Kostić won).

Havasi was Hungarian Champion, winning at Budapest 1922. He took 3rd at Budapest 1923; tied for 6-7th at Gyula 1923 (Gruber won); took 10th at Györ 1924 (HUN-ch, Géza Nagy won); tied for 6-10th at Debrecen 1925 (Maróczy Jubiläumturnier, Hans Kmoch won); tied for 3rd-4th at Budapest 1926 (Endre Steiner won); tied for 12-14th at Budapest 1926 (1st FIDE Tournament, Ernst Grünfeld and Mario Monticelli won); tied for 2nd-4th at Budapest 1928 (HUN-ch, Árpád Vajda won); tied for 7-8th at Budapest 1928 (José Raúl Capablanca won), and won at Mezökövesd 1929 (Quadrangular).

He tied for 4-5th at Budapest 1931 (HUN-ch, Lajos Steiner won); took 4th at Sopron 1934 (Rudolf Spielmann won); tied for 5-6th at Budapest 1934 (Maróczy Jubilee, Erich Eliskases won); tied for 12-14th at Budapest (Ujpest) 1934 (Andor Lilienthal won); tied for 5-6th at Tatatovaros 1935 (László Szabó won); tied for 5-7th at Budapest 1936 (HUN-ch, L. Steiner and Mieczysław Najdorf won); tied for 3rd-4th at Milan 1938 (Eliskases and Monticelli won), and tied for 4-6th at Budapest 1939 (Dori Memorial, Balla and Szabó won).

Havasi played for Hungary in Chess Olympiads:

- In 1924, at 1st unofficial Chess Olympiad in Paris (+6 –5 =0)
- In 1927, at fourth board in 1st Chess Olympiad in London (+4 –1 =3)
- In 1928, at fourth board in 2nd Chess Olympiad in The Hague (+6 –1 =9)
- In 1930, at fourth board in 3rd Chess Olympiad in Hamburg (+10 –0 =4)
- In 1931, at fourth board in 4th Chess Olympiad in Prague (+7 –4 =3)
- In 1933, at fourth board in 5th Chess Olympiad in Folkestone (+5 –1 =6)
- In 1935, at third board 6th Chess Olympiad in Warsaw (+5 –0 =6)
- In 1936, at fourth board in 3rd unofficial Chess Olympiad in Munich (+4 –0 =12)
- In 1937, at fourth board in 7th Chess Olympiad in Stockholm (+6 –4 =5).

He won six team medals (three gold in 1927, 1928, 1936, and three silver in 1924, 1930, 1937) and one individual silver medal in 1935.

He published a book A soproni jubiláris sakkverseny, 1934 (Budapest 1935).

During The Holocaust, Kornél Havasi was killed by the Nazis at 1945 in Bruck an der Leitha (Austria). He had to work there as a forced labourer until his death.
