= FIDE Online Chess Olympiad 2020 =

Chess tournament

2020 FIDE Online Chess Olympiad
- Fide Online Chess Olympiad
- Dates run: 24 July – 30 August
- Teams: 163
- Nations: 162
- Venue: Online (hosted by Chess.com)
- Location: Online

Team medalists
- Open: (gold) India and Russia

The FIDE Online Chess Olympiad 2020 was an online chess tournament organised by the Fédération Internationale des Échecs (FIDE) and hosted by Chess.com. It was held between 24 July and 30 August. The event was organised after the 44th Chess Olympiad was postponed due to the COVID-19 pandemic. The final match between Russia and India was called off after several Indian team members experienced connectivity issues due to a global outage of Cloudflare servers; Russia and India were subsequently declared joint winners. The second edition of the tournament was held in 2021.

== Participating teams ==
Participating teams in the 2020 Online Chess Olympiad
- Algeria
- Angola
- Antigua and Barbuda
- Argentina
- Armenia
- Aruba
- Australia
- Austria
- Azerbaijan
- Bahamas
- Bahrain
- Bangladesh
- Barbados
- Belarus
- Belgium
- Bermuda
- Bhutan
- Bolivia
- Bosnia and Herzegovina
- Botswana
- Brazil
- Brunei
- Burundi
- Cameroon
- Canada
- Cape Verde
- Central African Republic
- Chile
- China
- Chinese Taipei
- Colombia
- Costa Rica
- Croatia
- Cuba
- Cyprus
- Denmark
- Dominican Republic
- Ecuador
- Egypt
- El Salvador
- England
- Estonia
- Ethiopia
- Fiji
- France
- Gabon
- Gambia
- Georgia
- Germany
- Ghana
- Greece
- Guam
- Guatemala
- Guatemala
- Guyana
- Haiti
- Honduras
- Hong Kong
- Hungary
- Iceland
- India
- Indonesia
- IPCA
- Iran
- Iraq
- Ireland
- Israel
- Italy
- Jamaica
- Japan
- Jordan
- Kazakhstan
- Kenya
- Kosovo
- Kuwait
- Kyrgyzstan
- Laos
- Latvia
- Lebanon
- Lesotho
- Liberia
- Libya
- Macau
- Madagascar
- Malawi
- Malaysia
- Maldives
- Mali
- Malta
- North Macedonia
- Mauritania
- Mauritius
- Mexico
- Moldova
- Monaco
- Mongolia
- Montenegro
- Morocco
- Mozambique
- Myanmar
- Namibia
- Nepal
- Netherlands
- (Curaçao) Netherlands Antilles
- New Zealand
- Nicaragua
- Nigeria
- Norway
- Oman
- Pakistan
- Palau
- Palestine
- Panama
- Paraguay
- Peru
- Philippines
- Poland
- Portugal
- Puerto Rico
- Qatar
- Romania
- Russia
- Rwanda
- Saint Lucia
- San Marino
- São Tomé and Príncipe
- Scotland
- Senegal
- Serbia
- Seychelles
- Sierra Leone
- Singapore
- Slovakia
- Slovenia
- Somalia
- South Africa
- South Korea
- Spain
- Sri Lanka
- Sudan
- Suriname
- Eswatini
- Sweden
- Switzerland
- Syria
- Tajikistan
- Tanzania
- Thailand
- Togo
- Trinidad and Tobago
- Tunisia
- Turkey
- Turkmenistan
- Uganda
- Ukraine
- United Arab Emirates
- United States
- Uruguay
- Uzbekistan
- Venezuela
- Vietnam
- Wales
- Zambia
- Zimbabwe

== Medalists ==
Gold		Bronze	
India; Viswanathan Anand; Vidit Gujrathi; Koneru Humpy; Harika Dronavalli; Nihal Sarin; Divya Deshmukh; Pentala Harikrishna; Aravindh Chithambaram; Bhakti Kulkarni; Vaishali Rameshbabu; Praggnanandhaa Rameshbabu; Vantika Agrawal	Russia; Alexander Grischuk; Ian Nepomniachtchi; Kateryna Lagno; Aleksandra Goryachkina; Andrey Esipenko; Polina Shuvalova; Daniil Dubov; Vladislav Artemiev; Alexandra Kosteniuk; Valentina Gunina; Alexey Sarana; Margarita Potapova	Poland; Jan-Krzysztof Duda; Radoslaw Wojtaszek; Monika Socko; Jolanta Zawadzka; Szymon Gumularz; Alicja Śliwicka; Mateusz Bartel; Grzegorz Gajewski; Karina Cyfka; Iweta Rajlich; Igor Janik; Julia Antolak	United States of America; Wesley So; Samuel Shankland; Carissa Yip; Anna Zatonskih; Jeffery Xiong; Annie Wang; Ray Robson; Tatev Abrahamyan

== Gazprom Brilliancy Prize ==
Gazprom sponsored a brilliancy prize for the event, with the judges being 14 popular streamers and YouTubers: Anna Cramling, Maria Emelianova, Jesse February, Anna-Maja Kazarian, Daniel King, Ayelen Martinez, Carlos Matamoros Franco, Daniel Naroditsky, Antonio Radić, Michael Rahal, IM Eric Rosen, Sagar Shah and Amruta Mokal (joint submission), Fiona Steil-Antoni, and Simon Williams. Nine of the games that were presented to the judges received votes, with the game totaling the most votes being Danyyil Dvirnyy–Alexei Shirov; Shirov, in the Slav Defense, executed a decisive queenside attack involving a queen sacrifice.
