= Vajna =

Vajna is a surname. Notable people with the surname include:

- Andrew G. Vajna (1944–2019), a Hungarian-American film producer
- Gábor Vajna (1891–1946), a Hungarian politician

== See also ==
- Vajda
- Vanna
