= Árpád Vajda =

Hungarian chess player (1896–1967)

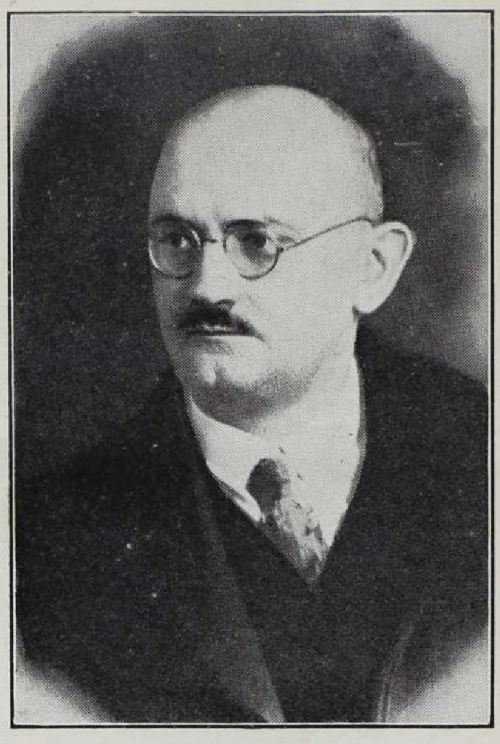

Árpád Vajda (2 May 1896, Rimaszombat (Rimavská Sobota) – 25 October 1967, Budapest) was a Hungarian chess master. He was also a Doctor of Law and State Science, and worked as chief of police in Budapest.

Vajda was Hungarian Champion in 1928.

He tied for 4-7th at Vienna 1921 (Friedrich Sämisch won); tied for 5-7th at Budapest 1922 (6th HUN-ch, Kornél Havasi won); won at London 1922; took 2nd at Portsmouth 1923; tied for 4-5th at Györ 1924 (7th HUN-ch, Géza Nagy won); tied for 11-12th at Debrecen 1925 (Hans Kmoch won); took 5th at Budapest 1926 (Endre Steiner won); took 11th at Budapest 1926 (1st FIDE Masters, Ernst Grünfeld and Mario Monticelli won); tied for 5-7th at Kecskemét 1927 (Alexander Alekhine won); shared 5th at Budapest 1928 (José Raúl Capablanca won); tied for 4-5th at Budapest 1929 (Capablanca won); shared 1st with Adolf Seitz at Ramsgate 1929 (B tournament); tied for 4-7th at Sopron 1934 (Rudolf Spielmann won).

He represented Hungary in Chess Olympiads:

- In 1924 in 1st unofficial Chess Olympiad in Paris (+5 –2 =6) team silver medal and individual 4-6th place (Championship Final, Hermanis Matisons won);
- In 1926 in 2nd unofficial Chess Olympiad in Budapest – team gold medal and individual 11th place (1st FIDE Masters);
- In 1927 at third board in 1st Chess Olympiad in London (+5 –3 =5) team gold medal;
- In 1928 at third board in 2nd Chess Olympiad in The Hague (+6 –1 =9) team gold medal;
- In 1930 at third board in 3rd Chess Olympiad in Hamburg (+7 –3 =4) team silver medal;
- In 1931 at third board in 4th Chess Olympiad in Prague (+4 –4 =7) team 10th place;
- In 1933 at third board in 5th Chess Olympiad in Folkestone (+4 –3 =4) team 5th place;
- In 1936 at seventh board in 3rd unofficial Chess Olympiad in Munich (+5 –0 =10) team gold medal;
- In 1937 at reserve board in 7th Chess Olympiad in Stockholm (+0 –2 =2) team silver medal.

Vajda was awarded the International Master (IM) title in 1950.
