= Antolak =

Antolak is a surname. Notable people with the surname include:

- Julia Antolak (born 2000), Polish chess grandmaster
- Sylvester Antolak (1918–1944), United States Army Sergeant
- Vlastislav Antolák (1942–2023), Czech teacher and politician
