= Boris Kostić =

Yugoslav chess grandmaster (1887–1963)

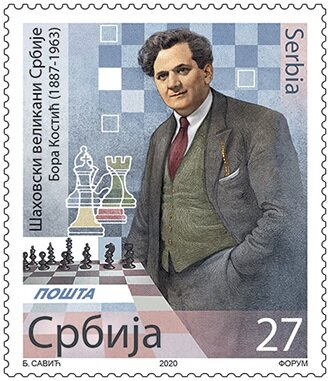

Personal information
- Born: 24 February 1887 Vršac, Austria-Hungary
- Died: 3 November 1963 (aged 76) Belgrade, PR Serbia, Yugoslavia

Chess career
- Country: Austria-Hungary (until 1918); Austria (1918–1927); Yugoslavia (1927–1963)
- Title: Grandmaster (1950)

Borislav "Bora" Kostić (Serbian Cyrillic: Борислав (Бора) Костић; 24 February 1887 – 3 November 1963) was a Serbian and Yugoslav chess grandmaster and a popularizer of the game. He was one of the best players in the world during the early part of the 20th century and in 1950 was among the inaugural recipients of the title International Grandmaster from FIDE.

== Life and chess ==
Boris Kostić
Medal record

Representing (Kingdom of Yugoslavia) Yugoslavia

Men's chess

Olympiad
Silver medal – second place	1926 Budapest	Open team
Gold medal – first place	1936 Munich	Individual board 6

Borislav Kostic was born in Vršac, Kingdom of Hungary, at the time part of Austria-Hungary. His father Dimitrije was a merchant and his mother was Emilija (née: Mandukić). He learned chess around the age of ten and made rapid progress while studying Oriental Trade in Budapest. He also spent time in Vienna, the chess capital of the day, and this enabled him to get the high level practice necessary to take his game to the next level.

In 1910 he moved to Cologne and from there, travelled and toured extensively, mainly in the Americas, playing matches against local champions and simultaneous blindfold chess. At New York in 1916, he once played twenty opponents without sight of a board and won nineteen games and drew one, while engaging in polite conversation with opponents and spectators.

Kostic played more formal matches against Frank Marshall, Jackson Showalter, and Paul Leonhardt, and won them all. Kostic also played tournaments while in the United States, including New York 1916, Chicago 1918 and New York 1918, where he finished second behind Capablanca. At Havana in 1919 however, his winning streak ended with a 5–0 loss to Capablanca. The opponent's skill combined with Kostic's physical exhaustion, illness, and trouble adjusting to the local tropical climate and diet led to Kostic losing the match unexpectedly convincingly. Capablanca wrote that his own career peaked with this match.

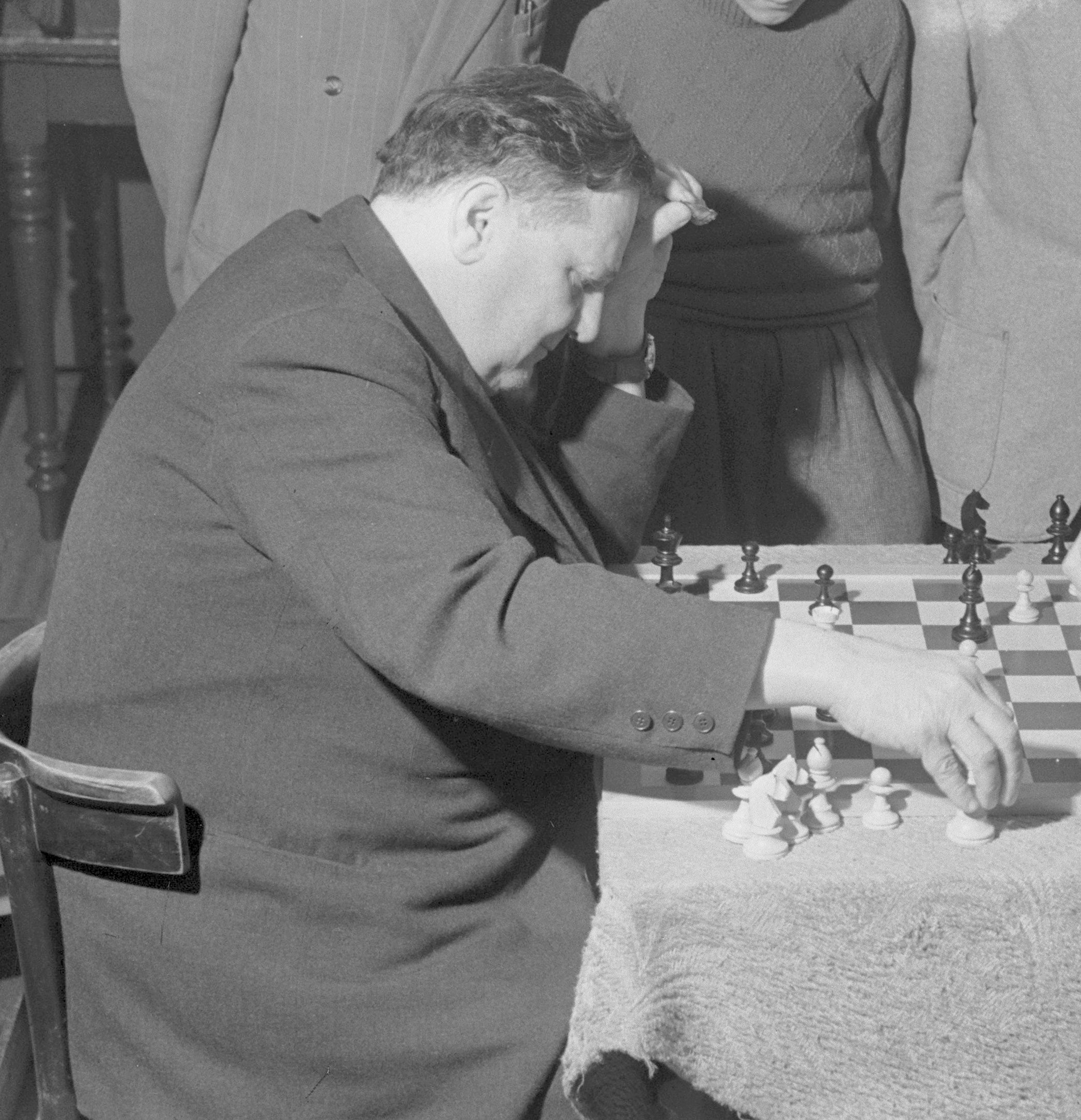
Boris Kostić (Hoogovens, 1952)

On the European circuit, he won at Stockholm 1913, finished second at Hastings 1919 and won at Hastings 1921/1922. At Trencianske Teplice 1928, he won ahead of Steiner, Sämisch and Spielmann. At Bled 1931, he finished in tenth place, but nevertheless outscored fellow chessmasters Maróczy, Colle and Pirc. At Bucharest 1932, he won the title of Romanian champion. At Belgrade 1935, he shared the title of Yugoslav champion with Pirc, and went on to become sole champion in 1938. He won at Ljubljana the same year.

A strong player in his own right, Kostic is mostly famous not for his tournament results but for his chess world tours. From 1923 to 1926, Kostic travelled to Australasia, the Far East, Africa, India, and Siberia - places that were barely represented on the chess map of the time. In one match held in Africa at the equator, Kostic was in the northern hemisphere, and his opponent on the southern.

In the late 1920s, he made another trip to the Americas. He represented Yugoslavia in four Chess Olympiads (London 1927, Prague 1931, Warsaw 1935, and Stockholm 1937), and in two unofficial Chess Olympiads (Budapest 1926 and Munich 1936).

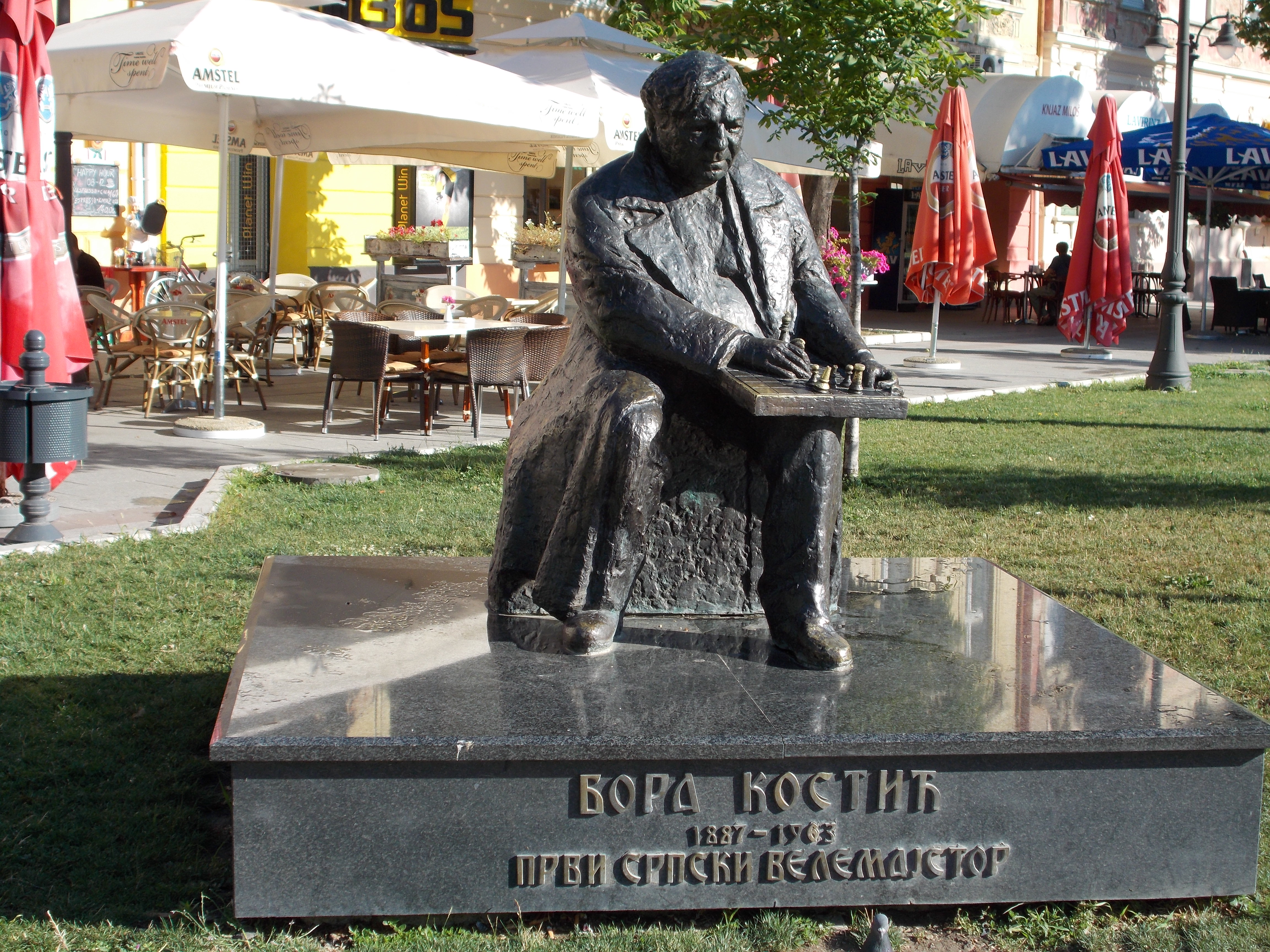
A monument to Bora Kostic in Vršac

During World War II, Kostić was imprisoned in a concentration camp by a Nazi SS commander (Schiller) because he declined to participate in tournaments called "Free Europa" and to glorify the Nazi regime. Afterwards, he played chess only in a more minor capacity. His final appearance was at the Zürich veterans tournament of 1962, which he won. Kostic was awarded the Grandmaster title by FIDE in 1950, on its inaugural list. He was fluent in Russian, English, Hungarian, German, Spanish and Hebrew. He died in Belgrade in 1963, aged 76.

On September 23, 2020, the public company "Pošta Srbije" released a new postage stamps called: "Chess Giants of Serbia". In addition to Kostić, Svetozar Gligorić, Petar Trifunović, Milan Matulović and Milunka Lazarević were also given this honor. On that occasion, short biographies of the players depicted on these stamps were also published. The texts are given in Serbian and English, and their authors are: grandmaster Aleksandar Matanović and sports journalist Miroslav Nešić.

== Rating and ranking ==
During his prime in the 1910s and 1920s, Kostić was one of the ten best players in the world. His highest Historical Chessmetrics Rating was 2706, in May 1921, while his highest ranking was world number 5.

== Lifetime scores against selected players ==
Kostić had the following record against notable players of his time. Players who were world champions at one point in their career are marked in bold.

Player	Wins	Losses	Draws	Federation
Aron Nimzowitsch	1	0	4	Russia/Denmark
Siegbert Tarrasch	0	0	2	Germany
Frank Marshall	2	0	7	United States
Géza Maróczy	2	1	6	Hungary
Efim Bogoljubow	2	1	1	Russia/Germany
Akiba Rubinstein	1	2	1	Russia/Poland
Savielly Tartakower	4	3	7	Poland/France
Milan Vidmar	3	5	3	Yugoslavia
Ernst Grünfeld	1	2	2	Austria
Fred Yates	4	0	1	United Kingdom
**José Raúl Capablanca**	0	5	5	Cuba
**Alexander Alekhine**	0	2	3	Russia/France
**Max Euwe**	2	1	1	Netherlands
Lajos Asztalos	2	0	3	Hungary/Yugoslavia
Lajos Steiner	2	1	1	Hungary/Australia
Friedrich Sämisch	0	2	3	Germany
David Janowski	1	1	2	Poland
Jackson Showalter	4	0	2	United States
Edgar Colle	1	1	4	Belgium
Rudolf Spielmann	1	1	5	Austria
Vasja Pirc	2	5	6	Yugoslavia
Petar Trifunović	0	5	4	Yugoslavia
Kornél Havasi	0	0	3	Hungary

== See also ==
- Italian Game, Blackburne Shilling Gambit
- Svetozar Gligorić
- Dragoljub Velimirović
