= Athletics at the 2014 Summer Youth Olympics – Boys' 400 metre hurdles =

Athletics – Boys' 400 metres hurdles at the II Summer Youth Olympic Games
- Venue: Nanjing Olympic Sports Centre
- Date: August 22–25
- Competitors: 16 from 16 nations

Medalists
1st place, gold medalist(s)		Xu Zhihang	China
2nd place, silver medalist(s)		Mohamed Fares Jlassi	Tunisia
3rd place, bronze medalist(s)		Victor Coroller	France

The boys’ 400 metre hurdles competition at the 2014 Summer Youth Olympics was held on 22–25 August 2014 in Nanjing Olympic Sports Center.

== Schedule ==
Date	Time	Round
22 August 2014	19:15	Heats
25 August 2014	10:58	Final

== Results ==
=== Heats ===
Eight fastest athletes advanced to Final A, the others advanced to Final B according to their times.

Rank	Heat	Lane	Athlete	Result	Notes	Q
1	1	8	Xu Zhihang (CHN)	50.79		FA
2	1	5	Mikael De Jesús (BRA)	51.12	PB	FA
3	2	7	Witthawat Thumcha (THA)	51.80		FA
4	2	2	Victor Coroller (FRA)	51.91		FA
5	2	3	Dominik Hufnagl (AUT)	52.34		FA
6	1	3	Mohamed Fares Jlassi (TUN)	52.57		FA
7	2	6	Juan Francisco Núñez (DOM)	52.72	PB	FA
8	1	9	Akeem Chumney (SKN)	53.00	PB	FA
9	1	2	Geoffrey Kipngetich (KEN)	53.10		FB
10	2	9	Anuradha Vidushanka Randunuge (SRI)	53.31		FB
11	2	8	Javad Shooryabi (IRI)	53.32		FB
12	1	6	Huang Chien-Kang (TPE)	53.33		FB
13	2	4	Yolver Eduardo Cumache (VEN)	55.34		FB
14	1	7	Dangel Cotto (PUR)	53.99		FB
	1	4	Rivaldo Leacock (BAR)	DNF		FB
	2	5	Kyron McMaster (IVB)	DSQ		FB

=== Finals ===
==== Final A ====
Rank	Final Placing	Lane	Athlete	Result	Notes
1st place, gold medalist(s)	1	5	Xu Zhihang (CHN)	50.61	PB
2nd place, silver medalist(s)	2	8	Mohamed Fares Jlassi (TUN)	50.61	PB
3rd place, bronze medalist(s)	3	4	Victor Coroller (FRA)	51.19	PB
4	4	7	Mikael De Jesús (BRA)	51.30	
5	5	6	Witthawat Thumcha (THA)	52.50	
6	6	3	Juan Francisco Núñez (DOM)	52.70	PB
7	7	9	Dominik Hufnagl (AUT)	52.95	
8	8	2	Akeem Chumney (SKN)	53.26	

==== Final B ====
Rank	Final Placing	Lane	Athlete	Result	Notes
1	9	7	Javad Shooryabi (IRI)	52.31	
2	10	9	Dangel Cotto (PUR)	52.50	PB
3	11	4	Geoffrey Kipngetich (KEN)	52.87	
4	12	5	Anuradha Vidushanka Randunuge (SRI)	53.30	
5	13	6	Huang Chien-Kang (TPE)	53.62	
6	14	8	Yolver Eduardo Cumache (VEN)	54.15	PB
		2	Kyron Mcmaster (IVB)	DSQ	
		3	Rivaldo Leacock (BAR)	DNS	
