= FIDE Online Chess Olympiad 2021 =

Chess tournament

- Country: China (virtual host)
- Nations: 152
- Teams: 153
- Dates: 20 August – 15 September

The FIDE Online Chess Olympiad 2021 was the second FIDE Online Chess Olympiad, an annual online chess tournament organised by the Fédération Internationale des Échecs (FIDE) since 2020, following the onset of the COVID-19 pandemic. It was virtually hosted by China and took place from 20 August to 15 September 2021 on Chess.com's server. Russia finished first and the United States second, while China and India tied for the third place.

== Background ==
Teams participating in the FIDE Online Chess Olympiad 2021 Legend: Top Division Second Division Third Division Fourth Division Not participated

In July 2021, the Fédération Internationale des Échecs (FIDE) announced that the second edition of the Online Chess Olympiad will be inaugurated on 13 August and last until 15 September. National federations intending to take part in the Olympiad confirmed their participation by 31 July and were to choose their top players and juniors to send for the event. The format of the tournament is the same as the first edition, the FIDE Online Chess Olympiad 2020, which was created after the 44th Chess Olympiad was postponed owing to the COVID-19 pandemic. The inaugural date was later revised to 20 August.

China, the virtual hosts of the event, sent two teams to the tournament, one from the mainland and the other from Shenzhen, both playing under the Chinese flag. The authorities of Shenzhen, including the Shenzhen Longgang District Culture and Sports Bureau, the Shenzhen MSU-BIT University, Shenzhen Chess Academy and the Shenzhen Pengcheng Chess Club, sponsored the tournament. The Russian e-commerce company Simaland was also a partner. The tournament is broadcast live on FIDE's YouTube channel and on Chess.com.

== Participating teams ==
153 teams participated, divided into 4 divisions. The top two teams in each division will advance to the quarter-finals while the other teams play against each other to qualify. The Afghanistan team withdrew from the event following the Taliban takeover of the country.

Participating teams in the FIDE Online Chess Olympiad 2021

=== Top Division ===
- Argentina
- Armenia
- Australia
- Azerbaijan
- Belarus
- Brazil
- Canada
- China
- Colombia
- Cuba
- Czech Republic
- Egypt
- England
- France
- Georgia
- Germany
- Greece
- Hungary
- India
- Indonesia
- Iran
- Israel
- Italy
- Kazakhstan
- Latvia
- Moldova
- Mongolia
- Netherlands
- Paraguay
- Peru
- Poland
- Romania
- Russia
- Shenzhen (China)
- Slovenia
- Spain
- Sweden
- Turkey
- Ukraine
- United States

=== Division 2 ===
- Albania
- Algeria
- Angola
- Austria
- Bangladesh
- Bolivia
- Chile
- Chinese Taipei
- Costa Rica
- Ecuador
- El Salvador
- Estonia
- Guatemala
- Iraq
- Ireland
- Jamaica
- Kyrgyzstan
- Lebanon
- Malaysia
- Mexico
- Montenegro
- Morocco
- Norway
- Philippines
- Portugal
- Scotland
- Singapore
- South Africa
- Sri Lanka
- Switzerland
- Uruguay
- Uzbekistan
- Venezuela
- Wales
- Zimbabwe

=== Division 3 ===
- Aruba
- Barbados
- Botswana
- Cape Verde
- Cyprus
- Dominican Republic
- Ethiopia
- Fiji
- Ghana
- Haiti
- Honduras
- ICCD
- IPCA
- Japan
- Jordan
- Kenya
- Kosovo
- Malawi
- Mozambique
- Namibia
- Nepal
- New Zealand
- Nicaragua
- Nigeria
- Palestine
- Panama
- Puerto Rico
- South Korea
- Suriname
- Syria
- Thailand
- Trinidad and Tobago
- Tunisia
- United Arab Emirates
- Zambia

=== Division 4 ===
- Antigua and Barbuda
- Bahamas
- Bahrain
- Bermuda
- Brunei Darussalam
- Burundi
- Cameroon
- Cayman Islands
- Côte d'Ivoire
- Democratic Republic of the Congo
- Djibouti
- Eritrea
- Eswatini
- Gabon
- Gambia
- Guam
- Guyana
- Hong Kong
- Jersey
- Kuwait
- Laos
- Lesotho
- Libya
- Maldives
- Malta
- Mauritania
- Netherlands Antilles
- Oman
- Pakistan
- Qatar
- Rwanda
- Saint Lucia
- San Marino
- São Tomé and Príncipe
- Saudi Arabia
- Senegal
- Seychelles
- Sierra Leone
- Somalia
- Sudan
- Tanzania
- Togo
- Uganda

== Results ==
=== Division 4 ===
==== Pool A ====
Rank	Team	1	2	3	4	5	6	7	8	9	10	11	12	TB1	TB2
1	Nepal	●	3½	4	4½	3	2½	4	4	5½	4	4	5	19	44
2	Lebanon	2½	●	2	4	3½	3	5	4	5	4	4½	6	17	43 1/2
3	Hong Kong	2	4	●	4	3½	4½	3	2	4½	4	4	4	17	39 1/2
4	Fiji	1½	2	2	●	3½	3½	3	3½	4½	4	6	6	15	39 1/2
5	Oman	3	2½	2½	2½	●	3½	3	3	5½	4	4	5	13	38 1/2
6	Pakistan	3½	3	1½	2½	2½	●	2	4½	4	4	5	5	13	37 1/2
7	Maldives	2	1	3	3	3	4	●	1½	4	4½	5	5½	13	36 1/2
8	Guam	2	2	4	2½	3	1½	4½	●	2	3	5	5	10	34 1/2
9	Brunei	½	1	1½	1½	½	2	2	4	●	5	5	4	8	27
10	Bahrain	2	2	2	2	2	2	1½	3	1	●	4	4	5	25 1/2
11	Seychelles	1	1½	2	0	2	1	1	1	1	2	●	4	2	16 1/2
12	Laos	0	0	2	0	1	1	½	1	2	2	2	●	0	11 1/2

Nepal, Lebanon and Fiji advanced to Division 3.

==== Pool B ====
Rank	Team	1	2	3	4	5	6	7	8	9	10	11	12	TB1	TB2
1	Kenya	●	5½	2½	4½	3½	4½	4½	4	5	4½	5	4	20	47 1/2
2	Palestine	½	●	3½	5½	3½	3	5½	4	3½	6	3½	6	19	44 1/2
3	Namibia	3½	2½	●	½	3½	3½	4	3½	4	5	5	6	18	41
4	Malawi	1½	½	5½	●	4	2½	4	4	5½	5	5	5	16	42 1/2
5	Kuwait	2½	2½	2½	2	●	4	4	3½	5	4	3	4	13	37
6	Lesotho	1½	3	2½	3½	2	●	3	2½	4½	3½	5	4½	12	35 1/2
7	Saudi Arabia	1½	½	2	2	2	3	●	4	3	5	5	4	10	32
8	Uganda	2	2	2½	2	2½	3½	2	●	3	6	3	6	8	34 1/2
9	Qatar	1	2½	2	½	1	1½	3	3	●	3	4	6	7	27 1/2
10	Rwanda	1½	0	1	1	2	2½	1	0	3	●	4	6	5	22
11	Somalia	1	2½	1	1	3	0	1	3	2	2	●	5	4	21 1/2
12	Eritrea	2	0	0	1	2	1½	2	0	0	0	0	●	0	8 1/2

Kenya, Palestine, Namibia and Malawi advanced to Division 3.

==== Pool C ====
Rank	Team	1	2	3	4	5	6	7	8	9	10	11	12	TB1	TB2
1	Angola	●	5	6	6	5½	6	4	6	6	6	4	5	22	59 1/2
2	Cyprus	1	●	4	3½	2	4	3½	4	4	4	6	6	18	42
3	Ethiopia	0	2	●	6	1½	3½	3½	6	3½	6	4	6	16	42
4	Jersey	0	2½	0	●	5	4	3½	3	3½	4	5	6	15	36 1/2
5	Sudan	½	4	4½	1	●	3½	3	2	4	3	5	5	14	35 1/2
6	Tanzania	0	2	2½	2	2½	●	4	4	4	5½	5	5	12	36 1/2
7	Malta	2	2½	2½	2½	3	2	●	4	3	4	5	5	10	35 1/2
8	Eswatini	0	2	0	3	4	2	2	●	3	5	5	6	10	32
9	Libya	0	2	2½	2½	2	2	3	3	●	5	4½	5	8	31 1/2
10	Burundi	0	2	0	2	3	½	2	1	1	●	3½	4	5	19
11	San Marino	2	0	2	1	1	1	1	1	1½	2½	●	3	2	16
12	Djibouti	1	0	0	0	1	1	1	0	1	2	1	●	0	8

Angola, Cyprus and Ethiopia advanced to Division 3.

==== Pool D ====
Rank	Team	1	2	3	4	5	6	7	8	9	10	11	12	TB1	TB2
1	Suriname	●	4½	5	6	6	4½	6	5	5	6	5	6	22	59
2	Aruba	1½	●	6	4½	5	5½	3½	4	5	6	5	6	20	52
3	Ghana	1	0	●	3	6	4	6	4½	4	4½	4½	5	17	42 1/2
4	Cape Verde	0	1½	3	●	2½	3	5	4½	5	6	5½	6	14	42
5	São Tomé and Príncipe	0	1	0	3½	●	3	5	4	3	4	1	3	14	27 1/2
6	Cameroon	1½	½	2	3	3	●	2	3	4	5	6	6	12	36
7	Gabon	0	2½	0	1	1	4	●	3	4	4	5	5	11	29 1/2
8	Senegal	1	2	1½	1½	2	2	3	●	3	6	4	6	10	32
9	Gambia	1	1	2	1	3	2	2	3	●	4	3	4	7	26
10	Ivory Coast	0	0	1½	0	0	0	0	0	1	●	5	5	4	12 1/2
11	Sierra Leone	1	1	1½	½	0	0	1	2	3	0	●	4	3	14
12	Democratic Republic of the Congo	0	0	1	0	0	0	0	0	0	0	1	●	0	2

Suriname, Aruba, Ghana and Cape Verde advanced to Division 3.

=== Division 3 ===
==== Pool A ====
Rank	Team	1	2	3	4	5	6	7	8	9	10	TB1	TB2
1	Malaysia	●	4½	3½	2½	3½	3½	4	4	5	5½	16	36
2	Chinese Taipei	1½	●	3½	3	3½	4½	3½	3	3½	4½	14	30 1/2
3	Sri Lanka	2½	2½	●	4	3	4	5½	4	5	6	13	36 1/2
4	IPCA	3½	3	2	●	1	4	4	4	5	5	13	31 1/2
5	South Korea	2½	2½	3	5	●	2½	4	4½	4	5	11	33
6	Japan	2½	1½	2	2	3½	●	2½	4	5½	5½	8	29
7	Thailand	2	2½	½	2	2	3½	●	4½	5	4½	8	26 1/2
8	Nepal (A)	2	3	2	2	1½	2	1½	●	3½	3	4	20 1/2
9	New Zealand	1	2½	1	1	2	½	1	2½	●	4½	2	16
10	Fiji (A)	½	1½	0	1	1	½	1½	3	1½	●	1	10 1/2

Malaysia, Chinese Taipei and Sri Lanka advanced to Division 2.

==== Pool B ====
Rank	Team	1	2	3	4	5	6	7	8	9	10	TB1	TB2
1	Ireland	●	4½	4½	3	6	5	4½	5	5½	5	17	43
2	Lebanon (A)	1½	●	5	3	3	4½	5	5½	6	5	14	38 1/2
3	Iraq	1½	1	●	4	3½	4½	4	6	3½	4	14	32
4	Jordan	3	3	2	●	3½	2½	5	3½	5½	4	12	32
5	Syria	0	3	2½	2½	●	3½	3	6	6	5	10	31 1/2
6	Kenya (A)	1	1½	1½	3½	2½	●	2½	6	4½	4	8	27
7	Tunisia	1½	1	2	1	3	3½	●	3	4	4	8	23
8	Mozambique	1	½	0	2½	0	0	3	●	4	5	5	16
9	Ethiopia (A)	½	0	2½	½	0	1½	2	2	●	5	2	14
10	Cape Verde (A)	1	1	2	2	1	2	2	1	1	●	0	13

Ireland, Lebanon and Iraq advanced to Division 2.

==== Pool C ====
Rank	Team	1	2	3	4	5	6	7	8	9	10	TB1	TB2
1	Scotland	●	2	5½	4	5½	4	5	4½	5½	5½	16	41 1/2
2	Angola (A)	4	●	2½	3	4½	4	5½	5	5½	5	15	39
3	Wales	½	3½	●	4½	2	5½	3½	4½	3½	3½	14	31
4	Zambia	2	3	1½	●	1½	4	4½	5	5	4	11	30 1/2
5	Botswana	½	1½	4	4½	●	1½	3	5	5	4	11	29
6	Nigeria	2	2	½	2	4½	●	4	4	2	5	8	26
7	United Arab Emirates	1	½	2½	1½	3	2	●	2	3	5	4	20 1/2
8	Palestine (A)	1½	1	1½	1	1	2	4	●	4	2½	4	18 1/2
9	ICCD	½	½	2½	1	1	4	3	2	●	3	4	17 1/2
10	Kosovo	½	1	2½	2	2	1	1	3½	3	●	3	16 1/2

Scotland, Angola and Wales advanced to Division 2.

==== Pool D ====
Rank	Team	1	2	3	4	5	6	7	8	9	10	TB1	TB2
1	Bolivia	●	4	2	5½	6	4½	5	5	5½	6	16	43 1/2
2	Uruguay	2	●	3½	3½	6	6	5½	3½	6	5	16	41
3	Paraguay	4	2½	●	2	5	6	4½	3½	6	6	14	39 1/2
4	Trinidad and Tobago (A)	½	2½	4	●	5½	4	4	3½	6	4½	14	34 1/2
5	Suriname (A)	0	0	1	½	●	1½	3½	3½	5	4½	8	19 1/2
6	Malawi (A)	1½	0	0	2	4½	●	1	3	5	4	7	21
7	Dominican Republic	1	½	1½	2	2½	5	●	6	1½	3½	6	23 1/2
8	Haiti (A)	1	2½	2½	2½	2½	3	0	●	3	3½	4	20 1/2
9	Cyprus (A)	½	0	0	0	1	1	3½	3	●	1½	3	10 1/2
10	Aruba (A)	0	1	0	1½	1½	2	2½	2½	4½	●	2	15 1/2

Bolivia, Uruguay and Paraguay advanced to Division 2.

==== Pool E ====
Rank	Team	1	2	3	4	5	6	7	8	9	10	TB1	TB2
1	Venezuela	●	5½	5½	4½	3½	5	4½	6	6	6	18	46 1/2
2	El Salvador	½	●	3½	3½	3½	3½	5	3	5½	4	15	32
3	Jamaica	½	2½	●	5½	4	4½	4½	5	5	6	14	37 1/2
4	Puerto Rico (A)	1½	2½	½	●	3	3½	3½	5	4½	6	11	30
5	Nicaragua	2½	2½	2	3	●	2½	4	4	5	4½	9	30
6	Panama	1	2½	1½	2½	3½	●	3	5	4	6	9	29
7	Barbados	1½	1	1½	2½	2	3	●	3	3½	5	6	23
8	Honduras	0	3	1	1	2	1	3	●	4½	4½	6	20
9	Namibia (A)	0	½	1	1½	1	2	2½	1½	●	4½	2	14 1/2
10	Ghana (A)	0	2	0	0	1½	0	1	1½	1½	●	0	7 1/2

Venezuela, El Salvador and Jamaica advanced to Division 2.

=== Division 2 ===
==== Pool A ====
Rank	Team	1	2	3	4	5	6	7	8	9	10	TB1	TB2
1	Indonesia	●	4½	3½	5	5½	3	3	6	5	5	16	40 1/2
2	Philippines	1½	●	3½	4	5	4	4 1/2½	4	5	4½	16	36
3	Shenzhen (China)	2½	2½	●	5	4½	4½	4½	6	3	5½	13	38
4	Australia	1	2	1	●	2½	3½	4	4½	6	4½	10	29
5	Kyrgyzstan	½	1	1½	3½	●	2	5	3½	3½	5	10	25 1/2
6	Singapore	3	2	1½	2½	4	●	2½	4½	5½	5	9	30 1/2
7	Bangladesh	3	1½	1½	2	1	3½	●	1½	5½	4½	7	24
8	Ireland (A)	0	2	0	1½	2½	1½	4½	●	4	3½	6	19 1/2
9	Lebanon (A)	1	1	3	0	2½	½	½	2	●	3	2	13 1/2
10	Chinese Taipei (A)	1	1½	½	1½	1	1	1½	2½	3	●	1	13 1/2

Indonesia, Shenzhen (China) and Australia advanced to Top Division.

==== Pool B ====
Rank	Team	1	2	3	4	5	6	7	8	9	10	TB1	TB2
1	Latvia	●	2½	3	4	3	3½	4½	6	5½	6	14	38
2	Moldova	3½	●	2	2½	4½	4½	4½	4	5½	4	14	35
3	Italy	3	4	●	3	2½	3	4½	4½	6	6	13	36 1/2
4	Estonia	2	3½	3	●	2	3½	3	4½	6	5	12	32 1/2
5	Uzbekistan	3	1½	3½	4	●	1½	3½	3	4	6	12	30
6	Malaysia (A)	2½	1½	3	2½	4½	●	3	2	4½	4½	8	28
7	Austria	1½	1½	1½	3	2½	3	●	4½	4	4½	8	26
8	Switzerland	0	2	1½	1½	3	4	1½	●	5	4	7	22 1/2
9	Wales (A)	½	½	0	0	2	1½	2	1	●	3½	2	11
10	Iraq (A)	0	2	0	1	0	1½	1½	2	2½	●	0	10 1/2

Latvia, Moldova and Italy advanced to Top Division.

==== Pool C ====
Rank	Team	1	2	3	4	5	6	7	8	9	10	TB1	TB2
1	Israel	●	3½	4½	3	4½	6	5	4½	5	5	17	41
2	Belarus	2½	●	4½	4½	6	4½	4½	4½	6	5½	16	42 1/2
3	Sweden	1½	1½	●	3	4½	5	5	3½	4½	5½	13	34
4	Sri Lanka (A)	3	1½	3	●	4	3½	4	2	4½	4½	12	30
5	Montenegro	1½	0	1½	2	●	2	4	3½	3½	5	8	23
6	Albania	0	1½	1	2½	4	●	3	4½	4½	2½	7	23 1/2
7	Portugal	1	1½	1	2	2	3	●	4	2	6	5	22 1/2
8	Norway	1½	1½	2½	4	2½	1½	2	●	2½	4½	4	22 1/2
9	Scotland (A)	1	0	1½	1½	2½	1½	4	3½	●	2½	4	18
10	Zimbabwe	1	½	½	1½	1	3½	0	1½	3½	●	4	13

Israel, Belarus and Sweden advanced to Top Division.

==== Pool D ====
Rank	Team	1	2	3	4	5	6	7	8	9	10	TB1	TB2
1	Slovenia	●	4	2	5	4½	5	6	3½	5	5½	16	40 1/2
2	Argentina	2	●	5	4½	5	3½	5	4½	5	6	16	40 1/2
3	Brazil	4	1	●	5	4	3	4½	3½	5	5	15	35
4	Venezuela (A)	1	1½	1	●	5	3½	5	3½	4½	3½	12	28 1/2
5	Algeria	1½	1	2	1	●	2½	5½	3½	3½	3½	8	24
6	Mexico	1	2½	3	2½	3½	●	2	3	3	5½	7	26
7	Angola (A)	0	1	1½	1	½	4	●	5½	3	6	7	22 1/2
8	Uruguay (A)	2½	1½	2½	2½	2½	3	½	●	4½	5½	5	25
9	South Africa	1	1	1	1½	2½	3	3	1½	●	2	2	16 1/2
10	Morocco	½	0	1	2½	2½	½	0	½	4	●	2	11 1/2

Slovenia, Argentina and Brazil advanced to Top Division.

==== Pool E ====
Rank	Team	1	2	3	4	5	6	7	8	9	10	TB1	TB2
1	Colombia	●	3	4	5	5	3½	5	5	5	3½	17	39
2	Cuba	3	●	4½	4½	3	4	4	5	3½	6	16	37 1/2
3	Paraguay (A)	2	1½	●	3	4	3	4½	4	3½	4	11	29 1/2
4	Chile	1	1½	3	●	3½	3½	3	3	4	4	11	26 1/2
5	Ecuador	1	3	2	2½	●	3	3½	3½	4	4	10	26 1/2
6	Bolivia (A)	2½	2	3	2½	3	●	3	4	3½	1½	7	25
7	Costa Rica	1	2	1½	3	2½	3	●	3½	2	4½	6	23
8	Jamaica (A)	1	1	2	3	2½	2	2½	●	5	5	5	24
9	Guatemala	1	2½	2½	2	2	2½	4	1	●	3	3	20 1/2
10	El Salvador (A)	2½	0	2	2	2	4½	1½	1	3	●	3	18 1/2

Colombia, Cuba and Paraguay advanced to Top Division.

=== Top Division ===
==== Pool A ====
Rank	Team	1	2	3	4	5	6	7	8	9	10	TB1	TB2
1	Kazakhstan	●	3½	2	3½	3½	4	4	5½	4½	3½	16	34
2	China	2½	●	3½	5	2	5	5	6	4	5½	14	38 1/2
3	Iran	4	2½	●	5	4	3	3½	3	4½	5½	14	35
4	Indonesia (A)	2½	1	1	●	5	3	4½	4	3½	3½	11	28
5	Armenia	2½	4	2	1	●	4½	4½	3	3½	3	10	28
6	Romania	2	1	3	3	1½	●	1½	3½	3	3½	7	22
7	Mongolia	2	1	2½	1½	1½	4½	●	3	3	4	6	23
8	Greece	½	0	3	2	3	2½	3	●	3	4	6	21
9	Georgia	1½	2	1½	2½	2½	3	3	3	●	2	3	21
10	Australia (A)	2½	½	½	2½	3	2½	2	2	4	●	3	19 1/2

Kazakhstan and China advanced to the playoffs.

==== Pool B ====
Rank	Team	1	2	3	4	5	6	7	8	9	10	TB1	TB2
1	India	●	4	4	5	3	3	4	3½	5	6	16	37 1/2
2	Hungary	2	●	4	4	3½	3½	4½	3	5	3½	15	33
3	Azerbaijan	2	2	●	3	3	4½	5½	3½	5	4	12	32 1/2
4	Shenzhen (China) (A)	1	2	3	●	3½	2½	3½	2½	5½	4	9	27 1/2
5	France	3	2½	3	2½	●	3½	2	3½	3	4½	9	27 1/2
6	Slovenia (A)	3	2½	1½	3½	2½	●	4	4	3	3	9	27
7	Sweden (A)	2	1½	½	2½	4	2	●	5½	4	5½	8	27 1/2
8	Belarus (A)	2½	3	2½	3½	2½	2	½	●	5½	4½	7	26 1/2
9	Moldova (A)	1	1	1	½	3	3	2	½	●	3½	4	15 1/2
10	Egypt	0	2½	2	2	1½	3	½	1½	2½	●	1	15 1/2

India and Hungary advanced to the playoffs.

==== Pool C ====
Rank	Team	1	2	3	4	5	6	7	8	9	10	TB1	TB2
1	Russia	●	4½	6	5	4	5	6	6	5	4½	18	46
2	Ukraine	1½	●	4½	3½	3½	3	4½	3½	5	4½	15	33 1/2
3	Germany	0	1½	●	4	4	5	5½	4	5½	6	14	35 1/2
4	Israel (A)	1	2½	2	●	3½	3½	2½	4	6	6	10	31
5	Spain	2	2½	2	2½	●	3	4	4	5½	3½	9	29
6	Italy (A)	1	3	1	2½	3	●	3½	2½	3½	4½	8	24 1/2
7	Argentina (A)	0	1½	½	3½	2	2½	●	3	5	4½	7	22 1/2
8	Latvia (A)	0	2½	2	2	2	3½	3	●	3	2½	4	20 1/2
9	Czech Republic	1	1	½	0	½	2½	1	3	●	3½	3	13
10	Paraguay (A)	1½	1½	0	0	2½	1½	1½	3½	2½	●	2	14 1/2

Russia and Ukraine advanced to the playoffs.

==== Pool D ====
Rank	Team	1	2	3	4	5	6	7	8	9	10	TB1	TB2
1	Poland	●	4½	3	5½	5	3	3½	4	4½	4½	16	37 1/2
2	United States	1½	●	4½	4½	3½	4½	4	5½	4½	4	16	36 1/2
3	Canada	3	1½	●	1½	4	4	3½	3½	5	5	13	31
4	Peru	½	1½	4½	●	2	4	4½	3½	3½	4½	12	28 1/2
5	Cuba (A)	1	2½	2	4	●	2	4½	3	3	5	8	27
6	Netherlands	3	1½	2	2	4	●	2	3½	3½	3	8	24 1/2
7	Brazil (A)	2½	2	2½	1½	1½	4	●	1½	4	3½	6	23
8	Colombia (A)	2	½	2½	2½	3	2½	4½	●	2½	3½	5	23 1/2
9	England	1½	1½	1	2½	3	2½	2	3½	●	3	4	20 1/2
10	Turkey	1½	2	1	1½	1	3	2½	2½	3	●	2	18

Poland and the United States advanced to the playoffs.

=== Playoffs ===
Quarter Finals (13 September)
C2	Ukraine	2	3½	1
B1	India	4	2½	5
A1	Kazakhstan	4	2½	2
D2	United States	2	3½	4
A2	China	4½	4
D1	Poland	1½	2
C1	Russia	3½	3½
B2	Hungary	2½	2½

Semi Finals (14 September)
B1	India	5	2	1½
D2	United States	1	4	4½
A2	China	2½	2
C1	Russia	3½	4

Final (15 September)
D2	United States	2½	2½
C1	Russia	3½	3½

== Medalists ==
Gold	Silver	Bronze	
Russia; Alexander Grischuk; Daniil Dubov; Aleksandra Goryachkina; Alexandra Kosteniuk; Andrey Esipenko; Polina Shuvalova; Vladislav Artemiev; Vladimir Fedoseev; Kateryna Lagno; Valentina Gunina; Volodar Murzin; Leya Garifullina	United States of America; Jeffery Xiong; Ray Robson; Irina Krush; Anna Zatonskih; Awonder Liang; Thalia Cervantes Landeiro; Dariusz Swiercz; Nazi Paikidze	China; Ding Liren; Wei Yi; Hou Yifan; Ju Wenjun; Xu Zhihang; Zhu Jiner; Yu Yangyi; Bu Xiangzhi; Lei Tingjie; Huang Qian; Wang Shixu; Ning Kaiyu	India; Viswanathan Anand; Vidit Gujrathi; Koneru Humpy; Harika Dronavalli; Nihal Sarin; Vaishali Rameshbabu; Pentala Harikrishna; Adhiban Baskaran; Tania Sachdev; Bhakti Kulkarni; Praggnanandhaa Rameshbabu; Savitha Shri Baskar
