= Barbados at the 2014 Summer Youth Olympics =

- IOC code: BAR
- NOC: Barbados Olympic Association

in Nanjing
- Competitors: 8 in 2 sports
- Medals: Gold 0 Silver 0 Bronze 0 Total 0

Summer Youth Olympics appearances
- 2010; 2014; 2018

Barbados competed at the 2014 Summer Youth Olympics, in Nanjing, China from 16 August to 28 August 2014.

== Athletics ==
Barbados qualified five athletes.

Qualification Legend: Q=Final A (medal); qB=Final B (non-medal); qC=Final C (non-medal); qD=Final D (non-medal); qE=Final E (non-medal)

Boys
Track & road events

Athlete	Event	Heats		Final	
Athlete	Event	Result	Rank	Result	Rank
Ramarco Thompson	200 m	21.95	13 qB	22.31	11
Michael Nicholls	110 m hurdles	13.70	9 qB	DNF	
Rivaldo Leacock	400 m hurdles	DNF qB		DNS	

Girls
Track & road events

Athlete	Event	Heats		Final	
Athlete	Event	Result	Rank	Result	Rank
Tristan Evelyn	100 m	11.81	6 Q	11.95	7
Sada Williams	400 m	54.26	7 Q	54.93	8

== Swimming ==
Barbados qualified three swimmers.

Boys

Athlete	Event	Heat		Final	
Athlete	Event	Time	Rank	Time	Rank
Anthony Selby	200 m freestyle	1:56.34	28	did not advance	
Anthony Selby	400 m freestyle	4:06.24	28	did not advance	

Girls

Athlete	Event	Heat		Semifinal		Final	
Athlete	Event	Time	Rank	Time	Rank	Time	Rank
Zabrina Holder	50 m freestyle	27.65	33	did not advance			
Zabrina Holder	100 m butterfly	1:06.16	28	did not advance			
Hannah Gill	400 m freestyle	4:31.78	27	—		did not advance	
Hannah Gill	800 m freestyle	—				9:16.46	22
