= Vajda =

Vajda is a Hungarian language surname. It is derived from Proto-Slavic *vojevoda. In medieval times, vajda was the equivalent of voivode, meaning a "war-leader" or "war-lord". Notable people with the surname include:

- Anna Vajda (born 1984), Hungarian basketball player
- Árpád Vajda (1896–1967), Hungarian chess player
- Attila Vajda (born 1983), Hungarian athlete
- Botond Vajda (born 2004), Hungarian footballer
- Christopher Vajda (born 1955), British jurist
- Edward Vajda (born 1958), American linguist
- Ernest Vajda (1886–1954), Hungarian actor
- Georges Vajda (1908–1981), French historian and islamologist
- Géza Vajda (born 1950), Hungarian orienteer
- Gregory Vajda (born 1973), Hungarian musician
- Huba Vajda (born 2000), Hungarian handball player
- Ivan Vajda (born 1978), Croatian tennis player
- János Vajda, multiple people
- Jaroslav Vajda (1919–2008), American hymn composer
- Ladislao Vajda (1906–1965), Hungarian film director
- Ladislaus Vajda (1878–1933), Hungarian screenwriter
- László Vajda (figure skater) (born 1954), Hungarian figure skater
- Lajos Vajda (1908–1941), Hungarian painter
- Levente Vajda (born 1981), Romanian chess grandmaster
- Marián Vajda (born 1965), Slovak tennis coach and former player
- Markó vajda (1580–1629), Prince of Moldavia better known as Marcu Cercel
- Mihály András Vajda (1935–2023), Hungarian philosopher
- Oršoja Vajda (born 1997), Serbian footballer
- Patrik Vajda (born 1989), Slovak footballer
- Stěpan Vajda (1922–1945), Czechoslovak officer
- Steven Vajda (1901–1995), Hungarian mathematician
- Szidonia Vajda (born 1979), Romanian chess player
- Thomas Vajda, American diplomat
- Vivi Vajda (born 1964), Swedish paleontologist

== See also ==
- Wajda
