= Adolf Seitz =

German–Argentine chess master and journalist

Jakob Adolf Seitz (February 14, 1898, Meitingen, Germany – April 6, 1970, Switzerland) was a German–Argentine chess master and journalist.

== Career ==
In 1920, he tied for 2-4th in Canterbury, took 10th in Berlin, and tied for 4-5th in Kulmbach. In 1921, he tied for 8-9th in Hamburg. In 1922, he tied for 2nd-3rd in London (Major Open). In 1922/23 he tied for 6-9th in Portsmouth/Southsea. In 1923, he tied for 6-7th in Triest. In 1923/24 he tied for 5-6th in Hastings (Max Euwe won). In 1924, he took 13th in Győr. 1924/25 he took 3rd in Hastings (Géza Maróczy won). In 1925, he tied for 6-10th in Debrecen. In 1925, he took 3rd in Bologna (Mario Monticelli won). In 1925/26 he tied for 3-4th in Hastings (Alexander Alekhine and Milan Vidmar won).

In 1926, he tied for 6-7th in Milan, and tied for 3-4th in Scarborough. In 1927, he took 2nd, behind Stefano Rosselli del Turco, in Naples, and tied for 3-4th in London. In 1928, he tied for 3-4th in Cheltenham, tied for 4-5th in Dortmund, and tied for 1st-2nd with George Koltanowski in Tenby. In 1929, he took 10th in Paris (Savielly Tartakower won), tied for 4-7th in Duisburg (Carl Ahues won), and tied for 1st-2nd with Vajda in Ramsgate (B tourn). In 1930, he tied for 3-4th in Scarborough, and took 7th in Nice (Tartakower won).

In 1931, he tied for 5-8th in Nice (Brian Reilly won). In 1933, he tied for 11-12th in Bad Pyrmont (1st GER-ch; Efim Bogoljubow won). In 1934, he tied for 3-6th in Bad Salzuflen. In 1935, he took 2nd, behind Samuel Reshevsky, in Great Yarmouth. In 1935, he took 7th in Helsinki (Eero Böök and Rudolf Spielmann won). In 1938, he took 16th in Łódź (Vasja Pirc won).

In September 1939, when World War II was broke out, Seitz along with all German players (Eliskases, Michel, Engels, Becker, Reinhardt) and many other participants of the 8th Olympiad in Buenos Aires decided to stay permanently in Argentina.

After World War Two, he returned to Europe. In 1953 he represented Italy whilst living in Norway. He later lived in Switzerland and West Germany.
