= János Vajda =

János Vajda may refer to:

- János Vajda (poet) (1827–1897), Hungarian poet
- János Vajda (composer) (born 1949), Hungarian composer
