= Szymon Gumularz =

Polish chess grandmaster (born 2001)

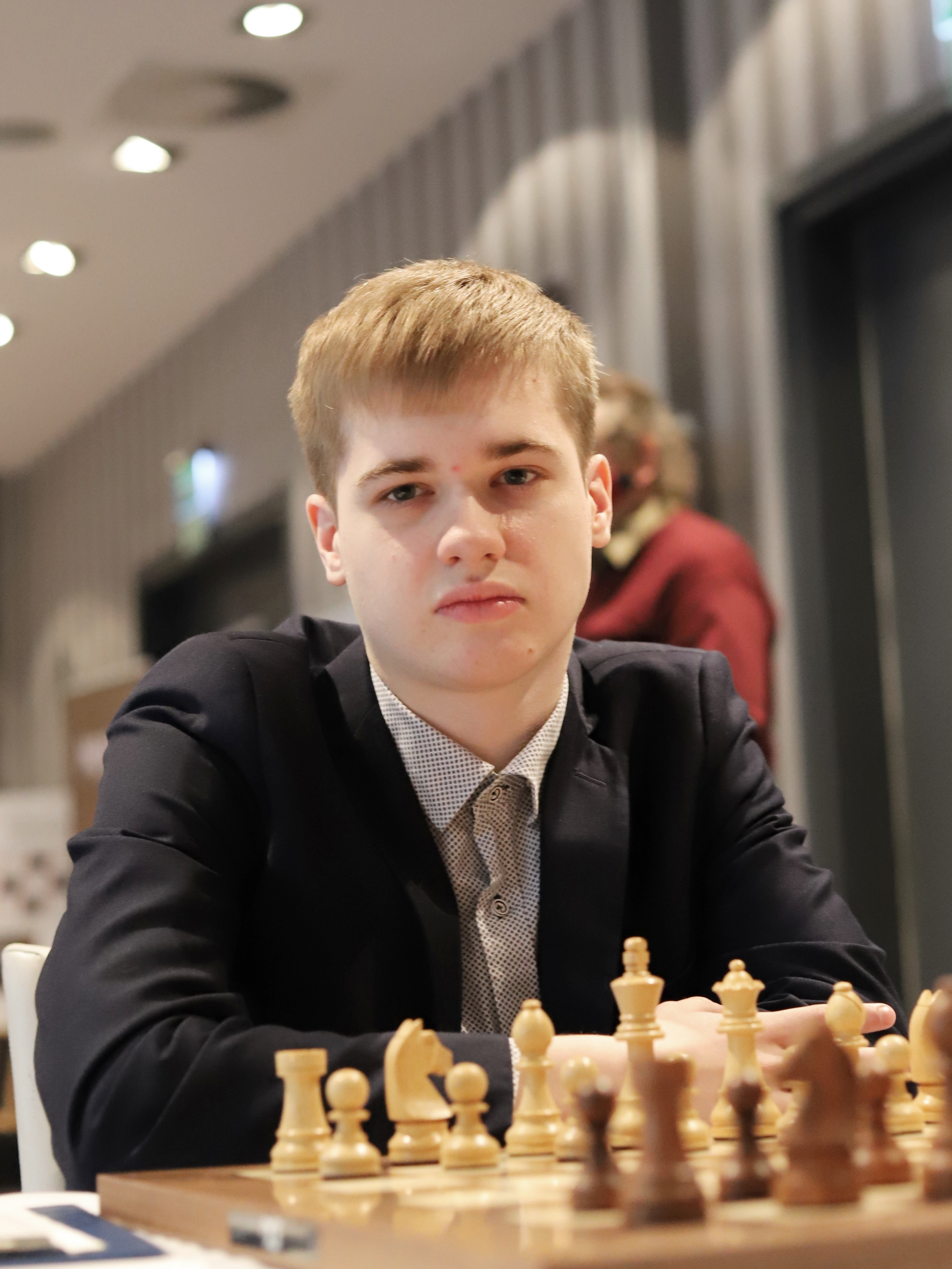
- Szymon Gumularz in 2021

Personal information
- Born: 22 December 2001 (age 24) Myślenice, Poland

Chess career
- Country: Poland
- Title: Grandmaster (2021)
- FIDE rating: 2618 (July 2026)
- Peak rating: 2625 (August 2026)

Szymon Gumularz (born 22 December 2001) is a Polish chess grandmaster.

== Biography ==
Szymon Gumularz made his chess debut at the 2013 European Youth Chess Championship in Budva, where he finished 20th. He won medals of the Polish Youth Chess Championships three times: gold in Wałbrzych in 2013 (U12 age group), bronze in Suwałki in 2015 (U14 age group) and gold in Ustroń in 2017 (U16 age group).

Szymon Gumularz was also a seven-time medalist of the Polish Youth Rapid Chess Championships (including three times gold: Wrocław 2014 – U14 age group, Katowice 2015 – U14 age group and Koszalin 2016 – U16 age group) and a six-time medalist of the Polish Youth Blitz Chess Championships (including three times gold: Olsztyn 2013 – U12 age group, Katowice 2015 – U14 age group and Wrocław 2017 – U16 age group).

Szymon Gumularz represented Poland at European Youth Chess Championships (4 times) and World Youth Chess Championships (3 times) in various age groups, achieving the best result in 2017 in Montevideo – 3rd place in World Youth Chess Championship in U16 age group.

Szymon Gumularz won the International chess tournaments four times: 2014 in Góra Świętej Anny (open B), 2017 in Mariánské Lázně (open B3), 2018 in Kraków (Cracovia 2017/18, open A), together with Christopher Repka and Evgeny Romanov and 2019 in Krakow (Cracovia 2019/20, open A).

Since 2019, Szymon Gumularz has regularly participated in the finals of the Polish Chess Championships. In 2023, he finished at 3rd place. In May 2024, in Rzeszów he ranked in 7th place in Polish Chess Championship. In 2026, he won the Polish Championship in Warsaw.

In 2018, Szymon Gumularz was awarded the FIDE International Master (IM) title and received the FIDE Grandmaster (GM) title three years later. He reached the highest rating in his career so far on June 1, 2023, with a score of 2591 points.
