= Xu Zhihang =

Chinese chess grandmaster (born 2001)

Personal information
- Born: November 8, 2001 (age 24) Qingdao, Shandong

Chess career
- Country: China
- Title: Grandmaster (2026)
- FIDE rating: 2482 (September 2026)
- Peak rating: 2515 (June 2021)

Xu Zhihang (Chinese: 徐志行) is a Chinese chess grandmaster.

== Chess career ==
In May 2021, he played in the Chinese Chess Championship, where he was the only IM in the open section and was half a point behind the leaders after the seventh round. He ultimately finished in 10th place, but scored wins against Li Di and Xu Yi.

In September 2021, he played for China in the FIDE Online Chess Olympiad 2021, where the team tied for the bronze medal.

He achieved the Grandmaster title in 2026 after earning his norms at the:

- GM Third Saturday 83 in November 2018
- GM Third Saturday 114 in April 2019
- Chess Summer in Sarajevo GM Mix in June 2026
