= Alicja Śliwicka =

Polish chess player (born 2001)

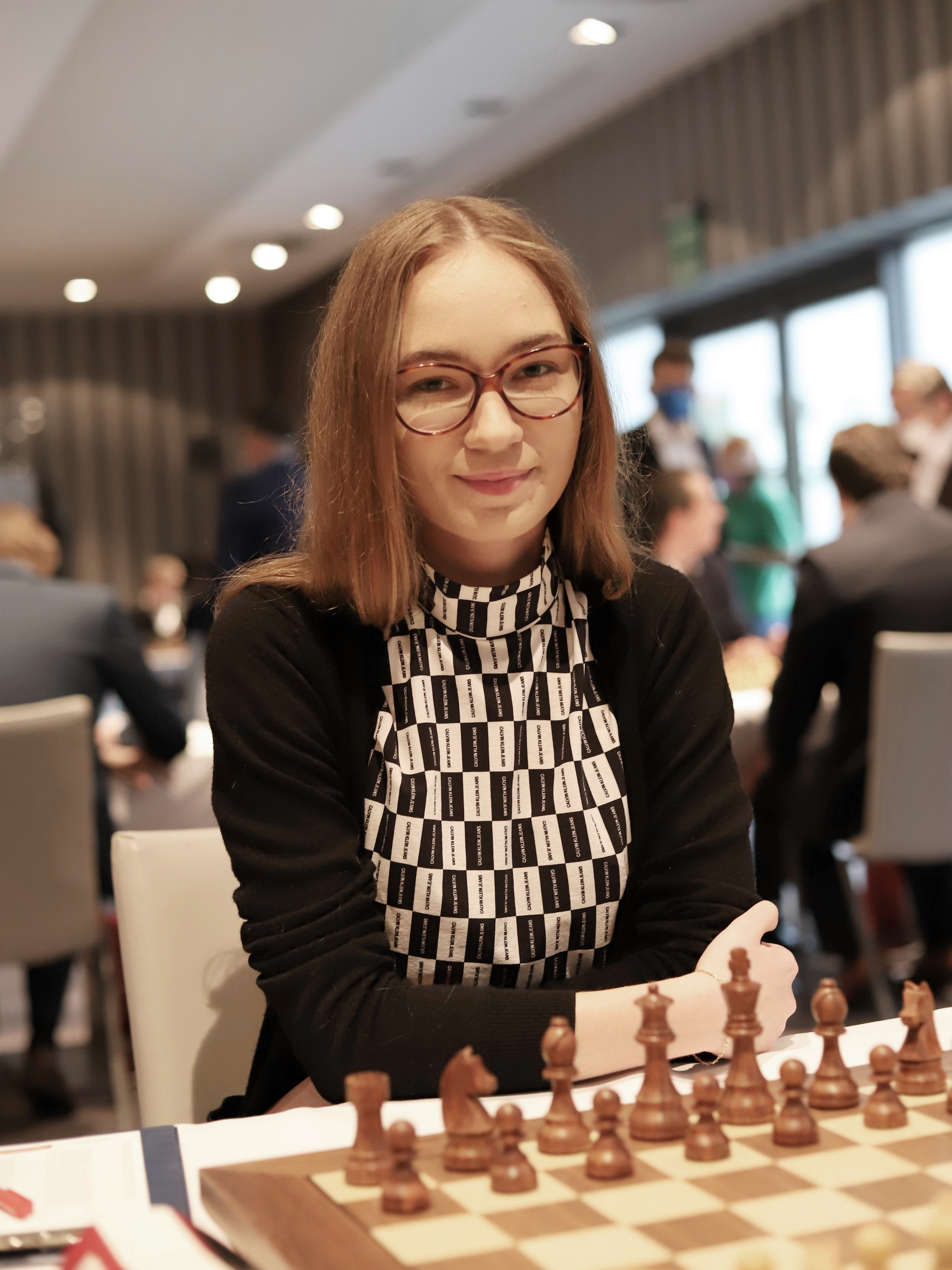
- Śliwicka in 2021

Personal information
- Born: 1 September 2001 (age 24) Świecie, Poland

Chess career
- Country: Poland
- Title: Woman Grandmaster (2024)
- Peak rating: 2380 (November 2024)

Alicja Śliwicka (born 1 September 2001) is a Polish chess player. She received the FIDE title of Woman Grandmaster in 2024.

== Biography ==
Śliwicka many times participated in the Polish Youth Chess Championships in different girls' age groups, where she won five medals: gold (2015 – U14), three silver (2009 – U08, 2011 – U10, 2013 – U12) and bronze (2007 – U07).

She repeatedly represented Poland at the European Youth Chess Championships and World Youth Chess Championships in different age groups, where she won three medals: 2 gold (in 2011, at the European Youth Chess Championship in the U10 girls age group; in 2019, at the European Youth Chess Championship in the U18 girls age group) and silver (in 2015, at the World Youth Chess Championship in the U14 girls age group). In 2010, in Warsaw Alicja Śliwicka won European Youth Chess Blitz Championship in the U10 girls age group.

Alicja Śliwicka three times participated in the European Girls' U18 Team Chess Championships (2015–2017), where she won silver (2016) and bronze (2015) medals in team scoring, as well as two bronze (2015, 2016) medals in individual scoring.

In 2023 in Warsaw she ranked 5th in Polish Women's Chess Championship.

In May 2024, in Rzeszów she ranked in 6th place in Polish Women's Chess Championship.

In 2018, she received the FIDE Woman International Master (WIM) title. In 2024, she received the Woman Grandmaster (WGM) title.
