= Ning Kaiyu =

Chinese chess player (born 2004)

Personal information
- Born: September 10, 2004 (age 21) Kaifeng, Henan

Chess career
- Country: China
- Title: Woman International Master (2019)
- Peak rating: 2387 (October 2022)

Ning Kaiyu (Chinese: 宁凯玉) is a Chinese chess player.

== Chess career ==
In October 2018, she won the Girls U14 section of the World Youth Chess Championship.

In June 2020, she tied for first place with Törmönkhiin Mönkhzul in the Asian Girls Online Chess Championship, winning the championship due to better tiebreak scores.

In August 2021, she finished as runner-up to Bibisara Assaubayeva in the Asian Women's Continental Online Chess Championship.
