= Julia Antolak =

Polish chess player (born 2000)

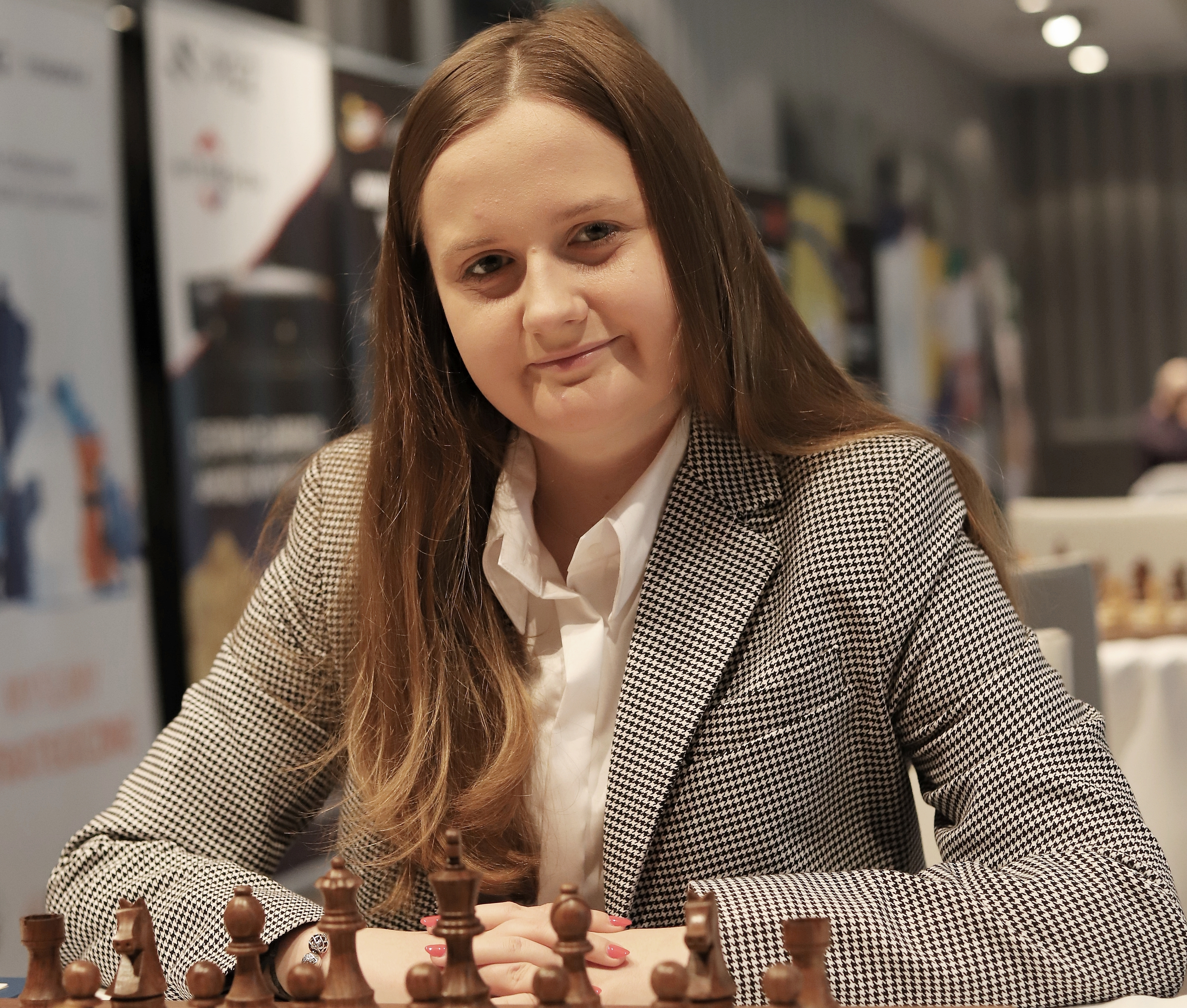
- Julia Antolak in 2021

Personal information
- Born: 22 February 2000 (age 26) Kołobrzeg, Poland

Chess career
- Country: Poland
- Title: Woman Grandmaster (2021)
- Peak rating: 2399 (June 2022)

Julia Antolak (born 22 February 2000) is a Polish chess Woman Grandmaster (WGM) (2021).

== Biography ==
Julia Antolak is a student of chess trainer Witalis Sapis. She has been successful since childhood. Julia Antolak won 6 medals of the Polish Youth Chess Championships in classical chess (2 gold - 2012 - U12, 2014 - U14; 2 silver - 2017 - U18, 2018 - U18; 2 bronze - 2008 - U8, 2013 - U14), as well as a gold medal of the Polish Kindergarten Championships (2007) and 6 medals in the Polish Youth Rapid Chess Championships and 8 medals in the Polish Youth Blitz Chess Championships. She represented Poland many times at the World and European Youth Chess Championships, winning a bronze medal individually (2015 - U16), and as a team - 3 medals (gold - 2018 - U18; silver - 2017 - U18; bronze - 2016 - U18). Julia Antolak competed at the Junior Chess Olympics (2016 - U16) and the World Team Rapid Chess Championship (2021). She is a bronze medalist of Polish Team Chess Championship (2020), bronze medalist of the Polish Academic Team Chess Championship (2020), gold medalist of the Women's Academic World Rapid Chess Championship (2021), silver medalist of the Polish Women's Team Blitz Chess Championship (2019), two-time medalist of the Polish Women's Chess Championship in U20 age group (2019, 2020).

From 2020 Julia Antolak participated in Polish Women's Chess Championship finals, the best result achieved in 2023 in Warsaw when she won silver medal. In May 2024, in Rzeszów she ranked in 5th place in Polish Women's Chess Championship.

Julia Antolak represents the GKSz "Solny" Grzybowo club.

In 2020 (from March to August) she was ranked 21-23 among juniors on the world lists FIDE. The highest rating in her career so far - 2399 points - was reached on June 1, 2022.

In 2019, Julia Antolak was awarded the FIDE Women International Master (WIM) title and received the FIDE Women Grandmaster (WGM) title two years later.
