= Endre Steiner =

Hungarian chess player (1901–1944)

Endre (Andreas) Steiner (27 June 1901 – 29 December 1944) was a Hungarian chess player, born in Budapest.

Endre Steiner played for Hungary in five official and one unofficial Chess Olympiads.

- In 1927, he played at first reserve board at 1st Chess Olympiad in London (+6 –2 =5).
- In 1928, he played at second board at 2nd Chess Olympiad in The Hague (+10 –3 =3).
- In 1930, he played at first reserve board at 3rd Chess Olympiad in Hamburg (+7 –2 =5).
- In 1931, he played at first board at 4th Chess Olympiad in Prague (+5 –7 =3).
- In 1936, he played at third board at the unofficial Olympiad in Munich (+11 –6 =1).
- In 1937, he played at third board at 7th Chess Olympiad in Stockholm (+12 –1 =5).

He thrice won the team gold medal (1927, 1928 and 1936), twice won a team silver medal (1930 and 1937), and once won an individual silver medal (1937).

He died as a Jewish forced laborer during the Soviet storming of Budapest on 29 December 1944.

Endre was the elder brother of Lajos Steiner.

== See also ==
- List of Jewish chess players
