= Géza Nagy =

Hungarian chess player

Géza Nagy (29 December 1892 in Satoraljaujhely – 13 August 1953 in Kaposvár) was a Hungarian chess master.

He was Hungarian Champion in 1924. He took 6th at Budapest 1926 (Grandmasters Ernst Grünfeld and Mario Monticelli won).

Nagy played for Hungary in Chess Olympiads:

- In 1927 at second board in 1st Chess Olympiad in London (+8 –3 =3);
- In 1928 at first board in 2nd Chess Olympiad in The Hague (+9 –2 =5).

He won two team gold medals there.

Nagy was awarded the International Master (IM) title in 1950.
