= Hallström =

Hallström is a Swedish surname. Notable people with the surname include:

- Charlie Hallstrom (1863–1949), Swedish baseball player
- Donald L. Hallstrom (born 1949), authority of the LDS Church
- Edward Hallstrom (1886–1970), Australian philanthropist and businessman
- Fredrik Hallström (born 1966), Swedish curler
- Holly Hallstrom (born 1952), model on The Price Is Right from 1977 to 1995
- Ivar Hallström (1826–1901), Swedish composer
- Jonas Hällström (born 1972) Swedish philatelist
- Lasse Hallström (born 1946), Swedish film director
- Leo Hällström (1936–2014), Finnish chess master
- Mary Jeanne Hallstrom (1924–2006), American politician from Illinois
- Pär Hallström (born 1947), Swedish writer and academic
- Per Hallström (1866–1960), Swedish writer
- Peter Hallström (born 1965), Swedish songwriter
- Rickard Hallström (born 1973), Swedish curler
- Robert Hallstrom (born 1955), American politician from Nebraska
- Roland af Hällström (1905–1956), Finnish film director
- Ron Hallstrom (born 1959), American football player
- Sten Hallström, Swedish DJ and record producer

== See also ==
- 2640 Hällström, main belt asteroid
- Hallstrom House, historic house in Vero Beach, Florida
