= 12th Chess Olympiad =

1956 chess tournament in Moscow, Russia

The official logo of the Olympiad

The 12th Chess Olympiad (12-я Шахматная олимпиада, 12-ya Shakhmatnaya olimpiada), organized by the FIDE and comprising a team tournament, took place between August 31 and September 25, 1956, in Moscow, Soviet Union.

The host nation were double defending champions and naturally huge favourites, and they lived up to expectations. Although their victory margin wasn't as big as two years before, they still won comfortably, with Yugoslavia and Hungary taking home the silver and bronze medals, respectively.

== Results ==
=== Preliminaries ===
A total of 34 teams entered the competition and were divided into four preliminary groups of eight or nine teams. The top three from each group advanced to Final A, the teams placed 4th–6th to Final B, and the rest to Final C. All groups and finals were played as round-robin tournaments.

Group 1 was won by the Soviet hosts, well ahead of Bulgaria and Switzerland. Poland, Sweden, and Norway took the places 4–6, while Puerto Rico and Saar finished at the bottom of the group.

Yugoslavia took first place in group 2, ahead of Israel and Denmark. Netherlands, Austria, and France made up the middle part of the group, while Mongolia and Scotland had to settle for the bottom.

Group 3 was won by Argentina, ahead of West Germany and England. Iceland, Chile, and Finland took the places 4–6, while India, Luxembourg, and Ireland finished at the bottom of the group.

Hungary clinched group 4, ahead of Romania and Czechoslovakia. East Germany, Colombia, and Belgium made up the middle part of the group, while the Philippines, Greece, and Iran completed the field.

- Group 1

Final	Country	1	2	3	4	5	6	7	8	+	−	=	Points
«A»	Soviet Union	-	2½	2½	4	3	4	4	3½	7	0	0	23½
«A»	Bulgaria	1½	-	3	2½	2½	3	3½	3½	6	1	0	19½
«A»	Switzerland	1½	1	-	3½	2	3	4	3	4	2	1	18
«B»	Poland	0	1½	½	-	3	3	3	4	4	3	0	15
«B»	Sweden	1	1½	2	1	-	2½	3	3½	3	3	1	14½
«B»	Norway	0	1	1	1	1½	-	2	2½	1	5	1	9
«C»	Puerto Rico	0	½	0	1	1	2	-	2½	1	5	1	7
«C»	Saar	½	½	1	0	½	1½	1½	-	0	7	0	5½

- Group 2

Final	Country	1	2	3	4	5	6	7	8	+	−	=	Points
«A»	Yugoslavia	-	2½	3	3½	3½	3	4	4	7	0	0	23½
«A»	Israel	1½	-	1½	2	3	2½	4	3½	4	2	1	18
«A»	Denmark	1	2½	-	2	2	2	4	3	3	1	3	16½
«B»	Netherlands	½	2	2	-	2½	3	3	3	4	1	2	16
«B»	Austria	½	1	2	1½	-	1½	2½	4	2	4	1	13
«B»	France	1	1½	2	1	2½	-	1½	3	2	4	1	12½
«C»	Mongolia	0	0	0	1	1½	2½	-	2½	2	5	0	7½
«C»	Scotland	0	½	1	1	0	1	1½	-	0	7	0	5

- Group 3

Final	Country	1	2	3	4	5	6	7	8	9	+	−	=	Points
«A»	Argentina	-	2½	1½	2	3½	2½	4	4	4	6	1	1	24
«A»	West Germany	1½	-	2½	2	2½	3	4	3½	4	6	1	1	23
«A»	England	2½	1½	-	2	2½	3½	4	3	3½	6	1	1	22½
«B»	Iceland	2	2	2	-	1	2½	3	4	4	4	1	3	20½
«B»	Chile	½	1½	1½	3	-	2½	1½	3½	3½	4	4	0	17½
«B»	Finland	1½	1	½	1½	1½	-	2	3½	3	2	5	1	14½
«C»	India	0	0	0	1	2½	2	-	3½	3½	3	4	1	12½
«C»	Luxembourg	0	½	1	0	½	½	½	-	2½	1	7	0	5½
«C»	Ireland	0	0	½	0	½	1	½	1½	-	0	8	0	4

- Group 4

Final	Country	1	2	3	4	5	6	7	8	9	+	−	=	Points
«A»	Hungary	-	2½	2	2	2	3½	3½	3½	4	5	0	3	23
«A»	Romania	1½	-	2	2½	2½	2½	3½	4	3	6	1	1	21½
«A»	Czechoslovakia	2	2	-	2	2½	2	4	3	4	4	0	4	21½
«B»	East Germany	2	1½	2	-	1	2½	3	4	2½	4	2	2	18½
«B»	Colombia	2	1½	1½	3	-	2	1½	4	2½	3	3	2	18
«B»	Belgium	½	1½	2	1½	2	-	3	2½	1½	2	4	2	14½
«C»	Philippines	½	½	0	1	2½	1	-	1½	3	2	6	0	10
«C»	Greece	½	0	1	0	0	1½	2½	–	3	2	6	0	8½
«C»	Iran	0	1	0	1½	1½	2½	1	1	-	1	7	0	8½

=== Final ===
Final A
#	Country	Players	Points	MP
1	Soviet Union	Botvinnik, Smyslov, Keres, Bronstein, Taimanov, Geller	31	
2	Yugoslavia	Gligorić, Matanović, Ivkov, Karaklajić, Milić, Đurašević	26½	17
3	Hungary	Szabó, Barcza, Benkő, Szilágyi, Bély, Portisch	26½	16
4	Argentina	Najdorf, Bolbochán, Panno, Pilnik, Sanguineti, Wexler	23	
5	West Germany	Unzicker, Schmid, Darga, Pfeiffer, Niephaus, Teschner	22	12
6	Bulgaria	Padevsky, Minev, Kolarov, Tringov, Tsvetkov, Milev	22	10
7	Czechoslovakia	Filip, Pachman, Šefc, Rejfíř, Alster, Ježek	20½	
8	England	Golombek, Penrose, Wade, Milner-Barry, Clarke, Phillips	20	
9	Switzerland	Blau, Bhend, Walther, Keller, Johner	19	9
10	Denmark	Larsen, Poulsen, Pedersen, Ingerslev, Nielsen, Enevoldsen	19	8
11	Romania	Bălănel, Ciocâltea, Troianescu, Soós, Ghițescu, Rădulescu	19	7
12	Israel	Czerniak, Porat, Aloni, Oren, Dobkin, Smiltiner	15½	

Final B
#	Country	Players	Points	MP
13	Austria	Robatsch, Dückstein, Kinzel, Prameshuber, Lokvenc, Busek	28	
14	Iceland	Ólafsson, Jóhannsson, Möller, Thorbergsson, Gíslason, Guðmundsson	27	
15	Sweden	Ståhlberg, Stenborg, Sköld, Backlund, Joffe, Ljungqvist	26½	
16	Belgium	O'Kelly, Dunkelblum, Limbos, Thibaut, Boey, Van den Broeck	23½	
17	Finland	Ojanen, Salo, Rantanen, Fred, Hänninen, Niemelä	22½	
18	Colombia	Cuéllar, Sánchez, De Greiff, Velandia, Restrepo, Reyes Larenas	21	11
19	Netherlands	Prins, Kramer, Bouwmeester, Mühring, Van Steenis	21	10
20	East Germany	Uhlmann, Dittmann, Herrmann, Fuchs, Koch, Platz	20½	
21	France	Muffang, Boutteville, Burstein, Noradounguian, Catozzi	19½	
22	Chile	Flores, Letelier, Hausman, Jáuregui, Jiménez Rojas, Mallett	19	9
23	Poland	Śliwa, Plater, Dworzyński, Gromek, Szapiro, Balcarek	19	7
24	Norway	Vestøl, Morcken, Lindblom, Johannessen, Barda, Rojahn	16½	

Final C
#	Country	Players	Points	MP
25	Philippines	Badilles, Campomanes, Benítez, Cardoso	24	
26	Saar	Benkner, Lorson, Weichselbaumer, Folz V., Both G., Schmidt P.	23	
27	India	Sapre, Gupta, Mhaiskar, Venkatraman S.	20½	
28	Iran	Safvat, Mostafavi-Kachani, Navabi, Lotfy, Assar, Nazarian	19	
29	Puerto Rico	Colón Romero A., Colón Romero M., Pla, Benítez, Borrás, Reissmann	18½	11
30	Mongolia	Zhugder, Zhamsaran, Möömöö, Tumurbator, Tserendagva, Namzhil	18½	9
31	Scotland	Fairhurst, Fallone, McGowan, Thomson, Middleton, Rose M.	17½	
32	Greece	Siaperas, Angos, Loverdos, Anastasopoulos, Mastihiadis, Pavlatos	17	
33	Ireland	Maher, Reilly, Walsh, Dunphy, Grogan, O'Riordan	13	
34	Luxembourg	Wantz, Conrady, Schneider, Schmitz F., Philippe, Kremer	9	

Final A

No.	Country	1	2	3	4	5	6	7	8	9	10	11	12	+	−	=	Points
1	Soviet Union	-	2½	1½	2½	3	2½	3½	4	3	3½	2½	2½	10	1	0	31
2	Yugoslavia	1½	-	2	2	2½	3	2½	2½	3	3	2	2½	7	1	3	26½
3	Hungary	2½	2	-	1½	2	2	2½	2	3	2½	2½	4	6	1	4	26½
4	Argentina	1½	2	2½	-	1½	1½	3	2½	2	1½	1½	3½	4	5	2	23
5	West Germany	1	1½	2	2½	-	2½	1½	2	1½	2½	2½	2½	5	4	2	22
6	Bulgaria	1½	1	2	2½	1½	-	2	1½	3	2½	1½	3	4	5	2	22
7	Czechoslovakia	½	1½	1½	1	2½	2	-	2	1½	2	3	3	3	5	3	20½
8	England	0	1½	2	1½	2	2½	2	-	2½	1½	2½	2	3	4	4	20
9	Switzerland	1	1	1	2	2½	1	2½	1½	-	2	2	2½	3	5	3	19
10	Denmark	½	1	1½	2½	1½	1½	2	2½	2	-	3	1	3	6	2	19
11	Romania	1½	2	1½	2½	1½	2½	1	1½	2	1	-	2	2	6	3	19
12	Israel	1½	1½	0	½	1½	1	1	2	1½	3	2	-	1	8	2	15½

Final B

No.	Country	13	14	15	16	17	18	19	20	21	22	23	24	+	−	=	Points
13	Austria	-	2	0	2	3	2½	3½	3	3	3	2½	3½	8	1	2	28
14	Iceland	2	-	2	1½	2	3	3	3½	3	2½	3	1½	6	2	3	27
15	Sweden	4	2	-	2½	2½	3½	2½	1½	3	1½	2	1½	6	3	2	26½
16	Belgium	2	2½	1½	-	3	2	1	1½	2	3	2½	2½	5	3	3	23½
17	Finland	1	2	1½	1	-	3	1½	2½	3	3	2	2	4	4	3	22½
18	Colombia	1½	1	½	2	1	-	2	2½	2½	2	3	3	4	4	3	21
19	Netherlands	½	1	1½	3	2½	2	-	3	2	3	1½	1	4	2	5	21
20	East Germany	1	½	2½	2½	1½	1½	1	-	1½	3	2½	3	5	6	0	20½
21	France	1	1	1	2	1	1½	2	2½	-	1½	2	4	2	6	3	19½
22	Chile	1	1½	2½	1	1	2	1	1	2½	-	2½	3	4	6	1	19
23	Poland	1½	1	2	1½	2	1	2½	1½	2	1½	-	2½	2	6	3	19
24	Norway	½	2½	2½	1½	2	1	3	1	1	1	1½	-	3	7	1	16½

Final C

No.	Country	25	26	27	28	29	30	31	32	33	34	+	−	=	Points
25	Philippines	-	1½	1½	3½	3	2½	2	3	3	4	6	2	1	24
26	Saar	2½	-	2	2½	2	2	2½	3	2½	4	6	0	3	23
27	India	2½	2	-	2	3½	1½	1½	2½	3	2	4	2	3	20½
28	Iran	½	1½	2	-	1½	2½	3	1½	3	3½	4	4	1	19
29	Puerto Rico	1	2	½	2½	-	2	3	3	2	2½	4	2	3	18½
30	Mongolia	1½	2	2½	1½	2	-	2	2	2	3	2	2	5	18½
31	Scotland	2	1½	2½	1	1	2	-	2½	2	3	3	3	3	17½
32	Greece	1	1	1½	2½	1	2	1½	-	3	3½	3	5	1	17
33	Ireland	1	1½	1	1	2	2	2	1	-	1½	0	6	3	13
34	Luxembourg	0	0	2	½	1½	1	1	½	2½	-	1	7	1	9

=== Individual medals ===
- Board 1: (Denmark) Bent Larsen 14 / 18 = 77.8%
- Board 2: (Austria) Andreas Dückstein 13 / 17 = 76.5%
- Board 3: (Soviet Union) Paul Keres 9½ / 12 = 79.2%
- Board 4: (Soviet Union) David Bronstein 11 / 13 = 84.6%
- 1st reserve: (Argentina) Raúl Sanguineti 9 / 11 = 81.8%
- 2nd reserve: (Soviet Union) Efim Geller 7½ / 10 = 75.0%

Due to a special rule for the top board at Olympiads, Larsen's result automatically earned him the GM title (the rule has since been abolished).
