= Gorson =

Gorson is a surname. Notable people with the surname include:

- Aaron Harry Gorson (1872–1933), American artist
- Arthur Gorson, American film and record producer

== See also ==
- Alternate spelling of Corson (demon)
- Gordon (surname)
- Lorson
- Morson
