= Dorson =

Dorson is both a surname and a given name. Notable people with the name include:

- Richard Dorson (1916–1981), American folklorist, writer, and academic
- Sharon Dorson (born 1994), Congolese handball player
- Dorson Boyce (born 1988), American football player

== See also ==
- Korson
- Morson
