= Backlund =

Backlund is a Swedish surname. Notable people with the surname include:

- Albert Victor Bäcklund (1845–1922), mathematician
- Bengt Backlund (1926–2006), Swedish flatwater canoer
- Bob Backlund (born 1949), American professional wrestler
- Filip Backlund (born 1990), Swedish motorcycle road racer
- Göran Backlund (born 1957), Swedish sprint canoer
- Gordon Backlund (born 1940), American politician and electrical engineer
- Gösta Backlund (1893–1918), Swedish footballer
- Gotthard Backlund, Swedish chess master
- Ivar Backlund (1892–1969), Swedish officer
- Johan Backlund (born 1981), Swedish ice hockey goaltender
- Jukka Backlund (born 1982), Finnish music producer
- Kaj Backlund (1945–2013), Finnish jazz trumpeter, composer, and bandleader
- Mikael Backlund (born 1989), Swedish ice hockey player
- Nils Backlund (1896–1964), Swedish water polo player
- Oskar Backlund (1846–1916), Swedish-Russian astronomer
- Sven Backlund (1917–1997), Swedish diplomat
- Victor L. Backlund (born 1936), American politician and athlete

== See also ==
- Bäcklund (surname)
