= Bobekov =

Bobekov is a Bulgarian surname. Notable people with the surname include:

- Radko Bobekov (1928–1993), Bulgarian chess master
- Stoyan Bobekov (born 1953), Bulgarian cyclist

== See also ==
- Bobkov
