= Lorson =

Lorson is a surname. Notable people with the surname include:

- Gerhard Lorson (1919–1992), German chess master
- Laura Lorson, American radio producer
- Mary Lorson, American singer-songwriter

== See also ==
- Larson (surname)
- Korson
- Morson
