= Gromek =

Gromek is a gender-neutral Slavic surname that may refer to

- Admiral Gromek, character from The Emissary (Star Trek: The Next Generation)
- Hermann Gromek, an East German security officer played by Wolfgang Kieling in Alfred Hitchcock's 1966 thriller, "Torn Curtain."
- Carl Gromek, Florida State Seminoles baseball pitcher
- Janusz Gromek (born 1956), Polish politician
- Joseph R. Gromek (born 1947), Warnaco Group CEO, Tumi Inc. Chairperson of Board of Directors
- Józef Gromek (1931–1985), Polish chess player
- L. Gromek, character from El ministerio del tiempo
- Lazlo Gromek, character from Knock on Wood (film)
- Ryszard Gromek, Czerwono-Czarni drummer
- Steve Gromek (1920–2002), American baseball pitcher
- Wiktor Gromek (born 2005), Polish Leicester City F.C. footballer
