= 13th Chess Olympiad =

1958 chess tournament in Munich, West Germany

The official poster of the Olympiad

The 13th Chess Olympiad (German: Die 13. Schacholympiade), organized by FIDE and comprising a team tournament, took place between September 30 and October 23, 1958, in Munich, then part of West Germany.

The Soviet team with 6 GMs, led by world champion Botvinnik, lived up to expectations and won their fourth gold medals in a row, with Yugoslavia and Argentina taking the silver and bronze, respectively. The West German hosts finished 7th, right behind rivals East Germany. The two neighbouring nations were tied on both game and match points, but the East Germans had won the match between the two.

== Results ==
=== Preliminaries ===
A total of 36 teams entered the competition and were divided into four preliminary groups of nine teams each. The top three from each group advanced to Final A, the teams placed 4th–6th to Final B, and no. 7–9 to Final C. All groups and finals were played as round-robin tournaments.

Group 1 was won by the Soviet hosts, well ahead of Bulgaria and Austria. The Netherlands, Denmark, and France took the places 4–6, while Italy, Puerto Rico, and Ireland finished at the bottom of the group.

Spain caused a small surprise by taking first place in group 2, ahead of the returning US team and the host nation. Finland, Iceland, and Israel made up the middle part of the group, while Norway, South Africa, and Iran had to settle for the bottom.

Group 3 was won by Argentina, ahead of East Germany and England. Traditional chess power Hungary surprisingly had to settle for Final B, along with Poland and Colombia. Meanwhile, The Philippines, Scotland, and Lebanon finished at the bottom of the group.

Czechoslovakia clinched group 4, ahead of Yugoslavia and Switzerland. Canada, Sweden, and Belgium made up the middle part of the group, while Portugal, Tunisia, and Greece completed the field.

- Group 1:

Final	Country	1	2	3	4	5	6	7	8	9	+	−	=	Points
«A»	Soviet Union	-	3½	2½	2½	3	4	4	3½	4	8	0	0	27
«A»	Bulgaria	½	-	3	1½	2	4	3½	3½	3½	5	2	1	21½
«A»	Austria	1½	1	-	2	2½	2½	4	3½	4	5	2	1	21
«B»	Netherlands	1½	2½	2	-	1½	3	3	3	4	5	2	1	20½
«B»	Denmark	1	2	1½	2½	-	1½	1½	2½	4	3	4	1	16½
«B»	France	0	0	1½	1	2½	-	2	3½	4	3	4	1	14½
«C»	Italy	0	½	0	1	2½	2	-	3½	1½	2	5	1	11
«C»	Puerto Rico	½	½	½	1	1½	½	½	-	3	1	7	0	8
«C»	Ireland	0	½	0	0	0	0	2½	1	-	1	7	0	4

- Group 2:

Final	Country	1	2	3	4	5	6	7	8	9	+	−	=	Points
«A»	Spain	-	2	2½	3	2½	3	3½	3½	3½	7	0	1	23½
«A»	United States	2	-	1½	3½	3	3	3	3½	3½	6	1	1	23
«A»	West Germany	1½	2½	-	2	3	1½	4	4	3½	5	2	1	22
«B»	Finland	1	½	2	-	2	3	2½	1½	3	3	3	2	15½
«B»	Iceland	1½	1	1	2	-	2½	2	2	3½	2	3	3	15½
«B»	Israel	1	1	2½	1	1½	-	2	3	3	3	4	1	15
«C»	Norway	½	1	0	1½	2	2	-	2½	2	1	4	3	11½
«C»	South Africa	½	½	0	2½	2	1	1½	-	2½	5	2	1	10½
«C»	Iran	½	½	½	1	½	1	2	1½	-	0	7	1	7½

- Group 3:

Final	Country	1	2	3	4	5	6	7	8	9	+	−	=	Points
«A»	Argentina	-	2½	1½	2½	2	3	3½	4	4	6	1	1	23
«A»	East Germany	1½	-	3	2	2½	3	2½	2½	4	6	1	1	21
«A»	England	2½	1	-	1½	3	2	3	3	4	5	2	1	20
«B»	Hungary	1½	2	2½	-	2½	1	3½	3½	3	5	2	1	19½
«B»	Poland	2	1½	1	1½	-	2	3½	3½	4	3	3	2	19
«B»	Colombia	1	1	2	3	2	-	1½	2½	3½	3	3	2	16½
«C»	Philippines	½	1½	1	½	½	2½	-	2	4	2	5	1	12½
«C»	Scotland	0	1½	1	½	½	1½	2	-	3	1	6	1	10
«C»	Lebanon	0	0	0	1	0	½	0	1	-	0	8	0	2½

- Group 4:

Final	Country	1	2	3	4	5	6	7	8	9	+	−	=	Points
«A»	Czechoslovakia	-	2	3	2	2½	4	3½	4	4	6	0	2	25
«A»	Yugoslavia	2	-	2	4	2½	2½	3½	4	3½	6	0	2	24
«A»	Switzerland	1	2	-	1½	2½	4	3½	4	1½	4	3	1	20
«B»	Canada	2	0	2½	-	2½	3	2	3½	3½	5	1	2	19
«B»	Sweden	1½	1½	1½	1½	-	3½	4	2	3	3	4	1	18½
«B»	Belgium	0	1½	0	1	½	-	2½	2½	2½	3	5	0	10½
«C»	Portugal	½	½	½	2	0	1½	-	2	3	1	5	2	10
«C»	Tunisia	0	0	0	½	2	1½	2	-	3½	1	5	2	9½
«C»	Greece	0	½	2½	½	1	1½	1	½	-	1	7	0	7½

=== Final ===
Final A
#	Country	Players	Points	MP	HTH
1	Soviet Union	Botvinnik, Smyslov, Keres, Bronstein, Tal, Petrosian	34½		
2	Yugoslavia	Gligorić, Matanović, Ivkov, Trifunović, Đurašević, Fuderer	29		
3	Argentina	Pilnik, Panno, Eliskases, Redolfi, Sanguineti, Emma	25½		
4	United States	Reshevsky, Lombardy, Bisguier, Evans, Rossolimo	24		
5	Czechoslovakia	Pachman, Filip, Fichtl, Kozma, Rejfíř, Šefc	22	12	
6	East Germany	Uhlmann, Malich, Dittmann, Bertholdt, Fuchs, Pietzsch	22	11	3½
7	West Germany	Unzicker, Tröger, Schmid, Darga, Pfeiffer, Lehmann	22	11	½
8	Switzerland	Kupper, Blau, Keller, Walther, Nievergelt, Bhend	19		
9	Spain	Pomar, Pérez, Torán Albero, Farre, Albareda, Lladó Lumbera	17½		
10	Bulgaria	Neikirch, Bobotsov, Minev, Milev, Tringov, Padevsky	17		
11	England	Alexander, Penrose, Golombek, Clarke, Wade	16		
12	Austria	Dückstein, Prameshuber, Stöckl, Beni, Lokvenc	15½		

Final B
#	Country	Players	Points	MP
13	Hungary	Szabó, Barcza, Portisch, Bilek, Honfi, Forintos	31	
14	Netherlands	Euwe, Donner, Prins, van den Berg, Kramer, Roessel	28	
15	Canada	Yanofsky, Anderson, Vaitonis, Füster, Joyner, Siemms	24½	17
16	Colombia	Cuéllar, Sánchez, de Greiff, Martín	24½	13
17	Israel	Porat, Czerniak, Aloni, Smiltiner, Pilshchik, Kraidman	23½	
18	Denmark	Larsen, Andersen, Enevoldsen J., Pedersen, Ravn, Enevoldsen H.	23	
19	Poland	Śliwa, Tarnowski, Szukszta, Witkowski, Kostro, Brzózka	22½	
20	Sweden	Ståhlberg, Johansson, Sterner, Nilsson, Arnlind, Hörberg	21	
21	Finland	Ojanen, Böök, Rantanen, Fred, Koskinen, Hällström	19	
22	Iceland	Jóhannsson, Pálmason, Thorbergsson, Jónsson, Guðmundsson, Kristjánsson	18	
23	France	Raizman, Boutteville, Bergraser, Lemoine, Catozzi, Noradounguian	15	
24	Belgium	Dunkelblum, Franck, Van Schoor, Van den Broeck, Beyen, Weltjens	13½	

Final C
#	Country	Players	Points	MP	HTH
25	Norway	Rojahn, Vestøl, Ofstad, Bøckman, Lindblom, Halvorsen	30		
26	Philippines	Cardoso, Campomanes, Borja, Aldecoa	29½		
27	South Africa	Heidenfeld, Dreyer, Kirby, Grivainis, Isaacson, Stern	28		
28	Italy	Primavera, Romani, Norcia, Palmiotto, Laco, Contedini	26½		
29	Scotland	Fairhurst, Aitken, Macleod, Perkins, Beckingham E., Thomson	25½		
30	Greece	Syngellakis, Angos, Panagopoulos, Sakellaropoulos, Anastasopoulos, Zografakis	25		
31	Portugal	Durão, Oliveira, Ribeiro, Gonçalves, Pereira, Cardoso	23		
32	Iran	Safvat, Mashian, Pakdaman, Lotfy, Navabi, Assar	20		
33	Puerto Rico	Cintrón, Benítez, Reissmann, Llavandero, Azúar, Vissepó	14½	4	2½
34	Ireland	Walsh, Reilly, Canton B., Loughrey, Russell A., Reid	14½	4	1½
35	Tunisia	Lagha, Harrouchi, Kchouk, Ennigrou, Mohsen	14		
36	Lebanon	Chalabi, Gabriel, Tarazi, Allam, Succar	13½		

Final A

No.	Country	1	2	3	4	5	6	7	8	9	10	11	12	+	−	=	Points
1	Soviet Union	-	2	2	2	3½	4	2½	3½	3½	3½	4	4	8	0	3	34½
2	Yugoslavia	2	-	2½	2½	3	3½	2½	3½	2½	2½	2½	2	9	0	2	29
3	Argentina	2	1½	-	2	2	3	3	2½	3	2	2½	2	5	1	5	25½
4	United States	2	1½	2	-	2	2	2½	2½	2½	2	3	2	4	1	6	24
5	Czechoslovakia	½	1	2	2	-	2½	1½	3	2	2½	3	2	4	3	4	22
6	East Germany	0	½	1	2	1½	-	3½	2½	1½	3	2½	4	5	5	1	22
7	West Germany	1½	1½	1	1½	2½	½	-	3	3½	2	2½	2½	5	5	1	22
8	Switzerland	½	½	1½	1½	1	1½	1	-	3	2½	2½	3½	4	7	0	19
9	Spain	½	1½	1	1½	2	2½	½	1	-	2	2½	2½	3	6	2	17½
10	Bulgaria	½	1½	2	2	1½	1	2	1½	2	-	1½	1½	0	7	4	17
11	England	0	1½	1½	1	1	1½	1½	1½	1½	2½	-	2½	2	9	0	16
12	Austria	0	2	2	2	2	0	1½	½	1½	2½	1½	-	1	6	4	15½

Final B

No.	Country	1	2	3	4	5	6	7	8	9	10	11	12	+	−	=	Points
13	Hungary	-	3½	1½	2	2	3	3½	2½	2½	2½	4	4	8	1	2	31
14	Netherlands	½	-	3½	2½	2½	2½	3	2	3	3	2½	3½	9	1	1	28½
15	Canada	2½	½	-	1	2	2½	2½	2½	2½	2½	3½	2½	8	2	1	24½
16	Colombia	2	1½	3	-	3	1	2	1½	2	3½	2½	2½	5	3	3	24½
17	Israel	2	1½	2	1	-	3½	1½	1½	2½	2½	2½	3	5	4	2	23½
18	Denmark	1	1½	1½	3	½	-	1½	2	4	2½	2	3½	4	5	2	23
19	Poland	½	1	1½	2	2½	2½	-	3	1½	2	3	3	5	4	2	22½
20	Sweden	1½	2	1½	2½	2½	2	1	-	2½	2	1½	2	3	4	4	21
21	Finland	1½	1	1½	2	1½	0	2½	1½	-	3	2	2½	3	6	2	19
22	Iceland	1½	1	1½	½	1½	1½	2	2	1	-	3	2½	2	7	2	18
23	France	0	1½	½	1½	1½	2	1	2½	2	1	-	1½	1	8	2	15
24	Belgium	0	½	1½	1½	1	½	1	2	1½	1½	2½	-	1	9	1	13½

Final C

No.	Country	1	2	3	4	5	6	7	8	9	10	11	12	+	−	=	Points
25	Norway	-	1½	2	3	3	3	2½	2	3	2½	4	3½	8	1	2	30
26	Philippines	2½	-	2	2	3	2	3	2	4	3½	3	2½	7	0	4	29½
27	South Africa	2	2	-	2	2	2	3	2½	2½	4	3½	2½	6	0	5	28
28	Italy	1	2	2	-	2½	1½	1½	3	3	2½	4	3½	6	3	2	26½
29	Scotland	1	1	2	1½	-	2	2½	2½	3½	4	2	3½	5	3	3	25½
30	Greece	1	2	2	2½	2	-	2½	2½	2½	2	3	3	6	1	4	25
31	Portugal	1½	1	1	2½	1½	1½	-	2½	2	2½	3½	3½	5	5	1	23
32	Iran	2	2	1½	1	1½	1½	1½	-	3	1	3	2	2	6	3	20
33	Puerto Rico	1	0	1½	1	½	1½	2	1	-	2½	1½	2	1	8	2	14½
34	Ireland	1½	½	0	1½	0	2	1½	3	1½	-	1	2	1	8	2	14½
35	Tunisia	0	1	½	0	2	1	½	1	2½	3	-	2½	3	7	1	14
36	Lebanon	½	1½	1½	½	½	1	½	2	2	2	1½	-	0	8	3	13½

=== Individual medals ===
- Board 1: (Socialist Federal Republic of Yugoslavia) Svetozar Gligorić 12 / 15 = 80.0%
- Board 2: (Canada) Frank Anderson 10½ / 13 = 80.8%
- Board 3: (Soviet Union) Paul Keres 9½ / 12 = 79.2%
- Board 4: (Soviet Union) David Bronstein 9½ / 12 = 79.2%
- 1st reserve: (Soviet Union) Mikhail Tal 13½ / 15 = 90.0%
- 2nd reserve: (Soviet Union) Tigran Petrosian and (Hungary) Győző Forintos 10½ / 13 = 80.8%
