= Katajisto =

Katajisto is a Finnish surname, which may refer to:

- Janne Katajisto (born 1978), Finnish former professional boxer
- Kalle Katajisto (born 1991), Finnish motorcycle speedway rider
- Martti Katajisto (1926–2000), Finnish actor
- Olavi Katajisto (1916-unknown), Finnish chess player
- Tero Katajisto (born 1971), Finnish wrestler
