= Janusz Szukszta =

Polish chess player

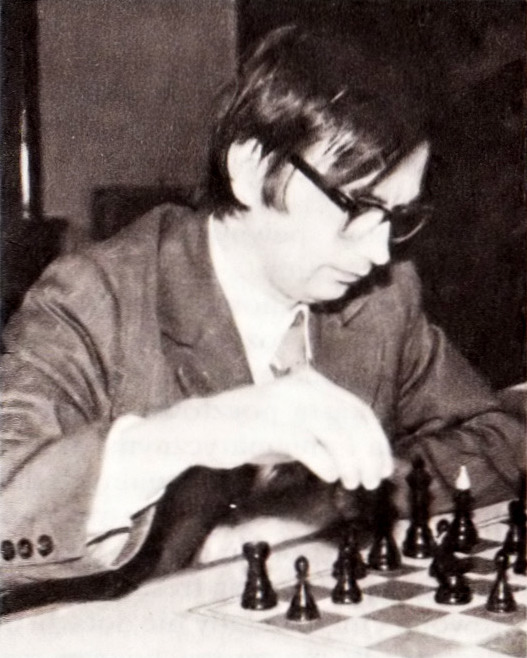

Personal information
- Born: 25 June 1932 (age 94) Warsaw, Poland

Chess career
- Country: Poland

Janusz Szukszta (25 June 1932 – 6 September 2025) was a Polish chess player.

== Chess career ==
In 1950, in Iwonicz-Zdrój Janusz Szukszta won Polish Junior Chess Championship, ahead Stefan Witkowski and Romuald Grabczewski. From 1952 to 1975 he seven times participated in Polish Chess Championships final. His best result - twice ranked in 4th place (1956, 1957). Janusz Szukszta nine time won Polish Team Chess Championship (1952, 1959, 1960, 1961, 1963, 1964, 1967, 1969, 1972) and two time won Polish Team Fast Chess Championship (1967, 1975). In 1974, Janusz Szukszta shared 1st place in International Chess Tournament in Augustów, but in 1979 he won International Chess Tournament in Algiers. In 1979, Janusz Szukszta shared 1st place in International Chess Tournament in Mecheri.

Janusz Szukszta played for Poland in the Chess Olympiad:

- In 1958, at third board in the 13th Chess Olympiad in Munich (+3, =5, -2).

Janusz Szukszta played for Poland in the European Team Chess Championship preliminaries:

- In 1961, at seventh board in the 2nd European Team Chess Championship preliminaries (+0, =3, -2).

Janusz Szukszta played for Poland in the World Student Team Chess Championship:

- In 1956, at fourth board in the 3rd World Student Team Chess Championship in Uppsala (+3, =2, -0).
