= Nievergelt =

Nievergelt is a Swiss surname. It may refer to the following:

- Ernst Nievergelt (1910–1999), Swiss cyclist
- Erwin Nievergelt (1929–2019), Swiss chess player
