= Axel Nielsen (chess player) =

Danish chess player

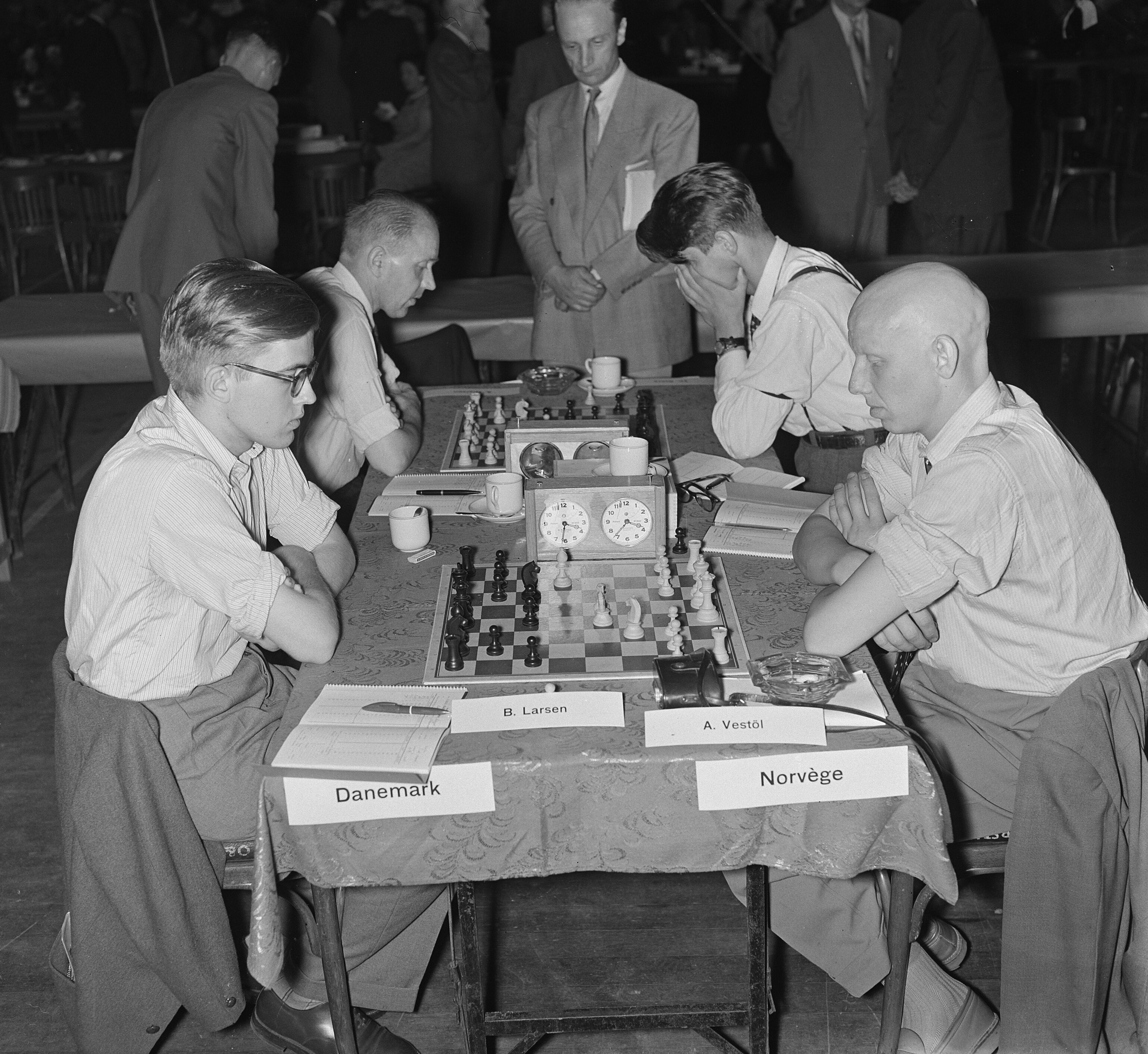
- 11th Chess Olympiad, 1954. Back row probably Axel Nielsen vs. Otto Birger Morcken

Personal information
- Born: 9 January 1914
- Died: 16 September 2004 (aged 90)

Chess career
- Country: Denmark

Axel Kristian Nielsen (9 January 1914 – 16 September 2004), was a Danish chess player, and six-times Danish Chess Championship medalist (1944, 1946, 1948, 1954, 1955, 1959).

== Biography ==
From the end to 1940s to the early 1960s Axel Nielsen was one of the strongest Danish chess players. In Danish Chess Championships he won 3 silver (1946, 1954, 1955) and 3 bronze (1944, 1948, 1959) medals.

Axel Nielsen played for Denmark in the Chess Olympiads:

- In 1954, at second board in the 11th Chess Olympiad in Amsterdam (+4, =5, -5),
- In 1956, at first reserve board in the 12th Chess Olympiad in Moscow (+2, =1, -4),
- In 1960, at first board in the 14th Chess Olympiad in Leipzig (+4, =4, -6).
