= Ljungkvist =

Ljungkvist is a Swedish surname. Notable people with the surname include:

- Daniel Ljungkvist (born 1981), Swedish ice hockey player
- Fredrik Ljungkvist (born 1969), Swedish jazz musician

== See also ==
- Ljungqvist
