= Enevoldsen =

Enevoldsen is a surname. Notable people with the surname include:

- Bob Enevoldsen (1920–2005), American jazz saxophonist
- Harald Enevoldsen (1911–2005), Danish chess master
- Fernando Enevoldsen (born 1965), Argentine skier
- Jens Enevoldsen (1907–1980), Danish chess master
- Thomas Enevoldsen (born 1987), Danish footballer
