= Kchouk =

Kchouk is an Arabic surname. Notable people with the surname include:

- Bechir Kchouk (1924–1983), Tunisian chess master
- Sliman Kchouk (born 1994), Tunisian footballer
