= Sieghart Dittmann =

German chess player

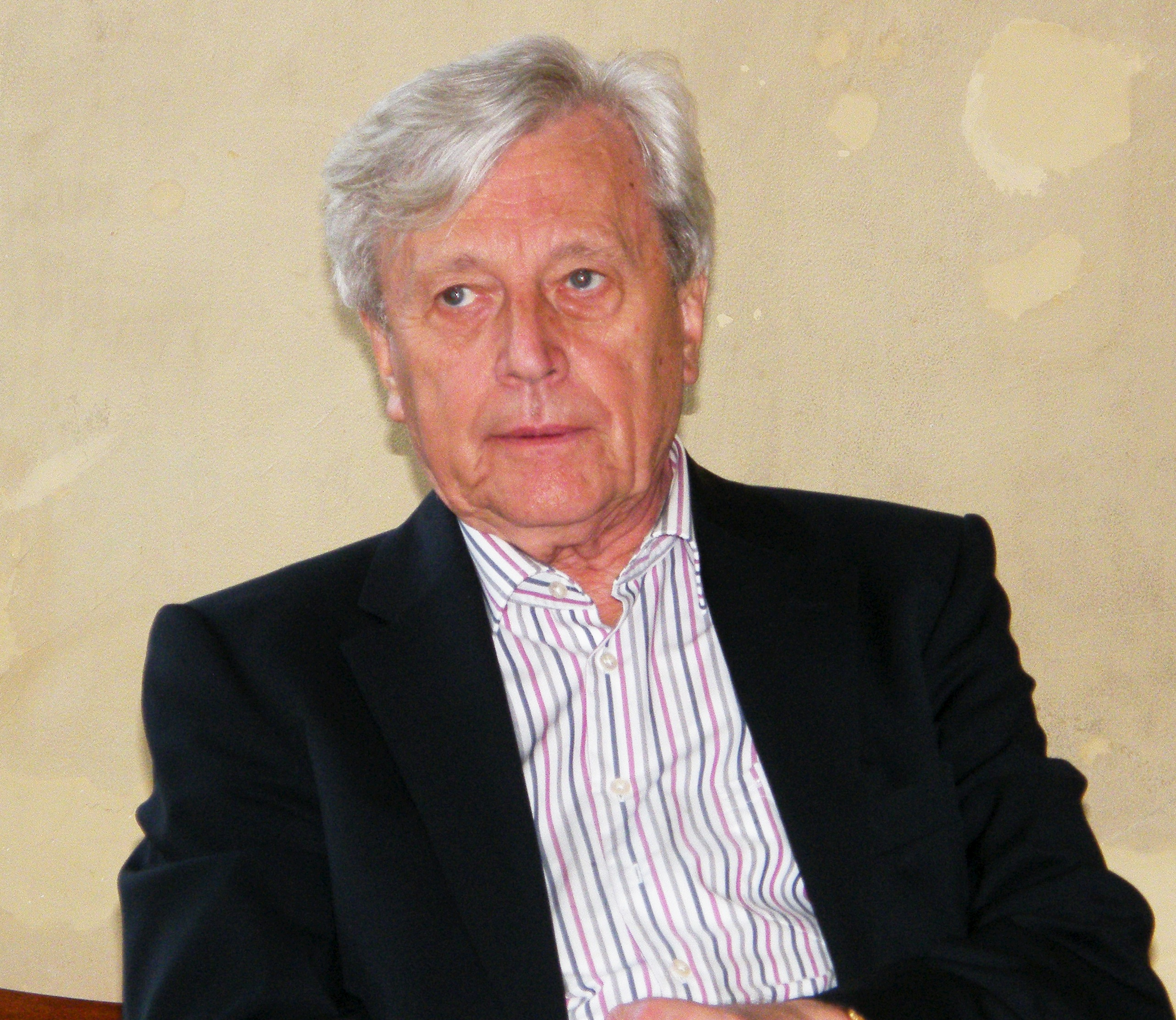
- Sieghart Dittmann in 2012

Personal information
- Born: 3 July 1934 (age 92) Eibenstock, Germany

Chess career
- Country: Germany

Sieghart Dittmann (born 3 July 1934) is a German chess player and epidemiologist.

== Biography ==
Sieghart Dittmann grew up in Chemnitz and Kirchberg. He went to the Leipzig University to study medicine. Sieghart Dittmann did his doctorate on Tuberculosis. In 1979 he was habilitated with the topic "vaccine complications". In 1982 Sieghart Dittmann received the Rudolf Virchow Prize, a state award from the German Democratic Republic (GDR). From 1983 he was a lecturer and professor of hygiene and epidemiology at the Hygiene Institute of Berlin Charité. From 1985 to 1990 Sieghart Dittmann was director of the Central Institute for Hygiene, Microbiology and Epidemiology in East Berlin. From 1992 he worked for the Robert Koch Institute, from 2001 to 2004 as Vice Chairman of the Standing Committee on Vaccination. Sieghart Dittmann also led the Division of Infectious Diseases and Vaccination Programs of the World Health Organization Regional Office for Europe. Sieghart Dittmann has over 300 publications to show. He was co-editor and author of the encyclopedia Meyler’s Side Effect of Drugs.

At the age of ten Sieghart Dittmann learned to play chess in school. In improving his playing ability, he was helped Kleine Lehrbuch des Schachspiels by Jean Dufresne. Sieghart Dittmann was only active in the 1950s to 1960s as a chess player. In 1954 he won in Schkopau the East Germany Youth Chess Championship in U20 group. In 1956 he won the International Christmas Chess Tournament in Vienna in front of the Yugoslav grandmaster Vasja Pirc and the Austrian Andreas Dückstein. In 1960 he worked as a general practitioner in St. Georg Hospital in Leipzig. Although his profession took him heavily, he was at times behind Wolfgang Uhlmann as the number two in the East Germany chess. However, he decided to focus on medicine. His chess club was the SC Rotation Leipzig.

Sieghart Dittmann played for East Germany in the Chess Olympiads:

- In 1956, at second board in the 12th Chess Olympiad in Moscow (+3, =5, -6),
- In 1958, at third board in the 13th Chess Olympiad in Munich (+6, =7, -2),
- In 1960, at fourth board in the 14th Chess Olympiad in Leipzig (+2, =8, -2).

Sieghart Dittmann played for East Germany in the European Team Chess Championship preliminaries:

- In 1961, at sixth board in the 2nd European Team Chess Championship in Oberhausen (+3, =3, -0).

Sieghart Dittmann played for East Germany in the World Student Team Chess Championships:

- In 1957, at first board in the 4th World Student Team Chess Championship in Reykjavík (+4, =5, -4),
- In 1959, at first board in the 6th World Student Team Chess Championship in Budapest (+1, =5, -3).
