= Anagnostou =

Anagnostou (Greek: Αναγνώστου) is a patronymic, occupational Greek family name derived from the Greek word αναγνώστης (anagnóstis, "reader"). Since Byzantine times an anagnost was responsible for reading religious texts at a liturgy. Notable people with this name include:

- Chrissovalantis Anagnostou (born 1975), German-Greek football player
- Fani Anagnostou, French-Greek dentist and researcher
- Gerasimos Anagnostou (1880–?), Greek sports shooter
- Ioanna Boukouvala-Anagnostou (1904–1992), Greek writer
- Ioannis Anagnostou, Greek chess master
- Sabine Anagnostou, German medical historian and pharmacist
- Sergio Pérez Anagnostou (born 1979), Spanish basketball player

== Television ==
- Hector Anagnostou, fictional character on the ANT1 television series Erotas
- Myrtle Anagnostou, fictional character on the ANT1 television series Erotas
