= Carlos Jáuregui =

Carlos Jáuregui may refer to:

- Carlos Jáuregui (activist) (1957–1996), Argentine LGBT-rights activist
- Carlos Jáuregui (chess player) (1932–2013), Chilean–Canadian chess master
