= 11th Chess Olympiad =

1954 chess tournament in Amsterdam, Netherlands

The official logo of the Olympiad

The 11th Chess Olympiad (Dutch: De 11e Schaakolympiade), organized by the FIDE and comprising a team tournament, took place between September 4 and September 25, 1954, in Amsterdam, Netherlands.

30 teams had applied, but only 26 took part. The most notable absentees were the United States, who could not afford the travelling expenses due to financial difficulties in the USCF.

The Soviet team once again won the event, followed by Argentina and Yugoslavia. Unlike the previous Olympiad, however, they dominated this one completely and crushed all opposition, winning the final by an astounding seven points. Keres' amazing score of 96.4% was an all-time record; he drew his first game (against Nilsson of Sweden) and won the rest.

== Results ==
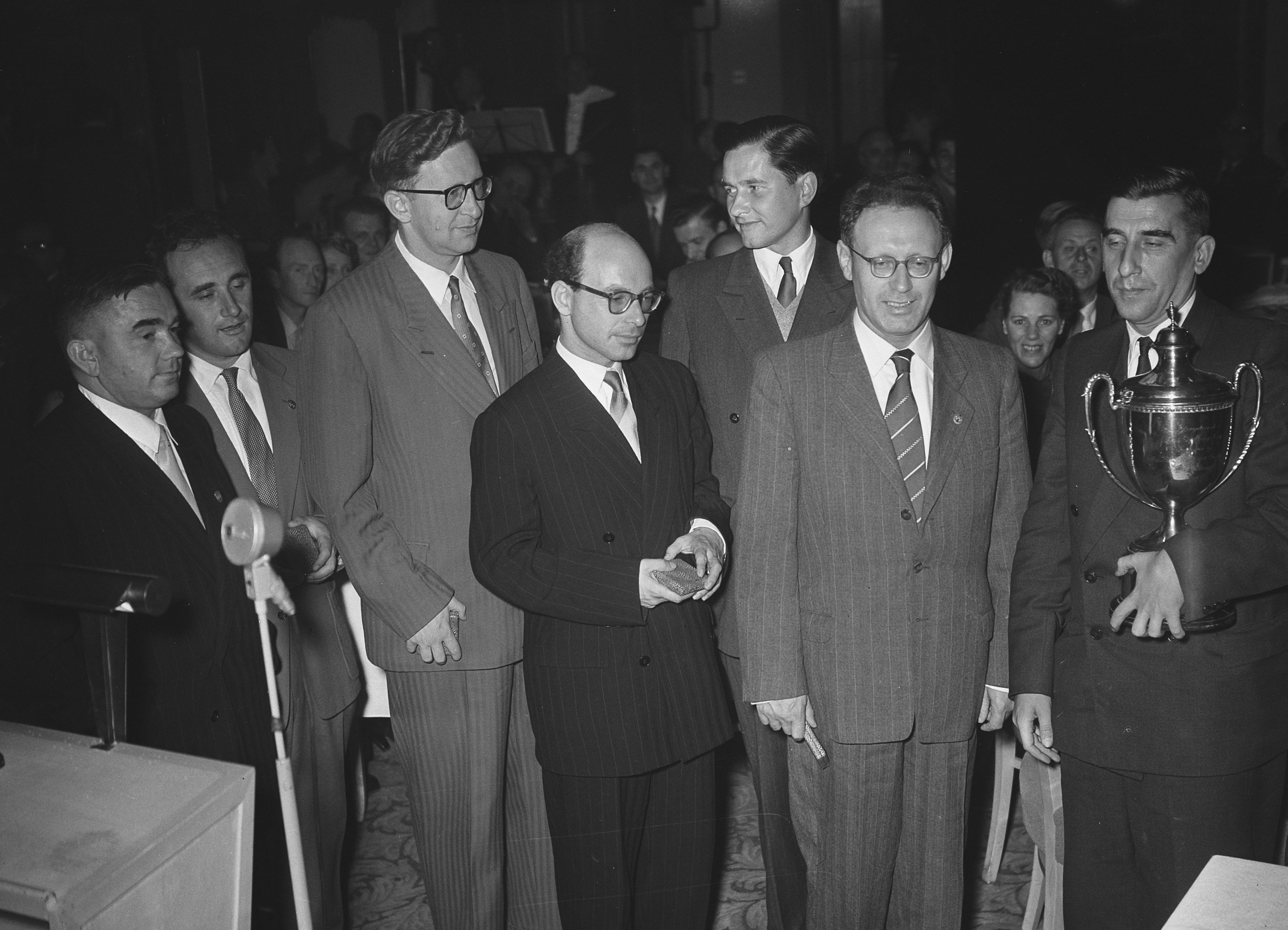
Award ceremony at the 1954 Chess Olympiad. Left-right: Kotov, Geller, Smyslov, Bronstein, Keres, Botvinnik, and Bondarevsky (carrying the Hamilton-Russell Cup)

=== Preliminaries ===
A total of 26 teams entered the competition and were divided into four preliminary groups of six or seven teams. The top three from each group advanced to Final A, and the rest to Final B. All groups and finals were played as round-robin tournaments.

Group 1 was won by the Soviet Union, well ahead of the Dutch hosts and Iceland. Austria, Finland, and Greece finished in the bottom half.

Argentina took first place in group 2, ahead of Bulgaria and Czechoslovakia. Canada, Italy, and Ireland made up the rest of the group.

Group 3 was won by Israel, ahead of Yugoslavia and Sweden. Denmark, Norway, France, and Saar had to settle for a place in the consolation final.

Hungary clinched group 4, ahead of West Germany and England. Switzerland, Colombia, Belgium, and Luxembourg rounded up the group.

Group 1

Final	Country	1	2	3	4	5	6	+	−	=	Points
«A»	Soviet Union	-	2	3½	3	4	4	4	0	1	16½
«A»	Netherlands	2	-	2½	3	3	2½	4	0	1	13
«A»	Iceland	½	1½	-	3	3½	2½	3	2	0	11
«B»	Austria	1	1	1	-	3	3½	2	3	0	9½
«B»	Finland	0	1	½	1	-	3	1	4	0	5½
«B»	Greece	0	1½	1½	½	1	-	0	5	0	4½

Group 2

Final	Country	1	2	3	4	5	6	+	−	=	Points
«A»	Argentina	-	2	2	3	3	4	3	0	2	14
«A»	Bulgaria	2	-	2	2½	3½	3½	3	0	2	13½
«A»	Czechoslovakia	2	2	-	2½	3	4	3	0	2	13½
«B»	Canada	1	1½	1½	-	2½	3½	2	3	0	10
«B»	Italy	1	½	1	1½	-	3½	1	4	0	7½
«B»	Ireland	0	½	0	½	½	-	0	5	0	1½

Group 3

Final	Country	1	2	3	4	5	6	7	+	−	=	Points
«A»	Israel	-	1½	3	2½	3	3	3	5	1	0	16
«A»	Yugoslavia	2½	-	2	3	2½	2½	1½	4	1	1	14
«A»	Sweden	1	2	-	2	2½	2½	4	3	1	2	14
«B»	Denmark	1½	1	2	-	1½	3½	2	1	3	2	11½
«B»	Norway	1	1½	1½	2½	-	2	2½	2	3	1	11
«B»	France	1	1½	1½	½	2	-	3	1	4	1	9½
«B»	Saar	1	2½	0	2	1½	1	-	1	4	1	8

Group 4

Final	Country	1	2	3	4	5	6	7	+	−	=	Points
«A»	Hungary	-	2½	1½	3	4	3	4	5	1	0	18
«A»	West Germany	1½	-	2½	3	2	3½	4	4	1	1	16½
«A»	England	2½	1½	-	2½	1½	1½	4	3	3	0	13½
«B»	Switzerland	1	1	1½	-	2½	3½	4	3	3	0	13½
«B»	Colombia	0	2	2½	1½	-	2½	4	3	2	1	12½
«B»	Belgium	1	½	2½	½	1½	-	3	2	4	0	9
«B»	Luxembourg	0	0	0	0	0	1	-	0	6	0	1

=== Final ===
Final A
#	Country	Players	Points	MP
1	Soviet Union	Botvinnik, Smyslov, Bronstein, Keres, Geller, Kotov	34	
2	Argentina	Najdorf, J. Bolbochán, Panno, Guimard, Rossetto, Pilnik	27	
3	Yugoslavia	Pirc, Gligorić, Trifunović, Rabar, Fuderer, Matanović	26½	
4	Czechoslovakia	Pachman, Filip, Zíta, Šajtar, Fichtl, Ujtelky	24½	
5	West Germany	Unzicker, Schmid, Pfeiffer, Rellstab, Darga, Joppen	23½	
6	Hungary	Szabó, Kluger, Barcza, Sándor, Gereben	23	
7	Israel	Porath, Czerniak, Oren, Aloni, Kniazer	22	
8	Netherlands	Euwe, Donner, Cortlever, Prins, Kramer, Van Scheltinga	21	
9	England	Alexander, Penrose, Golombek, Wade, Barden, Clarke	17	7
10	Bulgaria	Minev, Neikirch, Milev, Tsvetkov, Bobotsov, Bobekov	17	6
11	Sweden	Ståhlberg, Lundin, Stoltz, Hörberg, Nilsson, Goode	15	
12	Iceland	Friðrik Ólafsson, Guðmundur Guðmundsson, Guðmundur Pálmason, Guðmundur Ágústsson, Ingi Randver Jóhannsson, Guðmundur Arnlaugsson	13½	

Final B
#	Country	Players	Points	MP	Head-to-head
13	Switzerland	Kupper, Blau, Nievergelt, Bhend, Zimmermann, Walther	37		
14	Canada	Yanofsky, Anderson, Vaitonis, Bohatyrchuk, Fox, Divinsky	36	21	3
15	Austria	Robatsch, Beni, Prameshuber, Lokvenc, Kovács	36	21	1
16	Denmark	Larsen, Nielsen A., Nielsen P., Nielsen V., Enevoldsen, Andersen B.	34½		
17	Italy	Paoli, Porreca, Norcia, Scafarelli, Calà	28½		
18	Colombia	Cuéllar, de Greiff, Sánchez, Rivera, Tejada H., Hernández G.	27½		
19	Belgium	O'Kelly, Dunkelblum, Gobert, Lemaire, Franck, Thibaut	27		
20	Finland	Salo, Vesterinen, Katajisto, Fred, Rantanen	26½		
21	France	Bernstein, Raizman, Thiellement, Bergraser, Noradounguian, Burstein	26		
22	Saar	Benkner, Lorson, Morena, Kastel, Weichselbaumer, Haas	24		
23	Norway	Morcken, Vestøl, Lindblom, Støre, Flater, Ramm	22		
24	Greece	Parliaros, Anagnostou, Panagopoulos, Papapavlou	21		
25	Ireland	Reilly, Kelly, Maher, Walsh, Nash, Rohan	11		
26	Luxembourg	Doerner, Neu, Philippe, Schneider, Kremer, Jerolim J.	7		

=== Final A ===
Place	Country	1	2	3	4	5	6	7	8	9	10	11	12	+	−	=	Points
1	Soviet Union	-	3½	2½	2½	3	3	2	3½	3½	3	3½	4	10	0	1	34
2	Argentina	½	-	1½	3	2½	2	3	2½	3	2½	3	3½	8	2	1	27
3	Yugoslavia	1½	2½	-	2	2½	1½	3	3	3½	2	2½	2½	7	2	2	26½
4	Czechoslovakia	1½	1	2	-	3	2	1½	2	3	2½	3½	2½	5	3	3	24½
5	West Germany	1	1½	1½	1	-	2	2½	½	2½	4	4	3	5	5	1	23½
6	Hungary	1	2	2½	2	2	-	1	3	2	2	2	3½	3	2	6	23
7	Israel	2	1	1	2½	1½	3	-	3	½	3	2	2½	5	4	2	22
8	Netherlands	½	1½	1	2	3½	1	1	-	3	2½	3	2	4	5	2	21
9	England	½	1	½	1	1½	2	3½	1	-	2½	1	2½	3	7	1	17
10	Bulgaria	1	1½	2	1½	0	2	1	1½	1½	-	2½	2½	2	7	2	17
11	Sweden	½	1	1½	½	0	2	2	1	3	1½	-	2	1	7	3	15
12	Iceland	0	½	1½	1½	1	½	1½	2	1½	1½	2	-	0	9	2	13½

=== Final B ===
Place	Country	13	14	15	16	17	18	19	20	21	22	23	24	25	26	+	−	=	Points
13	Switzerland	-	3	3	2	3	3½	2½	2½	3	2½	4	1	3½	3½	11	1	1	37
14	Canada	1	-	3	2	3	3½	2	2½	3½	3	3½	2	3	4	9	1	3	36
15	Austria	1	1	-	3	3	3	2	3	2½	3	3	3½	4	4	10	2	1	36
16	Denmark	2	2	1	-	2	1½	3	3½	3	2	3½	3½	4	3½	7	2	4	34½
17	Italy	1	1	1	2	-	2	3	1½	1	2	3½	3½	4	3	5	5	3	28½
18	Colombia	½	½	1	2½	2	-	2	2½	1	3½	3	2½	2½	4	7	4	2	27½
19	Belgium	1½	2	2	1	1	2	-	1½	3	2½	2	2	2½	4	4	4	5	27
20	Finland	1½	1½	1	½	2½	1½	2½	-	2½	2	2½	1½	4	3	6	6	1	26½
21	France	1	½	1½	1	3	3	1	1½	-	3	1½	3	2½	3½	6	7	0	26
22	Saar	1½	1	1	2	2	½	1½	2	1	-	1	2½	4	4	3	7	3	24
23	Norway	0	½	1	½	½	1	2	1½	2½	3	-	2½	4	3	5	7	1	22
24	Greece	3	2	½	½	½	1½	2	2½	1	1½	1½	-	1½	3	3	8	2	21
25	Ireland	½	1	0	0	0	1½	1½	0	1½	0	0	2½	-	2½	2	11	0	11
26	Luxembourg	½	0	0	½	1	0	0	1	½	0	1	1	1½	-	0	13	0	7

=== Individual medals ===
- Board 1: (Soviet Union) Mikhail Botvinnik 8½ / 11 = 77.3%
- Board 2: (Canada) Frank Anderson 14 / 17 = 82.4%
- Board 3: (Hungary) Gedeon Barcza 12½ / 16 = 78.1%
- Board 4: (Soviet Union) Paul Keres 13½ / 14 = 96.4%
- 1st reserve: (Soviet Union) Efim Geller 5 / 7 = 71.4%
- 2nd reserve: (France) Sylvain Burstein 8½ / 11 = 77.3%
