= Vesterinen =

Vesterinen is a Finnish surname. Notable people with the surname include:

- Jorma Vesterinen (1918–unknown), Finnish chess master
- Paavo Vesterinen (1918–1993), Finnish farmer and politician
- Vihtori Vesterinen (1885–1958), Finnish farmer and politician
- Viljo Vesterinen (1907–1961), Finnish accordionist and composer
