= Knut Bøckman =

Norwegian chess player

Personal information
- Born: 24 April 1932 Tromsø, Norway
- Died: 2 July 2008 (aged 76)

Chess career
- Country: Norway

Knut Bøckman (24 April 1932 – 2 July 2008) was a Norwegian chess player and journalist.

== Biography ==
In the 1950s Knut Bøckman was one of the leading Norwegian chess players. Latest he was chairman of Oslo chess club Oslo Schakselskap for 19 years.

Knut Bøckman played for Norway in the Chess Olympiad:

- In 1958, at fourth board in the 13th Chess Olympiad in Munich (+5, =5, -4).

Knut Bøckman played for Norway in the World Student Team Chess Championships:

- In 1954, at fourth board in the 1st World Student Team Chess Championship in Oslo (+1, =5, -4),
- In 1956, at third board in the 3rd World Student Team Chess Championship in Uppsala (+2, =1, -4).

Knut Bøckman was a journalist by profession. He was political editor of Norwegian weekly newspaper Morgenbladet.
