= ICCF Denmark =

ICCF Denmark belongs to the ICCF national member federations.

== Creation of DSU ==
In 1903 several clubs in Jutland formed a chess federation, which was renamed Dansk Skak Union (Danish Chess Union) in 1905.

== Achievements ==
In 1980, Jorn Sloth became the 8th Correspondence Chess World Champion. European Champions: Jorn Sloth (8), Ove Ekebjaerg (10), Henrik Sorensen (13), Arne Sorensen (19), Bent Sorensen (20) and Sven Pedersen (21)

== Titled players ==
=== Grandmaster ===
- Erik Bang
- Ove Ekebjærg
- Niels Jørgen Fries Nielsen
- Curt Hansen
- Arne Bjørn Jørgensen
- Jan du Jardin
- Allan Astrup Jensen
- Martin Lohse
- Jens Hartung Nielsen
- Allan Poulsen
- Bent Sørensen
- Jørn Sloth

=== Senior International Master ===
- Erik Barfoed
- Anders Berggreen
- Lars Hyldkrog
- Svend Erik Kramer
- Ove Kroll
- Niels Lauritsen
- Henrik B. Pedersen
- Ove Søgaard
- Emil Christensen

=== International Master ===
- Svend Erik Andersen
- Nikolaj Borge
- Jan S. Christensen
- Tonny Christiansen
- Niels Danstrup
- Joe Flyckt-Olsen
- Jens Ove Fries Nielsen
- Jens Haagen Hansen
- Mads Smith Hansen
- Henrik Holmsgaard
- Aage Ingerslev
- Ib V. N. Jensen
- Vagn Jensen
- Klaus Høeck Johnsen
- Svend Kingsø
- Poul Kleiminger
- Claes Løfgren
- Jens Bak Larsen
- Hans Jørgen Lassen
- Torsten Lindestrøm
- Hans Chr. Lykke
- Christian Waagner Nielsen
- Mogens (Esbjerg) Nielsen
- Jens Otto Pedersen
- Sven Pedersen
- Søren Peschardt
- Viggo Bove Quist
- Aksel Ros
- Per Bille Sømod
- Arne Sørensen
- Henrik Sørensen
- Henrik Svane
- Hans Tanggaard
- Michael Tettinek
- Keld Thomsen
- Thomas Tronhjem
