= Khelil Lagha =

Tunisian chess player

Personal information
- Born: unknown

Chess career
- Country: Tunisia

Khelil Lagha (Arabic: خليل لاغا) is a Tunisian chess player.

== Chess career ==
From the end of 1950s to the begin of 1970s, Khelil Lagha was one of the leading Tunisian chess players. In 1964 Khelil Lagha played for Tunisia in team match against Belgium and won two games from two.

Khelil Lagha played for Tunisia in the Chess Olympiads:

- In 1958, at first board in the 13th Chess Olympiad in Munich (+1, =4, -12),
- In 1960, at second board in the 14th Chess Olympiad in Leipzig (+3, =9, -7),
- In 1962, at second board in the 15th Chess Olympiad in Varna (+3, =5, -5),
- In 1968, at fourth board in the 18th Chess Olympiad in Lugano (+4, =4, -4),
- In 1970, at second reserve board in the 19th Chess Olympiad in Siegen (+2, =3, -5),
- In 1972, at second reserve board in the 20th Chess Olympiad in Skopje (+5, =3, -2).

Khelil Lagha played for Tunisia in the European Team Chess Championship preliminaries:

- In 1973, at sixth board in the 5th European Team Chess Championship preliminaries (+0, =1, -1).
