= Heikki Koskinen =

Finnish chess player (born 1930)

Personal information
- Born: 30 August 1930 (age 95)

Chess career
- Country: Finland

Heikki Koskinen (born 30 August 1930) is a Finnish chess player, Finnish Chess Championship medalist (1958, 1959, 1961, 1967).

== Biography ==
From the mid-1950s to the begin of 1970s, Heikki Koskinen was one of Finland's leading chess players. In Finnish Chess Championships he has won four medals: two silver (1958, 1959) and two bronze (1961, 1967). In 1954, in Prague/Mariánské Lázně Heikki Koskinen participated in World Chess Championship Zonal tournament. In 1963, in Odense he participated in Nordic Chess Championship.

Heikki Koskinen played for Finland in the Chess Olympiads:

- In 1958, at first reserve board in the 13th Chess Olympiad in Munich (+2, =6, -2),
- In 1968, at fourth board in the 18th Chess Olympiad in Lugano (+3, =9, -2),
- In 1970, at fourth board in the 19th Chess Olympiad in Siegen (+5, =5, -2).

Heikki Koskinen played for Finland in the European Team Chess Championship preliminaries:

- In 1961, at fourth board in the 2nd European Team Chess Championship preliminaries (+0, =4, -0).
