= Knud Mohr =

Danish philatelist

Knud Mohr (2 April 1935 – 31 July 2016) was a Danish philatelist who signed the Roll of Distinguished Philatelists in Edinburgh in 1993. He was President of the Fédération Internationale de Philatélie from 1998 to 2002 and an Editor (later Honorary Editor) of Fakes Forgeries Experts from 2004 to 2013.
