= Jaroslav Šajtar =

Czech chess player

- Country: Czech Republic
- Born: December 3, 1921; Ostrava, Czechoslovakia
- Died: February 4, 2003 (aged 81)
- Title: Honorary Grandmaster (1985); International Master (1950)

Jaroslav Šajtar (December 3, 1921 – February 4, 2003) was a Czech chess master and an honorary grandmaster, born in Ostrava.

He won at Kraków 1938, thrice placed joined 4th at Choceň 1942, Prague 1943 (Alexander Alekhine won), Zlín 1943, and 4th at Teplitz-Schönau 1947. His peak years were about 1950, his best results being shared 2nd with Isaac Boleslavsky, Luděk Pachman, and Vasily Smyslov at Warsaw 1947 and 3rd at Bucharest 1949. Šajtar played on the Czechoslovak team against Great Britain in 1947 and in the Helsinki 1952 and Amsterdam 1954 Olympiads. He finished 2nd in the 1952 Czechoslovak Championship.

In 1956 Šajtar was elected vice-president of FIDE (as president of Zone 3 [Eastern Europe]). He served as a FIDE official until 1974, devoting himself to the organisation of chess. He often served as arbiter at the Students Olympiads.

Šajtar earned the International Master title in 1950 and became an International Arbiter in 1955 with arbiting accomplishments including World Championship matches. FIDE made him an Honorary Grandmaster in 1985.

== Notable chess games ==
- Jaroslav Sajtar vs Bogdan Sliwa, Warsaw 1947, Queen's Gambit Accepted (D23), 1-0 A nice, very short game: Undeveloped Black position is successfully attacked by the White light pieces.
- Jaroslav Sajtar vs Ludek Pachman, UJCS-17. Kongress 1943, Nimzo-Indian, 4.e3 O-O 5.Bd3 (E47), 1-0 Another short game of two (then young) Czech masters demonstrates a typical exchange sacrifice for the sake of attack.
