= Francesco Scafarelli =

Italian chess player

Personal information
- Born: 23 October 1933 Florence, Italy
- Died: 3 December 2007 (aged 74) Matera, Italy

Chess career
- Country: Italy
- Title: International Master (1957)

Francesco Scafarelli (23 October 1933 – 3 December 2007) was an Italian chess International Master (1957), Chess Olympiad individual bronze medal winner (1954).

== Biography ==
In 1952, in Ferrara in Italian Chess Championship Francesco Scafarelli won the title of chess master. He represented Italy in 1953 World Junior Chess Championship in Copenhagen. In 1959 he won the Italian Junior Chess tournament. Francesco Scafarelli has won three Italian Team Chess Championships for various clubs: in 1960 with Chess Napoletana, in 1969 and 1991 with Genoa Circle Centurini. Francesco Scafarelli took part in numerous chess tournaments: Portsmouth and Lucerne (both won 3rd place in 1952), Beverwijk (won 3rd place in 1956 and 2nd place in 1962), Madrid (won 1st place in 1956), Naples (won 2nd place in 1956). He has repeatedly represented Italy in a cross-country chess competition against Switzerland (1952, 1958, 1969), Austria (1952), Yugoslavia (1954, 1955), Czechoslovakia (1957). In 1957, as a member of the Florence team, Francesco Scafarelli played in a match against Riga team and played draw in one of the two games for the next World Chess Champion Mikhail Tal. In 1960, he won Grandmaster László Szabó in a match against Budapest team. Multiple participant in Italian chess championships, where Francesco Scafarelli made his debut in 1947 in Rome, but last participated 54 years later in 2001.

Francesco Scafarelli played for Italy in the Chess Olympiads:

- In 1952, at third board in the 10th Chess Olympiad in Helsinki (+0, =2, -6),
- In 1954, at fourth board in the 11th Chess Olympiad in Amsterdam (+9, =7, -1) and won individual bronze medal.

Francesco Scafarelli played for Italy in the Clare Benedict Chess Cups:

- In 1955, at first board in the 2nd Clare Benedict Chess Cu in Mont Pèlerin (+0, =5, -0),
- In 1958, at third board in the 5th Clare Benedict Chess Cup in Neuchâtel (+1, =2, -2),
- In 1959, at second board in the 6th Clare Benedict Chess Cup in Lugano (+2, =1, -2).

Francesco Scafarelli was awarded the International Master (IM) title in 1957.
