= Palle Nielsen (chess player) =

Danish chess player

Personal information
- Born: 4 May 1929
- Died: 1987

Chess career
- Country: Denmark

Palle Møller Nielsen (4 May 1929 – 1987), was a Danish chess player, and two-times Danish Chess Championship medalist (1952, 1954). Chess Olympiad individual bronze medal winner (1954).

== Biography ==
From the 1950s to the 1960s Palle Nielsen was one of the strongest Danish chess players. In 1952, in Danish Chess Championships he won silver medal. In 1954, in Danish Chess Championships he won bronze medal. In 1960, in Copenhagen Palle Nielsen participated in Aron Nimzowitsch memorial chess tournament.

Palle Nielsen played for Denmark in the Chess Olympiads:

- In 1952, at third board in the 10th Chess Olympiad in Helsinki (+5, =6, -2),
- In 1954, at third board in the 11th Chess Olympiad in Amsterdam (+10, =3, -3) and won individual bronze medal.
