= György Szilágyi =

Hungarian chess player

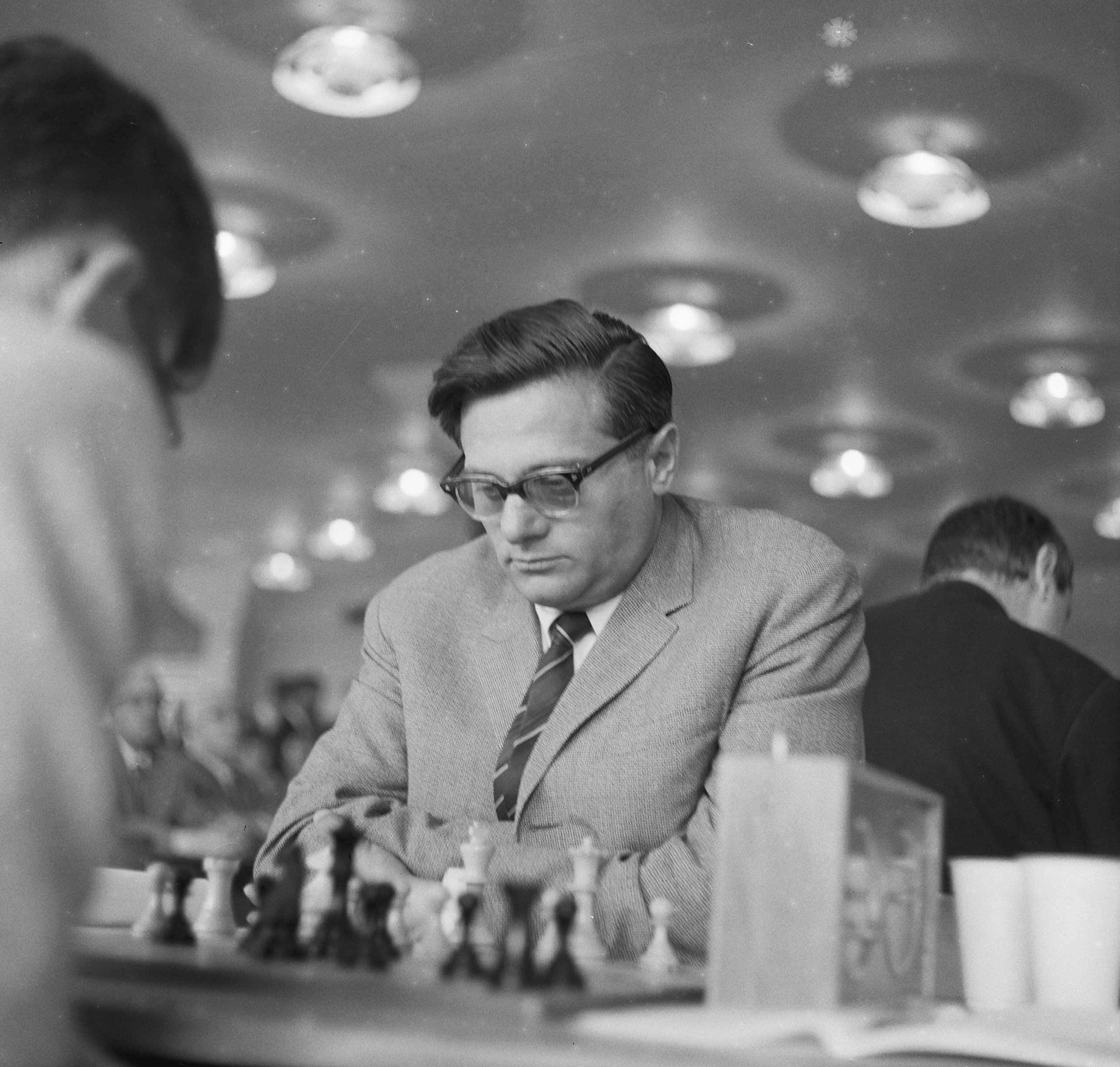
- György Szilágyi in 1965

Personal information
- Born: 4 July 1921 Budapest, Hungary
- Died: September 30, 1992 (aged 71) Budapest, Hungary

Chess career
- Country: Hungary
- Title: International Master (1956)

György Szilágyi (4 July 1921 – 30 September 1992), was a Hungarian chess International Master (1956), Chess Olympiad team bronze winner (1956).

== Biography ==
Szilágyi's first chess win was in 1937, winning the Hungarian Team Chess Championship with his team MTK. He participated twelve times in the Hungarian Chess Championship, with his best performances being 3rd and 4th place in 1950 and 1955, respectively. He was also successful in the Budapest City Chess Championship, winning 1st place in 1961, 3rd place in 1972, and 2nd place in 1973. Szilágyi won many international chess tournaments, including tournaments in Amsterdam (1965), Paris (1969) and Primorsko (1975).

György Szilágyi played for Hungary in the Chess Olympiads: In 1956, at the fourth board in the 12th Chess Olympiad in Moscow his team won the bronze medal. He was awarded the FIDE International Master (IM) title the same year.
