= Gedali Szapiro =

Polish-Israeli chess player

Gedali Shapiro (Grzegorz Szapiro) (later Gedalia Shapira) (Hebrew: גדלי שפירו; 28 October 1929 – 28 December 1972) was a Polish–Israeli chess master, born in Siedlce.

He tied for 7th-8th at Wrocław (Breslau) 1955 Polish Championship. He played for "Poland B" in the 3rd Triennial Cup (HUN–CSR–POL) at Warsaw in 1956.

Szapiro played twice in Chess Olympiads.

- In 1956, at the first reserve board in the 12th Chess Olympiad in Moscow (+1 – 4 = 2) for Poland;
- In 1962, at the second reserve board in the 15th Chess Olympiad in Varna (+4 – 2 = 5) for Israel.

He tied for 4th-5th with Yair Kraidman, behind Milan Matulović, Petar Trifunović and Moshe Czerniak, at Netanya 1961.

He died in Rishon Lezion, Israel.
