= Elio Romani =

Italian chess player (1920–1999)

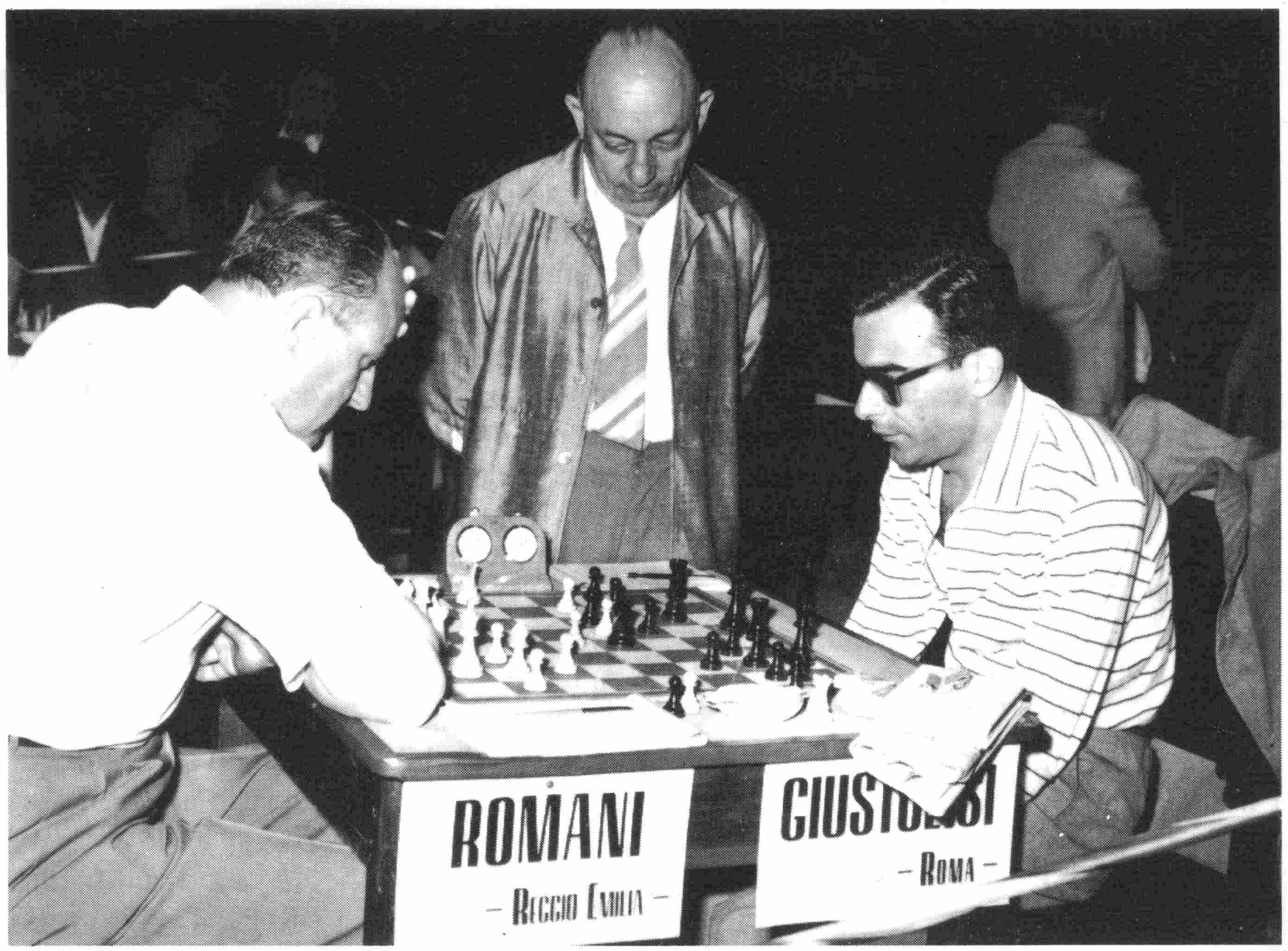

Personal information
- Born: 30 June 1920 Reggio Emilia, Italy
- Died: 09.1999 Lecco, Italy

Chess career
- Country: Italy

Elio Romani (30 June 1920 – September 1999) was an Italian chess player and Italian Chess Championship medalist (1964).

== Biography ==
From the late 1950s to the early 1970s, Elio Romani was one of Italy's leading chess players. A permanent participant in Italian Chess Championships, where he won a bronze medal in 1964.

Romani's biggest sporting success at the international chess level was securing 3rd place in a chess tournament held in the summer of 1951 in his hometown of Reggio Emilia. Romani then managed to defeat the winners of the tournament, Moshe Czerniak and Herman Steiner. Among those who were ahead of Romani in the tournament were Ludwig Rellstab, Esteban Canal, Robert Wade, as well as the leading Italian chess players of that time, headed by Enrico Paoli.

Elio Romani played for Italy in the Chess Olympiads:

- In 1958, at second board in the 13th Chess Olympiad in Munich (+8, =3, -5),
- In 1966, at fourth board in the 17th Chess Olympiad in Havana (+6, =3, -6),
- In 1968, at second reserve board in the 18th Chess Olympiad in Lugano (+5, =1, -4),
- In 1970, at second reserve board in the 19th Chess Olympiad in Siegen (+2, =2, -2).

Elio Romani played for Italy in the Clare Benedict Chess Cup:

- In 1960, at fourth board in the 7th Clare Benedict Chess Cup in Biel (+2, =2, -1).

In the mid-1970s, Elio Romani moved to Lecco, where he served as the commander of the municipal police department.
