= Carel van den Berg =

Dutch chess player (1924–1971)

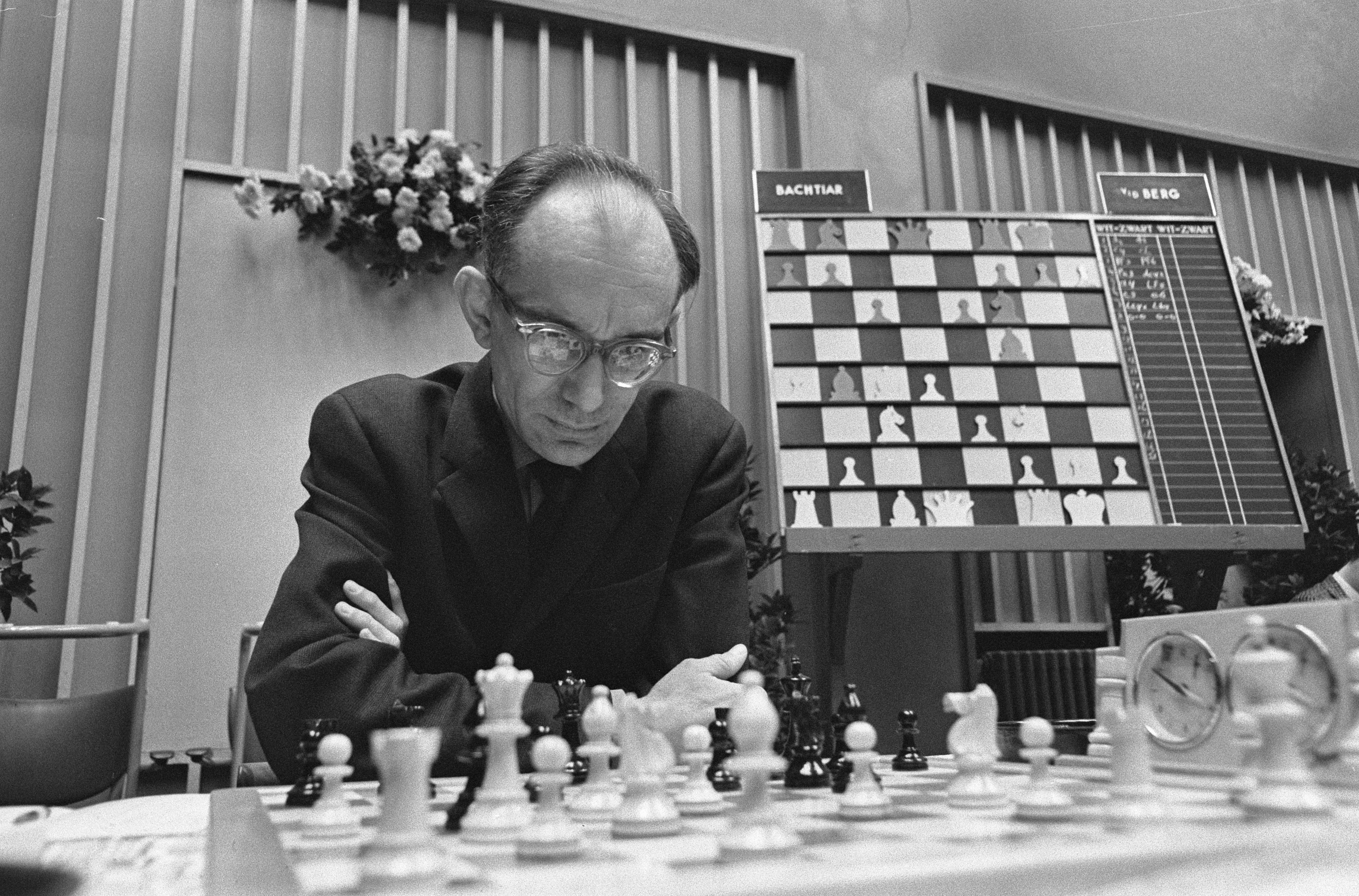
- Carel van den Berg in 1966
- Country: Netherlands
- Born: 12 February 1924; Hillegersberg, Netherlands
- Died: 29 June 1971 (aged 47); Leiden, Netherlands
- Title: International Master (1963)

Carel Benjamin van den Berg (12 February 1924 – 29 June 1971) was a Dutch chess International Master (IM) (1963).

== Biography ==
Carel van den Berg spent his childhood in Leiden, where he also attended the Stedelijk Gymnasium. Van den Berg studied in Delft University between 1942 and 1944, after the Second World War briefly in Amsterdam and then philosophy in University of Groningen.

Carel van den Berg was a well-known tournament chess player and international chess master (1963). He won Dutch Correspondence Chess Championship in 1943 and won the Daniël Noteboom memorial tournaments four times: in 1948, 1953, 1954 and 1959. Carel van den Berg was also a chess theorist and edited Losbladige Schaakberichten. He collaborated with Max Euwe in Candidates Tournament (Zürich, 1953) and on the books Theorie der Schaakopeningen series.

Carel van den Berg played for Netherlands in the Chess Olympiad:

- In 1958, at fourth board in the 13th Chess Olympiad in Munich (+2, =5, -4).

Carel van den Berg played for Netherlands in the European Team Chess Championship:

- In 1965, at third board in the 3rd European Team Chess Championship in Hamburg (+1, =2, -5).

Carel van den Berg played for Netherlands in the European Team Chess Championship preliminaries:

- In 1957, at eighth board in the 1st European Team Chess Championship preliminaries (+1, =0, -1),
- In 1965, at sixth board in the 3rd European Team Chess Championship preliminaries (+1, =1, -0).

Carel van den Berg played for Netherlands in the Clare Benedict Chess Cups:

- In 1956, at fourth board in the 3rd Clare Benedict Chess Cu in Lenzerheide (+2, =2, -1) and won team silver and individual gold medals,
- In 1957, at third board in the 4th Clare Benedict Chess Cup in Bern (+2, =1, -2) and won team silver medal,
- In 1958, at fourth board in the 5th Clare Benedict Chess Cup in Neuchâtel (+0, =3, -1),
- In 1963, at second board in the 10th Clare Benedict Chess Cup in Lucerne (+1, =4, -0) and won team silver medal,
- In 1965, at third board in the 12th Clare Benedict Chess Cup in West Berlin (+1, =3, -1) and won team bronze medal.
