= Georges Noradounguian =

French chess player (born 1930)

Personal information
- Born: 1930 (age 95–96)

Chess career
- Country: France

Georges Noradounguian (also Georges Nora, born 1930), is a French chess master, three times French Chess Championship medalist (1948, 1962, 1973).

== Biography ==
Georges Noradounguian is French chess player of Armenian origin. Often, for ease of pronunciation, he shortened his name to Georges Nora. From the end to 1940s to the begin 1970s Georges Noradounguian was one of the leading French chess players. In French Chess Championship Georges Noradounguian won three medals: silver (1948), and 2 bronze (1962, 1973).

Georges Noradounguian played for France in the Chess Olympiads:

- In 1954, at first reserve board in the 11th Chess Olympiad in Amsterdam (+2, =6, -4),
- In 1956, at fourth board in the 12th Chess Olympiad in Moscow (+2, =10, -3),
- In 1958, at second board in the 13th Chess Olympiad in Munich (+2, =8, -2),
- In 1960, at second reserve board in the 14th Chess Olympiad in Leipzig (+3, =6, -5),
- In 1962, at fourth board in the 15th Chess Olympiad in Varna (+2, =4, -5),
- In 1964, at first reserve board in the 16th Chess Olympiad in Tel Aviv (+2, =2, -3).

Georges Noradounguian played for France in the European Team Chess Championship preliminaries:

- In 1957, at sixth board in the 1st European Team Chess Championship preliminaries (+1, =0, -1).

Georges Noradounguian played for France in the Clare Benedict Chess Cup:

- In 1957, at second board in the 4th Clare Benedict Chess Cup in Bern (+0, =2, -3).
