= Ernst Weichselbaumer =

German chess player (1907–1967)

Personal information
- Born: 6 April 1907
- Died: 10 May 1967 (aged 60)

Chess career
- Country: Germany; Saar Protectorate

Ernst Weichselbaumer (6 April 1907 – 10 May 1967) was a German chess player.

== Biography ==
During the years of independence of the Saar (1947–1956), Ernst Weichselbaumer was one of the strongest chess players in the country. In 1955, he participated in the Saar chess team match against Switzerland.

Ernst Weichselbaumer played for Saar in the Chess Olympiad:

- In 1952, at third board in the 10th Chess Olympiad in Helsinki (+3, =2, −7),
- In 1954, at first reserve board in the 11th Chess Olympiad in Amsterdam (+5, =4, −5),
- In 1956, at third board in the 12th Chess Olympiad in Moscow (+5, =3, −4).

A rapid chess tournament in memory of Ernst Weichselbaumer is held in Saarbrücken.
