= Sylvain Burstein =

French chess player

Personal information
- Born: 1932
- Died: unknown

Chess career
- Country: France

Sylvain Burstein (1932 – unknown), was a French chess master, Chess Olympiad individual medalist (1954).

== Biography ==
In the 1950s Sylvain Burstein was one of the most promising young chess players in France, but finished his chess career very quickly. In 1950 he participated in the International Junior Chess Tournament in Birmingham, but one year later he represented France in the first World Junior Chess Championship, where he played drawn with tournament winner Borislav Ivkov. In 1951, he made his debut in the French Chess Championship final where he ranked 8th place. In recent years, Sylvain Burstein regularly participated in French Chess Championships, achieving the best result in 1955 in Toulouse, where he shared 3rd-4th place. In 1952 he was the second in Paris City Chess Championship.

Sylvain Burstein played for France in the Chess Olympiads:

- In 1954, at second reserve board in the 11th Chess Olympiad in Amsterdam (+6, =5, -0),
- In 1956, at third board in the 12th Chess Olympiad in Moscow (+4, =6, -3).

In 1953–1954 Sylvain Burstein participated in Hastings traditional Christmas Chess festival, which he played in a Premier reserves tournament. The last known tournament with Burstein's participation was in the Israel cities Haifa and Tel Aviv in which won United States grandmaster Samuel Reshevsky, but Burstein stayed at the bottom of the table. There is no reliable information about Burstein's end of life.
