= Wiktor Balcarek =

Polish chess player

Personal information
- Born: 29 December 1915 Świętochłowice, Poland
- Died: 30 August 1998 (aged 82) Bytom, Poland

Chess career
- Country: Poland

Wiktor Balcarek (29 December 1915 – 30 August 1998) was a Polish chess player who won the Polish Chess Championship in 1950.

== Chess career ==
From 1949 to 1957 Wiktor Balcarek played six times in the Polish Chess Championship's finals, and in 1950 in Bielsko-Biała won the tournament. Multiple participated in Polish Team Chess Championship, where he played for the team of the Katowice and won one gold (1958), three silver (1957, 1959, 1973) and eight bronze medals (1946, 1955, 1956, 1960, 1963, 1965, 1968, 1970).

Wiktor Balcarek played for Poland in Chess Olympiads:

- In 1956, at second reserve board in the 12th Chess Olympiad in Moscow (+1, =1, -5).
