= Per Lindblom =

Norwegian chess player

Personal information
- Born: unknown
- Died: unknown

Chess career
- Country: Norway

Per Lindblom (unknown – unknown) was a Norwegian chess player.

== Biography ==
From the mid-1950s to the mid-1960s Per Lindblom was one of the leading Norwegian chess players. In 1957, in Wageningen Per Lindblom represented Norway in World Chess Championship Zonal Tournament.

Per Lindblom played for Norway in the Chess Olympiads:

- In 1954, at third board in the 11th Chess Olympiad in Amsterdam (+2, =3, -6),
- In 1956, at third board in the 12th Chess Olympiad in Moscow (+1, =7, -5),
- In 1958, at first reserve board in the 13th Chess Olympiad in Munich (+2, =3, -3),
- In 1960, at third board in the 14th Chess Olympiad in Leipzig (+7, =9, -1),
- In 1962, at second board in the 15th Chess Olympiad in Varna (+0, =1, -4).

Per Lindblom played for Norway in the World Student Team Chess Championships:

- In 1954, at first board in the 1st World Student Team Chess Championship in Oslo (+3, =3, -2),
- In 1956, at first board in the 3rd World Student Team Chess Championship in Uppsala (+0, =3, -7).
