= Miklós Bély =

Hungarian chess player

Personal information
- Born: 9 August 1913 Budapest, Hungary
- Died: 27 September 1970 (aged 57) Győr, Hungary

Chess career
- Country: Hungary
- Title: International Master (1956)

Miklós Bély (9 August 1913 – 27 September 1970), was a Hungarian chess International Master (1956), Chess Olympiad team bronze winner (1956).

== Biography ==
Miklós Bély was a medical doctor. In the 1950s he was one of Hungary's leading chess players. Miklós Bély participated in Hungarian Chess Championship where best result reached in 1954, when he shared 3rd-4th place, and in 1955, when he ranked 5th. Miklós Bély was laureate of many international chess tournaments, including shared 1st-2nd place in Smederevska Palanka (1956), and won 2nd place in Reggio nell'Emilia (1959/60).

Miklós Bély played for Hungary in the Chess Olympiads:

- In 1956, at reserve board in the 12th Chess Olympiad in Moscow (+4, =5, -2) and won team bronze medal.

In 1956, he was awarded the FIDE International Master (IM) title.

Miklós Bély died after a stress-induced heart attack during a chess game.
