= Korson =

Korson is a surname. notable people with the surname include:

- Adam Korson, Canadian actor
- George Korson (1899–1967), American folklorist, journalist and historian

== See also ==
- Lorson
- Morson
