= Fiorentino Palmiotto =

Italian chess player (1929–2021)

Personal information
- Born: 9 April 1929 Ravenna, Italy
- Died: 1 August 2021 (aged 92) Molinella, Italy

Chess career
- Country: Italy
- Title: International Arbiter (1991)

Fiorentino Palmiotto (9 April 1929 – 1 August 2021) was an Italian chess player and International Arbiter (1991).

== Biography ==
From the 1950s to the 1970s, Palmiotto was one of Italy's leading chess players. In 1958, he was awarded the National Master title. In 1964, Palmiotto won the 16th Italian Correspondence Chess Championship. He was also a silver (1962) and four-time bronze (1961, 1967, 1971, 1972) medalist in Italian Correspondence Chess Championships. In 1965, Fiorentino Palmiotto won the Italian Chess Blitz Championship. He won Italian chess tournaments in San Benedetto del Tronto (1965) and Rovigo (1976). In 1972, Palmiotto, with the Bologna Chess Club team, won the Italian Team Chess Championship. He three times in row won Italian Senior Chess Championship in 1993, 1994 and 1995.

Palmiotto played for Italy in the Chess Olympiads:

- In 1958, at fourth board in the 13th Chess Olympiad in Munich (+2, =4, -6),
- In 1960, at third board in the 14th Chess Olympiad in Leipzig (+6, =6, -4).

Palmiotto served as an advisor to the Italian Chess Federation.
