= Wilhelm Ramm =

Norwegian chess player

Personal information
- Born: 1921
- Died: 1982 (aged 60–61)

Chess career
- Country: Norway

Wilhelm Ramm (1921–1982) was a Norwegian chess player.

== Biography ==
In the mid-1950s, Wilhelm Ramm was one of the leading Norwegian chess players. He played mainly in domestic chess tournaments and Norwegian Chess Championships.

Wilhelm Ramm played for Norway in the Chess Olympiads:

- In 1952, at first reserve board in the 10th Chess Olympiad in Helsinki (+0, =0, −3),
- In 1954, at second reserve board in the 11th Chess Olympiad in Amsterdam (+2, =4, −5).
