= Fakes Forgeries Experts =

Fakes Forgeries Experts, No. 6 May 2003.

Fakes Forgeries Experts is an annual magazine on forgery in philately. It was established in 1998 and is published by Postiljonen on behalf of the Fédération Internationale de Philatélie and the International Association of Philatelic Experts.

The first editor-in-chief was Paolo Vollmeier, followed by Knud Mohr from No. 7, 2004. The current editor-in-chief is Jonas Hällström and Knud Mohr continues as honorary editor.
