= E. Verner Nielsen =

Danish chess player

Personal information
- Born: 23 May 1899
- Died: 12 December 1981 (aged 82)

Chess career
- Country: Denmark

E. Verner Nielsen (23 May 1899 – 12 December 1981), was a Danish chess player.

In 1919, in Copenhagen in simultaneous exhibition E. Verner Nielsen won the World Chess Champion Emanuel Lasker. From 1925 to 1956 he was multiple participant of the Danish Chess Championships. His best result - 4th place in 1947 and 1949.

E. Verner Nielsen played for Denmark in the Chess Olympiad:

- In 1954, at fourth board in the 11th Chess Olympiad in Amsterdam (+3, =1, -1).

In his mature years he played actively correspondence chess.
