= Roman Dworzyński =

Polish chess player

Personal information
- Born: 8 June 1934 (age 92) Rządza, Poland

Chess career
- Country: Poland

Roman Dworzyński (born 8 June 1934) is a Polish chess player. He is a Polish Chess Championship medalist from 1955.

== Chess career ==
Roman Dworzyński achieved his first chess successes in 1951, winning in Zakopane the title of vice-champion of Polish Junior Chess Championship and making his debut in Łódź in the Polish Chess Championship final. Until 1957 Roman Dworzyński participated in all seven finals. His greatest success in 1955 in Wrocław, where he won the silver medal. Thanks to this success, he qualified for the national team and performed at 12th Chess Olympiad in Moscow where on the 3rd board he scored 8½ points in 15 games. In 1955 Roman Dworzyński appeared in an international chess tournament in Erfurt, and a year later in Mariánské Lázně, but he did not achieve success in them. He has the title of National Master. In 1958 Roman Dworzyński practically ended his chess career, in the following years he sporadically appeared in team chess tournaments.
