= Israel Kniazer =

Israeli chess player

Personal information
- Native name: ישראל קניאז'ר
- Born: 1 April 1894
- Died: 4 May 1958 (aged 64)

Chess career
- Country: Israel

Israel Yosef Kniazer (Hebrew: ישראל יוסף קניאז'ר; 1 April 1894 – 4 May 1958) was an Israeli chess player.

== Biography ==
During the 1930s Israel Kniazer immigrants from Poland to Mandatory Palestine and was active in chess. He participated in several chess tournaments held in Tel Aviv.

In 1951, Israel Kniazer participated in the Israeli Chess Championship and finished in 2nd place. In 1953, he participated in the Israeli Chess Championship and shared 2nd – 3rd places.

Israel Kniazer played for Israel in the Chess Olympiad:

- In 1954, at first reserve board in the 11th Chess Olympiad in Amsterdam (+0, =8, -1).
