= Frits Roessel =

Dutch chess player (1937–2025)

Personal information
- Born: 5 February 1937 Djokjakarta, Dutch East Indies
- Died: 30 April 2025 (aged 88) Amsterdam, Netherlands

Chess career
- Country: Netherlands

Frits Ernst Roessel (5 February 1937 – 30 April 2025) was a Dutch chess player.

== Biography ==
From the late 1950s to the mid-1960s, Roessel was one of the leading new generation chess players in the Netherlands. In 1953, in Copenhagen he played in 2nd World Junior Chess Championship and ranked in 11th place (3rd in Final B). In 1955, Roessel won 1st Dutch Open Chess Championship.

Roessel played for Netherlands in the Chess Olympiad:

- In 1958, at second reserve board in the 13th Chess Olympiad in Munich (+6, =3, -2).

Roessel played for Netherlands in the European Team Chess Championship preliminaries:

- In 1965, at fourth board in the 3rd European Team Chess Championship preliminaries (+2, =0, -0).

Roessel played for Netherlands in the World Student Team Chess Championships:

- In 1955, at second board in the 2nd World Student Team Chess Championship in Lyon (+4, =2, -3),
- In 1958, at first board in the 5th World Student Team Chess Championship in Varna (+5, =1, -4),
- In 1961, at second board in the 8th World Student Team Chess Championship in Helsinki (+4, =7, -1),
- In 1963, at third board in the 10th World Student Team Chess Championship in Budva (+5, =5, -2).

Roessel played for Netherlands in the Clare Benedict Chess Cup:

- In 1957, at fourth board in the 4th Clare Benedict Chess Cup in Bern (+3, =1, -1) and won team silver medal,
- In 1961, at second board in the 8th Clare Benedict Chess Cup in Neuhausen (+1, =3, -1).

Roessel died in Amsterdam on 30 April 2025, at the age of 88.
