= Ross Siemms =

Canadian chess player

Personal information
- Born: 7 September 1935 (age 90)

Chess career
- Country: Canada

Ross Siemms (born 7 September 1935) is a Canadian chess player, Canadian Correspondence Chess Championship medalist (1994).

== Chess career ==
In the 1950s, Ross Siemms was one of Canada's leading junior chess players. In 1950, he shared 1st place in U.S. Junior Chess Championship but lost additional match. In 1953, in Copenhagen Ross Siemms represented Canada in the second World Junior Chess Championship and shared 6th – 8th place. In 1954, he won U.S. Junior Open Chess Championship and Canadian Junior Chess Championship. In the same year he participated in Pan-American Chess Championship and ranked in 17th place.

Ross Siemms played for Canada in the Chess Olympiad:

- In 1958, at second reserve board in the 13th Chess Olympiad in Munich (+4, =3, -4).

Also Ross Siemms played correspondence chess and won silver medal in the Canadian Correspondence Chess Championship (1994).
