= Ugo Calà =

Italian chess player

Personal information
- Born: 9 August 1904 Catania, Italy
- Died: 10 July 1983 (aged 78) Rome, Italy

Chess career
- Country: Italy

Ugo Calà (9 August 1904 – 10 July 1983) was an Italian chess player.

== Biography ==
In the 1920s Ugo Calà participated in two team matches against the Syracuse team and ranking in 2nd place in the second regional chess tournament in Palermo. Then, after graduating in engineering, he moved permanently to Rome. Ugo Calà participated in the chess tournaments of Foligno (1924) and in 1925 he won the title of Rome chess champion. His career was from that moment studded with numerous successes and affirmations both nationally and internationally. In 1931, in Milan chess tournament Ugo Calà achieved promotion to National Master title.

Ugo Calà played for Italy in the Chess Olympiads:

- In 1952, at fourth board in the 10th Chess Olympiad in Helsinki (+2, =3, -6),
- In 1954, at first reserve board in the 11th Chess Olympiad in Amsterdam (+2, =9, -3).
