= Aage Ingerslev =

Danish chess player (1933–2003)

Personal information
- Born: 10 October 1933
- Died: 14 January 2003 (aged 69)

Chess career
- Country: Denmark
- Title: International Correspondence Chess Master (1994)

Aage Ingerslev (10 October 1933 – 14 January 2003) was a Danish chess player, Danish Chess Championship silver medalist (1957).

== Biography ==
In the 1950s Aage Ingerslev was one of the strongest Danish chess players. In 1957, he won silver medal in Danish Chess Championship.

Aage Ingerslev played for Denmark in the Chess Olympiad:

- In 1956, at fourth board in the 12th Chess Olympiad in Moscow (+2, =5, -5).

Aage Ingerslev played for Denmark in the Nordic Chess Cup:

- In 1972, at fourth board in the 3rd Nordic Chess Cup in Großenbrode (+1, =3, -0) and won team silver medal.

Aage Ingerslev played for Denmark in the Clare Benedict Chess Cup:

- In 1973, at reserve board in the 20th Clare Benedict Chess Cup in Gstaad (+1, =4, -0) and won team bronze medal.

In later years, Aage Ingerslev active participated in correspondence chess tournaments. In 1994, he was awarded the International Correspondence Chess Master (IM) title.
