= Shlomo Smiltiner =

Israeli chess player

Shlomo Smiltiner (Hebrew: שלמה סמילטינר; 27 November 1915 – 13 August 2015) was an Israeli chess master.

He played thrice for Israel in Chess Olympiads.

- In 1956, at second reserve board in 12th Chess Olympiad in Moscow (+3 –3 =2);
- In 1958, at fourth board in 13th Chess Olympiad in Munich (+8 –4 =3);
- In 1966, at second reserve board in 17th Chess Olympiad in Havana (+3 –2 =4).
