= Ljungqvist =

Ljungqvist is Swedish surname, which may refer to:

- Alexander Ljungqvist, Swedish economist
- Arne Ljungqvist (born 1931), Swedish medical researcher
- Ida Ljungqvist (born 1981), Tanzanian-Swedish model
- Lennart Ljungqvist (1931–1991), Swedish chess player
- Stefan Ljungqvist (1948–2023), Swedish singer and actor
- Sture Ljungqvist (1921–2004), Swedish architect
