= Warwick Nash =

Irish chess player

Personal information
- Born: 29 June 1907 Athlone, Ireland
- Died: 1983 Ballinasloe, Ireland

Chess career
- Country: Ireland

Warwick Nash (also William Nash; 29 June 1907 – 1983), was an Irish chess player, Irish Correspondence Chess Championship winner (1964).

== Biography ==
In the end of 1930s to the begin of 1960s Warwick Nash was one of the strongest Irish chess players. He eleven times participated in Irish Chess Championships: 1940, 1946, 1947, 1948, 1949, 1950, 1951, 1952, 1953, 1960, and 1961.

Warwick Nash played for Ireland in the Chess Olympiads:

- In 1939, at first reserve board in the 8th Chess Olympiad in Buenos Aires (+1, =5, -7),
- In 1954, at first reserve board in the 11th Chess Olympiad in Amsterdam (+0, =2, -10),
- In 1960, at fourth board in the 14th Chess Olympiad in Leipzig (+2, =2, -7).

Also Warwick Nash participated in correspondence chess tournament. In 1936, 1940, 1964, he won Irish Correspondence Chess Championship.

Warwick was also the brother of the noted Irish doctor John Nash.
