= Enda Rohan =

Irish chess player (1929–2022)

Personal information
- Born: 16 October 1929 Dublin, Ireland
- Died: 7 January 2022 (aged 92) Claregalway, Ireland

Chess career
- Country: Ireland

Enda Rohan (16 October 1929 – 7 January 2022) was an Irish chess player. He was the Irish Chess Union secretary from 1952 to 1957.

== Biography ==
Enda Rohan was born in Clontarf, Dublin. In 1952 he graduated from University College Dublin in which he studied physics. From 1952 to 1995 Enda Rohan worked as an engineer in various telecommunications companies both in Ireland and in other countries: in Malaysia (1965), Liberia (1966–1967) and Albania (1994–1995). In 1947 he was one of the founders of a Clontarf Chess Club. From 1952 to 1957 Enda Rohan was appointed secretary of the Irish Chess Union. He has done much to develop the international contacts of Irish chess life.

Rohan played for Ireland in the Chess Olympiad:

- In 1954, at second reserve board in the 11th Chess Olympiad in Amsterdam (+0, =0, -2).

Rohan died in Claregalway on 7 January 2022, at the age of 92.
