= Dieter Bertholdt =

German chess player

Personal information
- Born: 20 July 1935 Dresden, Germany

Chess career
- Country: East Germany

Dieter Bertholdt (born 20 July 1935) is a German chess player.

== Biography ==
Dieter Bertholdt is a graduate mathematician and has worked in the aircraft industry. His first chess club, which he joined in 1949, was SG Mickten in Dresden. From there he moved to Sportclub Einheit Dresden, with which he won the East Germany Team Chess Championships in 1957, 1958 and 1962. He also had notable success in the East Germany Chess Championships. At the 6th East Germany Chess Championship, held in 1956 in Leipzig, he scored 9.5 points from 15 games and finished third. At the following championship, held in Sömmerda in 1957, he finished second.

Dieter Bertholdt played for East Germany in the Chess Olympiad:

- In 1958, at fourth board in the 13th Chess Olympiad in Munich (+2, =7, -3).

Dieter Bertholdt played for East Germany in the World Student Team Chess Championships:

- In 1956, at fourth board in the 3rd World Student Team Chess Championship in Uppsala (+5, =0, -3),
- In 1957, at second board in the 4th World Student Team Chess Championship in Reykjavík (+4, =7, -2),
- In 1958, at third board in the 5th World Student Team Chess Championship in Varna (+1, =4, -2),
- In 1959, at fourth board in the 6th World Student Team Chess Championship in Budapest (+5, =4, -1),
- In 1960, at third board in the 7th World Student Team Chess Championship in Leningrad (+6, =1, -4).

In 1962 Bertholdt retired from competitive chess. He did not play again until 1987.
