= Otto Benkner =

German chess player

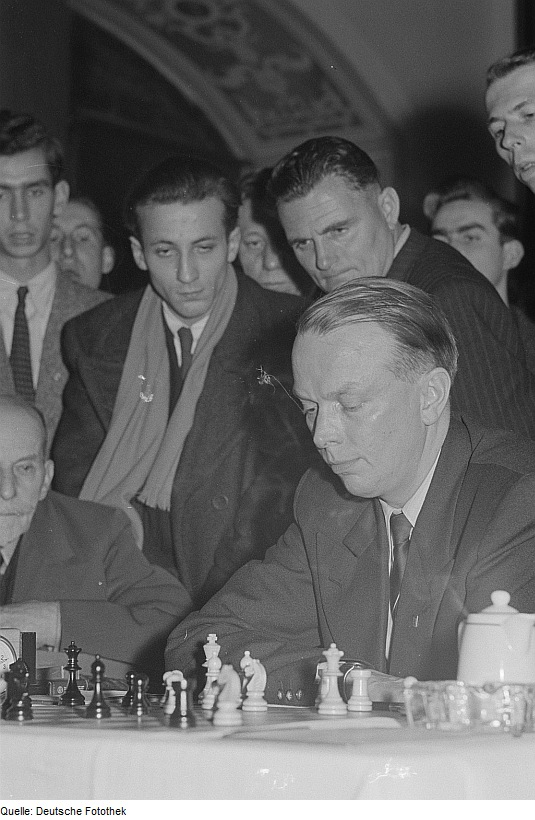
- Otto Benkner in West German Chess Championship in 1953

Personal information
- Born: 5 April 1909 Frankfurt, Germany
- Died: 26 January 1996 (aged 86) Saarbrücken, Germany

Chess career
- Country: Germany; Saar Protectorate; Germany

Otto Benkner (5 April 1909 – 26 January 1996) was a German chess player.

== Biography ==
Otto Benkner twice won Frankfurt City Chess Championship (1930, 1937). In 1934, he was a winner of the Rhine Chess Congress and bronze medalist at the German Team Chess Championship.

From 1938 Otto Benkner lived in Saarbrücken. He became the Chess Champion of the Saar 11 times (the last time in 1966), including victories in the Chess Championship of the Saar Protectorate in 1948, 1949, 1951 and 1954. In 1939, he was silver medalist of the Saar Chess Championship. He was in charge of the press service of the Saar Chess Federation. From 1948 to 1990 Otto Benkner was the head of the chess department of the newspaper Saarbrücker Zeitung.

Otto Benkner played for Saar in the Chess Olympiad:

- In 1952, at second board in the 10th Chess Olympiad in Helsinki (+6, =6, -2),
- In 1954, at first board in the 11th Chess Olympiad in Amsterdam (+8, =4, -4),
- In 1956, at first board in the 12th Chess Olympiad in Moscow (+3, =4, -6).

He took part in the Second World War. He fought on the Eastern Front. In 1943 he was seriously wounded by a grenade fragment and lost his left arm. Due to problems with his own health and a serious illness of his wife, he retired from chess tournaments in 1967.
