= Zoltan Kovács (chess player) =

Hungarian chess player (born 1930)

Personal information
- Born: 21 February 1930 (age 96) Debrecen, Hungary

Chess career
- Country: Hungary
- FIDE rating: 1978 (July 2012)
- Peak rating: 2128 (July 2006)

Zoltan Kovács (born 21 February 1930) is a Hungarian chess player. He was Chess Olympiad individual medalist (1954).

== Biography ==
In 1960, in San Francisco, Kovács won International Chess Open Tournament California Open and California state chess championship.

Zoltan Kovács played for Austria in the Chess Olympiad:

- In 1954, at first reserve board in the 11th Chess Olympiad in Amsterdam (+7, =4, -2) and won individual bronze medal.

Zoltan Kovács played for Hungary in the World Student Team Chess Championship:

- In 1965, at first reserve board in the 12th World Student Team Chess Championship in Sinaia (+2, =2, -3).

From 2000 he rarely participated in chess tournaments.
