= Gyula Kluger =

Hungarian chess player (1914–1994)

Personal information
- Born: 15 January 1914 Sátoraljaújhely, Kingdom of Hungary
- Died: 23 September 1994 (aged 80) Budapest, Hungary

Chess career
- Country: Hungary
- Title: International Master (1957)

Gyula Kluger (15 January 1914, Sátoraljaújhely, Zemplén County, Kingdom of Hungary – 23 September 1994, Budapest) was a Hungarian chess master.

He was the nephew of István Fazekas. In 1932, he won in Šluknov. In 1935, he took 7th in Tatatóváros (László Szabó won). In 1936, he tied for 8-10th in Budapest (Mieczysław Najdorf and Lajos Steiner won).

After World War II, in 1953, he took 2nd in the Hungarian Chess Championship. In 1954, he tied for 10-12th in Mariánské Lázně (Marienbad). The event (zonal tournament) was won by Luděk Pachman. In 1954, he took 5th in Bucharest. In 1956/57, he won the Challengers tournament in Hastings. In 1957, he tied for 2nd-3rd in Varna. In 1957/58, he tied for 5-6th in Hastings. In 1960, he tied for 3rd-5th in Balatonfüred (Asztalos memorial). In 1963, he tied for 9-10th in Polanica Zdrój (1st Rubinstein memorial).

In 1966, he tied for 7-8th in Polanica Zdrój (4th Rubinstein memorial). In 1967, he tied for 3rd-4th in Debrecen. In 1967, he tied for 2nd-3rd in the Budapest championships. In 1968, he tied for 5th-6th in Zombor. In 1968, he tied for 2nd-3rd in the Budapest championships. In 1970, he tied for 3rd-4th in Budapest (26th HUN-ch; István Bilek won). In 1973, he tied for 7-8th in Budapest. In 1977, he took 2nd in Oslo. In 1977, he tied for 3rd-6th in Bagneux. In 1978, he tied for 2nd-3rd in Satu Mare. In 1979, he tied for 2nd-4th in the Budapest championships.

Kluger played more than 50 games in the Hungarian national team in International team matches. He won two gold medals (team and individual at 6th board) in 1st Triennal Cup at Budapest 1954, two gold medals (team and individual at 3rd board) in 2nd Triennal Cup at Prague 1955, and two gold medals (team and individual at 5th board) in 3rd Triennal Cup at Warsaw 1956.

He was a member of the Hungarian team in two Chess Olympiads.

- In 1954, at second board in 11th Chess Olympiad in Amsterdam (+6 –5 =4);
- In 1960, at second reserve board in 14th Chess Olympiad in Leipzig (+4 –1 =5), where he won individual bronze medal.

He was also a member of the bronze medal winner team in the European Chess Team Championship at Hamburg 1965.

Awarded the Czech master title in 1932, the Hungarian master title in 1935, and the IM title in 1954.
