= Veikko Hänninen =

Finnish chess player

Personal information
- Born: 4 April 1929 Jyväskylä, Finland
- Died: 24 January 1981 (aged 51) Jyväskylä, Finland

Chess career
- Country: Finland

Veikko Hänninen (4 April 1929 – 24 January 1981) was a Finnish chess player and writer, Finnish Chess Championship medalist (1956).

== Biography ==
In the second half of 1950s, Veikko Hänninen was one of Finland's leading chess players. In Finnish Chess Championships he has won silver (1956) medal. In 1957, in Wageningen Veikko Hänninen participated in World Chess Championship Zonal tournament.

Veikko Hänninen played for Finland in the Chess Olympiads:

- In 1956, at first reserve board in the 12th Chess Olympiad in Moscow (+1, =3, -1).

Veikko Hänninen was also known as a writer. His main work is The Fishing Line (Finnish: Siima soi, Gummerus 1978). The book tells about fishing (primarily northern pike fishing).
