= Egon Joppen =

German chess player (1926–2018)

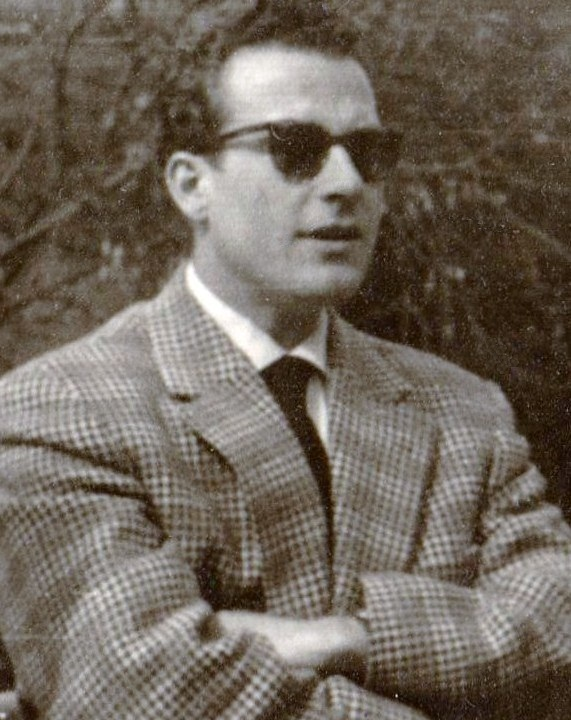
- Egon Joppen in 1956

Personal information
- Born: 25 April 1926
- Died: 2018

Chess career
- Country: Germany; Switzerland

Egon Joppen (25 April 1926 – November 2018) was a German chess player.

== Biography ==
In 1943, Joppen won the German Junior Chess Championship. In the mid-1950s he was one of the leading chess players in West Germany. In 1952, Egon Joppen won Baden-Württemberg Chess Championship. Also he three times won Hesse Chess Championships (1954, 1956, 1959). Egon Joppen was awarded German National Chess Master title.

Joppen played for West Germany in the Chess Olympiad:

- In 1954, at second reserve board in the 11th Chess Olympiad in Amsterdam (+5, =5, -1).

Joppen played for West Germany in the European Team Chess Championship preliminaries:

- In 1957, at seventh board in the 1st European Team Chess Championship preliminaries (+1, =1, -1).

Joppen later moved to Switzerland.
