= Andreas Dückstein =

Austrian chess grandmaster (1927–2024)

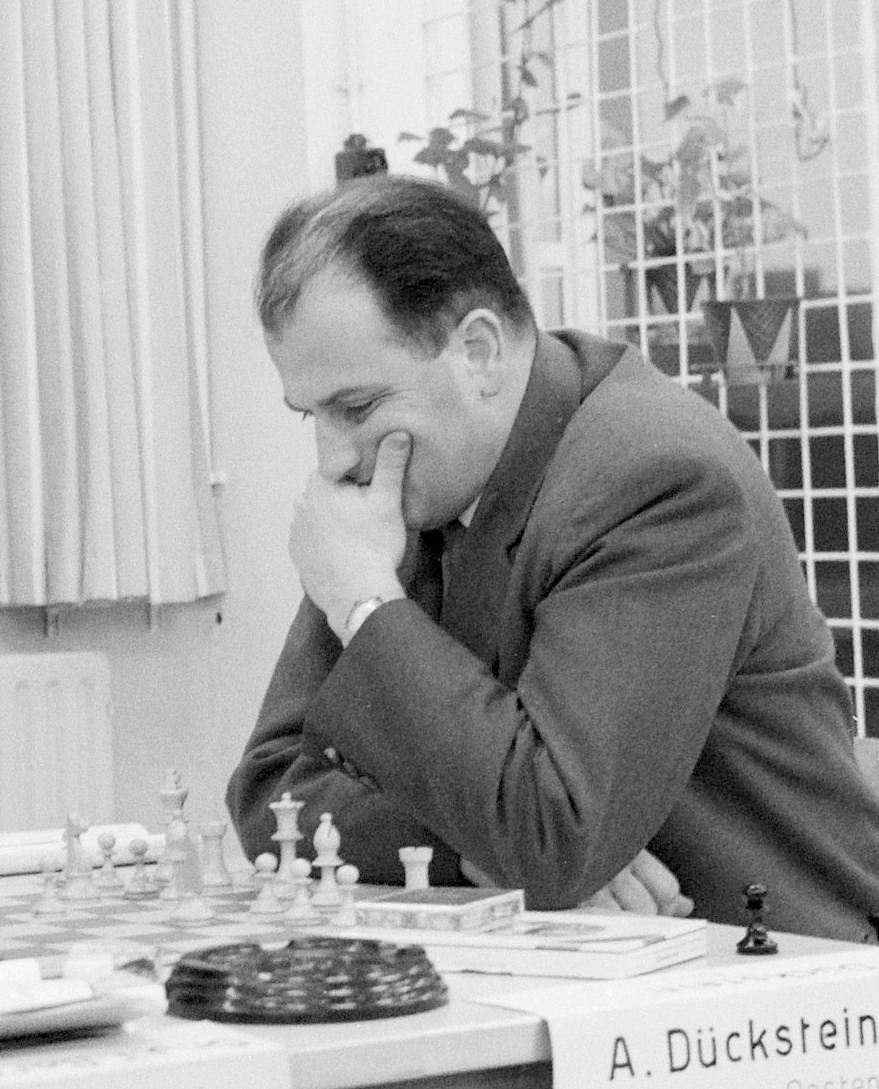
- Dückstein in 1960

Personal information
- Born: 2 August 1927 Budapest, Hungary
- Died: 28 August 2024 (aged 97)

Chess career
- Country: Austria
- Title: International Master (1956); Grandmaster (2024)
- Peak rating: 2430 (January 1975)

Andreas Dückstein (2 August 1927 – 28 August 2024) was an Austrian chess master. He was awarded the International Master title in 1956 and Honorary Grandmaster title in 2024. Dückstein was regarded as a dangerous attacker, as a win against World Champion Mikhail Botvinnik demonstrated.

== Biography ==
Born in Hungary, he left for Austria at the age of 22. Dückstein was thrice Austrian Champion (1954, 1956, 1977).

He tied for 11–13th at Zagreb 1955 (Vasily Smyslov won), took 14th at Wageningen 1957 (zonal, László Szabó won), took 5th at Hastings 1958/59 (Wolfgang Uhlmann won), shared 2nd at Berg en Dal (zonal, Friðrik Ólafsson won), tied for 4–6th at Vienna 1961 (Yuri Averbakh won), took 3rd at Amsterdam 1964 (IBM, Bent Larsen won), took 4th at Palma de Mallorca 1965.

He played for Austria in several Chess Olympiads:

- In 1956, at second board in 12th Chess Olympiad in Moscow (+11 –2 =4);
- In 1958, at first board in 13th Chess Olympiad in Munich (+6 –5 =8);
- In 1962, at second board in 15th Chess Olympiad in Varna (+2 –6 =2);
- In 1964, at first board in 16th Chess Olympiad in Tel Aviv (+8 –5 =3);
- In 1968, at first board in 18th Chess Olympiad in Lugano (+5 –2 =5);
- In 1970, at first board in 19th Chess Olympiad in Siegen (+4 –2 =6);
- In 1974, at second board in 21st Chess Olympiad in Nice (+8 –0 =4);
- In 1976, at second board in 22nd Chess Olympiad in Haifa (+5 –4 =1);
- In 1988, at second reserve board in 28th Chess Olympiad in Thessaloniki (+2 –2 =3).

He won two individual gold medals, at Moscow 1956 and at Nice 1974, and was awarded the International Master (IM) title in 1956.

In February 2024, he was awarded by FIDE the title of Honorary Grandmaster. He was then the oldest living grandmaster. Dückstein died on 28 August 2024, at the age of 97. After his death, Iivo Nei became the oldest living grandmaster.
