= Erwin Nievergelt =

Swiss chess player (1929–2018)

- Born: 29 April 1929; Zürich, Switzerland
- Died: 4 August 2018 (aged 89); Calpe, Spain
- Spouse: Marlies Ehrensperger
- Children: 4
- Chess career
- Country: Switzerland

Erwin Nievergelt (29 April 1929 — 4 August 2018) was a Swiss chess player, mathematician and economist.

== Biography ==
Erwin Nievergelt graduated from University of Zurich. In 1956 he defended his thesis Die Rangkorrelation U for a degree Doctor of Philosophy. Erwin Nievergelt engaged in Business informatics: developed a system of electronic processing of economic information. In 1967-1971 he worked as Privatdozent at University of Basel. From 1971 to 1994 Erwin Nievergelt worked as Professor for information systems and computer science at the University of St. Gallen. In 1984 he moved to the post of extraordinary professor of computer science. In parallel with his scientific work, Erwin Nievergelt engaged in predicting Exchange rate using Artificial neural network and Artificial intelligence.

He was fond of music and from time to time performed piano concerts. At the age of 60 he started to be engaged in triathlon.

The last years of his life were spent in Spain and Kenya.

== Chess career ==
For a decade and a half Erwin Nievergelt played in chess competitions. In 1954, he ranked 2nd in the tournament in Zürich, ahead of former world champion Max Euwe. Erwin Nievergelt took part in several strong international chess tournaments. He won the Swiss team championship five times. In 1957, Erwin Nievergelt won silver medal in the Swiss Chess Championship. He founded the Aron Nimzowitsch chess club in Zürich.

Erwin Nievergelt played for Switzerland in the Chess Olympiads:

- In 1954, at third board in the 11th Chess Olympiad in Amsterdam (+8, =0, -4),
- In 1958, at reserve board in the 13th Chess Olympiad in Munich (+5, =3, -5).

Erwin Nievergelt played for Switzerland in the European Team Chess Championship preliminaries:

- In 1961, at eight board in the 2nd European Team Chess Championship preliminaries (+2, =1, -1).

Also Erwin Nievergelt five times participated in Clare Benedict Chess Cup (1957, 1959, 1965–1967).

== Personal life ==
In 1964 Erwin Nievergelt married Marlies Ehrensperger. Marlies and Erwin had four daughters:

- Caroline Nievergelt, a biologist
- Christine Nievergelt, a teacher
- Sabine Nievergelt, a teacher
- Susanne Nievergelt, a business consultant

== Literature ==
- Antonio Iglesias Martín: Erwin Nievergelt: Entre la emociόn y el talento. Editorial Club Universitario, San Vicente 2005.
