= Miguel Albareda Creus =

Spanish chess player

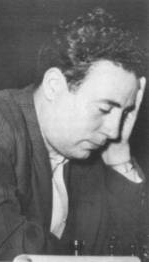
Miguel Albareda c. 1941

Miguel Albareda Creus (20 February 1919 in Sabadell - 13 April 2012) was a Spanish chess player. He was once runner-up in the 1945 Spanish competition behind the international master Antonio Medina García. He was eight times champion of Catalonia in the years 1943, 1945, 1954, 1957, 1958, 1959, 1962 and 1963, and he was runner-up four times, in the years 1946, 1948, 1953 and 1965. He won the Sabadell tournament in 1944 and represented Spain in the Chess Olympiads of 1958 in Munich, and the UEFA European Chess Team in Oberhausen in 1961.
