= Gotthard Backlund =

Swedish chess player

Chess career
- Country: Sweden

Gotthard Backlund was a Swedish chess player.

== Biography ==
Backlund was one of the strongest chess players in Sweden in the 1950s. He played mainly in domestic chess tournaments and Swedish Chess Championships. In 1954, he took part in the international chess match with the USSR national chess team.

Backlund played for Sweden in the Chess Olympiad:

- In 1956, at fourth board in the 12th Chess Olympiad in Moscow (+3, =4, −4).

Backlund participated in chess tournaments until the end of the 1970s.
