= Stefan Witkowski =

Polish chess player (1931–2007)

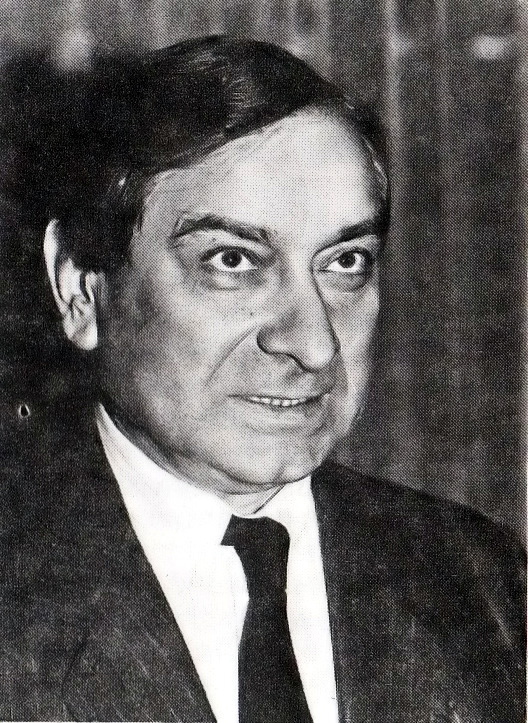
- Witkowski in 1991

Personal information
- Born: 27 September 1931 Łódź, Poland
- Died: 24 October 2007 (aged 76) Warsaw, Poland

Chess career
- Country: Poland
- Title: International Master (1977)

Stefan Witkowski (27 September 1931 – 24 October 2007) was a Polish chess player who won the Polish Chess Championship in 1959. He received the FIDE title of International Master (IM) in 1977.

== Chess career ==
From 1951 to 1979 Stefan Witkowski played eighteen times in the Polish Chess Championship's finals. In 1954 in Łódź he shared first place with Bogdan Śliwa, but lost additional match and won the silver medal. In 1959 Witkowski reached the Polish champion title after the victory in additional match with Józef Gromek - 4:0. In 1955 he made his debut on the international stage. Tournament in Ljubljana he ended in the middle of the table, but won Grandmaster Vasja Pirc in his chess opening - Pirc Defence. Witkowski represented his country in nineteen matches and more than thirty international tournaments. The best results are achieved in the years: 1976 (Hradec Králové - second place ) and 1977 (Lublin - third place) where he was awarded the International Master (IM) title in 1977.

He was a multiple medalist in Polish Team Chess Championship, including eleven gold.

Stefan Witkowski played for Poland in Chess Olympiads:

- In 1958, at fourth board in the 13th Chess Olympiad in Munich (+6, =2, -4).
