= Laura Lorson =

Laura Lorson is public radio producer and host residing in Perry, Kansas.

A native of Louisville, Kentucky, Lorson graduated from the University of Kansas in Lawrence, Kansas in 1989. She began working in radio in 1990 and worked for National Public Radio in Washington, D.C. throughout most of the 1990s as a director, producer, and editor for Talk of the Nation, All Things Considered, and the former NPR show Anthem. Lorson has contributed numerous items during her career, but will likely be best remembered for the December 2004 NPR segment "The Frozen Thing". Laura appeared on Jeopardy! during its 31st season, winning twice.

Lorson returned to Kansas in 2000 where she is now a local All Things Considered host and a director, producer and editor for Kansas Public Radio.
