= Olavi Katajisto =

Finnish chess player (1916–?)

Personal information
- Born: 30 June 1916
- Died: 10 September 2004 (aged 88)

Chess career
- Country: Finland

Olavi Katajisto (30 June 1916 – 10 September 2004) was a Finnish chess player.

In the 1950s Olavi Katajisto was one of Finland's leading chess players. He played mainly in domestic chess tournaments and Finnish Chess Championships. In 1951, Olavi Katajisto won Helsinki Chess Championship.

Olavi Katajisto played for Finland in the Chess Olympiad: In 1954, at third board in the 11th Chess Olympiad in Amsterdam (+5, =6, -5).
