= Bäcklund (surname) =

Bäcklund is a Swedish-language surname.

== Geographical distribution ==
As of 2014, 81.1% of all known bearers of the surname Bäcklund were residents of Sweden (frequency 1:5,653), 15.0% of Finland (1:17,018), 1.6% of Norway (1:151,246) and 1.2% of Denmark (1:217,098).

In Sweden, the frequency of the surname was higher than national average (1:5,653) in the following counties:

1. Västerbotten County (1:1,145)
2. Värmland County (1:1,825)
3. Norrbotten County (1:1,991)
4. Dalarna County (1:3,216)
5. Västmanland County (1:4,323)
6. Västernorrland County (1:4,784)
7. Gävleborg County (1:5,092)
8. Örebro County (1:5,282)

In Finland, the frequency of the surname was higher than national average (1:17,018) in the following regions:

1. Åland (1:2,153)
2. Ostrobothnia (1:3,476)
3. Uusimaa (1:10,324)
4. Southwest Finland (1:11,584)
5. South Karelia (1:12,619)
6. Tavastia Proper (1:13,928)

== People ==
- Albert Victor Bäcklund (1845–1922), Swedish mathematician and physicist
- Magnus Bäcklund (1866–1903), Swedish missionary to Chinese Turkestan
- Magnus Bäcklund (born 1965), Swedish singer
