= Harald Enevoldsen =

Danish chess player

Personal information
- Born: 27 January 1911 Aalborg, Denmark
- Died: 2005

Chess career
- Country: Denmark

Harald Enevoldsen (27 January 1911 – 2005), was a Danish chess player, and Danish Chess Championship silver medalist (1951).

== Biography ==
In the 1950s Harald Enevoldsen was one of the strongest Danish chess players. In 1951, in Danish Chess Championships he shared 1st place with Eigil Pedersen but lost additional match for champion's title.

Harald Enevoldsen played for Denmark in the Chess Olympiads:

- In 1952, at first reserve board in the 10th Chess Olympiad in Helsinki (+2, =2, -6),
- In 1954, at first reserve board in the 11th Chess Olympiad in Amsterdam (+2, =4, -3),
- In 1958, at second reserve board in the 13th Chess Olympiad in Munich (+2, =3, -2).
