= Jonas Hällström =

Swedish philatelist

Jonas Hällström (born 15 February 1972) is a Swedish philatelist who is the current editor-in-chief of Fakes Forgeries Experts. He is a Lieutenant colonel (retired) in the Swedish Armed Forces and works for SAAB Security and Defense Solutions. Hällström's main philatelic interests are in topical philately and he is chairman of the Thematic Commission of the Fédération Internationale de Philatélie.

In April 2016, it was announced that Hällström would be invited to sign the Roll of Distinguished Philatelists.
