= Józef Gromek =

Polish chess player (1931–1985)

Personal information
- Born: 20 April 1931 Ostrowiec Świętokrzyski, Poland
- Died: 19 April 1985 (aged 53) Poland

Chess career
- Country: Poland
- Title: FIDE Master (1984)
- FIDE rating: 2285 (July 1985)
- Peak rating: 2370 (January 1978)

Józef Gromek (20 April 1931 – 19 April 1985) was a Polish chess player who won the Polish Chess Championship in 1955.

== Chess career ==
Józef Gromek graduated from the Faculty of Philosophy at the Catholic University of Lublin. From 1954 to 1970, he played in the Polish Chess Championship's finals seven times, winning the tournament in 1955 in Wrocław. In 1959, in Łódź, Józef Gromek was able to repeat this success but lost an additional match for first place to Stefan Witkowski - 0:4. In 1962/63, Józef Gromek won the New Year tournament in Lublin, ahead of Polish masters Kazimierz Plater and Bogdan Śliwa.

Józef Gromek played for Poland in the Chess Olympiad:

- in 1956, at the fourth board in the 12th Chess Olympiad in Moscow (+8, =0, -6).

Józef Gromek played in an attacking, combinatorial style. He died from a heart attack during a game of fast chess.
