= Gerhard Lorson =

German chess player

Personal information
- Born: 1919
- Died: 1992 (aged 72–73)

Chess career
- Country: Germany; Saar Protectorate; Germany

Gerhard Lorson (1919 – 1992) was a German chess player.

== Biography ==
Gerhard Lorson was two-time chess champion of the Saar during the years of independence (1947–1956). In 1953, he participated in West Germany Chess Championship. In 1955, Gerhard Lorson participated in the Saar chess team match against Switzerland.

Gerhard Lorson played for Saar in the Chess Olympiad:

- In 1952, at first board in the 10th Chess Olympiad in Helsinki (+4, =0, -9),
- In 1954, at second board in the 11th Chess Olympiad in Amsterdam (+3, =7, -8),
- In 1956, at second board in the 12th Chess Olympiad in Moscow (+4, =6, -5).
