= Otto Birger Morcken =

Norwegian chess player

Personal information
- Born: 11 October 1910 Bergen, Norway
- Died: 17 January 2009 (aged 98)

Chess career
- Country: Norway

Otto Birger Morcken (11 October 1910 – 17 January 2009) was a Norwegian chess player, Norwegian Chess Championship winner (1956).

== Biography ==
In the 1950s, Otto Birger Morcken was one of the leading Norwegian chess players. In 1956, he won Norwegian Chess Championship.

Otto Birger Morcken played for Norway in the Chess Olympiads:

- In 1950, at third board in the 9th Chess Olympiad in Dubrovnik (+1, =6, -6),
- In 1952, at third board in the 10th Chess Olympiad in Helsinki (+1, =2, -5),
- In 1954, at first board in the 11th Chess Olympiad in Amsterdam (+2, =5, -6),
- In 1956, at second board in the 12th Chess Olympiad in Moscow (+3, =5, -5).
