= Bela Soos =

Personal information
- Born: 2 March 1930 Târgu Mureș, Romania
- Died: 12 September 2007 (aged 77) Frankfurt, Germany

Chess career
- Country: Romania (1930–1974), Germany (1974–2007)
- Title: International Master (1967)
- Peak rating: 2440 (July 1971)
- Peak ranking: No. 166 (July 1971)

Bela Soos (Hungarian: Soós Béla; 6 March 1930 in Târgu Mureș – 12 September 2007 in Frankfurt) was a Romanian chess player of Hungarian descent who was awarded the title of International Master in 1967. As a youth, he was a football player, representing Dinamo Bucharest during his military service. He represented Romania in 4 chess olympiads in 1956, 1962, 1966 and 1968, before defecting to West Germany in the early 1970s. Following his defection, all further mention of him was suppressed in Romanian publications. He is noted for two wins over leading Soviet grandmaster Efim Geller, including a crushing win in 23 moves at the 1962 olympiad in Varna, Bulgaria.
