= Ioannis Anagnostou =

Greek chess player

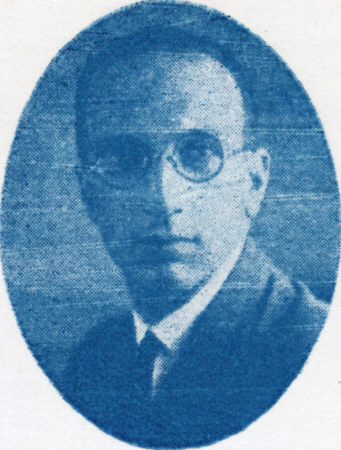

Chess career
- Country: Greece

Ioannis Anagnostou (Greek: Ιωάννης Αναγνώστου) was a Greek chess player.

== Biography ==
In the mid-1950s Ioannis Anagnostou was a leading Greek chess player. He played mainly in domestic chess tournaments and Greek Chess Championships.

Ioannis Anagnostou played for Greece in the Chess Olympiads:

- In 1952, at fourth board in the 10th Chess Olympiad in Helsinki (+0, =3, -3),
- In 1954, at second reserve board in the 11th Chess Olympiad in Amsterdam (+3, =7, -8).
