= Jorma Vesterinen =

Finnish chess player (1918–?)

Personal information
- Born: 11 June 1918
- Died: 20 June 1980 (aged 62)

Chess career
- Country: Finland
- Years active: 1940s - 1950s

Jorma Vesterinen (11 June 1918 – 20 June 1980) was a Finnish chess player, two-time Finnish Chess Championship medalist (1949, 1950).

From the late 1940s to the mid-1950s, Jorma Vesterinen was one of Finland's leading chess players. In Finnish Chess Championships he has won two bronze (1949, 1950) medals.

Jorma Vesterinen played for Finland in the Chess Olympiad: In 1954, at second board in the 11th Chess Olympiad in Amsterdam (+3, =10, -5).
