= Bechir Kchouk =

Tunisian chess player

Personal information
- Born: 1924 Tunis, Tunisia
- Died: 1983 (aged 58–59) Tunis, Tunisia

Chess career
- Country: Tunisia

Bechir Kchouk (1924-1983) was a Tunisian chess player.

== Chess career ==
From the end of 1950s to the end of 1970s, Bechir Kchouk was one of the leading Tunisian chess players.

Bechir Kchouk played for Tunisia in the Chess Olympiads:

- In 1958, at third board in the 13th Chess Olympiad in Munich (+6, =4, -6),
- In 1960, at first reserve board in the 14th Chess Olympiad in Leipzig (+3, =9, -4),
- In 1962, at third board in the 15th Chess Olympiad in Varna (+3, =4, -6),
- In 1966, at third board in the 17th Chess Olympiad in Havana (+6, =6, -5),
- In 1968, at third board in the 18th Chess Olympiad in Lugano (+3, =4, -7),
- In 1970, at third board in the 19th Chess Olympiad in Siegen (+3, =3, -9),
- In 1972, at second board in the 20th Chess Olympiad in Skopje (+3, =6, -7),
- In 1978, at fourth board in the 23rd Chess Olympiad in Buenos Aires (+1, =1, -6).

Bechir Kchouk played for Tunisia in the European Team Chess Championship preliminaries:

- In 1973, at third board in the 5th European Team Chess Championship preliminaries (+1, =0, -1).
