= Leo Hällström =

Finnish chess player

Personal information
- Born: 16 June 1936 Terijoki, Finland
- Died: 10 April 2014 (aged 77)

Chess career
- Country: Finland

Leo Hällström (16 June 1936 – 10 April 2014) was a Finnish chess player.

== Biography ==
In the end of 1950s and begin of 1960s, Leo Hällström was one of Finland's leading young chess players. In 1955, he won first Finnish Junior Chess Championship. In 1955, in Antwerp Leo Hällström participated in 3rd World Junior Chess Championship and ranked in 8th place. He four time participated in Finnish Chess Championships (1956, 1958, 1959, 1960). His best result in this tournament was 5th place in 1956 and 1958. In 1956, in Hanko Leo Hällström participated in International Chess Tournament. He three times played for Finland in friendly matches against Estonia (1959, 1960, 1961). In 1960, Leo Hällström was awarded the title of National Chess Master.

Leo Hällström played for Finland in the Chess Olympiad:

- In 1958, at second reserve board in the 13th Chess Olympiad in Munich (+3, =4, -3).

Leo Hällström played for Finland in the European Team Chess Championship preliminaries:

- In 1961, at eighth board in the 2nd European Team Chess Championship preliminaries (+0, =0, -4).
