= Mary Jeanne Hallstrom =

American nurse and politician

Mary Jeanne "Dolly" Hallstrom (December 26, 1924 – August 2, 2006) was an American nurse and politician.

Born in East Orange, New Jersey, Hallstrom went to Loyola University Chicago and had nursing training at St. Mary's Hospital in Evanston, Illinois. Hallstrom served in the Illinois House of Representatives from 1979 to 1983 and was a Republican. She then served on the Illinois Human Rights Commission. Hallstrom died in Evanston, Illinois.
