= Radko Bobekov =

Bulgarian chess player

Personal information
- Born: 7 October 1928
- Died: 19 October 1993 (aged 65)

Chess career
- Country: Bulgaria

Radko Bobekov (Bulgarian: Радко Бобеков; 7 October 1928 – 19 October 1993) was a Bulgarian chess player.

== Biography ==
In the 1950s and 1960s Radko Bobekov was one of the leading Bulgarian chess players. He has participated in the Bulgarian Chess Championship finals many times (1953, 1957, 1963, 1967). In 1958, in Sofia Radko Bobekov shared 1st - 3rd place in International Chess Tournament.

Radko Bobekov played for Bulgaria in the Chess Olympiad:

- In 1954, at second reserve board in the 11th Chess Olympiad in Amsterdam (+5, =1, -5).

Radko Bobekov played for Bulgaria in the European Team Chess Championship preliminaries:

- In 1961, at reserve board in the 2nd European Team Chess Championship (+0, =1, -0),
- In 1970, at reserve board in the 4th European Team Chess Championship (+0, =0, -1).

Radko Bobekov played for Bulgaria in the World Student Team Chess Championship:

- In 1956, at second reserve board in the 3rd World Student Team Chess Championship in Uppsala (+1, =0, -2).
