= Lennart Ljungqvist =

Swedish chess player (1931–1991)

Personal information
- Born: 5 September 1931
- Died: 1991

Chess career
- Country: Sweden

Lennart Ljungqvist (5 September 1931 – 1991) was a Swedish chess player, Chess Olympiad individual medalist (1956).

== Biography ==
Lennart Ljungqvist was multiple participant in Swedish Chess Championships (1962, 1968, 1969, 1970, 1971, 1973, 1974). In 1961, in Mariánské Lázně he participated in FIDE European Zonal tournament.

Lennart Ljungqvist played for Sweden in the Chess Olympiads:

- In 1956, at second reserve board in the 12th Chess Olympiad in Moscow (+6, =2, -2) and won individual silver medal.

Lennart Ljungqvist played for Sweden in the European Team Chess Championship preliminaries:

- In 1970, at eight board in the 4th European Team Chess Championship preliminaries (+1, =3, -2).

Lennart Ljungqvist played for Sweden in the Nordic Chess Cup:

- In 1970, at sixth board (+0, =1, -2) and won team silver medal.

Lennart Ljungqvist played for Sweden in the World Student Team Chess Championships:

- In 1954, at second board in the 1st World Student Team Chess Championship in Oslo (+1, =1, -4),
- In 1955, at second board in the 2nd World Student Team Chess Championship in Lyon (+1, =0, -7).
