= Thor Støre =

Norwegian politician (1924–2001)

Thor Støre (5 February 1924 – 7 May 2001) was a Norwegian politician for the Liberal Party. He served in the position of deputy representative to the Norwegian Parliament from Oslo during the term 1969–1973.

Støre was a chess columnist for Dagbladet for many years. He was fired from Dagbladet in 1986 following a controversy over a column he had written commemorating the 1936 unofficial Chess Olympiad in Munich. For context, in the 1930s, Norwegian sports was still divided between the labour movement's organizations and the politically neutral (conservative) ones. The Workers Federation of Sports boycotted the whole Olympics, including the unofficial Chess Olympiad, whereas the Confederation of Sports athletes and chess players took part. Commenting on the situation in his Dagbladet chess column 50 years later, Støre wrote: "There is no essential difference between conservatives and Nazis, it's just a matter of degrees."

"There is no essential difference between conservatives and nazis, it's just a matter of degrees."

— Thor Støre, Dagbladet chess column, 1986

The ensuing row in Norwegian journalistic and chess circles mainly took place behind the scenes, enabling Dagbladet to swiftly and discreetly find a replacement to take over the chess column, and give Støre his notice. The scandal only came to the attention of a somewhat wider audience 25 years later, ten years after Støre had died, when the story was told by Atle Grønn in his chess column in the newspaper Dag og Tid.

== Selected works ==
- Århundrets sjakk-kamp: Verdensmesterskapet Fischer – Spasski parti for parti ("Chess Match of the Century: The World Championship Fischer — Spassky game by game") (1973), on the Fischer–Spassky (1972 match)
