= Bobkov =

Bobkov (Russian: Бобков) is a Russian surname that has been borne by, among others:

- Igor Bobkov (b. 1991), ice hockey player
- Nikolai Bobkov (b. 1940), footballer
- Philipp Bobkov (1925–2019), KGB official
- Sergey Bobkov (b. 1961), mathematician
