= Carlos Jáuregui (chess player) =

Chilean-Canadian chess master

Carlos Jauregui Andrade (14 September 1932 – March 8, 2013) was a Chilean–Canadian chess master.

In 1953, he took 18th in Mar del Plata (Svetozar Gligorić won). In 1954, he took 22nd in Mar del Plata/Buenos Aires (zonal; Oscar Panno won). In 1959, he took 8th in Lima (Borislav Ivkov and Ludek Pachman won). In 1959, he tied for 7–8th in Santiago de Chile (Ivkov and Pachman won), and beat Bobby Fischer in their individual game there.

Jauregui played for Chile in two Chess Olympiads at Moscow 1956 and Tel Aviv 1964. He also represented Chile in 1st Panamerican Chess Team Championship at Tucuman 1971, where he had best individual result on reserve board (equal with Samuel Schweber of Argentina and Hernández of Cuba).

Born in Santiago, Chile, in the mid-1970s he moved to the Canadian province of Nova Scotia. In 1977, he was Atlantic Champion. He played in the Canadian Chess Championships in 1978, 1981 and 1987. He died March 8, 2013, in Milan, Italy.
