= Morson =

Morson is a surname. Notable people with the surname include:

- Albert Clifford Morson (1881–1975), British surgeon
- Gary Saul Morson (born 1948), American literary critic
- Georgiana Morson, British social reformer
- Walter Morson (1851–1921), Canadian lawyer and politician

== See also ==
- Lorson
- Morton (surname)
