= Per Ofstad =

Norwegian chess player

Personal information
- Born: 27 November 1934 (age 91)

Chess career
- Country: Norway
- Title: International Correspondence Chess Master (1997)
- FIDE rating: 2010 (December 2019)
- Peak rating: 2235 (January 2004)
- ICCF rating: 2445 (July 1998)

Per Ofstad (born 27 November 1934) is a Norwegian chess player, Norwegian Chess Championship winner (1961).

== Biography ==
From the early 1960s to the mid-1980s Per Ofstad was one of the leading Norwegian chess players. In 1961, in Sandefjord he won Norwegian Chess Championship. In 1963, Per Ofstad together with Svein Johannessen represented Norway in World Chess Championship Zonal Tournament.

Per Ofstad played for Norway in the Chess Olympiad:

- In 1958, at third board in the 13th Chess Olympiad in Munich (+6, =5, -4).

Per Ofstad played for Norway in the World Student Team Chess Championships:

- In 1954, at second board in the 1st World Student Team Chess Championship in Oslo (+1, =4, -4),
- In 1955, at third board in the 2nd World Student Team Chess Championship in Lyon (+5, =3, -3).

Per Ofstad played for Norway in the Nordic Chess Cup:

- In 1975, at fourth board in the 6th Nordic Chess Cup in Hindås (+2, =1, -2).

From 1996 to 2019 Per Ofstad regularly participated in European and World Chess Senior Tournaments. From 1998 to 2001 he was the President of the Norwegian Chess Federation.
