= Agdestein =

Agdestein is a Norwegian surname. People with this surname include:

- Espen Agdestein (born 1965), Norwegian entrepreneur and chess player
- Marianne Aasen Agdestein (born 1967), Norwegian politician
- Simen Agdestein (born 1967), Norwegian chess grandmaster and footballer
- Torbjørn Agdestein (born 1991), Norwegian footballer
