= Kristian Stuvik Holm =

Norwegian chess grandmaster (born 1998)

Personal information
- Born: February 16, 1998 (age 28) Hamar, Norway

Chess career
- Country: Norway
- Title: Grandmaster (2025)
- FIDE rating: 2500 (August 2026)
- Peak rating: 2503 (June 2025)

Kristian Stuvik Holm is a Norwegian chess grandmaster.

== Chess career ==
In 2018, he played for the Oslo Trolls in the 2018 PRO Chess League season.

In July 2021, he won the Norwegian Chess Championship ahead of grandmaster Jon Ludvig Hammer.

In July 2023, he finished 6th in the Norwegian Chess Championship. In the last round of the tournament, he held his Vålerenga club teammate and grandmaster Evgeny Romanov to a draw, which prevented Romanov from winning the overall championship.

In February 2025, he met all of the requirements to become a Grandmaster after surpassing 2500 rating. He was later officially awarded the title in April.
