= Aksel Bu Kvaløy =

Norwegian chess grandmaster (born 2008)

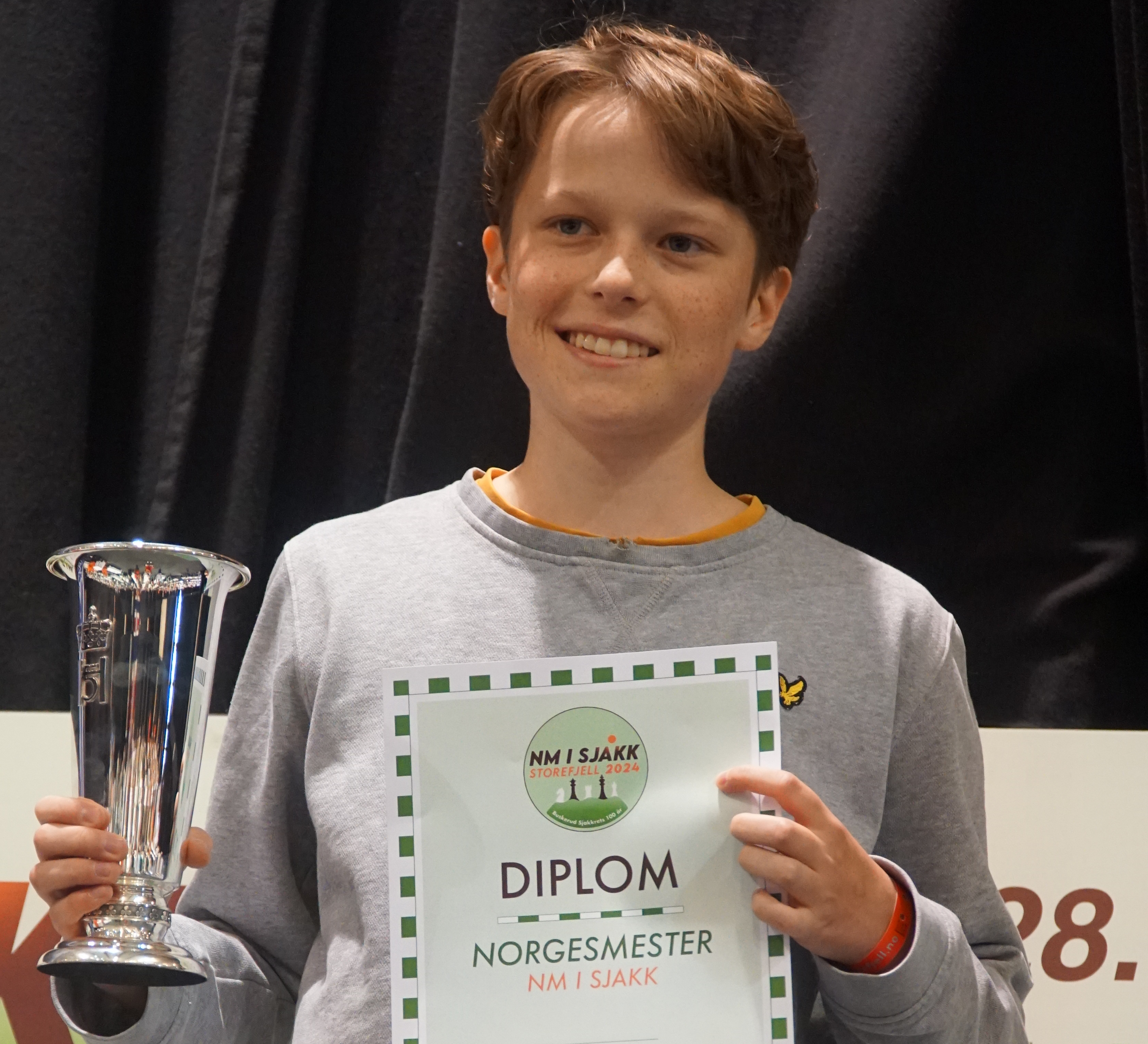
- Kvaløy in July 2024

Personal information
- Born: August 12, 2008 (age 18) Stavanger, Norway

Chess career
- Country: Norway
- Title: Grandmaster (2025)
- FIDE rating: 2505 (September 2026)
- Peak rating: 2515 (October 2026)

Aksel Bu Kvaløy is a Norwegian chess grandmaster.

== Chess career ==
In July 2024, he won the Norwegian Chess Championship at the age of 15, following in the feats of Simen Agdestein and Magnus Carlsen. Kvaløy was undefeated in the tournament and won by having a better tiebreak score than Frode Urkedal. He also earned his second GM norm at the tournament.

In July 2025, he earned his final GM norm after finishing in second place at the Norwegian Chess Championship, becoming Norway's 20th grandmaster.

== See also ==
- Norwegian Chess Championship
- List of chess grandmasters
