= Konrad Salbu =

Norwegian chess player (1903–1986)

Personal information
- Born: 10 September 1903 Bergen
- Died: 1986

Chess career
- Country: Norway

Konrad Johan Harbo Salbu (1903–1986) was a Norwegian chess player, Norwegian Chess Championship silver medalist (1937).

== Biography ==
Konrad Salbu lived in Bergen for almost his entire life, but spent some years in Stavanger as a manager of a company. In 1935, Konrad Salbu won Norwegian Blitz Chess Championship. In 1937, in Trondheim he won silver medal in Norwegian Chess Championship (tournament won Arne Kroghdahl). Konrad Salbu was in the Norwegian national team at the 7th Chess Olympiad in Stockholm, where he played 15 games (+6, =3, -6).

Konrad Salbu played for Norway in the unofficial Chess Olympiad:

- In 1936, at first reserve board in the 3rd unofficial Chess Olympiad in Munich (+7, =4, -6).
