= 1973 in chess =

Events in chess in 1973:

== Top players ==
FIDE top 10 by Elo rating - January 1973

1. Bobby Fischer United States 2780
2. Mikhail Tal Soviet Union 2660
3. Anatoly Karpov Soviet Union 2660
4. Boris Spassky Soviet Union 2655
5. Viktor Korchnoi Soviet Union 2650
6. Lajos Portisch Hungary 2650
7. Tigran Petrosian Soviet Union 2640
8. Mikhail Botvinnik Soviet Union 2630
9. Lev Polugaevsky Soviet Union 2625
10. Bent Larsen Denmark 2620

== Chess news in brief ==
- For the first time, the Interzonal phase of the new world championship cycle is expanded to fill two tournaments, as FIDE are determined to make more places available to zonal qualifiers. Viktor Korchnoi and Anatoly Karpov dominate the Leningrad Interzonal, each scoring 13½/17, ahead of Robert Byrne on 12½/17. Surprisingly, Brazilian newcomer Henrique Mecking steals the show at the Petropolis Interzonal, with 12/17, ahead of established players Efim Geller, Lev Polugaevsky and Lajos Portisch (all 11½/17). A play-off is held in Portorož to determine the Petropolis second and third qualifying places and Geller is eliminated.
- The final stage of the European Team Chess Championship is held at City Hall, Bath. Seven of the twenty-four teams that contested the preliminaries join the reigning champions (the USSR) in the final. Tragically, grandmaster Leonid Stein dies suddenly of a heart attack the evening before the Soviet team sets off. Nevertheless, the USSR go on to take the gold medal with 40½/56. Yugoslavia narrowly capture the silver medals with 34/56, ahead of Hungary (33/56). Efim Geller scores 90% to be the best individual performer. Despite being one of the world's top 20 grandmasters, he is playing on board seven and for the most part, faces relatively weak opposition. Seven of the Soviet ten-man squad take home individual gold medals, such is their dominance of the event. Most countries send their best players, with the exception of West Germany, who are missing Robert Hübner and Klaus Darga.
- Former world champion Mikhail Tal is the winner of several important tournaments. At Sochi, with 11/15, he outperforms recently deposed world champion Boris Spassky, (10/15) and Jan Smejkal (9/15). At Wijk aan Zee, he wins with 10½/15, ahead of Yuri Balashov (10/15) and at Dubna, shares the honours with Ratmir Kholmov (both 11/15). With further successes at Tallinn and Hastings (1973/74 edition), he may be in the best form of his career. Between July 1972 and April 1973 he plays 86 games without defeat, winning 47 and drawing 39.
- Boris Spassky comes back from his disappointment of 1972, to win the 41st Soviet Championship, a full point ahead of the USSR's other leading players. In an effort to re-establish the USSR's supremacy at the top of world chess, their federation officials, led by Viktor Baturinsky, decide to get 'tough' on the players. Those wishing to play abroad next year are ordered to take part in the national championship. Short draws are outlawed and the players encouraged to be more ruthless and serious in their future endeavours. In the context of a previous disagreement between Spassky and Baturinsky, insiders interpret the new doctrine as an ill-fated attempt to expose Spassky as the weakness in the camp.
- A strong double round robin tournament (also known as 2nd AVRO) to celebrate 50 years of sponsor AVRO (a broadcasting society) and 100 years of organizer KNVB (the Royal Dutch Chess Association) is held at Hilversum, where AVRO is settled. László Szabó (who had achieved his first big international tournament victory already at the 1938/39 Hastings congress ahead of Euwe) and Efim Geller share first place with 9½/14, ahead of Ljubomir Ljubojević on 8½/14 and Ulf Andersson. Pre-tournament favourite Lev Polugaevsky, was coming in as shared fifth. Dutch rising star Jan Timman finished eight and last.
- Anatoly Karpov continues his rapid rise in the rankings, winning a Category 12 event at Madrid with 11/15, ahead of Vladimir Tukmakov (10½/15) and Semyon Furman (10/15).
- At Las Palmas, Tigran Petrosian and Leonid Stein share victory with 9½/15. Petrosian also succeeds at Amsterdam, this time shared with Albin Planinc (both 10/15), ahead of Lubomir Kavalek (9½/15).
- Efim Geller wins a strong tournament in Budapest with 10½/15, ahead of Anatoly Karpov (9½/15).
- Alexander Beliavsky (8½/11) fights off the twin challenge of Tony Miles (8/11) and Michael Stean (7½/11), to win the World Junior Championship in Teesside. Beliavsky loses both individual games to the Englishmen, but deals more ruthlessly with the tournament tail-enders.
- At the Hungarian Championship, held in Budapest, there is a three-way tie for first place between Andras Adorjan, István Csom and Zoltán Ribli (all 10/15).
- The first World Open chess tournament is held in New York City on June 30 - July 4, and is won by Walter Browne with a 9-1 score. 725 players participate in the event, which has a $15,000 prize fund.
- Having missed out on their bid to host the 1972 Fischer-Spassky match, organisers in Dortmund remain upbeat and arrange a tournament at Westfalenpark. It results in a three-way tie for first place, between Hans-Joachim Hecht, Ulf Andersson and Boris Spassky. The event doubles as the second Open German Championship and becomes the catalyst for a new series of annual events, known as the Dortmunder Schachtage.
- Bent Larsen wins the Manila tournament with 12½/15, from Ljubomir Ljubojević (11½/15) and Lubomir Kavalek (10½/15).
- At Tbilisi, IM Roman Dzindzichashvili shows he is comfortable in grandmaster company, sharing victory with Rafael Vaganian (both 11½/17), ahead of Evgeny Vasiukov (10½/17), Semyon Furman, David Bronstein, Eduard Gufeld and other established masters.
- London plays host to the Guardian Royal Exchange (GRE) tournament. In the Masters section, Jan Timman takes first (7/9) from Raymond Keene (5½/9), Samuel Reshevsky and Hans-Joachim Hecht (both 5/9). In the Masters Reserves section, John Nunn wins with 7/9.
- Georgy Tringov and Bruno Parma (both 9/14) fight off the challenge of fellow grandmasters Hans-Joachim Hecht, Ivan Radulov and Dragoljub Velimirovic (all 8½/14) at the biannual tournament Bora Kostic Memorial in Vršac. Pre-tournament favourite, Wolfgang Uhlmann finishes mid-table.
- Bent Larsen wins the Scandinavian Championship, held in Grenaa, Denmark, with 9/11. The 13,000 D Kr. prize fund attracts 111 entries. Larsen's share of the prize money amounts to 6,000 D. Kr. (about £420).
- Following William Hartston's 4½-1½ play-off win against Michael Basman in the British Championship, he and Jana Hartston become the first husband and wife pair to simultaneously hold men's and women's national championship titles.

== Births ==
- Joël Lautier, a leading French GM, once a regular player on the elite tournament circuit - April 12
- Vladislav Tkachiev, Soviet-French GM, former European Individual Champion - November 9
- Sergei Tiviakov, Soviet-Dutch GM, former Dutch Champion - February 14
- Peter Heine Nielsen, Danish GM, former highest rated Nordic player - May 24
- Aleksej Aleksandrov, Belarusian GM, former national and European junior champion - May 11
- Peng Xiaomin, Chinese GM, former national champion - April 8
- Jacob Aagaard, Danish-Scottish GM, former British champion - July 31
- José González García, Mexican GM - August 12
- Stanislav Kriventsov, Soviet-Canadian IM, a chess coach and world series poker player - November 2
- Frode Elsness, Norwegian IM, 2008 Norwegian Champion - June 15

== Deaths ==
- Leonid Stein, a leading Soviet GM and former world championship candidate - July 4
- Vasily Panov, Soviet IM, renowned as a theoretician, writer and journalist - January 13
- Hans Kmoch, Austrian IM, chess writer and occasional second to Alekhine - February 13
- Folke Rogard, Swedish lawyer and former President of FIDE - June 11
- Braslav Rabar, Croatian IM, former national champion, writer and theoretician - December 6
- Al Horowitz, American IM, renowned writer and chess columnist - January 18
- Manuel Golmayo Torriente, Cuban-Spanish master and International Arbiter - March 7
- Alexandru Tyroler, Hungarian-Romanian master, winner of first Romanian Championship - February 3
- Markas Luckis, Lithuanian-Argentine master, Olympiad medal winner - February 9
