= Ragnar Hoen =

Norwegian chess player (1940–2019)

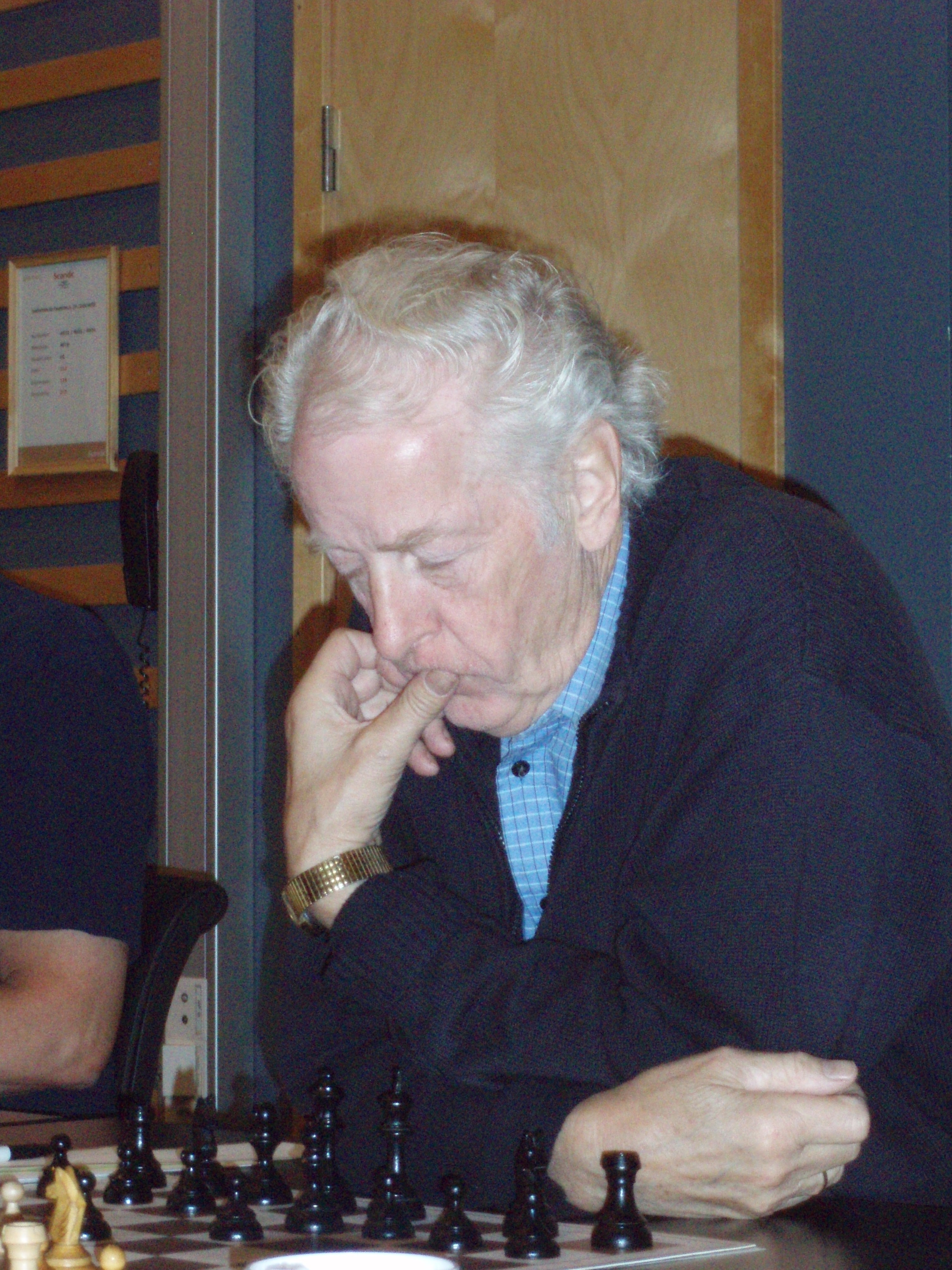
- Ragnar Hoen in 2007

Personal information
- Born: 5 October 1940 Oslo, Norway
- Died: 6 July 2019 (aged 78)

Chess career
- Country: Norway
- Title: FIDE Master (1981)
- Peak rating: 2395 (January 1979)

Ragnar Hoen (5 October 1940 – 6 July 2019) was a Norwegian chess FIDE Master (FM), three-time Norwegian Chess Championship winner (1963, 1978, 1981), and Nordic Chess Championship winner (1967).

== Biography ==
Hoen represented the club Oslo Schakselskap. From the early 1960s to the mid-1980s, Ragnar Hoen was one of the leading Norwegian chess players. He won Norwegian Chess Championships three times: 1963, 1978, and 1981. In the championship in 1981, Ragnar Hoen shared first place with three other players but was the only one who accepted a rematch and thus won the championship. He also won the Nordic Chess Championship in 1967. Ragnar Hoen won the Norwegian Blitz Chess Championship twice in a row (1980, 1981). He also won the Norwegian Senior Chess Championship (S60) six consecutive times in from 2002 to 2007.

Ragnar Hoen played for Norway in the Chess Olympiads:

- in 1960, at the fourth board in the 14th Chess Olympiad in Leipzig (+7, =7, -4),
- in 1962, at the third board in the 15th Chess Olympiad in Varna (+8, =4, -4),
- in 1964, at the third board in the 16th Chess Olympiad in Tel Aviv (+3, =8, -5),
- in 1966, at the third board in the 17th Chess Olympiad in Havana (+6, =5, -5),
- in 1968, at the second board in the 18th Chess Olympiad in Lugano (+3, =3, -4),
- in 1970, at the second board in the 19th Chess Olympiad in Siegen (+5, =4, -6),
- in 1972, at the fourth board in the 20th Chess Olympiad in Skopje (+6, =3, -2),
- in 1974, at the fourth board in the 21st Chess Olympiad in Nice (+3, =7, -6),
- in 1976, at the second board in the 22nd Chess Olympiad in Haifa (+4, =6, -1),
- in 1978, at the fourth board in the 23rd Chess Olympiad in Buenos Aires (+3, =7, -2),
- in 1980, at the third board in the 24th Chess Olympiad in La Valletta (+2, =6, -2),
- in 1982, at the second reserve board in the 25th Chess Olympiad in Lucerne (+1, =4, -3).

Ragnar Hoen played for Norway in the European Team Chess Championship:

- in 1989, at the first reserve board in the 9th European Team Chess Championship in Haifa (+2, =2, -1).

Ragnar Hoen also played for Norway in the Nordic Chess Cup five times (1970, 1972, 1977, 1985, 1987) and won gold (1987) and bronze (1970) medals in team competition.

Ragnar Hoen was also known as a chess journalist. He edited a column in the newspaper Vårt Land and a bulletin of the Norwegian Chess Federation. Ragnar Hoen served on the board of Tidemanns Tobakk.

His nephew was Steinar Hoen, a Norwegian high jumper and European Champion in 1994.
