= Arne Zwaig =

Norwegian chess player (1947–2022)

Personal information
- Born: 6 February 1947 Oslo, Norway
- Died: 12 April 2022 (aged 75)

Chess career
- Country: Norway
- Title: International Master (1986)
- Peak rating: 2475 (January 1976)

Arne Zwaig (6 February 1947 – 12 April 2022) was a Norwegian chess player who held the title of International Master. He won the Norwegian Chess Championship in 1964 and 1969.

Zwaig's first participation on the Norwegian Chess Olympiad team was in 1962 where he, as an untitled 15-year-old, held Paul Keres to a draw in an inferior rook endgame. He has since played on the Norwegian team at the Olympiads in 1964, 1966, 1968, 1972, and 1974.

Zwaig was politically active for the radical Socialist People's Party, but was nonetheless a member of the Oslo chess club which featured a mainly conservative patronage at the time. However, Zwaig was unhappy with the Oslo chess club's lack of support for team travelling to the 1966 Olympiad in Havana, and along with Svein Johannessen he broke with the club and became a member of Torshov, before forming a new club "SK Fischer". Zwaig played on these clubs' teams, which won the Norwegian team championships of 1971 (Torshov), 1973, 1975, and 1976 (SK Fischer).

In the early 1970s, when the Norwegian chess federation lacked a magazine, Zwaig led the publication of the chess magazine Patt. The magazine was unprofitable, and closed after a few years (but the chess federation started publishing its own magazine again in 1975). The fifth issue of 1973 contained a controversial interview with Fredrik Fasting Torgersen who was in prison convicted of murder.

Prioritizing his career in the computer business, Zwaig retired from chess in 1977 but made a few limited comebacks in 2000 for the Asker chess club, and in 2005 as an Oslo chess club member.
