= Aage Vestøl =

Norwegian chess player

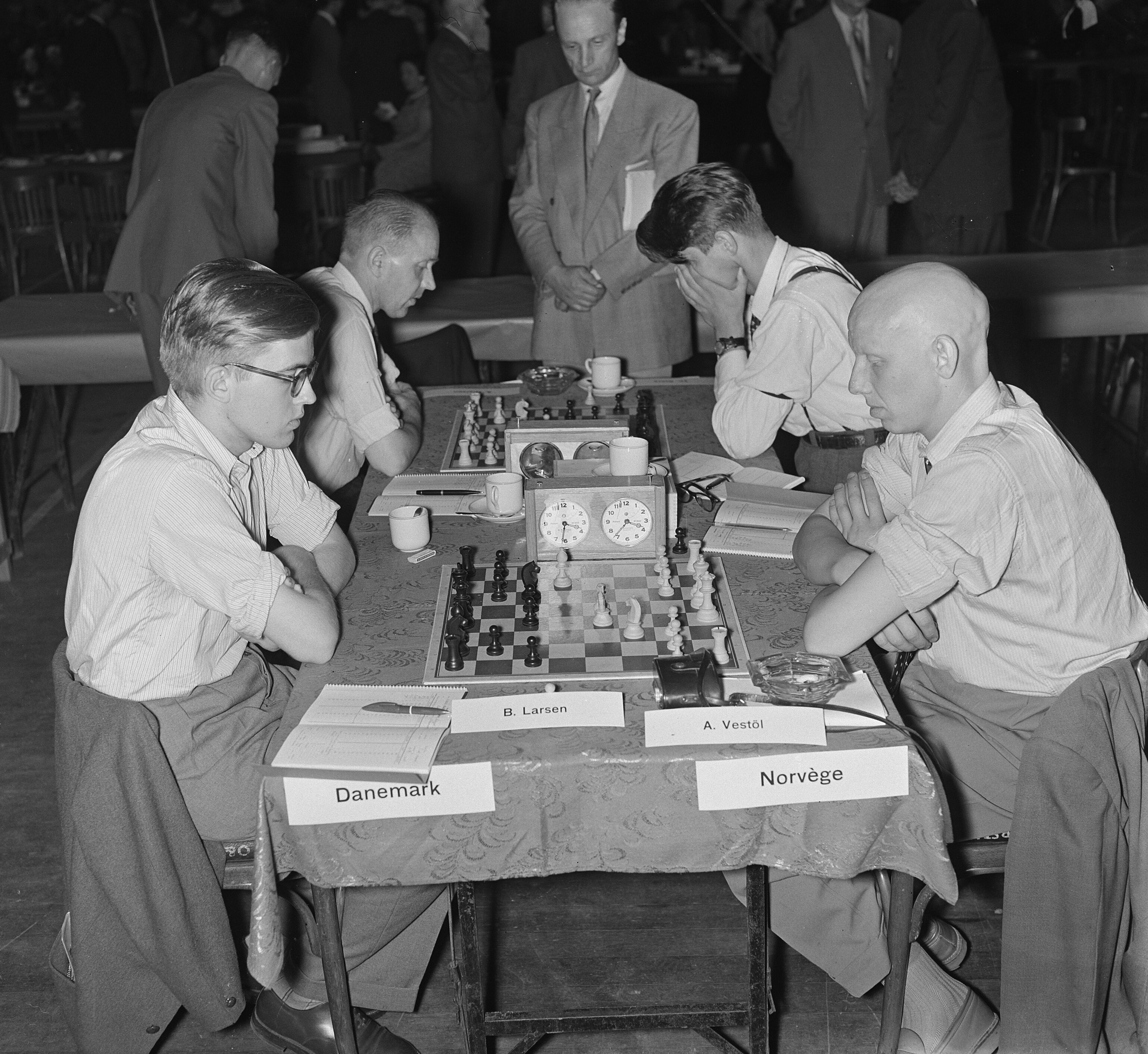
- Bent Larsen vs. Aage Vestøl (11th Chess Olympiad, 1954)

Personal information
- Born: Aage Vestøl; 24 December 1922
- Died: 30 March 2008 (aged 85)

Chess career
- Country: Norway
- Title: Norwegian champion 1949

Aage Vestøl (24 December 1922 – 30 March 2008) was a Norwegian chess player.

Vestøl won the next to the top class at the Norwegian Championships in 1938, and likewise won the next to the top class at the Nordic Championships in 1939. From the end of the Second World War until 1959 Vestøl was Norway's second strongest player, after Olaf Barda. Vestøl became Norwegian Champion in 1949. He represented Norway in the five Chess Olympiads from 1950 to 1958, on the first and second tables.
