= Norway Chess 2023 =

Chess tournament in Stavanger, Norway

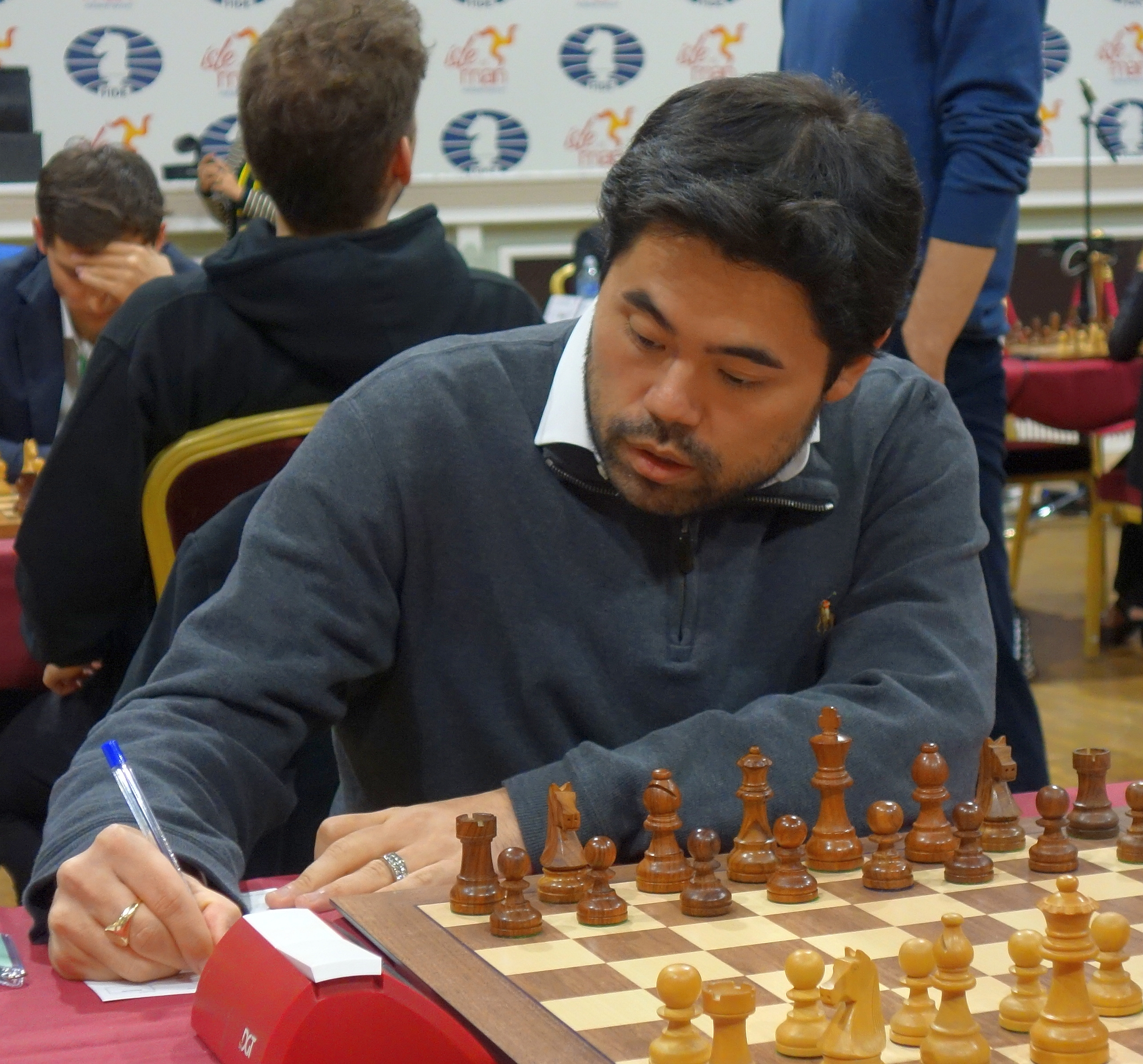
- Tournament winner Hikaru Nakamura

Tournament information
- Sport: Chess
- Location: Stavanger, Norway
- Dates: 29 May–9 June
- Participants: 10 from 7 nations

Final positions
- Champion: Hikaru Nakamura (USA)

Norway Chess 2023 was an 11th edition of Norway Chess, an annual chess tournament, that took place in Stavanger from May 29 to June 9, 2023. It consisted of 10 participants, and used a round-robin system. It was won by Hikaru Nakamura, who defeated tournament leader Fabiano Caruana in last round.

== Organization ==
Tournament consisted of 10 participants, and included a blitz tournament to determine the pairings, won by Nodirbek Abdusattorov, and main classical event. As previous editions since 2019, in case of a draw in a classical game, an armageddon game has to be played. A win in a classical game was rewarded by 3 points, followed by 1.5 points for armageddon victory, 1 point for armageddon loss and 0 points for classical loss.

== Participants ==
Player	Rating	Ranking
Player	May 2023	
(Norway) Magnus Carlsen	2853	1
(France) Alireza Firouzja	2785	4
(United States) Hikaru Nakamura	2775	5
(Netherlands) Anish Giri	2768	6
(United States) Fabiano Caruana	2764	7
(United States) Wesley So	2760	8
(Azerbaijan) Shakhriyar Mamedyarov	2738	16
(India) Gukesh Dommaraju	2732	18
(Uzbekistan) Nodirbek Abdusattorov	2731	19
(Norway) Aryan Tari	2642	>100

== Standings ==
=== Blitz tournament ===
11th Norway Chess Blitz, 29 May 2023, Stavanger, Norway
	Player	Rating	1	2	3	4	5	6	7	8	9	10	Points	H2H	SB	Wins
1	Nodirbek Abdusattorov (Uzbekistan)	2683		½	½	1	1	0	0	1	1	1	6			
2	Alireza Firouzja (France)	2904	½		1	0	0	½	½	1	1	1	5½	1		
3	Shakhriyar Mamedyarov (Azerbaijan)	2704	½	0		1	½	0	1	½	1	1	5½	0		
4	Fabiano Caruana (United States)	2837	0	1	0		½	1	0	½	1	1	5	1½		
5	Wesley So (United States)	2749	0	1	½	½		½	½	½	½	1	5	1		
6	Hikaru Nakamura (United States)	2885	1	½	1	0	½		0	½	1	½	5	½		
7	Magnus Carlsen (Norway)	2852	1	½	0	1	½	1		½	0	0	4½			
8	Anish Giri (Netherlands)	2807	0	0	½	½	½	½	½		1	0	3½			
9	Aryan Tari (Norway)	2571	0	0	0	0	½	0	1	0		1	2½	1		
10	Gukesh Dommaraju (India)	2629	0	0	0	0	0	½	1	1	0		2½	0		

=== Classical tournament ===
11th Norway Chess, 30 May – 9 June 2023, Stavanger, Norway, Category XXI (2755)
	Player	Rating	1	2	3	4	5	6	7	8	9	10	Points	TPR
1	Hikaru Nakamura (United States)	2775		3	3	1½	1	1	1½	1½	1	3	16½	2827
2	Fabiano Caruana (United States)	2764	0		1	1½	1½	3	0	3	3	3	16	2794
3	Gukesh Dommaraju (India)	2732	0	1½		1½	1½	1	1½	3	1½	3	14½	2798
4	Anish Giri (Netherlands)	2768	1	1	1		1½	1	1½	1½	1½	3	13	2794
5	Wesley So (United States)	2760	1½	1	1	1		1	1½	1	3	1½	12½	2795
6	Magnus Carlsen (Norway)	2853	1½	0	1½	1½	1½		1½	1½	1	1½	11½	2744
7	Shakhriyar Mamedyarov (Azerbaijan)	2738	1	3	1	1	1	1		0	1½	1½	11	2757
8	Alireza Firouzja (France)	2785	1	0	0	1	1½	1	3		3	0	10½	2711
9	Nodirbek Abdusattorov (Uzbekistan)	2731	1½	0	1	1	0	1½	1	0		3	9	2676
10	Aryan Tari (Norway)	2642	0	0	0	0	1	1	1	3	0		6	2599
