= Kongshavn =

Kongshavn may refer to:

== People ==
- Kongshavn (surname)

== Places ==
- Kongshavn, Arendal, a village in Arendal Municipality in Agder county, Norway
- Kongshavn, Kristiansand, a neighborhood in Kristiansand Municipality in Agder county, Norway
- Kongshavn, Oslo, a neighborhood in Oslo Municipality in Oslo county, Norway

== Other ==
- MS Kongshavn, the former name of a cruiseferry owned by the Greek-based company Ventouris Ferries
