= Kjetil Aleksander Lie =

Norwegian chess grandmaster (born 1980)

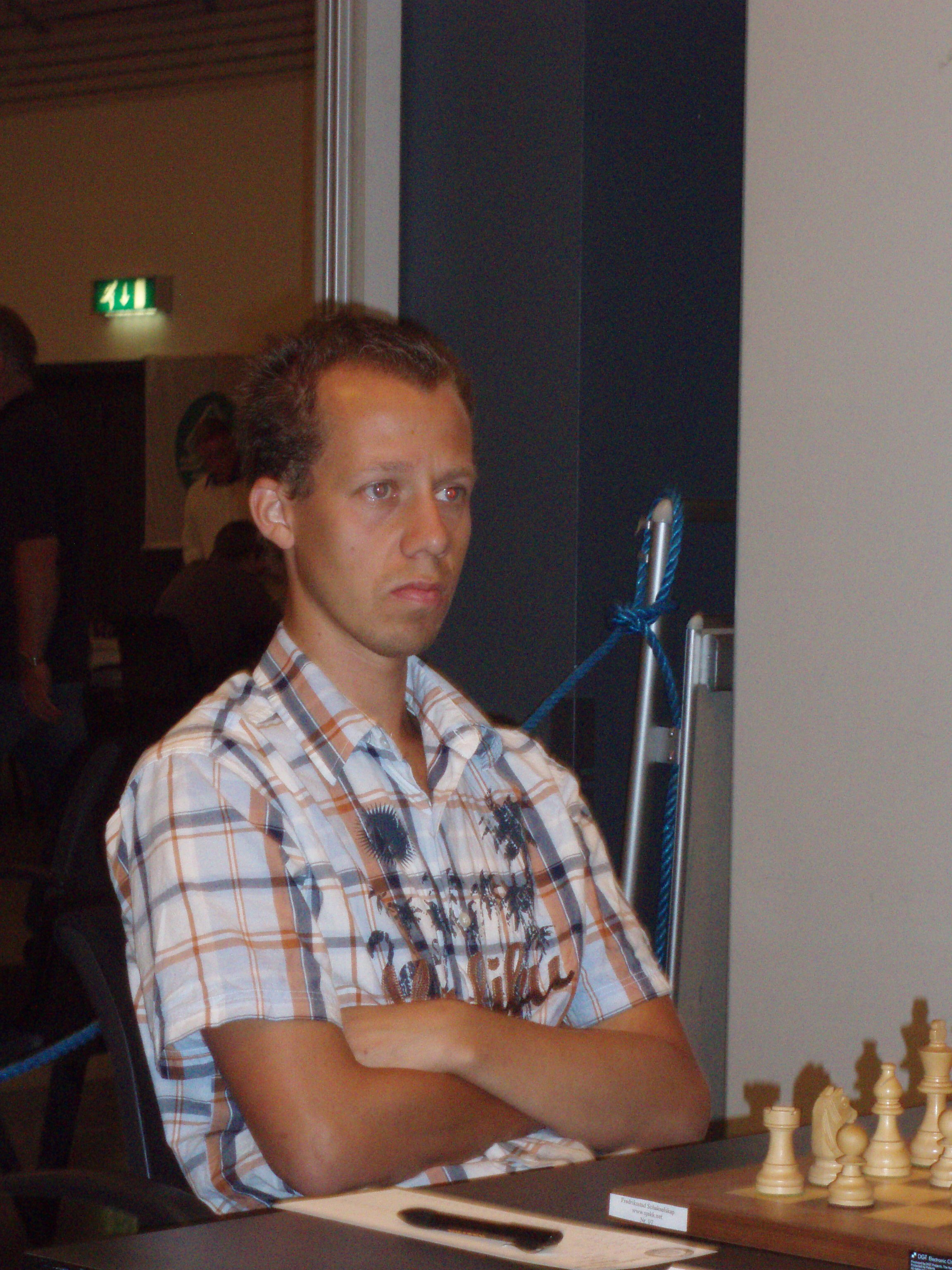
- Lie at the Norwegian Chess Championship at Hamar 2007

Personal information
- Born: 18 November 1980 (age 45) Porsgrunn, Norway

Chess career
- Country: Norway
- Title: Grandmaster (2005)
- FIDE rating: 2459 (July 2026)
- Peak rating: 2563 (October 2007)

Kjetil Aleksander Lie (born 18 November 1980 in Porsgrunn) is a Norwegian chess player, and Norway's eighth International Grandmaster (GM). Lie was the Norwegian chess champion in 2009 and 2010. Representing the chess club in Porsgrunn, Lie is the first Norwegian GM not from the Oslo vicinity.

Lie started playing scholastic chess at the age of eight. In 1994 he won the Norwegian championship for the cadet age group (14- and 15-year-olds). He won the Open Norwegian Championship in 2000, and finished first in the top age group in the Norwegian Youth Championships every year from 2000 to 2003.

In 2002, Lie was awarded the title of International Master. The required three Grandmaster norms came in the Norwegian team chess championship of 2003 to 2004, Politiken Cup in Copenhagen in 2004, and Smartfish Chess Masters in Drammen in December 2004 and January 2005. Even after these norms, Lie had still not achieved the required Elo rating of 2500 until he won the first two rounds in a local tournament in Porsgrunn at the end of February 2005. These wins gave Lie a rating of 2500.5, and it did not matter that Lie immediately proceeded to lose the third game.

During the 2007 candidates matches in Elista, Lie served as Magnus Carlsen's second, helping with analysis and preparations. He was praised by Magnus's father for his efforts and humor.

Lie has played on the Norwegian team at the Chess Olympiads between 2000 and 2010. In the 2008 Olympiad in Dresden, Lie's third round win over Bu Xiangzhi secured Norway an upset win over China.

Lie secured his first Norwegian chess championship in Bergen 2009 with 6.5/9 points, despite an upset loss to Lasse Løvik in the first round. In the 2010 championship, Lie was one of four players to share first place with 6.0/9, the three others being his brother Espen Lie, Joachim Thomassen, and Frode O. O. Urkedal. Later that year, he won the double round-robin play-offs 14–17 October in Stavanger with 4/6.

Lie's playing style is aggressive and sacrificial, and he is known as a dangerous tactician. With White, Lie has varied between 1.c4 and 1.e4, with Black he prefers sharp defenses such as the Sicilian Defence and Benoni Defense.
