= Frode Urkedal =

Norwegian chess grandmaster (born 1993)

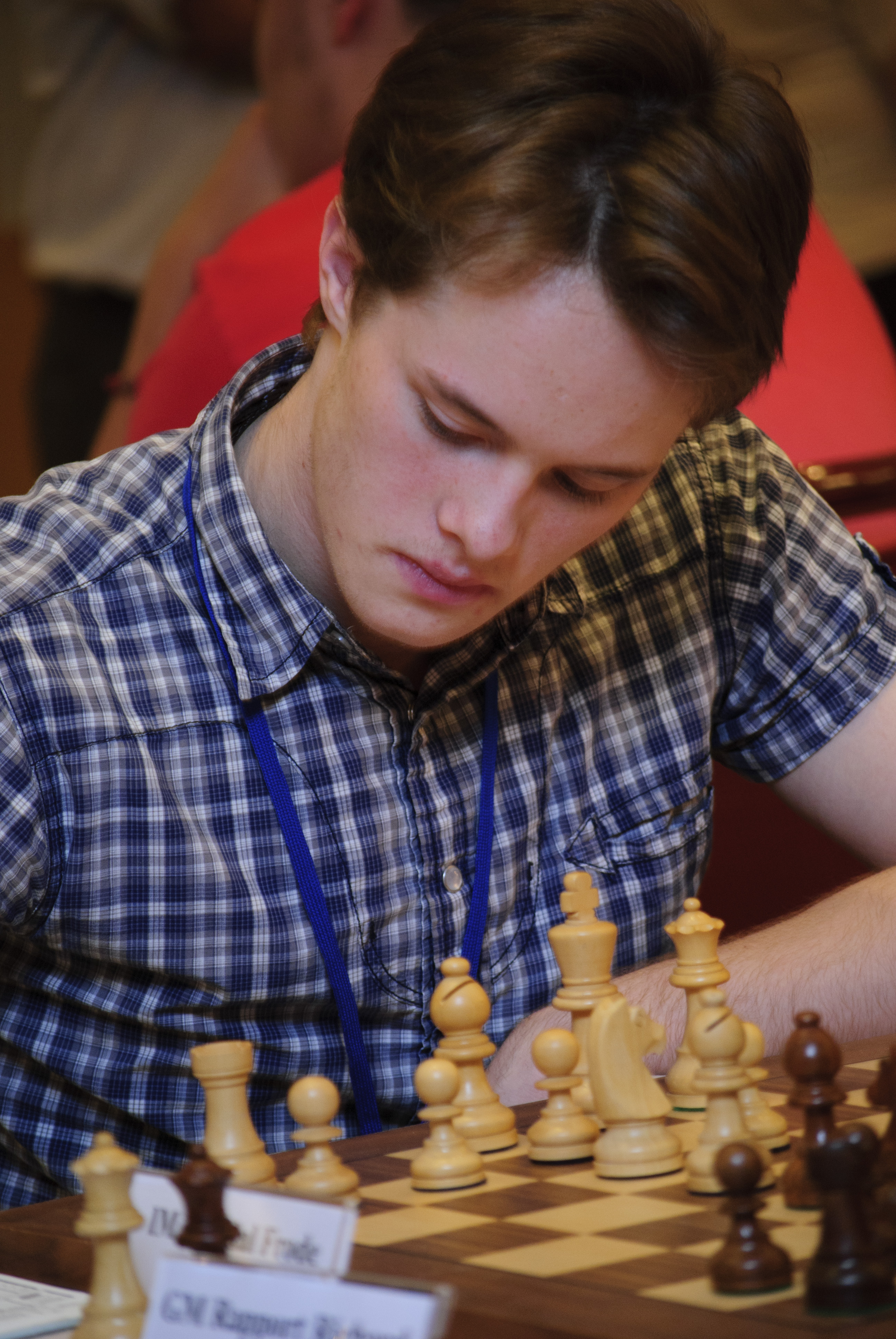
- Urkedal at the 2012 World Junior Chess Championship.

Personal information
- Born: Frode Olav Olsen Urkedal; 14 May 1993 (age 33) Oslo, Norway

Chess career
- Country: Norway
- Title: Grandmaster (2016)
- FIDE rating: 2567 (July 2026)
- Peak rating: 2578 (January 2026)

Frode Olav Olsen Urkedal (born 14 May 1993) is a Norwegian chess player. He holds the title of Grandmaster, and is the 2012 and 2014 Norwegian champion.

== Career ==
Urkedal began playing chess as an after-school activity at his school at Kjelsås, in northern Oslo. Urkedal won each of the age-restricted classes of the Norwegian championship in successive years from 2003 to 2006. In 2003 he won the Miniputt class with 8½ points out of 9, in 2004 he scored 6½ points in the Lilleputt class together with five other players but won the group due to his superior tiebreak score, in 2005 he won the Cadet class outright with 7½ points, and in 2006 he won the Junior championship after tying for first with 6½ points with three other players before winning the play-off for the junior title.

In the 2009 World Youth Chess Championships, Urkedal finished in fifth place in the under-16 section scoring 8 points out of 11. This was Norway's second best result in the youth championship, only Magnus Carlsen's second place in the under-12 section in 2002 surpassed this.

Urkedal achieved the title of FIDE Master in 2008. In January 2011 his performance in the Rilton Cup tournament in Stockholm secured him the final norm needed for the title of International Master.

In the 2012 Norwegian Chess Championship, held in July in Sandefjord, Urkedal scored 7 points out of 9. He drew the pre-tournament favorites Jon Ludvig Hammer and Simen Agdestein, and lost only to Espen Lie. Urkedal won the rest of his games, including a win over the defending champion Berge Østenstad in round 8. This result tied him for first with Espen Lie, and a play-off was arranged in Fredrikstad in October to determine the champion. Urkedal won the first game, and was able to hold a draw from a shaky position in the second, thus securing him the title. Urkedal became the seventh teenager to accomplish this feat.

Urkedal was awarded the title of Grandmaster in April 2016, having scored his final grandmaster norm at the Manacor tournament in Mallorca. In 2019 he won the Nordic Chess Championship and thanks to this victory Urkedal qualified to the FIDE World Cup. In 2019, he achieved 2nd place in the Australasian Masters GM tournament.

Urkedal played for Norway in the Chess Olympiad in 2010 and 2012. He represents the chess club SK 1911 of Oslo.
