= Einar Gausel =

Norwegian chess grandmaster (born 1963)

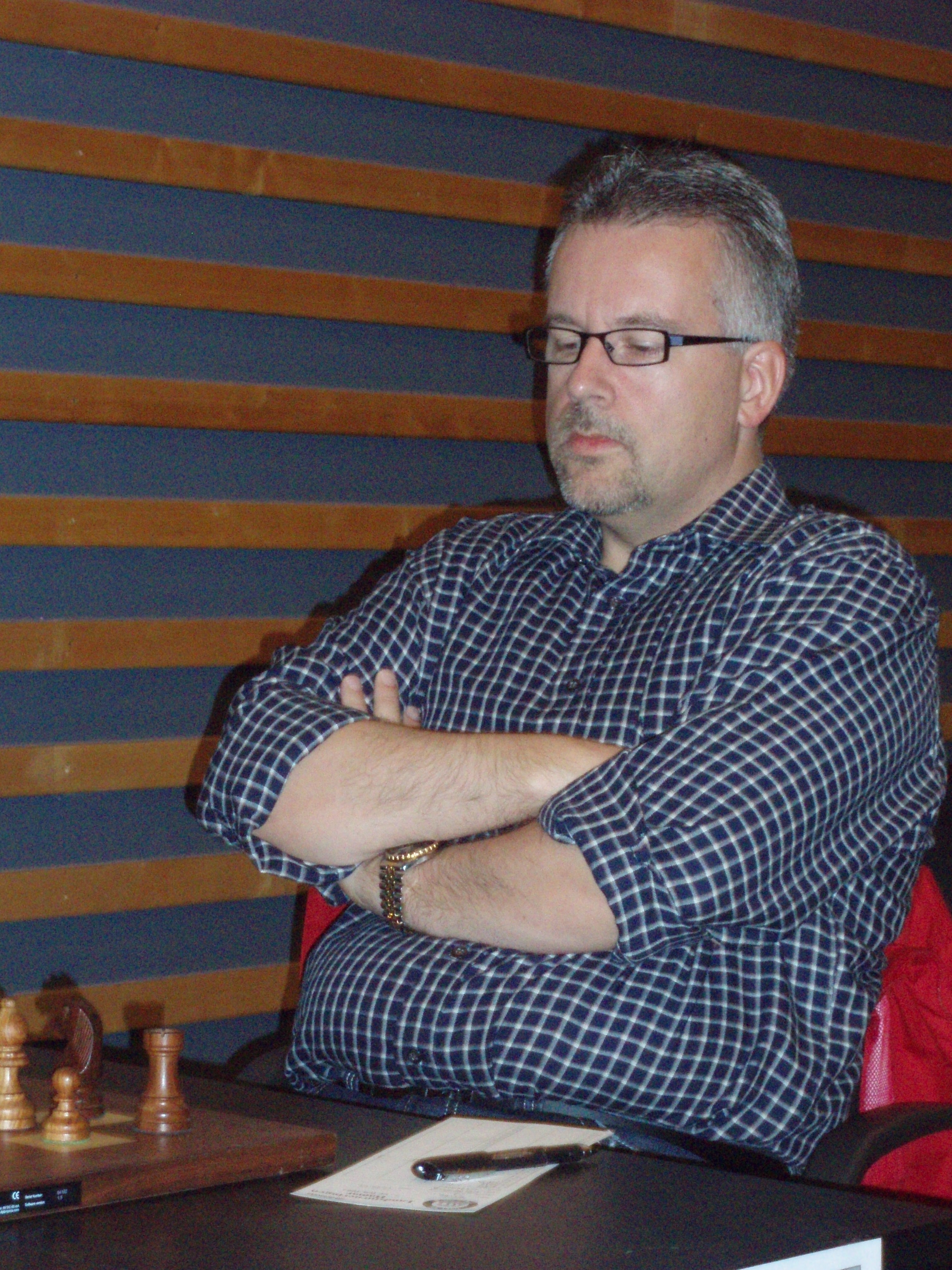
- Gausel in 2007

Personal information
- Full name: Einar Johan Gausel
- Born: 30 November 1963 (age 62)

Chess career
- Country: Norway
- Title: Grandmaster (1995)
- FIDE rating: 2447 (July 2026)
- Peak rating: 2555 (January 1998)

Einar Johan Gausel (born 30 November 1963) is a Norwegian chess player and Norway's third International Grandmaster since 1995.

Gausel has won three Norwegian Chess Championships, in 1992, 1996 and 2001. His Grandmaster title was gained after making good results at tournaments in Gausdal in 1990, 1992, and 1994–1995 and finally winning a Danish tournament.

In 2001 he was equal first with Vladimir Chuchelov in the colossal Cappelle-la-Grande open (702 players, with 92 Grandmasters and 72 International masters).

Gausel is also the chess columnist for the Oslo newspaper Dagbladet. Gausel represents the largest chess club in Norway, Oslo Schackselskap.

Gausel's playing style is mostly positional and strategic. With White he usually opens with 1.d4, 1.c4 or 1.Nf3. With Black against 1.e4 he often plays solid openings like the Caro–Kann Defence, but has also played more adventurous lines such as the Center Counter Defence. Against 1.d4 Gausel often plays the Slav or Semi-Slav Defense.
