= Berge Østenstad =

Norwegian chess grandmaster (born 1964)

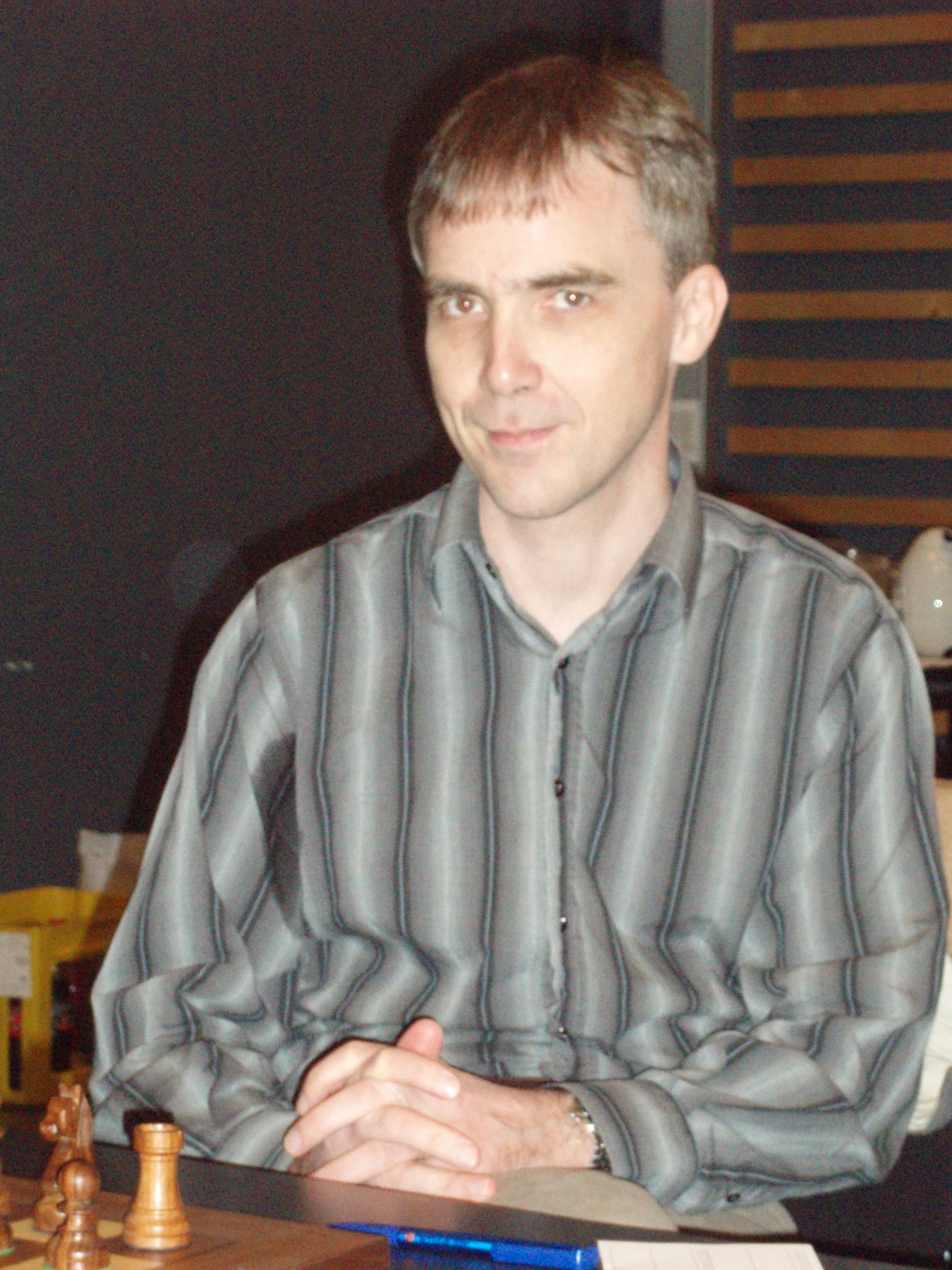

Personal information
- Born: 15 September 1964 (age 61) Asker, Norway

Chess career
- Country: Norway
- Title: Grandmaster (2003)
- FIDE rating: 2405 (July 2026)
- Peak rating: 2506 (October 2004)

Berge Østenstad (born 15 September 1964) is a Norwegian chess player and Norway's sixth International Grandmaster. Østenstad plays for the chess club in Asker. He appears on the official FIDE rating list as "Ostenstad, Berge".

Berge Østenstad has won more Norwegian Chess Championships than any other player apart from Simen Agdestein, eight in total. He won in 1984, 1990, 1994, 1997, 1999, 2003, 2004 and 2011. He played for Norway in the Chess Olympiads of 1984, 1990 and 2004.

Østenstad gained the title of International Master in 1987. He achieved his first GM norm in Gausdal in 1990, his second in Biel in 1990 and the third in Gothenburg in 2003. His rating peaked the required 2500 in 1991. The Biel norm came after FIDE liberalized the requirements for GM norms by allowing them to be achieved before the tournament ended, and made these changes retroactive.
