= Knut Jøran Helmers =

Norwegian chess player (1957–2021)

Knut Helmers
Personal information
- Full name: Knut Jøran Helmers
- Born: 7 February 1957
- Died: 15 April 2021 (aged 64)

Chess career
- Country: Norway
- Title: International Master (1978)
- Peak rating: 2465 (July 1986)

Knut Jøran Helmers (7 February 1957 – 15 April 2021) was a Norwegian chess player.

He won the Junior National Championships in 1972, after a play-off. He has been Norwegian Chess Champion twice, in 1976 and 1977. He also won the Nordic Chess Championship in Reykjavík in 1981.

Helmers became an International Master (IM) in 1978, and was the seventh in Norway to take the title.

He competed at five Chess Olympiads (Team World Chess Championships) for Norway, in 1976, 1978, 1980, 1982 and 1984. In 1980 and 1982 he played on the first table. In these 5 tournaments, he played a total of 52 matches, and finished with 30 points after 15 wins, 30 draws, and 7 defeats. Helmers retired from active tournament play in 1986.

Helmers was a member of Oslo Schakselskap and Sjakklubben Stjernen. He wrote a chess column for Arbeiderbladet.

== Bibliography ==
- Revansjen som glapp - Returmatchen Kasparov-Karpov 1986, Formatic A/S Fagbokforlag, 1986, ISBN 82-90431-00-7
- Sjakkleksjoner med Simen Agdestein, 1987, ISBN 82-496-0064-9
