= Daan de Lange =

Norwegian chess player

Personal information
- Born: 4 August 1915
- Died: 29 May 1988 (aged 72) Hamar, Norway

Chess career
- Country: Netherlands; Norway

Daan Jacobus Siegfried de Lange (4 August 1915 – 29 May 1988) was a Dutch origin Norwegian chess player, Norwegian Chess Championship winner (1960).

== Biography ==
Daan de Lange was born in the Netherlands. In his youth, he was professionally involved in football – for some time Daan de Lange played in Ajax. He also studied music. During the German occupation he lived in England. Daan de Lange served in the music division of the United States Army. After the World War II he returned to the Netherlands. In the mid 1950s Daan de Lange moved to Norway. He lived in Stavanger, then in Hamar. Daan de Lange earned playing the piano. For two decades, he was one of the leading Norwegian chess players. Daan de Lange won Norwegian Chess Championship in 1960.

Daan de Lange played for Norway in the Chess Olympiads:

- In 1960, at second board in the 14th Chess Olympiad in Leipzig (+5, =6, -7),
- In 1966, at first reserve board in the 17th Chess Olympiad in Havana (+3, =1, -6),
- In 1968, at second reserve board in the 18th Chess Olympiad in Lugano (+7, =1, -2),
- In 1970, at first reserve board in the 19th Chess Olympiad in Siegen (+4, =6, -1).

Daan de Lange played for Norway in the Clare Benedict Cup:

- In 1977, at fourth board in the 22nd Clare Benedict Chess Cup in Copenhagen (+0, =1, -3).

Daan de Lange played for Norway in the Nordic Chess Cup:

- In 1970, at sixt board in the 1st Nordic Chess Cup in Großenbrode (+1, =2, -0) and won team bronze medal and individual gold medal.
