= Espen Lie =

Norwegian chess player (born 1984)

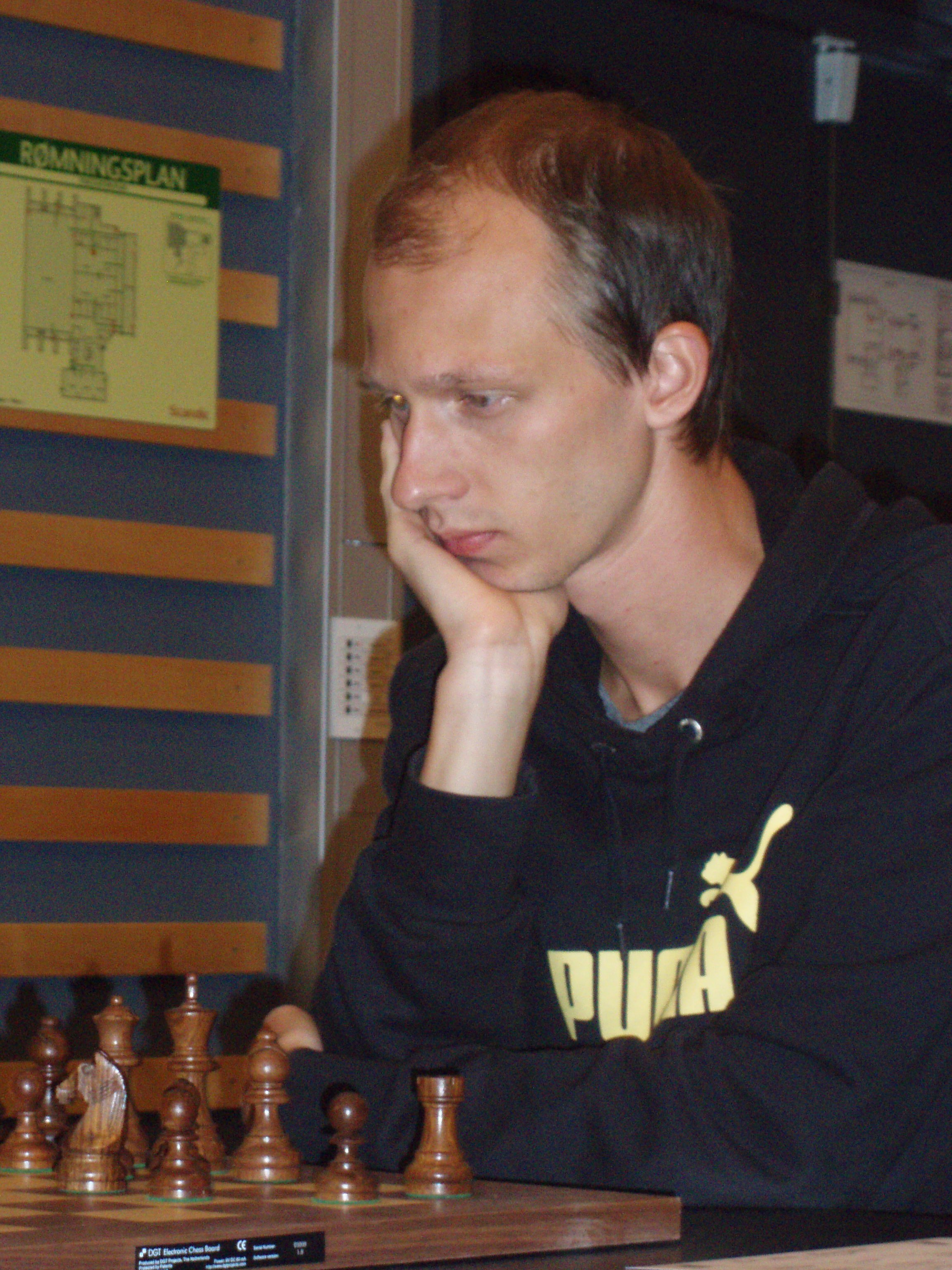
- Espen Lie at the Norwegian Chess Championship at Hamar 2007

Personal information
- Born: January 3, 1984 (age 42)

Chess career
- Country: Norway
- Title: International Master (2007)
- FIDE rating: 2454 (July 2026)
- Peak rating: 2492 (April 2018)

Espen Lie (born January 3, 1984) is a Norwegian chess player who currently holds the title of International Master, and was the Norwegian Chess Champion for 2007. He is the younger brother of GM Kjetil A. Lie. Lie plays for the chess club in Porsgrunn.

In the 2007 Norwegian championship, played at Hamar, Espen Lie and Geir Sune Tallaksen (also representing Porsgrunn) shared first place with 6.5 points out of 9. The result was viewed as surprising, for Lie and Tallaksen were ranked as number 9 and 10 (out of 20) in the tournament, behind a number of grandmasters. A play-off between the two was arranged September 21–23 in Porsgrunn to determine the champion, and Lie prevailed in the sixth game after the first five games all were drawn. Espen Lie has two GM norms, the first one after 5.5/9 in an international tournament in Reykjavik, and the second after 7/9 in the 2012 Norwegian chess championship in Sandefjord, where he tied for first with IM Frode O. O. Urkedal. Lie lost the play-off for the title after losing the first game and drawing the second.

Apart from chess, Lie's training to become a teacher.
