= Kongshavn (surname) =

Kongshavn is a Norwegian surname. Notable people with the surname include:

- Emilie Nicolas Kongshavn (born 1987), Norwegian singer-songwriter
- Gudmund Taksdal Kongshavn (born 1991), Norwegian footballer
- Harry Kongshavn (1899–1969), Norwegian chess player
