= Johan Salomon =

Norwegian chess grandmaster (born 1997)

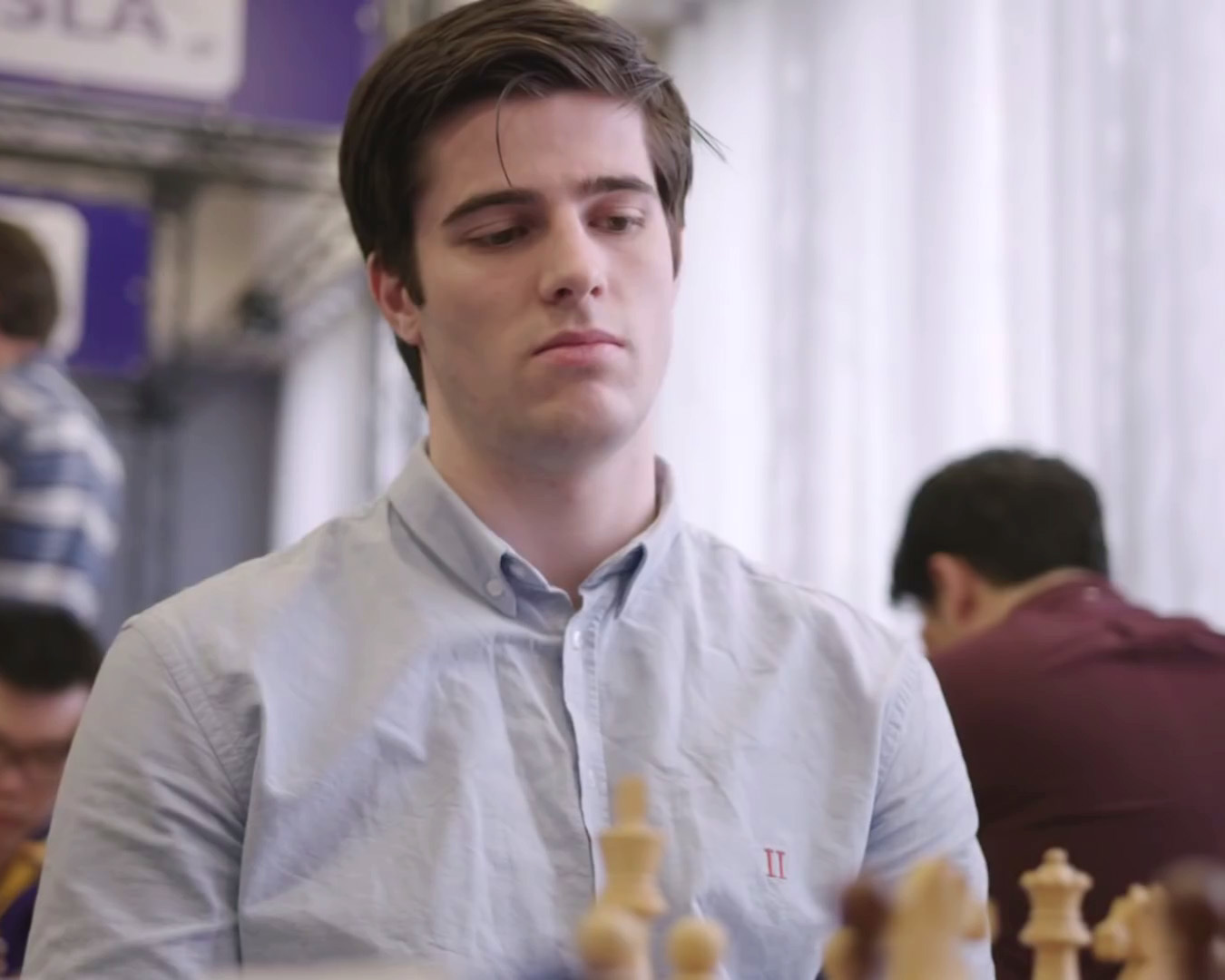

Personal information
- Born: 7 May 1997 (age 29)

Chess career
- Country: Norway
- Title: Grandmaster (2017)
- FIDE rating: 2492 (August 2026)
- Peak rating: 2514 (July 2019)

Johan Salomon (born 7 May 1997) is a Norwegian chess grandmaster. He was Norwegian Chess Champion in 2016.

== Chess career ==
He achieved the title International Master in 2015, and was awarded the title of grandmaster in 2017.

Salomon achieved his first Grandmaster norm in the 2015 Sitges tournament, with subsequent norms in the Manhem Chess Week in Gothenburg in 2016, and in the 19th Dubai Open Chess Tournament in 2017. He was designated IM in 2015, and GM in 2017.

Salomon won the Norwegian Chess Championship in 2016.
