= Erling Myhre =

Norwegian chess player

Personal information
- Born: 11 January 1903 Oslo, Norway
- Died: 12 April 1971 (aged 68)

Chess career
- Country: Norway

Erling Godtfred Myhre (11 January 1903 – 12 April 1971) was a Norwegian chess player, three-times Norwegian Chess Championship winner (1946, 1950, 1955).

== Biography ==
From the late 1940s to the begin 1960s, Erling Myhre was one of the leading Norwegian chess players. He played for the chess club Oslo Schakselskap. Erling Myhre won Norwegian Chess Championships three times: 1946, 1950 and 1955.

Erling Myhre played for Norway in the Chess Olympiads:

- In 1950, at first board in the 9th Chess Olympiad in Dubrovnik (+2, =2, -10),
- In 1952, at second board in the 10th Chess Olympiad in Helsinki (+1, =4, -7),
- In 1960, at second reserve board in the 14th Chess Olympiad in Leipzig (+0, =1, -2).
