= Oluf Kavlie-Jørgensen =

Norwegian chess player

Personal information
- Born: 15 April 1902 Bergen, Norway
- Died: 1984

Chess career
- Country: Norway

Oluf Kavlie-Jørgensen (15 April 1902 – 1984) was a Norwegian chess player, Norwegian Chess Championship winner (1938).

== Biography ==
In the 1930s Oluf Kavlie-Jørgensen was one of the leading Norwegian chess players. He has been the strongest player in the Bergen Chess Club Bergens SK for over 60 years. In 1938, in Grimstad Oluf Kavlie-Jørgensen won the Norwegian Chess Championship.

Oluf Kavlie-Jørgensen played for Norway in the Chess Olympiads:

- In 1930, at third board in the 3rd Chess Olympiad in Hamburg (+3, =4, -8),
- In 1937, at second board in the 7th Chess Olympiad in Stockholm (+1, =5, -9).

Oluf Kavlie-Jørgensen played for Norway in the unofficial Chess Olympiad:

- In 1936, at second board in the 3rd unofficial Chess Olympiad in Munich (+2, =4, -11).
