= Jonathan Tisdall =

Irish-Norwegian chess grandmaster and journalist (born 1958)

Personal information
- Born: Jonathan D. Tisdall; August 26, 1958 (age 67) Buffalo, New York, United States

Chess career
- Country: Ireland (until 1987); Norway (since 1987)
- Title: Grandmaster (1993)
- Peak rating: 2515 (July 1996)

Jonathan D. Tisdall (born August 26, 1958) is an American-born Norwegian and Irish grandmaster of chess (title awarded 1993) and works as a freelance journalist. He was born in Buffalo, New York to a Japanese mother and an Irish father.

He was Norwegian Chess Champion in 1987, 1991 and 1995. Combining chess with his job as a journalist, he often attends major chess events as a reporter for Reuters.

He is one of two people on the staff of the English-language section of the Norwegian newspaper Aftenposten's internet edition. He has also written articles in magazines such as The Spectator, The Economist and Scanorama.

In recent years, he has been studying the Japanese chess variant of shogi.

== Books ==
- Tisdall, Jonathan (1997). Improve Your Chess Now. Everyman Chess. 224 pp. ISBN 1-85744-156-7.
- Seirawan, Yasser; Tisdall, Jonathan (1997), Five Crowns, International Chess Enterprises, ISBN 978-1879479029
- Tisdall, Jonathan (1997). "Magnus Carlsen: A Life in Pictures." New in Chess. 160 pp. ISBN 9056919911.
