= Roy Fyllingen =

Norwegian chess player

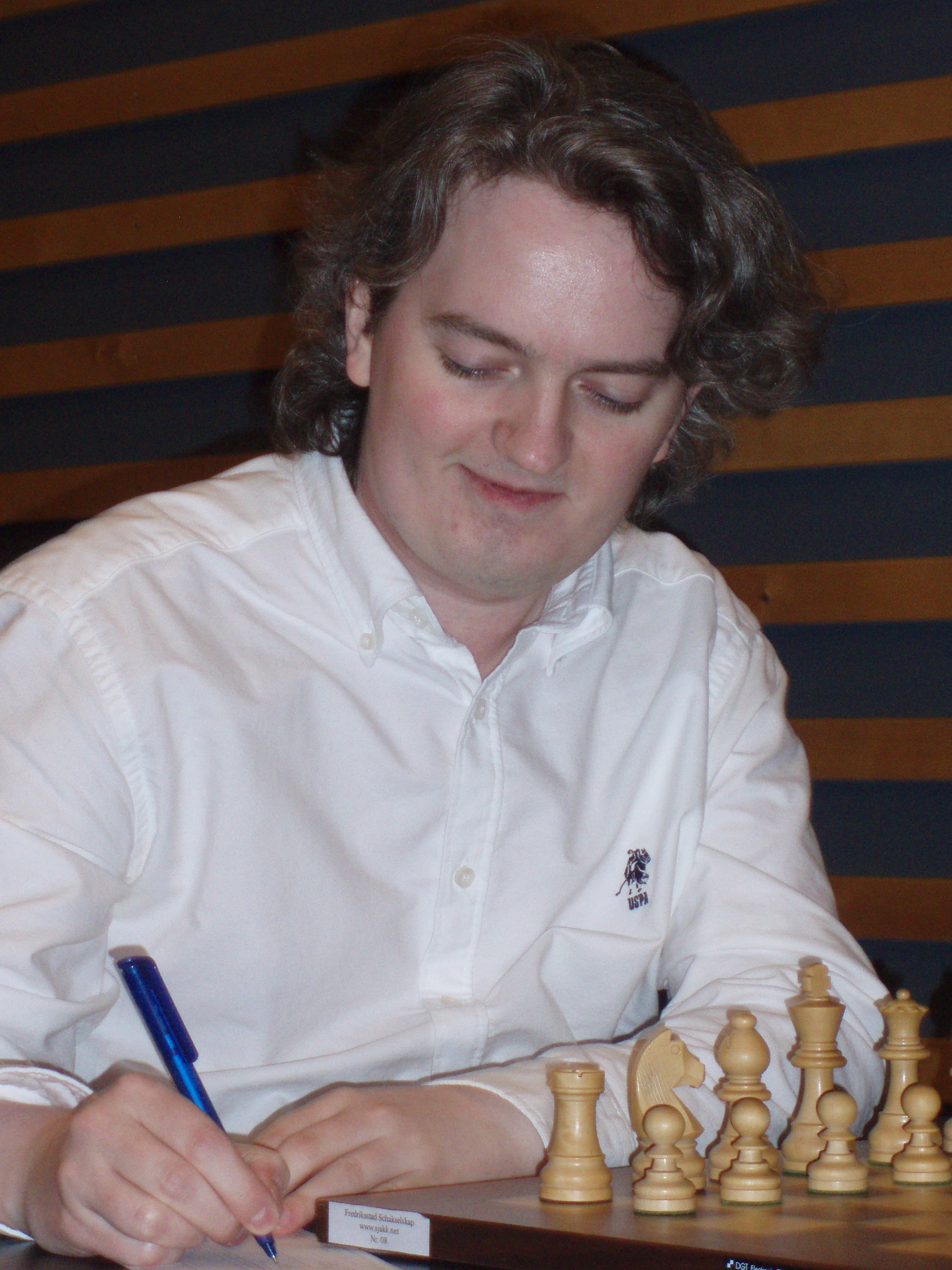
- Fyllingen in 2007

Personal information
- Born: January 31, 1975 (age 51)

Chess career
- Country: Norway
- Title: International Master (1995)
- Peak rating: 2429 (January 1999)

Roy Harald Fyllingen (born January 31, 1975) is a Norwegian chess player who holds the title of International Master. He won the Norwegian Chess Championship in 1998. He represents the Bergen's Chess Club, and plays the top board for the club in the current team chess championship.

According to ChessBase, Fyllingen usually plays 1.d4 when he is White. With Black against 1.d4 he frequently plays openings in the Nimzo-, Bogo-, and Queen's Indian complex. Against 1.e4 he frequently plays the open games (1.e4 e5) or the French Defence (1.e4 e6).
