= Andreas Gulbrandsen =

Norwegian chess player

Personal information
- Born: 29 July 1906 Moss, Norway, Norway
- Died: 3 December 1989 (aged 83)

Chess career
- Country: Norway

Andreas Gulbrandsen (29 July 1906 – 3 December 1989) was a Norwegian chess player, Norwegian Chess Championship winner (1931).

== Biography ==
Andreas Gulbrandsen joined the chess club of his native city of Moss at the age of 15. He quickly moved to the number of club competition leaders. In the 1930s Andreas Gulbrandsen was one of the leading Norwegian chess players. He won the Norwegian Chess Championship in 1931. Also he was known in Norway as a blindfold chess player. In the early 1930s Andreas Gulbrandsen gave a simultaneous exhibition in blindfold chess play on 12 boards (+7, =2, -3). Many times he was the champion of the chess club of the city of Moss (the last time - in 1977). Andreas Gulbrandsen completed participate in chess tournaments in 1978.

Andreas Gulbrandsen played for Norway in the Chess Olympiads:

- In 1931, at reserve board in the 4th Chess Olympiad in Prague (+2, =1, -10),
- In 1937, at third board in the 7th Chess Olympiad in Stockholm (+3, =2, -10).

Andreas Gulbrandsen played for Norway in the unofficial Chess Olympiad:

- In 1936, at fifth board in the 3rd unofficial Chess Olympiad in Munich (+6, =4, -7).
