= Aryan Tari =

Norwegian chess grandmaster (born 1999)

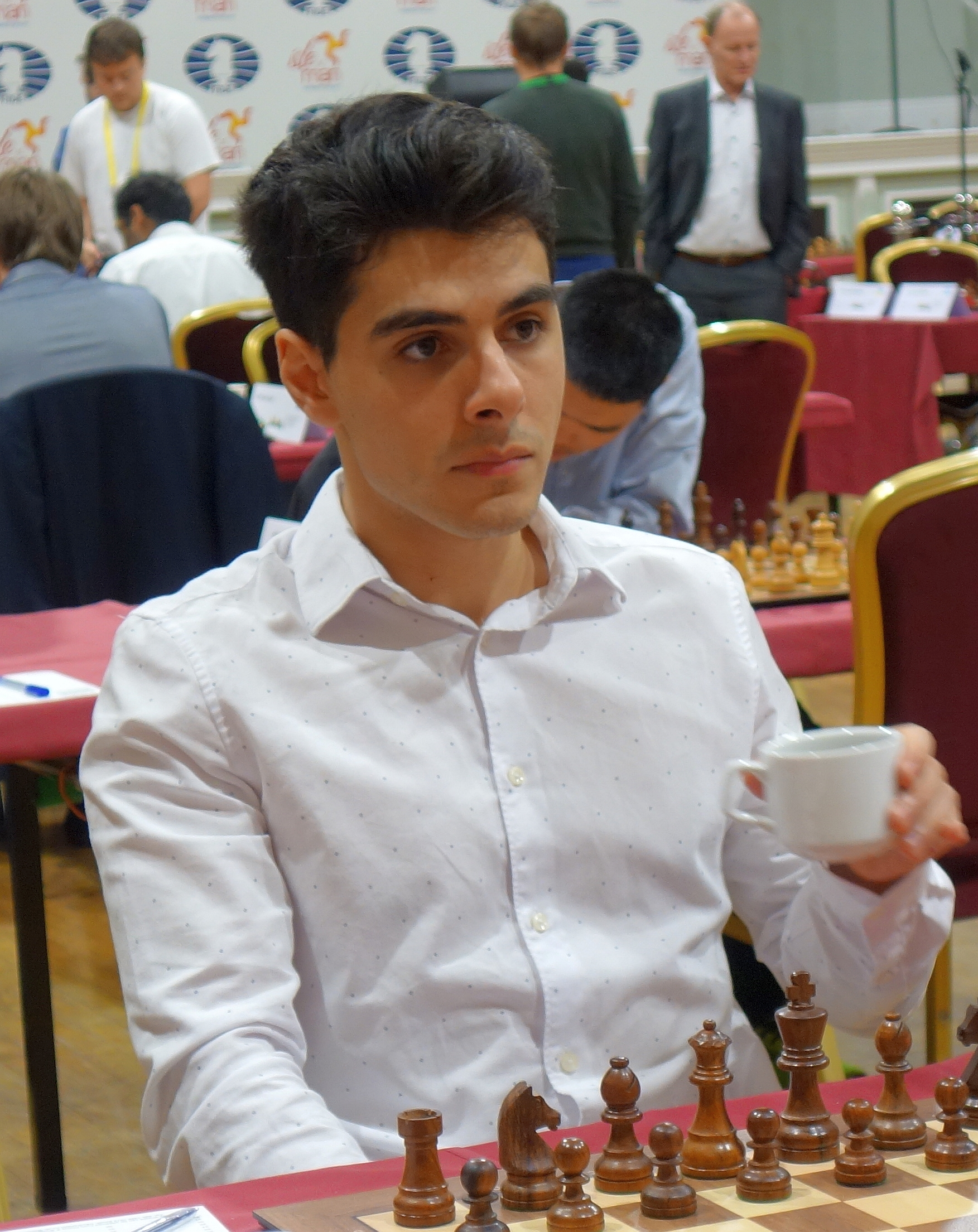
- Tari in 2023

Personal information
- Born: 4 June 1999 (age 27) Stavanger, Norway

Chess career
- Country: Norway
- Title: Grandmaster (2016)
- FIDE rating: 2647 (October 2026)
- Peak rating: 2672 (July 2022)
- Ranking: No. 70 (October 2026)
- Peak ranking: No. 69 (September 2026)

Aryan Tari (Persian: آرین طاری; born 4 June 1999) is a Norwegian chess grandmaster. Tari was Norwegian champion in 2015 and 2019 and won the World Junior Chess Championship in 2017. As of May 2024, he is the third-highest ranked player from Norway.

== Chess career ==
=== 2012–2014 ===
Tari has played chess since the age of five. He won the Junior section of the Norwegian Chess Championship in 2012, qualifying him for the championship section in 2013. At the Open Norwegian Championship in Fagernes in March 2013, Tari finished in seventh place and scored a norm for the title of Grandmaster, the second youngest Norwegian player ever to have done so at the time. Following an eighth-place finish in 2013 and a second-place finish in 2014.

=== 2015–2018 ===
Tari won the 2015 Norwegian Chess Championship, At age 16 he was the third youngest player to achieve this feat, after Simen Agdestein and Magnus Carlsen, who won at age 15. Tari secured his second grandmaster norm over nine rounds at the 2015 European Team Chess Championship in Reykjavík where he played Norway's third board and scored six points. A special FIDE clause for the continental team championships regards this as a 20-game norm, which together with his norm from Fagernes and rating over 2500 is sufficient for the grandmaster title; this title was awarded at the FIDE congress in March 2016. He was Norway's 12th player to be awarded this title.

At the European Individual Chess Championship, played 12–23 May 2016, Tari achieved his best result in his career with 7½/11 (+5–1=5). This gave him a twenty-second-place finish and earned him a berth in the Chess World Cup 2017 in Tbilisi, where he was eliminated in the second round after losing 1½-½ to Aleksandr Lenderman.

=== 2019–2022 ===
In the 2019–20 season, he played as a foreigner for the Czech Extraliga team Slavia Kroměříž. Tari won the Norwegian Chess Championship 2019 for the second time ever. In 2020–21 Spanish CECLUB championship, he played for Xadrez Ourense. Tari played in the Norway Chess 2022 and defeated Magnus Carlsen for the first time, later he represented Norway in the 44th Chess Olympiad which was held in Chennai, India.

== Personal life ==
Tari was born in Stavanger to Faranak and Siamak Tari, both from Iran who migrated to Norway before his birth. He grew up in Lierskogen outside Drammen, Norway. He is currently studying business at the University of Missouri.
