= Evgeny Romanov (chess player) =

Russian chess grandmaster (born 1988)

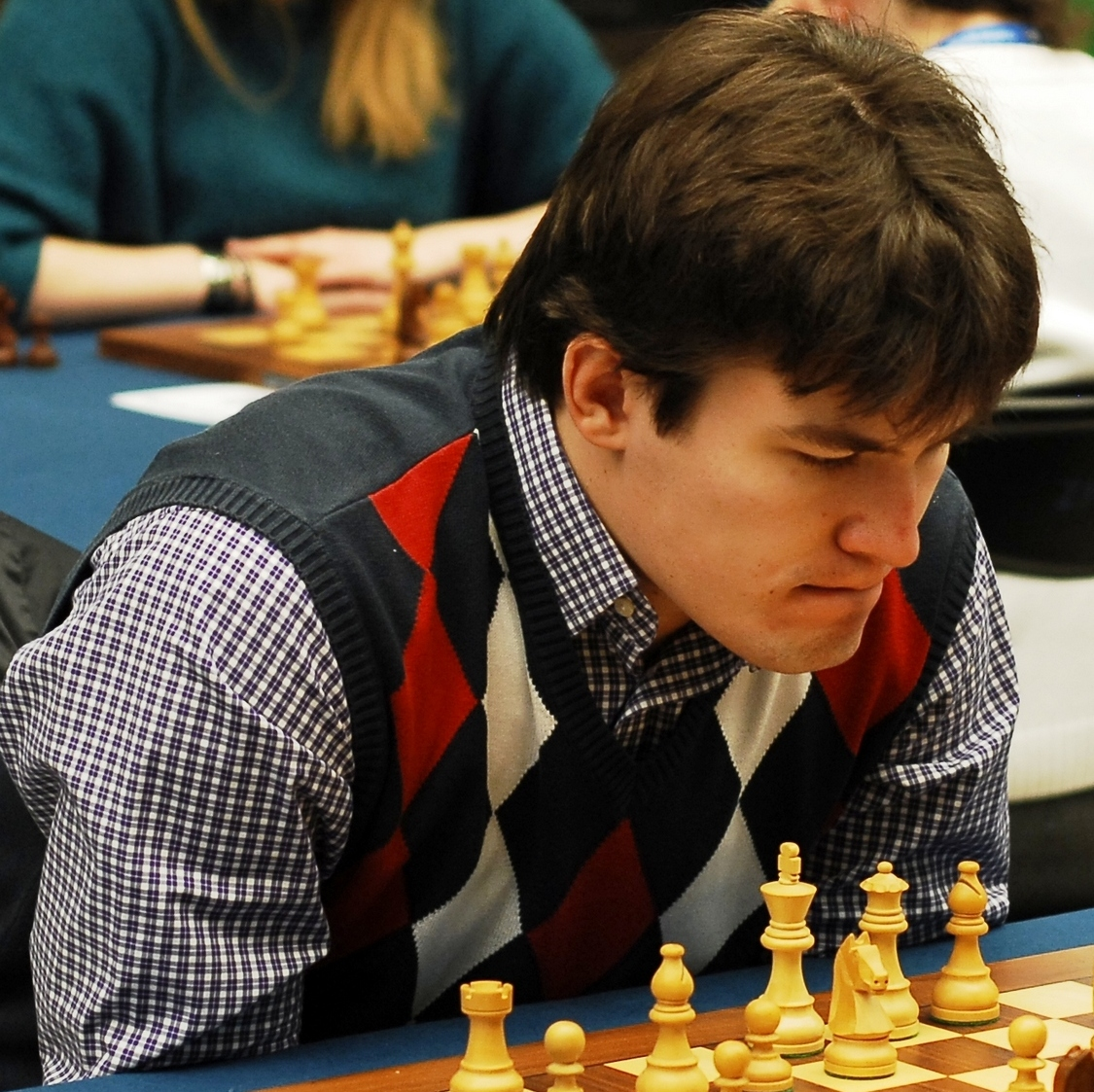

Personal information
- Born: Evgeny Anatolyevich Romanov; November 2, 1988 (age 37) Kaliningrad, Russian SFSR, Soviet Union

Chess career
- Country: Russia (until 2022); Norway (2022–2024); North Macedonia (since 2024)
- Title: Grandmaster (2007)
- FIDE rating: 2560 (October 2026)
- Peak rating: 2662 (June 2013)
- Peak ranking: No. 81 (June 2013)

Evgeny Anatolyevich Romanov (Russian: Евге́ний Анато́льевич Рома́нов; born November 2, 1988) is a Russian chess player who represents North Macedonia.

== Biography ==
FIDE Master since 1998. After graduating from school (with a gold medal) he received a law degree at the RSU named after I. Kant. Among his mentors are Vladimir Yurkov, Yuri Balashov, Iossif Dorfman.

Since 2005, an International Master, in 2007 receives a Grandmaster title.

== Chess career ==
In 1998 he won the Russian and World Youth Chess Championships in Oropesa del Mar in the Under-10 division. He was first in the European Youth Chess Championships in groups under 12 (Halkidiki, 2000) and under 14 years old (Peniscola, 2002).

He won in the individual competition of Russian championship among students (Belgorod, 2008)

At international competitions: Euroorient Masters, Nice, (2008) - 1st place; Rapid Chess tournament "Liepaja Castling" (2008) and (2015) - 1st place; XXXIII Tenkes Kupa, Harkany, (2009) - 1st place; festival of intellectual games, Cannes, (2012) - 1st place; LGA Cup, Nuremberg, (2012 and 2013) - 1st place; 4t torneig obert ITT Jahv McGregor a Bogotá, Colòmbia - 1st place; Festival Sunway Sitges - 1st place and many others.

Recognized as the best player of the Deutsche Schach Bundesliga season 2012/2013.

Bronze medalist of the European Championship among men, (Legnica, 2013).

Participant of the World Cup - Khanty-Mansiysk, 2011 and Tromso, 2013.

In club competitions, among other things, he played for the teams “Debut-DVGTU” (Vladivostok), “South Ural” (Chelyabinsk), "Chigorin chess club” (St. Petersburg). Abroad played for Erfurter Schachklub (Germany) [3], Sportfreunde Katernberg 1913 E.V. (Germany), Kristiansund Sjakklubb and Vaalerenga Sjakklubb, - champion of Norway, (2011, 2015 and 2016, 2017, 2018), ŠK AD Jičín Czech Republic.

Coach of the Norwegian men's team at the Tromsø Olympics in 2014 and the German men's team at the Baku Olympics in 2016.

Bronze medalist of the 2018 Batumi Olympics and silver medalist of the 2019 European teams championship as a coach of the Georgian women's team.

In March 2022, amid the Russian invasion of Ukraine, Romanov transferred from the Chess Federation of Russia to the Norwegian Chess Federation. He was the first Russian player to leave the Russian Chess Federation in wake of the invasion.

== Notable games ==
- Sergey Volkov vs Evgeny Romanov (2008)
- Nikita Vitiugov vs Evgeny Romanov (2009)
