= Leif Øgaard =

Norwegian chess grandmaster (born 1952)

Personal information
- Born: 5 January 1952 (age 74)

Chess career
- Country: Norway
- Title: Grandmaster (2007)
- Peak rating: 2510 (July 1982)

Leif Øgaard (born 5 January 1952) is a Norwegian chess player. He is the ninth Norwegian to achieve the title of Grandmaster. Øgaard won the Norwegian Chess Championship five times, in 1974, 1975, 1979, 1985 and 1993. He gained his IM title in 1974. In 1981 and 1982, Øgaard won two tournaments at Gausdal, each netting him a GM-norm. His third and final GM-norm was won in the Norwegian team chess championship in 2006–2007, making him the first person to score 2 GM norms with a 25-year gap in-between as well as one of the oldest players to be awarded the Grandmaster title, since his last norm came when he was already in the mid 50's. The GM title was finally approved at FIDE's presidential board meeting in Tallinn on 22–24 June 2007. Øgaard is a member of the Oslo chess club Oslo Schackselskap.
