= Trygve Halvorsen =

Norwegian chess player

Personal information
- Born: unknown
- Died: unknown

Chess career
- Country: Norway

Trygve Halvorsen (unknown – unknown) was a Norwegian chess player, two-times Norwegian Chess Championship winner (1933, 1934).

== Biography ==
In the 1930s Trygve Halvorsen was one of the leading Norwegian chess players. He twice in row won the Norwegian Chess Championship: in 1933 and 1934.

Trygve Halvorsen played for Norway in the Chess Olympiads:

- In 1930, at reserve board in the 3rd Chess Olympiad in Hamburg (+2, =4, -8),
- In 1931, at third board in the 4th Chess Olympiad in Prague (+3, =7, -5),
- In 1958, at second reserve board in the 13th Chess Olympiad in Munich (+2, =2, -4).
