= Hans Christian Christoffersen =

Norwegian chess player

Personal information
- Born: 9 October 1882
- Died: 3 March 1966 (aged 83)

Chess career
- Country: Norway

Hans Christian Christoffersen (9 October 1882 – 3 March 1966) was a Norwegian chess player, three-times Norwegian Chess Championship winner (1926, 1929, 1936).

== Biography ==
Hans Christian Christoffersen was photographer by profession. In 1905, he was one of the founders of the chess club in Drammen. In the mid 1920's - 1930s Hans Christian Christoffersen was one of the leading Norwegian chess players. He three times won the Norwegian Chess Championship: in 1926, 1929 and 1936.

Hans Christian Christoffersen played for Norway in the Chess Olympiads:

- In 1931, at first board in the 4th Chess Olympiad in Prague (+1, =1, -12),
- In 1937, at reserve board in the 7th Chess Olympiad in Stockholm (+1, =3, -7).

Hans Christian Christoffersen played for Norway in the unofficial Chess Olympiad:

- In 1936, at first board in the 3rd unofficial Chess Olympiad in Munich (+1, =4, -9).
