= Yngvar Barda =

Norwegian chess player

Personal information
- Born: 5 February 1935
- Died: 23 July 1999 (aged 64)

Chess career
- Country: Norway

Yngvar Barda (5 February 1935 – 23 July 1999) was a Norwegian chess player, Nordic Chess Cup medalist (1970).

== Biography ==
Yngvar Barda was eldest son of first Norwegian International Master (IM) Olaf Barda (1909 – 1971). In the 1950s he was one of the leading Norwegian junior chess players. In 1953, in Copenhagen Yngvar Barda represented Norway in 2nd World Junior Chess Championship.

Yngvar Barda played for Norway in the Chess Olympiad:

- In 1956, at first reserve board in the 12th Chess Olympiad in Moscow (+0, =1, -6).

Yngvar Barda played for Norway in the Nordic Chess Cups:

- In 1970, at eight board in the 1st Nordic Chess Cup in Großenbrode (+0, =2, -1) and won team bronze medal,
- In 1972, at fourth board in the 3rd Nordic Chess Cup in Großenbrode (+0, =2, -2),
- In 1974, at second board in the 5th Nordic Chess Cup in Eckernförde (+0, =3, -2).
