= Paul Svedenborg =

Norwegian chess player (born 1947)

Paul Svedenborg (born 24 April 1947) is a Norwegian chess player who won the Norwegian Chess Championship twice, in 1966 and 1967, representing the chess club in Narvik. He represented the Norwegian national team in the Chess Olympiads of 1964 in Tel Aviv, and 1968 in Lugano.

Svedenborg's style is marked by active play, where he played for development and space, even at the cost of pawn weaknesses.

In chess opening theory, Svedenborg has a variation named after him in the Latvian Gambit. After 1.e4 e5 2.Nf3 f5 3.Bc4 fxe4 4.Nxe5, Svedenborg demonstrated the viability of the central thrust 4...d5, which now bears his name. Although the move was known previously, it was Svedenborg who showed that Black's position remains playable after 5.Qh5+ g6 6.Nxg6 hxg6 7.Qxg6+ Kd7 (instead of the old Ke7).
