= Marianne Aasen =

Norwegian politician (born 1967)

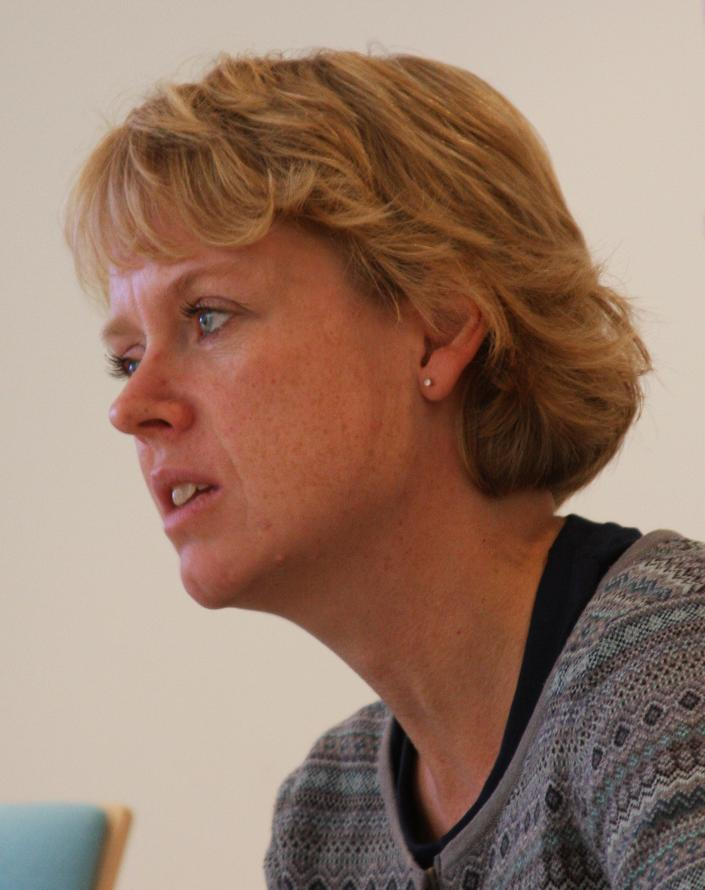
- MP Marianne Aasen
- Born: 21 February 1967 (age 59); Bergen, Norway
- Education: University of Oslo
- Occupations: journalist and politician
- Spouse: Simen Agdestein (m. 1996; div. 2008)

Marianne Aasen (born 21 February 1967) is a Norwegian politician for the Labour Party.

She was born in Bergen, but grew up in Moss. She graduated with a cand.polit. degree in 1993 from the University of Oslo. She worked as a journalist in Arbeiderbladet from 1991 to 1993 and Avisenes Nyhetsbyrå from 1993 to 1995. She was then information director of the European Movement Norway from 1998 to 2000.

In her party she worked as a political advisor for the Labour Party parliamentary group from 1995 to 1996 and 2001 to 2005. From 2000 to 2001, during the first cabinet Stoltenberg, she was a political advisor in the Ministry of Local Government and Regional Development. Aasen has never held local political office, but chaired the party chapter in Asker from 2003 to 2004. She was elected to the Norwegian Parliament from Akershus in 2005.

For twelve years she was married to Simen Agdestein, an International Grandmaster of chess and former Norwegian international footballer. The couple had two children, but they split in 2008.
