= Harry Kongshavn =

Norwegian chess player (1899–1969)

Personal information
- Born: 23 February 1899 Hidra, Norway
- Died: 1969 or 1970

Chess career
- Country: Norway

Harry Kongshavn (23 February 1899 – 17 December 1969) was a Norwegian chess player, Norwegian Chess Championship winner (1951).

== Biography ==
Harry Kongshavn was born in Hitterø Municipality in Lister og Mandal county, Norway. He was the son of a fisherman. He worked as an electrician at Elektrisk Bureau, and built illegal radios in Oslo during the Second World War as a member of the Norwegian resistance group Wiedswang.

In the late 1940s and begin 1950s, Harry Kongshavn was one of the leading Norwegian chess players. In 1951, he won Norwegian Chess Championship.

Harry Kongshavn played for Norway in the Chess Olympiad:

- In 1950, at fourth board in the 9th Chess Olympiad in Dubrovnik (+3, =0, -7).

He died at age 70.
