= Svein Johannessen =

Norwegian chess player (1937–2007)

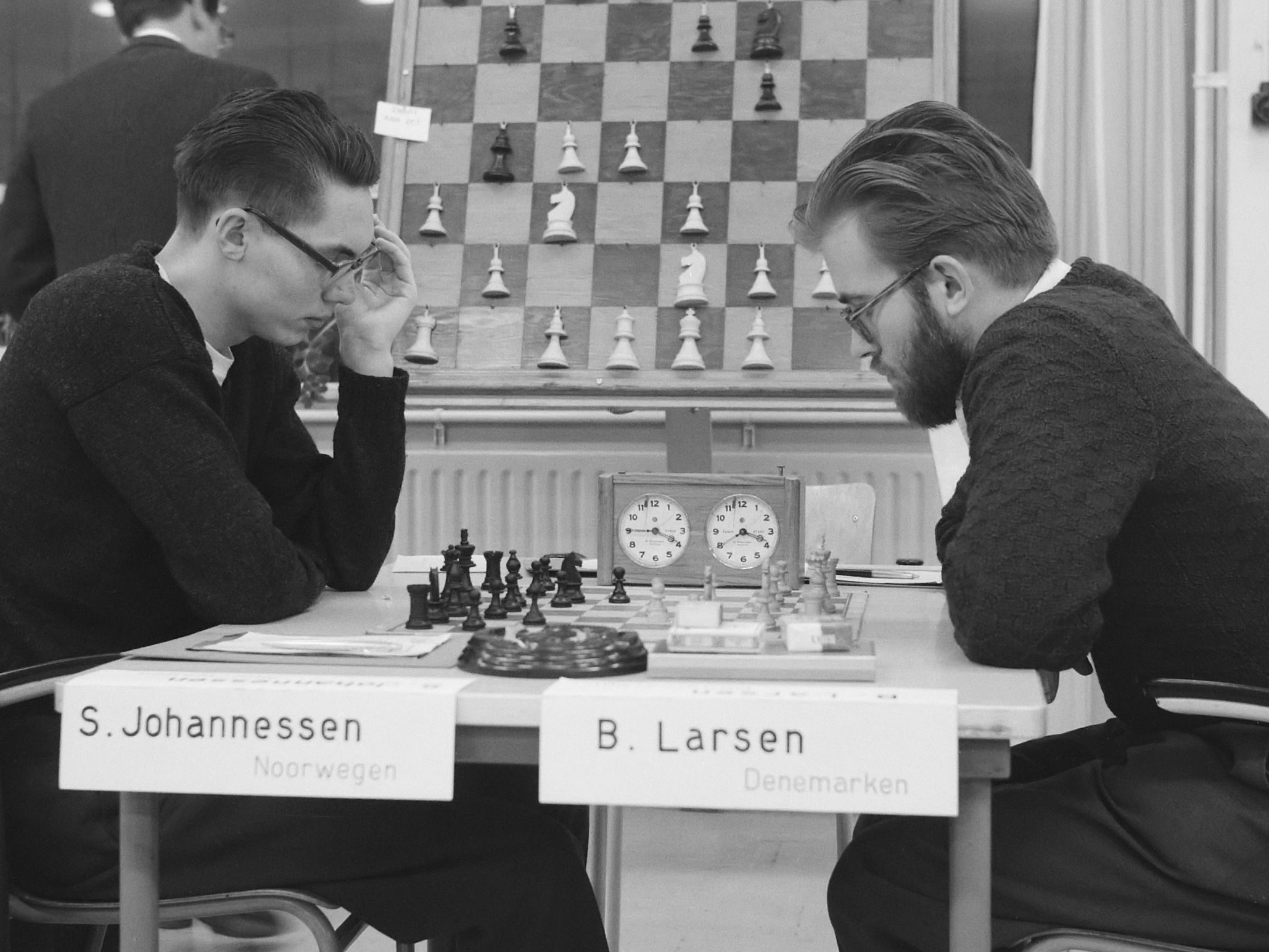
Svein Johannessen and Bent Larsen (1960)

Svein Johannessen (17 October 1937 – 27 November 2007) was a Norwegian chess player. He became Norway's second International Master, after Olaf Barda, in 1961. He won four Norwegian Chess Championships, in 1959, 1962, 1970 and 1973.

According to ChessBase, Johannessen had a wide opening repertoire. He played most of the regular opening moves with White with some frequency, 1.d4, 1.e4, 1.c4 and 1.Nf3. With Black against 1.e4 he frequently entered the "open" games with 1...e5, but often played the Sicilian Defence as well. Against 1.d4 Johannessen also played several things including the Old Indian Defense and Queen's Gambit Accepted.

== Literature ==
- Øystein Brekke: Sjakkmesteren Svein Johannessen, Norsk Sjakkforlag, Drammen 2009 ISBN 978-82-90779-05-9
