= Frode Elsness =

Norwegian chess player (born 1973)

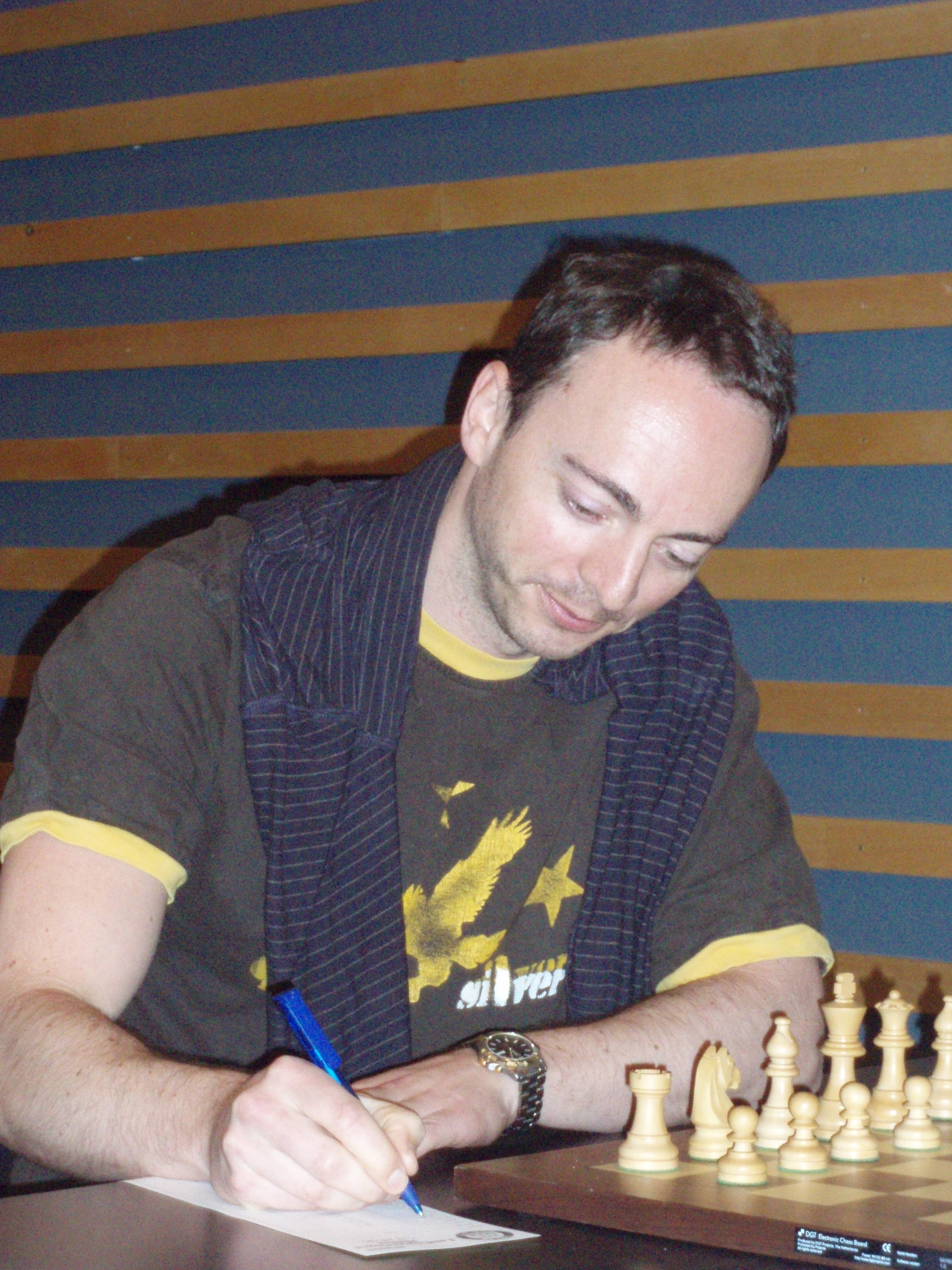

Personal information
- Born: June 15, 1973 (age 53)

Chess career
- Country: Norway
- Title: International Master (2001)
- FIDE rating: 2405 (September 2026)
- Peak rating: 2506 (November 2011)

Frode Elsness (born June 15, 1973) is a Norwegian chess player who holds the title of International Master, as well as the 2008 Norwegian Chess Championship. Elsness plays for the chess club in Moss. Apart from chess, Elsness is a medical doctor.

Elsness was away from chess after dropping out of the Gausdal Classics tournament in 2001. The cause was an incident in the fifth-round game. Elsness' return to organized chess came in 2004, where he finished fourth in the Norwegian championship. In 2007, Elsness won the Open Norwegian Championship for rapid chess.

Elsness' first Norwegian Chess Championship came in 2008. Elsness and Jon Ludvig Hammer both finished with 6.5/9 points in the main event in Tønsberg in July. The play-off between the two players was arranged September 26–27 in Moss. Elsness won the first game with White, and held the draw with Black, securing a 1.5-0.5 victory, and his first championship trophy.

Six times Elsnes has represented Norway in the Chess Olympiad: 1996 (second reserve), 2000 (board two), 2004 (second reserve), 2010 (board 3), 2012 (board 1) and 2014 (in group B, at board 2).

== Incident in 2001 ==
Elsness was playing in the Gausdal Classics tournament in 2001. There was an incident in the fifth-round game against Kristian Trygstad, where Elsness was trying to win a rook and pawn versus rook endgame. Theoretically, the position should have been drawn, but Trygstad was in time trouble, and had asked the arbiter to declare the game drawn based on article 10.2 of the laws of chess, which allows the arbiter to end the game if the opponent is "making no effort to win the game by normal means". The arbiter Hans Olav Lahlum postponed the decision and watched the game's progress before granting Trygstad's claim when his time expired. Elsness played round 6, but dropped out of the tournament in protest against the decision in the Trygstad game.
