= Jon Ludvig Hammer =

Norwegian chess grandmaster (born 1990)

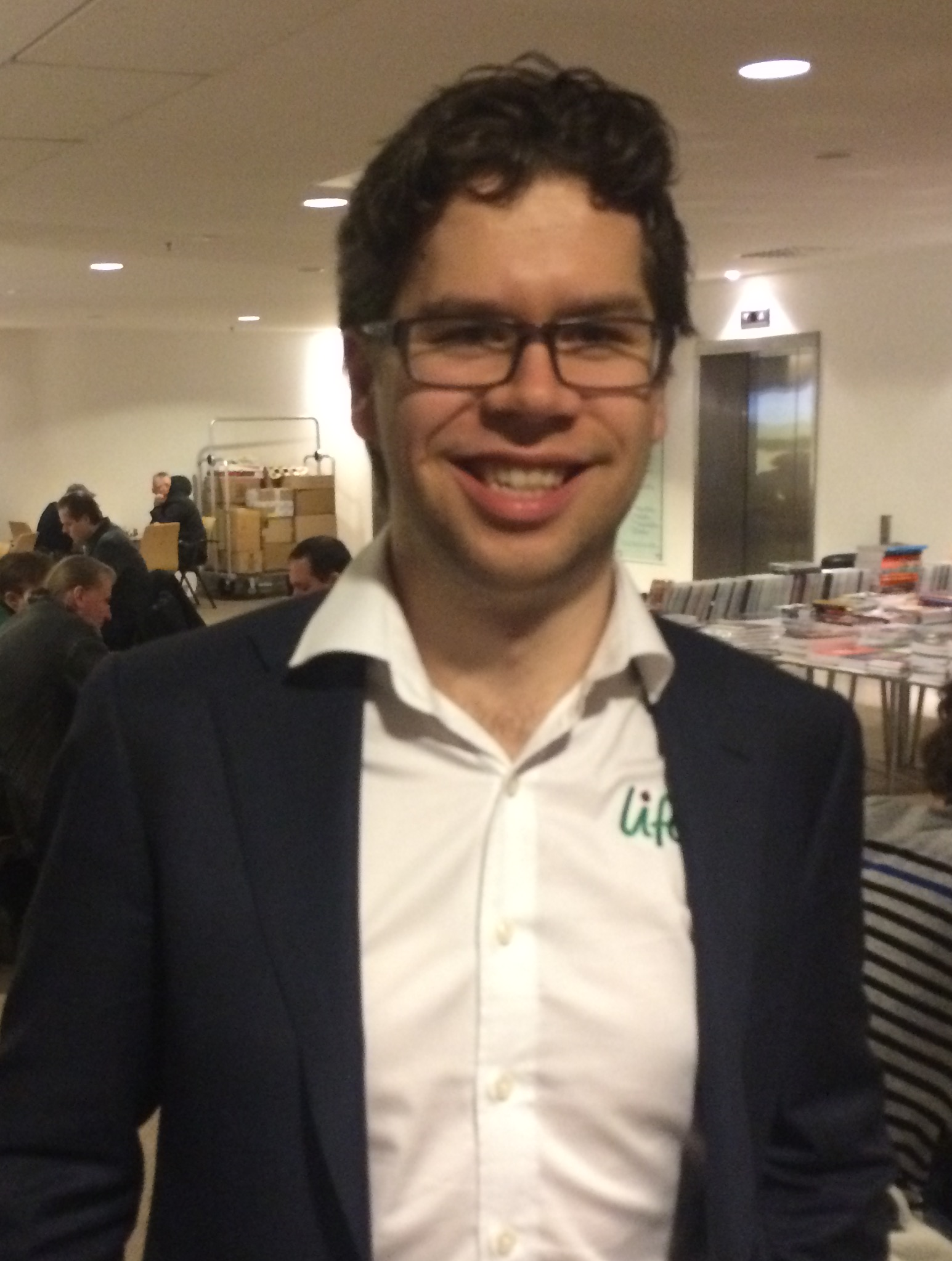

Personal information
- Born: Jon Ludvig Nilssen Hammer; 2 June 1990 (age 36) Bergen, Norway

Chess career
- Country: Norway
- Title: Grandmaster (2009)
- FIDE rating: 2574 (July 2026)
- Peak rating: 2705 (February 2016)
- Peak ranking: No. 40 (February 2016)

Jon Ludvig Nilssen Hammer (born 2 June 1990) is a Norwegian chess grandmaster and four-time Norwegian Chess Champion. He was the main second for Magnus Carlsen in the World Chess Championship 2013.

== Chess career ==
At the 38th Chess Olympiad in Dresden, Hammer represented Norway as the substitute player (number five on the team). He played in all rounds except the first and scored 6/10 (+4−2=4).

In 2007, Hammer completed all requirements for the International Master title. Hammer gained his first GM norm in the Cappelle-la-Grande Open in 2007, the second in Denmark in 2008, and a third in European Chess Club Cup later that year. The short length of those tournaments, however, meant he needed a fourth norm to gain the GM title. This norm was achieved when Hammer won outright a jubilee tournament at Gjøvik arranged at the end of 2008 and the beginning of 2009. In the final round against Mateusz Bartel, Hammer could have secured his Grandmaster title with a draw. In spite of this, he eschewed several opportunities for a perpetual check, and successfully took aim at sole first place. He was awarded the grandmaster title in March 2009.

Hammer scored a 2792 rating performance on Norway's top board during the 2009 European Team Chess Championship in Novi Sad, where his +4−0=5 score made him one of the top individual scorers.

In 2011, Hammer suffered setbacks in the "B" section of the Tata Steel Chess Tournament, and the Aeroflot Open. He rebounded with a good result in the Reykjavik Open, where he finished with 7/9, and in 5th place on tiebreaks. As the best Nordic player, Hammer became Norway's first Nordic Chess Champion since Simen Agdestein in 1992.

Hammer won his first Norwegian Chess Championship in 2013 when he scored 7/9 (+5−0=4). Hammer's best result until then had been the 2008 championship, when he finished equal on points with Frode Elsness, but he lost the September playoff to Elsness after losing the first game, and acquiescing to a draw in a worse position in the second. In 2013/14, Hammer took a clear first place with 7½/9 in the Rilton Cup. Hammer also won the Norwegian Championships of 2017, 2018, and 2025.

Hammer attended the Norwegian College of Elite Sport and was coached by Agdestein. Hammer has been described as taking chess very seriously, playing very often online, in tournaments, or practicing. In 2009, Hammer announced he would not pursue a professional chess career and would study economics. In 2012, he switched to journalism, writing for Science Nordic as part of his degree studies.

He won the Xtracon Chess Open in 2016 and 2018.

In 2019, he published the educational video series "1.e4 A Complete White Repertoire".

In 2023, he made his Chessable debut, releasing an opening repertoire for black based on the Nimzo-Indian defence.
