= Arne Kroghdahl =

Norwegian chess player

Personal information
- Born: 25 February 1909
- Died: 10 May 1988 (aged 79)

Chess career
- Country: Norway

Arne Sverre Birger Krogdahl (25 February 1909 – 10 May 1988) was a Norwegian chess player, Norwegian Chess Championship winner (1937).

== Biography ==
In the begin of 1930s Arne Kroghdahl was one of the leading Norwegian chess players. In 1937, in Trondheim he won the Norwegian Chess Championship. Also he won the Norwegian Blitz Chess Championships many times.

Arne Kroghdahl played for Norway in the Chess Olympiad:

- In 1930, at fourth board in the 3rd Chess Olympiad in Hamburg (+0, =2, -11).
