= Norwegian Chess Championship =

Annual chess tournament held in Norway

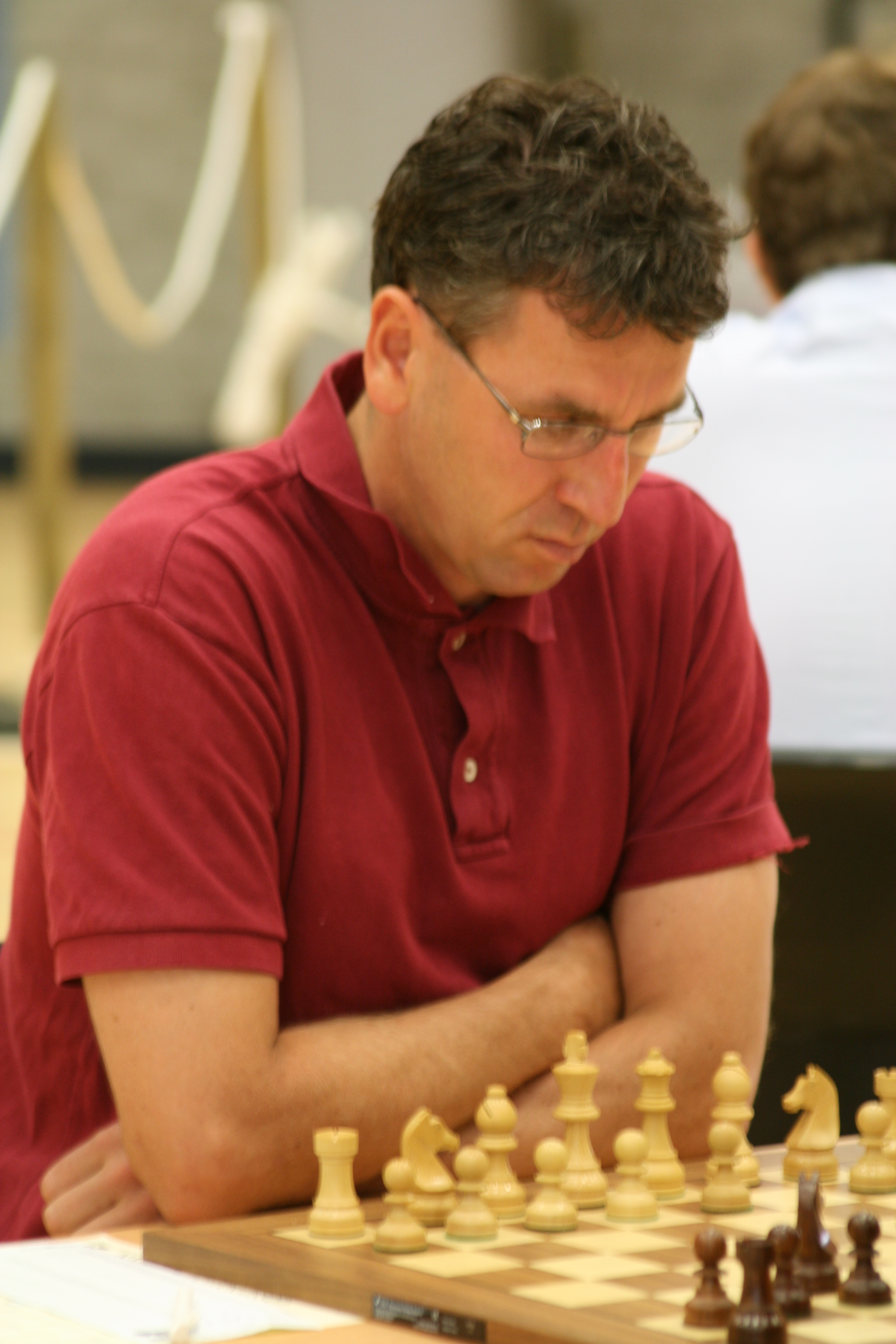
Simon Agdestein at the Norwegian Chess Championship in Bergen (July 2009)

The Norwegian Chess Championship (NM i sjakk) is an annual tournament held in Norway during the month of July, in order to determine the national chess champion. The tournament is held at different venues each year as part of the Landsturnering (National tournament). Clubs may bid for this tournament, which is awarded by the Norwegian Chess Federation (Norges Sjakkforbund).

== Past events and champions ==
This table summarizes all past championship events. The tournament was not held in 1928 and 1939 due to the Nordic Championships being held in Oslo those years, nor was there any event between 1940 and 1944, when Norway was occupied by Nazi Germany. The 2020 tournament was scheduled to be in Stjørdal but was cancelled due to the COVID-19 pandemic.

The number of participants is the number of players in the entire Landsturnering, not just the championship section. The champions are listed along with the club they represented when they won the championship. Titles decided by play-off matches due to equal scores in the main tournament are noted.

Year	City	Champion and club	Participants
1918	Kristiania (Oslo)	Josef Lilja, CS (Christiania Schakselskab)	30
1919	Kristiania (Oslo)	Jac. A. Brekke, CS	30
1920	Kristiania (Oslo)	Jac. A. Brekke, CS	32
1921	Bergen	H. G. Hansen, CS (after play-offs)	27
1922	Kristiania (Oslo)	A. M. Erichsen, CS	30
1923	Kristiania (Oslo)	Jac. A. Brekke, CS	30
1924	Kristiania (Oslo)	Leif F. D. Lund, CS	49
1925	Oslo	Jac. A. Brekke, SK Centrum, Oslo	66
1926	Bergen	Hans Christian Christoffersen, Drammens SK (after play-offs)	50
1927	Trondheim	H. G. Hansen, OSS (Oslo Schakselskap)	40
1929	Drammen	Hans Christian Christoffersen, Drammens SK	33
1930	Oslo	Olaf M. Olsen (later Olaf Barda), SK Odin, Oslo (after play-offs)	45
1931	Stavanger	Andreas Gulbrandsen, Moss SK	35
1932	Bergen	Eugen Johnsen, SK Odin	58
1933	Fredrikstad	Trygve Halvorsen, OSS (after play-offs)	48
1934	Hamar	Trygve Halvorsen, OSS	42
1935	Sandefjord	Jørgen Saurén, OSS	48
1936	Oslo	Hans Christian Christoffersen, Drammens SK	60
1937	Trondheim	Arne S.B. Krogdahl, OSS	31
1938	Grimstad	Oluf Kavlie-Jørgensen, Bergens SK	53
1945	Oslo	Ernst Rojahn, Tønsberg SK (after play-offs)	132
1946	Bergen	Erling Myhre, OSS (after play-offs)	109
1947	Kristiansand	Olaf Barda, OSS	79
1948	Fredrikstad	Olaf Barda, OSS (after play-offs)	96
1949	Oslo	Aage Vestøl, OSS	125
1950	Trondheim	Erling Myhre, OSS	96
1951	Stavanger	Harry Kongshavn, OSS	127
1952	Skien	Olaf Barda, OSS	165
1953	Fredrikstad	Olaf Barda, OSS	160
1954	Drammen	Einar Haave, Stavanger SK	120
1955	Stabekk	Erling Myhre, OSS	113
1956	Steinkjer	Otto Birger Morcken, OSS	94
1957	Lillehammer	Olaf Barda, OSS	148
1958	Ålesund	Ernst Rojahn, Tønsberg SK	111
1959	Oslo	Svein Johannessen, OSS	131
1960	Fredrikstad	Daan de Lange, Hamar SS	108
1961	Sandefjord	Per Ofstad, Bergens SK	145
1962	Hamar	Svein Johannessen, OSS	174
1963	Moss	Ragnar Hoen, OSS	156
1964	Oslo	Arne Zwaig, OSS	143
1965	Mosjøen	Arne V. Gulbrandsen, OSS	112
1966	Bodø	Paul Svedenborg, Narvik SK	160
1967	Bergen	Paul Svedenborg, Narvik SK	130
1968	Oslo	Arne V. Gulbrandsen, OSS	202
1969	Hamar	Arne Zwaig, OSS	178
1970	Kristiansund	Svein Johannessen, OSS	156
1971	Skien	Terje Wibe, OSS (after play-offs)	214
1972	Røros	Erling Kristiansen	270
1973	Sandnes	Svein Johannessen, SK Fischer	326
1974	Sandefjord	Leif Øgaard, OSS	378
1975	Oslo	Leif Øgaard, OSS	327
1976	Harstad	Knut J. Helmers, SK Stjernen	215
1977	Bergen	Knut J. Helmers, SK Stjernen	330
1978	Risør	Ragnar Hoen, OSS	375
1979	Molde	Leif Øgaard, OSS	419
1980	Oslo	Sverre Heim, Akademisk SK	546
1981	Kirkenes	Ragnar Hoen, OSS	226
1982	Lillehammer	Simen Agdestein, Asker SK (after play-offs)	417
1983	Trondheim	Bjørn Tiller, OSS	377
1984	Oslo	Berge Østenstad, Asker SK	427
1985	Gausdal	Leif Øgaard, Brugata SK	299
1986	Steinkjer	Simen Agdestein, OSS	297
1987	Kristiansand	Jonathan Tisdall, Brugata SK (after play-offs)	437
1988	Asker	Simen Agdestein, OSS	564
1989	Randaberg	Simen Agdestein, OSS	446
1990	Brønnøysund	Berge Østenstad, Asker SK	334
1991	Gjøvik	Jonathan Tisdall, Brugata SK	587
1992	Kristiansund	Einar Gausel, OSS	463
1993	Oslo	Leif Øgaard, OSS	588
1994	Drammen	Berge Østenstad, Asker SK	519
1995	Namsos	Jonathan Tisdall, Nordstrand SK	433
1996	Alta	Einar Gausel, OSS	299
1997	Stavanger	Berge Østenstad, Asker SK	486
1998	Oslo	Roy H. Fyllingen, Bergens SK	537
1999	Gausdal	Berge Østenstad, Asker SK (after play-offs)	414
2000	Asker	Simen Agdestein, NTG (after play-offs)	427
2001	Kristiansund	Einar Gausel, OSS	420
2002	Røros	Simen Agdestein, NTG	549
2003	Fredrikstad	Berge Østenstad, Asker SK	623
2004	Molde	Berge Østenstad, Asker SK (after play-offs)	520
2005	Sandnes	Simen Agdestein, NTG (after play-offs)	583
2006	Moss (Mossehallen)	Magnus Carlsen, NTG (after play-offs)	533
2007	Hamar (Scandic Hotel)	Espen Lie, Porsgrunn (after play-offs)	501
2008	Tønsberg (Slagenhallen)	Frode Elsness, Moss (after play-offs)	471
2009	Bergen (Haukelandshallen)	Kjetil Aleksander Lie, Porsgrunn	513
2010	Fredrikstad	Kjetil Aleksander Lie, Porsgrunn (after play-offs)	485
2011	Oslo(Njårdhallen)	Berge Østenstad, Asker SK (after play-offs)	496
2012	Sandefjord	Frode Olav Olsen Urkedal, SK 1911 (after play-offs)	437
2013	Lillehammer	Jon Ludvig Hammer, OSS	490
2014	Trondheim	Frode Olav Olsen Urkedal, SK 1911	503
2015	Oslo (Oppsal Arena)	Aryan Tari, Vålerenga SK	671
2016	Tromsø	Johan Salomon, Nordstrand	378
2017	Stavanger	Jon Ludvig Hammer, OSS	606
2018	Sarpsborg	Jon Ludvig Hammer	544
2019	Larvik	Aryan Tari	526
2021	Oslo (Note: The tournament was originally to be held in Bergen, but was cancelled due to the COVID-19 pandemic. A tournament with only the championship section was instead held in Oslo.)	Kristian Stuvik Holm, Vålerenga SK	26
2022	Kongsvinger	Simen Agdestein, OSS	384
2023	Oslo	Simen Agdestein, OSS	686
2024	Gol (Storesund Resort Hotel)	Aksel Bu Kvaløy, Stavanger	514
2025	Bergen	Jon Ludvig Hammer	592
2026	Kristiansund	Elham Amar, OSS	512
2027	Hamar		

== Rules for participation and other classes ==
The rules for participation are governed by the Norwegian Chess Federation (NSF).

The championship ("Elite") section is restricted to the top-rated players. In order to play for the most prestigious title of national chess champion, a player must meet at least one of the following criteria:

- Won the Norwegian Championship in one of the three preceding years.
- Finished third or better in last year's championship.
- Won the national championship in the Junior section the previous year.
- Finished first or second in the Candidate Elite section (the second highest section, immediately below Elite) the previous year.
- Have a sufficiently high Elo rating (as of 2025 the lower limit is 2400).
- Been deemed otherwise eligible for participation by the Elite Committee of the Norwegian Chess Federation.

In general, an even number of participants is sought in the championship section to prevent byes from occurring.

However, the Landsturnering has several sections for lower-rated players, as well as sections for different age groups. In general, players must be members of the Norwegian Chess Federation, or a club affiliated with the federation, although exceptions may be made if the person is a member of another national chess federation. To be eligible for a championship title, a player must either be a Norwegian citizen or have been a resident of Norway for the past year.

The current regulations provide for the following sections below the Elite section:

- Candidate Elite (rating 2200 - 2399)
- Master (rating 2000 - 2199)
- Class 1 (rating 1800 - 1999)
- Class 2 (rating 1600 - 1799)
- Class 3 (rating under 1600)
- Senior 50 (over 50)
- Senior 65 (over 65)
- Senior B (over 50, rating under 1600)
- Junior A (age under 20)
- Junior B (age under 20, rating under 1800)
- Cadet A (age under 16)
- Cadet B (age under 16, rating under 1800)
- Lilleputt (age under 13)
- Miniputt (age under 11)

The Senior, Junior and Cadet categories are split into an "A" and "B" group by rating, but are combined if either of the groups has fewer than 10 participants. Qualification for the classes with a lower age limit ("Senior") require that the player reach that age before 31 December of that year, while the classes with an upper age limit require that the player be under the age limit on 1 January of that year.

A player cannot be required to play in a higher class than what the last rating list indicates; however, a player may elect to play up if a sufficiently high rating was obtained on any of the monthly official rating lists during the year. In addition, players may elect to play in a higher section if they scored at least 60% in that same class the previous year, if they were in the top 7% of the class below the previous year, or if they won the Norwegian Grand Prix tournament series for the rating class below in the previous year. In addition, winners of the individual circuit championships and the champion of Northern Norway are automatically qualified for play in the Master class, regardless of rating. The top two finishers of the Candidate Elite class qualify for next year's Elite section.

== Arrangement ==
Since 1997, the championship section has had approximately 20 players. If there are at least 16 players, it is arranged as a nine-round Monrad tournament, a system similar to the Swiss system tournament. The official Norwegian Chess Federation policies also allow the tournament to be arranged as a round-robin with 10 or 12 players. From 2013 the regular Swiss system has been used in the Championship section, and is an alternative to the Monrad in the other sections.

If two or more players are tied for points at the end of the tournament, the tiebreak rules depend on the system used. In 2007, when the tournament was arranged as a Monrad, a modified Buchholz system was used, where the first tiebreak is the sum of a player's opponents' scores, except the two weakest. If still tied, the second weakest and then the weakest scores were added to the tiebreak points. If still tied, the Neustadtl score, that is the sum of defeated opponents' scores plus half of drawn opponents' scores, were used. In 2015, when the Swiss System was used in all sections, the tiebreaks, in order, were median Buchholz (strongest and weakest opponents discounted), Buchholz -1 (weakest opponent discounted), regular Buchholz, and finally the average rating of opponents.

Prior to 2014 the Championship, Junior, Cadet and Senior sections, a tied score resulted in a play-off for the title within 60 days after the end of the main tournament. The rules of the play-off changed several times. A rule change in 2013 abolished the play-off entirely effective from the 2014 tournament.
