= Olaf Barda =

Norwegian chess player

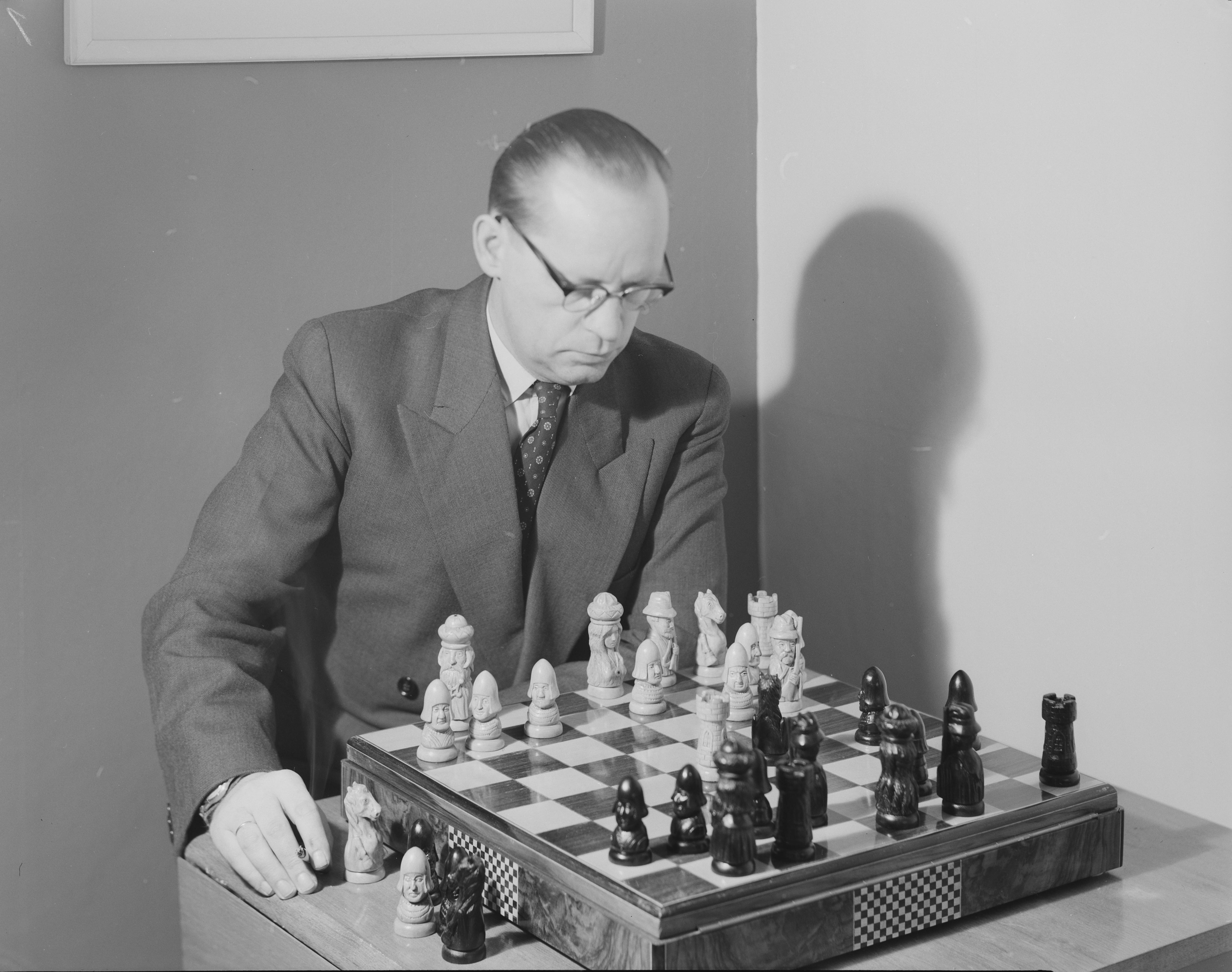
- Barda in 1958
- Country: Norway
- Born: 17 August 1909
- Died: 2 May 1971 (aged 61); Oslo, Norway
- Title: International Master (1952); Grandmaster (1953)

Olaf Barda (17 August 1909 – 2 May 1971 in Oslo), born Olaf M. Olsen, was a Norwegian chess player. He was the first Norwegian awarded the chess title of International Master, which he received in 1952.

Barda won the Norwegian Chess Championship six times, 1930 (still with the name Olsen), 1947, 1948, 1952, 1953, and 1957.

Barda authored the Norwegian instruction manual "Sjakk!", and wrote the chess column for the newspaper Dagbladet.

Barda was also a strong correspondence chess player, winning the Norwegian correspondence chess championships in 1946 and 1949/1950. He received the title of Correspondence Chess Grandmaster in 1953 and finished fourth in the First World Correspondence Chess Championship played between 1950 and 1953. This was the best Norwegian result in that contest until Ivar Bern won the 17th championship in 2006.

According to ChessBase, Barda usually opened with 1.d4 when he was playing White. With black against 1.e4 Barda played several variations of the Sicilian Defence (1...c5), but occasionally played 1...d6 (the Pirc Defense) or 1...e5 allowing the Ruy Lopez. Against 1.d4 his repertoire was varied, playing such openings such as the Old Indian Defense, Nimzo-Indian Defense and Slav Defense.

His eldest son Yngvar Barda (1935–1999) also was chess master, participant of 12th Chess Olympiad.
