= Norwegian Chess Federation =

National chess federation

- Formation: 1914
- Headquarters: Oslo, Norway
- Affiliations: FIDE, ECU
- Website: sjakk.no

The Norwegian Chess Federation (Norwegian: Norges Sjakkforbund, often abbreviated as NSF) is the national federation of chess in Norway. It was founded in 1914. The current chairman is Anniken Vestby.

The organisation's headquarters are in Oslo. It is an affiliate of the World Chess Federation. The Norwegian Chess Federation organizes the Norwegian Chess Championship and publishes The Norwegian Chess Magazine.

== See also ==
- European Chess Union
