= Simen Agdestein =

Norwegian chess grandmaster and footballer (born 1967)

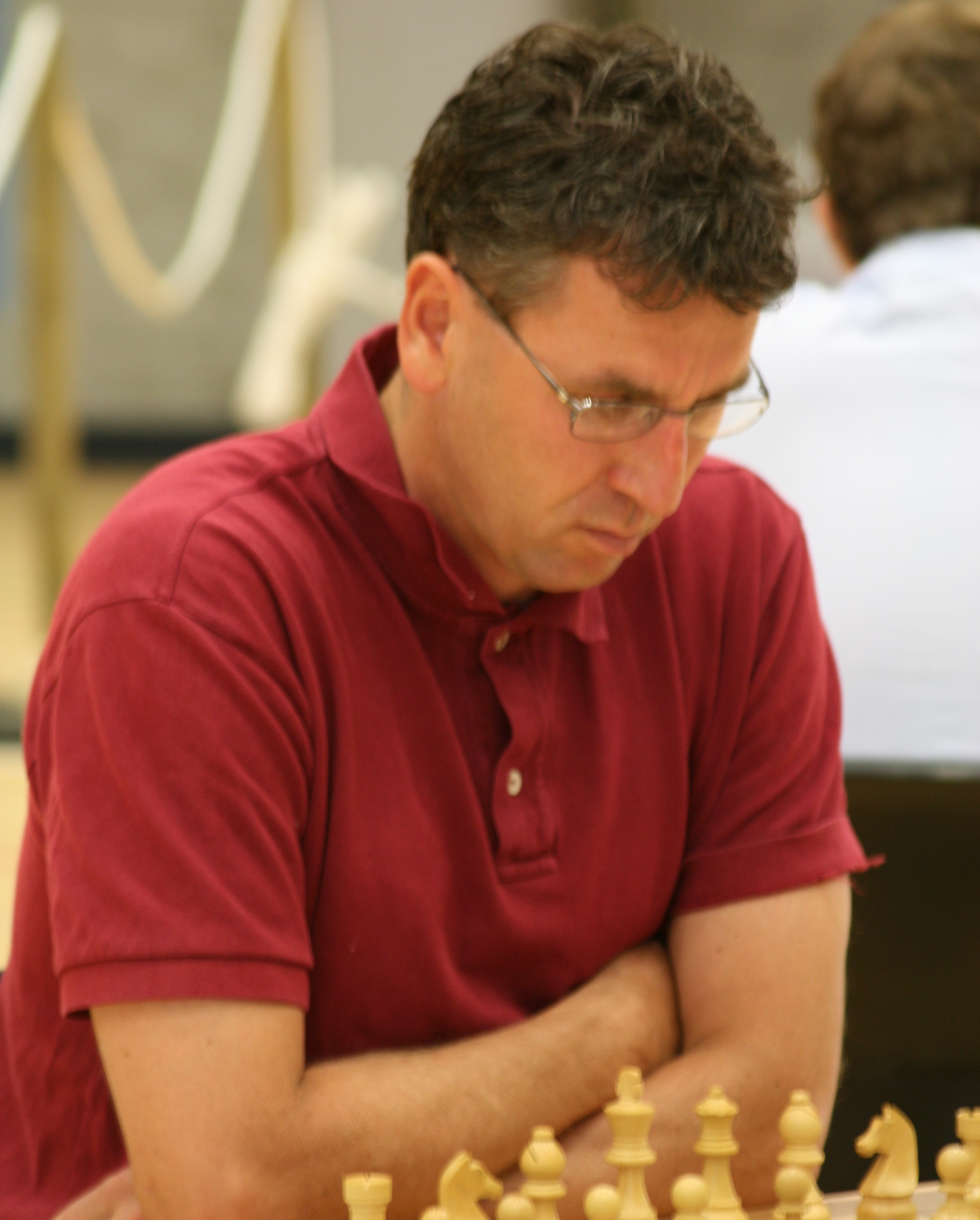
- Agdestein at the Norwegian Chess Championship in Bergen, July 2009
- Born: 15 May 1967 (age 59); Asker, Norway
- Spouse: Marianne Aasen (m. 1996; div. 2008)
- Chess career
- Title: Grandmaster (1985)
- FIDE rating: 2516 (November 2026)
- Peak rating: 2637 (July 2014)
- Peak ranking: No. 16 (July 1989)
Association football career
- Height: 1.88 m (6 ft 2 in)
- Position: Forward
Senior career*
Years	Team	Apps	(Gls)
1984–1992	Lyn	92	(37)
International career
1988–1989	Norway	8	(1)
- * Club domestic league appearances and goals

Simen Agdestein (born 15 May 1967) is a Norwegian chess grandmaster, chess coach, author, and former professional footballer as a striker for the Norway national football team.

Agdestein won nine Norwegian Chess Championships between 1982 and 2023. He is also the former coach of Magnus Carlsen, and brother of Carlsen's former manager, Espen Agdestein. He has written and co-written several books on chess, including a biography of Carlsen.

== Chess career ==
Agdestein became Norwegian national champion at the age of 15, an International Master at 16 and a grandmaster at 18.

On a local level, his regular dominance of the Nordic and Norwegian Chess Championships during the 1980s amply demonstrated that there were few players who could resist his enterprising and inventive style. In international competition, he finished second at the 1986 World Junior Championship behind Walter Arencibia and ahead of Evgeny Bareev, Viswanathan Anand and Jeroen Piket. A little later, his Elo rating rose to over 2600.

In the late 1980s, Agdestein combined top-flight chess with a full-time football career, representing his country at both. In the early 1990s, a knee injury cut short his football activities. In 1999, Agdestein returned to winning ways, topping the Cappelle la Grande tournament that year and the Isle of Man tournament in 2003. Agdestein scored two tournament victories in 2013, when he won the Open Sant Martí in Barcelona with 8½ points out of 9 possible, with a rating performance of 2901, and the Oslo Chess International-Håvard Vederhus' Memorial with 7 points out of 9.

Agdestein has represented his country seven times at the Chess Olympiad, mostly playing first board and winning an individual (board 4) gold medal at his first appearance in 1982.

As a player of the white pieces, he shows a preference for the queen pawn openings, while with Black, favours the Ruy Lopez, Dutch Defence and Semi-Open Games.

Agdestein works at the sports academy Norges Toppidrettsgymnas, where he teaches chess and football. He has been a chess coach to many young talents, including world champion Magnus Carlsen.

His handle on the Internet Chess Club (ICC) is "Gruk".

== Football career ==
Club performance			League		Cup		Total	
Season	Club	League	Apps	Goals	Apps	Goals	Apps	Goals
Norway			League		Norwegian Cup		Total	
1984	Lyn Oslo	2. divisjon (A)	2	0	-		2	0
1985	Lyn Oslo	3. divisjon (A)	4	1	-		4	1
1986	Lyn Oslo	3. divisjon (B)	4	1	-		4	1
1987	Lyn Oslo	2. divisjon (A)	19	8	-		19	8
1988	Lyn Oslo	2. divisjon (A)	17	13	1	0	18	13
1989	Lyn Oslo	2. divisjon (B)	17	5	-		17	5
1990	Lyn Oslo	2. divisjon (B)	17	8	3	0	20	8
1991	Lyn Oslo	Tippeligaen	2	0	-		2	0
1992	Lyn Oslo	Tippeligaen	10	1	2	6	12	7
Total	Norway		92	37	6	6	98	43
Career total			92	37	6	6	98	43

== Personal life ==
He was born in Oslo as a son of civil engineer Reidar Frank Agdestein (1927–2002) and secretary Unni Jørgensen (1934–). He is a maternal grandson of runner and botanist Reidar Jørgensen. In 1995, he was awarded a master's degree from the Department of Political Science at the University of Oslo. In October 1996, he married Marianne Aasen, a later Member of Parliament. The couple had three children, but separated in 2008.

== Bibliography ==
Source: BIBSYS

=== As an author or co-author ===
- Sjakkleksjoner med Simen Agdestein (1987)
- GATT, u-landene og miljøet : rapport fra en konferanse i Oslo 20. og 21. oktober 1994 (1994)
- Regionalt samarbeid versus apartheid : SADCC-landenes bestrebelser på å redusere transportavhengigheten til Sør-Afrika på 1980-tallet (1995) (Master thesis, University of Oslo)
- Simens sjakkbok (1997)
- Et hefte om internasjonalisering (1998)
- Den unge sjakkspiller (2001)
- Sjakk: Fra første trekk til sjakkmatt (2002)
- Wonderboy : how Magnus Carlsen became the youngest chess grandmaster in the world : the story and the games (2004)
- Sjakk (2007)

=== Books about Agdestein ===
- Arne Danielsen, Bjarte Leer-Salvesen, Bjarke Sahl, Atle Grønn. Simen Agdestein (2008)
- Atle Grønn (2024). Games and Goals. New In Chess. ISBN 978-908-33479-8-1
