= Spyridon Skembris =

Greek chess grandmaster (born 1958)

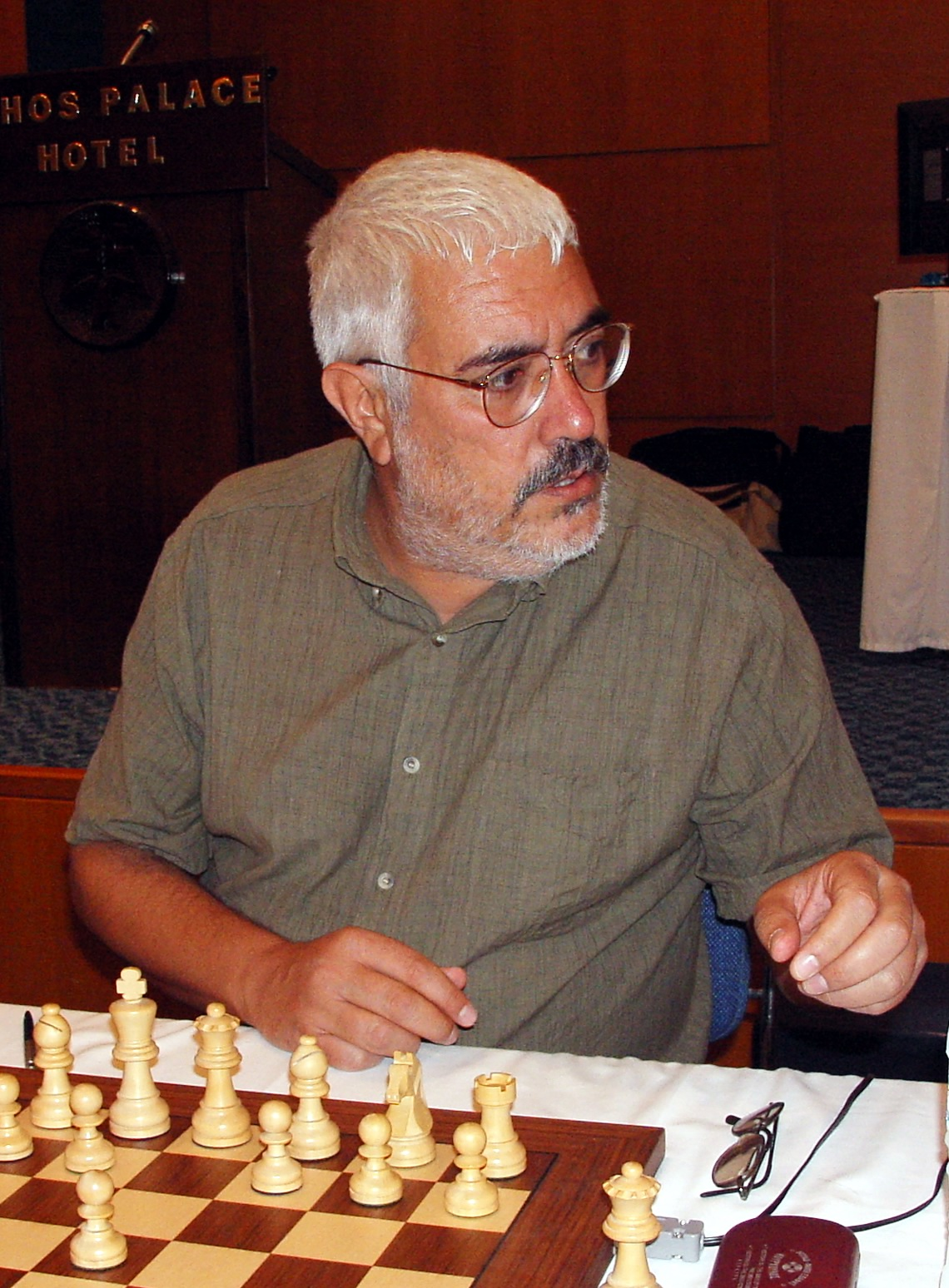
- Spyridon Skembris in 2008

Personal information
- Born: 22 February 1958 (age 68) Corfu, Greece

Chess career
- Country: Greece
- Title: Grandmaster (1990)
- Peak rating: 2565 (January 1993)
- Peak ranking: No. 95 (January 1993)

Spyridon Skembris (Greek: Σπυρίδων Σκέμπρης; born 22 February 1958) is a Greek chess Grandmaster (1990), four-time Greek Chess Championship winner (1981, 1984, 1989, 1993).

== Chess career ==
In the 1980s and until the mid-1990s, Spyridon Skembris was one of the top Greek chess players. He competed many times in the individual finals of the Greek Chess Championship, winning the title of national champion four times (in 1981, 1984, 1989 and 1993).

He achieved his first significant success in the international arena in 1977, sharing the 3rd place (behind Artur Yusupov and Alonso Zapata, together with Petar Popović, Reynaldo Vera González-Quevedo and Jens Ove Fries-Nielsen) in the World Junior Chess Championship (U20 age group) in Innsbruck. In the following years, he achieved successes, among others in:

- Athens (1988, tournament Acropolis International chess tournament, shared 1st place together with Vasilios Kotronias and 1989, shared 1st place together with Vasilios Kotronias and Evgeni Vasiukov),
- Montpellier (1989, shared 2nd place behind Miodrag Todorcevic, together with Zdenko Kožul),
- Komotini (1992, shared 1st place together with Ilya Smirin, Jaan Ehlvest, Tony Miles and Boris Alterman),
- Gausdal (1993, Anold Cup tournament, shared 1st place together with Sergei Tiviakov),
- Karditsa (1994, shared 2nd place behind Suat Atalık, together with Vasilios Kotronias),
- Limassol (1997, shared 1st place together with Krum Georgiev, Igor Miladinović and Efstratios Grivas),
- Montecatini Terme (1999, shared 1st place together and 2000, 1st place),
- Bratto (Lombardia) (1999, shared 2nd place behind Vladimir Epishin, together with Erald Dervishi, Siniša Dražić and Mišo Cebalo and 2000, 2nd place behind Vladimir Epishin, together with Erald Dervishi, Renzo Mantovani and Mišo Cebalo),
- Antalya (2001, 2nd place behind Stelios Halkias),
- Istanbul (2001, shared 2nd place behind Hristos Banikas, together with Dejan Bojkov),
- Kavala (2005, shared 1st place together with Suat Atalık and Eduardas Rozentalis),
- Cesenatico (2007, shared 2nd place behind Igors Rausis, together with, among others, Milko Popchev and Lexy Ortega).

Spyridon Skembris played for Greece in the Chess Olympiads:

- In 1980, at second board in the 24th Chess Olympiad in La Valletta (+3, =7, -2),
- In 1982, at first board in the 25th Chess Olympiad in Lucerne (+4, =4, -3),
- In 1984, at first board in the 26th Chess Olympiad in Thessaloniki (+5, =3, -5),
- In 1986, at second board in the 27th Chess Olympiad in Dubai (+4, =7, -2),
- In 1988, at second board in the 28th Chess Olympiad in Thessaloniki (+2, =7, -3),
- In 1990, at second board in the 29th Chess Olympiad in Novi Sad (+2, =8, -2),
- In 1992, at second board in the 30th Chess Olympiad in Manila (+4, =3, -5),
- In 1994, at first board in the 31st Chess Olympiad in Moscow (+6, =4, -3).

Spyridon Skembris played for Greece in the European Team Chess Championships:

- In 1989, at second board in the 9th European Team Chess Championship in Haifa (+2, =5, -2),
- In 1992, at second board in the 10th European Team Chess Championship in Debrecen (+4, =5, -0) and won individual gold medal.

In 1981, Spyridon Skembris was awarded the FIDE International Master (IM) title and received the FIDE Grandmaster (GM) title nine years later. He achieved the highest rating in his career on January 1, 1993, with a score of 2565 points, he shared 95th place on the FIDE world list, while also taking 1st place among Greek chess players. From 2013 he is FIDE Trainer.
