= Pavlidou =

Pavlidou is a surname. Notable people with the surname include:

- Ekaterini Pavlidou (born 1993), Greek chess player
- Maria Pavlidou (born 1978), Greek tennis player
- Vasiliki Pavlidou, Greek astrophysicist
