= Maria Kouvatsou =

Greek chess player (born 1979)

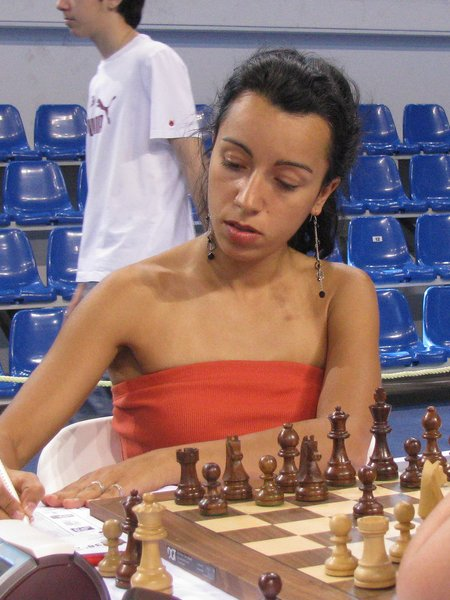
- Maria Kouvatsou playing in the Greek Team Chess Championship in Peristeri 2010.

Personal information
- Born: November 2, 1979 (age 46) Athens, Greece

Chess career
- Country: Greece
- Title: Woman Grandmaster (1999)
- FIDE rating: 2095 (March 2015)
- Peak rating: 2235 (July 2003)

Maria Kouvatsou (Greek: Μαρία Κουβάτσου; born November 2, 1979, in Athens, Greece) is a Greek chess Woman Grandmaster (WGM). She was the 1999 World Under-20 Girl's Chess Championship winner, won the Greek Women's Chess Championship in 2000, and has represented Greece in three Chess Olympiads.

== Early life ==
When she was five years old, Kouvatsou was taught to play chess by her father, and her family moved to Chania, Crete. There was no chess club in Chania at the time.

== Chess career ==
Kouvatsou won the Greek Under-16 Girl's Chess Championship in 1992 (jointly) and 1994, and won the Greek Under-20 Girl's Chess Championship in 1995, 1996 and 1999.

She represented Greece in the Girl's World Youth Chess Championship in Bratislava 1993, Szeged 1994, Guarapuava 1995 (where she finished equal third), and Yerevan 1997. She also played in the Girl's World Junior Chess Championship in Kozhikode 1998, and won the event in Yerevan 1999. She was awarded the title of Woman Grandmaster (WGM) for this result. She also represented Greece in the Girl's European Youth Chess Championship in the years 1994 to 1997.

She represented Greece in three Chess Olympiads, in Elista 1998, Istanbul 2000, and Bled 2002.

Kouvatsou scored 8/9 to win the 23rd Greek Women's Chess Championship in Methana 2000. She finished second, behind Anna-Maria Botsari, in the 2002 event played in Athens.

In April 2001, she drew a rapid play exhibition match against former World Chess Champion Anatoly Karpov in Rethymno, scoring 1:1 after winning the first game. Kouvatsou qualified to play in the Women's World Chess Championship 2001 in Moscow later that year, but was eliminated in round 1 by Nataša Bojković.

She plays with the Greek Team AO Kydon Chania and has won the Greek Team Chess Championship with them in 2000, 2001, 2002, 2003, and 2004. She played with the team in the European Men's Chess Club Cup in 2001, and the European Women's Chess Club Cup in 2003. She also represented Greece in the European Women's Team Chess Championship in León, Spain 2001.

Kouvatsou competed in the European Women's Chess Championship in Varna 2002, Istanbul 2003, Saint Petersburg 2009, and Rijeka 2010. She also competed in the 7th Mediterranean Chess Championship in Rijeka 2009.

== Personal life ==
Kouvatsou completed her degree in dentistry in Athens, and worked as a dental surgeon until 2009, when she was offered a position at the Ministry of Foreign Affairs. Since early 2012 she has worked at the Greek Embassy in Beijing.
