= Sotirios Malikentzos =

Greek chess player

Personal information
- Born: 1 July 1992 (age 34)

Chess career
- Country: Greece
- Title: International Master (2017)
- FIDE rating: 2437 (July 2026)
- Peak rating: 2450 (November 2018)

Sotirios Malikentzos (Greek: Σωτήριος Μαλικέντζος; born 1 July 1992) is a Greek chess International Master (2017), Greek Chess Championship winner (2013).

== Chess career ==
In 2013 in Greek Chess Championship Sotirios Malikentzos shared 1st-3rd place with Athanasios Mastrovasilis and Vasilios Kotronias, and received the title of champion based on best additional coefficient. Also he is bronze medalist at the 2019 Greek Chess Championship. In 2012 he participated in European Individual Chess Championship and World Junior Chess Championship.

Sotirios Malikentzos played for Greece-2 in the European Team Chess Championship:

- In 2017, at reserve board in the 21st European Team Chess Championship in Hersonissos (+0, =4, -1).

In 2000, Sotirios Malikentzos was awarded the FIDE Master (FM) title and received the FIDE International Master (IM) title six years later.
