= Pavlidis =

Pavlidis (Greek: Παυλίδης, lit. '"the son of Pavlos"', sometimes transliterated as Pavlides) is a Greek patronymic surname, equivalent to English Paulson. Notable people with the surname include:

- Antonios Pavlidis (born 1993), Greek chess grandmaster
- Aristotelis Pavlidis (1943–2022), Greek politician and government minister
- Charalampos Pavlidis (born 1991), Greek association footballer
- Elias Pavlidis (born 1978), Greek boxer
- Giorgos Pavlidis (politician) (1956–2016), Greek politician and regional governor
- Jordanis Pavlides (1903–1985), British contract bridge player
- Panagiotis Pavlidis (died 1968), Greek shooter
- Theodosios Pavlidis (born 1934), computer scientist
- Spyros B. Pavlides, Greek geologist and professor
- Vangelis Pavlidis (born 1998), Greek association footballer
- Vasilios Pavlidis, (born 1897, date of death unknown), Greek wrestler
