= Anastasopoulos =

Anastas(s)opoulos (Greek: Αναστασόπουλος), with the female form being Anastas(s)opoulou (Αναστασοπούλου) is a Greek surname. It is the surname of:

- Anastasios Anastasopoulos, Greek chess master.
- Andreas Anastasopoulos (born 1976), Greek athlete in the shot put.
- Dimitrios Anastasopoulos (born 1990), Greek association football player.
- Georgios Anastassopoulos (1935–2019), Greek lawyer and politician.
- Mitsos Anastasopoulos, Greek politician and member of the Fourth National Assembly at Argos.
- Nikolaos Anastasopoulos (born 1979), Greek association football player.
- Thanos Anastasopoulos, Greek filmmaker.
