= Efrosini Kasioura =

Greek chess player

Personal information
- Born: 11 February 1957
- Died: 8 December 2010 (aged 53)

Chess career
- Country: Greece
- Title: Woman FIDE Master (1985)
- Peak rating: 2194 (January 2000)

Efrosini (Froso) Kasioura (Greek: Ευφροσύνη (Φρόσω) Κασιούρα; 11 February 1957 – 8 December 2010) was a Greek chess Woman FIDE Master (1985). She is a Greek Women's Chess Championship winner (1986).

== Chess career ==
Efrosini Kasioura won the Greek Women's Chess Championship in 1986 (shared 1st-2nd places with Anna-Maria Botsari, both chess players received the title of champion).

Efrosini Kasioura two times played for Greece in the Women's Chess Olympiads (1984-1986).

In 1987 and 1993 Efrosini Kasioura participated in Women's World Chess Championships zonal tournaments.

She died after a serious illness. The obituary of the Greek Chess Federation noted her fighting spirit and aggressive playing style. In January 2011, a tournament in her memory was held in Kallithea.
