= Mastrovasilis =

Mastrovasilis (Greek: Μαστροβασίλης) is a Greek surname. Notable people with the surname include:

- Athanasios Mastrovasilis (born 1979), Greek chess master
- Dimitrios Mastrovasilis (born 1983), Greek chess master
