= Pepelillo's Mas =

Pepelillo's Mas is an archaeological deposit of the deposit of Pepelillo-2 (Agullent), located to the band southern center of the Vall d'Albaida, between the calcareous slopes of Agullent's Saw and the fluvial terraces of the river d'Ontinyent, the Clariano. The landscape is made up of calcareous saws of the cretaceous, orientated south west by south east (SO – SE), that delimit this and other valleys which are filled by the marly sediments of the Miocene, and which have been subjected to successive periods of incision, emptying, and filling throughout the Plio-Quaternary, as result of the fluvial dynamics and neo-tectonic activity.

== Bibliography ==
- Pascual Beneyto J., Ribera. A, Barberà. M., Ferrer. C., Carrión. Y., López. L., Hortelano. I., Pérez Jordá G. (2016). ´´Un nucli de Sitges calcolítiques al Mas de Pepelillo (Agullent)´´. Serie de Trabajos Varios 119 . Del neolític a l´edat del bronze en el Mediterrani Occidental: estudis en homenatge a Bernat Martí Oliver. TV SIP 119. pp. 287–310.
