= Grigoriou =

Grigoriou (Greek: Γρηγορίου) is a Greek surname. Notable people with the surname include:

- Georgios Grigoriou (1871–unknown), Greek athlete
- Grigoris Grigoriou (1919–2005), Greek screenwriter and film director
- Michalis Grigoriou (born 1973), Greek professional football manager
- Miltiadis Grigoriou (born 1935), Greek chess master
