= Balaskas =

Balaskas is a surname. Notable people with the surname include:

- Janet Balaskas, South African author and childbirth educator
- Panayotis Balaskas (born 1946), Greek chess master
- Peter A. Balaskas (born 1969), American author of speculative fiction
- Xen Balaskas (1910–1994), South African cricketer
