= Eva Kondou =

Greek chess player

Personal information
- Born: 24 March 1965 (age 61) Athens

Chess career
- Country: Greece
- Title: Woman International Master (1986)
- Peak rating: 2260 (January 1995)

Evangelia Kondou (Greek: Ευαγγελία Κοντού; born 24 March 1965) is a Greek chess Woman International Master (1986). She is a four-times Greek Women's Chess Championship winner (1984, 1985, 1987, 1992).

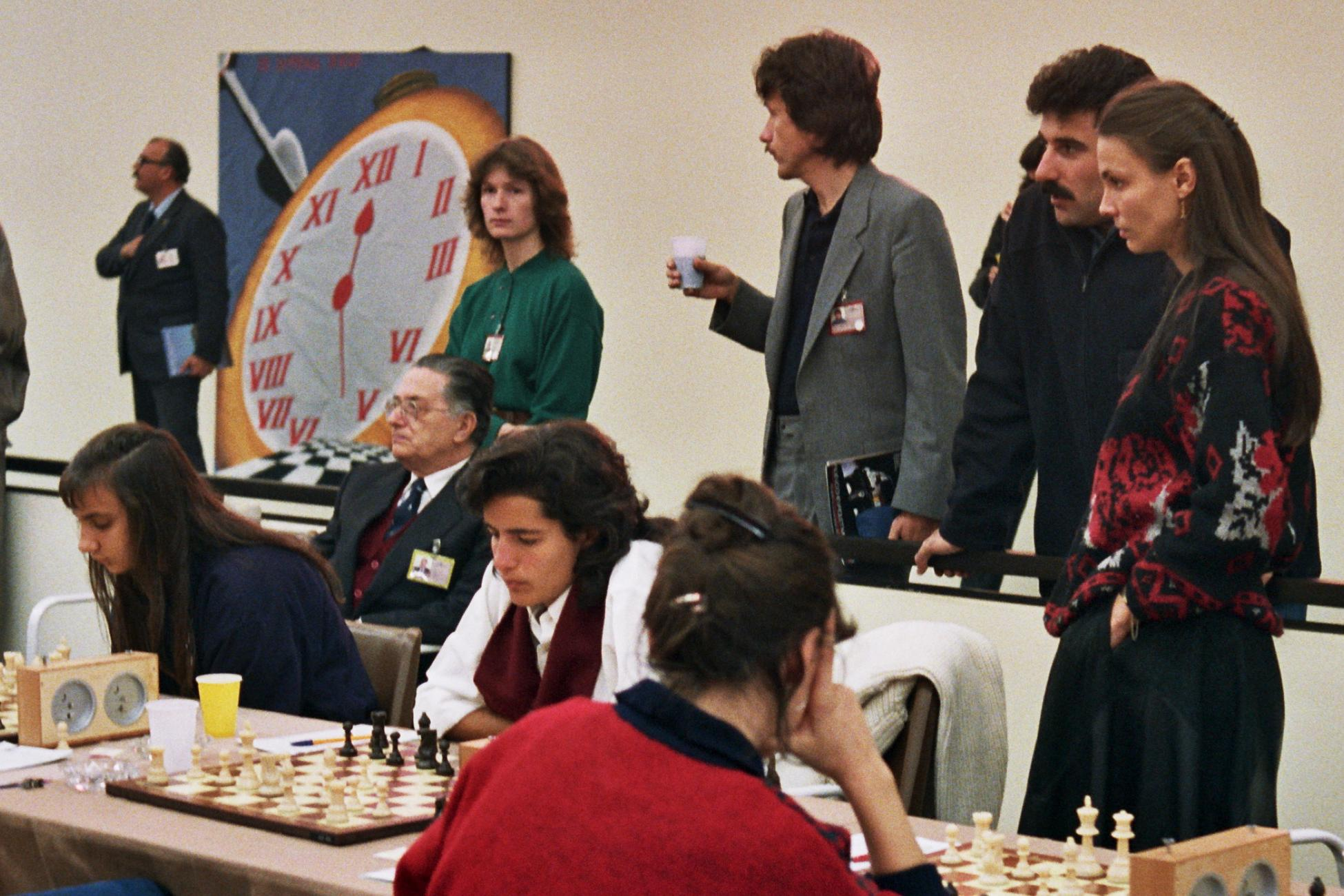
Greek women's team at the 1988 Chess Olympiad. Seated: Anna-Maria Botsari (left) and Eva Kondou (center). On the right is Marina Makropoulou.

== Chess career ==
Eva Kondou won the four Greek Women's Chess Championships: 1984, 1985, 1987, and 1992. In 1994 she won silver medal in this tournament.

Eva Kondou seven times played for Greece in the Women's Chess Olympiads (1982–1994). She also five times played for Greece in the Women's Chess Balkaniads (1982–1985, 1990) and in the European Women's Team Chess Championship in 1992.

In 1990 and 1991 Eva Kondou participated in Women's World Chess Championships zonal tournaments.

In 1986, she was awarded the FIDE Women International Master (WIM) title.

== Personal life ==
She permanently resides in Santorini with International Master Panayiotis Frendzas and has three children.
