= Panagopoulos (surname) =

Panagopoulos (Greek: Παναγόπουλος) is a Greek surname. Notable people with the surname include:

- Andreas Panagopoulos (1883–1952), Greek politician
- Costas Panagopoulos, American political scientist
- Leonidas Panagopoulos (born 1987), Greek footballer
- Nicolas Panagopoulos (born 1954), Greek composer
- Panayotis Panagopoulos (1916–unknown), Greek chess player
- Pericles Panagopoulos (1935–2019), Greek shipping magnate
- Theo Ryuki Panagopoulos (born 1995), Japanese footballer
