= Kokkoris =

Kokkoris (Greek: Κόκκορης) is a Greek surname. Notable people with the surname include:

- Aristidis Kokkoris (born 1998), Greek footballer;
- Hristos Kokkoris (born 1942), Greek chess master.
