= Katerina Nika =

Greek chess player

Personal information
- Born: 30 December 1962 (age 63)

Chess career
- Country: Greece
- Peak rating: 2065 (January 1987)

Katerina Nika (Greek: Αικατερίνη Νίκα; born 30 December 1962) is a Greek chess player. She is a two-times Greek Women's Chess Championship winner (1982, 1983).

== Chess career ==
Katerina Nika won the two Greek Women's Chess Championships in row (1982, 1983).

Katerina Nika six times played for Greece in the Women's Chess Olympiads (1982, 1984, 1988). She also played for Greece in the Women's Chess Balkaniads in 1982, 1983 and 1984.

In 1981 Katerina Nika participated in Women's World Chess Championships zonal tournament. In 1987 she participated in international chess women's tournament in Nałęczów.
