= Miltiadis Grigoriou =

Greek chess player

Personal information
- Born: 23 March 1935 (age 91)

Chess career
- Country: Greece
- Title: International Master (1975)

Miltiadis Grigoriou (Greek: Μιλτιάδης Γρηγορίου; born 23 March 1935) is a Greek chess International Master (1975), Greek Chess Championship winner (1974).

== Chess career ==
In the 1970s, Miltiadis Grigoriou was one of the leading Greek chess players. In 1974 he won Greek Chess Championship. In 1978 he won 3rd place in International Chess tournament in Kallithea, scored 6½ out of 11, one and a half points behind the tournament winners Petar Velikov and Krum Georgiev.

Miltiadis Grigoriou played for Greece in the Men's Chess Balkaniads:

- In 1975, at second board in the 7th Men's Chess Balkaniad in Istanbul (+1, =2, -1),
- In 1976, at second board in the 8th Men's Chess Balkaniad in Athens (+1, =2, -1) and won individual bronze medal,
- In 1977, at sixth board in the 9th Men's Chess Balkaniad in Albena (+0, =2, -2) and won individual bronze medal,
- In 1979, at sixth board in the 11th Chess Balkaniad in Bihać (+1, =2, -2).

In 1975, Miltiadis Grigoriou was awarded the FIDE International Master (IM) title.
