= Konstantinos Hadziotis =

Greek chess player

Personal information
- Born: unknown
- Died: unknown

Chess career
- Country: Greece

Konstantinos Hadziotis (Greek: Κωνσταντίνος Χατζιώτης) was a Greek chess player, Greek Chess Championship winner (1963).

== Biography ==
In the mid-1960s Konstantinos Hadziotis was one of Greek leading chess players. In 1963 he won the Greek Chess Championship.

Konstantinos Hadziotis played for Greece in the Chess Olympiads:

- In 1962, at second reserve board in the 15th Chess Olympiad in Varna (+3, =1, -4),
- In 1964, at fourth board in the 16th Chess Olympiad in Tel Aviv (+4, =4, -5).

Konstantinos Hadziotis participated in chess tournaments until the 1980s, after which there is no information about his life.
