= Maria Petraki =

Greek chess player

Personal information
- Born: 21 August 1962 (age 63)

Chess career
- Country: Greece
- Title: Woman FIDE Master (2005)
- Peak rating: 2145 (January 2003)

Maria Petraki (Greek: Μαρία Πετράκη; born 21 August 1962) is a Greek chess Woman FIDE Master (2005). She is a three-times Greek Women's Chess Championship winner (1981, 1989, 1993).

== Chess career ==
Maria Petraki won the three Greek Women's Chess Championships (1981, 1989, 1993) but in 1990 and 1995 she won bronze medal in this tournaments.

Maria Petraki six times played for Greece in the Women's Chess Olympiads (1980, 1984, 1988, 1990, 1994 and 1996; in 1988 she played for the 2nd team; in the main team she usually acted as a reserve). She also played for Greece in European Women's Team Chess Championships and in the Women's Chess Balkaniads in 1979 and 1981.

In 1990, 1991, 1993 and 1999 Maria Petraki participated in Women's World Chess Championships zonal tournaments.
