= Ioannis Papadopoulos (chess player) =

Greek chess grandmaster (born 1988)

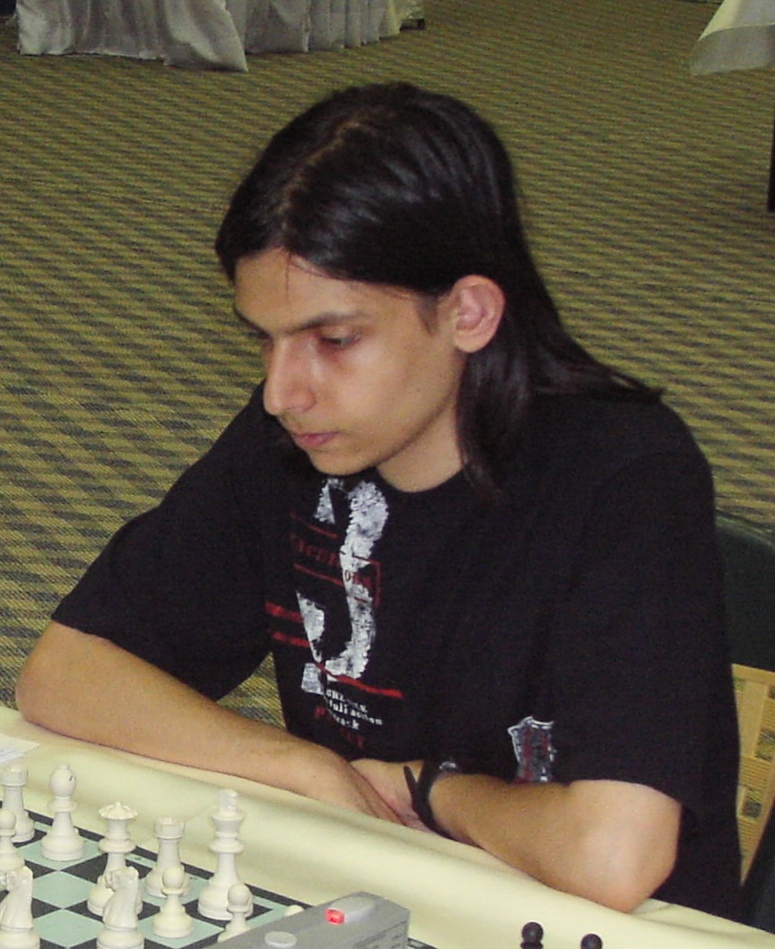
- Ioannis Papadopoulos at the World Junior Chess Championship in 2008

Personal information
- Born: April 12, 1988 (age 38)

Chess career
- Country: Greece
- Title: Grandmaster (2009)
- Peak rating: 2490 (July 2008)

Ioannis K. Papadopoulos (Greek: Γιάννης Παπαδόπουλος; born 1988) is a Greek chess player holding the title of Grandmaster. In the year, 2007, the untitled Papadopoulos won the Greek Chess Championship in Igoumenitsa with 7.5/9.0, a full two points ahead of the runner up. He played for Greece's top board at the 2008 Chess Olympiad.

Presently, he is playing for Greek chess club Keraunos Oraiokastrou. Additionally, he played on the first board for them in six out of seven games of the 2012 Alpha Ethniki Qualifying Group, scoring four wins and two draws.

Following his team's qualification to the 2012 Alpha Ethiniki Championship (they achieved 1st place in the 2012 Alpha Ethniki Qualifying Group), he once again played in the first board for them at the 2012 Alpha Ethniki Championship, scoring 2.5/7 points with a Rating Performance of 2411, as Keraunos Oraiokastrou achieved a 5th-place finish in 32 teams, being seeded 8th before the tournament began.
