= Triantafyllos Siaperas =

Greek chess player (1932–1994)

Personal information
- Born: 1 August 1932
- Died: 25 February 1994 (aged 61)

Chess career
- Country: Greece
- Title: International Master (IM)

Triantafyllos Siaperas (Greek: Τριαντάφυλλος Σιαπέρας; 1 August 1932 – 25 February 1994) was a Greek chess International Master (IM), two-times Greek Chess Championship winner (1956, 1972).

== Biography ==
From the end of 1950s to the mid-1970s Triantafyllos Siaperas was one of Greek leading chess players. He twice won Greek Chess Championship: in 1956, and 1972. In 1968, in Athens Triantafyllos Siaperas participated in World Chess Championship European Zonal Tournament where ranked in 16th place.

Triantafyllos Siaperas played for Greece in the Chess Olympiads:

- In 1956, at first board in the 12th Chess Olympiad in Moscow (+4, =3, -8),
- In 1968, at second board in the 18th Chess Olympiad in Lugano (+3, =5, -5),
- In 1970, at first board in the 19th Chess Olympiad in Siegen (+7, =4, -4),
- In 1972, at first board in the 20th Chess Olympiad in Skopje (+4, =3, -8).

Triantafyllos Siaperas played for Greece in the European Team Chess Championship preliminaries:

- In 1973, at first board in the 5th European Team Chess Championship preliminaries (+0, =2, -1).

Triantafyllos Siaperas played for Greece in the Men's Chess Balkaniads:

- In 1972, at first board in the 4th Men's Chess Balkaniad in Sofia (+1, =0, -3),
- In 1973, at first board in the 5th Men's Chess Balkaniad in Poiana Brașov (+0, =3, -0).
