= Artemis Fouriki =

Greek chess player

Chess career
- Country: Greece

Artemis Fouriki (Greek: Άρτεμις Φουρίκη) is a Greek chess player. She is a three-time Greek Women's Chess Championship winner (1978, 1979, 1980).

== Chess career ==
Artemis Fouriki won the first three Greek Women's Chess Championships held after a 30-year break (1978, 1979, 1980); the first official Greek Chess Championship for women was held in 1947.

Artemis Fouriki played for Greece in the 24th Chess Olympiad in 1980. In this competition, held in Valletta, she played on the 1st board. She played 10 games, of which she won 3, lost 4 and drew 3. She also took part in the Women's Chess Balkaniads in 1978 and 1979 for Greece. In the 1978 tournament, held in Băile Herculane, she won 1 game and lost 3 games. In the 1979 tournament held in Bihać she was able to score only ½ a point in 4 games.
