= Georgios Gaitanaros =

Greek chess player

Personal information
- Born: 1918
- Died: 1987 (aged 68–69)

Chess career
- Country: Greece

Georgios Gaitanaros (Greek: Γιώργος Γαϊτάναρος; 1918–1987) was a Greek chess player. He won the Greek Chess Championship three times (1951, 1952, 1953).

== Biography ==
In the 1950s Georgios Gaitanaros was a leading Greek chess player. He won the Greek Chess Championships three-times in a row: from the 1951 to the 1953.

Georgios Gaitanaros played for Greece in the Chess Olympiad:

- In 1952, at first board in the 10th Chess Olympiad in Helsinki (+3, =2, −6).
