= Ioannis Papaioannou =

Greek chess grandmaster (born 1976)

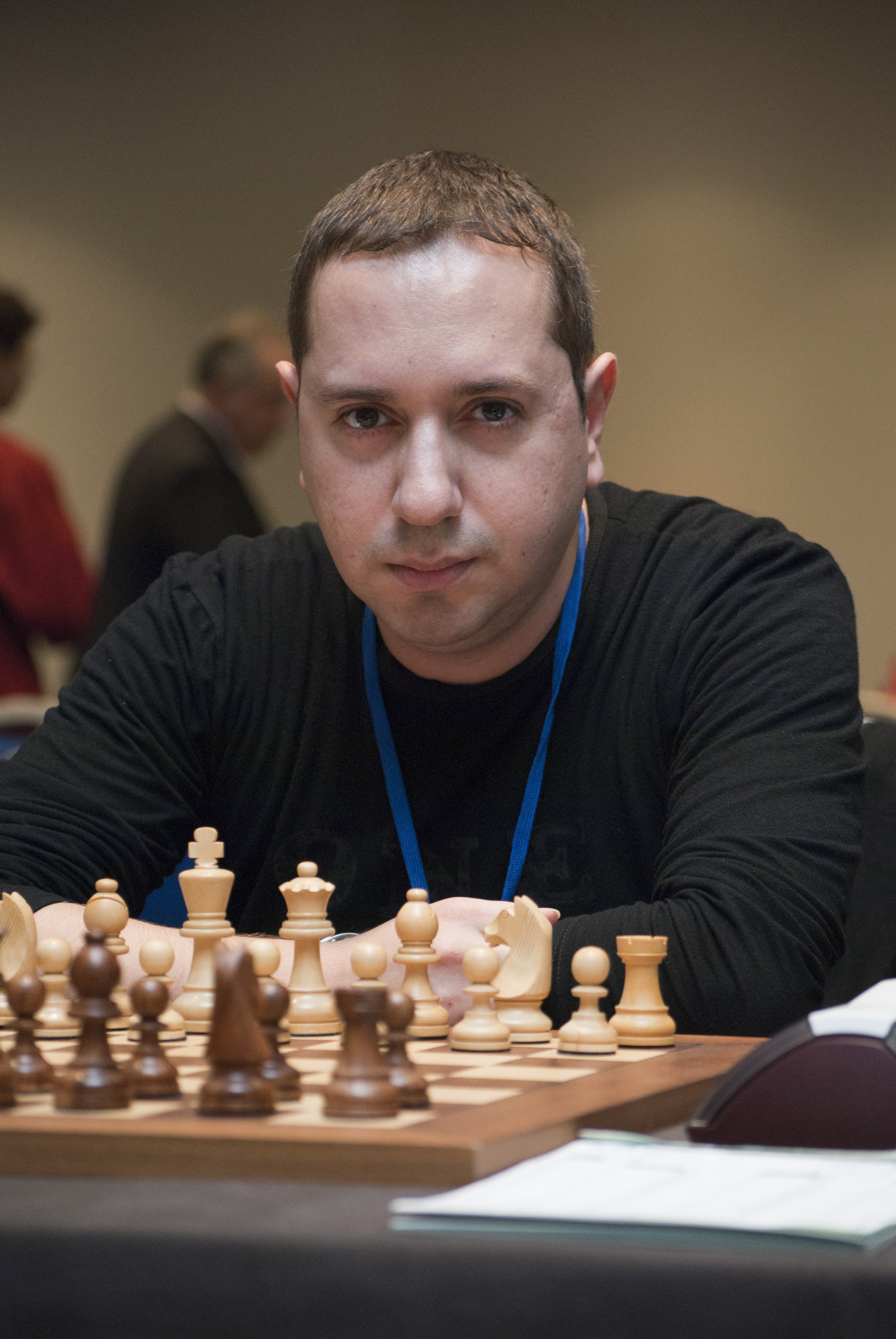
- Ioannis Papaioannou, 2011

Personal information
- Born: 20 April 1976 (age 50) Athens, Greece

Chess career
- Country: Greece
- Title: Grandmaster (1998)
- FIDE rating: 2611 (July 2026)
- Peak rating: 2652 (August 2017)
- Peak ranking: No. 85 (January 2002)

Ioannis Papaioannou (Greek: Ιωάννης Παπαϊωάννου; born 20 April 1976) is a Greek chess grandmaster. He is a four-time Greek Chess Champion.

== Chess career ==
Born in 1976, Papaioannou earned his grandmaster title in 1998. He won the Greek Chess Championship in 1997, 1998, 1999, and 2007. He is the No. 1 ranked Greek player as of September 2023.
