= Fotis Mastihiadis =

Greek chess player

Personal information
- Born: 6 February 1913 Ayvalık, Ottoman Empire
- Died: 17 August 1997 (aged 84) Athens, Greece

Chess career
- Country: Greece

Fotis Mastihiadis (Greek: Φώτιος Μαστιχιάδης; 6 February 1913 – 17 August 1997) was a Greek chess player, and the winner of the 1949 Greek Chess Championship.

== Biography ==
In the 1950s Fotis Mastihiadis was a leading Greek chess player. In 1949, he won Greek Chess Championship.

Fotis Mastihiadis played for Greece in the Chess Olympiads:

- In 1950, at first board in the 9th Chess Olympiad in Dubrovnik (+0, =3, -10),
- In 1952, at fourth board in the 10th Chess Olympiad in Helsinki (+1, =5, -5),
- In 1956, at first reserve board in the 12th Chess Olympiad in Moscow (+1, =1, -5).

He worked as engraver and cartoonist.
