= Ioulia Makka =

Greek chess player

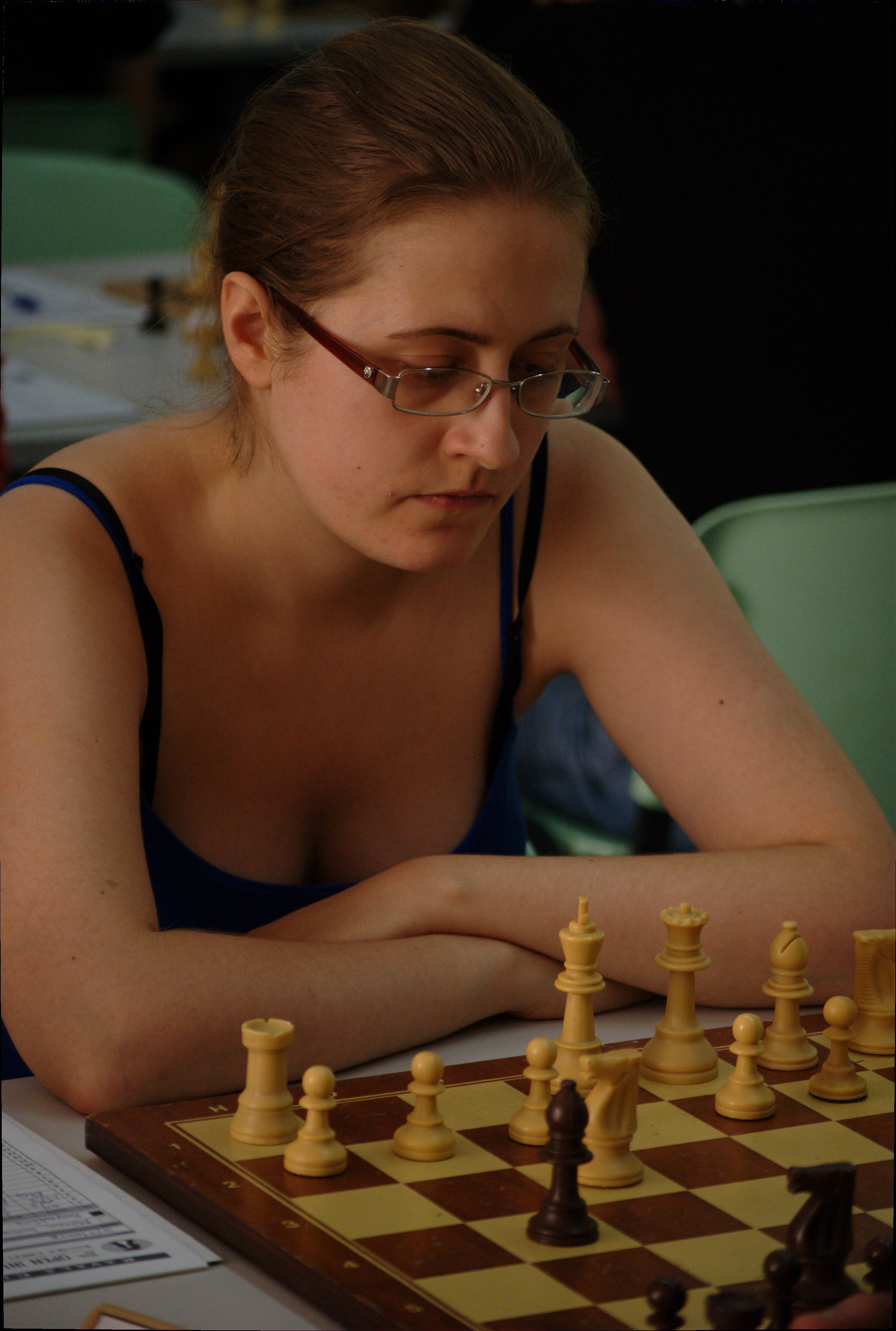
- Ioulia_Makka in 20th open chess tournament "Kavala 2011"

Personal information
- Born: 10 December 1983 (age 42)

Chess career
- Country: Greece
- Title: Woman International Master (2002)
- Peak rating: 2275 (July 2003)

Ioulia Makka (Greek: Ιουλία Μάκκα; born 10 December 1983) is a Greek chess player who holds the FIDE title of Woman International Master (WIM, 2002). She is a Greek Women's Chess Championship winner (2018).

== Biography ==
Ioulia Makka twice in row won the Greek Junior Chess Championship in the U20 Girls Age Group (2002, 2003). In 2003, in Nakhchivan she won silver medal in World Girls U-20 Championship.

She won four bronze medals in Greek Women's Chess Championships (2001, 2004, 2005, 2017), but in 2018 she won Greek Women's Chess Championship.

Makka played for Greece twice in the European Team Chess Championships (2007, 2017).

In 2002, she awarded the FIDE Woman International Master (WIM) title. In 2016, she became an FIDE Trainer.
