= Haralambos Syngellakis =

Greek chess player

Personal information
- Born: 1935
- Died: 1986 (aged 50–51)

Chess career
- Country: Greece

Haralambos Syngellakis (Greek: Χαράλαμπος Συγγελάκης; 1935–1986) was a Greek chess player, Greek Chess Championship winner (1958).

== Biography ==
From the end of 1950s Haralambos Syngellakis was one of Greek leading chess players. In 1958 he won Greek Chess Championship.

Haralambos Syngellakis played for Greece in the Chess Olympiad:

- In 1958, at first board in the 13th Chess Olympiad in Munich (+0, =0, -3).

There is no information about the further chess activity of Haralambos Syngellakis.
