= Greek Chess Championship =

National chess championship in Greece

The Greek Chess Championship is the major individual National Championship in Greece. The record holding winners are Vasilios Kotronias at the Open/Men's Championship with 10 titles and Marina Makropoulou at the Women's Championship with 9 titles.

== Winners ==
#	Year	Open/Men's Winner
(1)	1934	Dimitrios Papantoniou
(2)	1935	Stavros Fryganas
(3)	1947	Marios Mikrouleas
(4)	1948	Christos Mylonas
1	1949	Fotis Mastihiadis
2	1950	Dimitrios Parliaros
3	1951	Georgios Gaitanaros
4	1952	Georgios Gaitanaros
5	1953	Georgios Gaitanaros
6	1954	Dimitrios Parliaros
7	1956	Triantafyllos Siaperas
8	1957	Panayotis Panagopoulos
9	1958	Haralambos Syngellakis
10	1959	Alexandros Angos
11	1960	Anastasios Anastasopoulos
12	1961	Anastasios Anastasopoulos
13	1962	Hristos Kokkoris
14	1963	Konstantinos Hadziotis
15	1964	Aristides Paidousis
16	1965	Lazaros Vizantiadis
17	1966	Lazaros Vizantiadis
18	1967	Anastasios Anastasopoulos
19	1969	Hristos Kokkoris
20	1970	Hristos Kokkoris
21	1971	Georgios Makropoulos
22	1972	Triantafyllos Siaperas
23	1973	Georgios Makropoulos
24	1974	Miltiadis Grigoriou
25	1975	Georgios Makropoulos
26	1976	Panayotis Balaskas
27	1977	Georgios Makropoulos
28	1978	Georgios Makropoulos
29	1979	Panayotis Balaskas
30	1980	Georgios Makropoulos
31	1981	Spyridon Skembris
32	1982	Nikolaos Skalkotas
33	1983	Efstratios Grivas
34	1984	Spyridon Skembris
35	1985	Georgios Makropoulos
36	1986	Vasilios Kotronias
37	1987	Vasilios Kotronias
38	1988	Vasilios Kotronias
39	1989	Spyridon Skembris
40	1990	Vasilios Kotronias
41	1991	Vasilios Kotronias
42	1992	Vasilios Kotronias
43	1993	Spyridon Skembris
44	1994	Vasilios Kotronias
45	1995	Ioannis Nikolaidis
46	1996	Efstratios Grivas
47	1997	Ioannis Papaioannou
48	1998	Ioannis Papaioannou
49	1999	Ioannis Papaioannou
50	2000	Hristos Banikas
51	2001	Hristos Banikas
52	2002	Hristos Banikas
53	2003	Hristos Banikas
54	2004	Hristos Banikas
55	2005	Hristos Banikas
56	2006	Vasilios Kotronias
57	2007	Ioannis Papadopoulos
58	2008	Hristos Banikas
59	2009	Hristos Banikas
60	2010	Vasilios Kotronias
61	2011	Antonios Pavlidis
62	2012	Antonios Pavlidis
63	2013	Sotirios Malikentzos
64	2014	Vasilios Kotronias
65	2015	Athanasios Mastrovasilis
66	2016	Antonios Pavlidis
67	2017	Ioannis Nikolaidis
68	2018	Athanasios Mastrovasilis
69	2019	Stamatis Kourkoulos-Arditis
--	2020	(not held due to COVID-19)
70	2021	Athanasios Mastrovasilis
71	2022	Georgios Mitsis
72	2023	Stamatis Kourkoulos-Arditis
73	2024	Stamatis Kourkoulos-Arditis
74	2025	Vangelis Patrelakis
75	2026	Evgenios Ioannidis

#	Year	Women's Winner
(1)	1947	Mousina Klio
1	1978	Artemis Fouriki
2	1979	Artemis Fouriki
3	1980	Artemis Fouriki
4	1981	Maria Petraki
5	1982	Katerina Nika
6	1983	Katerina Nika
7	1984	Eva Kondou
8	1985	Eva Kondou
9	1986	Efrosini Kasioura; Anna-Maria Botsari
10	1987	Eva Kondou
11	1988	Anna-Maria Botsari
12	1989	Maria Petraki
13	1990	Marina Makropoulou
14	1991	Aspasia Giaitzi
15	1992	Eva Kondou
16	1993	Maria Petraki
17	1994	Marina Makropoulou
18	1995	Ekaterini Fakhiridou
19	1996	Marina Makropoulou
20	1997	Anna-Maria Botsari
21	1998	Marina Makropoulou
22	1999	Marina Makropoulou
23	2000	Maria Kouvatsou
24	2001	Anna-Maria Botsari
25	2002	Anna-Maria Botsari
26	2003	Ekatrini Fakhiridou
27	2004	Marina Makropoulou
28	2005	Ekatrini Fakhiridou
29	2006	Anna-Maria Botsari
30	2007	Marina Makropoulou
31	2008	Anna-Maria Botsari
32	2009	Vera Papadopoulou
33	2010	Anna-Maria Botsari
34	2011	Marina Makropoulou
35	2012	Ekaterini Pavlidou
36	2013	Ekaterini Pavlidou
37	2014	Haritomeni Markantonaki
38	2015	Ekaterini Pavlidou
39	2016	Stavroula Tsolakidou
40	2017	Ekaterini Pavlidou
41	2018	Ioulia Makka
42	2019	Haritomeni Markantonaki
--	2020	(not held due to COVID-19)
43	2021	Haritomeni Markantonaki
44	2022	Marina Makropoulou
45	2023	Maria-Anna Stefanidi
46	2024	Georgia Grapsa
47	2025	Maria Tsakona
48	2026	Stavroula Tsolakidou

== Multiple Winners ==
(+4 titles)

Open/Men's Winners

10 - Vasilios Kotronias

8 - Hristos Banikas

7 - Georgios Makropoulos

4 - Spyridon Skembris

Women's Winners

9 - Marina Makropoulou

8 - Anna-Maria Botsari

4 - Eva Kondou, Ekaterini Pavlidou
