= Borki Predojević =

Bosnian chess grandmaster (born 1987)

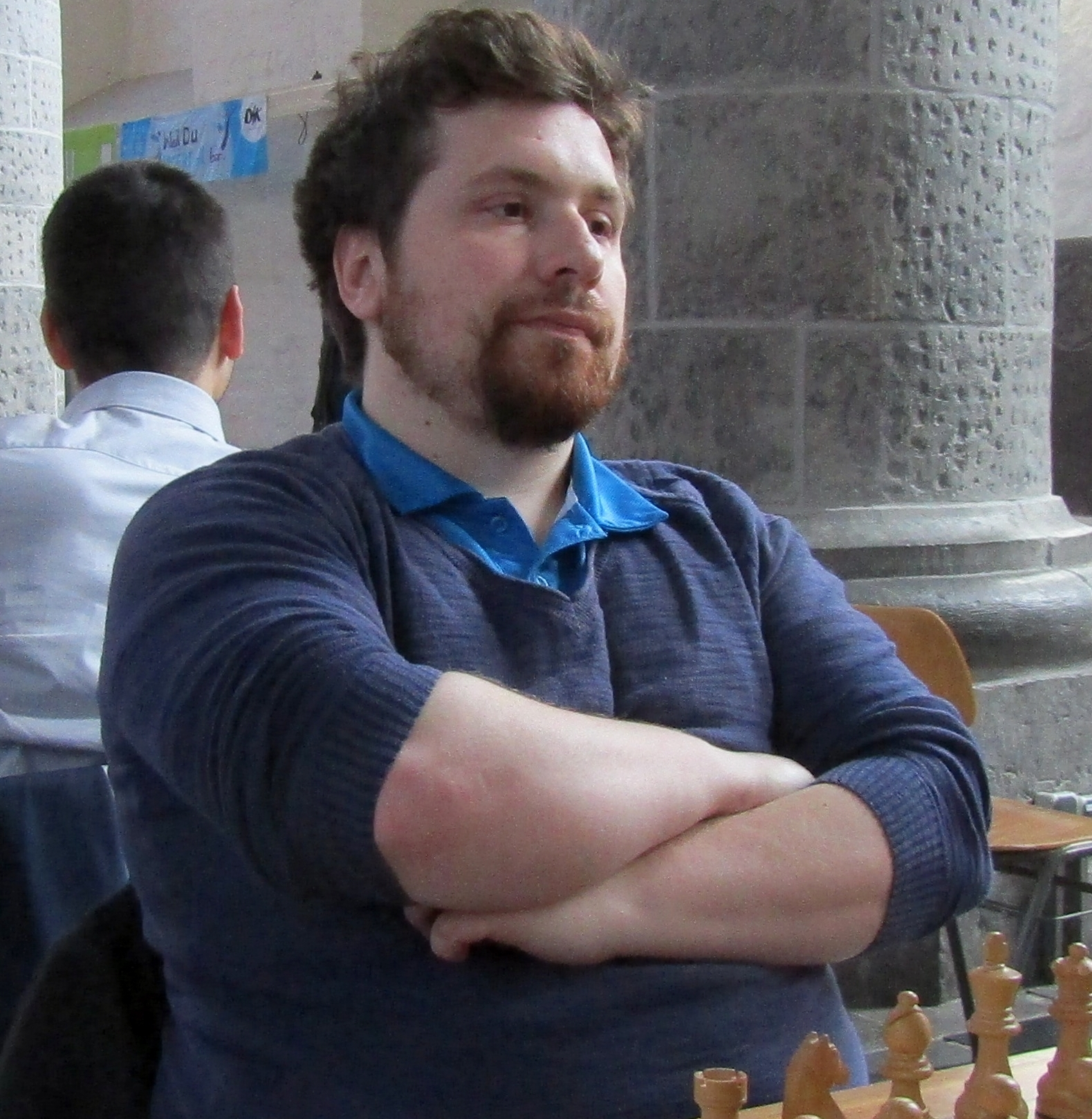
- Predojević in 2017

Personal information
- Born: 6 April 1987 (age 39) Teslić, SR Bosnia and Herzegovina, SFR Yugoslavia

Chess career
- Country: Yugoslavia (until 2003); Bosnia and Herzegovina (since 2003)
- Title: Grandmaster (2005)
- FIDE rating: 2546 (November 2026)
- Peak rating: 2655 (May 2016)
- Peak ranking: No. 68 (April 2008)

Borki Predojević (Serbian Cyrillic: Борки Предојевић; born 6 April 1987) is a Bosnian chess grandmaster, the youngest ever from his country. He is the No. 1 ranked player of Bosnia and Herzegovina as of September 2023.

== Early life ==
Borki Predojević was born on 6 April 1987 in Teslić, SR Bosnia and Herzegovina, SFR Yugoslavia (now Republika Srpska, Bosnia and Herzegovina) to father Borislav Predojević, who is also a chess player and administrator, and mother Živana, doctor. He has a sister named Božana.

Borki first started to play chess in the local club Teslić in 1995, and is one of the founders of chess club Mladost, also in Teslić, in 1998.

== Chess career ==
Predojević was European Champion U-12 in 1999 and U-14 in 2001 representing FR Yugoslavia (Serbia and Montenegro). He was also Cadet Champion of FR Yugoslavia in 1998, 1999 and 2001. In 2003 he transferred federations from FR Yugoslavia to Bosnia and Herzegovina, and won the World U-16 Championship. Predojević earned the Grandmaster title with his performance at the 2004 Olympiad where he made his third required norm. He won the 2009 Acropolis International chess tournament in Athens, and in the same year he shared second place with Wang Hao in the 39th Bosna International Tournament, a six-player double round-robin event in Sarajevo. In the 2011 edition, held with the Swiss system, he tied for 2nd-4th with Hrant Melkumyan and Mircea Pârligras. On 28 and 29 June 2013, he played a friendly four-game rapid match with world No. 1 player Magnus Carlsen in Lillehammer, losing by 1.5-2.5 after three draws and one loss.

Predojević was a member of the silver medal-winning team ŠK Bosna Sarajevo at the European Club Cup in 2004. In addition to his three Cadet Championships in FR Yugoslavia, he was also Cadet Champion of Republika Srpska 10 times between 1997–2004, Youth Champion of both Republika Srpska and Bosnia and Herzegovina in 2005 and Junior Champion of Bosnia and Herzegovina three times (2001, 2003, 2004). He represented Bosnia and Herzegovina in Chess Olympiads in 2004, 2006, 2008, 2010 and 2014. In the 2008 event he achieved a rating performance of 2745, the fourth best at board 2.

Predojević authored his first book on chess Moje stvaralaštvo (My creativity) in 2010, written in the Serbian language, and is a co-author of seven volumes of Chess Evolution (2011–2013) in English language.
