= Georgia Grapsa =

Greek chess player

Personal information
- Born: 25 August 1984 (age 41)

Chess career
- Country: Greece
- Title: Woman FIDE Master (2013)
- Peak rating: 2128 (February 2018)

Georgia Grapsa (Greek: Γεωργία Γράψα; born 25 August 1984) is a Greek chess player who holds the FIDE title of Woman FIDE Master (WFM, 2013). She is a Greek Women's Chess Championship winner (2024).

== Biography ==
Georgia Grapsa is a multiple participant in the Greek Women's Chess Championships. Her best results were in 2014, when she finished 3rd, and in 2024, when she won the Greek Women's Chess Championship.

As a member of various Thessaloniki chess clubs, she has regularly participated in the Greek Team Chess Championships, where she has won 2 silver (2001, 2003) and 2 bronze (1999, 2000) medals in the team standings.

Georgia Grapsa participated in the European Women's Individual Chess Championships in 2008 in Plovdiv and in 2017 in Riga.

In 2013, she awarded the Woman FIDE Master (WFM) title. In 2018, she became an International Arbiter.
