= Alexandros Angos =

Greek chess player

Personal information
- Born: 17 August 1933
- Died: 18 December 2007 (aged 74)

Chess career
- Country: Greece; United States

Alexandros Angos (Greek: Αλέξανδρος Άγγος; 17 August 1933 – 18 December 2007) was a Greek and American chess player, Greek Chess Championship winner (1959).

== Biography ==
From the mid-1950s to the begin of 1960s Alexandros Angos was one of Greek leading chess players. In 1959 he won Greek Chess Championship.

Alexandros Angos played for Greece in the Chess Olympiads:

- In 1956, at second board in the 12th Chess Olympiad in Moscow (+4, =5, -6),
- In 1958, at second board in the 13th Chess Olympiad in Munich (+6, =4, -8),
- In 1960, at second board in the 14th Chess Olympiad in Leipzig (+5, =11, -4).

Later Alexandros Angos emigrated to the USA. He lived in Milwaukee for many years.

In 1982, Thinkers' Press published his book about heavy-figure chess endings called "Endgame Artillery".
