= Siniša Dražić =

Serbian chess grandmaster (born 1967)

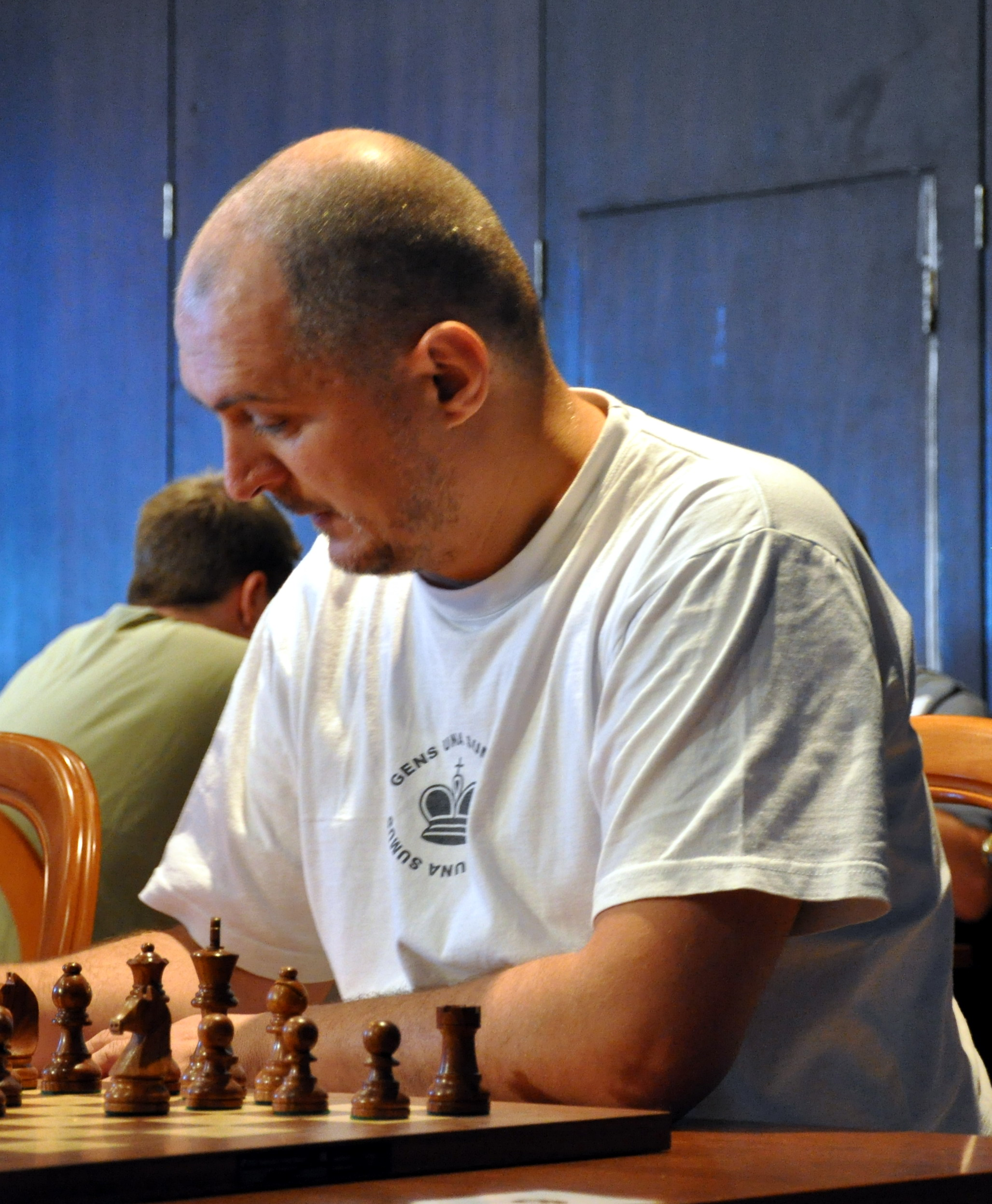
- Siniša Dražić in Pula, 2011

Personal information
- Born: December 16, 1967 (age 58) Žabalj, Yugoslavia

Chess career
- Country: Yugoslavia (until 2006); Serbia (since 2006)
- Title: Grandmaster (2000)
- Peak rating: 2546 (September 2010)

Siniša Dražić (born 16 December 1967) is a Serbian chess Grandmaster.

== Career ==
Dražić achieved one of his early international successes in 1990, tying for second place behind Sergey Yanovsky in the C tournament at the Dortmund Sparkassen Chess Meeting. In 1994, he represented Yugoslavia at the World University Chess Championship in Sofia, tying for 6th–8th place.

FIDE awarded him the Grandmaster title in 2000.

In 2009, Dražić tied for 2nd–3rd place alongside Miloš Perunović behind Ivan Ivanišević at the Serbian Chess Championship.

=== Tournament results ===
Throughout his career, Dražić has won or shared first place in numerous open and round-robin tournaments:

- 1998: Clichy; Wijk aan Zee (Sonnevanck tournament)
- 2000: Cesenatico (tied with Iván Faragó and Vencislav Inkiov)
- 2001: Novi Sad; Milan (tied with Andrij Maksymenko); Bratto (tied with Vladimir Epishin, Vadim Milov, Igor Khenkin, Michele Godena, and Giulio Borgo)
- 2002: Bačka Palanka (tied with Dušan Rajković, Vasile Sănduleac, and Dmitry Svetushkin)
- 2004: Milan; Bassano del Grappa
- 2005: Falconara Marittima; Novi Sad; Cortina d'Ampezzo (tied with Michele Godena); Padua (tied with Erald Dervishi and Miroljub Lazić)
- 2006: Đakovo (tied with Ante Brkić)
- 2007: El Sauzal (rapid, tied with Mikheil Mchedlishvili); Senigallia (tied with Igor Efimov and Todor Todorov); Milan (tied with Rolly Martinez); Monti (tied with Volodymyr Baklan); Novi Sad (tied with Dragan Kosić); Vrnjačka Banja (tied with Dejan Pikula)
- 2008: Split; Zadar (Croatian Open Championship); Olbia (tied with Viesturs Meijers); Zrenjanin (tied with Mihailo Zlatić)
- 2009: Vukovar

He reached his peak FIDE rating of 2546 in September 2010, when he was ranked 15th among Serbian chess players.
