= Ioannis Nikolaidis =

Greek chess grandmaster (born 1971)

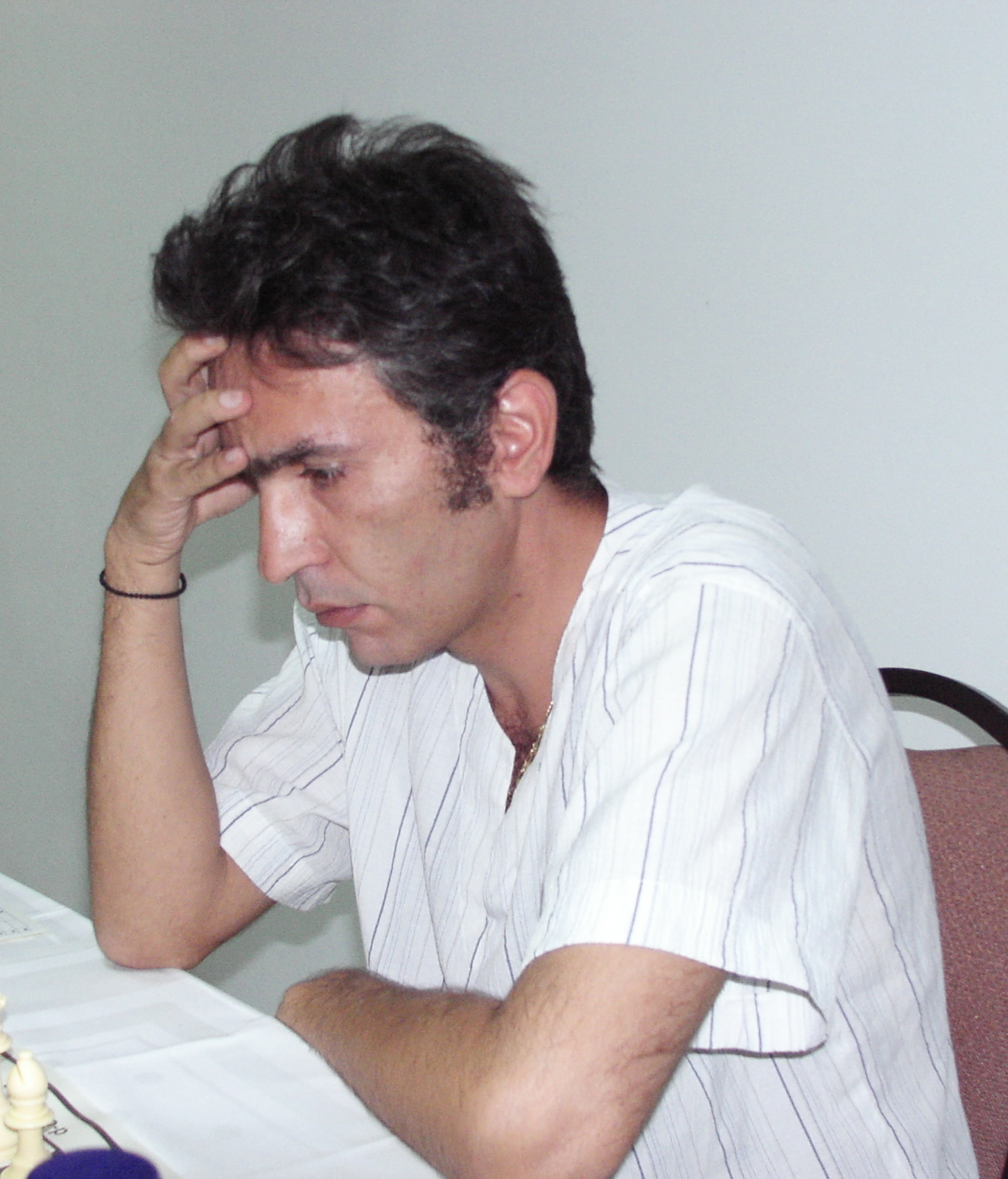

Personal information
- Born: Ιωάννης Νικολαΐδης; 4 January 1971 (age 55)

Chess career
- Country: Greece
- Title: Grandmaster (1995)
- FIDE rating: 2449 (July 2026)
- Peak rating: 2585 (July 1996)
- Peak ranking: No. 83 (July 1996)

Ioannis Nikolaidis (Greek: Ιωάννης Νικολαΐδης, born 4 January 1971) is a Greek chess grandmaster (1995).

He won the Greek Chess Championship in 1995. and came third in the Balkan Individual Chess Championship of 2002 in Istanbul. Nikolaidis played for Greece in the Chess Olympiads of 1994, 1996, 1998, 2000, 2002, 2004 and 2006. Two times he played in chess balkaniads: 1993 and 1994.

Other results include: 7th–11th with Zurab Sturua, Giorgi Bagaturov, Angelos Vouldis and Ashot Nadanian in the Zonal tournament in Panormo, Crete 1998, which was the qualifying tournament for the FIDE World Chess Championship 1999; third in the Bolzano open 2000; first in the 16th international tournament in Nikea 2008. In 2005, he tied for second–third places with Maxim Turov in the Ikaros Chess Festival.

In the May 2010 FIDE list, he has an Elo rating of 2490.
