= Nikolaos Skalkotas =

Greek chess player (1949–2020)

Personal information
- Born: 21 September 1949
- Died: 2 September 2020 (aged 70)

Chess career
- Country: Greece
- Title: International Master (1984)
- Peak rating: 2375 (July 1983)

Nikolaos Skalkotas (Greek: Νικόλαος Σκαλκώτας; 21 September 1949 – 2 September 2020) was a Greek chess International Master (IM) (1984), Greek Chess Championship winner (1982).

== Chess player career ==
From the early 1970s to the early 1990s, Nikolaos Skalkotas was one of Greece's leading chess players. In 1982 he won the Greek Chess Championship and Acropolis International chess tournament in Athens.

Nikolaos Skalkotas played for Greece in the Chess Olympiad:

- In 1970, at first reserve board in the 19th Chess Olympiad in Siegen (+4, =8, -2),
- In 1972, at third board in the 20th Chess Olympiad in Skopje (+3, =4, -7),
- In 1974, at second board in the 21st Chess Olympiad in Nice (+5, =6, -7),
- In 1980, at third board in the 24th Chess Olympiad in La Valletta (+3, =3, -4),
- In 1982, at second board in the 25th Chess Olympiad in Lucerne (+4, =2, -4),
- In 1984, at first reserve board in the 26th Chess Olympiad in Thessaloniki (+4, =2, -3),
- In 1986, at first reserve board in the 27th Chess Olympiad in Dubai (+1, =0, -1),
- In 1988, at second reserve board in the 28th Chess Olympiad in Thessaloniki (+0, =3, -0),
- In 1990, at second reserve board in the 29th Chess Olympiad in Novi Sad (+0, =1, -1),

Nikolaos Skalkotas played for Greece in the European Team Chess Championships:

- In 1989, at fifth board in the 9th European Team Chess Championship in Haifa (+1, =0, -2).

Nikolaos Skalkotas played for Greece in the World Student Team Chess Championships:

- In 1968, at second board in the 15th World Student Team Chess Championship in Ybbs (+2, =8, -2),
- In 1969, at second board in the 16th World Student Team Chess Championship in Dresden (+1, =5, -6),
- In 1972, at first board in the 19th World Student Team Chess Championship in Graz (+5, =3, -4),

Nikolaos Skalkotas played for Greece in the Men's Chess Balkaniads:

- In 1971, at fourth board in the 3rd Men's Chess Balkaniad in Athens (+1, =3, -0) and won individual silver medal,
- In 1972, at third board in the 4th Men's Chess Balkaniad in Sofia (+1, =1, -2),
- In 1973, at third board in the 5th Men's Chess Balkaniad in Poiana Brașov (+0, =3, -1),
- In 1978, at first reserve board in the 10th Men's Chess Balkaniad in Băile Herculane (+1, =1, -2),
- In 1979, at second board in the 11th Chess Balkaniad in Bihać (+0, =1, -4),
- In 1981, at sixth board in the 13th Chess Balkaniad in Athens (+1, =1, -2),
- In 1982, at second board in the 14th Chess Balkaniad in Plovdiv (+0, =2, -3),
- In 1983, at third board in the 15th Chess Balkaniad in Băile Herculane (+0, =0, -3),
- In 1985, at fifth board in the 17th Chess Balkaniad in Irakleio (+0, =1, -1),
- In 1986, at fifth board in the 18th Chess Balkaniad in Sofia (+0, =1, -4),
- In 1988, at sixth board in the 19th Chess Balkaniad in Kaštel Stari (+0, =1, -1),
- In 1990, at sixth board in the 21st Chess Balkaniad in Kavala (+1, =3, -2).

In 1984, Nikolaos Skalkotas was awarded the FIDE International Master (IM) title.
