= Aurel Urzică =

Romanian chess player

Personal information
- Born: 11 November 1952 (age 73)

Chess career
- Country: Romania
- Title: International Master (1980)
- FIDE rating: 2402 (July 2026)
- Peak rating: 2434 (January 1999)

Aurel Urzică (born 11 November 1952) is a Romanian chess player, International Master (IM) (1980), Romanian Chess Championship winner (1974).

== Biography ==
In 1969, Aurel Urzică won a bronze medal in Stockholm at the World Junior Chess Championship. He achieved his next success at the turn of 1972 and 1973 in Groningen, where he won a bronze medal in the European Junior Chess Championship. In 1974 he won Romanian Chess Championship. In 1977, Aurel Urzică represented Romania at the European Team Chess Championship in Moscow, where the Romanian chess players took fourth place. In 1979, he won the international tournament Acropolis International chess tournament in Athens. In 1995, Aurel Urzică achieved another success, winning the bronze medal in the Romanian Chess Championship.

Aurel Urzică achieved the highest rating in his career on January 1, 1999, with a score of 2434 points, he was then 25th among Romanian chess players. Since 2003, he has not participated in tournaments classified by the International Chess Federation (FIDE).
