= Stamatis Kourkoulos-Arditis =

Greek chess grandmaster (born 1998)

Personal information
- Born: 7 June 1998 (age 28)

Chess career
- Country: Greece
- Title: Grandmaster (2023)
- FIDE rating: 2530 (November 2026)
- Peak rating: 2592 (December 2025)

Stamatis Kourkoulos-Arditis (Greek: Σταμάτης Κούρκουλος-Αρδίτης, born 7 June 1998) is a Greek chess grandmaster. He is the 3rd ranked best player in Greece and his highest rating is 2592 (in December 2025). He grew up in Kallithea.

He won the 2019, 2023, and 2024 Greek Championship.

In 2020, he won the 13th Paleochora Open with a score of 7.5/9

He beat GM Maxime Lagarde in round 9 of the 2019 European Championship, achieving the final score of 6/11.

Kourkoulos-Arditis became a FIDE Master in 2014, an International Master (IM) in 2018, and a grandmaster (GM) in 2023.
