= Aristides Paidousis =

Greek chess player (1925–2002)

Personal information
- Born: 22 October 1925
- Died: 2002 (aged 76–77)

Chess career
- Country: Greece

Aristides Paidousis (Greek: Αριστείδης Παιδούσης; 22 October 1925 – 2002) was a Greek chess player, Greek Chess Championship winner (1964).

== Biography ==
From the 1960s to the 1970s Aristides Paidousis was one of Greek leading chess players. He won Greek Chess Championship in 1964.

Aristides Paidousis played for Greece in the Chess Olympiads:

- In 1960, at fourth board in the 14th Chess Olympiad in Leipzig (+0, =13, -7),
- In 1962, at first reserve board in the 15th Chess Olympiad in Varna (+0, =4, -7),
- In 1964, at first board in the 16th Chess Olympiad in Tel Aviv (+3, =7, -6).

Aristides Paidousis played for Greece in the European Team Chess Championship preliminaries:

- In 1973, at seventh board in the 5th European Team Chess Championship preliminaries (+1, =0, -2),
- In 1977, at eighth board in the 6th European Team Chess Championship preliminaries (+0, =1, -3).

Aristides Paidousis played for Greece in the Men's Chess Balkaniads:

- In 1975, at fifth board in the 7th Men's Chess Balkaniad in Istanbul (+0, =1, -3),
- In 1976, at fourth board in the 8th Men's Chess Balkaniad in Athens (+0, =1, -3),
- In 1977, at fifth board in the 9th Men's Chess Balkaniad in Albena (+0, =1, -2).
