= Dimitrios Parliaros =

Greek chess player

Personal information
- Born: 1920
- Died: unknown

Chess career
- Country: Greece

Dimitrios Parliaros (Greek: Δημήτριος Παρλιάρος; 1920 – unknown) was a Greek chess player. He won the Greek Chess Championship two times (1950, 1954).

== Biography ==
In the 1950s Dimitrios Parliaros was a leading Greek chess player. He won the Greek Chess Championships two-times: 1950 and 1954.

Dimitrios Parliaros played for Greece in the Chess Olympiad:

- In 1954, at first board in the 11th Chess Olympiad in Amsterdam (+0, =6, -12).
