= Hristos Banikas =

Greek chess grandmaster (born 1978)

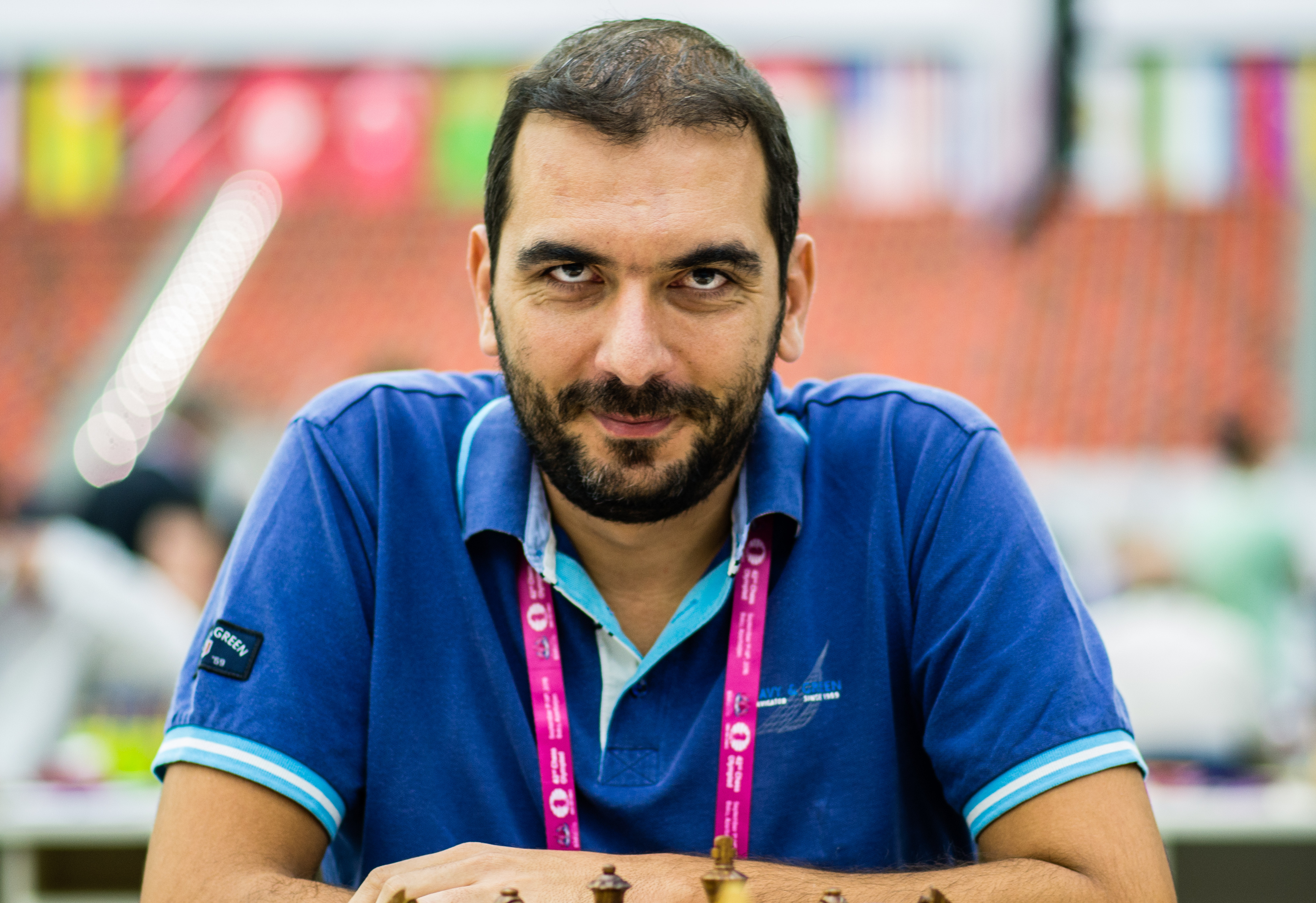
- Banikas in 2016

Personal information
- Born: Hristodoulos Banikas; 20 May 1978 (age 48) Salonica, Greece

Chess career
- Country: Greece
- Title: Grandmaster (2001)
- FIDE rating: 2545 (July 2026)
- Peak rating: 2646 (July 2014)

Hristodoulos Banikas (Greek: Χριστόδουλος Μπανίκας; born 20 May 1978) is a Greek chess grandmaster from Thessaloniki.

== Chess career ==
Banikas won the 1990 Greek U-12 championship, the 1993 Greek U-16 championship, and the 1996 Greek U-20 championship. He won eight Greek championships from 2000 through 2005 and from 2008 to 2009. Banikas has received the Grandmaster title from FIDE in 2001.

In 2001 he lost a Man vs. Machine match against Deep Junior. In 2002 Banikas won the European Rapid Chess Championship in Panormo, Crete edging Sergei Movsesian on tiebreak score, and the 2nd Balkan Individual Championship in Istanbul.

Banikas played for the Greek national team in every Chess Olympiad since 1996, except 2004, in the 2010 World Team Chess Championship winning an individual silver medal, and in every European Team Chess Championship since 2001 winning an individual silver in 2005.

== Playing style ==
Banikas is well known for entering into tactical complications. With the black pieces he usually plays the Sicilian Defence against 1.e4. With the white pieces he prefers 1.d4, but occasionally plays 1. Nf3 or 1.c4.
