= Vasiliki Pavlidou =

Greek astrophysicist

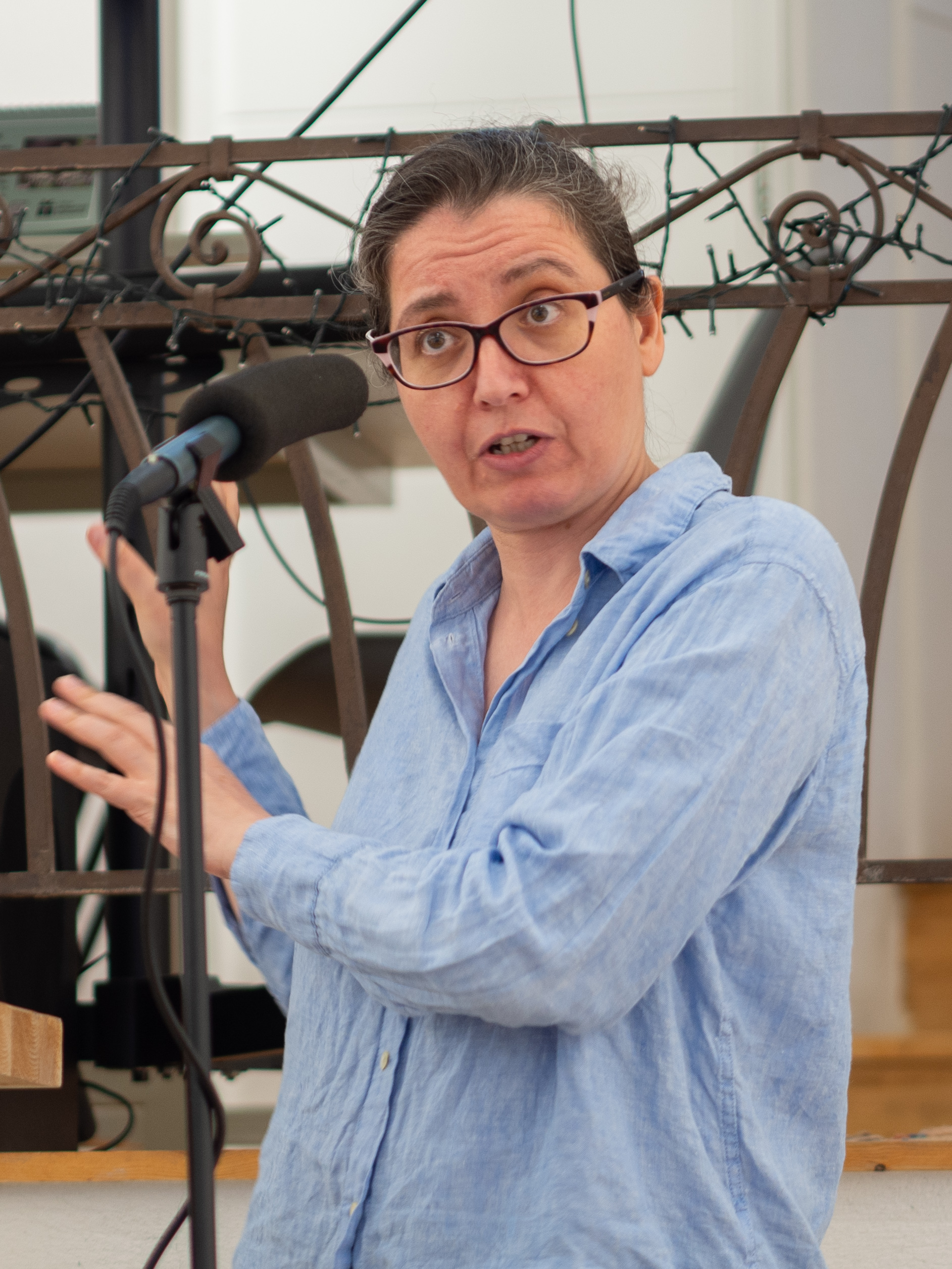
- Education: Aristotle University of Thessaloniki; University of Illinois at Urbana Champaign
- Scientific career
- Workplaces: University of Chicago; University of Crete; Caltech
- Thesis: An Analytic Model of Environmental Effects on Cosmic Structure Formation and an Application to Cosmic Accretion Shock. (2005)

Vasiliki Pavlidou is a Greek astrophysicst and Full Professor in the Department of Physics at the University of Crete and an Affiliated Faculty and acting director at the Institute of Astrophysics - Foundation for Research & Technology - Helas. Since July 2023 she serves as an associate editor in the peer-reviewed scientific journal Astronomy & Astrophysics Her research interests focus on cosmology, high energy physics and radio astronomy.

== Education ==
Pavlidou received her BSc from the Aristotle University of Thessaloniki in 1999. She continued her studies at the University of Illinois at Urbana Champaign, where she completed her doctoral thesis on astrophysics, and received her doctoral title in 2005.

== Research ==
From 2005 to 2008, Pavlidou held a postdoctoral position at the Institute of Cosmology at the University of Chicago. From 2008 to 2011 she was awarded the Einstein scholarship at Caltech. In 2010 she was elected as an assistant professor at the University of Crete, but that appointment was delayed due to the financial crisis in Greece. In 2011-2012 she was visiting researcher at the Max-Planck Institute for Radioastronomy and in 2012 she accepted a temporary research position at the University of Crete. Her delayed appointment as an assistant professor at the University of Crete finally begun in 2013, and she was successively promoted to associate professor in 2018 and Full Professor in 2023.

Pavlidou has been the chair of the management panel of the RoboPol collaboration since 2012.

== Science communication ==
Pavlidou has promoted science communication by giving talks and presentations to the general public. She has been in the organizing committee of workshops targeting a specialist audience. Vasiliki Pavlidou together with Konstantinos Tassis have developed two introductory astronomy MOOCs for the general public at the mathesis platform.

== Awards ==
- 1999 Theoretical Physics Fellowship Greek State Scholarships Foundation
- 2002 Amelia Earhart Fellowship Zonta Foundation
- 2008 GLAST (Einstein) Fellowship NASA
- 2014 Award for Women in Science (Greece) L'Oreal-UNESCO
- 2024 ERC Synergy

== Selected publications ==
- Pierre Auger Collaboration; J Abraham; P Abreu; et al. (1 November 2007). "Correlation of the highest-energy cosmic rays with nearby extragalactic objects". Science. 318 (5852): 938–943. arXiv:0711.2256. Bibcode:2007Sci...318..938P. doi:10.1126/science.1151124. ISSN 0036-8075. PMID 17991855. Wikidata Q34712024.
- J Abraham; P Abreu; Marco Aglietta; et al. (4 August 2008). "Observation of the suppression of the flux of cosmic rays above 4 x 10 (19) eV". Physical Review Letters. 101 (6) 061101. arXiv:0806.4302. doi:10.1103/physrevlett.101.061101. ISSN 0031-9007. PMID 18764444. Wikidata Q27350475.
- J. Abraham; M. Aglietta; I.C. Aguirre; et al. (May 2004). "Properties and performance of the prototype instrument for the Pierre Auger Observatory". Nuclear Instruments and Methods in Physics Research. 523 (1–2): 50–95. Bibcode:2004NIMPA.523...50A. doi:10.1016/j.nima.2003.12.012. ISSN 0168-9002. Wikidata Q57533100.
