= Hristos Kokkoris =

Greek chess player (born 1942)

Personal information
- Born: 1942 (age 83–84)

Chess career
- Country: Greece
- Title: FIDE Master (1983)
- Peak rating: 2320 (July 1971)

Hristos Kokkoris (Greek: Χρίστος Κοκκόρης; born 1942) is a Greek chess FIDE Master (FM) and three-time Greek Chess Championship winner (1962, 1969, 1970).

== Biography ==
From the 1960s to the 1970s, Hristos Kokkoris was one of leading Greek chess players. He won the Greek Chess Championship three times: in 1962, 1969, and 1970. In 1969, in Athens, Hristos Kokkoris participated in the World Chess Championship European Zonal Tournament, where he shared 13th–15th place.

Hristos Kokkoris played for Greece in the Chess Olympiads:

- In 1962, at the first board in the 15th Chess Olympiad in Varna (+4, =3, -10),
- In 1964, at the second board in the 16th Chess Olympiad in Tel Aviv (+6, =1, -8),
- In 1968, at the first reserve board in the 18th Chess Olympiad in Lugano (+7, =4, -5).

Hristos Kokkoris played for Greece in the European Team Chess Championship preliminaries:

- In 1970, at the second board in the 4th European Team Chess Championship preliminaries (+0, =1, -3).
