= Antonios Pavlidis =

Greek chess grandmaster (born 1993)

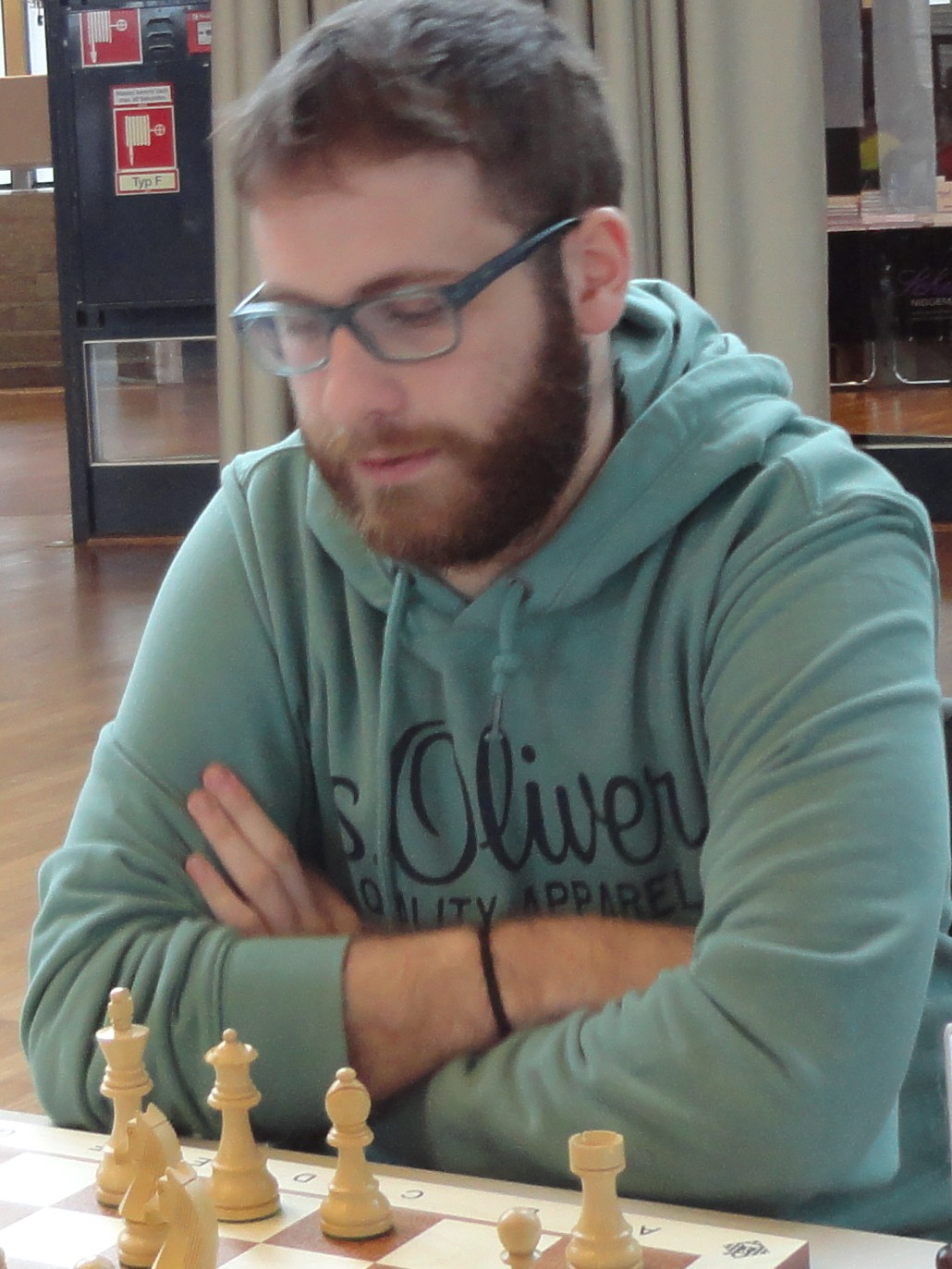
- Antonios Pavlidis in 2016

Personal information
- Born: 1 April 1993 (age 33)

Chess career
- Country: Greece
- Title: Grandmaster (2014)
- FIDE rating: 2573 (July 2026)
- Peak rating: 2584 (April 2024)

Antonios Pavlidis (Greek: Αντώνιος Παυλίδης; born 1 April 1993) is a Greek chess Grandmaster (2014), three-time Greek Chess Championship winner (2011, 2012, 2016).

== Chess career ==
In the 2010s Antonios Pavlidis was one of the top Greek chess players. He competed many times in the individual finals of the Greek Chess Championship, winning the title of national champion three times (in 2011, 2012, and 2016).

In 2014 he won International Chess tournament 28th Belgrade Trophy in Belgrade.

Antonios Pavlidis played for Greece in the Chess Olympiad:

- In 2018, at reserve board in the 43rd Chess Olympiad in Batumi (+2, =4, -2).

Antonios Pavlidis played for Greece in the European Team Chess Championships:

- In 2017, at fourth board in the 21st European Team Chess Championship in Hersonissos (+2, =3, -2),
- In 2021, at third board in the 23rd European Team Chess Championship in Čatež ob Savi (+2, =3, -2).

In 2010, Antonios Pavlidis was awarded the FIDE International Master (IM) title and received the FIDE Grandmaster (GM) title four years later.
