= Neotectonics =

Neotectonics, a subdiscipline of tectonics, is the study of the motions and deformations of Earth's crust (geological and geomorphological processes) that are current or recent in geologic time. The term may also refer to the motions/deformations in question themselves. Geologists refer to the corresponding time-frame as the neotectonic period, and to the preceding time as the palaeotectonic period.

Vladimir Obruchev coined the term neotectonics in his 1948 article, defining the field as "recent tectonic movements occurred in the upper part of Tertiary (Neogene) and in the Quaternary, which played an essential role in the origin of the contemporary topography". Since then geologists have disagreed as to how far back to date "geologically recent" time, with the common meaning being that neotectonics is the youngest, not yet finished stage in Earth tectonics. Some authors consider neotectonics to be basically synonymous with "active tectonics", while others date the start of the neotectonic period from the middle Miocene. A general agreement has started to emerge that the actual time-frame may be individual for each geological environment and it must be set back in time sufficiently far to fully understand the current tectonic activity.

In 1989 Spyros B. Pavlides suggested the definition:

"Neotectonics is the study of young tectonic events which have occurred or are still occurring in a given region after its orogeny or after its last significant tectonic set-up [...] The tectonic events are recent enough to permit a detailed analysis by differentiated and specific methods, while their results are directly compatible with seismological observations."

Many researchers have accepted this approach.

The Center for Neotectonic Studies at the University of Nevada, Reno defines neotectonics as

“the study of geologically recent motions of the Earth's crust, particularly those produced by earthquakes, with the goals of understanding the physics of earthquake recurrence, the growth of mountains, and the seismic hazard embodied in these processes.”

One source of different interpretations for a region stems from the fact that changes in different tectonic plates of the region may occur at different times, giving rise to the notion of the "transitional time", during which both palaeotectonic and neotectonic features coexist. For example, for central/northern Europe, the transitional period stretches from the middle early Miocene to the Miocene-Pliocene boundary.

== See also ==
- Seismic hazard
