= Mediterranean Chess Championship =

Chess tournament

Mediterranean Chess Championship is a Swiss tournament organized by the Mediterranean Chess Association member nations (MCA) and opened for the chess players who are the members of the association. MCA was established at the 73rd FIDE Congress in Bled, Slovenia and registered with FIDE as an affiliated international chess organization.

The winner of the tournament are declared the Champion of the Mediterranean Championship 2023, while the best placed female are declared Mediterranean Women Champion 2023.

== History ==
The 11th Mediterranean Chess Championship was held in 2021 in Petrovac, Montenegro, sharing the venue and the prize fund with European School Chess Individual Cup. The time controls were set at 90 minutes per player for 40 moves, plus 15 minutes until the end of the game, with increment of 40 seconds for each move, starting from move one. The event's total prize fund 10,500 Euros, including the Champion prize of 1,200 Euros.

In 2023, MCA partnered with the Catalan and Spanish Chess Federations, organizing the 13th Mediterranean Chess Championships 2023. The tournament was held in hotel La Terrassa in Platja d'Aro, Catalonia, from November 3 to November 11, 2023. It was played using time control of 90 minutes per player with a bonus of 30 seconds for each move played, starting from move one.

== Mediterranean Chess Champions ==
#	Year	City	Men's Champion	Women's Champion
1	2003	Beirut	Spyrios Kapnisis (Greece)	Silvia Collas (France)
2	2004	Antalya	Mert Erdoğdu (Turkey)	Vesna Rožič (Slovenia)
3	2005*	Kemer	Suat Atalık (Turkey)	Ekaterina Atalık (Turkey)
4	2006*	Cannes	Suat Atalık (Turkey)	Yelena Dembo (Greece)
5	2007	Sousse	Darko Dorić (Croatia)	Ljilja Drljevic (Montenegro)
6	2008*	Antalya	Ioannis Georgiadis (Greece)	Jovana Vojinovic (Montenegro)
7	2009	Rijeka	Ahmed Adly (Egypt)	Anna-Maria Botsari (Greece)
8	2012*	Beirut	Jwan Bakr (Syria)	Ekaterini Pavlidou (Greece)
9	2014	Chania	Bassem Amin (Egypt)	Mona Khaled (Egypt)
10	2015	Beirut	Ahmed Adly (Egypt)	Sophie Milliet (France)
11	2021	Petrovac	Ivan Saric (Croatia)	Stavroula Tsolakidou (Greece)
12	2022	Cairo	Dimitris Alexakis (Greece)	Haritomeni Markantonaki (Greece)
13	2023	Platja d'Aro	Gines Esteo Pedro Antonio (Spain)	Makka Evanthia (Greece)

*Note: Organized in the beginning of the following year.
