= Panayotis Panagopoulos =

Greek chess player

Personal information
- Born: 15 August 1916
- Died: 1999

Chess career
- Country: Greece

Panayotis Panagopoulos (Greek: Παναγιώτης Παναγόπουλος; 15 August 1916 – 1999) was a Greek chess player, Greek Chess Championship winner (1957).

== Biography ==
In the 1950s Panayotis Panagopoulos was one of Greek leading chess players. In 1957, he won Greek Chess Championship.

Panayotis Panagopoulos played for Greece in the Chess Olympiads:

- In 1950, at second board in the 9th Chess Olympiad in Dubrovnik (+0, =2, -10),
- In 1954, at third board in the 11th Chess Olympiad in Amsterdam (+5, =7, -6),
- In 1958, at third board in the 13th Chess Olympiad in Munich (+4, =5, -7).
