= Anastasios Anastasopoulos =

Greek chess player (1915–1981)

Personal information
- Born: 1915
- Died: 1981 (aged 65–66)

Chess career
- Country: Greece

Anastasios Anastasopoulos (Greek: Αναστάσιος Αναστασόπουλος; 1915 – 1981) was a Greek chess player, three-times Greek Chess Championship winner (1960, 1961, 1967).

== Biography ==
From the mid-1950s to the mid-1970s Anastasios Anastasopoulos was one of Greek leading chess players. He three times won Greek Chess Championship: in 1960, 1961, and 1967.

Anastasios Anastasopoulos played for Greece in the Chess Olympiads:

- In 1956, at fourth board in the 12th Chess Olympiad in Moscow (+4, =2, -8),
- In 1958, at first reserve board in the 13th Chess Olympiad in Munich (+6, =2, -6),
- In 1960, at first board in the 14th Chess Olympiad in Leipzig (+2, =7, -11),
- In 1962, at second board in the 15th Chess Olympiad in Varna (+7, =1, -10),
- In 1966, at third board in the 17th Chess Olympiad in Havana (+6, =4, -6).

Anastasios Anastasopoulos played for Greece in the European Team Chess Championship preliminaries:

- In 1970, at fourth board in the 4th European Team Chess Championship preliminaries (+0, =1, -4),
- In 1977, at eighth board in the 6th European Team Chess Championship preliminaries (+0, =0, -6).

Anastasios Anastasopoulos played for Greece in the Men's Chess Balkaniads:

- In 1975, at fourth board in the 7th Men's Chess Balkaniad in Istanbul (+0, =0, -4),
- In 1976, at first reserve board in the 8th Men's Chess Balkaniad in Athens (+0, =1, -2).
