= Acropolis International chess tournament =

Event in Athens, Greece (1968–2009)

The Acropolis International was a chess tournament held in Athens. The longest running international chess tournament in Greece, the first event, an international invitation tournament was won by Luděk Pachman in 1968.

The next event was not held until 1977, but subsequently it has been organized on a fairly regular basis by the Greek Chess Federation, including sometimes another minor event for men and a tournament for women, too.

The 2007 tournament was part of the Association of Chess Professionals Tour (ACP Tour). The 2009 open tournament took place in Chalkida on the island of Euboea and was won by Borki Predojević on tie-break. It turned out to be the last one.

The inaugural Acropolis was played as a round robin (all-play-all), then the format varied across the series, switching several times between closed and open tournaments played in Swiss system, totaling 24 editions.

Note: In the following list of the winners at Acropolis ICT, only the best player on tie-break is indicated if there were shared first places.

== Winners ==
Acropolis International in Athens
#	Year	Winner
1	1968	Luděk Pachman (Czechoslovakia)
2	1977	Valentin Stoica (Romania)
3	1978	Bela Soos (West Germany)
4	1979	Aurel Urzică (Romania)
5	1980	Dusan Raikovic (Yugoslavia)
6	1982	Nikolaos Skalkotas (Greece)
7	1983	Nikola Padevsky (Bulgaria)
8	1984	Sasa Velickovic (Yugoslavia)
9	1985	Valentin Stoica (Romania)
10	1986	Efstratios Grivas (Greece)
11	1987	Evgeni Vasiukov (Soviet Union)
12	1988	Vasilios Kotronias (Greece)
13	1989	Petar Velikov (Bulgaria)
14	1991	Efstratios Grivas (Greece)
15	1992	Rainer Knaak (Germany)
16	1993	Hannes Stefánsson (Iceland)
17	1997	Tamaz Gelashvili (Georgia)
18	2003	Vassilios Kotronias (Cyprus)
19	2004	Athanasios Mastrovasilis (Greece)
20	2005	Vugar Gashimov (Azerbaijan)
21	2006	Tamaz Gelashvili (Georgia)
22	2007	Ilya Smirin (Israel)
23	2008	Ilya Smirin (Israel)
24	2009	Borki Predojević (Bosnia and Herzegovina)
