= Panayotis Balaskas =

Greek chess player

Personal information
- Born: 19 October 1946 (age 79)

Chess career
- Country: Greece
- Peak rating: 2164 (April 2003)

Panayotis Balaskas (Greek: Παναγιώτης Μπαλάσκας; born 19 October 1946) is a Greek chess player, two-times Greek Chess Championship winner (1976, 1979).

== Biography ==
From the end of 1960s to the end of 1970s Panayotis Balaskas was one of Greek leading chess players. He twice won Greek Chess Championship: in 1976, and 1979. In 1975, in Caorle Panayotis Balaskas participated in World Chess Championship Mediterranean-African Zonal Tournament where ranked in 9th place.

Panayotis Balaskas played for Greece in the Chess Olympiad:

- In 1972, at second reserve board in the 20th Chess Olympiad in Skopje (+3, =1, -5).

Panayotis Balaskas played for Greece in the World Student Team Chess Championships:

- In 1968, at second reserve board in the 15th World Student Team Chess Championship in Ybbs (+0, =0, -3),
- In 1969, at first reserve board in the 16th World Student Team Chess Championship in Dresden (+4, =1, -5).

Panayotis Balaskas played for Greece in the Men's Chess Balkaniads:

- In 1972, at sixth board in the 4th Men's Chess Balkaniad in Sofia (+1, =0, -2),
- In 1975, at third board in the 7th Men's Chess Balkaniad in Istanbul (+1, =1, -2),
- In 1976, at fifth board in the 8th Men's Chess Balkaniad in Athens (+0, =0, -4),
- In 1977, at first board in the 9th Men's Chess Balkaniad in Albena (+0, =2, -2).
