= Igor Yefimov =

Igor Yefimov may refer to:

- Igor Yefimov (philosopher)
- Igor Efimov (chess player)
