= Ekaterini Pavlidou =

Greek chess player (born 1993)

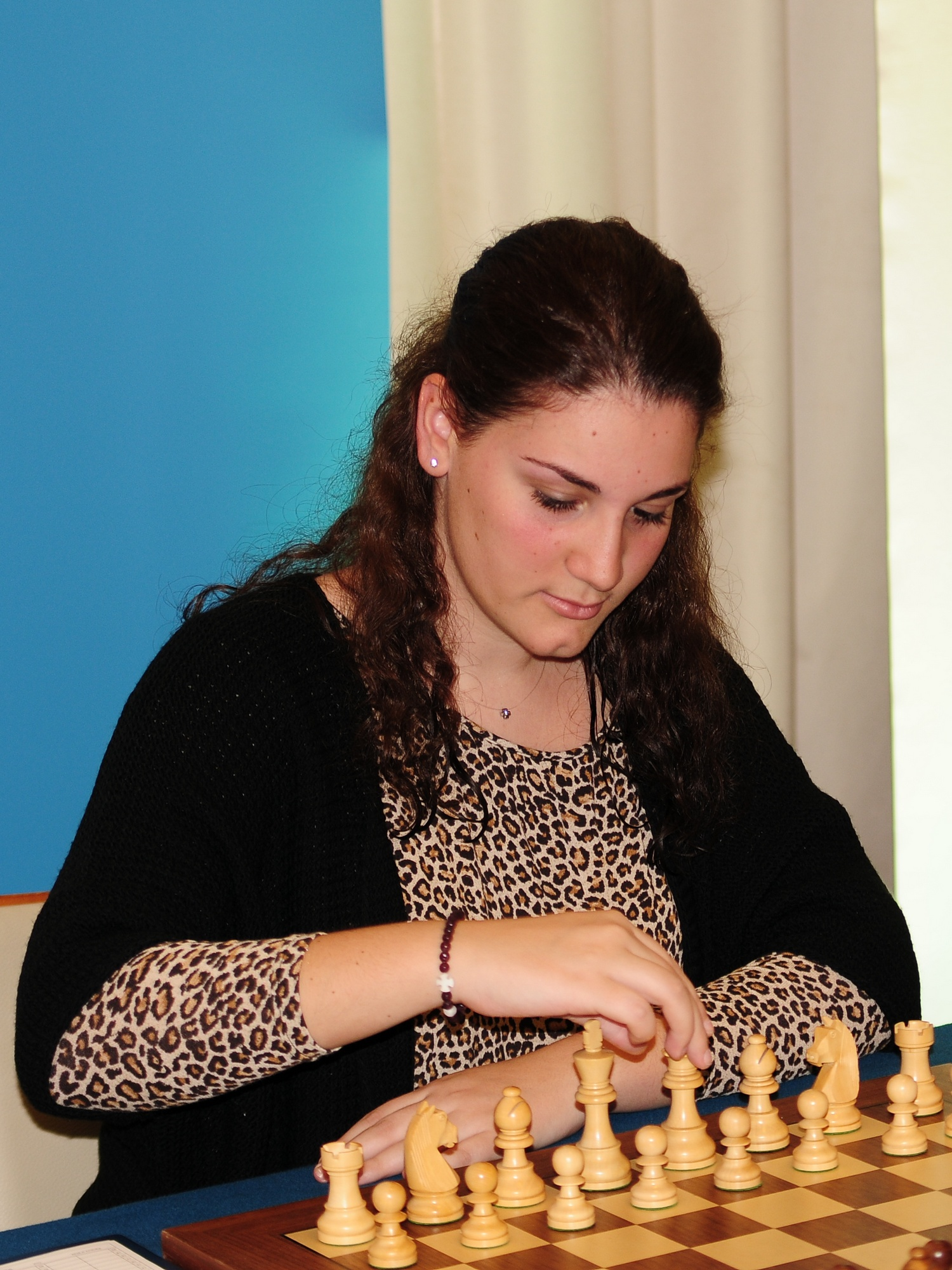
- Pavlidou in 2013

Personal information
- Born: 3 April 1993 (age 33)

Chess career
- Country: Greece
- Title: Woman International Master (2010)
- Peak rating: 2237 (August 2012)

Ekaterini Pavlidou (Greek: Αικατερίνη Παυλίδου; born 3 April 1993) is a Greek chess player who holds the title of Woman International Master (WIM, 2010). She is a four-time Greek Women Chess Champion (2012, 2013, 2015, 2017).

== Chess career ==
Multiple times winner of Greek girl's chess championships in different age groups: U16 (2009), and U20 (2009, 2012).

In Greek women's chess championships Ekaterini Pavlidou won 4 gold (2012, 2013, 2015, 2017) medals.

In 2012 in Beirut she won Mediterranean Women's Chess Championship.

Ekaterini Pavlidou played for Greece in the Women's Chess Olympiads:

- In 2012, at reserve board in the 40th Chess Olympiad (women) in Istanbul (+4, =1, -2),
- In 2014, at third board in the 41st Chess Olympiad (women) in Tromsø (+3, =4, -2),
- In 2016, at second board in the 42nd Chess Olympiad (women) in Baku (+3, =2, -5).

Ekaterini Pavlidou played for Greece in the World Team Chess Championship:

- In 2011, at fourth board in the 3rd Women's World Team Chess Championship 2011 in Mardin (+2, =4, -2).

Ekaterini Pavlidou played for Greece in the European Team Chess Championships:

- In 2007, at third board in the 7th European Team Chess Championship (women) in Heraklion (+2, =0, -6),
- In 2011, at reserve board in the 9th European Team Chess Championship (women) in Porto Carras (+3, =1, -3),
- In 2013, at second board in the 10th European Team Chess Championship (women) in Warsaw (+2, =1, -4),
- In 2015, at second board in the 11th European Team Chess Championship (women) in Reykjavík (+3, =0, -5),
- In 2017, at third board in the 12th European Team Chess Championship (women) in Crete (+1, =3, -2).

In 2010, she was awarded the FIDE Woman International Master (WIM) title.
