= Spyros B. Pavlides =

Greek geologist

Spyros B. Pavlides (Σπύρος Β. Παυλίδης) is a Greek geologist and professor of geology and physical geography and vice president of the school of geology at the Aristotle University of Thessaloniki in Greece. His primary interests include neotectonics, paleoseismology, archaeoseismology, and the use of geological data for seismic hazard assessment. His Ph.D. subject in 1985 was "Neotectonic evolution of the Florina-Vegoritis-Ptolemais basin (W. Macedonia, Greece)"

== Bibliography ==
- Yildirim Dilek and Spyros Pavlides (2006) "Postcollisional tectonics and magmatism in the Mediterranean region and Asia", Geological Society of America, ISBN 978-0-8137-2409-6
- Mountrakis D., Kilias A., Pavlides S. and others (1999) "Neotectonic Map of Greece", University of Thessaloniki.
- Pavlides, S. B. (1996) Palaeoseismology: a branch of Neotectonics linking Geological, Seismological and Archaeological data. Fitch Laboratory, British School at Athens. Athens
- Pavlides, S, Mountrakis, D. (1986). Neotectonics: an Introduction to Recent Geological Structures. University Studio Press. Thessaloniki. Greece. (in Greek)
