= Georgios Anastassopoulos =

Greek politician (1935–2019)

- Γεώργιος Αναστασόπουλος
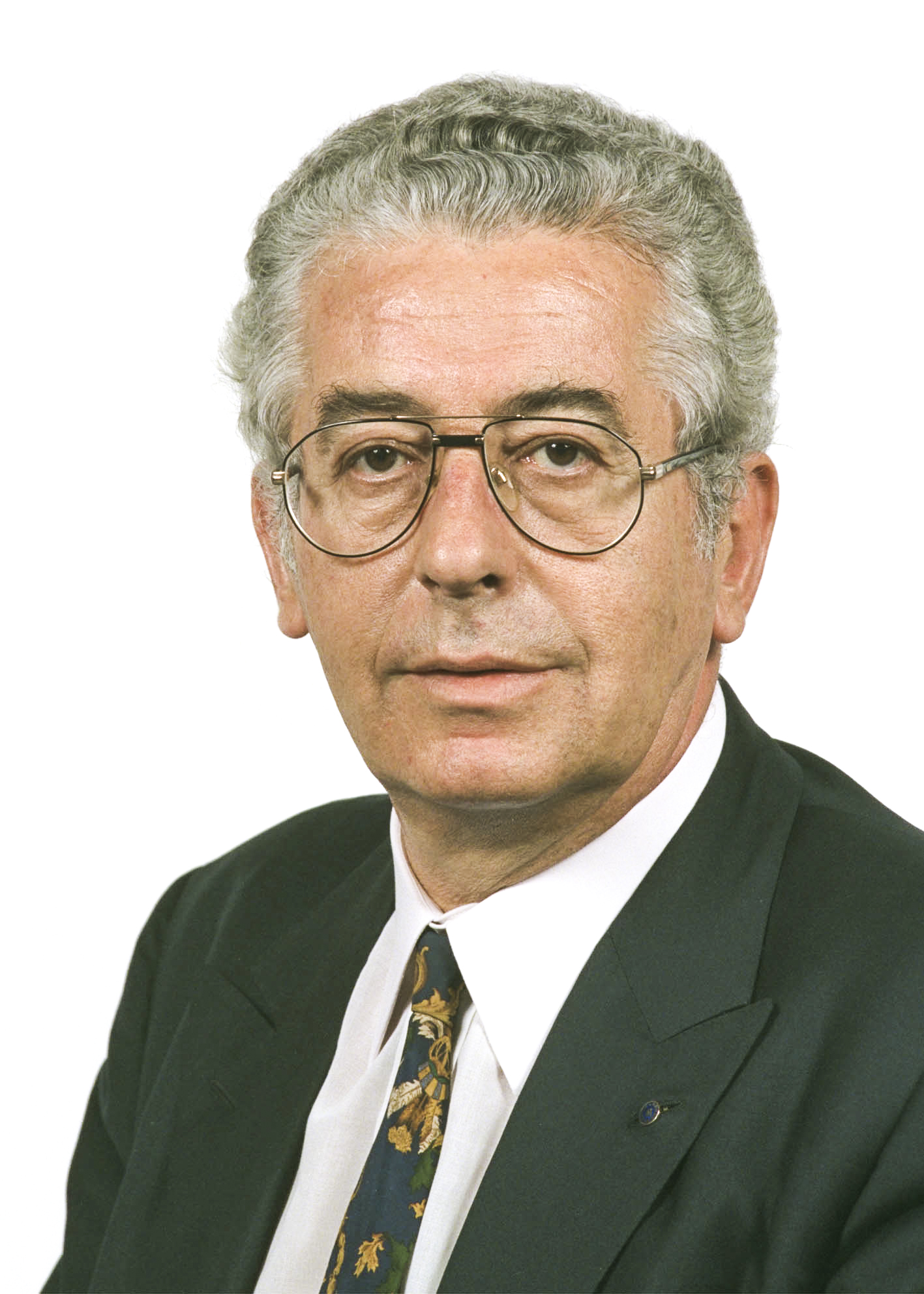
- Anastassopoulos in 1994

Member of the European Parliament for Greece
- In office 1984 – 20 July 1999

Personal details
- Born: 25 September 1935
- Died: 12 July 2019 (aged 83)
- Party: New Democracy
- Education: University of Athens; King's College London

Georgios Anastassopoulos (Greek: Γεώργιος Αναστασόπουλος; 25 September 1935 – 12 July 2019) was a Greek politician who served as a Member of the European Parliament (MEP).

Anastassopoulos was educated at the University of Athens where he studied law; and later at King's College London, where he studied comparative European law. He served three terms as MEP between 1984 and 1999. Between 1989 and 1999, he served four terms as Vice-President of the Assembly, and was also president of the parliament's Transport Committee. He was the permanent delegate to the UNESCO for Greece, and was elected president over the General Convention of UNESCO for 2007 and 2009.

He died on 12 July 2019 at the age of 83.
