= Igor Miladinović (chess player) =

Serbian chess grandmaster (born 1974)

Igor Miladinović Игор Миладиновић
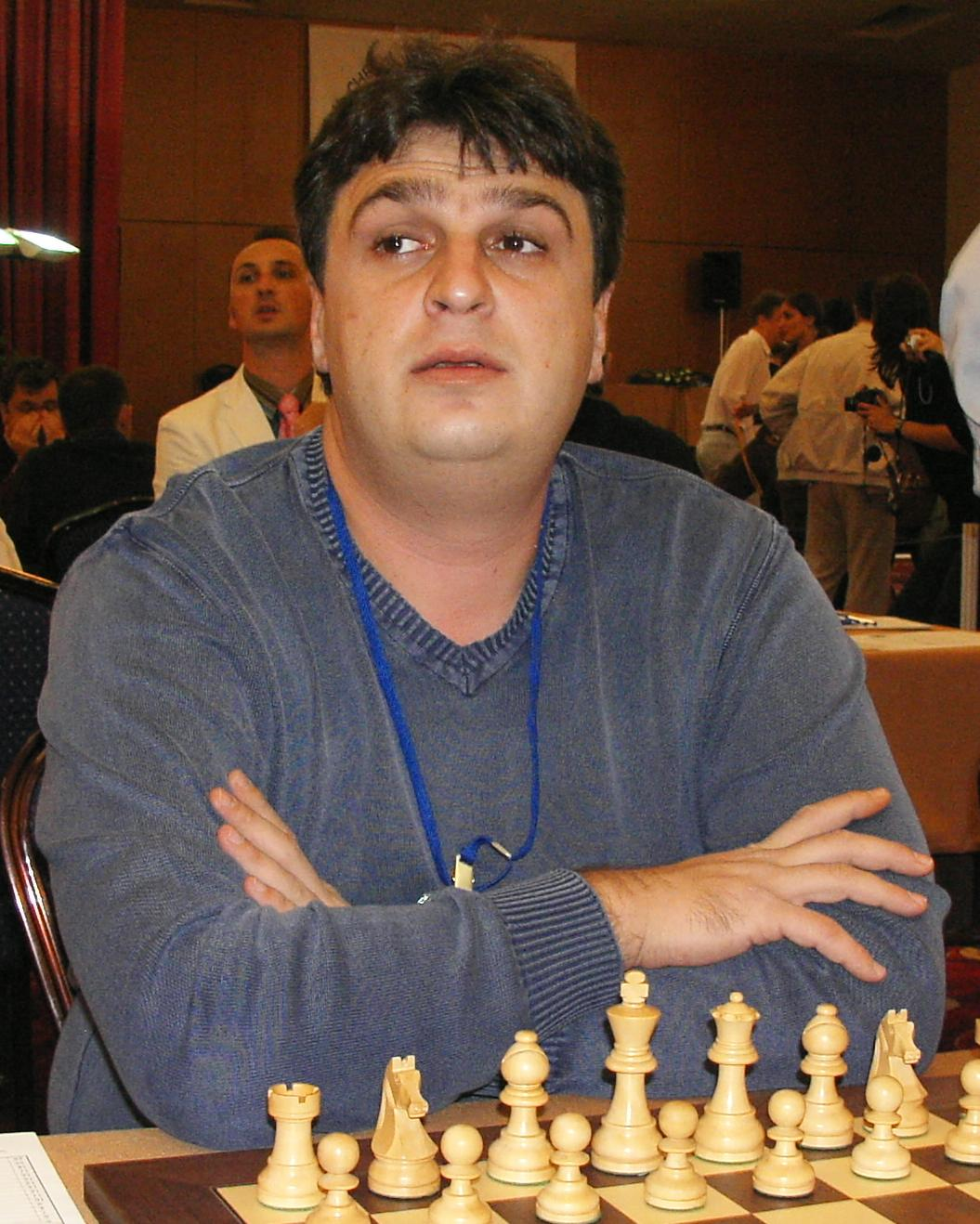

Personal information
- Born: January 25, 1974 (age 52) Niš, SR Serbia, SFR Yugoslavia

Chess career
- Country: Yugoslavia (until 1995); Greece (1995–2006); Serbia (since 2006)
- Title: Grandmaster (1993)
- FIDE rating: 2454 (July 2026)
- Peak rating: 2630 (July 2004)
- Peak ranking: No. 65 (July 2004)

Igor Miladinović (Serbian Cyrillic: Игор Миладиновић; born 25 January 1974) is a Serbian chess grandmaster.

== Chess career ==
Miladinović won the 1993 World Junior Chess Championship and at the end of the year was declared athlete of the Year in FR Yugoslavia (Serbia and Montenegro). In 1994 he played for FR Yugoslavia in the Moscow Olympiad, winning a bronze medal on 4th board. Around 1995 he moved to Greece, playing for that country in four Olympiads from 1996 to 2002. His request to again represent Serbia & Montenegro was granted by FIDE on 5 October 2005.

Miladinović was co-winner along with Joël Lautier, winning his individual game against the latter in the 6th edition of the strong invitation tournament Sigeman & Co. at Malmö 1998.

He won the 46th edition of the traditional Reggio Emilia chess tournament 2003/04 outright.

Miladinović later returned to Serbia and is affiliated with the Serbian Chess Federation.

He once was married to Woman Grandmaster Anna-Maria Botsari.

Awards
Preceded by Slobodan Branković	(Federal Republic of Yugoslavia) The Best Athlete of FR Yugoslavia; 1993	Succeeded by Jasna Šekarić
