= Krum Georgiev =

Bulgarian chess player (1958–2024)

Personal information
- Born: 24 May 1958 Pazardzhik, Bulgaria
- Died: 31 July 2024 (aged 66)

Chess career
- Country: Bulgaria
- Title: Grandmaster (1988)
- Peak rating: 2532 (July 2000)

Krum Ivanov Georgiev (Bulgarian: Крум Иванов Георгиев; 24 May 1958 – 31 July 2024) was a Bulgarian chess grandmaster. He is best known for beating future world champion Garry Kasparov in a wild game in Malta, 1980.

Georgiev was born in Pazardzhik on 24 May 1958. He earned the International Master (IM) title in 1977 and the Grandmaster (GM) title in 1988. He died on 31 July 2024, at the age of 66.
