= Vasilios Kotronias =

Greek chess grandmaster and writer (born 1964)

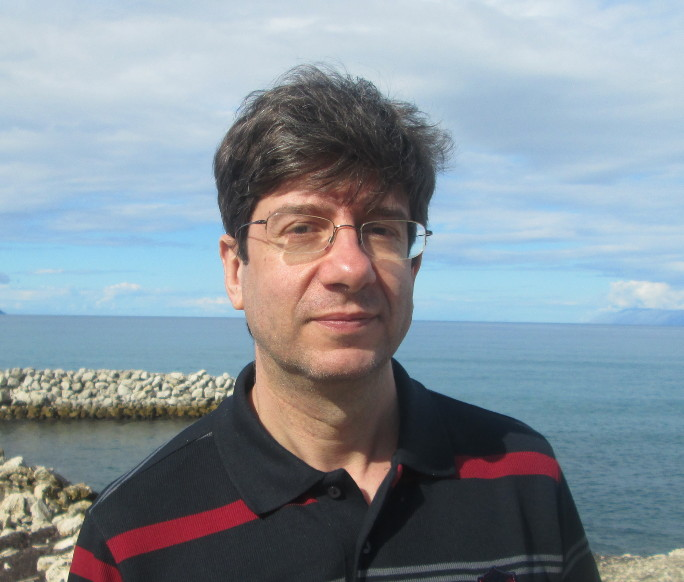
- Kotronias in 2014

Personal information
- Born: 25 August 1964 (age 61) Athens, Greece

Chess career
- Country: Greece; Cyprus (1998–2004)
- Title: Grandmaster (1990)
- Peak rating: 2628 (January 2008)
- Peak ranking: No. 44 (July 1996)

Vasilios Kotronias (Greek: Βασίλειος Κοτρωνιάς; first name sometimes spelled Vassilios; born 25 August 1964) is a Greek chess player and writer. He is a ten-time Greek champion (1986, 1987, 1988, 1990, 1991, 1992, 1994, 2006, 2010, 2014). Kotronias was awarded the titles of International Master in 1986 and Grandmaster in 1990 by FIDE. He was the first Greek chess player to become a Grandmaster.

Between 1998 and 2004, he represented Cyprus, but has since switched federations to become a Greek national player once again.

== International tournament record ==
- 1st 1988 Athens (Acropolis International)
- 1st 1993 Komotini
- 1st 1993 Corfu
- 1st 1994 Gausdal
- 1st 1995 Gausdal
- 1st 1996 Rishon le Zion
- 1st 1998 Panormo
- 1st 2003 Gibraltar Chess Festival (jointly with Nigel Short)
- equal 1st 2003/04 Hastings International Chess Congress
- equal first at 2008 Cappelle-la-Grande Open
- 1st 2020 Ikaros Chess Festival

== Most played openings ==
With the White pieces	With the Black pieces
Sicilian (212)	Sicilian Defense (188)
Ruy Lopez (117)	King's Indian (140)
French Defense (71)	Sicilian Richter-Rauser (55)
Ruy Lopez, Closed (62)	English (27)
French Tarrasch (57)	Queen's Pawn Game (25)
Caro-Kann (49)	Queen's Gambit Declined (18)

== Team events ==
In team chess, he has participated in many Chess Olympiads since 1984, including eight on top board, with an overall score of +63 −29 = 62 (61%). In seven appearances at the European Team Chess Championships, all played at board one, he made a score of +19 −13 = 26. At León, in 2001, he earned an individual silver medal for his score of 5½/8. He also earned a bronze medal for his performance on the second board at the Dresden Olympiad 2008 and a gold medal for his performance on the reserve board at the European Team Championship 2013 in Warsaw.

== Politics ==
He was a candidate for the European Parliament with The River, in the elections of 25 May 2014. After leaving the River, Kotronias joined Syriza and was a candidate in the 2019 general elections. He failed to get elected, as he finished last amongst the 18 candidates of his party.

== Notable games ==
- Vasilios Kotronias vs Evgeny Tomashevsky, European Individual Championships (2013), Spanish Game: Morphy Defense. Steinitz Deferred (C79), 1-0
- Vasilios Kotronias vs Hikaru NakamuraGibtelecom (2009), Caro-Kann Defense: Classical Variation. Main lines (B18), 1-0
- Peter Heine Nielsen vs Vasilios Kotronias, Hastings 2004, King's Indian Defense: Orthodox Variation, Classical System Neo-Classical Line (E98), 0-1
- Vasilios Kotronias vs Nikolaos Skalkotas, 34th Greek Teams Championship 2005, Spanish Game: Closed Variations, Chigorin Defense (C99), 1-0
- Laurent Fressinet vs Vasilios Kotronias, 12th European Individual Championship (2011), King's Indian Defense: Orthodox Variation. Gligoric-Taimanov System (E92), 0-1

== Publications ==
- Kotronias, Vassilios (1994). Beating the Caro-Kann. Batsford Chess Library. ISBN 978-0805032840.
- Kotronias, Vassilios (1996). Beating the Flank Openings. Batsford Chess Library. ISBN 978-0805047318.
- Kotronias, Vassilios; Tzermiadianos, Andreas (2004). Beating the Petroff. Batsford. ISBN 978-0713489194.
- Kotronias, Vassilios (2011). The Grandmaster Battle Manual. Quality Chess. ISBN 978-1906552527.
- Kotronias, Vassilios (2013). Kotronias on the King's Indian. Fianchetto Systems. Quality Chess. ISBN 978-1906552503.
- Kotronias, Vassilios; Logothetis, Sotiris (2014). Carlsen's Assault on the Throne. Quality Chess. ISBN 978-1906552220.
- Kotronias, Vassilios (2014). The Sicilian Sveshnikov. Quality Chess. ISBN 978-1907982927.
- Kotronias, Vassilios (2015). Kotronias on the King's Indian. Mar del Plata I. Quality Chess. ISBN 978-1907982552.
- Kotronias, Vassilios (2015). Kotronias on the King's Indian. Mar del Plata II. Quality Chess. ISBN 978-1907982569.
- Kotronias, Vassilios (9 December 2015). Beating the Anti-Sicilians. Quality Chess. ISBN 978-1-907982-63-7.
- Kotronias, Vassilios (2016). The Safest Scandinavian. Chess Stars. ISBN 978-619-7188-06-6.
- Kotronias, Vassilios (2020). The Modern Spanish: Breyer and Zaitsev Systems. Russel Enterprises. ISBN 9781949859201.
- Kotronias, Vassilios (2023). The London Files: Defanging the London System. Russel Enterprises. ISBN 9781949859706.
- Kotronias, Vassilios (2025). Tackling the Trompowsky and Torre Attacks. Russell Enterprises. ISBN 978-196-3885-06-4.
- Kotronias, Vassilios (2025). The Benko Bible. Russel Enterprises. ISBN 9781949859997.
