= Athanasios Mastrovasilis =

Greek chess grandmaster (born 1979)

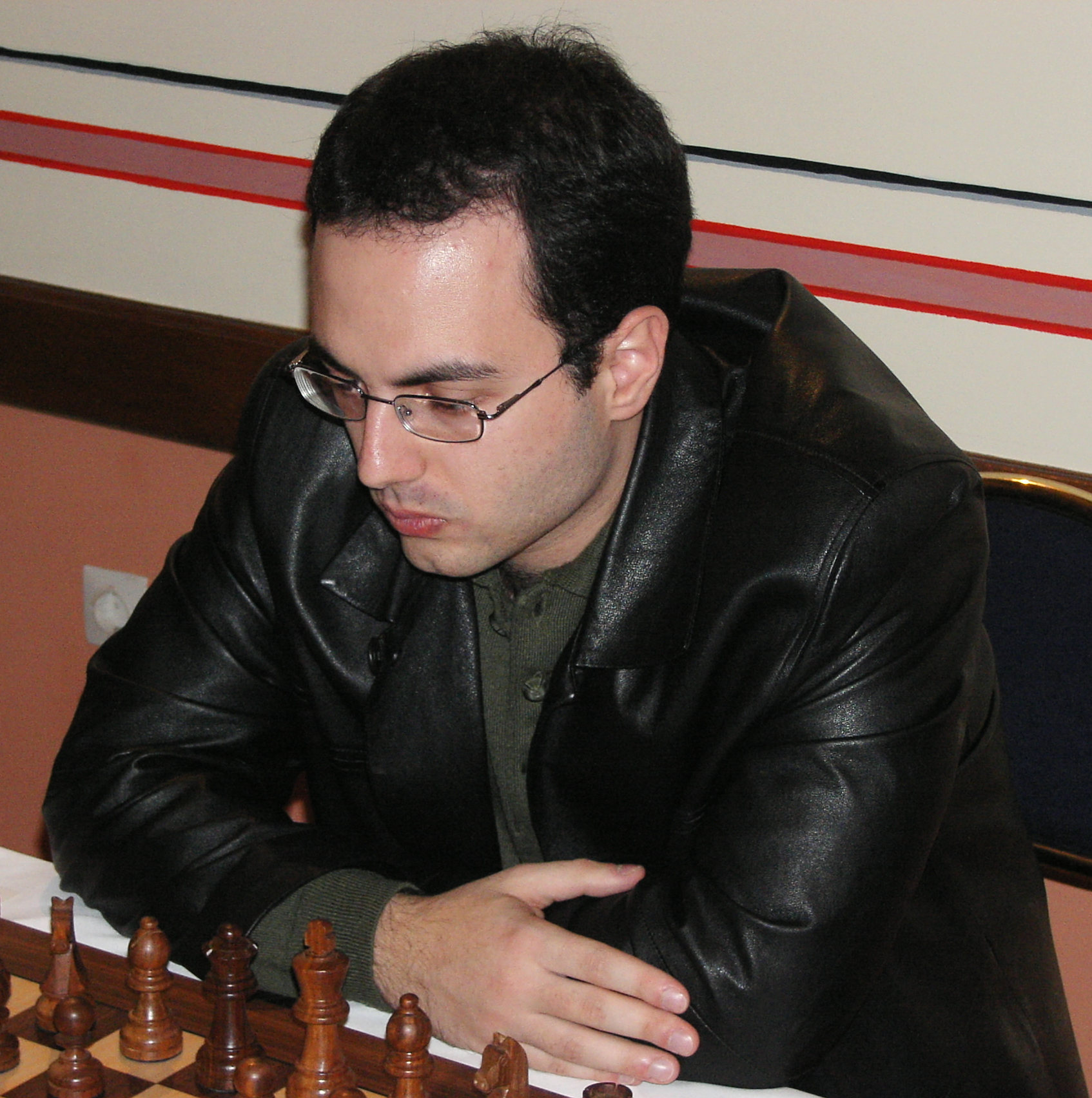
- Athanasios Mastrovasilis in 2005

Personal information
- Born: 18 April 1979 (age 47) Thessaloniki, Greece

Chess career
- Country: Greece
- Title: Grandmaster (2005)
- FIDE rating: 2430 (July 2026)
- Peak rating: 2556 (September 2010)

Athanasios Mastrovasilis (Greek: Αθανάσιος Μαστροβασίλης; born 18 April 1979) is a Greek chess Grandmaster (2005), three-time Greek Chess Championship winner (2015, 2018, 2021).

== Chess career ==
In the years 1993–1999 Athanasios Mastrovasilis represented Greece at the World Youth Chess Championship (three times) and European Youth Chess Championship (also three times), achieving his best result in 1995 in Guarapuava, where he took 5th place in the World Youth Chess Championship in U16 age group.

In the second half of 2010s Athanasios Mastrovasilis was one of the top Greek chess players. He competed many times in the individual finals of the Greek Chess Championship, winning the title of national champion three times (in 2015, 2018, and 2021).

In 2004 he won Acropolis International chess tournament.

Athanasios Mastrovasilis played for Greece in the Chess Olympiads:

- In 2004, at second reserve board in the 36th Chess Olympiad in Calvià (+1, =1, -0),
- In 2010, at reserve board in the 39th Chess Olympiad in Khanty-Mansiysk (+3, =3, -1),
- In 2014, at reserve board in the 41st Chess Olympiad in Tromsø (+4, =2, -2),
- In 2016, at fourth board in the 42nd Chess Olympiad in Baku (+1, =6, -1),
- In 2018, at reserve board in the 43rd Chess Olympiad in Batumi (+2, =4, -2).
- In 2022, at third board in the 44th Chess Olympiad in Chennai (+3, =3, -2).

Athanasios Mastrovasilis played for Greece and Greece 2 in the European Team Chess Championships:

- In 2009, at first reserve board in the 17th European Team Chess Championship in Novi Sad (+2, =4, -1),
- In 2015, at fourth board in the 20th European Team Chess Championship in Reykjavík (+2, =1, -3),
- In 2017, at fourth board in the 21st European Team Chess Championship in Hersonissos (+2, =4, -2),
- In 2019, at reserve board in the 22nd European Team Chess Championship in Batumi (+2, =5, -1).

Athanasios Mastrovasilis played for Greece in the World Team Chess Championship:

- In 2010, at second reserve board in the 7th World Team Chess Championship in Bursa (+1, =2, -1) and won individual silver medal.

In 2000, Athanasios Mastrovasilis was awarded the FIDE International Master (IM) title and received the FIDE Grandmaster (GM) title five years later. He achieved the highest rating in his career on September 1, 2010, with a score of 2556 points, he was then 6th among Greek chess players.

== Personal life ==
His brother is chess grandmaster Dimitrios Mastrovasilis.
