= Anna-Maria Botsari =

Greek chess player (born 1972)

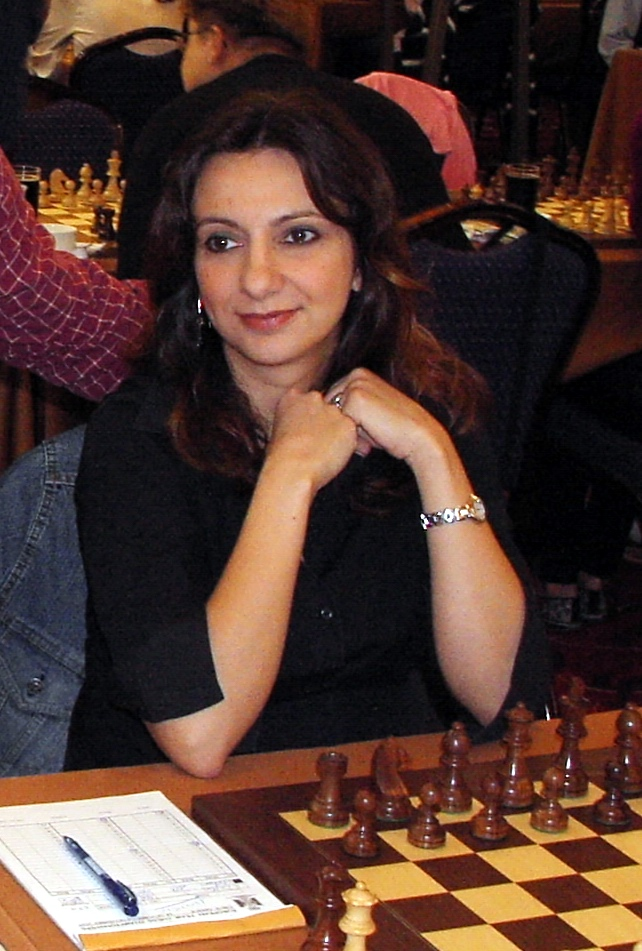
- Anna-Maria Botsari at EuroChess Iraklion in 2007

Personal information
- Born: 5 October 1972 (age 53) Kavala, Greece

Chess career
- Country: Greece
- Title: Woman Grandmaster (1993)
- Peak rating: 2394 (October 2003)

Anna-Maria Botsari (Greek: Άννα-Μαρία Μπότσαρη; born 5 October 1972) is a Greek chess player holding the title of Woman Grandmaster (WGM).

== Chess career ==
Botsari has won, or jointly won, the Greek Women's Chess Championship eight times. She was a bronze medalist at the 1990 World Junior Chess Championship and silver medalist in 1991. She was the highest rated Greek female chess player for more than a decade.

Botsari was a participant in the 1991, 1993 and 1996 World Women's Chess Championship Interzonal tournaments. She scored 9/18 in the 1990 Women's Interzonal in Azov, 6/13 in the 1991 Women's Interzonal in Subotica, and 7.5/13 at the 1993 Women's Interzonal in Jakarta.

Botsari has represented Greece in fifteen Chess Olympiads from 1986 to 2014. Her best results were at the 28th Chess Olympiad in Thessaloniki in 1988, where she scored 8.5/12 and finished sixth on the first reserve board, and the 35th Chess Olympiad in Bled in 2002, where she scored 8.5/13 with a performance rating of 2435, to finish ninth on board one.

She has represented Greece in nine European Women's Team Chess Championships from 1992 to 2011, and won a gold medal on second board in Debrecen 1992. She won two individual gold medals (in Mangalia 1992 and Varna 1994) and a team gold medal (in Varna 1992) in the Women's Chess Balkaniads.

Between 27 and 28 February 2002, Anna-Maria Botsari achieved a new Guinness World Record in Kalavryta, Greece, by playing 1102 opponents in a little over 30 hours. Her score was +1095 =7–0.

Botsari gained the Woman Grandmaster (WGM) title in 1993.

She won the Women's title of the 7th Mediterranean Chess Championship in Rijeka 2009.

== Personal life ==
She was once married to Serbian Grandmaster Igor Miladinović. She currently resides in Athens with her daughter Melina Pagoni from her second husband.
