= Victor Soultanbeieff =

Russian and Belgian chess player (1895–1972)

Victor Soultanbéieff
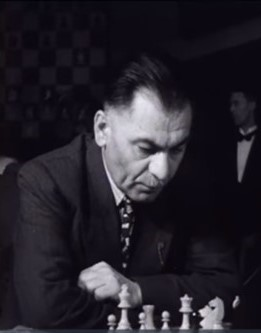
- Soultanbeieff in 1947

Personal information
- Born: Victor Ivanovich Soultanbéieff; 11 November 1895 Yekaterinoslav, Russian Empire
- Died: 9 February 1972 (aged 76) Liège, Belgium

Chess career
- Country: Russian Empire → Soviet Russia (before 1921); Belgium (after 1921)

Victor Ivanovich Soultanbéieff (Note: Other spellings include: Sultanbajew, Sultanbaev, Sultanbeev, Sultanbejeff, and Sultanbaieff.) (Russian: Виктор Иванович Султанбеев, romanized: Viktor Ivanovich Sultanbeyev; 11 November 1895 – 9 February 1972) was a Russian and Belgian chess master.

== Life ==
An illustration from Internationaal Schaaktournooi Zaanstreek 1946 by W.A.T. Schelfhout and C. Kottnauer (Amsterdam, 1946)

Born in Yekaterinoslav, Russian Empire (now Ukraine), Soultanbéieff learned to play chess rather late, but he improved fast. In 1914 he won the city championship. In World War I, he fought in the Russian army. In 1918 he won the city championship again. After the Bolshevik Revolution, in 1920, he moved to Gallipoli with the army of Pyotr Nikolayevich Wrangel. At the end of 1921 he sought asylum in Belgium. After a short stay in Brussels he moved to Liège, where he would stay for the rest of his life.

In 1923 he participated for the first time in the Belgian Chess Championship, a championship which he would win 5 times; in 1932 (jointly with Boruch Israel Dyner), 1934, 1943, 1957, and 1961. In 1923 he finished 4th, but impressed with his play. He had to combine chess with his work, which resulted in a low number of international tournaments and sometimes bad playing conditions. Nevertheless, he participated in some important tournaments like Hastings International Chess Congress and the Hoogovens tournament.

Soultanbéieff was made a national master in 1931 and International Arbiter in 1964.

== Chess ==
=== Playing style ===
Soultanbéieff was known for his aggressive playing style, which sometimes resulted in short, brilliant games, but which sometimes led to unnecessary defeat. Some of his games are still famous like his games against Liubarski, 1928 or Borodin, 1943. Unlike many other players, Soultanbéieff stayed true to his attacking style when he grew old. He left his name to the Soultanbeieff Variation, a line in the Slav Defense which was introduced in the correspondence game Macht–Soultanbéieff, 1931–2: 1.d4 d5 2.c4 c6 3.Nf3 Nf6 4.Nc3 dxc4 5.a4 e6.

=== Tournament record ===
Although he had won a few tournaments in Russia, his chess career only took off when he came to Belgium. He participated in a total of 22 Belgian championships between 1923 and 1969. He won it 5 times (1932 (shared with Boruch Israel Dyner), 1934, 1943, 1957*, 1961*), took 3 times 2nd place (1938 (Shared with Arthur Dunkelblum), 1945*, 1958*) and one time 3rd place (1962). (Tournaments marks with * were FBE-championships.)

Due to his professional activities, international tournaments were rare. Nevertheless, he achieved some remarkable results, which are contained in the following table:

Year, place (Event)	Winner	Soultanbéieff's result
1924, Brussels	Edgard Colle	5th
1926, Spa, Belgium (International)	Friedrich Sämisch & George Alan Thomas 8½/11	5th, shared with Arthur Dunkelblum and Massimiliano Romih, 6/11
1926/27, Hastings (Hastings International Chess Congress, challengers)	Georges Koltanowski, 7/9	2nd, 6½/9
1929, Maastricht (Quadrangular tournament)	Marcel Engelmann	2nd
1929 Ramsgate	José Raúl Capablanca, 5½/7	6th, 4/7
1930 Liège (International tournament)	Savielly Tartakower, 8½/11	11th, 4/11
1930 Liège (Quadrangular tournament)	Soultanbéieff, 2½/3	1st, 2½/3 before Isaías Pleci
1930/31 Hastings (Hastings International Chess Congress Major A)	Soultanbéieff, 7½/9	1st, 7½/9 before Emmanuel Sapira
1936, Ostend	Erik Lundin, 7½/9	Shared 7th with George Alan Thomas, 4/9
1946 Maastricht	Max Euwe, 7½/9	7th, 4½/9
1946 Zaandam	Max Euwe, 9½/11	9th, 4/11
1947 Baarn (A2-group)	Savielly Tartakower, 6½/7	Shared 5th, with 3 Dutch players, 2½/7
1947 Brussels (6 masters tournament)	Albéric O'Kelly de Galway, 4/5	Shared 2nd with Frits Van Seters, 3/5
1950 Beverwijk (Hoogovens chess tournament)	Jan Hein Donner, 7/9	9th, 2½/9
1954 Dublin (An Tóstal tournament)	Albéric O'Kelly de Galway, 4½/5	Shared 3rd with Leonard Barden, 3/5

Being one of the best Belgian players of his time, he represented Belgium on various occasions, notably on the 1933 Chess Olympiad in Folkestone. Playing on 1st board, he achieved 4/14, including a victory over Savielly Tartakower.

During his long career, Soultanbéieff played a few short matches. His most notable results in this category were a drawn match against Arthur Dunkelblum (1932; +1−1=2), a drawn match against Georges Koltanowski (1935; +1−1=2) and a lost match against Paul Devos (1946; +1−2=3).

=== Correspondence chess ===
Soultanbéieff was a gifted correspondence player too, although again, his professional activities left not much time for this. He started playing correspondence chess tournaments when he was still in Russia. He became first a member, later an honorary member of the EB/BS. He played 1st board for Belgium I in the first correspondence chess Olympiad, scoring 3/6. Another notable result was a drawn match against Aleksandras Machtas, future champion of Lithuania.

=== Writing ===
Like many chess players, Soultanbéieff also wrote about chess. He wrote a chess column for various local newspapers and collaborated with many outstanding chess periodicals like Shakmati Listock (later Shakhmaty v SSSR), l'Échiquier Belge and Échec et Mat. He wrote a book on the world championship match between José Raúl Capablanca and Alexander Alekhine, which appeared in 1929, published by l'Échiquier editions. He commented the games of the Ostend 1936 tournament for the tournament book and published a collection of his own games under the title Guide pratique du jeu des combinaisons, which was later reprinted as Le Maître de l'attaque.

== See also ==
- List of Soviet and Eastern Bloc defectors

== Sources ==
- Soultanbéieff, V. (1974), Le maître de l'attaque: guide pratique du jeu des combinaison (in French), Paris: Au Pion passé; Impensé redical, OCLC 461447243
