= Emmanuel Sapira =

Belgian chess master

Emmanuel Sapira (1900–1943) was a Romanian-born Belgian chess master.

Born in Romania, he moved to Belgium. He shared 2nd, behind George Koltanowski, at Ghent 1923 (Belgian Championship), took 2nd at Brussels 1923 (Koltanowski won), finished 1st at Antwerp 1924 (Quadrangular), took 10th at Brussels 1924 (Edgard Colle won), took 2nd at Brussels 1925 (Colle won), took 3rd at Spa 1926 (Fritz Sämisch and George Alan Thomas won), tied for 5–9th at Antwerp 1927 (Koltanowski won), and twice tied for 5–7th at Hastings 1927/28 and Hastings 1928/29, both Major A.

Sapira played for Belgium at first board in the 2nd Chess Olympiad at The Hague 1928, and in a match against "World" at Antwerp 1931.

He took 2nd at Hastings 1931/32 (Major A), took 6th at Antwerp 1932 (Koltanowski won), tied for 4–7th at Brussels 1937 (BEL-ch, Paul Devos and Alberic O'Kelly de Galway won), took 7th at Namur 1938 (BEL-ch, O'Kelly won).

Sapira and his parents escaped from Belgium to London during the Second World War; he died there in 1943.
