= 9th Chess Olympiad =

1950 chess tournament in Dubrovnik, Yugoslavia

The official poster for the Olympiad.

The 9th Chess Olympiad (Croatian: 9. Šahovska olimpijada), organized by the FIDE and comprising a team tournament, took place between August 20 and September 11, 1950, in Dubrovnik, FPR Yugoslavia (present day Croatia). 84 players from 16 nations played a total of 480 games. The acclaimed 1950 Dubrovnik chess set was designed and manufactured specifically for the Olympiad.

Chantal Chaudé de Silans played on the French team, making her the first woman to play in an official chess Olympiad.

== Results ==
=== Team standings ===
| # | Country | Players | Points |
|---|---|---|---|
| 1 | Yugoslavia | Gligorić, Pirc, Trifunović, Rabar, Vidmar Jr., Puc | 45½ |
| 2 | Argentina | Najdorf, Bolbochán Jul., Guimard, Rossetto, Pilnik | 43½ |
| 3 | West Germany | Unzicker, Schmid, Pfeiffer, Rellstab, Staudte | 40½ |
| 4 | United States | Reshevsky, Steiner, Horowitz, Shainswit, Kramer G., Evans | 40 |
| 5 | Netherlands | Euwe, van Scheltinga, Prins, Cortlever, Kramer H., Donner | 37 |
| 6 | Belgium | O'Kelly, Dunkelblum, Devos, Thibaut, Van Schoor | 32 |
| 7 | Austria | Beni, Busek, Müller, Palda, Lambert | 31½ |
| 8 | Chile | Castillo, Flores, Letelier, Maccioni | 30½ |
| 9 | France | Tartakower, Rossolimo, Hugot, Kesten, Chaudé de Silans, Crépeaux | 28½ |
| 10 | Finland | Böök, Ojanen, Niemi, Niemelä, Helle, Heikinheimo | 28 |
| 11 | Sweden | Sköld, Johansson, Bergkvist A., Bergkvist N., Lindquist, Stenborg | 27½ |
| 12 | Italy | Castaldi, Nestler, Porreca, Giustolisi, Primavera | 25 |
| 13 | Denmark | Poulsen, Enevoldsen, Pedersen, Kupferstich, Nielsen | 22 |
| 14 | Peru | Canal, Súmar, Zapata, Pinzón Solis | 21½ |
| 15 | Norway | Myhre, Vestøl, Morcken, Kongshavn, Opsahl | 15 |
| 16 | Greece | Mastihiadis, Panagopoulos, Zografakis, Boulahanis, Othoneos | 12 |

=== Team results ===
| Place | Country | 1 | 2 | 3 | 4 | 5 | 6 | 7 | 8 | 9 | 10 | 11 | 12 | 13 | 14 | 15 | 16 | + | − | = | Points |
|---|---|---|---|---|---|---|---|---|---|---|---|---|---|---|---|---|---|---|---|---|---|
| 1 | Yugoslavia | - | 1½ | 3 | 2 | 2½ | 3 | 2 | 2 | 3½ | 3 | 3 | 4 | 4 | 4 | 4 | 4 | 11 | 1 | 3 | 45½ |
| 2 | Argentina | 2½ | - | 2 | 1½ | 1½ | 4 | 3 | 3 | 2½ | 2½ | 3½ | 3½ | 4 | 3½ | 3½ | 3 | 12 | 2 | 1 | 43½ |
| 3 | West Germany | 1 | 2 | - | 1½ | 3 | 2½ | 2½ | 2½ | 3 | 3 | 4 | 3 | 3 | 2 | 3½ | 4 | 11 | 2 | 2 | 40½ |
| 4 | United States | 2 | 2½ | 2½ | - | 2 | 2½ | 2 | 3½ | 2 | 2½ | 2½ | 3 | 3 | 2½ | 4 | 3½ | 11 | 0 | 4 | 40 |
| 5 | Netherlands | 1½ | 2½ | 1 | 2 | - | 1½ | 2½ | 2½ | 2 | 2 | 2 | 3½ | 3½ | 2½ | 4 | 4 | 8 | 3 | 4 | 37 |
| 6 | Belgium | 1 | 0 | 1½ | 1½ | 2½ | - | 2½ | 2 | 2 | 3 | 3½ | 1½ | 3½ | 3 | 1½ | 3 | 7 | 6 | 2 | 32 |
| 7 | Austria | 2 | 1 | 1½ | 2 | 1½ | 1½ | - | 2½ | 2 | 1½ | 2½ | 1½ | 2 | 3 | 3½ | 3½ | 5 | 6 | 4 | 31½ |
| 8 | Chile | 2 | 1 | 1½ | ½ | 1½ | 2 | 1½ | - | 2 | 2½ | 2 | 3 | 2½ | 2½ | 4 | 2 | 5 | 5 | 5 | 30½ |
| 9 | France | ½ | 1½ | 1 | 2 | 2 | 2 | 2 | 2 | - | ½ | 1 | 2½ | 2½ | 2 | 3½ | 3½ | 4 | 5 | 6 | 28½ |
| 10 | Finland | 1 | 1½ | 1 | 1½ | 2 | 1 | 2½ | 1½ | 3½ | - | ½ | 3 | 1½ | 2 | 3 | 2½ | 5 | 8 | 2 | 28 |
| 11 | Sweden | 1 | ½ | 0 | 1½ | 2 | ½ | 1½ | 2 | 3 | 3½ | - | 1½ | 2 | 3 | 2 | 3½ | 4 | 7 | 4 | 27½ |
| 12 | Italy | 0 | ½ | 1 | 1 | ½ | 2½ | 2½ | 1 | 1½ | 1 | 2½ | - | 3 | 3½ | 2 | 2½ | 6 | 8 | 1 | 25 |
| 13 | Denmark | 0 | 0 | 1 | 1 | ½ | ½ | 2 | 1½ | 1½ | 2½ | 2 | 1 | - | 2 | 3 | 3½ | 3 | 9 | 3 | 22 |
| 14 | Peru | 0 | ½ | 2 | 1½ | 1½ | 1 | 1 | 1½ | 2 | 2 | 1 | ½ | 2 | - | 3 | 2 | 1 | 9 | 5 | 21½ |
| 15 | Norway | 0 | ½ | ½ | 0 | 0 | 2½ | ½ | 0 | ½ | 1 | 2 | 2 | 1 | 1 | - | 3½ | 2 | 11 | 2 | 15 |
| 16 | Greece | 0 | 1 | 0 | ½ | 0 | 1 | ½ | 2 | ½ | 1½ | ½ | 1½ | ½ | 2 | ½ | - | 0 | 13 | 2 | 12 |

=== Individual medals ===
The prizes for best individual results went to:

- Board 1: (Argentina) Miguel Najdorf and (West Germany) Wolfgang Unzicker 11 / 14 = 78.6%
- Board 2: (Argentina) Julio Bolbochán 11½ / 14 = 82.1%
- Board 3: (Socialist Federal Republic of Yugoslavia) Petar Trifunović 10 / 13 = 76.9%
- Board 4: (Socialist Federal Republic of Yugoslavia) Braslav Rabar 9 / 10 = 90.0%
- 1st reserve: (Argentina) Hermann Pilnik 7½ / 10 = 75.0%
- 2nd reserve: (United States) Larry Evans 9 / 10 = 90.0%
