= Marcel Engelmann =

Belgian chess player

Marcel Engelmann (born 1895, date of death unknown) was a Belgian chess master.

He won at Maastricht 1929 and took 3rd at Ghent 1929 (Edgard Colle won), both quadrangular tournaments. He took 2nd, behind Georges Koltanowski, at Verviers 1930 (Belgian Chess Championship), and tied for 4-6th at Liège 1934 (BEL-ch, Victor Soultanbeieff won).

Engelmann played for Belgium on third board in the 5th Chess Olympiad at Folkestone 1933.
