= 1900 in chess =

Events in chess in 1900:

== News ==
- The American team wins the Anglo-American cable match for the second consecutive year with the score 6–4. The top board game between Harry Pillsbury (USA) and Joseph Henry Blackburne (UK) is a draw as is the second board between Jackson Showalter (USA) and Francis Joseph Lee (UK). US Champion Frank Marshall loses a drawn game due to a time-keeping error. The US fails to start Marshall's clock when he cables a draw offer on his move, and Marshall loses on time. (The proper procedure is to transmit a move along with the draw offer to start the opponent's clock.)
- World Champion Emanuel Lasker wins the Paris tournament, ahead of Harry Pillsbury, Géza Maróczy and Frank Marshall. The tournament is held as part of the Exposition Universelle.
- Richard Teichmann wins the London tournament.
- Carl Schlechter wins the tournament at Vienna.
- First place at the German Chess Congress in Munich is shared by Maróczy, Pillsbury, and Schlechter.
- S. Lipschutz wins at New York.
- Mikhail Chigorin wins the 1900/01 Moscow tournament.
- The inaugural U.S. Open Championship is won by Louis Uedemann.
- Henry Ernest Atkins wins the British Championship.

== Births ==
- Josef Cukierman: (1900–1941) was a Polish-born French chess master.
- Marcel Engelmann Belgian master.
- Karl Poschauko was an Austrian chess master.
- Emmanuel Sapira (died 1943), Romanian-born Belgian chess master.
- January 29 – Irving Chernev (1900–1981), American chess player and author is born in Pryluky, Russian Empire.
- March 18 – Roberto Grau (1900–1944) Argentine master born in Buenos Aires.
- March 23 – José Joaquín Araiza (1900–1971), Mexican chess master.
- May 13 – Theodore Tylor (1900–1968), British chess player born in Bournville, England.
- August 13 – Nils Bergkvist Swedish master.
- October 24 – Robert Crépeaux (1900–1994), French master born in Grasse,
- November 24 – Kurt Richter (1900–1969), German International Master and chess writer born in Berlin.
- December 11 – Wolfgang Hasenfuss (1900–1944) Latvian master born in Jēkabpils, Russian Empire.

== Deaths ==
- February 12 – Ellen Gilbert, American correspondence player, dies in Hartford, Connecticut at age 62.
- April 18 – Rudolf Charousek, Hungarian master, dies in Budapest at age 26.
- August 12 – Wilhelm Steinitz, World Champion 1886–94, dies in poverty in New York City at age 64.
- November 10 – Luigi Centurini, Italian chess player and composer, dies in Genoa at age 80.
