= George Kramer =

George Kramer may refer to:

- George Kramer (philatelist), American philatelist
- George Kramer (chess player) (1929–2024), American chess player
- George Kramer (American football) (1894–1974), American football player
- George W. Kramer (1847–1938), American architect
- George Kramer, a character in Mannix played by Larry Linville
