= Staudte =

Staudte is a German surname. Notable people with the surname include:

- Hans-Hilmar Staudte (1911–1979), German jurist and chess player
- Miriam Staudte (born 1975), German politician
- Wolfgang Staudte (1906–1984), German film director, script writer and actor
