= Boruch Israel Dyner =

Belgian and Israeli chess player (1903–1979)

Boruch Israël Dyner (27 September 1903 – 13 February 1979) was a Belgian and Israeli chess master.

Born in Poland, he moved to Belgium. Dyner won thrice Belgian Chess Championship in 1932 (jointly with Victor Soultanbeieff), 1933 and 1935. He tied for 5-6th at Ostend 1936 (Erik Lundin won), tied for 4-7th at Brussels 1937 (BEL-ch, Alberic O'Kelly de Galway and Paul Devos won), took 8th at Ostend 1937 (Reuben Fine, Henri Grob and Paul Keres won), and took 6th at Namen 1938 (BEL-ch, O'Kelly won).

After World War II, he settled in Israel where took 13th at Haifa / Tel Aviv 1958 (Samuel Reshevsky won).
