= ICCF Belgium =

Chess organisation in Belgium

Belongs to the ICCF national member federations

The national federation history

== Early beginnings ==
The first Correspondence Chess games in Belgium were those played by Antwerp amateurs. They played between 1827 and 1829 two games against amateurs from Amsterdam. The names of the players are not known. The games, however, were kept for posterity in the book "Correspondenz-partien" by Ludwig Bledow, published in 1843 in Leipzig. Amsterdam won 2-0.

At the end of the 19th century, the "Cercle des Echecs de Bruxelles" organised several Correspondence Chess games, in 1895 against the French club of Lille and in 1899 against Paris. These games are mentioned at several places in the splendid bulletin "Revue d'Echecs" published from 1901 to 1909 by the Brussels club.

In January 1903, D. Janowski, in his column of the French weekly, "Le Monde Illustre", informed his readers that professor Isaac Rice from New-York, the well known chess sponsor, offered 1,000 francs (worth today US$10,000) to organise an international Correspondence Chess tournament on the "Rice Gambit", whose inventor he was. The start list was closed with nine entries, including the "Cercle des Bruxelles". The moves of the eight games were displayed with diagrams, on boards on the wall of the club.

At the end of 1903, the "Cercle des Bruxelles" started also a game against the club of Antwerp.

During the first world war, two fellows, E. Lancel and L. Weltjens, organised Correspondence Chess games among Belgian soldiers during their detachment at the Belgian Nortsea station De Panne against l'Echiquier d'Aquitaine (France).

After the war, several newspapers organised small Correspondence Chess tournaments: "La Nation Belge" by E. Lancel, "Le XXe Siecle" by L. Demey. In 1926, the well-known chess magazine " L'Echiquier", published from 1925 to 1938 by E. Lancel, also offered to its readers Correspondence Chess tournaments. Apparently they had little success as no results were published.

== Creation of A.J.E.C ==
In 1934 L. Demey founded the "ASSOCIATION BELGE DES JOUEURS d'ECHECS PAR CORRESPONDANCE" (AJEC). He also negotiated with the Postal Administration to enforce in Belgium the cheaper rate of printed matter to include chess cards. This favourable rate was abolished in 1984.

AJEC organised the first Belgian championship in several categories. AJEC also published a monthly duplicated bulletin. Albéric O'Kelly de Galway, who in 1962 became the third Correspondence Chess world champion, started his first Correspondence Chess games with AJEC. He won the Belgian Correspondence Chess championships of 1943 and 1944.

At the end of the thirties, differences of views regarding the bulletin arose. This led to the creation of a new Correspondence Chess association.

== Birth of L'Echiquier Belge / Het Belgisch Schaakbord ==
On 14 June 1942 a circular letter was sent to several chess amateurs to found a new association for Correspondence Chess players and problem amateurs. This letter was signed by F. De Vleeschouder (founder), E. Gooris (first president) and P. Van de Walle (first tournament director).

Two months later the first bilingual and printed monthly bulletin appeared. L'Echiquier Belge / Het Belgisch Schaakbord (EB/BS) was born and named according to the proposal of the next president (A. Marquet) after a written ballot.

The number of members grew rapidly thanks to the devotion and the clear-sightedness of pioneers: A. Marquet (president), L. Wittebroodt (secretary), M. Dragonetti (director of the bulletin), F. De Vleeschouder (treasurer), P. Peeters (promoter), P. Van de Walle (director of national tournaments) and M. Masson (director of international tournaments).

On 16.4.1945, F. De Vleeschouder died suddenly, but the increase in interest continued. At the beginning of 1946, EB/BS had 1,386 members, among them many players from abroad. It was a record. Since then, EB/BS has had ups and downs. Twice, in 1946 and in 1950, it nearly disappeared, due to unforeseen circumstances. Each time men of goodwill were found to restart the machine and ensure its continuity.

== Period of stability ==
From 1950 until 1982 EB/BS had a period of great stability. The monthly bulletin was published regularly without interruption. The number of members fluctuated between 700 and 900. The players were sorted into 5 categories according to their playing strength.

Already in January 1947 a national rating system was introduced for all players. The principles of that system are the same as those of the well-known Elo rating system.

In 1958, on the occasion of the World Exhibition in Brussels, EB/BS organised its first international CC tournament with 180 participants from 14 countries in 29 groups. The winner of the Champions group was W. Baumgartner (SWZ) ahead of J. Mollekens (BEL).

On an international level, after the victory of Albéric O'Kelly de Galway in the third World Championship, Coolen, Boey, Blockx and Maes participated with success in next finals of the World Championship.

All these activities were arranged by the board members: P. De Meulenaer (president 1952-1984), E. Rigaux (treasurer 1950-1979), S. Trepant and J. Adant (director of national tournaments 1950-1980), E. Rompteau and A. Donny (director of international tournaments 1950-1973), R. Verlinden (director of the bulletin 1950-1963), H. Muller (director of the bulletin since 1964), P. Clement (secretary 1965-1984), H. Hernalsteen (director of promotion 1969-1993), L. fontaine (director of the chess compositions 1953-1976) and his successor I. Vandemeulebroucke (since 1976) and C. Stancioff (rating director 1980-1996).

== Start of a new era ==
Since 1982/83 the number of members has declined each year as in other countries. The development of computer chess programs is without doubt a main reason for this decline.

In 1985 P. Clement took over the presidency, J. P. Dondelinger conducts the international tournaments (since 1984), financial affairs are by A. Breda (1985 till 1992) and by F. Huybrecht (since 1993), national tournaments are led by L. Schepers (1982–1998) and since 1998 by F. Huybrecht.

In 1992, for its 50th Jubilee, EB/Bs organised an original tournament opposing 6 of the main Belgian postal players against 5 of the strongest over the board players. Fide Master Geenen won, ahead of CCGM Boey both with 7.5 out of 10. A booklet (33 pages) containing all the games, most of them with comments was published.

In recent years tournaments by fax and E-mail, led by W. Palmkoeck since 1998 have been organised. G. Boonet won the first and second (1998–1999) national E-mail championship. The following winners were : 2000 Surmont and 2001 Versavel.

Each year the EB/Bs organises the following official tournaments (postal and E-mail):

Championship of Belgium (national individual championship) National individual championships of 1st, 2nd, 3rd and 4th categories. National individual ladies and junior championship National team championship Tournaments and matches.

== The national championship ==
60th. André Everaet; 61st. Yen Peeren; 62nd. Alexis van Osmael; 63rd. Dirk Ghysens; 64th. Frederic Mignon; 65th. Dirk Ghysens; 66th. Dirk Ghysens; 67th. Dirk Ghysens; 68th. Jean-Marc Derisse;

International events with the national team

Olympiad Regional tournaments

Titled players

== Grandmaster ==
- Jozef Boey
- Marc Geenen
- Valeer Maes
- Albéric O'Kelly de Galway
- Richard Polaczek
- Christophe Pauwels

== Senior International Master ==
- Francis Cottegnie
- Philippe Dusart
- Frederic Mignon
- Etienne Van Leeuwen
- Boni Vandermeulen
- Alex Van Osmael
- Hans Veen

== International Master ==
- Jan Bex
- Roland Beyen
- Guido Boonet
- Georges De Coninck
- Jan Delabie
- Jean-Pierre Dondelinger
- Frans Huybrecht
- Andr Janssens
- Peter Jonckheere
- Fernand Joseph
- Jacques Leroy
- Guy Monaville
- Jean-Michel Noseda
- Jacques Roose
- Herman Sneppe
- Liban Van Damme
- Marcel Van tricht
- Boni Vandermeulen

== International Ladies Master ==
- Mia Poppe
- Brigitte Vandecasteele

International tournaments that are organized by the national federation
