= Maccioni =

Maccioni is a surname. Notable people with the surname include:

- Alejandro Maccioni Seisdedos (1919—2014), Chilean chess player and pediatrician
- Antonio Machoni or Antonio Maccioni (1671–1753), Italian jesuit, linguist and cartographer
- Enrico Maccioni (born 1940), Italian painter of contemporary art
- Giovanni Battista Maccioni (floruit 1651–1674), Italian composer, and librettist
- Pierre-Henry Maccioni (born 1948), French civil servant
- Sirio Maccioni (1932-2020), Italian restaurateur and author
- Sonia Maccioni (born 1966), Italian athletics champions in women’s marathon
