= Degrande =

Degrande is a surname. Notable people with the surname include:

- Ida Degrande (1910–?), Belgian middle-distance runner
- Marigje Degrande (born 1992), Belgian chess player
