= Robert Lemaire =

Belgian chess player

Personal information
- Born: 23 July 1916
- Died: 27 June 1994 (aged 77)

Chess career
- Country: Belgium

Robert Lemaire (23 July 1916 – 27 June 1994) was a Belgian chess player, Belgian Chess Championships winner (1950).

== Biography ==
From the mid-1940s to end of 1950s Robert Lemaire was one of Belgium's leading chess players. He was a multiple medalist of the Belgian Chess Championship. In 1946, in Antwerp Robert Lemaire shared 1st – 2nd place with Albéric O'Kelly de Galway in Belgian Chess Championship but lost additional match for the title – 0:4. In 1950, in Ghent he won Belgian Chess Championship. In 1952, in Ghent he ranked 2nd in Belgian Chess Championship. In 1955, in Merksem Robert Lemaire shared 1st – 3rd place in Belgian Chess Championship but ranked only 3rd in additional tournament for the title of champion (tournament won Jos Gobert). In 1960, in Ghent he shared 1st – 2nd place in this tournament but remained 2nd after the additional factor.

Robert Lemaire played for Belgium in the Chess Olympiad:

- In 1954, at fourth board in the 11th Chess Olympiad in Amsterdam (+9, =2, -7).

Robert Lemaire played for Belgium in the Clare Benedict Cup:

- In 1955, at third board in the 2nd Clare Benedict Chess Cu in Mont Pèlerin (+0, =1, -4).
