= Opsahl =

Opsahl is a Norwegian surname. Notable people with the surname include:

- Allan Opsahl (1924–1990), American ice hockey defenseman
- Arve Opsahl (1921–2007), Norwegian movie and stage actor, singer and stand-up comedian
- Bjørn Opsahl (1968–2025), Norwegian photographer, director and lecturer
- Carl Petter Opsahl (born 1964), Norwegian priest, jazz musician and journalist
- Haakon Opsahl (1905–2001), Norwegian and Canadian chess player
- Johan Opsahl (1866–1933), Norwegian politician
- Morten Opsahl (born 1955), Norwegian sprint canoer
- Sakarias Opsahl (born 1999), Norwegian footballer
- Torkel Opsahl (1931–1993), Norwegian human rights scholar
