= Kesten =

Kesten is a municipality in Germany.

Kesten may refer to:

== People ==
- Dieter Kesten, a German military officer
- Harry Kesten (1931–2019), American mathematician
- Hermann Kesten (1900–1996), German novelist, after whom the Hermann Kesten Medal is named
- Stefan Kesten (1888–1953), French chess player

== See also ==
- Kesten Point
