= Zografakis =

Zografakis (Greek: Ζωγραφάκης) is a Greek surname, which may refer to:

- Aristides Zografakis (1912–unknown), Greek chess player
- Dimitrios Zografakis (born 1978), Greek footballer
- Kimonas Zografakis (1918–2004), Greek partisan
