= Jos Gobert =

Belgian chess player

Personal information
- Born: 17 May 1922
- Died: unknown

Chess career
- Country: Belgium

Jos Gobert (also Jozef Gobert; 22 May 1922 – unknown) was a Belgian chess player, two times Belgian Chess Championships winner (1954, 1955).

== Biography ==
Jos Gobert was one of Belgium's leading chess players in the mid-1950s. He participated several times in Belgian Chess Championships and two times won this tournament. In 1954, in Bruges his victory was big surprise because he was ahead of the best Belgian chess players of this time - Albéric O'Kelly de Galway and Arthur Dunkelblum. The next year, in Merksem, Belgian Chess Championship was more haunted, but Jos Gobert shared 1st -3rd place and won an additional tournament for the title of champion.

Jos Gobert played for Belgium in the Chess Olympiad:

- In 1954, at third board in the 11th Chess Olympiad in Amsterdam (+1, =3, -4).

Jos Gobert played for Belgium in the Clare Benedict Cup:

- In 1953, at fifth board in the 1st Clare Benedict Chess Cup in Mont Pèlerin (+1, =1, -3).
