= Arthur Dunkelblum =

Polish-born Belgian chess player (1906–1979)

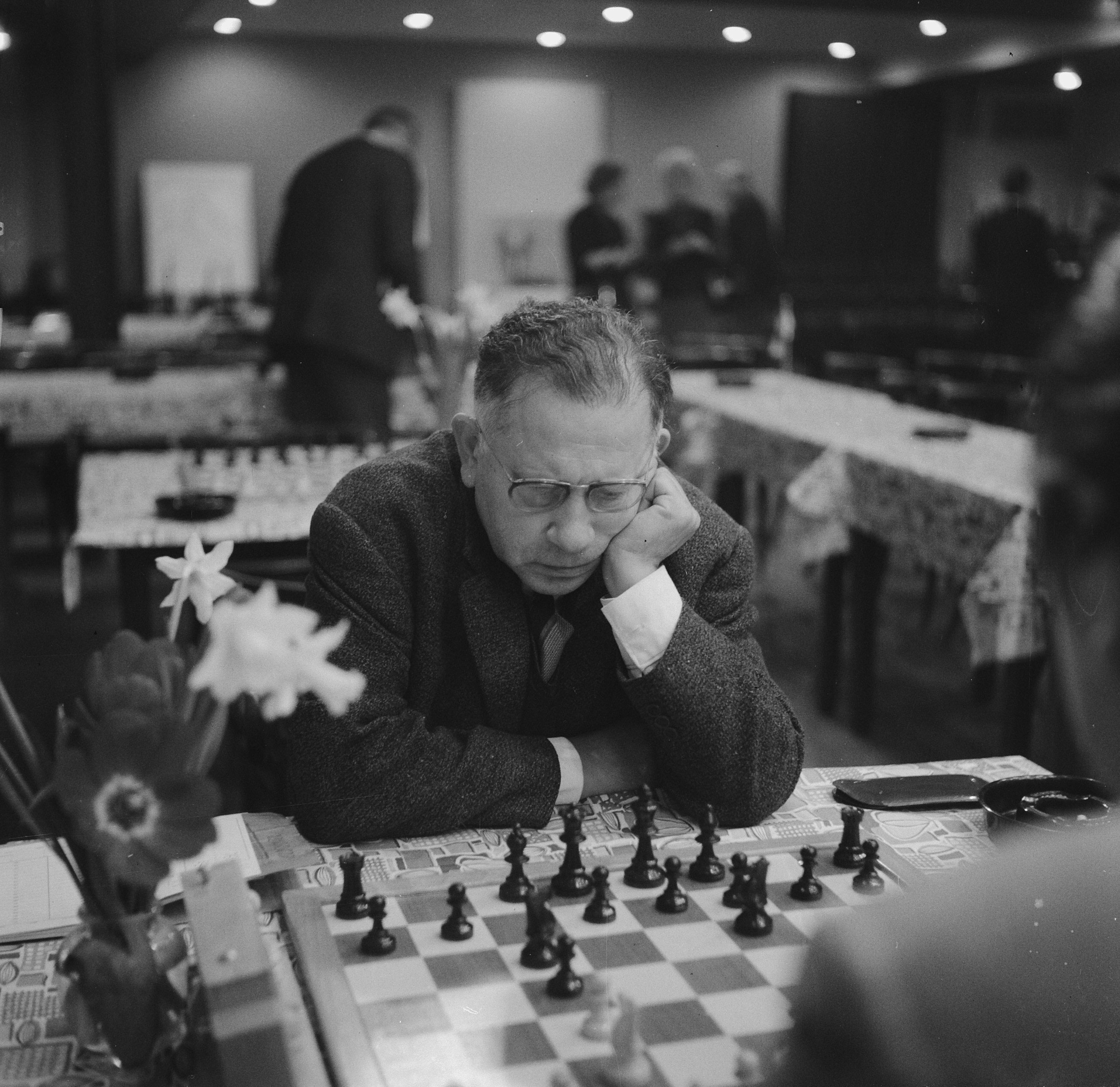
Arthur Dunkelblum, Beverwijk 1964

Arthur Dunkelblum (23 April 1906 – 27 January 1979) was a Polish-born Belgian chess master.

Arthur Dunkelblum was born in Podgórze (currently part of Kraków), Austria-Hungary. He played for Belgium in eleven Chess Olympiads: 1928, 1933, 1937, 1950, 1954, 1956, 1958, 1960, 1962, 1966, and 1968 (one of the biggest gap between first and last appearance at the Olympiads).

In 1922, he took 3rd in Antwerp (BEL-ch, Edgar Colle won). In 1925, he took 3rd in Brussels (BEL-ch, qualify.). In 1926, he tied for 5-7th in Spa. In 1930, he tied for 2nd-3rd in Brussels (George Koltanowski won). In 1933, he took 3rd in Brussels (BEL-ch). In 1934, he took 3rd in Liège (BEL-ch, Victor Soultanbeieff won). In 1937, he took 9th in Ostend. In 1937, he took 3rd in Brussels (BEL-ch).

After World War II, he tied for 5-6th in Baarn C (Baruch Harold Wood won) in 1947. Dunkelblum won the Belgium Championship at Bruges 1949. He tied for 2nd-3rd, behind Robert Lemaire, in Ghent (BEL-ch) in 1950. His best tournament result was at Gijón, Spain, in 1950 where he finished 2nd-3rd, behind Nicolas Rossolimo. In 1957, he tied for 10-11th in Dublin (zt, Luděk Pachman won).

Dunkelblum was awarded the International Master title in 1957.

== See also ==
- List of Jewish chess players
