= Georges Pierre Thibaut =

Belgian chess player (1920–2018)

Personal information
- Born: 25 November 1920
- Died: November 10, 2018 (aged 97) Dinant, Belgium

Chess career
- Country: Belgium

Georges Pierre Joseph Thibaut (25 November 1920 – 10 November 2018) was a Belgian chess player, Belgian Chess Championship medalist (1951, 1952, 1953).

== Biography ==
Georges Pierre Thibaut was one of Belgium's leading chess players form the end of 1940s to the early 1960s. He participated in all the Belgian Chess Championships from 1948 up to 1961. Georges Pierre Thibaut won in this tournaments three bronze medal in row: in 1951, 1952, and in 1953.

Georges Pierre Thibaut played for Belgium in the Chess Olympiads:

- In 1950, at fourth board in the 9th Chess Olympiad in Dubrovnik (+5, =4, -5),
- In 1954, at second reserve board in the 11th Chess Olympiad in Amsterdam (+2, =4, -4),
- In 1956, at fourth board in the 12th Chess Olympiad in Moscow (+4, =4, -5),
- In 1960, at second board in the 14th Chess Olympiad in Leipzig (+2, =7, -5).

In 1961, after a traffic accident, he stopped participating in chess tournaments.
