= Soini Helle =

Finnish chess player

Personal information
- Born: 15 April 1914 Jokioinen, Finland
- Died: 1992 (aged 77–78)

Chess career
- Country: Finland

Soini Helle (15 April 1914 – 1992) was a Finnish chess player.

In the early 1950s Soini Helle was one of Finland's leading chess players. He played mainly in domestic chess tournaments and Finnish Chess Championships.

Soini Helle played for Finland in the Chess Olympiad:

- In 1950, at first reserve board in the 9th Chess Olympiad in Dubrovnik (+0, =9, -1).
