= World Amateur Chess Championship =

Tournament organised by FIDE

The World Amateur Chess Championship is a tournament organised by FIDE and Amateur Chess Organisation (ACO).

The world governing body intended to promote amateur chess play by holding championship tournaments linked to the Olympic Games, but only two events were held. Since 1996, it has been an annual FIDE event.

== History ==
The first championship was held the year that FIDE was founded, at the 1924 Summer Olympics in Paris. This is considered the unofficial first Chess Olympiad, and is the only Olympiad that was an individual event. The second championship was held at the 1928 Summer Olympics in The Hague, in conjunction with the 2nd Chess Olympiad.

Chess has never been an official part of the Olympic Games, and since the chess community does not make any essential distinction between amateur and professional the championship was discontinued after 1928. However, in 1995 FIDE has revamped it to celebrate the centenary of the Hastings International Chess Congress and since then it has been held annually. The first renewed edition, held concurrently with the 1995/96 Hastings Congress from 28 December 1995 to 5 January 1996, was restricted to non-FIDE rated players. Subsequently, amateur was defined as a player with a FIDE rating below 2000 and not having attained a rating of more than 2000 in the past 2 years. Since 2016, the championship has been split into three rating categories: U-2300, U-2000 and U-1700. Additionally to these rating limits, a player must not hold the title of International Master or higher (or Woman International Master for women) for U-2300 and U-2000 section or the title of FIDE Master (or Woman FIDE Master for women); however, players that are 65 years or older are exempt from this additional requirement to qualify.

According to the current FIDE regulations, the winners of the U-2300 and the U-2000 sections are awarded with the title of FIDE Master (FM), while the winner of the U-1700 category, the runner-ups and bronze medallists of the U-2300 and the U-2000 categories receive the Candidate Master (CM) title. Analogously the women's champions in the U-2300 and U-2000 categories receive the title of Woman FIDE Master (WFM), the winner of women's U1700 category, the silver and bronze medallists in the women's U-2300 and U-2000 categories are granted the title Woman Candidate Master (WCM).

Since 2012, there is another World Amateur Chess Championship, organised by the Amateur Chess Organisation (ACO), which is not recognised by FIDE.

== Winners ==
Year	Dates	Host	Winner(s)	Women's champion(s)
1924	4 May – 27 Jul	Paris	(Latvia) Hermanis Matisons	
1928	17 May – 12 Aug	Amsterdam	(Netherlands) Max Euwe	
1996	28 Dec – 5 Jan	Hastings	(England) Brian Johnson	
1997	28 Dec – 5 Jan	Hastings	(Estonia) Olev Schults	(France) Catherine Dewitte
1998	29 Dec – 11 Jan	Hastings	(India) Viraf Avari	(England) Rosalind Kieran
1999	29 Dec – 10 Jan	Hastings	(Armenia) Gaguik Oganessian	(England) Jessie Gilbert
2000	29 Dec – 6 Jan	Hastings	(Germany) Sven Mühlenhaus	(Scotland) Elaine Rutherford
2001	27 Dec – 8 Jan	Pamplona	(Colombia) Bismarck Nicolás Chaverra Rojas	(Spain) Maria Goni
2001	6–13 Dec	Bento Gonçalves	(Brazil) Flávio Olivência	(Canada) Amanda Benggawan
2002	13–19 Dec	Bento Gonçalves	(Brazil) Juliano Resende Pereira	(Brazil) Thalita Cincinato
2003	2–13 Jul	Tshwane	(South Africa) Shabier Bhawoodien	(South Africa) Daleen Wiid
2004	30 Jun – 10 Jul	Cape Town	(Zimbabwe) Farai Mandizha	Jenine Ellappen
2005	31 Jul – 12 Aug	Piešťany	Cancelled	
2006	23 Nov – 3 Dec	Tripoli	(Morocco) Rachid Hifad	(Sri Lanka) Nirmala Chandrasiri
2007	11–18 Aug	Predeal	(Romania) Alexandru Gabriel Duca	(Romania) Eugenia-Daniela Ghita
2008	28 Apr – 6 May	Chalkidiki	(Greece) Panagiotis Galopoulos	(India) Mitali Patil
2009	27 Apr – 3 May	Thessaloniki	(Romania) Stefan Parlog	(Greece) Efstathia Andrikopoulou
2010	19–25 Mar	Skokie	(United States) Andrew Hubbard	(United States) Yun Fan
2011	1–10 Oct	Antalya	(Mongolia) Bilgunn Sumiya	(Mongolia) Bayar Anu
2012	16–22 Apr	Chalkidiki	(Greece) Haralambos Tsakiris	(Colombia) Laura Perez
2013	21–30 Apr	Iași	(Romania) Lehel Vrencian	(Mongolia) Bayarsaikhan Yanjinlkham
2014	26 Apr – 3 May	Singapore	(Mongolia) Gijir Munkhbayar	(India) Chitlange Sakshi
2015	14–21 Apr	Chalkidiki	(Turkey) Mire Deniz Doğan	(Moldova) Paula-Alexandra Gitu
2016	18–28 Apr	Chalkidiki	(Kazakhstan) Zhuban Bigabylov (U2300) (Mongolia) Khulan Enkhsaikhan (U2000) (India) Jatin S.N. (U1700)	(Greece) Georgia Grapsa (U2300) (Mongolia) Khulan Enkhsaikhan (U2000) (Russia) Diana Zakharova (U1700)
2017	1–9 Apr	Spoleto	(Myanmar) Win Tun (U2300) (Poland) Maciej Koziej (U2000) (England) Hope Mkhumba (U1700)	(Mongolia) Bayarjargal Bayarmaa (U2300) (Sri Lanka) Zainab Saumy (U2000) (Russia) Vilena Popova (U1700)
2018	22–29 Apr	Cagliari	(India) Arvinder Preet Singh (U2300) (Azerbaijan) Kanan Hajiyev (U2000) (Turkey) Batuhan Sutbas (U1700)	(Mongolia) Bayarjargal Bayarmaa (U2300) (Russia) Elisaveta Chetina (U2000) (Russia) Vilena Popova (U1700)
2019	29 Jun – 7 Jul	Colima	(Peru) Elías Renzo Gutiérrez Medina (U2300); Jesús Amezcua Luría (U2000) (Mongolia) Dashtogtokh Amarsaikhan (U1700)	(Russia) Alexandra Zherebtsova (U2300) (Mongolia) Batnasan Khaliun (U2000) (United States) Omya Vidyarthi (U1700)
2020	2–12 Apr	Heraklion	Postponed to 2021	
2021	16–26 Oct	Rhodes	(Greece) Dimitrios Ladopoulos (U2300) (India) Peter Anand (U2000) (Kazakhstan) Mukhtar Ainakul (U1700)	(Russia) Alexandra Zherebtsova (U2300) (Belgium) Marigje Degrande (U2000) (Kenya) Glenda Madelta (U1700)
2022	20–30 Oct	Mellieħa	(Kazakhstan) Abdilkhair Abilmansur (U2300) (Mongolia) Sodbilegt Naranbold (U2000) (Mongolia) Tuguldur Soninbayar (U1700)	(England) Grigoryan Meri (U2300) (Lithuania) Baliuniene Margarita (U2000) (Mongolia) Margadgua Erdenebayar (U1700)
2023	2–11 Nov	Muscat	(Kazakhstan) Abdilkhair Abilmansur (U2300) (Mongolia) Dashtogtokh Amarsaikhan (U2000) (Mongolia) Ganbat Danzanjunai K (U1700)	(Kazakhstan) Bauyrzhan Amash (U2300) (Mongolia) Norovsambuu Badamkhand (U2000) (Mongolia) Bat-Amgalan Anujin (U1700)
2024	26 Oct – 5 Nov	Rhodes	(Poland) Tomasz Zebracki (U2300) (Kazakhstan) Nurasyl Zhumabek (U2000) (Morocco) Yassine Rafik (U1700)	(Mongolia) Amin-Erdene B (U2300) (Mongolia) Saikhanchimeg T (U2000) (Ukraine) Anastasiia Osadchuk (U1700)
2025	4–14 Nov	Vrnjacka Banja	(FIDE) Ivan Kudrin (U2300) (Serbia) Dejan Jakovljević (U2000) (Kyrgyzstan) Medet Dyahaparov (U1700)	(Mongolia) Tsogtsaikhan Saikhanchimeg (U2300) (Mongolia) Khuslenzaya Baldanjantsan (U2000) (United Arab Emirates) Mouza Nasser Alshamsi (U1700)
2026	5–12 Nov	Klang	(Kazakhstan) Amir Tulegenov (U2300) (Malaysia) Aqil Ainuddin (U2000) (Mongolia) Bayarjargal Javkhlan (U1700)	(India) R V Pavithra (U2300) (Ukraine) Anastasiia Osadchuk (U2000) (Mongolia) Lhagvasuren Dolgormaa (U1700)

== See also ==
- 1st unofficial Chess Olympiad (Paris 1924)
- 2nd Chess Olympiad (The Hague 1928)
