= Moises Aron Kupferstich =

Danish chess player

Personal information
- Born: 14 November 1905 Lublin, Poland
- Died: 18 May 1984 (aged 78) Copenhagen, Denmark

Chess career
- Country: Denmark

Moises Aron Kupferstich (14 November 1905 – 18 May 1984) was a Poland-born Danish chess player and Danish Chess Championship medalist (1953, 1954).

From the late 1940s to the late 1950s, Moises Aron Kupferstich was one of the leading Danish chess players. He won two bronze medals in Danish Chess Championships (1953, 1954).

Moises Aron Kupferstich played for Denmark in the Chess Olympiad:

- In 1950, at fourth board in the 9th Chess Olympiad in Dubrovnik (+3, =5, -4).
