= Reino Niemi =

Finnish chess player

Personal information
- Born: January 23, 1914
- Died: 1966

Chess career
- Country: Finland

Reino Niemi (23 January 1914 – 1966) was a Finnish chess player and Finnish Chess Championship medalist (1938, 1945).

== Biography ==
From the late 1930s to the early 1950s, Reino Niemi was one of Finland's leading chess players. In Finnish Chess Championships, he won two silver medals (1938, 1945).

Reino Niemi played for Finland in the Chess Olympiad:

- In 1950, at third board in the 9th Chess Olympiad in Dubrovnik (+0, =3, -4).
