= Alexandre Dgebuadze =

Georgian-Belgian chess grandmaster (born 1971)

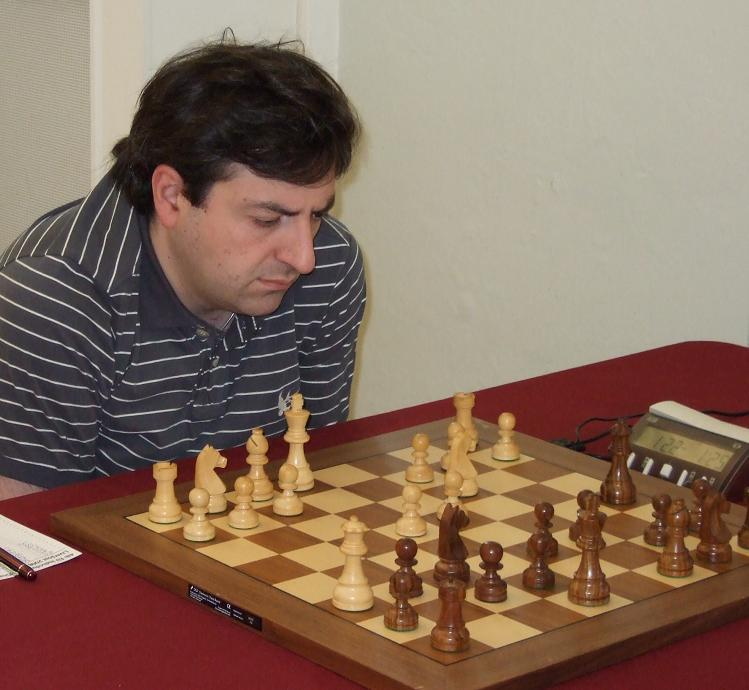

Personal information
- Born: 21 May 1971 (age 55)

Chess career
- Country: Soviet Union (until 1991); Georgia (1992–2000); Belgium (since 2000)
- Title: Grandmaster (2000)
- FIDE rating: 2422 (October 2026)
- Peak rating: 2563 (July 2012)

Alexandre Dgebuadze (born 21 May 1971) is a Georgian-born Belgian chess player who played for Georgia until 2000. He was awarded the title of Grandmaster by FIDE in 2000.

== Chess career ==
He has won the Georgian Chess Championship in 1990, and the Belgian Chess Championship four times; in 2002, 2005, 2007 and 2020.

He earned the Belgian federation spot to qualify for the Chess World Cup 2021, where he was defeated by Kiril Georgiev in the first round.
