= Paul Limbos =

Belgian chess player

Personal information
- Born: 6 July 1914
- Died: 1987 (aged 72–73)

Chess career
- Country: Belgium

Paul Limbos (6 July 1914 – 1987) was a Belgian chess player and Belgian Chess Championship winner (1961, 1963).

== Biography ==
From the end of 1950s to the mid-1960s Paul Limbos was one of Belgium's leading chess players. He twice won Belgian Chess Championships: in 1961 and 1963.

Paul Limbos played for Belgium in the Chess Olympiads:

- In 1956, at third board in the 12th Chess Olympiad in Moscow (+2, =12, -4),
- In 1962, at third board in the 15th Chess Olympiad in Varna (+2, =9, -5).

Paul Limbos played for Belgium in the European Team Chess Championship preliminaries:

- In 1970, at second board in the 4th European Team Chess Championship preliminaries (+0, =2, -1).

Paul Limbos played for Belgium in the Clare Benedict Chess Cup:

- In 1955, at fourth board in the 2nd Clare Benedict Chess Cup in Mont Pèlerin (+0, =4, -0).
