= Bart Michiels =

Belgian chess grandmaster (born 1986)

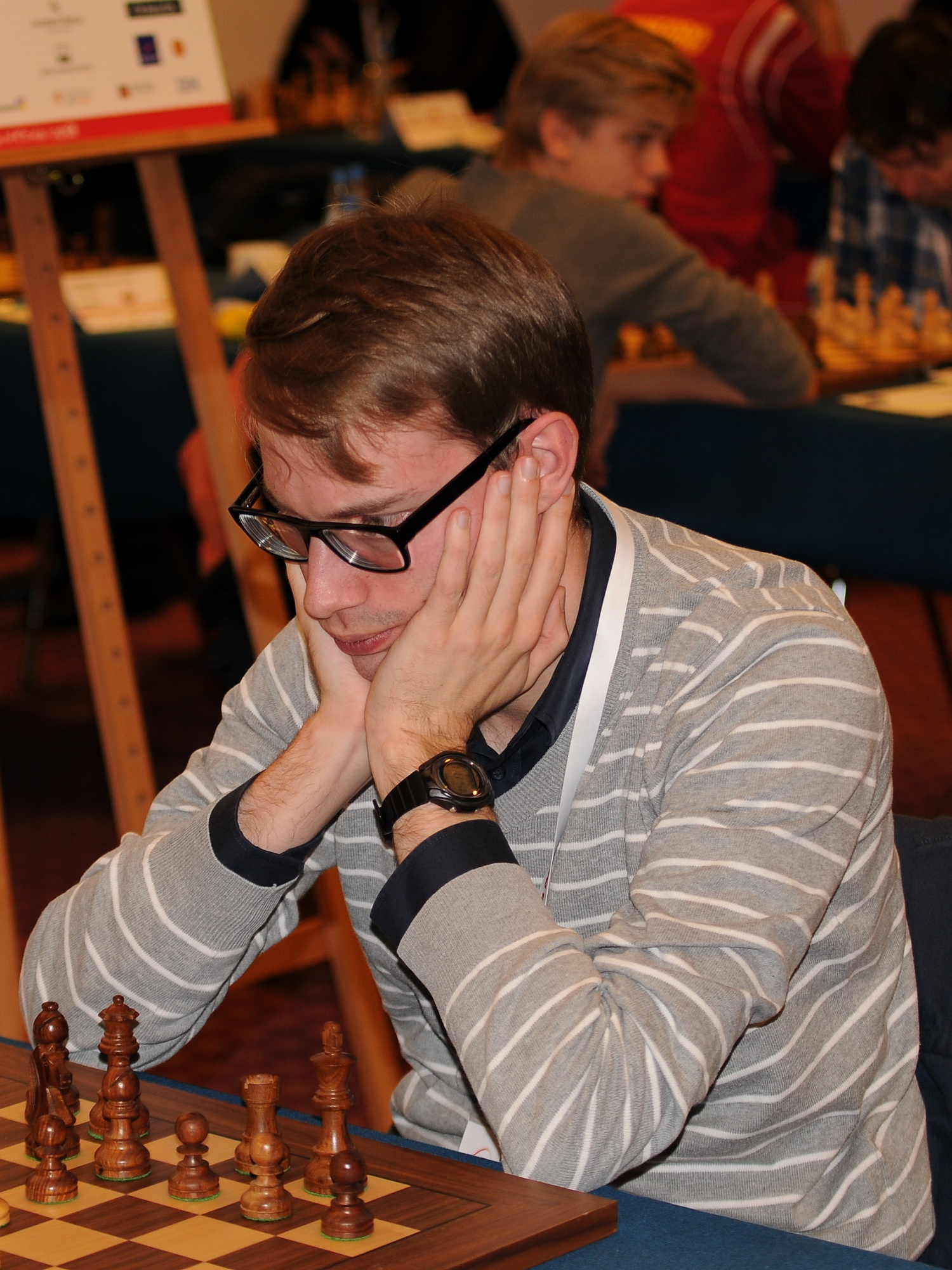
- Michiels in 2013

Personal information
- Born: 30 October 1986 (age 39) Ghent, Belgium

Chess career
- Country: Belgium
- Title: Grandmaster (2014)
- FIDE rating: 2547 (July 2026)
- Peak rating: 2572 (January 2020)

Bart Michiels (born 30 October 1986) is a Belgian chess grandmaster.

== Chess career ==
Michiels won the Belgian Chess Championship in 2004 and 2011.

He represented Belgium at the Chess Olympiads in 2010, 2012, and 2014.

He played in the 2015 French Team Championships.

In 2015, Michiels played in the Challengers section of the Tata Steel Chess Tournament, where he achieved wins against Samuel Sevian, Anne Haast, and Ari Dale.
