= Hans Busek =

Austrian chess player

Personal information
- Born: 11 March 1916
- Died: unknown

Chess career
- Country: Austria

Hans Busek (11 March 1916 – unknown) was an Austrian chess player, Austrian Chess Championship bronze medalist (1954, 1955).

== Biography ==
In the 1950s and 1960s Hans Busek was one of the leading chess players in Austria. He twice in row won bronze medals in Austrian Chess Championship (1954, 1955).

Hans Busek played for Austria in the Chess Olympiads:

- In 1950, at second board in the 9th Chess Olympiad in Dubrovnik (+2, =6, -2),
- In 1956, at second reserve board in the 12th Chess Olympiad in Moscow (+1, =3, -1).

Hans Busek played for Austria in the European Team Chess Championship preliminaries:

- In 1957, at fifth board in the 1st European Team Chess Championship preliminaries (+1, =1, -2),
- In 1961, at sixth board in the 2nd European Team Chess Championship preliminaries (+2, =1, -2),
- In 1965, at second reserve in the 3rd European Team Chess Championship preliminaries (+0, =2, -2).
