= Sture Lindquist =

Swedish chess player

Personal information
- Born: 10 November 1910
- Died: 1978

Chess career
- Country: Sweden

Sture Lindquist (10 November 1910 – 1978) was a Swedish chess player.

== Biography ==
Sture Lindquist was one of Sweden's strongest chess players from the 1930s to the 1950s. Participant of the official and unofficial Swedish Chess Championships.

Sture Lindquist played for Sweden in the Chess Olympiad:

- In 1950, at first reserve board in the 9th Chess Olympiad in Dubrovnik (+1, =2, -2).
