= Alfred Beni =

Austrian chess player

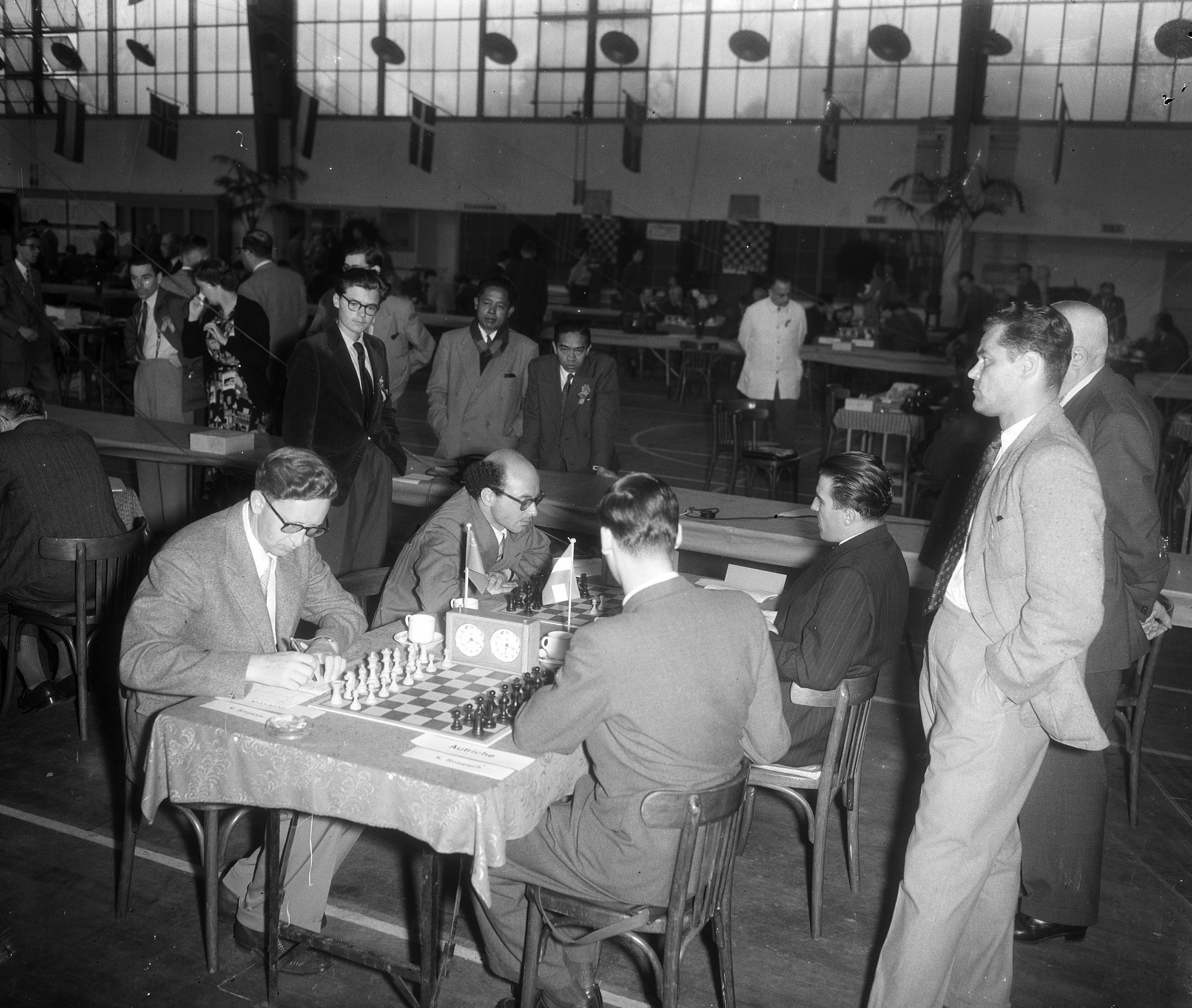
- Beni (dark suit, right side of the table) vs. David Bronstein (1954)

Personal information
- Born: 3 June 1923
- Died: 4 June 1995 (aged 72)

Chess career
- Country: Austria
- Title: International Master (1951)

Alfred Beni (3 June 1923 — 4 June 1995) was an Austrian chess International Master (IM) (1951).

== Biography ==
Alfred Beni was two-time silver medalist Austrian Chess Championship (1947, 1952). In 1957, he represented Austria in the Zonal Chess tournament. Alfred Beni consisted of Vienna chess clubs: Schachklub Sandleiten (until 1941), Schachklub Hietzing Wien (1941-1945 and 1948–1977), Schachklub Ing. Georg Weisel (1945–1948), Schachklub Donaustadt (1977–1995; including as president).

Alfred Beni played for Austria in the Chess Olympiads:

- In 1950, at first board in the 9th Chess Olympiad in Dubrovnik (+5, =9, -1),
- In 1952, at third board in the 10th Chess Olympiad in Helsinki (+5, =4, -4),
- In 1954, at second board in the 11th Chess Olympiad in Amsterdam (+8, =5, -3),
- In 1958, at fourth board in the 13th Chess Olympiad in Munich (+6, =5, -5),
- In 1960, at second board in the 14th Chess Olympiad in Leipzig (+5, =9, -4),
- In 1962, at third board in the 15th Chess Olympiad in Varna (+4, =6, -6),
- In 1964, at second board in the 16th Chess Olympiad in Tel Aviv (+2, =8, -5).

Alfred Beni played for Austria in the European Team Chess Championship preliminaries:

- In 1957, at third board in the 1st European Team Chess Championship preliminaries (+0, =2, -2),
- In 1961, at second board in the 2nd European Team Chess Championship preliminaries (+0, =1, -4),
- In 1965, at first board in the 3rd European Team Chess Championship preliminaries (+1, =1, -2).

Also Alfred Beni five time participated in Clare Benedict Chess Cup (1953, 1959–1960, 1963–1964) and in team competition won two bronze (1959, 1964) medals.
