= Louise Loeffler =

Belgian chess player

Personal information
- Born: unknown
- Died: unknown

Chess career
- Country: Belgium

Louise-Jeanne Loeffler (unknown – unknown) was a Belgian chess player, Belgian Women's Chess Championship sixth-times winner.

== Biography ==
From the mid-1950s to the mid-1960s, Louise Loeffler was one of the leading chess players in the Belgium. Sixth times she won the Belgian Women's Chess Championships: 1954, 1958, 1959, 1960, 1961 and 1967.

Louise Loeffler played for Belgium in the Women's Chess Olympiads:

- In 1963, at first board in the 2nd Chess Olympiad (women) in Split (+1, =0, -13),
- In 1969, at second board in the 4th Chess Olympiad (women) in Lublin (+2, =1, -11).
