= Mher Hovhannisyan =

Armenian-Belgian chess grandmaster (born 1978)

Personal information
- Born: September 25, 1978 (age 47) Gyumri, Armenia

Chess career
- Country: Armenia (until 2014); Belgium (since 2014)
- Title: Grandmaster (2018)
- Peak rating: 2536 (September 2014)

Mher Hovhannisyan is an Armenian-Belgian chess grandmaster.

== Chess career ==
He has won the Belgian Chess Championship five times: in 2009, 2010, 2015, 2017, and 2018.

In May 2013, he tied for first place with Vladimir Dobrov, Sipke Ernst, David Miedema, and Daniel Hausrath in the Limburg Festival. He ultimately finished second due to tiebreaks.

In August 2014, he won the Charleroi Open with a score of 7.5/9, finishing ahead of 226 participants.

In July 2022, he served as the captain of the Belgian Olympiad team.

In July 2024, he finished in third place at the Belgian Chess Championship, losing to winner Daniel Dardha and runner-up Stefan Beukema.
