= Jozef Boey =

Belgian chess player (1934–2016)

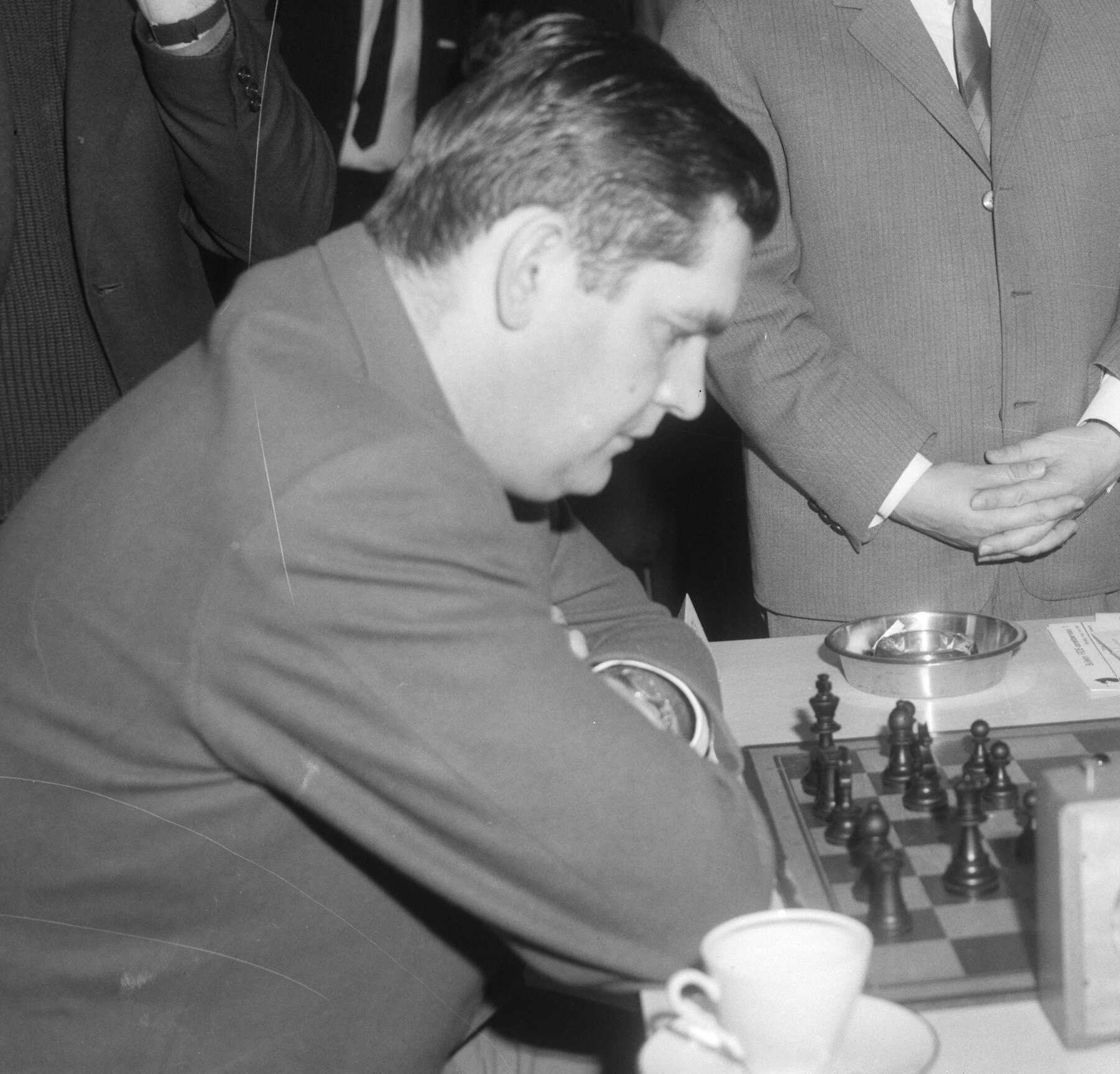
- Boey in 1966

Personal information
- Full name: Jozef Martin Boey
- Born: 16 May 1934 Antwerp, Belgium
- Died: 28 February 2016 (aged 81) Vosselaar, Belgium

Chess career
- Country: Belgium
- Title: FIDE International Master (1973); ICCF Grandmaster (1975)
- Peak rating: 2435 (July 1973)

Jozef Martin Boey (also spelled Josef, 16 May 1934 – 28 February 2016) was a Belgian chess player who held the FIDE title of International Master (IM, 1973) and the ICCF title of Correspondence Chess Grandmaster (GM, 1975). He was a four-time Belgian Chess Championship winner (1959, 1964, 1965, 1971).

== Biography ==
From the mid-1950s to the mid-1970s Jozef Boey was one of Belgium's leading chess players. He four times won Belgian Chess Championships: in 1959 (together with Albéric O'Kelly de Galway), 1964, 1965, 1971 (together with Roeland Verstraeten). Jozef Boey twice played in World Chess Championship European Zonal Tournaments: in 1963, in Enschede he ranked 12th place, but in 1966, in The Hague he shared 11th–12th place. He has had several successes in international chess tournaments, include shared 2nd place in Amsterdam (1974, IBM international chess tournament B) and shared 2nd place in Roosendaal (1983).

Boey played for Belgium in the Chess Olympiads:

- In 1956, at first reserve board in the 12th Chess Olympiad in Moscow (+3, =5, -3),
- In 1962, at fourth board in the 15th Chess Olympiad in Varna (+6, =7, -5),
- In 1966, at second board in the 17th Chess Olympiad in Havana (+2, =11, -4),
- In 1968, at second board in the 18th Chess Olympiad in Lugano (+5, =5, -5),
- In 1970, at first board in the 19th Chess Olympiad in Siegen (+4, =11, -0),
- In 1972, at first board in the 20th Chess Olympiad in Skopje (+5, =5, -2),
- In 1974, at first board in the 21st Chess Olympiad in Nice (+6, =6, -4),
- In 1988, at third board in the 28th Chess Olympiad in Thessaloniki (+2, =3, -4).

Boey played for Belgium in the European Team Chess Championship preliminaries:

- In 1973, at first board in the 5th European Team Chess Championship preliminaries (+0, =1, -1).

In the 1970s Boey devoted himself to the correspondence chess, in which he achieved significant results, being one of the world's leaders in the mid-1980s. Boey participated three times in the World Correspondence Chess Championship finals. The greatest his success was in the 7th final (1972-1976), in which he ranked 2nd place. In the other two finals he took 12th place (1975–1980, 8th final) and 7th place (1978–1984, 10th final).

Boey was a chemist by profession.
