= Alfons Franck =

Belgian chess player

- Born: 30 October 1907; Antwerpen
- Died: May 1989 (aged 81); Antwerpen
- Spouses: Margareta Mahner

Alfons Franck (1907 – 1989) was a Belgian chess player, Belgian Chess Championships winner (1958).

== Biography ==
From the end of 1930s to end of 1950s Alfons Franck was one of Belgium's leading chess players. He was a multiple participant of the Belgian Chess Championship. In 1958, in Blankenberge Alfons Franck won this tournament.

Alfons Franck played for Belgium in the Chess Olympiads:

- In 1954, at first reserve board in the 11th Chess Olympiad in Amsterdam (+0, =2, -4),
- In 1958, at second board in the 13th Chess Olympiad in Munich (+0, =5, -11),
- In 1960, at first reserve board in the 14th Chess Olympiad in Leipzig (+4, =2, -5).
