= Elisabeth Cuypers =

Belgian chess player

Personal information
- Born: unknown
- Died: unknown

Chess career
- Country: Belgium

Elisabeth Cuypers (unknown – unknown) was a Belgian chess player, Belgian Women's Chess Championship four-times winner.

== Biography ==
From the early 1940s to the end of 1960s, Elisabeth Cuypers was one of the leading chess players in the Belgium. Four times she won the Belgian Women's Chess Championships: 1941, 1943, 1945 and 1968. Also Elisabeth Cuypers won silver (1951) un bronze (1962) medals in this tournament.

Elisabeth Cuypers played for Belgium in the Women's Chess Olympiads:

- In 1957, at first board in the 1st Chess Olympiad (women) in Emmen (+1, =0, -10),
- In 1963, at second board in the 2nd Chess Olympiad (women) in Split (+2, =1, -5).
