= Mario Zapata Vinces =

Peruvian chess player (1920–??)

Personal information
- Born: 29 April 1920
- Died: unknown

Chess career
- Country: Peru

Mario Zapata Vinces (29 April 1920 – unknown) was a Peruvian chess player.

== Biography ==
To the 1950s Mario Zapata Vinces was one of the leading Peruvian chess players. He was participant and medalist the Peruvian Chess Championships. In 1959, he shared 12th - 14th place in International Chess Tournament in Lima (tournament won Borislav Ivkov and Luděk Pachman).

Mario Zapata Vinces played for Peru in the Chess Olympiad:

- In 1950, at third board in the 9th Chess Olympiad in Dubrovnik (+4, =7, -4).
