= Hanne Goossens =

Belgian chess player (born 1992)

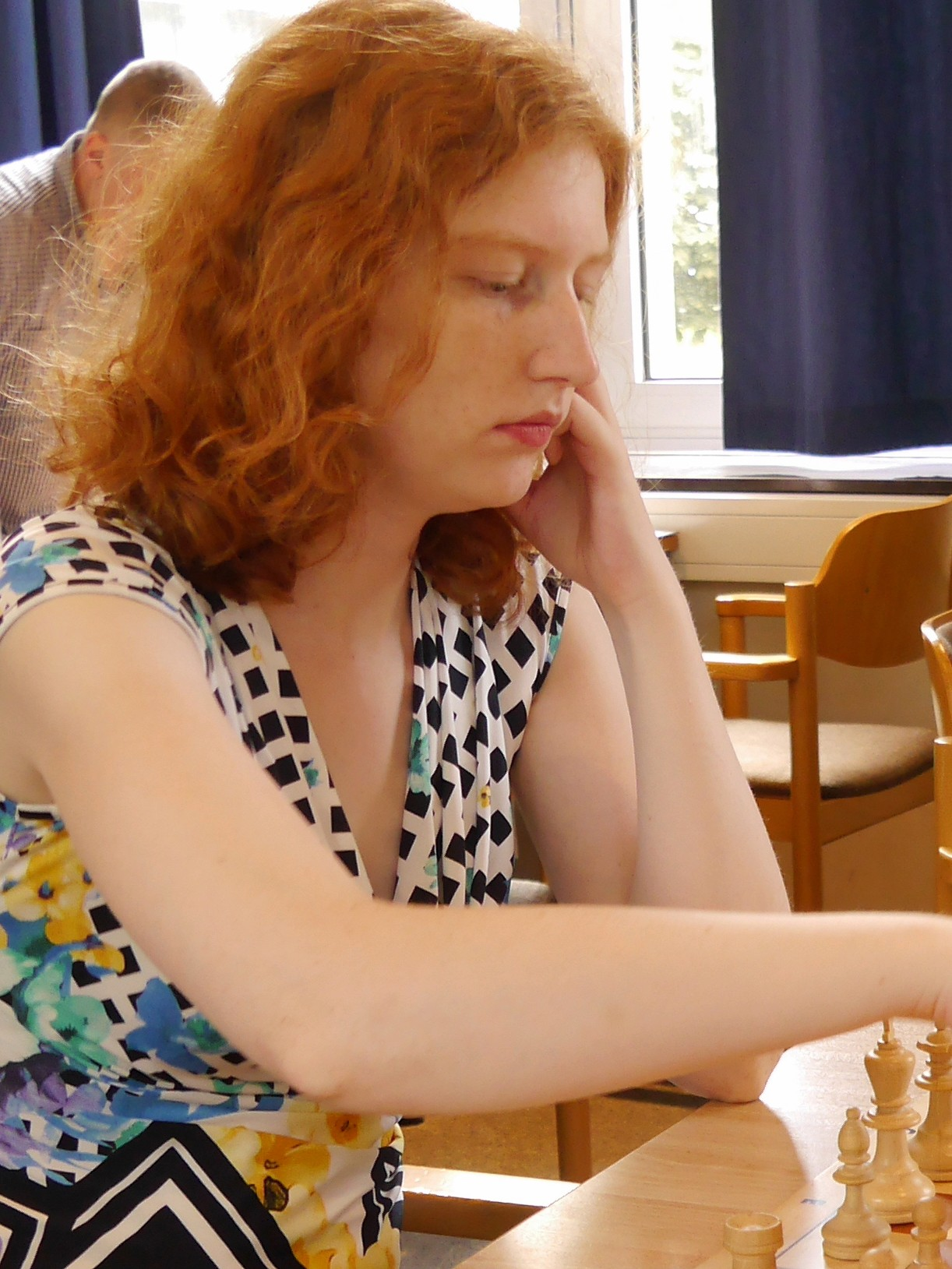
- Goossens in 2017

Personal information
- Born: October 9, 1992 (age 33) Leuven, Belgium

Chess career
- Country: Belgium
- Title: Woman International Master (2018)
- Peak rating: 2248 (August 2026)

Hanne Goossens is a Belgian chess player.

== Chess career ==
Goossens is a five-time Belgian Women's Chess Champion, winning in 2009, 2015, 2016, 2018, and 2026. In the 2026 championship, she won with a perfect score of 9/9, finishing ahead of runner-up Diana Musabayeva by 1.5 points.

She played for Belgium in the:

- 40th Chess Olympiad on board 3, scoring 6.5/10.
- 41st Chess Olympiad on board 1, scoring 6.5/11.
- 46th Chess Olympiad on board 1, scoring 5/10.
