= Harras Heikinheimo =

Finnish chess player

Personal information
- Born: 21 September 1914
- Died: 1 March 1999 (aged 84)

Chess career
- Country: Finland

Harras Heikinheimo (21 September 1914 – 1 March 1999) was a Finnish chess player.

== Biography ==
In the early 1950s Harras Heikinheimo was one of Finland's leading chess players. He played mainly in domestic chess tournaments and Finnish Chess Championships.

Harras Heikinheimo played for Finland in the Chess Olympiad:

- In 1950, at second reserve board in the 9th Chess Olympiad in Dubrovnik (+3, =1, -2).
