= Giuseppe Primavera =

Italian chess player

Personal information
- Born: 30 October 1917 Prato Carnico, Italy
- Died: 4 January 1998 (aged 80) Rome, Italy

Chess career
- Country: Italy

Giuseppe Primavera (Italian pronunciation: [dʒuˈzɛppe ˌprimaˈvɛːra] 30 October 1917 – 4 January 1998) was an Italian chess player, Italian Chess Championship medalist (1948, 1953, 1954, 1970).

== Biography ==
Giuseppe Primavera won four medals in Italian Chess Championships: two silver (1948 - after losing an additional match to Vincenzo Castaldi, 1970) and two bronze (1953, 1954) medals. He won the Italian Team Chess Championships six times: three times with the team of the Roman Academy of Chess (1959, 1971, 1973) and three times with the team of municipal employees of Rome (1963, 1964, 1966). In 1953, Giuseppe Primavera shared 1st-2nd place with Anthony Santasiere in the International Chess Tournament in Milan. He was a participant in strong international chess tournaments in Venice (1948, 1950).

Giuseppe Primavera played for Italy in the Chess Olympiads:

- In 1950, at reserve board in the 9th Chess Olympiad in Dubrovnik (+3, =4, -5),
- In 1952, at reserve board in the 10th Chess Olympiad in Helsinki (+3, =4, -6),
- In 1958, at first board in the 13th Chess Olympiad in Munich (+5, =6, -4),
- In 1968, at fourth board in the 18th Chess Olympiad in Lugano (+3, =3, -5),
- In 1970, at third board in the 19th Chess Olympiad in Siegen (+1, =5, -5).

Also Giuseppe Primavera played for Italy in the Clare Benedict Chess Cup (1973).

In 1973, Giuseppe Primavera was one of the founders of the organization AMIS (Association of Chess Masters of Italy). In 1973-1974 he published the chess magazine Tutto Schacchi.
