= Hartvig Nielsen =

Danish chess player (1908–1997)

Personal information
- Born: 1 April 1908
- Died: 31 January 1997

Chess career
- Country: Denmark

Hartvig Nielsen (1 April 1908 – 31 January 1997) was a Danish chess player and Danish Chess Championship medalist (1941).

== Biography ==
From the late 1930s to the late 1950s, Hartvig Nielsen was one of the leading Danish chess players. He won a silver medal in the Danish Chess Championships in 1941.

Hartvig Nielsen played for Denmark in the unofficial Chess Olympiad:

- In 1936, at second reserve board in the 3rd unofficial Chess Olympiad in Munich (+2, =0, -3).

Hartvig Nielsen played for Denmark in the Chess Olympiad:

- In 1950, at reserve board in the 9th Chess Olympiad in Dubrovnik (+3, =1, -6).
