= Karl Van Schoor =

Belgian chess player

Karl van Schoor
Personal information
- Born: 1930 Antwerpen
- Died: 2003 (aged 72–73) Lint

Chess career
- Country: Belgium

Karl van Schoor (1930 – 2003) was a Belgian chess player, Belgian Chess Championship winner (1970).

== Biography ==
Karl van Schoor was one of Belgium's leading chess players form the early 1950s to the early 1970s. In 1970, in Ghent he won Belgian Chess Championship.

Karl van Schoor played for Belgium in the Chess Olympiads:

- In 1950, at first reserve board in the 9th Chess Olympiad in Dubrovnik (+0, =0, -2),
- In 1958, at third board in the 13th Chess Olympiad in Munich (+3, =7, -6),
- In 1960, at fourth board in the 14th Chess Olympiad in Leipzig (+5, =7, -3),
- In 1970, at first reserve board in the 19th Chess Olympiad in Siegen (+2, =7, -3).
