= Hans Lambert =

Austrian chess player (1928–2020)

Personal information
- Born: 19 March 1928
- Died: 05 April 2020

Chess career
- Country: Austria

Hans Lambert (born 19 March 1928 – 5 April 2020) was an Austrian chess player, Chess Olympiad individual silver medal winner (1950).

== Biography ==
After World War II Hans Lambert was one of the leading Austrian chess players. In the 1948 Austrian Chess Championship he ranked 6th, but after the year shared 2nd -4th place, but due to a worse additional factor left 4th place. He participated in Austrian national team chess matches with Italy (1951), West Germany (1953) and Soviet Union (1953). In 1953, he successfully represented Vienna club Hietzing Wien in chess club tournaments and won the 2nd place in the Mitropa Cup.

Hans Lambert played for Austria in the Chess Olympiad:

- In 1950, at reserve board in the 9th Chess Olympiad in Dubrovnik (+6, =4, -2) and won individual silver medal.

Also, he played for Austria in the Clare Benedict Chess Cup (1953, 1965) where he won silver medal in team competition (1953) and won gold medal in individual competition (1953).

He participated in chess tournaments until the early 1980s.
