= Marianne Stoffels =

Belgian chess player

Personal information
- Born: ca. 1901

Chess career
- Country: Belgium

Marianne Stoffels (ca. 1901 – unknown) was a Belgian chess master. She was a Women's World Chess Championship participant in 1939 and a five-time winner the Belgian Women's Chess Championship (1938, 1939, 1940, 1942, 1944).

== Biography ==
From the late 1930s to the early 1940s, Stoffels was one of the leading female chess players in Belgium. She won the Belgian Women's Chess Championships five times: in 1938, 1939, 1940, 1942 and 1944. She participated several times in the Antwerp interclub tournament De Zilveren toren with the Antwerp chess club Het schaakbord from 1929 to 1934. In 1939, Stoffels participated in Women's World Chess Championship 1939 in Buenos Aires, where she finished in 16th place.
