= Hans-Hilmar Staudte =

German chess player

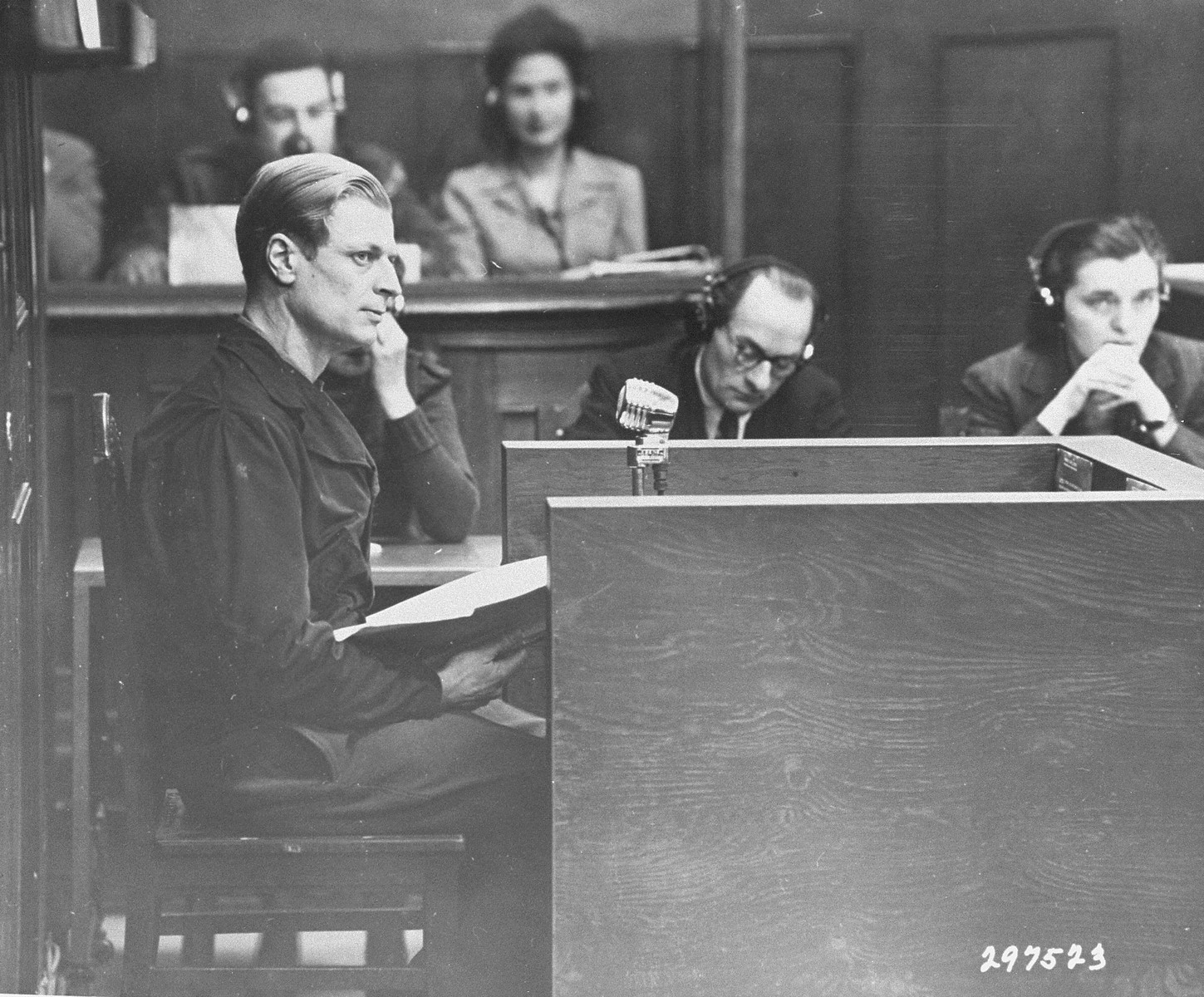
- Hans-Hilmar Staudte in Nuremberg trials in 1948

Personal information
- Born: January 18, 1911 Kaldenkirchen, German Empire
- Died: January 21, 1979 (aged 68) Münster, West Germany

Chess career
- Country: Germany

Hans-Hilmar Staudte (18 January 1911 – 21 January 1979) was a German jurist and chess player, Chess Olympiad team and individual bronze medals winner (1950).

== Biography ==
In 1940, Hans-Hilmar Staudte in University of Hamburg defended his doctorate in law. During the World War II he worked as a judge in Munich. After the war, Hans-Hilmar Staudte was in custody of allies. In 1948, he participated as a witness in Nuremberg trials. In the later years, Hans-Hilmar Staudte worked at the Federal Ministry of Finance in Bonn until he retired at the age of 65. He died after a long illness.

In 1925 he became a member of Aachen chess club. In 1935, Hans-Hilmar Staudte ranked 2nd in the Bas-Rhin Chess Federation Championship. In 1941, he won one of the Bavaria chess congresses second tournament. In 1950, in German Chess Championship Hans-Hilmar Staudte shared 2nd place with Efim Bogoljubov behind winner Wolfgang Unzicker. Hans-Hilmar Staudte played for West Germany in the Chess Olympiad:

- In 1950, at fourth board in the 9th Chess Olympiad in Dubrovnik (+6, =3, -3) and won team and individual bronze medals.

Due to his busy job, he finished his active chess career early.

From 1951 to 1961 Hans-Hilmar Staudte was secretary of the German Chess Federation. He seriously worked with chess composition. In 1962, Hans-Hilmar Staudte became FIDE International Judge for Chess Composition. He wrote several books about chess endgame.

== Literature ==
- Staudte, Hans Hilmar: Aus der Welt der Schachstudie. Bad Nauheim, Loeffler, 1961
- Richter, Kurt; Staudte, Hans Hilmar: Richtig und falsch Berlin: de Gruyter, 1962, (2. Aufl. 1978, ISBN 3-11-007428-1)
- Staudte, Hans Hilmar; Milescu, Milu: Das 1×1 des Endspiels Berlin: de Gruyter, 1965 (2. Aufl. 1981, ISBN 3-11-007431-1)
