= Haakon Opsahl =

Norwegian and Canadian chess player

Personal information
- Born: 10 November 1905
- Died: 30 May 2001 (aged 95)

Chess career
- Country: Norway; Canada

Haakon Opsahl (10 November 1905 – 30 May 2001) was a Norwegian and Canadian chess player.

Since the early 1930s he lived in Canadian province Quebec on the coast of Lake Timiskaming. In 1933, Haakon Opsahl participated in U.S. Open Chess Championship. In 1936, he participated in Canadian Chess Championship.

Haakon Opsahl played for Canada (1939) and Norway (1950) in the Chess Olympiads:

- In 1939, at third board in the 8th Chess Olympiad in Buenos Aires (+7, =5, -3),
- In 1950, at reserve board in the 9th Chess Olympiad in Dubrovnik (+0, =1, -8).
