= Marigje Degrande =

Belgian chess player (born 1992)

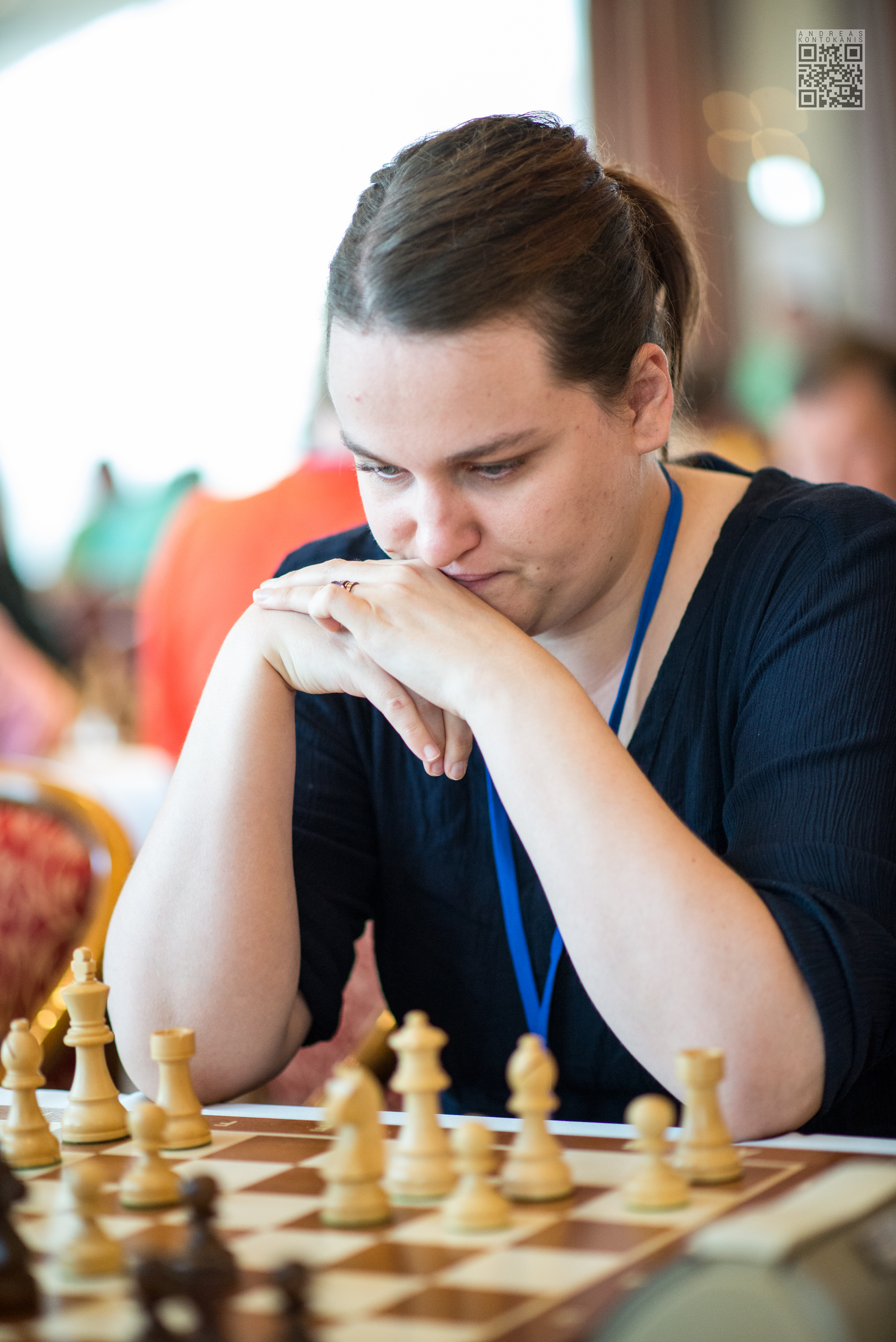
- Degrande in 2022

Personal information
- Born: August 7, 1992 (age 33) Bruges, West Flanders, Belgium

Chess career
- Title: Woman FIDE Master (2021)
- Peak rating: 1947 (March 2024)

Marigje Degrande (born 7 August 1992) is a Belgian chess player who holds the title of Woman FIDE Master (WFM). She was the FIDE Women's World Amateur Chess Champion in the U2000 category in 2021. She is the first Belgian chess player to win a world championship at any level. Degrande became a women's world champion as the top finisher among women in the open under-2000 rating section of the FIDE World Amateur Championship, which earned her the WFM title. She also earned a silver medal in that same event by finishing in shared first overall and runner-up on tiebreaks.

== Background ==
Degrande was born in Bruges, Belgium.

== Chess career ==
Marigje Degrande has won the Women's Belgian Chess Championship for youngsters several times. She was the three time consecutive winner of the Belgian Chess Championship in the Women's category in the years 2006, 2007 and 2008. She came shared first in the Women's U14 category of the European Union Championship in Austria. She participated in several European and World Championships. She became Women's World Champion U2000 by scoring 7½/9 in the open FIDE World Amateur Chess Championship to tie for first. This also earned her the WFM title.

== Notable games ==
1. CM Mahammed Saed Laily
2. Dogu Hasim
3. Ehab Mohamed
4. Astrelin Evgeny
5. WIM Arlette Van Weersel
