= George Kramer (chess player) =

American chess player (1929–2024)

Personal information
- Born: May 15, 1929 New York City, U.S.
- Died: February 21, 2024 (aged 94) Somerset, New Jersey, U.S.

Chess career
- Country: United States
- Peak rating: 2267 (July 2001)

George Mortimer Kramer (May 15, 1929 – February 21, 2024) was an American chess player, Chess Olympiad individual bronze medal winner (1950).

== Biography ==
After World War II George Kramer was one of the most promising new chess players in the United States. In 1945, at the age of sixteen, he won the New York State Chess Championship. In 1946, he debuted in U.S. Chess Championship where ranked at 9th place. In 1952, George Kramer won Manhattan Chess Club Championship.

George Kramer played for United States in the Chess Olympiad:

- In 1950, at reserve board in the 9th Chess Olympiad in Dubrovnik (+5, =5, -3) and won individual bronze medal.

In later years, George Kramer also participated twice in the U.S. Chess Championships (1957, 1962) but ranked less competitively. In the 1960s, he three times won New Jersey State Chess Championships (1964, 1967, 1969).

== Family life ==
George grew up in Brooklyn and Queens, New York, with his parents, Dorothy and Daniel, and his four younger siblings, Herbert, Helen, Lewis, and Yvonne. George attended Brooklyn Tech High School and then Queens College to study chemistry where he sat next to Vivian Kaplan on his first day of civics class. The teacher was often 15 minutes late, so they got to talking—four years later, they married on graduation day. George was progressive and proud to tell anyone how Vivian got a job before graduation at the Franklin Arsenal and then convinced them to hire her boyfriend, allowing them to move to Philadelphia together. The summer before starting at the Arsenal, he traveled to Yugoslavia on a freighter to play in the 1950 Chess Olympics. During that trip, and anytime he was away, he wrote Vivian daily letters which she kept in her nightstand up until her death.

George was drafted into the army during the Korean War, but a perfect score on his entrance exam allowed him to keep working in Philadelphia improving soaps and paints (the war effort needed lots of both of these). He also continued his education, taking chemistry courses at Temple University. After his discharge, he went to the University of Pennsylvania to get his Ph.D. in chemistry. He then started his career with Exxonmobil Research where he worked for 36 years and was a top Corporate Fellow. While there, he and Vivian raised two wonderful children: Steven and Tina, and spent their time visiting with friends and family, playing bridge, and road tripping around the United States for vacations.

George retired at 65. He and Vivian increased their travel, visiting every continent with favorites including India, China, and the Galapagos. When not traveling, they played bridge, socialized, and spent time with their much-loved grandchildren, Rebekah, Aaron, Susan, David, Sara, and Molly, all of whom he took pride in feeding chocolate ice cream to on their first birthday. George also took up painting; creating dozens of striking paintings which are cherished by his family members. He died February 21, 2024, aged 94.
