= Alejandro Maccioni Seisdedos =

Chilean chess player (1919–2014)

Alejandro Maccioni
Personal information
- Full name: Alejandro Maccioni Seisdedos
- Born: 21 February 1919 Collipulli, Chile
- Died: 5 May 2014 (aged 95)

Chess career
- Country: Chile

Alejandro Maccioni Seisdedos (21 February 1919 – 5 May 2014) was a Chilean chess player and pediatrician.

== Biography ==
In the 1940s and 1950s, Maccioni was one of the leading chess players in Chile, participant of many South American international chess tournaments.

Maccioni played for Chile in the Chess Olympiad:

- In 1950, at fourth board in the 9th Chess Olympiad in Dubrovnik (+6, =5, -4).

After education Maccioni was a doctor. He worked as Head of the Pediatric Service of the Hospital Clínico San Borja Arriarán in Santiago de Chile at the beginning of the 1970s until retirement.
