= Stefan Kesten =

French chess player

Personal information
- Born: 18 July 1888 Warsaw, Poland
- Died: 30 June 1953 (aged 64) Paris, France

Chess career
- Country: Poland; France

Stefan Kesten (also Salomon Kestenbaum; 18 July 1888 – 30 June 1953) was a Poland born French chess player.

== Biography ==
Stefan Kesten was born as Salomon Kestenbaum in Warsaw. He had French citizenship from May 1940. Stefan Kesten was one of France's leading chess players in early 1950. He was a chess propagandist at the Café de la Régence and at the luxurious private club of L'Automobile Club de France. After the Second World War Stefan Kesten created the first chess column in a French daily newspaper Combat. The first chronicle appeared in the issue dated June 30 and July 1, 1946 and he retired in May 1950.

Stefan Kesten played for France in the Chess Olympiad:

- In 1950, at fourth board in the 9th Chess Olympiad in Dubrovnik (+1, =2, -6).
