= Paul Devos =

Belgian chess player

Paul Devos (10 March 1911 – 14 June 1981) was a Belgian chess master.

Devos was seven times Belgian Champion (1933, 1936, 1937, 1940, 1941, 1945, and 1948). He finished second, behind Boruch Israel Dyner, at Brussels in 1933 but won the title as a player of the Belgian nationality. In 1936 he won international BEL-ch, and finished third in national BEL-ch, both in Brussels. In 1937 he shared 1st with Alberic O'Kelly de Galway and drew a play-off match for the title (1.5 : 1.5).

He finished third at Brussels 1937 (Quadrangular), behind O'Kelly and Movsas Feigins and ahead of Emil Joseph Diemer, tied for 11–12th at Hastings 1945/46 (Savielly Tartakower won), tied for 9–11th at London 1946 (B tournament, Max Euwe won), and shared 2nd, behind Euwe, at Maastricht 1946.

Devos played twice for Belgium in Chess Olympiads; at Folkestone 1933 and Dubrovnik 1950. He also represented his country in friendly matches against The Netherlands (1947, 1950, 1959) and France (1948, 1949).
