= Aristides Zografakis =

Greek chess player

Personal information
- Born: 1 March 1912
- Died: unknown

Chess career
- Country: Greece

Aristides Zografakis (Greek: Αριστείδης Ζωγραφάκης; 1 March 1912 – unknown) was a Greek chess player.

== Biography ==
In the 1950s Aristides Zografakis was one of Greek leading chess players.

Aristides Zografakis played for Greece in the Chess Olympiads:

- In 1950, at third board in the 9th Chess Olympiad in Dubrovnik (+3, =1, -8),
- In 1952, at second reserve board in the 10th Chess Olympiad in Helsinki (+0, =4, -3),
- In 1958, at second reserve board in the 13th Chess Olympiad in Munich (+5, =3, -2).
