= George Kramer (philatelist) =

American philatelist

George Jay Kramer is an American philatelist who signed the Roll of Distinguished Philatelists in 2005.
