= Belgian Chess Championship =

National chess tournament of Belgium

The Belgian Chess Championship is a championship organised yearly by the Koninklijke Belgische Schaakbond/Fédération Royale Belge des Echecs (Royal Belgium Chess Federation). The winner of the championship is awarded the title: Chess Champion of Belgium.

The first unofficial tournaments were organised by the Cercle des Echecs de Bruxelles (the Chess Club of Brussels). In 1920 the "Fédération Belge des Echecs" (Belgium Chess Federation) was established under the supervision of the four principal chess clubs in Belgium at that time: Brussels, Antwerp, Ghent and Liège. The first official Belgian championship was played in 1921. Two titles were awarded: the title of Champion of Belgium and the title Champion of the Belgium Chess Federation. The title champion of Belgium was reserved for players of the Belgian nationality, whereas non-Belgians could win the championship of the federation. A separate Belgian championship for women was established in 1938. In 1970 the Fédération Belge des Echecs was renamed the Fédération Royale Belge des Echecs and from then on there is only one title, the Chess Champion of Belgium.

- In 1936 there were three Belgian championships, because of fact that some players did not agree with the BSF's way of organising the championship and decided to hold their own. They held actually two: one where only Belgian players were allowed and one international championship.

== Winners ==
Year	City (Men)	Champion of Belgium	Women's Champion	Champion of the federation
1901	Brussels	Eugène Pécher		
1905	Brussels	E. E. Middleton		
1906	Brussels	E. E. Middleton		
1913	Brussels	(F-H. Königs)		
1921	Brussels	Nicholas Borochovitz		Nicholas Borochovitz
1922	Antwerp	Edgard Colle		Edgard Colle
1923	Ghent	George Koltanowski		George Koltanowski
1924	Brussels	Edgard Colle		Edgard Colle
1925	Brussels	Edgard Colle		Edgard Colle
1926		-		Edgard Colle
1927	Ghent	(George Koltanowski)		-
1928	Ghent	Edgard Colle		Edgard Colle
1929	Antwerp, Brussels	Edgard Colle		Edgard Colle
1930	Verviers	George Koltanowski		George Koltanowski
1931	Brussels	Marcel Barzin		Marcel Barzin
1932	Brussels	J. Kornreich		Boruch Israel Dyner; Victor Soultanbeieff
1933	Brussels	Paul Devos		Boruch Israel Dyner
1934	Liège	-		Victor Soultanbeieff
1935	Antwerp	Arthur Dunkelblum		Boruch Israel Dyner
1936	Ghent	George Koltanowski		George Koltanowski
*	Brussels	Albéric O'Kelly de Galway		Paul Devos
1937	Brussels	Albéric O'Kelly de Galway; Paul Devos		Albéric O'Kelly de Galway; Paul Devos
1938	Namur	Albéric O'Kelly de Galway	Marianne Stoffels	Albéric O'Kelly de Galway
1939		-	Marianne Stoffels	-
1940	Ghent	Paul Devos	Marianne Stoffels	Frits Van Seters
1941	Brussels	Paul Devos	Elisabeth Cuypers	Paul Devos
1942	Brussels	Albéric O'Kelly de Galway	Marianne Stoffels	Frits Van Seters
1943	Brussels	Albéric O'Kelly de Galway	Elisabeth Cuypers	Victor Soultanbeieff
1944	Brussels	Albéric O'Kelly de Galway	Marianne Stoffels	Louis Ambühl; Albéric O'Kelly de Galway
1945	Ghent	Paul Devos	Elisabeth Cuypers	Paul Devos
1946	Antwerp	Albéric O'Kelly de Galway	-	-
1947	Ostend	Albéric O'Kelly de Galway	? Spoormans	-
1948	Bruges	Paul Devos	Simone Bussers	-
1949	Bruges	Arthur Dunkelblum	Simone Bussers	Frits Van Seters
1950	Ghent	Robert Lemaire	Simone Bussers	-
1951	Verviers	Albéric O'Kelly de Galway	Simone Bussers	Albéric O'Kelly de Galway
1952	Ghent	Albéric O'Kelly de Galway	Simone Bussers	Albéric O'Kelly de Galway
1953	Eupen	Albéric O'Kelly de Galway	Simone Bussers	Albéric O'Kelly de Galway
1954	Bruges	Jos Gobert	Louise Loeffler	-
1955	Merksem	Jos Gobert	Louisa Ceulemans	-
1956	Blankenberge	Albéric O'Kelly de Galway	Louisa Ceulemans	Albéric O'Kelly de Galway
1957	Blankenberge	Albéric O'Kelly de Galway	Louisa Ceulemans	Victor Soultanbeieff
1958	Blankenberge	Alfons Franck	Louise Loeffler	Jozef Boey
1959	Blankenberge	Albéric O'Kelly de Galway; Jozef Boey	Louise Loeffler	Frits Van Seters
1960	Ghent	Robert Willaert	Louise Loeffler	Nikola Karaklajic
1961	Heist	Paul Limbos	Louise Loeffler	Victor Soultanbeieff
1962	Brussels	Robert Willaert	-	Frits Van Seters
1963	Ghent	Paul Limbos	-	Paul Limbos
1964	Mechelen	Jozef Boey	E Lancel	Jozef Boey
1965	Antwerp	Jozef Boey	-	Frits Van Seters
1966	Brussels	François Cornelis	-	Frits Van Seters
1967	Ostend	Jan Rooze	Louise Loeffler	Frits Van Seters
1968	Brussels	Robert Willaert; Albert Vandezande	Elisabeth Cuypers	Y. Ebrahimi
1969	Spa	Helmut Schumacher	-	Helmut Schumacher
1970	Ghent	Karl Van Schoor	Caroline Vanderbeken	Frits Van Seters
1971	Bredene	Jozef Boey; Roeland Verstraeten	-	
1972	Hasselt	Friedhelm Freise	-	
1973	Ostend	Robert Willaert	-	
1974	Hasselt	Jean Moeyersons	-	
1975	Ghent	Johan Goormachigh; José Tonoli; Henri Winants	Brenda Decorte	
1976	Ostend	Gunter Deleyn	-	
1977	Ostend	Ronald Weemaes	-	
1978	Eupen	Richard Meulders	-	
1979	Ghent	Gunter Deleyn	-	
1980	Sint-Niklaas	Alain Defize	Simonne Peeters	
1981	Sint-Niklaas	Richard Meulders; Ronny Weemaes	Simonne Peeters	
1982	Zwijnaarde	Johan Goormachtigh; Thierry Penson	Brenda Decorte	
1983	Veurne	Richard Meulders; Alain Defize	Simonne Peeters	
1984	Huy	Michel Jadoul	Simonne Peeters	
1985	Ghent	Richard Meulders	Isabel Hund	
1986	Anderlecht	Luc Winants	Viviane Caels	
1987	Ostend	Robert Schuermans	Viviane Caels	
1988	Huy	Michel Jadoul; Richard Meulders	Chantal Vandevoort	
1989	Ghent	Richard Meulders	Gina Lynne LoSasso	
1990	Brasschaat	Michel Jadoul	Martine Vanhecke	
1991	Geraardsbergen	Richard Meulders	Anne-Marie Maeckelbergh	
1992	Morlanwelz	Michel Jadoul	Martina Sproten	
1993	Visé	Gorik Cools	Greta Foulon	
1994	Charleroi	Ekrem Cekro	Greta Foulon	
1995	Geel	Ekrem Cekro	Greta Foulon	
1996	Geel	Marc Dutreeuw	Snezana Micic	
1997	Ghent	Juri Vetemaa; Ekrem Cekro	Snezana Micic	
1998	Liège	Ekrem Cekro	Chantal Vandevoort	
1999	Geel	Pieter Claesen; Serge Vanderwaeren	Iris Neels	
2000	Ghent	Vladimir Chuchelov	Irina Gorshkova	
2001	Charleroi	Mikhail Gurevich	Irina Gorshkova	
2002	Borgerhout	Alexandre Dgebuadze	Sophie Brion	
2003	Eupen	Geert Van der Stricht	Irina Gorshkova	
2004	Westerlo	Bart Michiels	Heidi Vints	
2005	Aalst	Alexandre Dgebuadze	Elena Van Hoecke	
2006	Namur	Shahin Mohandesi	Marigje Degrande	
2007	Namur	Alexandre Dgebuadze	Marigje Degrande	
2008	Eupen	Bruno Laurent	Wiebke Barbier and Marigje Degrande	
2009	Namur	Mher Hovhanisian	Hanne Goossens	
2010	Westerlo	Mher Hovhanisian	Wiebke Barbier	
2011	Westerlo	Bart Michiels	Anna Zozulia	
2012	Lommel	Tanguy Ringoir	Wiebke Barbier	
2013	Antwerp	Tanguy Ringoir	[./Https://nl.wikipedia.org/wiki/Irina_Gorshkova Irina Gorshkova]	
2014	Charleroi	Geert Van der Stricht	Astrid Barbier	
2015	Schelle	Mher Hovhanisian	Hanne Goossens	
2016	Buetgenbach	Tanguy Ringoir	Hanne Goossens	
2017	Niel	Mher Hovhanisian	Wiebke Barbier	
2018	Charleroi	Mher Hovhanisian	Hanne Goossens	
2019	Roux	Daniel Dardha		
2020	Bruges	Alexandre Dgebuadze		
2021	Bruges	Daniel Dardha		
2022	Bruges	Daniel Dardha		
2023	Bruges	Lennert Lenaerts		
2024	Lier	Daniel Dardha		
2025	Westerlo	Sim Maerevoet		
2026	Antwerp	Daniel Dardha	Hanne Goossens	
