= George Koltanowski =

Chess master

- Koltanowski c. 1975

Personal information
- Born: 17 September 1903 Antwerp, Belgium
- Died: 5 February 2000 (aged 96)

Chess career
- Country: Belgium, United States
- Title: International Master (1950); Grandmaster (honorary, 1988)

George Koltanowski (also "Georges"; 17 September 1903 – 5 February 2000) was a Belgian-born American chess player, promoter, and writer. He was informally known as "Kolty". Koltanowski set the world's blindfold record on 20 September 1937, in Edinburgh, by playing 34 chess games simultaneously while blindfolded, making headline news around the world. He also set a record in 1960 for playing 56 consecutive blindfold games at ten seconds per move.

== Early life ==
Born into a Polish Jewish family in Antwerp, Belgium, Koltanowski learned chess by watching his father and brother play. He took up the game seriously at the age of 14, and became the top Belgian player when Edgard Colle died in 1932.

== Chess career ==
He got his first big break in chess at age 21, when he visited an international tournament in Meran, planning to play in one of the reserve sections. The organizers were apparently confused or mixed up about his identity and asked him to play in the grandmaster section, to replace an invited player who had not shown up. Koltanowski gladly accepted and finished near the bottom, but he drew with Grandmaster Tarrasch and gained valuable experience.

He thereafter played in at least 25 international tournaments. He was Belgian Chess Champion in 1923, 1927, 1930, and 1936. Koltanowski became better known for touring and giving simultaneous exhibitions and blindfold displays.

Based upon his results during the period 1932–37, Professor Arpad Elo gave Koltanowski a rating of 2450 in The Rating of Chess Players. Koltanowski was awarded the International Master title in 1950 when the title was first officially established by FIDE, and he was awarded an honorary Grandmaster title in 1988. Koltanowski's record as a tournament player was not especially distinguished. He showed up for the 1946 U.S. Open in Pittsburgh, but was eliminated in the preliminary section and did not qualify for the finals.

In those years, the U.S. Open was played in round-robin preliminary and final sections. The next year, Koltanowski returned, not as a player but as the director, introducing the Swiss system to the U.S. Open. He directed the 1947 U.S. Open in Corpus Christi, Texas, using the Swiss system for the first time ever in a U.S. Open chess event. After that, he traversed the country, holding Swiss system tournaments everywhere. Before long, the Swiss system was adopted as the standard for most chess tournaments in America.

Koltanowski thereafter toured the United States tirelessly for years, running chess tournaments and giving simultaneous exhibitions everywhere. After his failure in the 1946 U.S. Open in Pittsburgh, he never played tournament chess again, except for two games as a member of the U.S. team in the 10th Chess Olympiad (Helsinki 1952), getting a draw with Soviet Grandmaster Alexander Kotov, one of the strongest players in the world, and a draw with Hungarian International Master Tibor Florian, in a game which Koltanowski appeared to be winning.

== Blindfold chess ==
On 4 December 1960, in San Francisco, California, Koltanowski played 56 consecutive games blindfolded, with only ten seconds per move. He won fifty and drew six games.

== Simultaneous blindfold chess ==
Possessed of an incredibly powerful memory, Koltanowski would give blindfold exhibitions, playing several games simultaneously. In Edinburgh in 1937 Koltanowski set a record by simultaneously playing 34 games of blindfold chess. Later, Miguel Najdorf broke that record, but Koltanowski claimed his efforts were not properly monitored. Najdorf played 40 games at Rosario, Argentina in 1943 and 45 games in São Paulo in 1947.

== Later years ==
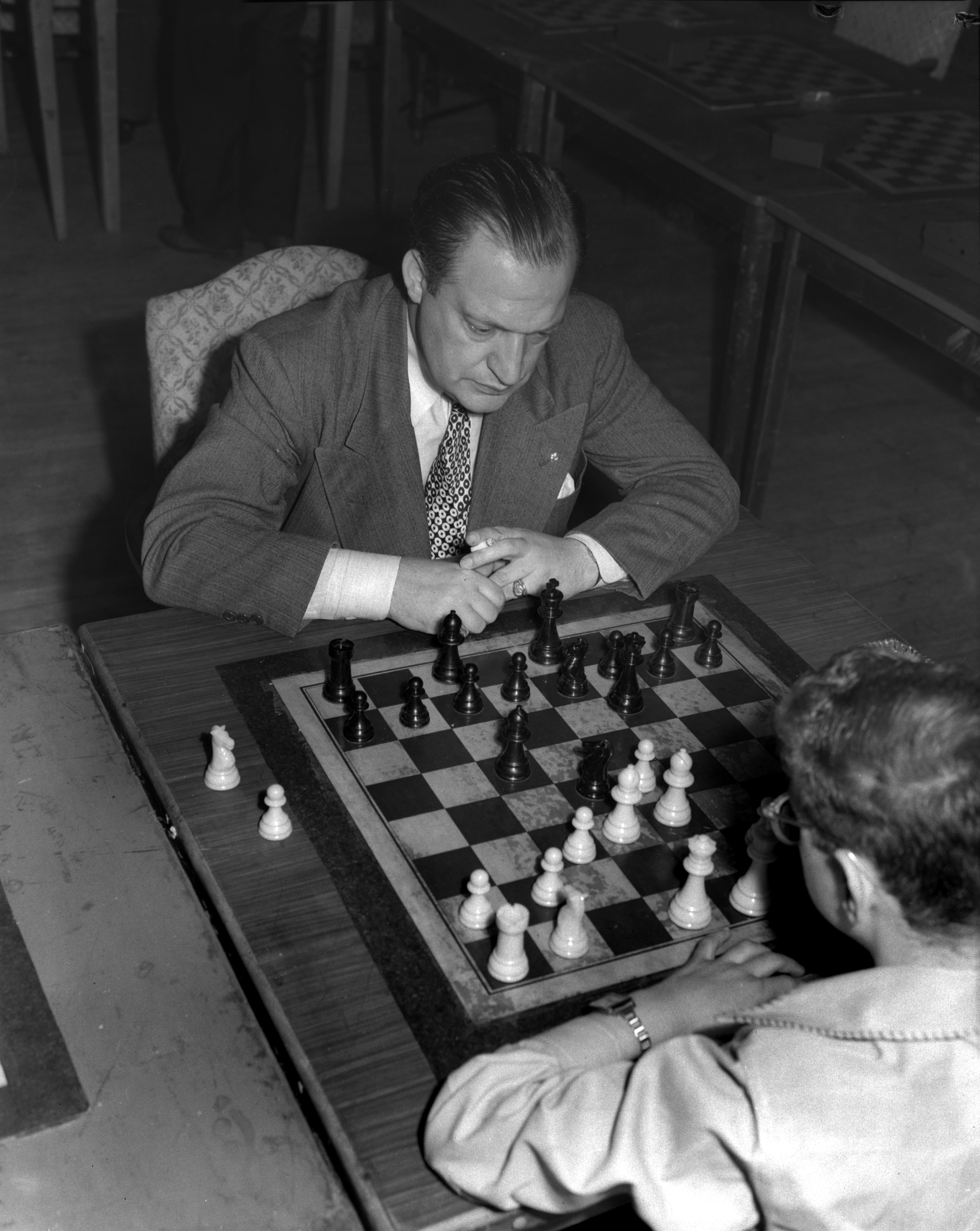
Koltanowski at Oak Ridge in 1948

Many of Koltanowski's relatives were murdered in the Holocaust. Koltanowski survived because he happened to be on a chess tour of South America and was in Guatemala when the war broke out. In 1940, the United States Consul in Cuba saw Koltanowski giving a chess exhibition in Havana and decided to grant him a U.S. visa.

Koltanowski met his wife Leah on a blind date in New York in 1944. They settled in San Francisco in 1947. Koltanowski became the chess columnist for the San Francisco Chronicle, which carried his chess column every day for the next 52 years until his death, publishing an estimated 19,000 columns. Even after his death, twenty-two more columns appeared bearing his name, before Shelby Lyman took over.

The FIDE named him International Arbiter in 1960.

Koltanowski played a newspaper game against grandmaster Paul Keres. Following a system similar to that adopted in the Kasparov versus The World match, readers would vote on moves and send them into the Chronicle. Koltanowski would select the move actually played, and would award points and prizes to his readers for their selections. However, after about only 25 moves, Keres abruptly stopped the game and declared himself the winner by adjudication. Koltanowski disagreed and showed analysis which seemed to give him at least an even game. Keres, an Estonian, may have been ordered by his Soviet handlers to stop playing.

Koltanowski had his own organization, the Chess Friends of Northern California, which resisted the USCF rating system and dominated Northern California Chess through the mid-1960s. Koltanowski later decided "if you can't beat 'em, join 'em". He won election as President of the United States Chess Federation in 1974. He also directed every US Open from 1947 until the late 1970s. He was sometimes referred to as the "Dean of American Chess."

Perhaps Koltanowski's most remarkable accomplishment was that he made his living entirely from chess. He wrote many books; his best-known work is Adventures of a Chess Master, published by David McKay Co. in 1955. In it, he recounts primarily his tours giving blindfolded simultaneous exhibitions. He also wrote books on the Colle System which he sold by mail order. He taught a system which would enable even rank beginners to get out of the opening with a playable game. This saved his students the trouble of memorizing vast amounts of chess opening theory. However, he never played this opening himself against strong opponents.

Koltanowski's books contained many statements and anecdotes which were factually incorrect. They were also lax in terms of spelling and editorial standards.

Koltanowski died of congestive heart failure in San Francisco in 2000 at the age of 96.

== Blindfold Knight's Tour ==
Koltanowski's most sensational chess entertainment was the ancient exercise known as the Knight's tour, in which a lone knight traverses an otherwise empty board visiting each square once only. Of the countless patterns for achieving this feat, there are trillions of sequences for performing the more restricted version known as the re-entrant (or closed) tour, wherein the knight on its 64th move lands on its original starting square. For Koltanowski, who claimed to have a "phonographic memory" (a keen memory for sequences), the trick relied on mastering just one re-entrant pattern. He could begin on any square in the sequence and complete the tour by rote. However, it was his original twist that gave Koltanowski's performance dramatic value well beyond the mechanical moving of the knight through the memorized sequence.

Koltanowski began his tour with a large chalkboard divided by lines into a grid eight squares by eight. As he solved problems on a large demonstration board, audience members were encouraged to come onstage to enter words and numbers into the squares. By the time all 64 squares were filled, it was common to see street and city names, names of months or days of the week, names of famous chess players, names of audience members, names of movie stars or TV personalities, telephone numbers and addresses, birth dates, serial numbers from bank notes, etc.

After concluding his problem solving challenges on the demonstration board, Koltanowski would turn his back on the audience and examine the chalk board for three or four minutes. Then he would seat himself with his back to the board and ask for any audience member to call out a square; for example, e4. He would recite from memory the entry in that square as an assistant crossed it off with a chalk mark. Making imaginary knight-moves through his re-entry sequence, Koltanowski would recite the contents of each square as the knight landed on it.

As amazing as this performance was, if time permitted afterward, Koltanowski would occasionally demonstrate his mental grasp of the board by reciting the information contained in the squares by rank or file, or even the two long diagonals. He occasionally performed the tour on two boards simultaneously. In Palo Alto, California, he conducted his performance on three chalk boards, jumping the knight back and forth between boards mid-move, until all 192 squares were completed. He made two errors and immediately corrected himself both times. At the time of this performance, Koltanowski was 80 years old.
