= Edgard Colle =

Belgian chess master (1897–1932)

Personal information
- Born: 18 May 1897 Ghent, Belgium
- Died: 19 April 1932 (aged 34) Ghent, Belgium

Chess career
- Country: Belgium

Edgard Colle (18 May 1897 – 19 April 1932) was a Belgian chess master. He scored excellent results in major international tournaments, including first at Amsterdam 1926, ahead of Savielly Tartakower and future world champion Max Euwe; first at Meran 1926, in a strong field ahead of Esteban Canal; and won twice outright at Scarborough in 1927, and again in 1930, ahead of Maróczy and Rubinstein.

Colle's playing career was cut short by ill health. He survived three difficult operations for a gastric ulcer and died after a fourth at the age of 34 in Ghent.

Hans Kmoch wrote that Colle "was not sentimental. He bore his sufferings as something quite private and of minor importance. He asked for no special consideration, he was always in good humor and a boon companion in company; but at the board he was a relentless fighter guided by a really ideal sense of duty and sportsmanship".

== Legacy ==
Colle is remembered today primarily for his introduction of the chess opening now known as the Colle System: 1.d4 d5 2.Nf3 Nf6 3.e3. White normally follows up with Bd3, 0-0, and Nbd2, playing for a central pawn break with e4. The opening is in effect a reversed Semi-Slav Defense. In response to ...c5 by Black, White typically plays c3. The Colle System was most often played in the late 1920s and 1930s. Colle himself played it from 1925 until his death in 1932. He won many games with the opening, including a number of brilliancies. Colle–O'Hanlon, Nice 1930, featuring one of the best-known examples of a Greek gift sacrifice, is especially famous.

The opening gained popularity, especially in the United States, through the efforts of Belgian-American International Master George Koltanowski, who remained faithful to it throughout his long career, and wrote several books on it. Koltanowski said he played the opening as a tribute to his friend Colle. The opening is sometimes referred to as the Colle–Koltanowski.

The Colle System fell out of favor in high-level play as good defenses were found for Black. Chess theory today regards it as safe but somewhat passive. However, because of its solid pawn structure, logical piece placement, and coherent strategic aims, the opening is often taught to novice players as a safe and dependable way to reach a playable middlegame. Thus, the Colle System is frequently seen in amateur and scholastic tournaments, but is not common in professional play; however, it has been used in recent times by grandmasters Pia Cramling, Susan Polgar, Artur Yusupov, who prefers to play with b3 and a queenside fianchetto, a setup known as the Colle–Zukertort, and, most notably, Magnus Carlsen.
