= Albéric O'Kelly de Galway =

Belgian chess grandmaster (1911–1980)

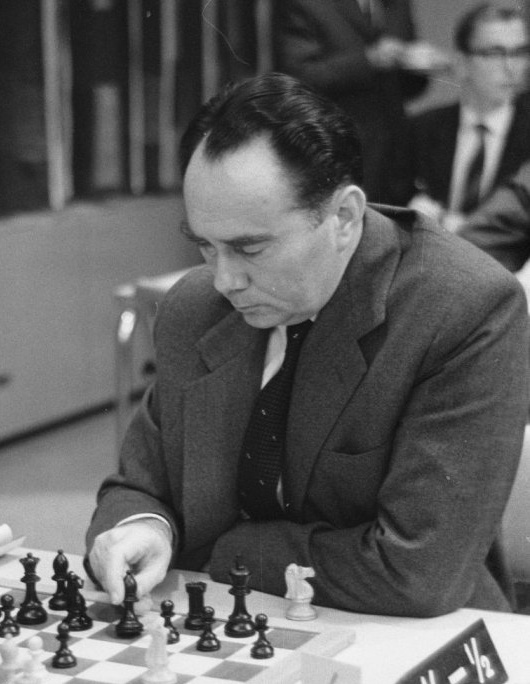
- O'Kelly in 1961

Personal information
- Full name: Albéric Joseph Rodolphe Marie Robert Ghislain O'Kelly de Galway
- Born: 17 May 1911 Anderlecht, Belgium
- Died: 3 October 1980 (aged 69) Brussels, Belgium

Chess career
- Country: Belgium
- Title: FIDE Grandmaster (1956); ICCF Grandmaster (1962)
- ICCF World Champion: 1959–62
- Peak rating: 2460 (January 1977)
- ICCF rating: 2529 (July 1992)

Albéric Joseph Rodolphe Marie Robert Ghislain O'Kelly de Galway (17 May 1911 – 3 October 1980) was a Belgian chess Grandmaster (1956), an International Correspondence Chess Grandmaster (1962), and the third ICCF World Champion in correspondence chess (1959–1962). He was also a chess writer.

== Chess career ==
O'Kelly won the Belgian championships thirteen times between 1937 and 1959. He placed first at Beverwijk 1946. In 1947, he became one of Europe's leading players, having finished first at the 1947 European Zonal tournament at Hilversum, tied for first place with Pirc at Teplice Sanov, and tied for second at Venice. The next year, O'Kelly finished first at São Paulo ahead of Eliskases and Rossetto. He earned the title International Master (IM) in 1950, the first year the title was awarded. He placed first at Dortmund 1951. O'Kelly finished first at the round-robin Utrecht 1961 with 6½/9, followed by Karl Robatsch second with 6 points and Arthur Bisguier and Aleksandar Matanović tied for third and fourth with 5½. He took part in The Gijón International Chess Tournaments (1949 and 1956), achieving respectively 2nd and 4th places.

In 1958, he was awarded the Belgian decoration of the Golden Palm of the Order of the Crown, for his chess successes and the distinction he had brought to the nation.

O'Kelly was made an International Arbiter in 1962 and was the chief arbiter of the world championship matches between Tigran Petrosian and Boris Spassky in 1966 and 1969. In 1974, he was the arbiter for the Moscow Karpov–Korchnoi match.

He spoke French, Dutch, German, English, Spanish, and Russian fluently, and also some Italian. He published many books and articles, often in languages other than French. As a youth, he took lessons from Akiba Rubinstein.

== Ancestry ==
O'Kelly was descended from John O'Kelly, an Irish-born British army officer who was granted a nobility title in 1720 in what was then the Austrian Low Countries. Consequently, he was often styled as 'Count O'Kelly de Galway', for example on the front cover of his 1965 book about Petrosian.

== Legacy ==
The O'Kelly Variation in the Sicilian Defence: 1.e4 c5 2.Nf3 a6 is named after him.

== Books ==
- O'Kelly de Galway, Albéric; Littlewood, John (1965), Tigran Petrosian: World Champion, Elsevier, ISBN 978-0-0801-1012-7
- O'Kelly de Galway, Albéric (1969), The Sicilian Flank Game (Najdorf Variation), Batsford, ISBN 978-0-7134-0351-0
- O'Kelly de Galway, Albéric (1976), Assess Your Chess Fast: From Expert to Master, Batsford, ISBN 978-0-7134-1055-6
- O'Kelly de Galway, Albéric (1978), Improve Your Chess Fast, Batsford, ISBN 0-7134-1053-1

== Notable games ==
- Alberic O'Kelly de Galway vs Arnold Denker, Mar del Plata 1948, Spanish Game: Schliemann Defense, Dyckhoff Variation (C63), 1–0
- Christian Poulsen vs Alberic O'Kelly de Galway, Dubrovnik olm 1950, Sicilian Defense: O'Kelly Variation. Normal System (B28), 0–1
- Alberic O'Kelly de Galway vs Jonathan Penrose, Olympiad 1962, Sicilian Defense: Paulsen, Bastrikov Variation (B47), ½–½
- Robert James Fischer vs Alberic O'Kelly de Galway Havana CAP 1965, Spanish Game: Marshall Attack, Modern Variation (C89), ½–½

Preceded by (Soviet Union) Viacheslav Ragozin	World Correspondence Chess Champion; 1959–1962	Succeeded by (Soviet Union) Vladimir Zagorovsky
