= Rootare =

Family name

Rootare is a surname of Estonian origin and may refer to:

- Hillar Rootare (1928–2008), Estonian-born American physical chemist
- Salme Rootare (1913–1987), Estonian chess master
- Vidrik Rootare (1906–1981), Estonian chess player

== Other uses ==
- Rootare–Prenzlow equation, an equation named after Hillar Rootare and Carl Prenzlow that formulated a means to calculate cumulative surface areas of porous solids based on data taken in mercury porosimetry testing.
