= Tuuli (name) =

Female given name

- Gender: Female
- Languages: Estonian, Finnish

Origin
- Meaning: wind
- Region of origin: Estonia, Finland

Other names
- Related names: Tuulikki, Tuuliki, Tuulia, Tuulike, Tuule

Tuuli (Finno-Permic "wind") is a Finnish and Estonian feminine given name and may refer to:

- Tuuli Hypén (born 1983), Finnish cartoonist
- Tuuli Koch (born 1978), Estonian journalist
- Tuuli Luukas (born 1966), Finnish artist
- Tuuli Matinsalo (born 1970), Finnish aerobic gymnast
- Tuuli Mattelmäki (born 1965), Finnish industrial designer, researcher and lecturer
- Tuuli Merikoski (born 1967), Finnish middle distance runner
- Tuuli Narkle, Australian actress
- Tuuli Petäjä-Sirén (born 1983), Finnish windsurfer
- Tuuli Rand (born 1990), Estonian singer
- Tuuli Rannikko (born 1947), Finnish writer
- Tuuli Reijonen (1904–1997), Finnish writer and translator
- Tuuli Roosma (born 1975), Estonian TV journalist and producer
- Tuuli Takala (born 1987), Finnish opera singer
- Tuuli Tallinen (born 2006), Finnish ice hockey player
- Tuuli Tasa (born 2002), Estonian footballer
- Tuuli Tomingas (born 1995), Estonian biathlete
- Tuuli Vahtra (born 1989), Estonian chess player
- Tuuli Velling (née Tuuli Taul, born 1986), Estonian singer and poet
