= Urve =

Female given name

- Gender: Female
- Language: Estonian
- Name day: 25 May

Origin
- Region of origin: Estonia

Other names
- Related names: Urban

Urve is an Estonian feminine given name. It is related to masculine name Urban. It may refer to any of the following persons:

- Urve Karuks (1936–2015), poet and translator
- Urve Kure (1931–2016), chess player
- Urve Manuel, Canadian glass artist
- Urve Palo (born 1972), politician
- Urve Tamberg (born c. 1960s), Canadian author
- Urve Tauts (born 1935), opera singer
- Urve Tiidus (born 1954), politician and television journalist
- Urve Uusberg (born 1953), conductor and psychologist
