= Aleksandr Volodin =

Aleksandr Volodin may refer to:

- Aleksandr Volodin (linguist) (1935–2017), Soviet and Russian linguist
- Aleksandr Volodin (playwright) (1919–2001), Soviet and Russian playwright, screenwriter and poet
- Aleksandr Volodin (chess player) (born 1990), Estonian chess player
