= Roman Toi =

Estonian-Canadian composer, choir conductor, and organist (1916–2018)

- Born: 18 June 1916; Kõo Parish, Governorate of Livonia, Russian Empire
- Died: 7 May 2018 (aged 101) Toronto, Canada
- Occupations: composer, conductor, organist

Roman Toi (18 June 1916 – 7 May 2018) was an Estonian-Canadian composer, choir conductor, and organist. Influenced by Ralph Vaughan Williams, Toi's music is melodic, lyrical, and melancholic in style. His compositional output includes nine cantatas (composed 1953–77), three symphonies (1969, 1972, 1974), and more than 80 choral works. Many of his compositions have become part of the standard Estonian choral repertoire.

== Life and career ==
Born in Kõo Parish, in the Governorate of Livonia of the Russian Empire (now Estonia), Toi became a naturalized Canadian citizen in 1957. He began his professional education at the Institute of Advanced Studies in Montreux, Switzerland and then studied at the Mozarteum University of Salzburg from 1942 to 1943 where he was a pupil of Clemens Krauss. He spent the next six years conducting and writing music for choirs, theatre, and radio in Europe.

In 1949 Toi emigrated to Canada where he initially settled in Montreal. In 1951 he moved to Toronto where he began conducting the Estonian Male Choir just a year later. He became the conductor of the Estonia Mixed Choir in 1957, a position he held until 1972. From 1952 to 1968 he served as the organist-choirmaster of Centennial United Church. He also worked frequently as a guest conductor at choral festivals internationally. In 1973 and 1974 he served as president of the Ontario Choral Federation. In 1976 he founded the 85-voice Estonia Choir with whom he toured North America frequently. The choir also gave concert tours in Israel (1987), Australia (1988), and Estonia (1989, 1990) under his leadership.

In 1971 Toi entered The Royal Conservatory of Music (RCM) where he studied under Samuel Dolin and earned an associates diploma in music composition in 1973. The following year he joined the faculty of the RCM teaching courses in theory, conducting, and composition. He earned a Doctor of Philosophy from Union Graduate School in 1977.

He turned 100 in June 2016 and died in May 2018 at the age of 101 in Toronto, Canada.
