= Volodin =

Volodin (masculine, Russian: Володин) or Volodina (feminine, Russian: Володина) is a Russian surname that is derived from Volodya, a pet form of the male given name Vladimir, and literally means Volodya's. Notable people with the surname include:

- Aleksandr Volodin, (born 1990), Estonian chess player
- Aleksandr Volodin (1935–2017), Soviet and Russian linguist
- Aleksandr Volodin (1919–2001), Soviet and Russian playwright, screenwriter and poet
- Aleksey Volodin (born 1977), Russian pianist
- Denis Volodin (born 1982), Kazakhstani professional footballer
- Eduard Volodin (1939–2001), Russian philosopher and publicist
- Eugenia Volodina (born 1984), Russian model
- Margarita Volodina (born 1932), Soviet Russian actress
- Nikolay Volodin (1977–2002), Russian militarist, Hero of Second Chechen War
- Nikita Volodin, Russian figure skater
- Vasilisa Volodina (born 1974), Russian television presenter
- Vyacheslav Volodin (born 1964), Russian politician
