= Baltic Americans =

Baltic Americans are Americans of Baltic descent. The term generally includes:

- Latvian Americans
- Lithuanian Americans
- Estonian Americans (depending on definition)
- Finnish Americans (depending on definition)
