= Kirill Chukavin =

Estonian chess player (born 2002)

Personal information
- Born: 25 June 2002 (age 24) Tallinn, Estonia

Chess career
- Country: Estonia
- Title: FIDE Master (2018)
- FIDE rating: 2362 (June 2026)
- Peak rating: 2418 (July 2022)

Kirill Chukavin (born 25 June 2002) is an Estonian chess player who holds the title of FIDE Master (2018). He won the Estonian Chess Championship winner in 2025.

== Biography ==
Kirill Chukavin is student of Tallinn chess school. He won medals in the Estonian Youth Chess Championships: gold in the O16 age group (2016), and in O18 age group (2018, 2020). In 2019 he won Estonian Junior Chess Championship. He has represented Estonia several times at the European Youth Chess Championships and World Youth Chess Championships.

In 2022 he won annual chess tournament Saaremaa Cup.

In 2017 he won bronze medal in Estonian Chess Championship.

In December 2025 Kirill Chukavin won his first senior national chess title by defeating three-time Estonian chess champion Grandmaster Meelis Kanep in the final.

In 2021, he graduated from Lasnamäe Gymnasium.
