= Tuulikki =

Tuulikki may refer to:

- Tuulikki (name), a Finnish female given name
- Hanna Tuulikki, Finnish-English vocalist, musician and artist
- Tuulikki (spirit), a forest goddess or spirit in Eastern Finnish mythology, Tapio's daughter
- 2716 Tuulikki, a minor planet discovered by Y. Väisälä
- Tuulikki Mons, a mountain on Venus
- Tuulikki–Vampula, a minor airport in Vampula, Finland
