= Liam Vrolijk =

Dutch chess grandmaster (born 2002)

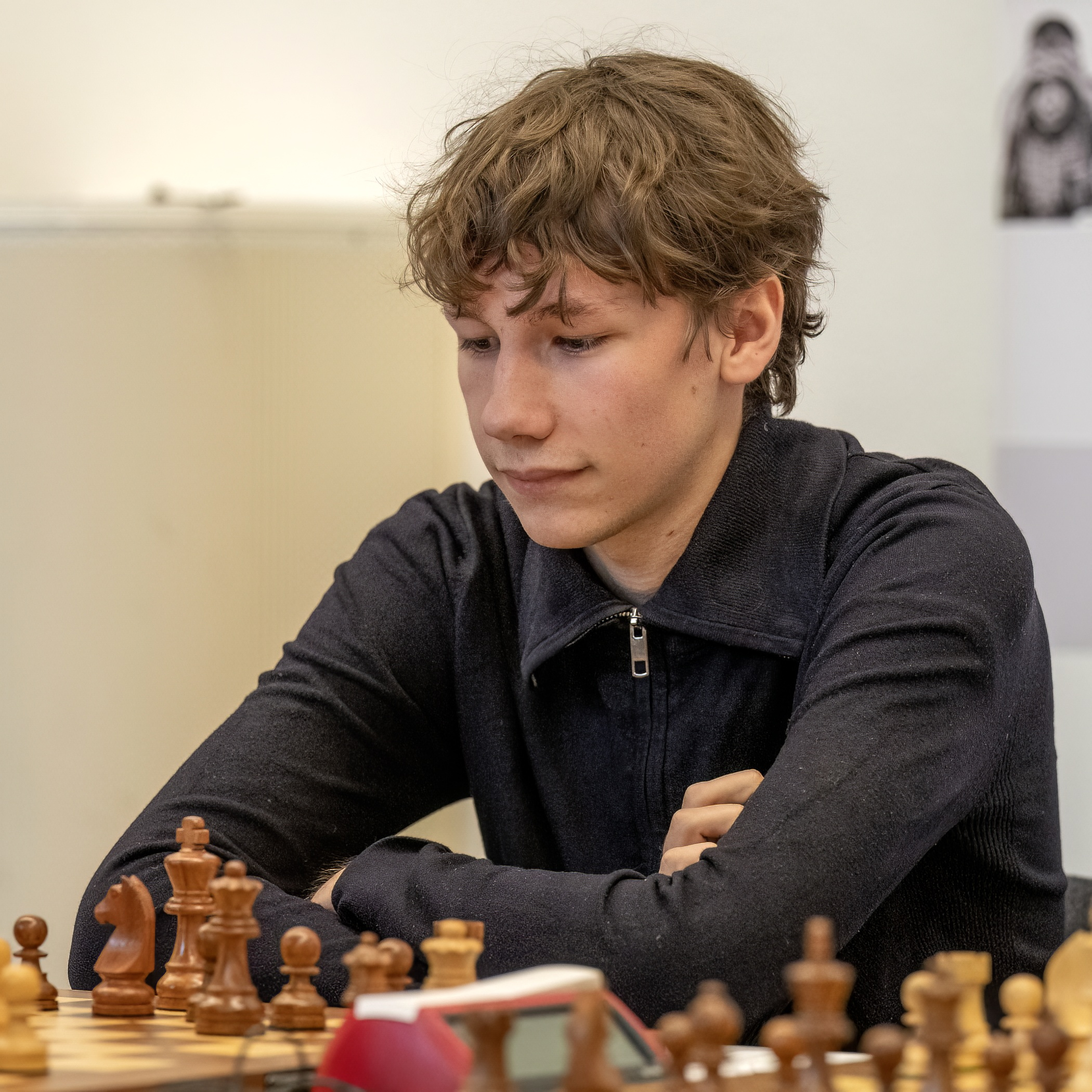
- Vrolijk in 2023

Personal information
- Born: July 5, 2002 (age 24) Capelle aan den IJssel, Netherlands

Chess career
- Country: Netherlands
- Title: Grandmaster (2022)
- FIDE rating: 2524 (August 2026)
- Peak rating: 2573 (January 2024)

Liam Vrolijk is a Dutch chess grandmaster.

== Chess career ==
In December 2018, Vrolijk tied for first place with grandmaster Ottomar Ladva in the Groningen Chess Festival. Vrolijk lost the championship to Ottomar Ladva on tiebreaks, though defeated grandmaster Roeland Pruijssers in the final round.

In April 2020, Vrolijk was defeated by Ahmed Adly in the Sunway Sitges International Online Chess Open, which was the first online Swiss tournament held under classical time controls.

In February 2021, Vrolijk tied for 13th place with a score of 8.5/11 in the Titled Tuesday Blitz tournament. At the event, he managed draws against higher-rated players Mustafa Yılmaz and Rudik Makarian.

In August 2022, Vrolijk fulfilled all of the requirements for the Grandmaster title, and was awarded the title later in the year.

Vrolijk competed in the Challengers section of the Tata Steel Chess Tournament 2024, where he defeated higher-rated grandmasters Leon Luke Mendonca and Mustafa Yılmaz.
