= Marie Orav =

Estonian chess player

Personal information
- Born: December 23, 1911 Pikeliai, Telšiai County, Russian Empire
- Died: January 4, 1994 (aged 82) Tallinn, Estonia

Chess career
- Country: Russia; Estonia; Soviet Union; Estonia

Marie Orav (23 December 1911 – 4 January 1994) was an Estonian chess player, who twice won the Estonian Women's Chess Championship – 1952, 1959.

== Biography ==
In 1929 Marie Orav graduated from gymnasium in Tartu. Marie Orav was one of the first women chess players in Estonia in the 1930s. In 1937, she won Tallinn Chess Championship for women. In 1938, she was first of the Estonian who participated in international women chess tournament. In 1945 Marie Orav lost the Estonian Women's Championship title match to Salme Rootare - 6½:7½. In Estonian Chess Championships for women she has won 2 gold (1952, 1959), 5 silver (1945, 1948, 1954, 1958, 1960) and 3 bronze (1950, 1956, 1957) medals. Marie Orav played for Estonia in Soviet Team Chess Championship in 1959. By the end of life participated in the chess tournaments. She worked in the food industry.
