= Estonian Chess Championship =

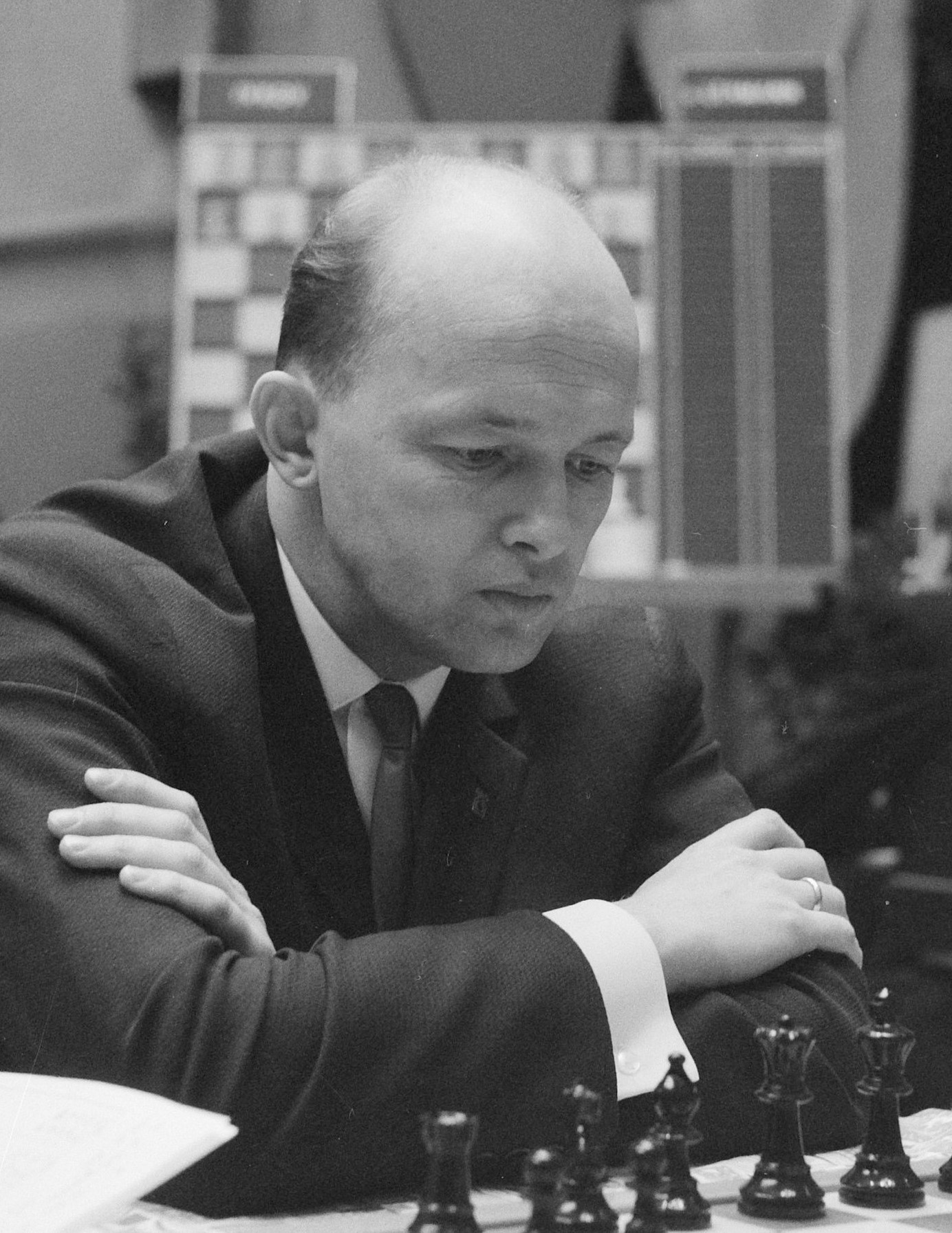
Iivo Nei won eight Estonian Chess Championship titles.

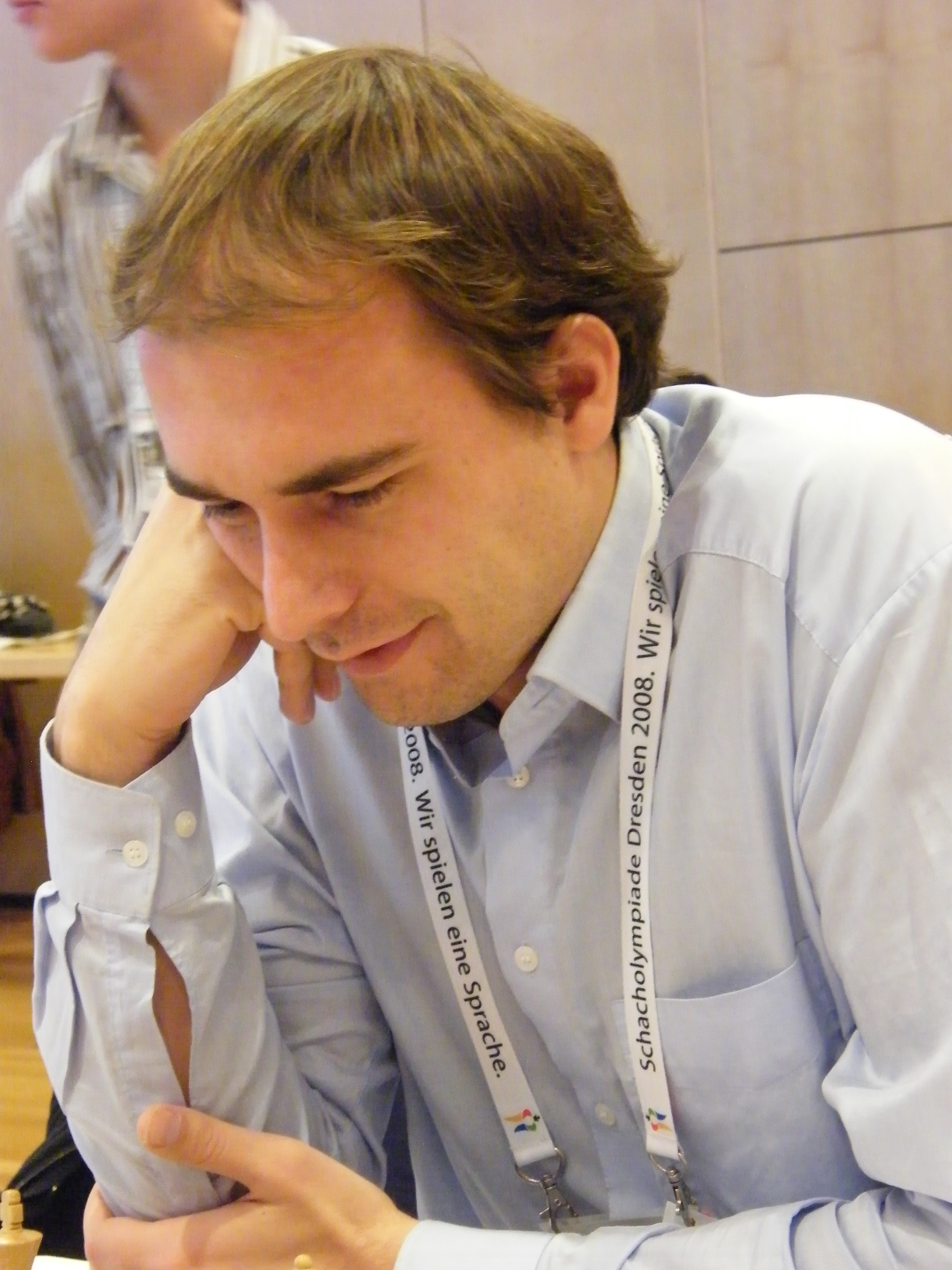
Kaido Külaots is the current chess player with ten titles.

The Estonian Chess Championship is played to determine the Estonian champion in chess.

The first unofficial championship in Estonia was held in 1903 and was organized by a chess club from Tallinn (then Reval, Russian Empire). After World War I, Estonia became independent. In 1923, the first official Estonian championship was held in Tallinn and has since been organized on an annual basis. In 1945, the first women's championship was held.

== Unofficial Championships ==
Year	City	Champion
1903	Reval	W. Sohn
1904	Reval	Bernhard Gregory
1905	Reval	Aaron Feinstein
1906	Reval	Abels
1909	Reval	Khmelevsky
1910	Reval	Aaron Feinstein

== Official Championships ==
#	Year	Host city	Men's Champion	Women's Champion
1	1923	Tallinn	Paul Rinne	
2	1925	Tallinn	Johannes Türn	
3	1930	Tallinn	Vladas Mikėnas	
4	1932	Tallinn	Leho Laurine	
5	1933	Tallinn	Gunnar Friedemann	
6	1934	Tallinn	Ilmar Raud	
7	1935	Tallinn	Paul Keres	
8	1936	Tallinn	Paul Felix Schmidt	
9	1937	Tallinn	Paul Felix Schmidt	
10	1939	Tallinn	Ilmar Raud	
11	1941	Tallinn	Johannes Türn	
12	1942	Tallinn	Paul Keres	
13	1943	Tallinn	Paul Keres	
14	1944	Viljandi	Johannes Türn and August Eller	
15	1945	Tallinn	Paul Keres	Salme Rootare
16	1946	Tallinn	Raul Renter	
17	1947	Tallinn	Jüri Randviir	
18	1948	Tallinn	Aleksander Arulaid	Salme Rootare
19	1949	Pärnu	Jüri Randviir and Raul Renter	Salme Rootare
20	1950	Tallinn	Jüri Randviir	Salme Rootare
21	1951	Tallinn	Iivo Nei	Helju Roosa
22	1952	Tartu	Iivo Nei	Marie Orav
23	1953	Tartu	Paul Keres	Urve Kure
24	1954	Tallinn	Jüri Randviir	Salme Rootare
25	1955	Tallinn	Aleksander Arulaid	Aino Kukk
26	1956	Tartu	Iivo Nei	Salme Rootare
27	1957	Tartu	Kalju Pitksaar	Salme Rootare
28	1958	Tallinn	Gunnar Uusi	Urve Kure
29	1959	Tartu	Gunnar Uusi	Marie Orav
30	1960	Viljandi	Iivo Nei	Salme Rootare
31	1961	Tallinn	Iivo Nei	Maaja Ranniku
32	1962	Tartu	Iivo Nei	Salme Rootare
33	1963	Tallinn	Gunnar Uusi	Maaja Ranniku
34	1964	Tallinn	Aleksander Arulaid	Salme Rootare
35	1965	Tartu	Rein Etruk	Urve Kure
36	1966	Viljandi	Gunnar Uusi	Salme Rootare
37	1967	Tallinn	Helmuth Luik	Maaja Ranniku
38	1968	Tartu	Aarne Hermlin	Mari Kinsigo (off contest)
39	1969	Tallinn	Rein Etruk	Salme Rootare
40	1970	Tartu	Hillar Kärner	Salme Rootare
41	1971	Tallinn	Iivo Nei	Salme Rootare
42	1972	Tartu	Andres Vooremaa	Salme Rootare
43	1973	Tallinn	Andres Vooremaa and Rein Etruk	Maaja Ranniku
44	1974	Tartu	Iivo Nei	Mari Kinsigo (off contest)
45	1975	Pärnu	Hillar Kärner	Leili Pärnpuu
46	1976	Haapsalu	Valter Heuer	Mari Kinsigo (off contest)
47	1977	Viljandi	Hillar Kärner	Tatjana Fomina
48	1978	Tallinn	Boris Rõtov	Tatjana Fomina
49	1979	Tartu	Gunnar Uusi	Leili Pärnpuu
50	1980	Tallinn	Gunnar Uusi	Leili Pärnpuu
51	1981	Haapsalu	Jaan Ludolf	Maaja Ranniku
52	1982	Tallinn	Lembit Oll	Maaja Ranniku
53	1983	Pärnu	Aleksander Veingold and Hillar Kärner	Tatjana Fomina
54	1984	Tallinn	Hillar Kärner	Maaja Ranniku
55	1985	Tallinn	Hillar Kärner	Svetlana Zainetdinova
56	1986	Tartu	Jaan Ehlvest	Leili Pärnpuu
57	1987	Haapsalu	Hillar Kärner	Maaja Ranniku
58	1988	Tallinn	Kalle Kiik	Maaja Ranniku
59	1989	Tallinn	Olav Sepp	Tatjana Fomina
60	1990	Tallinn	Mati Nei	Leili Pärnpuu
61	1991	Tallinn	Olav Sepp	Maaja Ranniku
62	1992	Tallinn	Olav Sepp	Tatjana Fomina
63	1993	Tallinn	Olav Sepp	Tuulikki Laesson
64	1994	Tallinn	Olav Sepp	Monika Tsõganova
65	1995	Tallinn	Olav Sepp	Monika Tsõganova
66	1996	Tallinn	Sergei Zjukin	Tuulikki Laesson
67	1997	Tallinn	Roman Sergejev	Monika Tsõganova
68	1998	Tallinn	Tarvo Seeman	Tatjana Fomina
69	1999	Tallinn	Kaido Külaots	Monika Tsõganova
70	2000	Tallinn	Mihhail Rõtšagov	Viktoria Baškite (off contest)
71	2001	Pühajärve	Kaido Külaots	Monika Tsõganova
72	2002	Kilingi-Nõmme	Kaido Külaots	Tatjana Fomina
73	2003	Tallinn	Kaido Külaots	Tatjana Fomina
74	2004	Tallinn	Meelis Kanep	Monika Tsõganova
75	2005	Tallinn	Meelis Kanep	Monika Tsõganova
76	2006	Tallinn	Tarvo Seeman	Valeriya Gansvind
77	2007	Tallinn	Meelis Kanep	Monika Tsõganova
78	2008	Tallinn	Kaido Külaots	Monika Tsõganova
79	2009	Rakvere	Kaido Külaots	Valeriya Gansvind
80	2010	Tartu	Kaido Külaots	Tuuli Vahtra
81	2011	Tallinn	Pavel Vorobjov	Regina Narva
82	2012	Tallinn	Mark Lapidus	Tatjana Fomina
83	2013	Tallinn	Ottomar Ladva	Tatjana Fomina
84	2014	Tallinn	Kaido Külaots	Mai Narva
85	2015	Tallinn	Ottomar Ladva	Margareth Olde
86	2016	Tallinn	Ottomar Ladva	Mai Narva
87	2017	Tallinn	Ilja Sirosh	Mai Narva
88	2018	Tallinn	Ottomar Ladva	Margareth Olde
89	2019	Tallinn	Aleksandr Volodin	Sofia Blokhin
90	2020	Tallinn	Kaido Külaots	Mai Narva
91	2021	Tallinn	Aleksandr Volodin	Anastassia Sinitsina
92	2022	Tallinn	Aleksandr Volodin	Anastassia Sinitsina
93	2023	Viljandi	Kaido Külaots	Anastassia Sinitsina
94	2024	Tallinn	Aleksandr Volodin	Margareth Olde
95	2025	Tallinn	Kirill Chukavin	Margareth Olde

1. Latvian Edvīns Ķeņģis won the championship, Külaots was the highest ranking Estonian player.

== Multiple Champions ==
=== Men's Champions ===
#	Men's Champions	Titles	Years
1	Kaido Külaots	10	1999, 2001, 2002, 2003, 2008, 2009, 2010, 2014, 2020, 2023
2	Iivo Nei	8	1951, 1952, 1956, 1960, 1961, 1962, 1971, 1974
3	Hillar Kärner	7	1970, 1975, 1977, 1983, 1984, 1985, 1987
4	Gunnar Uusi	6	1958, 1959, 1963, 1966, 1979, 1980
4	Olav Sepp	6	1989, 1991, 1992, 1993, 1994, 1995
6	Paul Keres	5	1935, 1942, 1943, 1945, 1953
7	Jüri Randviir	4	1947, 1949, 1950, 1954
7	Ottomar Ladva	4	2013, 2015, 2016, 2018
7	Aleksandr Volodin	4	2019, 2021, 2022, 2024
10	Johannes Türn	3	1925, 1941, 1944
10	Aleksander Arulaid	3	1948, 1955, 1964
10	Rein Etruk	3	1965, 1969, 1973
10	Meelis Kanep	3	2004, 2005, 2007
14	Ilmar Raud	2	1934, 1939
14	Paul Felix Schmidt	2	1936, 1937
14	Raul Renter	2	1946, 1949
14	Andres Vooremaa	2	1972, 1973
14	Tarvo Seeman	2	1998, 2006

=== Women's Champions ===
#	Women's Champions	Titles	Years
1	Salme Rootare	15	1945, 1948, 1949, 1950, 1954, 1956, 1957, 1960, 1962, 1964, 1966, 1969, 1970, 1971, 1972
2	Maaja Ranniku	10	1961, 1963, 1967, 1973, 1981, 1982, 1984, 1987, 1988, 1991
2	Tatjana Fomina	10	1977, 1978, 1983, 1989, 1992, 1998, 2002, 2003, 2012, 2013
4	Monika Tsõganova	9	1994, 1995, 1997, 1999, 2001, 2004, 2005, 2007, 2008
5	Leili Pärnpuu	5	1975, 1979, 1980, 1986, 1990
6	Mai Narva	4	2014, 2016, 2017, 2020
6	Margareth Olde	4	2015, 2018, 2024, 2025
8	Urve Kure	3	1953, 1958, 1965
8	Mari Kinsigo	3	1968, 1974, 1976
8	Anastassia Sinitsina	3	2021, 2022, 2023
11	Marie Orav	2	1952, 1959
11	Tuulikki Laesson	2	1993, 1996
11	Valeriya Gansvind	2	2006, 2009
