= Andres Vooremaa =

Estonian chess player

Personal information
- Born: July 19, 1944 Rae Parish, Estonia
- Died: December 12, 2022 (aged 78)

Chess career
- Country: Soviet Union; Estonia
- Title: Soviet Master
- Peak rating: 2415 (July 1971)
- Peak ranking: No. 235 (July 1971)

Andres Vooremaa (born 19 July 1944 - 12 December 2022) was an Estonian chess player, who twice won the Estonian Chess Championship. He was awarded the Soviet Master title in 1969.

== Biography ==
Vooremaa was born in Rae Parish. In 1968 he graduated from Tallinn Polytechnical Institute with a degree in industrial electronics. From 1971 to 1994 he worked as an engineer. In 1961 Andres Vooremaa won the Estonian Junior Chess Championship. He won the Tallinn Chess Championship in 1962, 1964 and 1970. In 1969 became a Soviet Master. In 1970 Vooremaa won the Baltic Chess Championship in Pärnu. He twice won the Estonian Chess Championship in 1972 and 1973, finished second three times (1971, 1974, 1985) and finished third once in 1980. He has played for Estonia five times in the Soviet Team Chess Championships (1963, 1972, 1975, 1979, 1981), and twice played for the Estonian team "Kalev" in the Soviet Team Chess Cup (1968, 1980). He also won the Estonian correspondence chess championship in 1968, and the Estonian blitz chess championship in 1972. He was the coach of Tatyana Fomina from 1981 to 1988.
