= Vahtra =

Family name

Vahtra is an Estonian surname relating derived from vahtralised, meaning Aceraceae. People bearing the surname Vahtra include:

- Cristel Vahtra (born 1972), Estonian cross-country skier
- Tuuli Vahtra (born 1989), Estonian chess Master
