= Viktoria Baškite =

Estonian chess player

Personal information
- Born: August 6, 1985 (age 40) Tallinn, then part of Estonian SSR, Soviet Union

Chess career
- Country: Estonia
- Title: Woman International Master (2004)
- FIDE rating: 2105 (October 2020)
- Peak rating: 2247 (January 2007)

Viktoria Bashkite (Estonian: Viktoria Baškite, Lithuanian: Viktorija Baškytė, born August 6, 1985, in Tallinn) is an Estonian chess player who holds the FIDE title of Woman International Master (WIM, 2004).

== Chess career ==
Daughter of Lithuanian father and Russian mother, Baškite is a Tallinn chess school alumni. One of her first trainers was Estonian chess master Iivo Nei. She is a four-time winner of the Estonian Junior Chess Championships from 2000 to 2003. From 1995 to 2003 she participated in the European Junior Chess Championships and the World Junior Chess Championships in different age groups. Her best result is 9th place at the European Junior Chess Championship in the group under 18 years (2002). In 2003 and 2004, she won the Open Sweden Junior Chess Championships. In 2004, she was named the best young chess player in Estonia.

In the Estonian Women's Chess Championship, she has won gold (2000), 2 silver (2001, 2006) and 3 bronze medals (2002, 2003, 2005). In 2001 Baškite won the Estonian Rapid Chess Championship.

== Team chess results ==
Baškite played for Estonia in several Chess Olympiads:

- In 2000, at first reserve board in the 34th Chess Olympiad in Istanbul (+1 −2 =3);
- In 2002, at third board in the 35th Chess Olympiad in Bled (+4 −6 =2);
- In 2004, at first board in the 36th Chess Olympiad in Calvia (+3 −4 =7);
- In 2006, at second board in the 37th Chess Olympiad in Turin (+7 −1 =3);
- In 2008, at third board in the 38th Chess Olympiad in Dresden (+6 −2 =2).

She played for Estonia in the European Team Chess Championship:

- In 2007, at fourth board in Heraklion (+4 −1 =3).

== Personal life ==
In 2003, Baškite graduated from the Russian gymnasium in Lasnamäe. In 2005, she graduated from the Tallinn University of Technology faculty of mechanics with a bachelor's degree and in 2008 she received a master's degree.
