= Tuuli =

Tuuli may refer to:

- Tuuli is a Finno-Permic word meaning "wind"

- Tuuli (name), Estonian and Finnish feminine given name
- Finnish hovercraft Tuuli
- Valmet Tuuli, Finnish aircraft

- Tuuli is a Mongolic word meaning "epic"

- Mongol epic poetry
- Epic of Jangar
- Epic of King Gesar

- Tuuli, a Canadian pop-punk band
