= August Eller =

Estonian chess player

Personal information
- Born: 1907 Viljandi, Estonia
- Died: 1990 (aged 82–83) Haapsalu, Estonia

Chess career
- Country: Estonia; Soviet Union

August Eller (1907, Viljandi – 1990, Haapsalu) was an Estonian chess player, who won the Estonian Chess Championship.

== Biography ==
August Eller participated in two Estonian schoolchildren chess championships (1925, 1926). Best result was 4th place in 1926 in Tartu. In 1938 he shared the first place in a countrywide chess tournament in Rakvere. In 1944, August Eller tied for 1st-2nd with Johannes Türn in Viljandi (14th Estonian Chess Championship). It was his greatest success in chess.

After World War II Eller imprisoned in Soviet prison camp but soon Red Army authorities realized he was freed from jail. Eller participated in postwar Estonian Chess Championships in 1949, 1950, 1951, 1952, 1953, 1954, 1955, 1956, 1958. Highest places are divided 6th-7th in 1949, and divided 4th-6th place in 1958. In 1968 August Eller played for Estonia Sports Club Jõud in 6th Soviet Team Chess Cup in Riga, where his team finished at last place. He three times won Viljandi town chess championship (1945, 1952, 1953). He worked in agriculture for many years and died in August 1990.
