= Aleksander Arulaid =

Estonian chess player

Personal information
- Born: 24 May 1924 Tallinn, Estonia
- Died: 9 July 1995 (aged 71) Tallinn, Estonia

Chess career
- Country: Estonia; Soviet Union; Estonia

Aleksander Arulaid (24 May 1924, Tallinn – 9 July 1995, Tallinn) was an Estonian chess player. He was a three-time winner of the Estonian Chess Championship.

== Biography ==
In 1941 Arulaid graduated from secondary school in Tallinn and in 1951 he graduated from Tallinn Polytechnical Institute in electrical machinery and apparatus specialty. From 1952 to 1984 he worked as an engineer in industrial projects. In 1944/45 Aleksander Arulaid ranked third in the Estonian and Latvian strongest players tournament in Riga after Paul Keres and Alexander Koblencs. After World War II he was one of the leading chess players in Estonia. In 1945 Arulaid won a tournament in Tallinn. In 1948 he was second place in Baku tournament. In Estonian Chess Championships he has won 3 gold (1948, 1955, 1964), 3 silver (1943, 1946, 1950) and 3 bronze (1944, 1959, 1960) medals. Arulaid was the winner of Tallinn Chess Championships in 1953, 1954, 1955, 1957, 1960, 1968. In 1954 and 1967 he won the traditional National Tournament in Pärnu. He played in Soviet Chess Championships semifinals three times (1949, 1955, 1964) and played for Estonia in the Soviet Team Chess Championships five times (1953, 1955, 1959, 1960, 1967).
