= Roman Sergejev =

Estonian chess player

Personal information
- Born: 15 October 1975 (age 50)

Chess career
- Country: Estonia
- Peak rating: 2321 (July 2008)

Roman Sergejev (born 15 October 1975) is an Estonian chess player, Estonian Chess Championship winner (1997).

== Chess career ==
In the second half of the 1990s, Roman Sergejev was one of the strongest young chess players in Estonia. He twice participated in World Junior Chess Championships (1994, 1995). In 1997 in Tallinn, Roman Sergejev won the Estonian Chess Championship and the following year shared 3rd place in this tournament.

Roman Sergejev played for Estonia in the European Team Chess Championship:

- In 1997, at fourth board in the 11th European Team Chess Championship in Pula (+1, =7, -1).

In recent years, he rarely participates in chess tournaments.
