= Estonian Americans =

Americans of Estonian birth or descent

Ameerika eestlased (Estonian)

Total population
- 22,802 (2021); 0.01% of the US population

Regions with significant populations
- California · New York · New Jersey · Washington · Florida · Oregon

Languages
- American English, Estonian

Religion
- Protestant (Lutheran), Deism

Related ethnic groups
- Estonian Canadians, Finnish Americans

Estonian Americans (Estonian: Ameerika eestlased) are Americans who are of Estonian ancestry, mostly descendants of people who left Estonia as refugees during World War II. According to the 2025 American Community Survey, 22,802 Americans reported full or partial Estonian ancestry, down from 26,762 in 1990.

== History ==
Estonian-American population as of the 2000 U.S. census
California	3,465
New York	2,892
New Jersey	2,331
Washington	1,401
Florida	1,393

The first recorded arrival of immigrants from Estonia (then part of Sweden) to what is now the United States occurred already in 1627 in the colony of New Sweden along the Delaware River. Emigration from Estonia started on a larger scale in the late 19th century, when Estonia was part of the former Russian Empire, and continued until the mid-20th century. However, it is difficult to estimate the number of Estonian-Americans before 1920, since they were often referred to as "Russians" in the national censuses.

The beginnings of industrialization and commercial agriculture in the Russian Empire transformed many Estonian farmers into migrants. The pressures of industrialization drove numerous Estonian farmers to emigrate to the United States until Estonia became an independent country in 1918, at the end of World War I.

During World War II, Estonia was invaded and occupied by the Soviet Union in 1940–1941, and by Nazi Germany in 1941–1944. In 1944, in the face of the country being re-occupied by the Soviet Red Army, 80,000 people fled from Estonia by sea to Germany and Sweden, becoming war refugees and later, expatriates.

Some thousand of them moved on from there and settled in the United States. After the war's end, these displaced persons were allowed to immigrate to the United States and to apply for citizenship. In 1948, the Displaced Persons Act from U.S. Congress stipulated that 40% of the available visas go to “Baltic” people (Estonians, Latvians, and Lithuanians). This act and its 1950 revision allowed 11,000 Estonians into the United States between 1948 and 1952. Some of these refugees and their descendants started returning to Estonia at the end of the 1980s.

== Notable people ==
President Franklin Delano Roosevelt descended from 17th-century Tallinner colonists in New Amsterdam.

Conductor Neeme Järvi was the music director of the Detroit Symphony Orchestra, the New Jersey Symphony Orchestra, as well as the international Gothenburg Symphony, and Het Residentie Orkest of The Hague. His three children, conductors Paavo Järvi and Kristjan Järvi, and flutist Maarika Järvi, are prominent American musicians in their own right. Paavo Järvi is the chief conductor of the Cincinnati Symphony Orchestra.

Chemist Lauri Vaska emigrated to United States in 1949. He is distinguished for his research in organometallic chemistry, winning the prestigious Boris Pregel Award. Hillar Rootare, a materials scientist, is best known for his work in the development of mercury porosimetry, high pressure liquid chromatography, and the formulation of the Rootare-Prenzlow Equation.

In journalism, Edmund S. Valtman, a successful editorial cartoonist, won the Pulitzer Prize for Editorial Cartooning.

Ene Riisna is an Estonian-born American award-winning television producer, known for her work on the American news program 20/20.

Alar Toomre is an astronomer recognized for his research on the dynamics of galaxies. The Toomre sequence and Toomre Instability are named in his honor.

In entertainment, singer and actress Miliza Korjus was nominated for an Academy Award for her performance in the 1938 film The Great Waltz.

Hollywood actor Johann Urb (born January 24, 1977) is an Estonian living and working in the United States.

Kerli Kõiv (born February 7, 1987), better known mononymously as Kerli, is an Estonian pop singer residing in the United States since 2005.

Psychologist, psychobiologist and neuroscientist Jaak Panksepp (June 5, 1943 — April 18, 2017) coined the term 'affective neuroscience', the name for the field that studies the neural mechanisms of emotion.

Mena Suvari (born February 13, 1979) is an American actress, fashion designer, and model.

Toomas Hendrik Ilves, born December 26, 1953, in Sweden but raised in New Jersey, was the President of Estonia.

== See also ==
- Estonia–United States relations
- Hyphenated American
- New York Estonian House
- European Americans
- Estonian Canadians
