= Leili Pärnpuu =

Estonian chess player (1950–2022)

Personal information
- Born: 30 January 1950 Haapsalu, then part of Estonian SSR, Soviet Union
- Died: 5 February 2022 (aged 72)

Chess career
- Country: Soviet Union; Estonia
- Title: Woman International Master (1990)
- Peak rating: 2290 (January 1998)

Leili Pärnpuu (30 January 1950 – 5 February 2022) was an Estonian chess player who won the Estonian Women's Chess Championship five times.

== Chess career ==
In the Estonian Women's Chess Championship Leili Pärnpuu won five gold medals (1975, 1979, 1980, 1986, 1990), 10 silver medals (1976-1977, 1984, 1991, 1993-1995, 2002, 2004, 2009) and six bronze medals (1978, 1988, 1996, 2000–01, 2008). She played three times for Estonia in the Soviet Team chess championship (1981, 1983, 1985).

Leili Pärnpuu played for Estonia in a number of Chess Olympiads:

- In 1994, at third board in the 31st Chess Olympiad in Moscow (+1, =6, -2);
- In 1996, at third board in the 32nd Chess Olympiad in Yerevan (+5, =3, -3);
- In 1998, at first reserve board in the 33rd Chess Olympiad in Elista (+2, =3, -1);
- In 2000, at third board in the 34th Chess Olympiad in Istanbul (+2, =7, -2);
- In 2002, at second board in the 35th Chess Olympiad in Bled (+6, =7, -0) - 2nd place;
- In 2004, at second board in the 36th Chess Olympiad in Calvia (+5, =5, -3);
- In 2006, at first reserve board in the 37th Chess Olympiad in Turin (+2, =3, -2);
- In 2008, at fourth board in the 38th Chess Olympiad in Dresden (+1, =2, -3);
- In 2010, at third board in the 39th Chess Olympiad in Khanty-Mansiysk (+3, =3, -2).

== Personal life ==
By profession Leili Pärnpuu was an economist. In the 1990s she worked in the Police and Border Guard Board of the Republic of Estonia.
