= Sergei Zjukin =

Estonian chess player

Personal information
- Born: 19 January 1972 (age 54) Tallinn, then part of Estonian SSR, Soviet Union

Chess career
- Country: Soviet Union; Estonia
- Title: International Master (2000)
- FIDE rating: 2279 (August 2021)
- Peak rating: 2425 (July 1997)

Sergei Zjukin (born 19 January 1972 in Tallinn) is an Estonian chess player who won the Estonian Chess Championship. He received the FIDE title of International Master (IM) in 2000.

== Biography ==
In 1989, Zjukin graduated from secondary school in Tallinn and in 2001 he graduated from Tallinn University of Technology with degree a Chemical and Materials Technology. Tallinn chess school alumnus. For four consecutive years (1987–90) Zjukin won the Estonian championships among schoolchildren. He won the Estonian Chess Championship in 1996 and finished third in 2000.

He played for Estonia in the Chess Olympiads:

- In 1996, at reserve board in the 32nd Chess Olympiad in Yerevan (+2 −1 =5);
- In 2000, at second reserve board in the 34th Chess Olympiad in Istanbul (+3 −0 =6).

Since 2004, Zjukin has been working as a chess coach in Tallinn's Tõnu Truus chess club and the Lasnamäe Noorte chess club.

== FIDE ratings ==
Elo development
View chart definition.
