= Rein Etruk =

Estonian chess player (1938–2012)

- Full name: Rein-Toomas Etruk
- Country: Estonia
- Born: March 22, 1938; Tallinn, Estonia
- Died: November 11, 2012 (aged 74); Tallinn, Estonia

Rein-Toomas Etruk (March 22, 1938 – November 11, 2012) was an Estonian chess player who three times won the Estonian Chess Championship.

== Biography ==
In 1954 and 1955, Etruk won the Estonian Junior chess championship. Etruk played for Estonia in various Soviet Team Chess Championships. He finished with the highest score on his board in 1958 and 1967 but in 1962, came third. Etruk won nine medals in the Estonian Chess Championship: three gold (1965, 1969, 1973), three silver (1964, 1966, 1970) and three bronze (1962, 1967, 1968). In 1974 and 1990, he won the Estonian Blitz Chess Championship. In 1971, Etruk finished sixth in the Pärnu tournament, which was won by Leonid Stein, ahead of Mikhail Tal, Paul Keres and David Bronstein.

Etruk was a graduate of the faculty of philology of the University of Tartu.
