= Anastassia Sinitsina =

Estonian chess player (born 2004)

Personal information
- Born: 2004 (age 21–22)

Chess career
- Country: Estonia; Russia
- Title: Woman International Master (2024)
- Peak rating: 2238 (April 2024)

Anastassia Sinitsina (Анастасия Сергеевна Синицына; born 2004) is a Russian chess player who previously represented Estonia, Woman International Master (2024). In 2021, 2022 and 2023 she won the Estonian Women Chess Championship.

== Biography ==
From the mid-2010s, Anastassia Sinitsina was one of the leading young chess players in Estonia.

In 2014, she won bronze medal in European Youth Chess Championship in girls U10 age group. Also in this year she won European Youth Chess Championship in rapid and blitz chess in girls U10 age groups.

In 2016 Anastassia Sinitsina won bronze medal in Estonian Women's Chess Championship after play-off tournament. In April 2017, in Riga she participated in the 2017 Women's European Individual Chess Championship.

In 2018 Anastassia Sinitsina won Estonian Girls U14 Chess Championship and Estonian Youth U16 Chess Championship.

In 2021, she won Estonian Women's Chess Championship. In 2022 she won Estonian Women's Chess Championship. In 2023 she won Estonian Women's Chess Championship and silver medal in Estonian Chess Championship.

In August 2023, Anastassia Sinitsina was the best among women in the "Riga Technical University Open" tournament "A".

Anastassia Sinitsina played for Estonia in Chess Olympiad:

- In 2022, at third board in the 44th Chess Olympiad (women) in Chennai (+6, =2, -2).

Since August 2025, she has represented Russia in chess tournaments.
