= Paul Rinne =

Estonian chess player

Paul Rinne (6 July 1889 in Narva – 1946 Hoyerswerda) was an Estonian chess player.

He won the first Estonian Championship at Tallinn 1923. He twice took second place, behind Johannes Türn, at Tallinn 1925 (second Estonian championship), and behind Leho Laurine (Leo Laurentius) at Tallinn 1932 (fourth Estonian championship).

After the World War II, Rinne was held as a prisoner of war by the Soviets. He died of shigellosis in 1946, while in a prisoner camp in Hoyerswerda, East Germany. His death date remains unknown.
