= Tarvo Seeman =

Estonian chess player (born 1969)

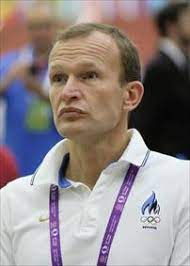

Personal information
- Born: 17 September 1969 (age 56) Vändra, Estonia

Chess career
- Country: Soviet Union; Estonia
- Title: International Master (1998)
- Peak rating: 2475 (July 1998)

Tarvo Seeman (born 17 September 1969) is an Estonian chess player who twice won the Estonian Chess Championship. He received the FIDE title of International Master (IM) in 1998. He was born in Vändra.

== Chess career ==
The first big success – 2nd place in the Estonian Junior Chess Championship in 1986. In the Estonian Chess Championships won two gold medals (1998, 2006) and three bronze medals (2001, 2009, 2014). Three-time champion of Estonia in rapid chess (2000, 2002, 2009).

Tarvo Seeman played for Estonia in Chess Olympiads:

- In 1998, at reserve board in the 33rd Chess Olympiad in Elista (+2, =2, −4);
- In 2004, at second reserve board in the 36th Chess Olympiad in Calvia (+2, =3, −3);
- In 2006, at reserve board in the 37th Chess Olympiad in Turin (+3, =2, −2);
- In 2010, at reserve board in the 39th Chess Olympiad in Khanty-Mansiysk (+1, =2, −1);
- In 2014, at second board in the 41st Chess Olympiad in Tromsø (+9, =1, −1);
- In 2016, at third board in the 42nd Chess Olympiad in Baku (+3, =2, −3).

Tarvo Seeman played for Estonia in European Team Chess Championship:

- In 2003, at third board in Plovdiv (+1, =2, −4);
- In 2004, at fourth board in Gothenburg (+2, =4, −3).
