= Vidrik Rootare =

Estonian chess player (1906–1981)

Personal information
- Born: August 20, 1906 Tallinn, Estonia
- Died: March 5, 1981 (aged 74)

Chess career
- Country: Estonia

Vidrik "Frits" Rootare (born in Tallinn, Estonia August 20, 1906 – March 5, 1981) was an Estonian chess player. His wife, Salme Rootare, was also an Estonian chess player, 15-time Estonian Champion and a Women's International Master (WIM).

In 1942, in one of his best showings, he came in third in an Estonian Chess Championship behind Johannes Türn, in second place, and Paul Keres, in first. In the 1930s, he played in the Estonian Club championships. In 1930 his team won the silver medal, with Leho Laurine, Nedsvedski, and Karring. Frits, as Vidrik was known—short for Friedrich, the German spelling of his name that he used prior to Estonian independence after World War I, was a contemporary and friend of Estonian chess players Paul Keres.

== Notable chess games ==
- Keres v. Rootare, Tallinn, Est ch 1942
- Rootare v. Keres, Tallinn, Est ch 1943
- Keres v. Rootare, Tallinn, Est ch 1945
