= Mati Nei =

Estonian chess player

Personal information
- Born: 11 October 1942 (age 83)

Chess career
- Country: Soviet Union; Estonia
- Peak rating: 2364 (July 2001)

Mati Nei (born 11 October 1942) is an Estonian chess player, Estonian Chess Championship winner (1990).

== Chess career ==
Mati Nei is the younger brother of the Estonian chess grandmaster Iivo Nei (1931–2026). He is not as successful in chess as his brother was, but in 1990 in Tallinn, Mati Nei won the Estonian Chess Championship, which was held according to the Swiss system.
