= Aarne Hermlin =

Estonian chess player

Personal information
- Born: June 6, 1940 Võru, Estonia
- Died: November 17, 2007 (aged 67) Salo, Finland

Chess career
- Country: Soviet Union; Estonia
- Title: FIDE Master (1992)
- Peak rating: 2375 (January 1980)

Aarne Hermlin (6 June 1940 in Võru, Estonia – 17 November 2007 in Salo) was an Estonian chess player who won the Estonian Chess Championship. He was awarded the title of International Correspondence Chess Master in 1986 and of FIDE Master in 1992.

== Biography ==
In 1958, Aarne Hermlin graduated from secondary school in Jõgeva. He started playing chess under the influence of his father Kaarel Hermlin (1905-1960), who was a chess coach in Jõgeva. In 1956 and 1957 Aarne Hermlin twice won Estonian junior chess championship. In 1968 he shared 2nd place in the Baltic Chess Championship. In 1975 he shared 1st place with Viktor Kupreichik at a strong chess tournament in Pärnu. He won the gold medal at the Estonian Chess Championships in 1968, silver in 1981 and bronze twice, in 1965 and 1984. He was also an active correspondence chess player, becoming an ICCF International Master. He died during a chess tournament in Finland in 2007.
