= Hillar Kärner =

Estonian chess player

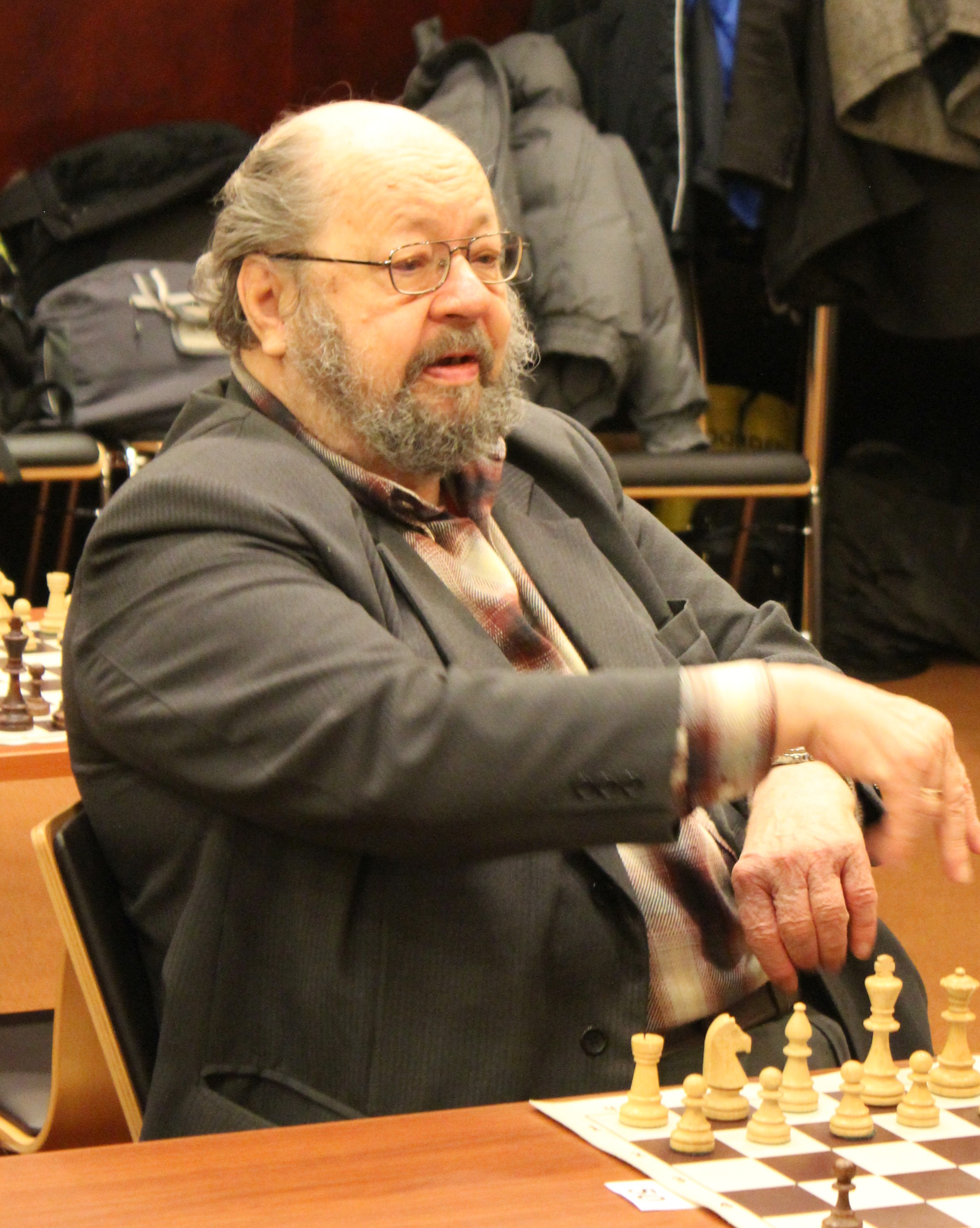
- Kärner in 2013

Personal information
- Born: 27 July 1935 Tallinn, Estonia
- Died: 19 February 2017 (aged 81)

Chess career
- Country: Estonia; Soviet Union
- Title: International Master (1980)
- Peak rating: 2425 (January 1978)

Hillar Kärner (27 July 1935 – 19 February 2017) was an Estonian chess player who won the Estonian Chess Championship seven times. He received the FIDE title of International Master (IM) in 1980.

== Biography ==
Kärner was born in Tallinn, Estonia. In 1953 Hillar Kärner graduated from the secondary school in Tallinn. In 1951 he won Estonian school children chess championship. Twice won Estonian rural sports associations chess championships (1965, 1966). In 1964 became a Soviet Master and in 1980 was fulfilled FIDE International Master norm in chess tournament in Bulgaria. In 1980 shared 1st place in Riga Cup. In Estonian Chess Championships he has won 7 gold (1970, 1975, 1977, 1983–85, 1987), 3 silver (1968, 1979, 1988) and bronze (1978) medals. Nine times Kärner played for Estonia in Soviet Team Chess Championships (1962-1967, 1972–1985) and once played for Estonian team «Jõud» in Soviet Team Chess Cup (1968). From 1973 to 1989 participated in the traditional international chess tournaments in Tallinn. The best place is shared 7th - 10th (1977). Since the 1960s, Kärner worked in Tallinn's Excavator factory, later the rural project institute «EKE Projekt» and Paul Keres House of Chess. Kärner is the author of book - «Kuus aastakümmet Caissa lummuses» («Six decades under the spell of Caissa»), Published by Argo, Tallinn, 2012, (ISBN 9789949466580).

== Notable games ==
- Hillar Karner vs Paul Keres Tallinn 1967 Victory over Estonia's all-times strongest chess player.
- Mikhail Tal vs Hillar Karner Piarnu 1971 Victory over World ex-champion.
- Hillar Karner vs Anatoly Karpov Moscow 1972 Victory over next World champion.
- Hillar Karner vs Mikhail Tal Tallinn 1983 Another victory over World ex-champion.
