= Raul Renter =

Estonian economist and chess player (1920–1992)

Personal information
- Born: 1 August 1920 Tallinn, Estonia
- Died: 20 November 1992 (aged 72) Tallinn, Estonia

Chess career
- Country: Estonia; Soviet Union; Estonia

Raul Renter (1 August 1920 – 20 November 1992) was an Estonian economist and chess player, who twice won the Estonian Chess Championship.

== Early life and education ==
Renter was born 1 August 1920 in Tallinn, Estonia. In 1938 he graduated from Tallinn French Lyceum. In 1948 graduated from Faculty of Economics in Tallinn Polytechnical Institute. In 1964 Renter defended Candidate of Economic Sciences degree, and in 1975 he presented his doctoral dissertation in Economics. The main subject of his research was economic forecasting.

== Career ==
From 1957 to 1965 worked as deputy chief of the Department of Economics at the Council of Ministers of the Estonian SSR. From 1965 to 1978 he was director of the laboratory in the Estonian Academy of Sciences Institute of Economics. From 1978 to 1992 he was head of the Department in Institute of Economic Management.

Since the late 1930s, Raul Renter was a participant of the chess competition in Estonia. In Estonian Chess Championships he has won 2 gold (1946, 1949), silver (1945) and 3 bronze (1943, 1947, 1952) medals. In 1950 he won the traditional National Tournament in Pärnu. In 1955 he was a co-author of the chess textbook in the Estonian language - «Maleõpik».

== Death ==
Renter died on 20 November 1992 in Tallinn.
