= Monika Tsõganova =

Estonian chess player (born 1969)

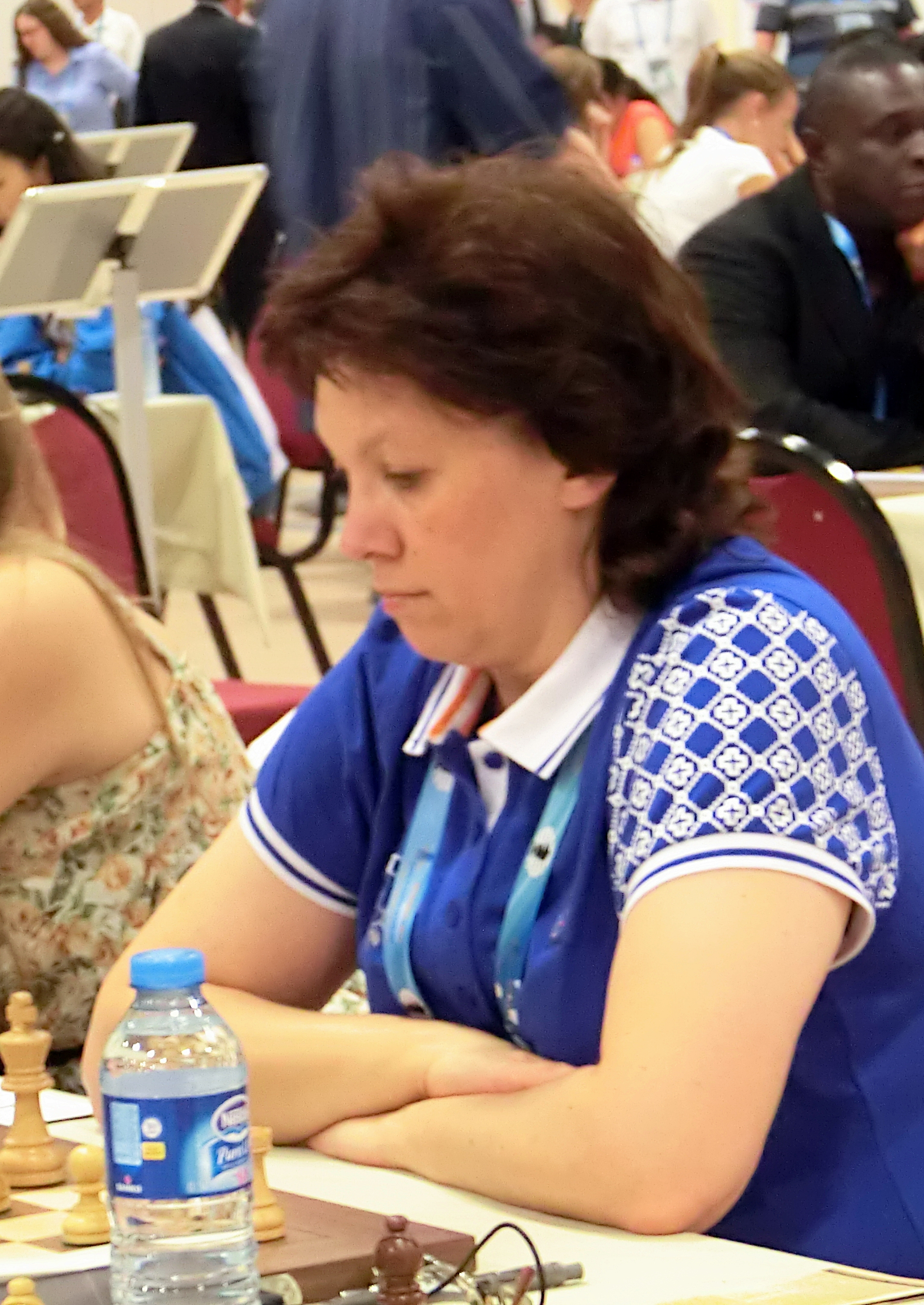
- Tsõganova in 2012

Personal information
- Born: August 8, 1969 (age 56) Kohtla-Järve, then part of Estonian SSR, Soviet Union

Chess career
- Country: Soviet Union; Estonia
- Title: Woman International Master (1991)
- Peak rating: 2335 (July 1998)

Monika Tsõganova (born August 8, 1969, in Kohtla-Järve) is an Estonian chess Woman International Master (1991). She was the Estonian rapid chess champion six times.

== Chess career ==
Monika Tsõganova learned to play chess at age eleven. In 1987 she graduated from Tallinn boarding sports school. In 1984, 1985 and 1987 Monika Tsõganova won the Estonian Junior Chess Championships. In 1990 and 1991 Monika Tsõganova participated in USSR Women's Chess Championships. In Estonian Women's Chess Championship has won 9 gold (1994, 1995, 1997, 1999, 2001, 2004, 2005, 2007, 2008), 6 silver (1990, 1992, 1996, 2003, 2014, 2015) and 3 bronze medals (1998, 2006, 2024). Monika Tsõganova had 6 titles of Estonian rapid chess champion (1994–97, 2002, 2006).

== Team chess results ==
Monika Tsõganova played for Estonia in Chess Olympiads:

- In 1992, at second board in the 30th Chess Olympiad in Manila (+5 −3 =4);
- In 1994, at first board in the 31st Chess Olympiad in Moscow (+5 −2 =5);
- In 1998, at first board in the 33rd Chess Olympiad in Elista (+3 −4 =5);
- In 2000, at first board in the 34th Chess Olympiad in Istanbul (+4 −5 =3);
- In 2006, at first board in the 37th Chess Olympiad in Turin (+4 −6 =0);
- In 2008, at first board in the 38th Chess Olympiad in Dresden (+2 −6 =1);
- In 2012, at first board in the 40th Chess Olympiad in Istanbul (+5 −4 =1);
- In 2014, at second board in the 41st Chess Olympiad in Tromsø (+5 −4 =1);
- In 2016, at second board in the 42nd Chess Olympiad in Baku (+3 −2 =5);
- In 2018, at third board in the 43rd Chess Olympiad in Batumi (+2 −3 =4).

Monika Tsõganova played for Estonia in European Team Chess Championship:

- In 1992, at second board in Debrecen (+5 −2 =2);
- In 2007, at first board in Heraklion (+1 −3 =4).

== Personal life ==
From 1987 to 1991 Monika Tsõganova studied in Tallinn University of Technology. From 1991 she worked as chess trainer in Tallinn chess school and Paul Keres chess house (1991–2003), Kaido Külaots chess school (2005–2009), chess academy "Vabaettur" (from 2009). She is FIDE Trainer (2005). Mother of three children.
