= Hillar Rootare =

Estonian chemist

Hillar Muidar Rootare (26 April 1928 – 2 October 2008) was an Estonian-American physical chemist and materials scientist best known for his work in the development of mercury porosimetry, high pressure liquid chromatography, and formulation of the Rootare-Prenzlow Equation.

== Biography ==
Rootare was born and raised in Tallinn, Estonia, emigrated from Estonia to Helsinki, Finland, in 1944, and later to Visby, on the Swedish island of Gotland, and immigrated to New York City in the United States from Sweden in 1946. He attended Jersey City Junior College and Wagner College on Staten Island, New York, and received his Ph.D. from the University of Michigan in 1973. He was displaced several times during and after World War II, and as a result he spoke several languages, including English, Estonian, Finnish, Swedish, as well as, to a lesser degree, German and Russian. Hillar Rootare was the nephew of Estonian chess player Vidrik Rootare, several of whose games against the world-renowned International Grand Master Paul Keres are published among Keres's most interesting games, and of Salme Rootare, a Women's International Master in chess, and 15-time Estonian women's chess champion, who once finished third in the world chess championship competition (1959). Hillar's middle name, Muidar, is radium spelled backwards—he was given the name because his father, Karl Johannes Rootare, also a chemist, was conducting some early experiments with radium and other radioactive materials around the time Hillar was born in 1928. Hillar's mother, Karin (Kangas) Rootare, was born in Narva, Estonia, and is of Ingrian-Finnish as well as Estonian descent. Rootare and Carl Prenzlow came up with the Rootare-Prenzlow Equation while in graduate school at the University of Michigan, in typical Estonian fashion over a late-night beer after working in the laboratory, working it out on cocktail napkins at Metzger's bar in Ann Arbor. Hillar, a former faculty member of the University of Michigan as well as a former student, was also a former president of the American Fine Particle Society (physics). He was an officer in the United States Air Force, and served in the Korean War as a navigator aboard a B-17 converted for reconnaissance. He married Norene (Kindstrand) Rootare since 1959. They live in Atlanta, Georgia, in the United States, and have six children, Laura, Paul, Niel, Eva Marie, Lennart, and Margrethe. They also have relatives in Sweden and Estonia.

== Publications ==
Rootare is highly regarded in several areas, having published more than 100 papers and cited in hundreds more, but particularly so in the field of porosimetry, where he considered one of the foremost experts, and is one of the most widely published chemists in the United States. Examples of his published papers include:

- Solubility-Product Phenomena in Hydroxyapatite-Water Systems, H.M. Rootare, V.R. Deitz, & F.G. Carpenter, 17 Journal of Colloid Science p. 179 (1962).
- Surface Areas from Mercury Porosimetry Measurements, Rootare, H.M., and Prenzlow, C.F., 71 Journal of Physical Chemistry p. 2733 (1967).
- A Review of Mercury Porosimetry, H.M. Rootare, 5 Perspectives in Powder Metallurgy 225, Advanced Experimental Techniques in Powder Metallurgy, Plenum Press (New York, London 1970).
- A Computer Program for Pore Volume and Pore Area Distribution, Rootare & Spencer, 6 Powder Technology, p. 17 (1972)
- Characterization of the Compaction and Sintering of Hydroxyapatite Powders by Mercury Porosimetry, H.M. Rootare, R.G. Craig, 9 Powder Technology p. 199 (1974).
- Thermal Analysis of Experimental and Commercial Gutta-Percha, H.M. Rootare, J.M. Powers, & R.L. Smith, 2 J. Endod. p. 244 (Aug. 1976).
- Vapor Phase Adsorption of Water on Hydroxyapatite, H.M. Rootare, R.G. Craig, 56 J. Dent Res. p. 1437 (Dec. 1977).
- Preparation of Ag/AgCl Electrodes, H.M. Rootare & J.M. Powers, 11 Journal of Biomedical Materials Research p. 633 (1977)
- Free Surface Energy Change for Water Adsorbed on Hydroxyapatite, H.M. Rootare, R.G. Craig, 56 J. Dent Res. p. 744 (Jul. 1977).
- Determination of Phase Transitions in Gutta-Percha by Differential Thermal Analysis, H.M. Rootare & J.M. Powers, 56 J. Dent. Res. 1453 (Dec. 1977).
- Sintered Hydroxyapatite Ceramic for Wear studies, H.M. Rootare, J.M. Powers, and R.G. Craig, 57 J. Dent. Res. p. 777 (1978).
- Characterization of Hydroxyapatite Powders and Compacts at Room Temperature and After Sintering at 1200 Degrees C., H.M. Rootare, R.G. Craig, 5 J. Or. Reh. p. 293 (1978).
- Wear of Composites by Abrasives of Varying Hardness, H.M. Rootare, J.M. Powers, and R.G. Craig, 58 J. Dent Res. p. 1097 (Mar. 1979).
