= Jaan Ludolf =

Estonian chess player

Personal information
- Born: 14 March 1940 (age 86)

Chess career
- Country: Estonia; Soviet Union; Estonia

Jaan Ludolf (also Jaan Ludolph; born 14 March 1940) is an Estonian chess player, Estonian Chess Championship winner (1981).

== Chess career ==
In 1958 Ludolf won Estonian Youth Chess Championship, and in 1960 he won Estonian Correspondence Chess Championship. In 1962, he played for Estonia in 8th Soviet Team Chess Championship at sixth board. Ludolf took part in the finals of the Estonian Chess Championship several times and in 1961 in Tallinn he shared 3rd place but 1981 in Haapsalu became the winner of this tournament.

Ludolf studied at the Faculty of Mechanics at Tallinn Polytechnic Institute but did not graduate.
