= Mari Kinsigo =

Estonian chess player

Personal information
- Born: 12 July 1946 Viljandi, then part of Estonian SSR, Soviet Union
- Died: 10 May 2014 (aged 67)

Chess career
- Country: Soviet Union; Estonia
- Title: Woman FIDE Master (1993)
- FIDE rating: 2185 (July 1998)
- Peak rating: 2020 (July 1983)

Mari Kinsigo (née Sammul; 12 July 1946 – 10 May 2014), was an Estonian chess player who received the title of Woman FIDE Master (WFM) in 1993.

== Biography ==
In 1964, she graduated from secondary school in Viljandi. Her first chess coach was her father. Three times she won the Estonian Junior Chess Championships (1962, 1963, 1964). During the period from 1967 to 1974 she regularly participated in USSR Women's Chess Championships, where the best result was shared fourth through sixth place in 1970. In 1981 she won the international tournament in the Albena (Bulgaria). In Estonian Women's Chess Championship Mari Kinsigo has won three gold (1968, 1974, 1976), five silver (1967, 1969, 1972, 1978, 1982) and two bronze (1965, 1973) medals. Mari Kinsigo four times played for Estonia in the Soviet Team Chess Championships (1962, 1967, 1972, 1975). During the 37 years (1968-2005) she worked as a coach in Tallinn's chess school.

Kinsigo died on 10 May 2014 after a serious illness. She was buried at Pärnamäe cemetery in Tallinn on 17 May.
