= Jüri Randviir =

Estonian chess player and journalist

Personal information
- Born: 27 May 1927 Tallinn, Estonia
- Died: 8 August 1996 (aged 69) Tallinn, Estonia

Chess career
- Country: Soviet Union; Estonia

Jüri Randviir (27 May 1927, Tallinn – 8 August 1996, Tallinn) was an Estonian chess player and journalist, who four times won the Estonian Chess Championship.

== Biography ==
Jüri Randviir learned to play chess at age ten in Tartu, where he spent his school years. After World War II he was one of the leading chess players in Estonia. In Estonian Chess Championships he has won 4 gold (1947, 1949, 1950, 1954), silver (1957) and 2 bronze (1948, 1955) medals. In 1955 he was second in the traditional National Tournament in Pärnu (won Paul Keres) and became a Soviet Master. Five times Jüri Randviir played for Estonia in Soviet Team Chess Championships (1953-1960).

Made a great contribution to the popularization of chess in Estonia. As a freelance journalist worked with major Estonian newspapers and made radio and television programs about chess. Author of 11 chess books, including books about seven international tournaments in Tallinn (1975-1987). Jüri Randviir was also a composer of almost 1000 chess problems and study. Since 1956 Jüri Randviir has given a large number of simultaneous exhibitions in which played approximately 2756 games (+2327 -131 =298).
