= Gunnar Uusi =

Estonian chess player

Personal information
- Born: June 23, 1931 Haapsalu, Estonia
- Died: August 7, 1981 (aged 50) Tartu, then part of Estonian SSR, Soviet Union

Gunnar Uusi (June 23, 1931 – August 7, 1981) was an Estonian chess player who won the Estonian Chess Championship six times.

== Biography ==
Gunnar Uusi was born June 23, 1931, in Haapsalu, Estonia.

In 1950, while still at school, Gunnar Uusi competed in his first Estonian championship, finishing in equal fourth place. In 1951 he graduated from Võru secondary school, and then studied at Moscow State University of Economics, Statistics, and Informatics. During his studies he actively participated in several chess competitions. In 1953 he represented Moscow at the USSR team championship and finished in fifth place at the USSR Chess Championship semi-final in Vilnius. In 1954 he finished equal sixth in the Moscow Chess Championship and was awarded the title of Master of Sport. After completing his studies in 1956 he returned to Estonia and worked in a Tartu agricultural machinery plant as an economist, later becoming a director (1966–1972). In the 1957 Estonian Chess Championship Uusi finished in third place. He won the Estonian championships six times, in 1958, 1959, 1963, 1966, 1979, and 1980. Three times he finished second, in 1960, 1961, and 1972. In 1973 he won the Pärnu summer chess tournaments. In his later years he worked at the Tartu chess club. One of Uusi's last tournaments was the International Paul Keres Memorial in 1981. Tartu now regularly hosts the Gunnar Uusi memorial tournament for young chess players.

He died August 7, 1981, in Tartu, Estonia at the age of 50.
