= Olav Sepp =

Estonian chess player

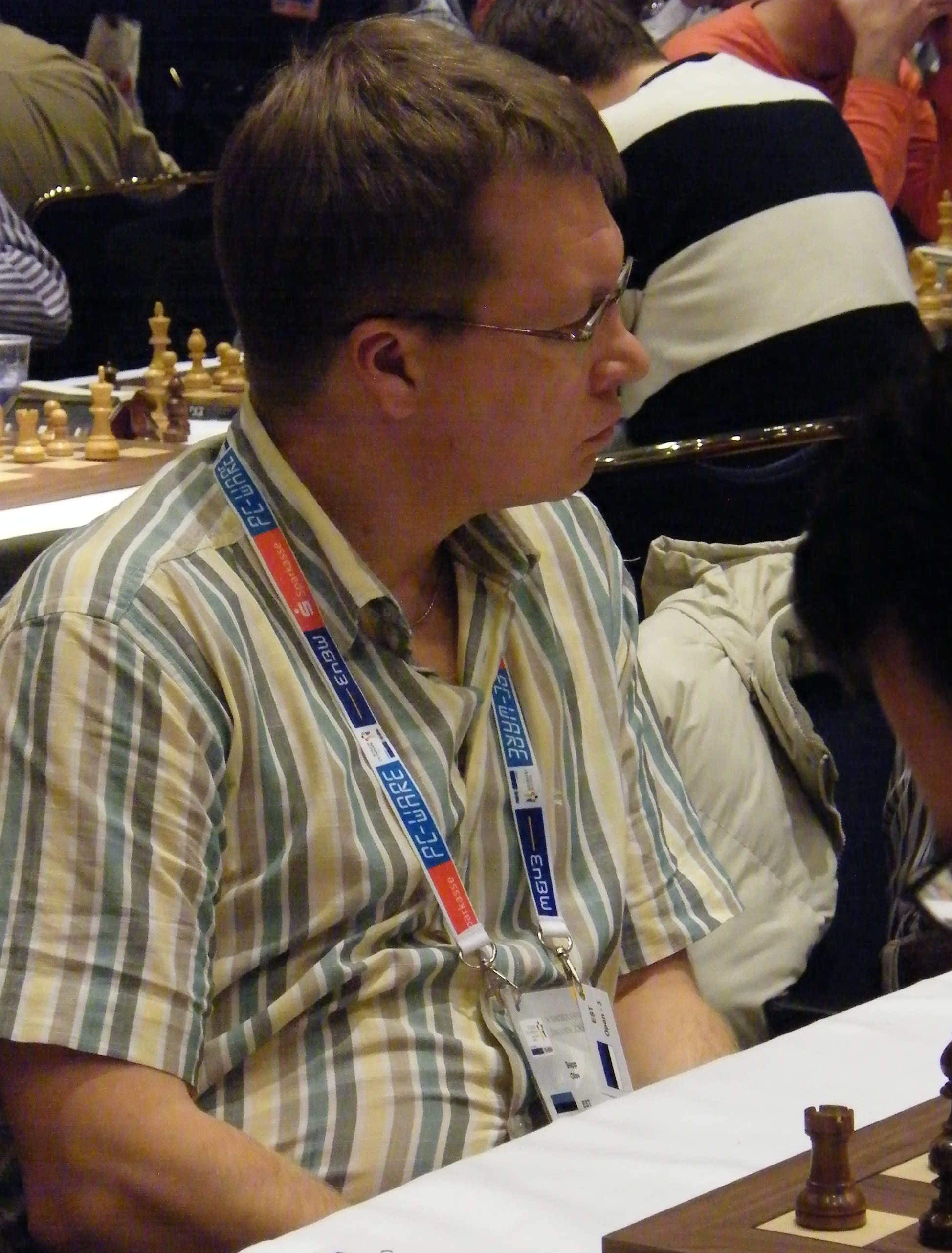
Olav Sepp in 2008.

Olav Sepp (born 5 May 1969 in Tallinn) is an Estonian chess player and six-time champion of Estonia (1989, 1991–1995). Sepp also has several other top three finishes in the Estonian championship: 2nd in 1997, 3rd in 1998, 2nd in 1999 and 2000, 3rd in 2001, 3rd in 2005 (tied for 2nd but lost on tie-break), and 2nd in 2006 (tied for 1st but lost on tie-break). He has represented Estonia in the Chess Olympiads six times: 1992, 1994, 1996, 2000, 2004, and 2006.

He received the chess titles of International Master in 1994 and International Correspondence Chess Master in 2018.
