= Aleksander Veingold =

Estonian chess player

Personal information
- Born: 10 October 1953 (age 72) Tapa, Estonia

Chess career
- Country: Soviet Union; Estonia
- Title: International Master (1983)
- FIDE rating: 2462 (July 2026)

Aleksander Veingold (born 10 October 1953, in Tapa, Estonia) is an Estonian chess player, who won the Estonian Chess Championship. He was awarded the Soviet Master title in 1975 and International Master title in 1983.

== Biography ==
In 1976 Aleksander Veingold graduated from Tallinn University with a degree in theoretical physics. In 2005 he graduated from University of Tartu as Doctor of Philosophy in practical philosophy.

In 1969 Veingold won the Estonian Junior Chess Championship. In 1979 he won National tournament in Tallinn and shared 5th place in Paul Keres Memorial Tournament.

In 1980 Veingold shared 1st place in Riga Cup. He won the Estonian Chess Championship in 1983, four times finished second (1978, 1980, 1984, 1998) and six times finished third (1975, 1977, 1979, 1982, 1999, 2004).

Aleksander Veingold played for Estonia fourth times in the Soviet Team Chess Championships (1972, 1979–1983). Aleksander Veingold played for Estonia in Chess Olympiads:

- In 1992, at third board in the 30th Chess Olympiad in Manila (+3 −5 =3);
- In 1994, at reserve board in the 31st Chess Olympiad in Moscow (+1 −2 =1);
- In 1998, at fourth board in the 33rd Chess Olympiad in Elista (+2 −1 =6);
- In 2002, at fourth board in the 35th Chess Olympiad in Bled (+2 −4 =2);
- In 2004, at third board in the 36th Chess Olympiad in Calvia (+4 −2 =4).

In 1981 Veingold was Maia Chiburdanidze secundant in Women's World Chess Championship Match. He was the coach of Jaan Ehlvest from 1986 to 1990.

He has FIDE Chess Coach professional level IV (2006). From 1998 to 2002 Veingold was a member in FIDE subcommittee "Chess in schools" and Development Committee of FIDE. He is "Vabaettur" Chess Academy head trainer.
