= Paikuse =

Borough in Estonia

- Borough
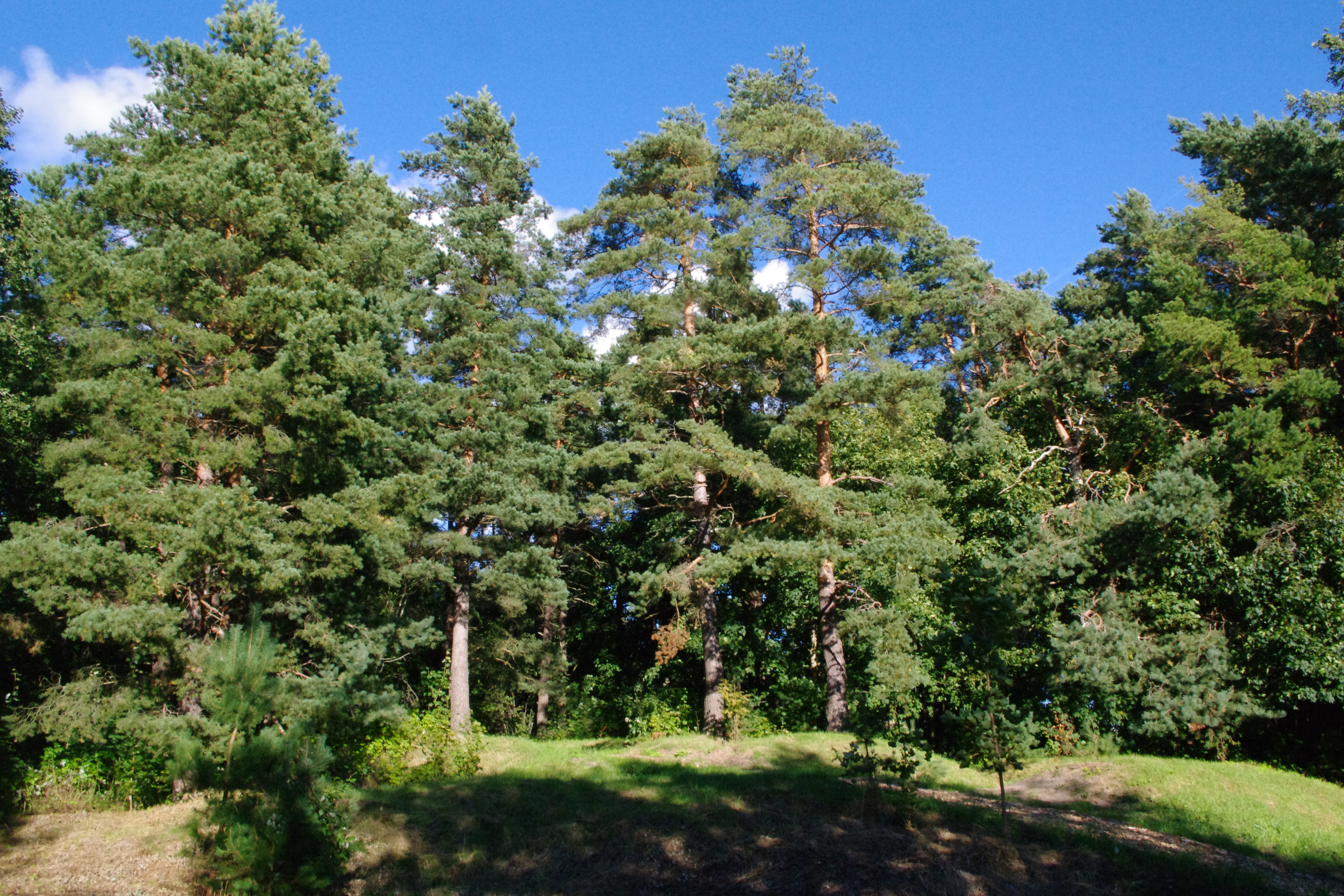
- Sindi-Lodja stone age settlement in Paikuse

- Location in Estonia
- Coordinates: 58°22′31″N 24°37′22″E
- Country: Estonia
- County: Pärnu County
- Municipality: Pärnu

Population (2011 Census)
  - Total: 2,375

Paikuse is a borough (Estonian: alev) in Pärnu municipality, Pärnu County, southwestern Estonia. As of the 2011 census, the settlement's population was 2,375.

Paikuse is the birthplace of chess player Helmuth Luik (1928-2009).
