= Sofia Blokhin =

Estonian chess player (born 2006)

Personal information
- Born: 27 March 2006 (age 20)

Chess career
- Country: Estonia
- Title: Woman FIDE Master (2022)
- Peak rating: 2133 (March 2026)

Sofia Blokhin (born 27 March 2006) is an Estonian chess player who holds the title of Woman FIDE Master. She is the former World Rapid Champion in the G18 age group, as well as the two-time European Rapid Champion in the G16 and G18 categories. In 2019, she won the Estonian Women Chess Championship.

== Biography ==
Sofia Blokhin twice in row won Estonian Girls Chess Championships in U18 age group. In 2022 she won two bronze medals in World Youth Rapid and Blitz Chess Championships among U16 age group girls. In 2021 she won European G16 Rapid Championship. In 2023, she won European Youth Rapid Championship in girls U18 age group and finished 2nd in the European G18 Blitz Championship.

In the 2019 Estonian Chess Championship, she was the best among women and became the Estonian Women's Chess Champion.

In 2021, 2022 and 2025 she won silver medal in Estonian Women Chess Championships.

In 2024, 2025 and 2026 she won Estonian Women's Blitz Championship and Estonian U20 Girls Chess Championship.

Sofia Blokhin played for Estonia in the Women's Chess Olympiads:

- In 2022, at reserve board in the 44th Chess Olympiad (women) in Chennai (+3, =5, -1),
- In 2024, at third board in the 45th Chess Olympiad (women) in Budapest (+5, =1, -3).

Sofia Blokhin played for Estonia in the European Women's Team Chess Championships:

- In 2023, at reserve board in the 15th European Team Chess Championship (women) in Budva (+2, =0, -2).
