= Helmuth Luik =

Estonian chess player

Personal information
- Born: 19 February 1928 Paikuse, Pärnu County, Estonia
- Died: 5 May 2009 (aged 81) Tallinn, Estonia

Chess career
- Country: Estonia; Soviet Union; Estonia

Helmuth Luik (19 February 1928, Paikuse, Pärnu County, Estonia – 5 May 2009, Tallinn) was an Estonian chess player, who won the Estonian Chess Championship.

== Biography ==
In 1949, Helmuth Luik graduated from the Tallinn College of Physical Education. After graduation, he worked as a chess coach and arbiter in Pärnu. In the Estonian Chess Championships, he has won gold (1967), 2 silver (1954, 1965) and bronze (1963) medals. In 1967 Baltic Chess Championship Helmuth Luik became a Soviet Master. In 1967 he participated in Soviet Chess Championships in Kharkiv. In 1969, he won «Kalev» Chess Championship. Five times Helmuth Luik played for Estonia in Soviet Team Chess Championships (1958, 1960-1967) and two times played for Estonian team «Kalev» in Soviet Team Chess Cup (1966, 1968).

Helmuth Luik has held senior administrator positions in the Estonian chess - Estonian Chess Club president (1967-1975), deputy director and director of the Paul Keres House of Chess (1975-1992), member of the Estonian Chess Federation Presidium.
