= Maaja Ranniku =

Estonian chess player

Personal information
- Born: 1941-03-01 Abja-Paluoja, Estonia
- Died: 2004-10-24 Tallinn, Estonia

Chess career
- Country: Soviet Union (until 1991), Estonia (after 1991)
- Title: Woman International Master (WIM)

Maaja Ranniku (1 March 1941 – 24 October 2004) was an Estonian chess player (represented the Soviet Union until 1991).

She was twice the winner of the Women's Soviet Championship: in 1963 (after beating at tiebreak Tatiana Zatulovskaya 4-2) and 1967.

She was awarded the title of Woman International Master in 1964.

Maaja Ranniku participated in many Estonian Championships, winning the women's title 10 times (1961, 1963, 1967, 1973, 1981, 1982, 1984, 1987, 1988, and 1991).

At the 1964 women's Candidates Tournament, played in Sukhumi, she placed 6th in a field of 18 players.

In 1992, she played with the Estonian team at the 30th Chess Olympiad in Manila, scoring 6½ points out of 11 games played.

She had many good results in international tournaments:

- 1969: first place at Budapest
- 1971: first place at Braşov
- 1973: second place at Vrnjačka Banja
- 1978: third place at the women's zonal tournament in Frunze

A photograph of her is published here.
