= Valter Heuer =

Estonian writer and chess player

Personal information
- Born: July 14, 1928 Elva, Estonia
- Died: March 2, 2006 (aged 77) Jämejala, Estonia

Chess career
- Country: Estonia; Soviet Union; Estonia

Valter Heuer (14 July 1928 – 2 March 2006) was an Estonian writer and chess player, who won the Estonian Chess Championship. He was awarded the Soviet Master title in 1960.

== Chess career ==
In 1960 Valter Heuer became a Soviet Master after won classification match against German Fridshtein — 7½ : 1½ (+6 −0 =3). He won the Estonian Chess Championship in 1976, finished second in 1962 and finished third in 1961. In 1981 Heuer won the Estonian Rapid Chess Championship. Heuer has played for Estonia five times in the Soviet Team Chess Championships (1953, 1955, 1962, 1963, 1975), and once played for the Estonian team "Kalev" in the Soviet Team Chess Cup (1966).

== Writer ==
Valter Heuer graduated from University of Tartu with a degree in Estonian philology. Many years he worked as sports journalist in various magazines. He was a co-author of the Estonian book about 1964 Summer Olympics - "Tokyo 1964". In 1977 Heuer published his biographical book about the legendary Estonian chess master Paul Keres - "Meie Keres" ("Our Keres"). This monograph has several editions and translations but Heuer received the prestigious Estonian Writers' Union Juhan Smuul prize (1977). In 2001 Valter Heuer was awarded by the 4th Class Order of the Estonian Red Cross.
