= Mark Lapidus =

Estonian chess player

Personal information
- Born: 27 December 1995 (age 30) Tallinn, Estonia

Chess career
- Country: Estonia
- FIDE rating: 2254 (September 2019)
- Peak rating: 2272 (April 2019)

Mark Lapidus (born 27 December 1995) is an Estonian chess player who won the Estonian Chess Championship in 2012.

== Chess career ==
Mark Lapidus won the Estonian Junior Chess Championships (U16) in 2009 and 2011. From 2004 he participated in the European Junior Chess Championships and the World Junior Chess Championships in different age groups. He won an IM norm at the World Junior Championship (2012).

In the Estonian Chess Championship Mark Lapidus has won gold medal (2012).

Mark Lapidus played for Estonia in Chess Olympiads:

- In 2012, at second board in the 40th Chess Olympiad in Istanbul (+2, =2, -4).
