= Valeriya Gansvind =

Estonian chess player (born 1965)

Personal information
- Born: Valeriya I. Gansvind; 22 November 1965 (age 60) Moscow Oblast, Russia

Chess career
- Country: Soviet Union; Estonia
- Title: Woman FIDE Master (2001)
- FIDE rating: 2086 (February 2020)
- Peak rating: 2314 (October 2002)

Valeriya I. Gansvind (also spelled Valeria, born 22 November 1965 in Moscow Oblast) is an Estonian chess player who holds the title of Woman FIDE Master (WFM).

== Biography ==
Gansvind learned to play chess at age eleven. In 1983, she graduated from Moscow boarding sports school. In chess competitions she played for Estonia because her mother is from Tartu. In the Estonian Women's Chess Championship, Gansvind has won 2 gold (2006, 2009) and 2 silver medals (2005, 2008).

She played for Estonia in Chess Olympiads:

- In 2006, at third board in the 37th Chess Olympiad in Turin (+3 −3 =5);
- In 2008, at second board in the 38th Chess Olympiad in Dresden (+6 −1 =4);
- In 2010, at second board in the 39th Chess Olympiad in Khanty-Mansiysk (+3 −4 =4).

Gansvind worked as a chess coach. She lives in Moscow and Canada, taking part in there a chess tournaments. Her ex-husband is chess grandmaster Sergey Kalinitschew. Valeriya's son Andrey Kalinichev is FIDE Master (FM) and has won Estonian Chess Championship silver medal in 2005.
