= Kalle Kiik =

Estonian chess player

Personal information
- Born: 10 February 1963 (age 63) Paide, then part of Estonian SSR, Soviet Union

Chess career
- Country: Soviet Union; Estonia
- Title: International Master (1993)
- Peak rating: 2475 (April 2009)

Kalle Kiik (born 10 February 1963) is an Estonian chess player, who won the Estonian Chess Championship. He was awarded the International Master title in 1993.

== Biography ==
Kiik was born in Paide, the son of Estonian chess coach Jakob Kiik (12.05.1924—15.01.2014). In 1981 Kalle Kiik graduated from secondary school in Rakvere and in 1986 he graduated from University of Tartu with a chess coach degree. In 1981 Kiik won the Estonian Junior Chess Championship. He won the Estonian Chess Championship in 1988, finished second in 1987 and three times finished third (1986, 1993, 1997). Kalle Kiik played for Estonia three times in the Soviet Team Chess Championships (1983-1986). Kalle Kiik played for Estonia in Chess Olympiads:

- In 1992, at reserve board in the 30th Chess Olympiad in Manila (+2 −0 =2);
- In 2000, at reserve board in the 34th Chess Olympiad in Istanbul (+2 −2 =1).

Kalle Kiik played for Estonia in European Team Chess Championship:

- In 1992, at third board in Debrecen (+2 −3 =4).

In 1994 Kiik won the chess tournament in Netherlands town Sas van Gent. He worked as a chess coach in Estonia and Finland. In 2005 Kiik was the head coach of Estonian national women's and youth teams but in 2008 he was the head coach of Finland national junior team.
