= Pavel Vorobjov =

Estonian chess player

Personal information
- Born: 1981 (age 44–45)

Chess career
- Country: Estonia
- Peak rating: 2305 (February 2019)

Pavel Vorobjov (born 1981) is an Estonian chess player, Estonian Chess Championship winner (2011).

== Chess career ==
In the 2010s, Pavel Vorobjov was one of the strongest young chess players in Estonia. In 2011 in Tallinn, he won the Estonian Chess Championship.

Pavel Vorobjov played for Estonia in the Chess Olympiad:

- In 2012, at first board in the 40th Chess Olympiad in Istanbul (+4, =3, -2).
