= Kõo =

Village in Estonia

- Village
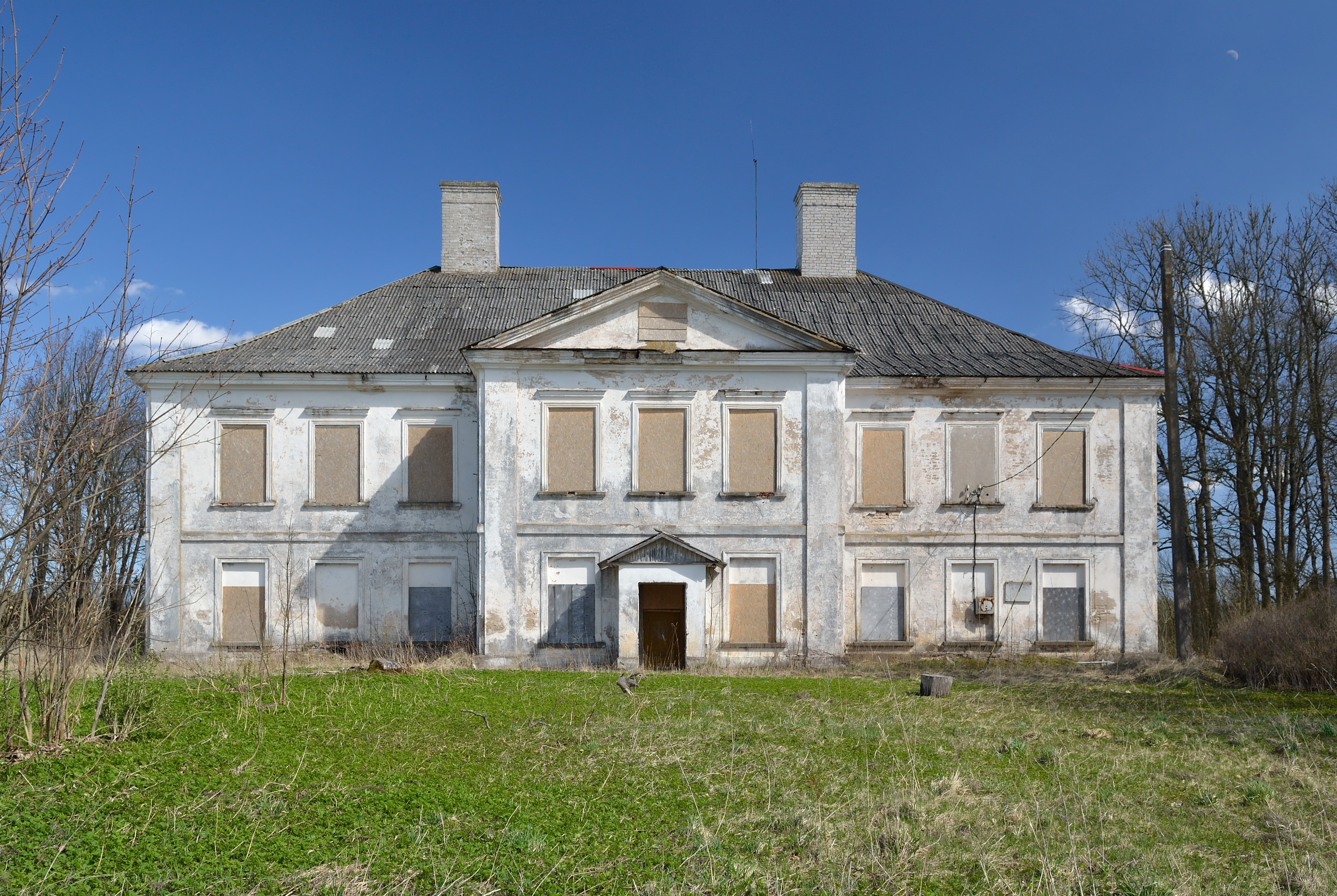
- Kõo manor

- Location in Estonia
- Coordinates: 58°37′55″N 25°43′38″E
- Country: Estonia
- County: Viljandi County
- Municipality: Põhja-Sakala Parish

Population (2000)
  - Total: 326

Kõo (German: Wolmarshof) is a village in Viljandi County, Estonia. It was the administrative centre of Kõo Parish. Kõo has a population of 326 (as of 2000).
