= Margareth Olde =

Estonian chess player (born 2000)

Personal information
- Born: 15 November 2000 (age 25) Tallinn, Estonia

Chess career
- Country: Estonia
- Title: Woman International Master (2021)
- Peak rating: 2258 (October 2021)

Margareth Olde (born 15 November 2000) is an Estonian chess player who holds the title of Woman International Master.

== Biography ==
She is the daughter of Estonian chess players Hendrik Olde and Margit Brokko.

In the Estonian Women's Chess Championship Margareth Olde has won four gold (2015, 2018, 2024, 2025) and three silver (2016, 2017, 2020) medals. Also she won the Estonian Under-18 Girl's Chess Championship in 2015, and Estonian Under-16 and Under-20 Girl's Chess Championships in 2016. In 2016 Margareth Olde won the Estonian Rapid Chess Championship. In 2015, she was a member of Estonian U18 national team that won the 15th European U18 Team Chess Championship (girls) in Karpacz. Margareth Olde was named the best young chess player of Estonia in 2015. In August 2021, Margareth Olde was the best among women in the "Riga Technical University Open" tournament "A".

Margareth Olde played for Estonia in Chess Olympiads:

- In 2016, at third board in the 42nd Chess Olympiad in Baku (+4 −3 =3),
- In 2018, at second board in the 43rd Chess Olympiad (women) in Batumi (+4, =3, -3),
- In 2022, at second board in the 44th Chess Olympiad (women) in Chennai (+4, =4, -2),
- In 2024, at second board in the 45th Chess Olympiad (women) in Budapest (+4, =5, -2).
