= Ilja Sirosh =

Estonian chess player (born 1998)

Personal information
- Born: 19 March 1998 (age 28) Sillamäe, Estonia

Chess career
- Country: Estonia
- Title: International Master (2019)
- Peak rating: 2407 (November 2018)

Ilja Sirosh (born 19 March 1998) is an Estonian chess International Master (2019), Estonian Chess Championship winner (2017).

== Chess career ==
In 2017, in Tallinn Ilja Sirosh won Estonian Chess Championship.

Ilja Sirosh played for Estonia in Chess Olympiad:

- In 2018, at fourth board in the 43rd Chess Olympiad in Batumi (+4, =5, -2).

In 2019, he was awarded the FIDE International Master (IM) title.
