= Tuulikki Laesson =

Estonian chess player (born 1969)

Personal information
- Born: 19 March 1969 (age 57) Tallinn, then part of Estonian SSR, Soviet Union

Chess career
- Country: Soviet Union; Estonia
- Title: Woman International Master (1993)
- FIDE rating: 2210 (July 2007)
- Peak rating: 2290 (July 1996)

Tuulikki Laesson (born 19 March 1969 in Tallinn) is an Estonian chess player who twice won the Estonian Chess Championship for women.

== Chess career ==
Tuulikki Laesson started to play chess at the age of 6. In 1987, she won bronze medal in Soviet Junior Championship in Chelyabinsk. She won Estonian Chess Championship for women in 1993 and 1996, and Open Latvian Chess Championship for women in 1992. Also, Tuulikki Laesson won 2 silver medals (1986, 1998) and 2 bronze medals (1992, 1997) in Estonian Chess Championship for women. Tuulikki Laesson played in Soviet Women's Team chess championship in 1986. Tuulikki Laesson played for Estonia in Chess Olympiads:

- In 1992, at first reserve board in the 30th Chess Olympiad in Manila (+3, =0, -3);
- In 1994, at first reserve board in the 31st Chess Olympiad in Moscow (+5, =3, -1);
- In 1996, at first board in the 32nd Chess Olympiad in Yerevan (+5, =3, -5);
- In 1998, at third board in the 33rd Chess Olympiad in Elista (+5, =2, -3);
- In 2004, at third board in the 36th Chess Olympiad in Calvia (+5, =1, -2).

== Personal life ==
By profession, Tuulikki Laesson is a lawyer. She worked in Estonian Ministry of Economic Affairs and Communications and in company "Laesson & Partnerid OÜ".
