= Estonian Canadians =

Ethnic group in Canada

Kanada eestlased (Estonian) Canadiens estoniens (French)

Total population
- 23,455 (by ancestry, 2021 Census)

Regions with significant populations
- Toronto · Montreal · Vancouver

Languages
- Canadian English, Canadian French, Estonian

Religion
- Protestant (Lutheran)

Related ethnic groups
- Estonians, Estonian Americans, Finnish Canadians, Latvian Canadians, Lithuanian Canadians

Estonian Canadians (Estonian: Kanada eestlased) are Canadian citizens or residents of Estonian descent or Estonian-born people who reside in Canada. Currently 24,530 people of Estonian descent live in Canada.(according to some sources up to 50,000 people).

In the late 1940s and early 1950s, about 17,000 arrived in Canada. The city with the largest population of Estonians outside Estonia is Toronto. The first Estonian World Festival was held in Toronto in 1972.

Some notable Estonian Canadians and Canadians with Estonian ethnicity include Kalle Lasn, Alison Pill, Uno Prii, Elmar Tampõld, Endel Tulving, and Andreas Vaikla.

== See also ==
- Canada–Estonia relations
- European Canadians
- Estonian Americans
