= Aaron Feinstein =

Estonian chess player

Aaron Feinstein (fl. 1903–1910) was an Estonian chess master.

Feinstein lived in Reval (now Tallinn, Estonia) before World War I and played in several tournaments there. He took 3rd in 1903 (Sohn won), tied for 7-8th in 1904 (Bernhard Gregory won), shared 1st with Sohn in 1905, tied for 2nd-3rd, behind Khmelevsky, in 1909, and won in 1910 (unofficial Estonian chess championship).
