= Iivo Nei =

Estonian chess player (1931–2026)

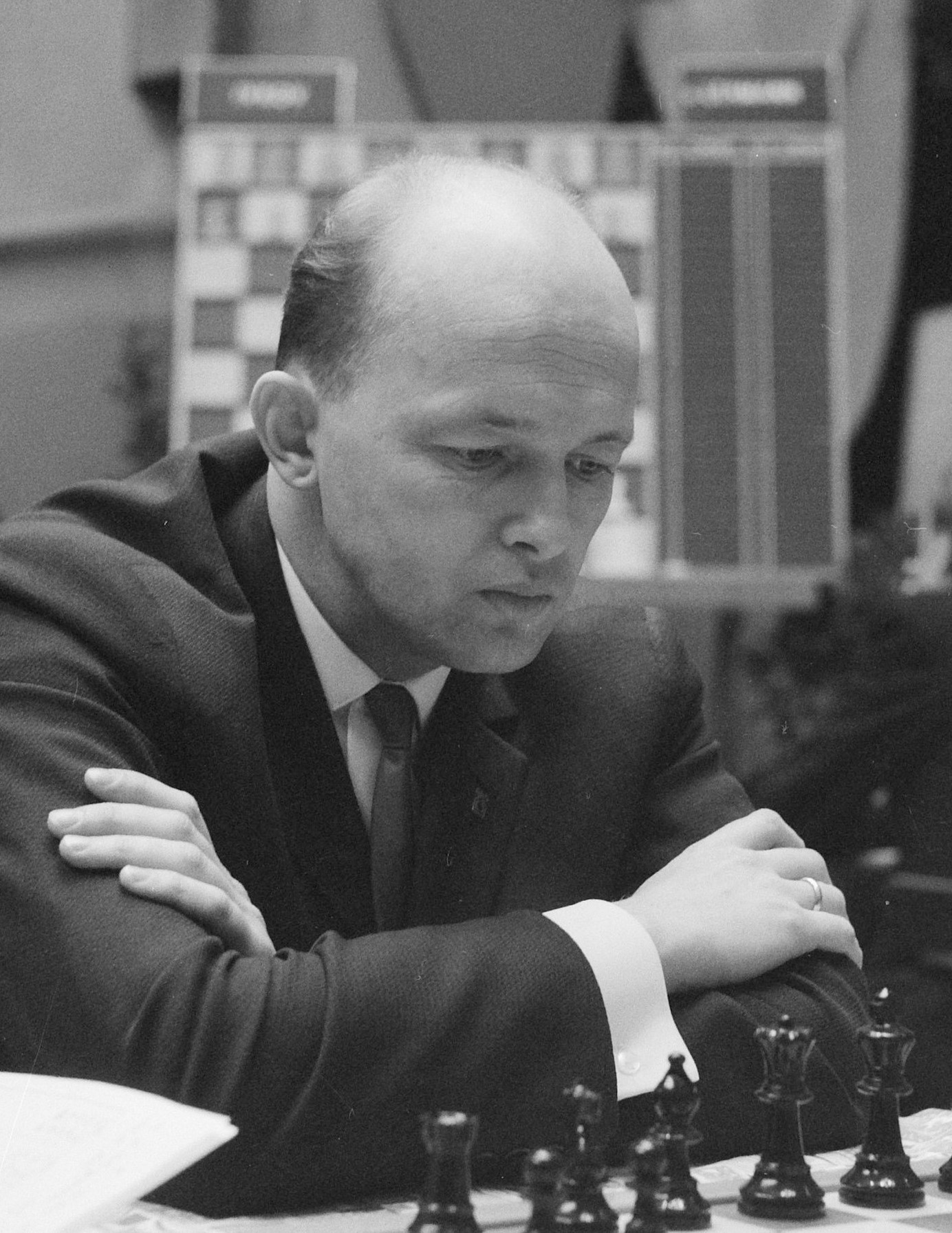
- Nei in 1966

Personal information
- Born: 31 October 1931 Tartu, Estonia
- Died: 6 July 2026 (aged 94)
- Occupation: Chess grandmaster

Chess career
- Country: Soviet Union; Estonia
- Title: International Master (1964); Grandmaster (2024)
- Peak rating: 2510 (January 1976)
- Peak ranking: No. 82 (July 1972)

Iivo Nei (31 October 1931 – 6 July 2026) was an Estonian chess grandmaster.

== Tournament career ==
In 1947, at the beginning of his career, Nei took 3rd in Leningrad (Saint Petersburg) at the sixth USSR junior championships, which were won by Viktor Korchnoi. In 1948, he tied for first with Korchnoi in Tallinn (seventh USSR juniors championships). Nei won the Estonian Championship eight times (1951, 1952, 1956, 1960–1962, 1971, and 1974). In 1955, he tied for third through sixth place in Pärnu (Baltic Republics championships), an event won by Paul Keres. In 1960, he tied for 14–15th at the 27th USSR championships in Leningrad, won by Korchnoi. Nei won the Baltic Republics championships in 1961 in Palanga, in 1962 in Tartu, in 1963 in Estonia, and in 1964 in Pärnu. In 1964, he also tied for first with Keres in the Beverwijk (Corus chess tournament). In 1965, he took second, behind Vladas Mikėnas, in Palanga (Baltic championships).

== Recognitions ==
Nei was awarded the International Master (IM) title in 1964. He was one of Boris Spassky's seconds (along with Efim Geller and Nikolai Krogius) for the 1972 Fischer–Spassky World Championship match. He also served as Nona Gaprindashvili's second for the Gaprindashvili-Kushnir World Championship. He went on to become a trainer, teaching grandmaster Lembit Oll. In February 2024, he was awarded by FIDE the title of Honorary Grandmaster. After the death of Andreas Dückstein on 28 August 2024, Nei became the oldest living grandmaster.

== Personal life and death ==
His youngest brother Mati Nei (born 1942) is also a chess player and won the Estonian Chess Championship in 1990.

Iivo Nei died on 6 July 2026, at the age of 94.
