= Urve Manuel =

Canadian glass artist

Urve Manuel is a Canadian glass artist, based in Newfoundland and Labrador. During the 2022 Russian invasion of Ukraine, she created around 1,000 sun catchers to raise funds for Ukrainians; she ultimately collected about $46,000.

== Early life and education ==
Manuel has Estonian heritage through her grandfather. She attended university in Toronto before moving to Newfoundland and Labrador in around 2003. She was a firefighter and a sea kayak guide, and became a glass artist after becoming self-taught in around 2004 after attending glass work classes in the evening. She attended the United States for graduate classes in art.

== Career ==
Her glass work was exhibited in Toronto's One of a Kind Christmas show in 2013. She moved to Rocky Harbour, Newfoundland and Labrador, in 2015, where she founded a glass shop. As of 2022, she continues to work there.

One of her pieces is a recreation of an ice-fishing shack, which is made out of several panels of stained glass. The piece—which depicts the northern lights and the animals of Canada, including polar bears and fish—was inspired by her childhood; she, her siblings, and her grandfather would often go ice-fishing together. It took several months to create, and was first displayed in 2022. In response to the 2022 Russian invasion of Ukraine, which led to a large number of refugees fleeing Ukraine, she began creating sun catchers to fund-raise for charities in Ukraine. She said her family's personal history of fleeing Estonia during Soviet occupation was similar to Ukrainians fleeing their own country. She initially planned to create 25 sun catchers a day, but a rise in demand led her to create more. In May 2022, after about two months of working on the fund-raising project, she sold about 1,000, and raised about $46,000 for various nonprofits.
