= Johannes Türn =

Estonian chess player (1899–1993)

- Born: May 27, 1899; Tartu, Governorate of Livonia, Russian Empire (now Tartu, Estonia)
- Died: March 8, 1993 (aged 93); Tallinn, Estonia
- Occupations: Chess player; draughts player; sports organiser
- Known for: Estonian chess champion (1925, 1941, 1944); Estonian draughts champion (1950); played for Estonia in Chess Olympiads

Johannes Türn (27 May 1899, in Tartu – 8 March 1993, in Tallinn) was an Estonian chess player.

== Biography ==
Türn played in numerous Estonian championships. In 1923, he took 2nd, behind Paul Rinne, in Tallinn (1st EST-ch). In 1925, he won in Tallinn (2nd EST-ch). In 1930, he took 2nd, behind Vladas Mikėnas (3rd EST-ch). In 1932, he tied for 3rd-4th with Gunnar Friedemann, behind Leho Laurine, and Rinne (4th EST-ch). In 1937, he took 3rd, behind Paul Felix Schmidt, and Ilmar Raud (9th EST-ch).

In August/September 1936, he played on fourth board in the unofficial Chess Olympiad in Munich (+8 –4 =7). In July/August 1937, he played on fourth board at the 7th Chess Olympiad in Stockholm (+1 –6 =4). In August/September 1939, he played as first reserve at the 8th Chess Olympiad in Buenos Aires (+3 –3 =4), as the Estonian team won the bronze medal.

During World War II, Türn played in the Estonian championships, although the country was occupied by either the Soviet Union or Germany. In 1941, he tied for 1st with Feliks Kibbermann in Tallinn (11th EST-ch), but took the title after a play-off match (+3 –0 =1). In 1942, he took 2nd, behind Paul Keres, in Tallinn (12th EST-ch). In 1944, he tied for 1st-2nd with August Eller in Viljandi (14th EST-ch).

He also played draughts. In 1950 he co-won Estonian championship with Ülo Kesker. He was also co-author of the first Estonian book of draughts (Kabemängu õpik, 1951).

== Notable chess games ==
- Johannes Türn vs Paul Keres, Tallinn 1935, 7th EST-ch, French, MacCutcheon, Lasker Variation, C12, 1-0
- Johannes Türn vs Kazimierz Makarczyk, Munich 1936 (ol), Semi-Slav Defense, Marshall Gambit, D31, 1-0
- Johannes Türn vs Teodor Regedziński, Buenos Aires 1939, 8th Olympiad, Queen’s Gambit Declined, Semi-Tarrasch, D41, 1-0
