= Tuulikki (name) =

Tuulikki is a Finnish female given name. The nameday is the 22nd of February. As of May 2015 there were close to 74,300 people with this name in Finland. In Finnish mythology, Tuulikki was the name of a Finnish forest goddess, the daughter of Tapio and Mielikki.

== Notable people ==
- Tuulikki Abraham (born 1969), Namibian politician
- Tuulikki Bartosik (born 1976) is an Estonian accordionist
- Tarja-Tuulikki Tarsala (1937–2007), Finnish film actress
- Tuulikki Hämäläinen (1940–2023), Finnish economist and politician
- Tuulikki Jahre (born 1951), Swedish cyclist
- Tuulikki Koivunen Bylund (born 1947), Finnish-Swedish theologian
- Tuulikki Laesson (born 1969), Estonian chess player
- Tuulikki Pietilä (1917–2009), Finnish artist
- Tuulikki Pyykkönen (born 1963), Finnish cross-country skier
- Tuulikki Ukkola (1943–2019), Finnish politician and journalist

== See also ==
- Anneli Tuulikki Jäätteenmäki, Finnish politician and Prime Minister
- Hanna Tuulikki, Finnish-English vocalist, musician and artist
