= Tuuli Tasa =

Estonian footballer

Personal information
- Date of birth: 12 November 2002 (age 23)
- Place of birth: Tartu, Estonia
- Position: Defender

Team information
- Current team: Tammeka
- Number: 13

International career^{‡}
Years	Team	Apps	(Gls)
2018	Estonia U-17	9	(0)
2019	Estonia U-19	5	(0)
2019–	Estonia	4	(0)
- ‡ National team caps and goals as of 20:03, 15 February 2021 (UTC)

Tuuli Tasa (born 12 November 2002) is an Estonian footballer who plays as a defender for Tammeka and the Estonia women's national team.

== Career ==
She made her debut for the Estonia national team on 18 June 2019 against Belarus, coming on as a substitute for Katrin Loo.
