= Tuuli Mattelmäki =

Finnish designer (born 1965)

Tuuli Mattelmäki (born 1965) is a Finnish industrial designer, researcher and lecturer, working and publishing in service design and human centred design.

Tuuli Mattelmäki works as a researcher and project manager at the Aalto University School of Arts, Design and Architecture where she is an associate professor at the Department of Design. She is also a team leader at Encore: Aalto University collaborative design research project.

As an industrial designer she has applied her design thinking skills in enhancing innovative approaches that are inspired by the richness of human experiences and everyday practices.

During her research she has worked on several projects for developing tools and processes for user-centred product concept design. Starting point for her research is an empathic design and explorative methods in user-centred design, design probes in particular. She has been actively involved in several user focus case studies and collaborations with the partner companies.

Her current research concerns creative co-design methods in design for services, as well as the new application contexts of design approaches. Her research with design probes has inspired students and organisations to apply the approach in various projects.

Her publications include articles about probes, empathic design and design for user experience.

“Design Probes", her dissertation from University of Art and Design in Helsinki from 2006, presents a step-by-step overview of the cultural probes method and its history and offers nearly 200 pages of richly illustrated examples, history and theory.

== Sources ==
- https://people.aalto.fi/index.html?profilepage=isfor#!tuuli_mattelmaki
- http://www.servicedesignbooks.org/isbn/9515582113/design-probes/
- http://designresearch.aalto.fi/groups/encore/people/active-members/tuuli-mattelmaki/
- https://shop.aalto.fi/media/attachments/55d58/mattelmaki.pdf
