= Tatjana Fomina =

Estonian chess player

Personal information
- Born: April 26, 1954 (age 72) Tallinn, then part of Estonian SSR, Soviet Union

Chess career
- Country: Soviet Union; Estonia
- Title: Woman Grandmaster (2014)
- Peak rating: 2305 (January 1996)

Tatjana Fomina (born April 26, 1954 in Tallinn) is an Estonian chess player holding the title of Woman Grandmaster and twice European senior women's champion.

== Chess career ==
Fomina started play chess in Tallinn's Pioneers Palace. In 1969 and 1970 she twice won Estonian juniors chess championship. In 1971, she won USSR junior's Championship in Riga.

During the period from 1971 to 1983 Fomina nine times participated in USSR Women's Chess Championships. The best result - silver medal in 1975. In 1976, she shared 8th – 9th place with Milunka Lazarević in Women's Interzonal (Roosendaal). In 1985, 1988 and 1990 she won Baltic Women's Chess Championships.

Tatjana Fomina is ten times Estonian Women's Chess Championship winner (1977–1978, 1983, 1989, 1992, 1998, 2002–2003, 2012–2013). Also she had five silver (1973–1974, 1988, 1997, 2007) and eight bronze (1975, 1982, 1984, 1990–1991, 1993–1995) Estonian Women's Chess Championship medals. Fomina had 12 titles of Estonian rapid chess champion (1990, 1998–2000, 2003–2005, 2007–2009, 2011–2012) and 8 titles of Estonian blitz chess champion (2004–2009, 2011–2012). Curiously, while at her peak, despite having GM standard results – Fomina could not secure a Women's Grandmaster Title. She obtained the title years later for winning World Senior Women's Championship.

Tatjana Fomina won the bronze medal at the Women's World Senior Chess Championship five times (2005, 2006, 2008, 2009, 2010). In 2012, she won the Women's European Senior Chess Championship in Kaunas and also took silver (2007) and bronze (2006) medals in this competitions. She won the age category 50+ of the same event in 2014, when for the first time the senior championships were split in two divisions (50+ and 65+).

== Team chess results ==
Fomina played for Estonia in Chess Olympiads:

- In 1992, at first board in the 30th Chess Olympiad in Manila (+5 −3 =5);
- In 1994, at second board in the 31st Chess Olympiad in Moscow (+5 −4 =3);
- In 1996, at second board in the 32nd Chess Olympiad in Yerevan (+7 −3 =3);
- In 1998, at second board in the 33rd Chess Olympiad in Elista (+6 −3 =2);
- In 2000, at second board in the 34th Chess Olympiad in Istanbul (+8 −3 =2);
- In 2002, at first board in the 35th Chess Olympiad in Bled (+5 −7 =1);
- In 2010, at first board in the 39th Chess Olympiad in Khanty-Mansiysk (+1 −7 =0);
- In 2012, at second board in the 40th Chess Olympiad in Istanbul (+4 −3 =2);
- In 2014, at fourth board in the 41st Chess Olympiad in Tromsø (+5 −3 =0).

Fomina played for Estonia in European Team Chess Championship:

- In 1992, at first board in Debrecen (+3 −5 =1);
- In 2007, at second board in Heraklion (+2 −3 =3).

== Personal life ==
Tatjana Fomina graduated from secondary school in Tallinn (1971), faculty of law in University of Tartu (1980) and faculty of foreign languages in Tallinn University (2002). She worked as chess trainer and as legal professional.
