= Ottomar Ladva =

Estonian chess grandmaster (born 1997)

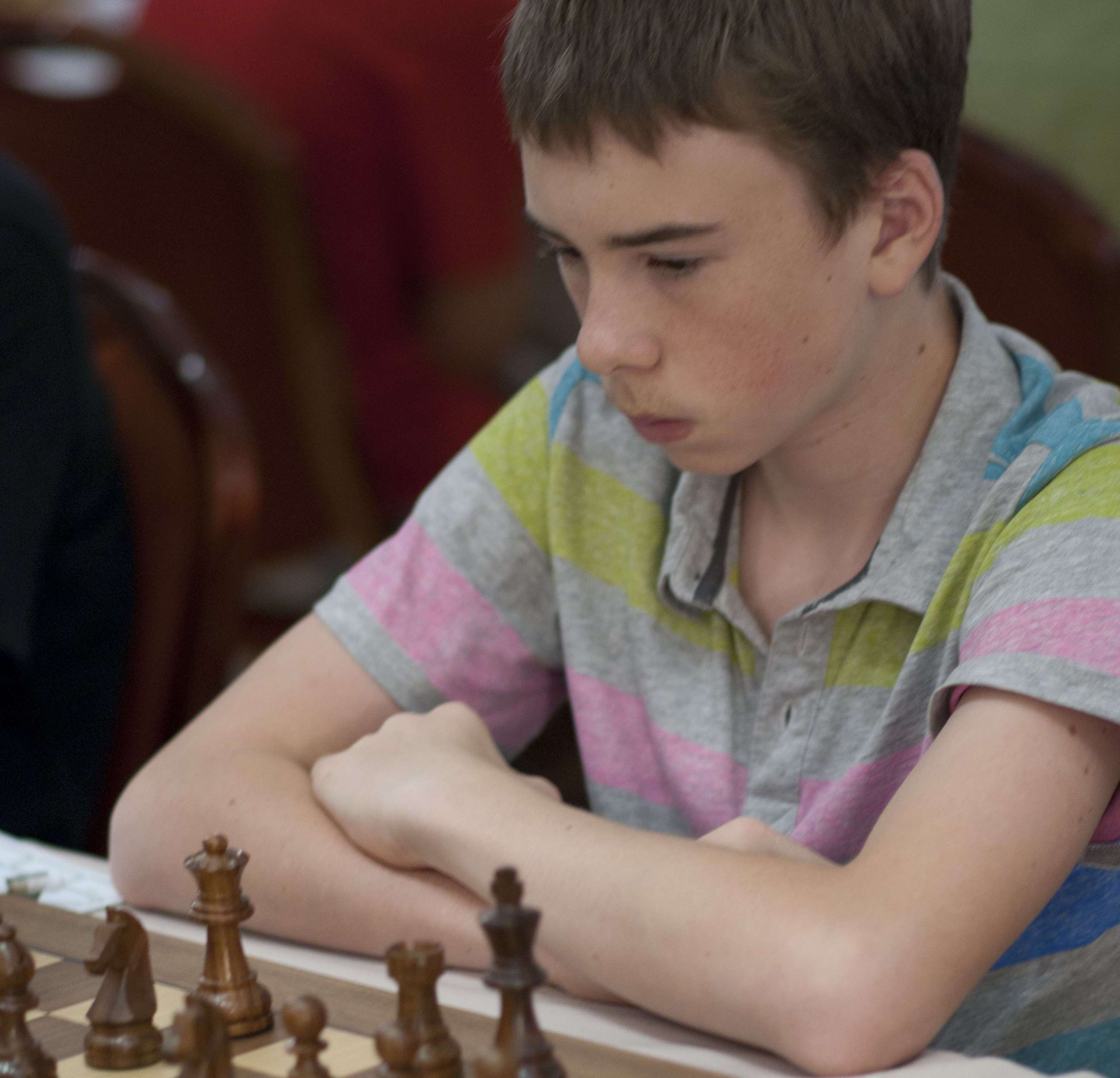
- Ladva in 2012

Personal information
- Born: 17 June 1997 (age 29) Haapsalu, Estonia

Chess career
- Country: Estonia
- Title: Grandmaster (2016)
- FIDE rating: 2513 (July 2026)
- Peak rating: 2543 (September 2017)

Ottomar Ladva (born 17 June 1997) is an Estonian chess player and grandmaster. He is a four-time Estonian Chess Champion (2013, 2015, 2016 and 2018). He has also achieved success in high-stakes poker tournaments, such as his €439,400 win in the 2024 PokerStars European Poker Tour Barcelona.

== Chess career ==
Ladva won the Estonian Junior Chess Championships (U18) in 2010, 2012, 2013 and 2014. Since 2006 he has participated in the European Junior Chess Championships and in European Union's Junior Chess Championships in different age groups.

In the Estonian Chess Championship, he has won four gold (2013, 2015, 2016, 2018) and one silver (2014) medals. He became the youngest Estonian champion at age 15, when he beat Lembit Oll's (1982) record.

In June 2015, he won a round-robin tournament in Riga finalised to get a Grandmaster norm.

Ladva represented Estonia in Chess Olympiads:

- In 2012, at reserve board in the 40th Chess Olympiad in Istanbul (+5, =1, -3)
- In 2014, at first board in the 41st Chess Olympiad in Tromsø (+5, =3, -3)
- In 2016, at second board in the 42nd Chess Olympiad in Baku (+4, =5, -2)
