= Tuuli Vahtra =

Estonian chess player (born 1989)

Personal information
- Born: March 4, 1989 (age 37) Kõo Parish, Estonia

Chess career
- Country: Estonia
- Title: Woman FIDE Master (2009)
- Peak rating: 2056 (February 2014)

Tuuli Vahtra (born March 4, 1989, in Kõo Parish) is an Estonian chess player. She received the FIDE title of Woman FIDE Master (WFM) in 2009.

== Biography ==
In 2007 Tuuli Vahtra graduated from gymnasium in Viljandi and in 2010 graduated from Tallinn University of Technology Faculty of Economics with bachelor's degree. From 1999 to 2007 she participated in the European Junior Chess Championships and the World Junior Chess Championships in different age groups. In 2007 Tuuli Vahtra won the Estonian Junior Chess Championships. In Estonian Women's Chess Championship Tuuli Vahtra has won gold (2010) and 2 silver medals (2011, 2012).

Tuuli Vahtra played for Estonia in Chess Olympiads:

- In 2008, at reserve board in the 38th Chess Olympiad in Dresden (+5 −1 =3);
- In 2010, at fourth board in the 39th Chess Olympiad in Khanty-Mansiysk (+4 −3 =3);
- In 2012, at fourth board in the 40th Chess Olympiad in Istanbul (+5 −1 =3).

In 2003, 2005 and 2007 Tuuli Vahtra was named the best young chess player in Estonia. In 2008, she was named the best chess player of Estonia.
