= Urve Kure =

Estonian chess player (1931–2016)

Personal information
- Born: 2 August 1931 Tallinn, Estonia
- Died: 7 June 2016 (aged 84) Tallinn, Estonia

Chess career
- Country: Soviet Union; Estonia

Urve Kure (August 2, 1931 – June 7, 2016) was a former Estonian chess player, who won the Estonian Women's Chess Championship three times, in 1953, 1958, 1965.

== Biography ==
In 1950 graduated from secondary school in Tallinn. Urve Kure was one of the strongest women chess players in Estonia in the 1950s and 1960s. In Estonian Chess Championships for women she has won 3 gold (1953, 1958, 1965), 3 silver (1957, 1959, 1964) and 3 bronze (1954, 1961, 1966) medals. Urve Kure three times played for Estonia in Soviet Team Chess Championships (1958, 1960, 1962) and two times played for Estonian team Kalev in Soviet Team Chess Cup (1966, 1968). All her life worked in the rubber production factory Tegur and other factory Teras.
