= Aleksandr Volodin (linguist) =

Soviet and Russian linguist

Aleksandr Pavlovich Volodin (Russian: Александр Павлович Володин, 14 November 1935 – 6 July 2017) was a Soviet and Russian linguist, specializing in Paleo-Asiatic and Finno-Ugric languages.

Volodin studied Finno-Ugric languages on the College of Philology of the A. A. Zhdanov Leningrad State University between 1953 and 1958. From 1961, he worked at the Language Institute of the Academy of Sciences of the USSR, specializing in endangered Itelmen language of Kamchatka. He received his Ph.D. in 1980, and from 2005 to 2017 he worked as a professor at the Herzen University of Saint Petersburg, as well as with the Institute of Language Research (ILI) of the Languages of the Russian Academy of Sciences (RAN).

Volodin published around 190 scientific and pedagogic papers and textbooks, and 12 scientific monographs. He participated in 10 expeditions to Kamchatka, where he studied the language and culture of Kereks and Itelmen; and on the Naryan-Mar region of Russian Arctic, studying Nenets people and languages.

He lived in Saint Petersburg.
