= Aleksandr Volodin (chess player) =

Estonian chess grandmaster (born 1990)

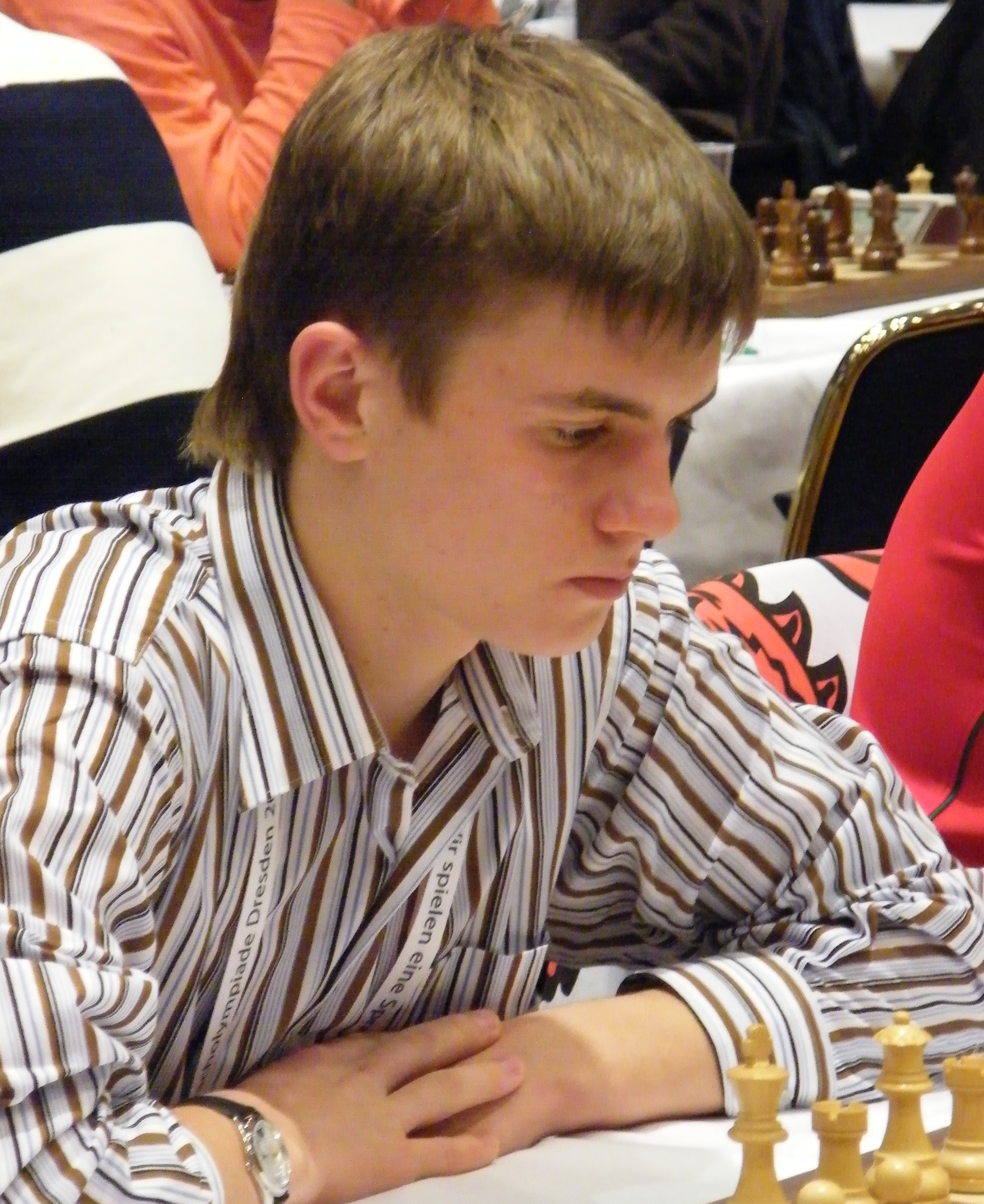
- Aleksandr Volodin in 2008

Personal information
- Born: 10 December 1990 (age 35) Kohtla-Järve, Estonia

Chess career
- Country: Estonia
- Title: Grandmaster (2011)
- FIDE rating: 2485 (July 2026)
- Peak rating: 2523 (July 2011)

Aleksandr Volodin (born 10 December 1990) is an Estonian chess grandmaster (2011), and four-times Estonian Chess Championships winner (2019, 2021, 2022, 2024).

== Chess career ==
From 2000 to 2010 Aleksandr Volodin repeatedly represented Estonia at the European Youth Chess Championship and World Youth Chess Championship in various age categories. His best result - 7th place in European Junior Championships U16 in 2006. In 2008 and 2010 he won the Estonian Youth Chess Championship. Aleksandr Volodin has competed many times in the individual Estonian Chess Championship finals, winning 4 golds (2019, 2021, 2022, 2024), silver (2009) and bronze (2006) medals.

In 2006, Aleksandr Volodin shared 1st place in an International Chess Tournament in Saint Petersburg. In 2009 he finished 2nd in the Salongernas IM International Chess Tournament in Stockholm.

Aleksandr Volodin played for Estonia in Chess Olympiads:

- In 2006, at second reserve board in the 37th Chess Olympiad in Turin (+0, =1, -3),
- In 2008, at reserve board in the 38th Chess Olympiad in Dresden (+4, =1, -2),
- In 2010, at fourth board in the 39th Chess Olympiad in Khanty-Mansiysk (+6, =3, -1),
- In 2016, at first board in the 42nd Chess Olympiad in Baku (+0, =4, -5),
- In 2018, at third board in the 43rd Chess Olympiad in Batumi (+3, =5, -3).

Aleksandr Volodin played for Estonia in the European Team Chess Championship:

- In 2019, at second board in the 22nd European Team Chess Championship in Batumi (+3, =2, -3).

In 2008, he was awarded the FIDE International Master (IM) title and received the FIDE Grandmaster (GM) title three years later.
