= Kõo Parish =

Former municipality of Estonia

Coordinates: 58°37′55″N 25°43′42″E

Kõo Parish Kõo vald
- Former municipality of Estonia
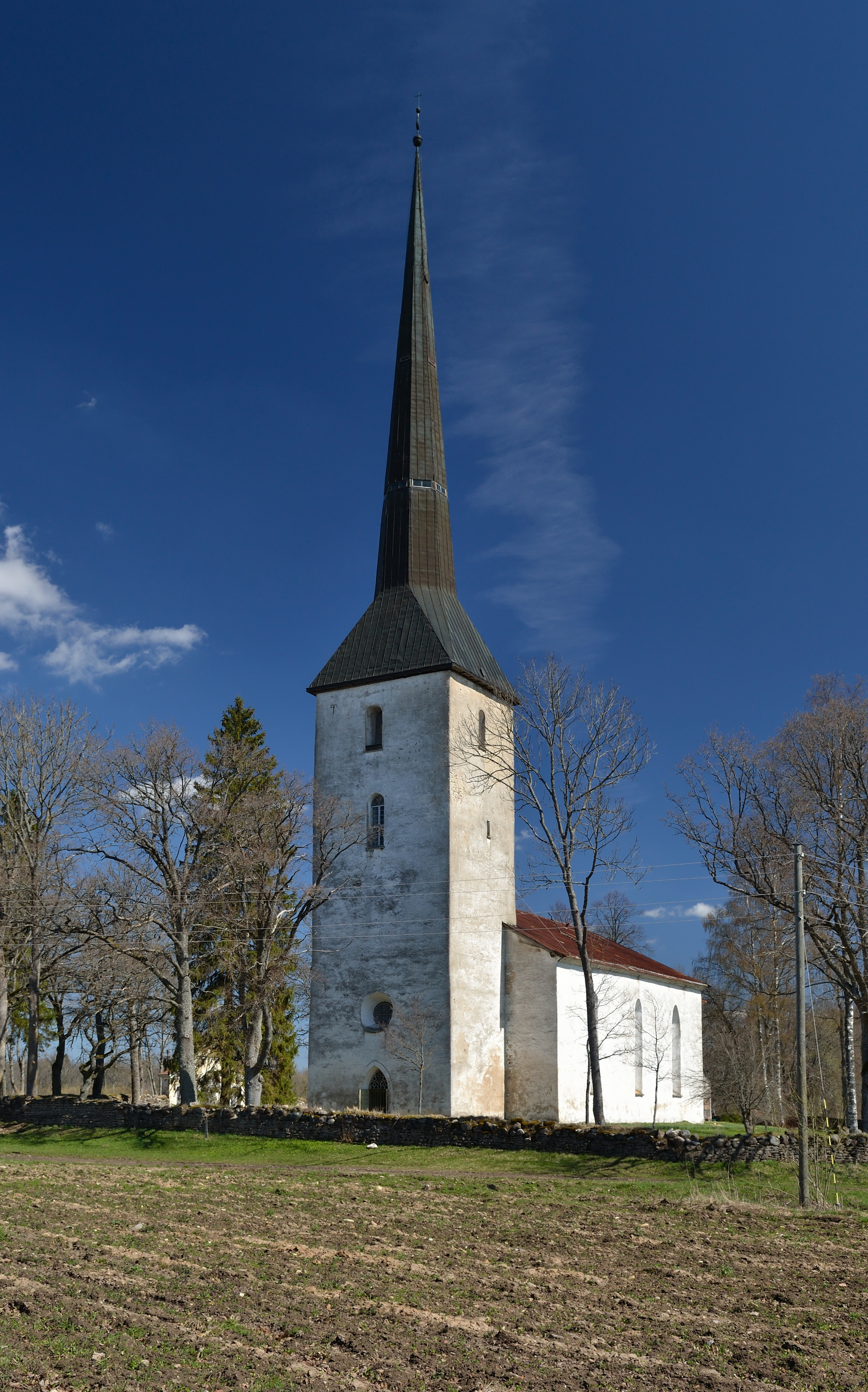
- Pilistvere church

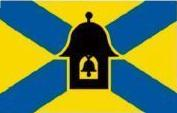
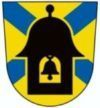
- Flag Coat of arms

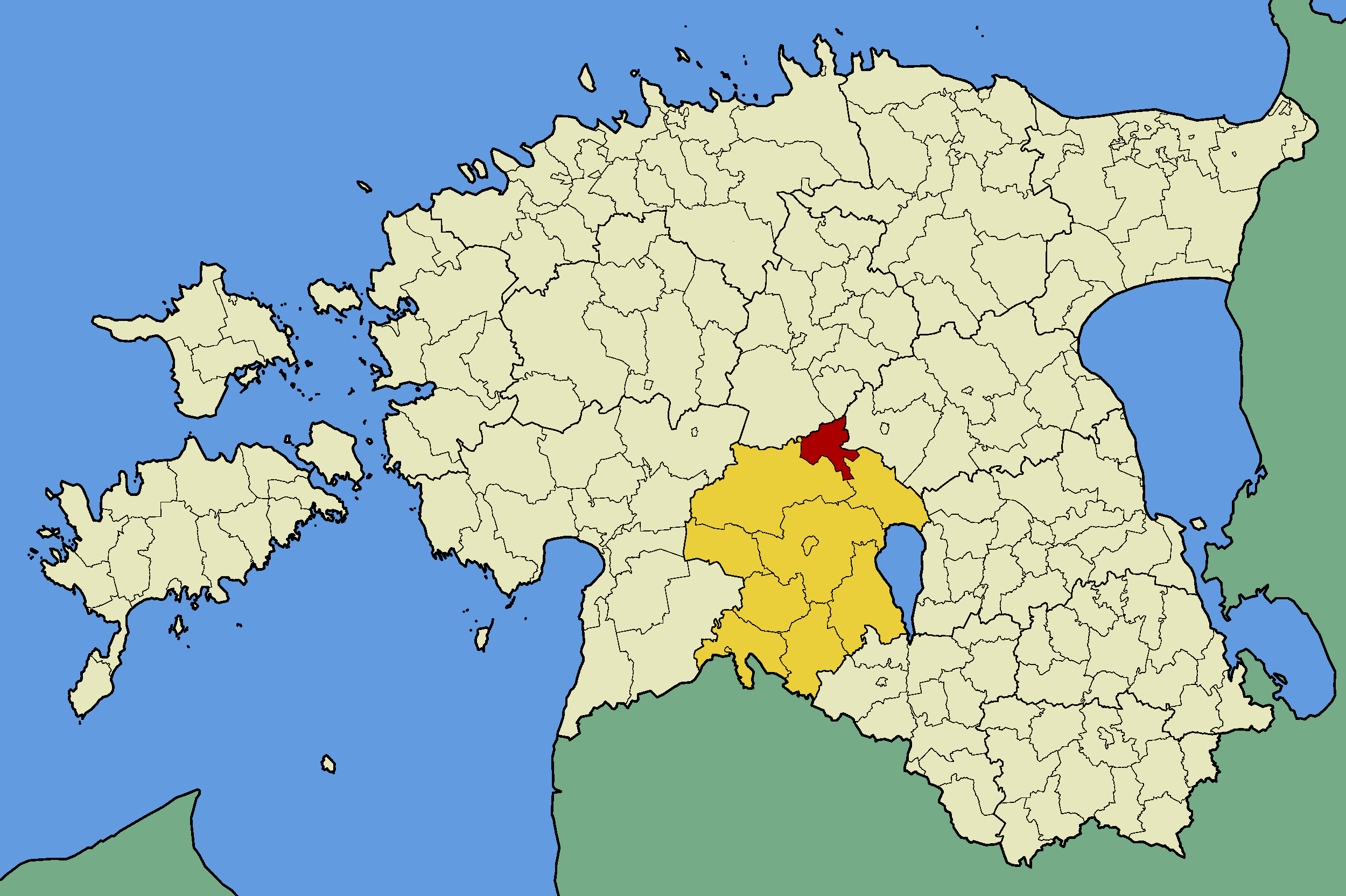
- Kõo Parish within Viljandi County.
- Country: Estonia
- County: Viljandi County
- Administrative centre: Kõo

Area
  - Total: 149.46 km^{2} (57.71 sq mi)

Population (01.01.2011)
  - Total: 1,159
  - Density: 7.755/km^{2} (20.08/sq mi)
- Website: www.vald.koo.ee

Kõo Parish (Estonian: Kõo vald) was a rural municipality of Estonia, in Viljandi County. It had a population of 1,194 (as of 1 January 2009) and an area of 149.46 km^{2}.

== Settlements ==
Villages
Arjassaare
Arussaare
Kangrussaare
Kirivere
Koksvere
Kõo
Loopre
Maalasti
Paaksima
Paenasti
Pilistvere
Saviaugu
Soomevere
Unakvere
Venevere

== Twinnings ==
Kõo Parish has twinned with 3 municipalities:

- Köyliö, Finland (1991)
- Nora, Sweden (1991)
- Fladungen, Germany (1996)
