= Meelis Kanep =

Estonian chess grandmaster (born 1983)

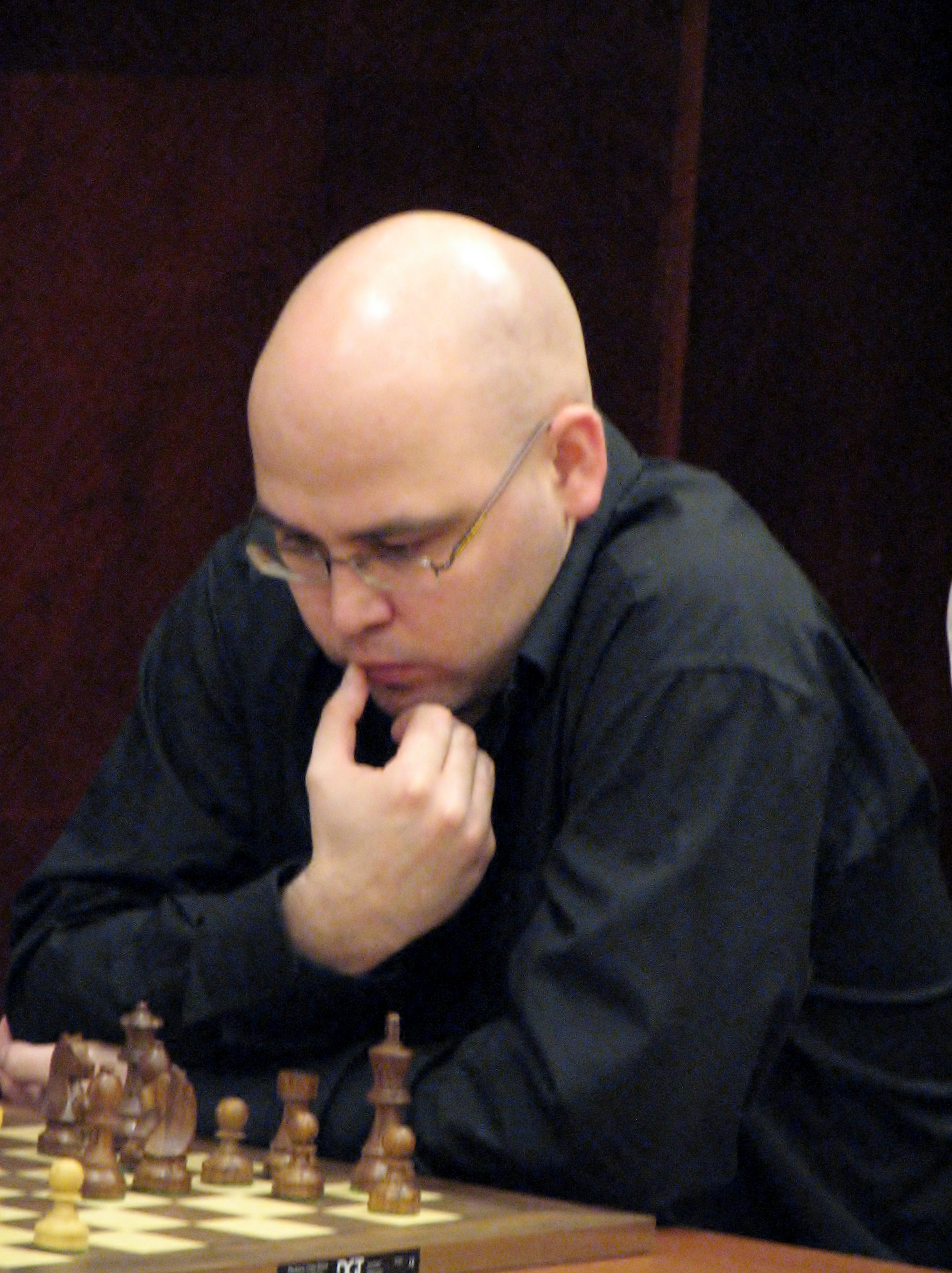
- Kanep in 2014

Personal information
- Born: 27 May 1983 (age 43) Võru, Võru County, then part of Estonian SSR, Soviet Union

Chess career
- Country: Estonia
- Title: Grandmaster (2006)
- Peak rating: 2537 (November 2010)

Meelis Kanep (born 27 May 1983) is an Estonian chess player who holds the FIDE title of Grandmaster (GM).

Born in Võru, Võru County, Kanep was the Estonian champion in 2004, 2005 and 2007 and winner of the Paul Keres Memorial Tournament in Tallinn, Estonia in 2005.
