= Salme Rootare =

Estonian chess player (1913–1987)

Personal information
- Born: March 26, 1913 Tallinn, Estonia
- Died: October 21, 1987 (aged 74)

Chess career
- Country: Estonia
- Title: Woman International Master (1957)

Salme Rootare (March 26, 1913, Tallinn – October 21, 1987) was an Estonian chess master.

She was fifteen times Estonian Champion (1945, 1948, 1949, 1950, 1954, 1956, 1957, 1960, 1962, 1964, 1966, 1969, 1970, 1971, and 1972).

Salme tied for 4-5th at Plovdiv 1959 (Candidates Tournament, Women's World Chess Championship). She beat Ludmilla Rudenko, the all-USSR women's champ 1950–1953, at least once, in 1956 in recorded tournament play, when Rudenko, believing she was would be mated on her next move, resigned. It wasn't until later that both players realised that Rudenko had a saving move.

She received the FIDE title of Woman International Master (WIM) in 1957.

Salme was married to Vidrik Rootare, known as Frits.
