= Tyavzino =

Coordinates: 59°23′15″N 28°12′23″E

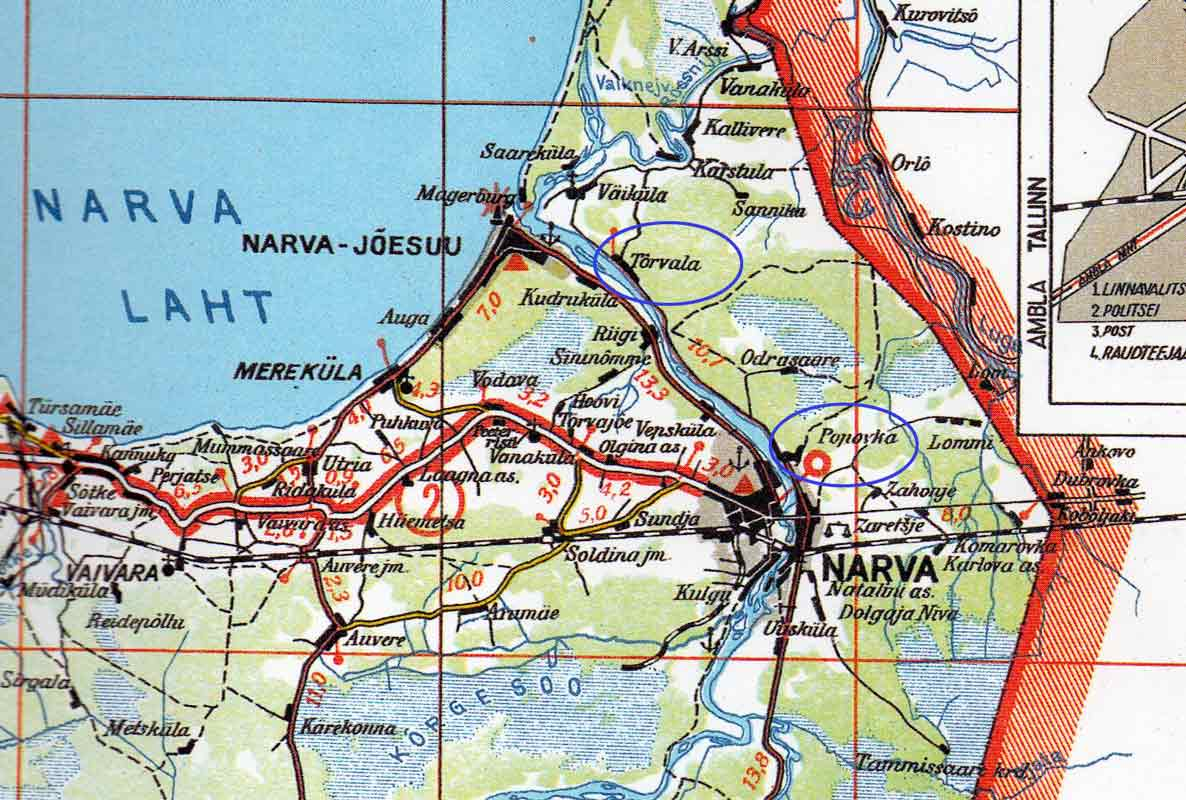
Two possible locations of Tyavzino: Popovka and Smolka (Tõrvala), on a map of Estonia from 1938.

Tyavzino (Russian: Тявзино, Swedish: Teusina, Finnish: Täyssinä) was a village in Russia, located east of the Narva River near Ivangorod. It was the place where the Treaty of Teusina ending the Russo-Swedish War of 1590–1595 between Russia and Sweden was signed. The village's exact location is uncertain.

== Location ==
According to Peter von Köppen, Tyavzino was the same village as the later Izvoz (Finnish: Tiensuu), located by the river Luga. However, according to Finnish linguist J. J. Mikkola (1935), contemporary (c. 15th–17th centuries) sources suggest that Tyavzino lay somewhere on the eastern bank of the Narva River closer to Ivangorod instead. He proposes that the village was located near modern Popovka. Former curator of the Narva Museum Jevgeni Krivošejev instead places Tyavzino at the site of the later village of Smolka (Estonian: Tõrvala), which was destroyed during World War II. Both Popovka and Smolka were part of Estonia between 1920 and 1944 within the wider area of Narvataguse.

== History ==
Tyavzino was first mentioned in 1498 as a village with seven farms, being one of two villages near the Ivangorod Fortress along with Zakhonye, which had three farms. It is mentioned again in 1571. Mikkola considered the name Tyavzino to be etymologically related to that of Töysä, a parish in South Ostrobothnia, Finland.

In 1595, the Russo-Swedish War of 1590–1595 was concluded with the Treaty of Teusina signed in Tyavzino. The village appears to have been of strategic importance, as a Swedish peace offer made in 1616 during the Ingrian War would have allowed Russia to keep most of Ingria, but specifically mentions Teusina as a village to be ceded to Sweden. When Ingria was under Swedish rule (1617–1721), the name Teusina was used alongside names such as Ahlakylä and Alanekylä, the latter being transcriptions of a Finnic toponym Alakylä (lit. 'lower village'). On a Swedish map of Ingria from 1704, the village of Alanekylä was shown at a crossroads connecting a road running along the Narva to one leading to Keykino. A village by this name existed on the eastern bank of the Narva as late as 1827, when it was mentioned as Alakyla, after which it disappears sometime in the 19th century.

While the area was part of Estonia, a new settlement by the name of Alaküla appears in censuses after 1922. In 1943, Alaküla had 50 inhabitants, mainly Ingrian Finns.
