= Popovka, Leningrad Oblast =

Popovka Поповка
- Khutor
- Location within Leningrad Oblast Location within Russia
- Coordinates: 59°23′32″N 28°12′16″E
- Country: Russia
- Region: Leningrad Oblast
- District: Kingiseppsky District
- Urban settlement: Ivangorod Urban Settlement

Population (2021)
  - Total: 2
- Time zone: UTC+3:00

Popovka (Russian: Поповка) is a rural locality (a khutor) in the Ivangorod Urban Settlement of Kingiseppsky District, Leningrad Oblast, Russia. It is located on the eastern bank of the Narva River, north of the town of Ivangorod. As of 2021, the population was estimated to be 2.

According to Finnish linguist J. J. Mikkola, Popovka is located near the site of the village of Tyavzino, where the Treaty of Teusina between Russia and Sweden was signed in 1595.

After the Treaty of Tartu between Estonia and Soviet Russia was signed in 1920, the eastern bank of the Narva River (Narvataguse) became part of Estonia, remaining so until 1944. During this time, Popovka was administratively part of the Narva Parish. On 1 March 1920, Popovka had a population of 178, of whom 141 were ethnic Russians and 37 were Estonians.

Popovka was largely destroyed during World War II. Nowadays, there are garden allotments near the settlement.
