= Ivangorod Fortress =

Castle in Ivangorod, Leningrad Oblast, Russia

- Ивангородская крепость
- Ivangorod, Russia
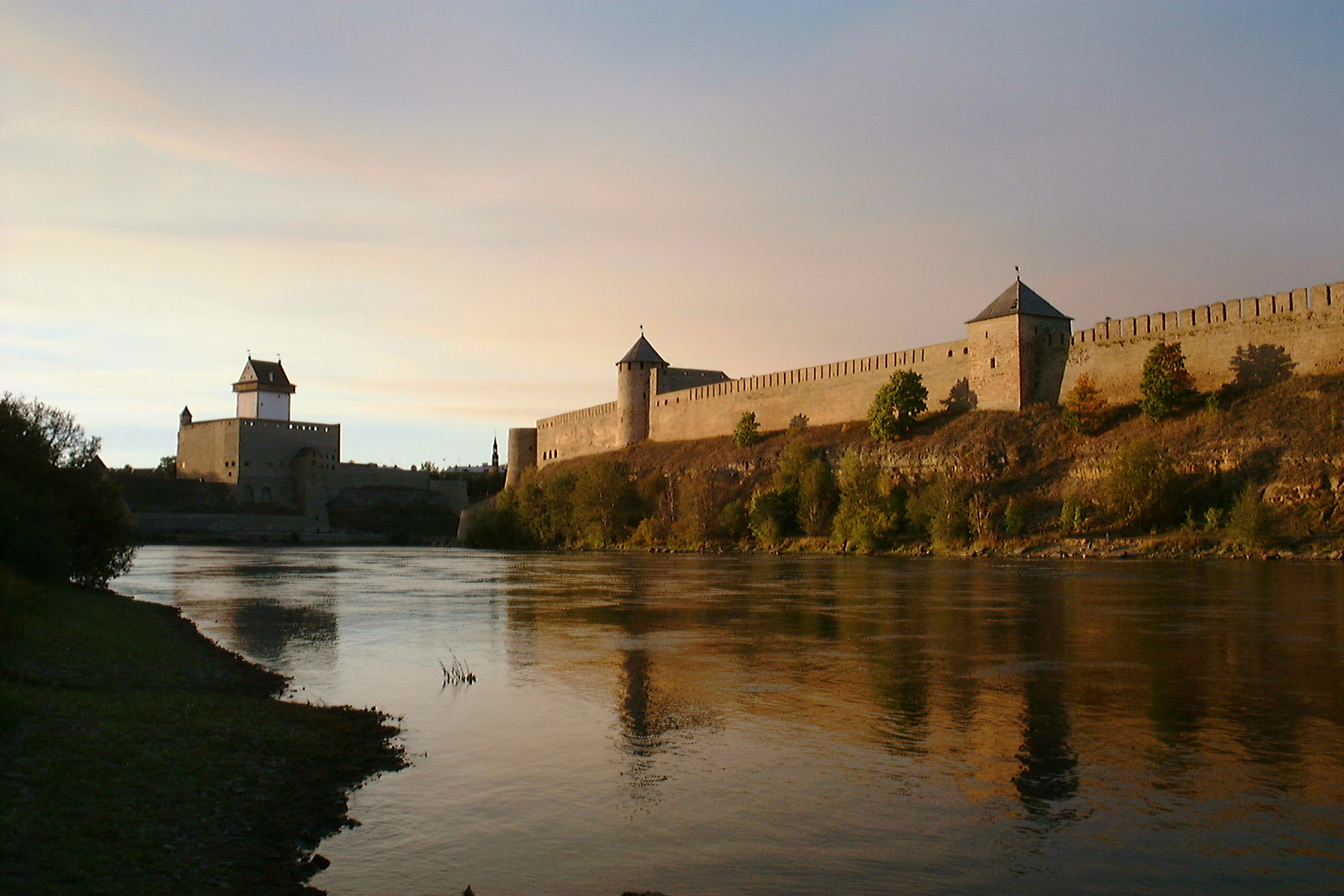
- The Narva river, with the Ivangorod Fortress in Russia on the right, and the reconstructed Hermann Castle in Estonia on the left

Location
- Coordinates: 59°22′30″N 28°12′27″E

Site history
- Built: 1492
- Battles/wars: Assault on Ivangorod; Russo-Swedish War (1495–1497); Livonian War; Russo-Swedish War (1590–1595); Time of Troubles; Great Northern War; World War I World War II

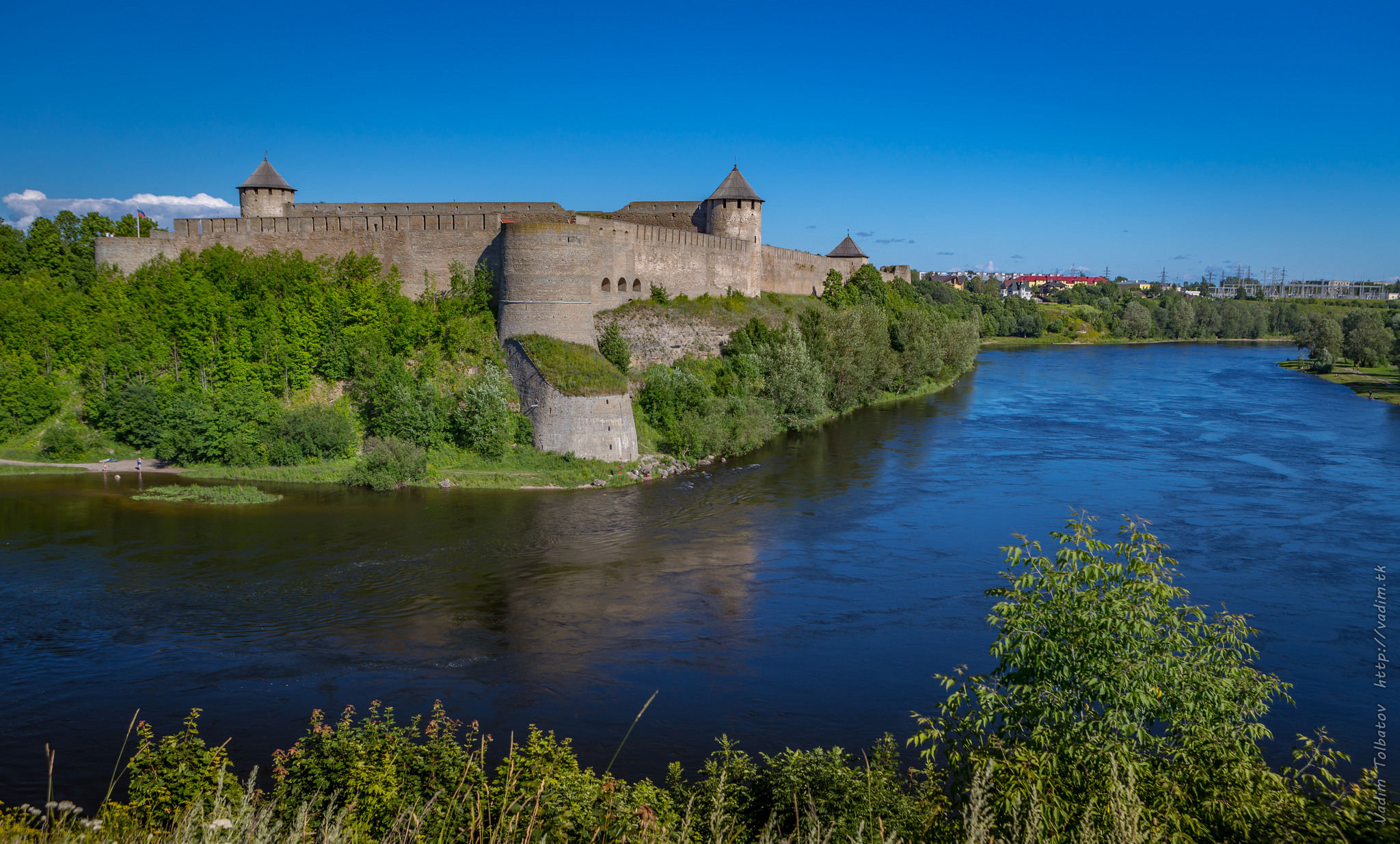
View of Ivangorod Fortress from the opposite riverbank in Narva, Estonia

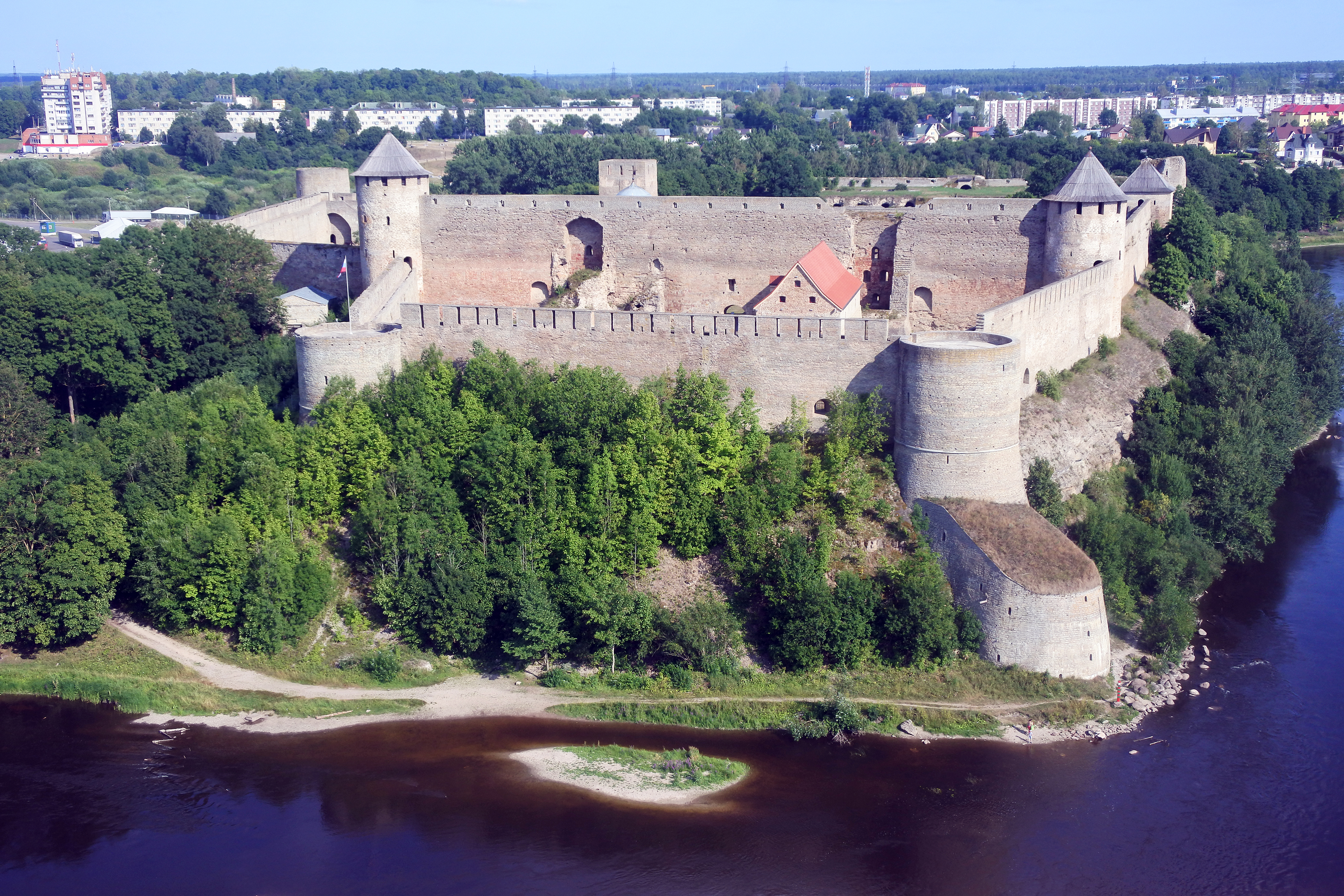
Ivangorod Fortress on the Narva river

Ivangorod Fortress (Russian: Ивангородская крепость; Estonian: Jaanilinna linnus; Votic: Jaanilidna) is a castle in Ivangorod, Leningrad Oblast, Russia. It was built in the 15th century. It is located on the east bank of the Narva River, which currently forms the international border between Russia and Estonia, across from the city of Narva in Estonia.

Ivangorod Fortress was established during the reign of Ivan III in 1492, intended to reaffirm Muscovy's access to the Baltic Sea and to form a bulwark against the Teutonic Order, being built opposite the powerful Teutonic Hermann Castle. The fortress eventually grew into the town of Ivangorod, and the structures of the fort were gradually expanded and strengthened. Ivangorod Fortress was controlled by Sweden after the end of the Livonian War in 1583, changing hands numerous times during conflicts and border shifts over the following centuries. Following World War I, the fortress was used as a prisoner of war repatriation camp from 1920-21. After World War II, the fortress returned to permanent Russian rule through the Soviet Union. Ivangorod Fortress is now a museum and a tourist attraction.

== History ==
The original castle was constructed in one summer, in the year 1492. It was named after Muscovite Grand Prince Ivan III. Its purpose was to fend off the Livonian Knights. The castle is strictly quadrilateral, measuring 1,600 m^{2} (17,000 ft^{2}), with walls 14 metres (46 ft) tall.

Ivangorod was won back from the Livonian Order later in the year by Muscovite forces under the command of Prince Ivan Gundar and Mikhail Klyapin. Three thousand troops arrived to retake the castle, rebuild it, and construct a new barracks and stronger bastions. For almost 10 years, the land around the castle was in constant warfare. The fortress and the land around changed hands repeatedly. The castle was reconstructed and fortified many times, becoming one of the strongest defensive structures in the 16th century. The castle was in development until the 17th century, becoming a large, sprawling fortress with several lines of defence.

The Treaty of Teusina (1595) returned the fortress to Russia. In 1612, the Swedish Empire conquered the fortress, which was defended by a voivode, Fyodor Aminev (b 1560s, d 1628) and his sons. By the Treaty of Stolbova, Ingria was ceded to Gustav II Adolf, king of Sweden. In 1704, Peter the Great captured the castle from Swedish troops, bringing the fortress back into Russian control. Inside the fortress, there are two churches: one is dedicated to the Virgin's Assumption (1496) and the other to St Nicholas (built in the late 16th century but later reconstructed).

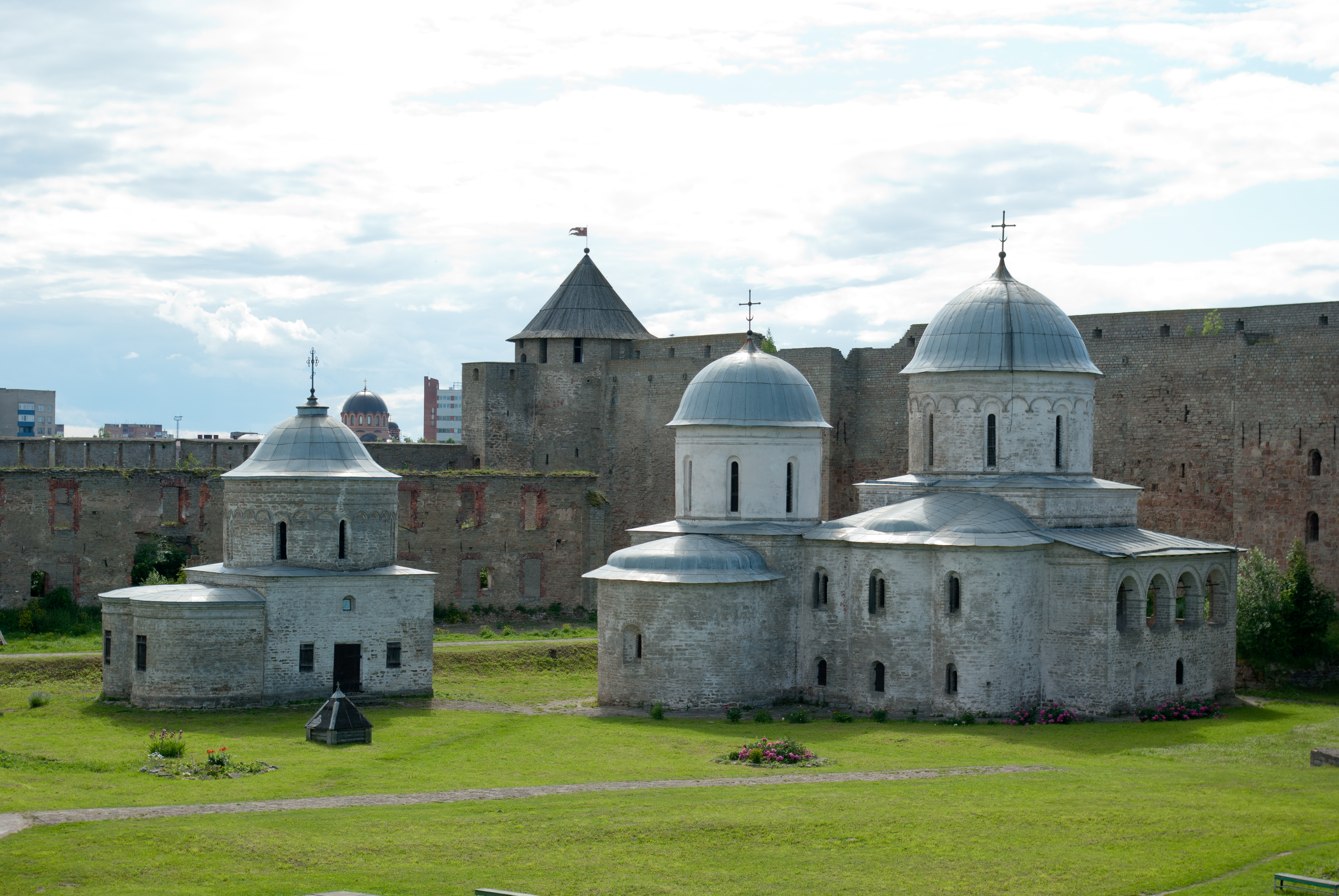
The churches of St Nicholas (1498) and the Virgin's Dormition (1558) inside the fortress walls

After the early 18th century, the military role of the fortress dwindled due to technological advances. In 1728, a review was carried out of the fortresses in this area, which concluded that the installation had been neglected, and had a low fighting efficiency. An order was issued for restoration of the Ivangorod fortress, but after the inspection of 1738 the fortress was designated not adequate for defence purposes.

In 1840, some improvements were carried out in the fortress (roofs were renewed), and further improvements took place in 1863 and 1911–1914. During World War I, the fortress was captured by the Germans on 25 February 1918. The Imperial Russian Army had been relying on it and similar fortresses to halt the Imperial German Army advance during the Great Retreat, but they ended up outmatched against modern military technologies such as heavy artillery. From 1919 to 1940, the fortress belonged to Estonia. During 1920 - 1921, the fortress was used as transit camp for former POWs being repatriated to Germany and to Russia. Despite changing hands several times in the first half of the 20th century, the fortress played no significant role in fighting.

During World War II, after the Soviet invasion and annexation of Estonia in 1940, the fortress was first controlled by the USSR (1940–1941) and then by Nazi Germany (1941–1944), which established two POW camps within the fortress and left many of its buildings damaged after their retreat. In January 1945 Soviet authorities defined the Narva river as the new administrative border between the Estonian SSR and Russian SFSR, and as a result the Ivangorod fortress transferred from Narva to the Kingiseppsky District of Leningrad Oblast. In August 1991, after the restoration of the independent Republic of Estonia, the town and fortress remained with Russian SFSR, and thereafter with the Russian Federation after the dissolution of the Soviet Union in December 1991. Currently, the fortress serves as a museum.

== The museum ==
The history and art museum of the Ivangorod fortress exhibits paintings of Ivan Bilibin, Alexandra Shchekotikhina-Pototskaya and other artists. Also, local history and tradition are explained by some of the museum's exhibits, such as archeological finds encountered in the surrounding areas. There is a permanent exhibition devoted to the Great Northern War and the Livonian War. As well, there are models of fortresses in the surrounding region and armaments, and documents and letters related to famous people such as Fyodor Dostoyevsky, exhibited in the fortress museum.

== Gallery ==
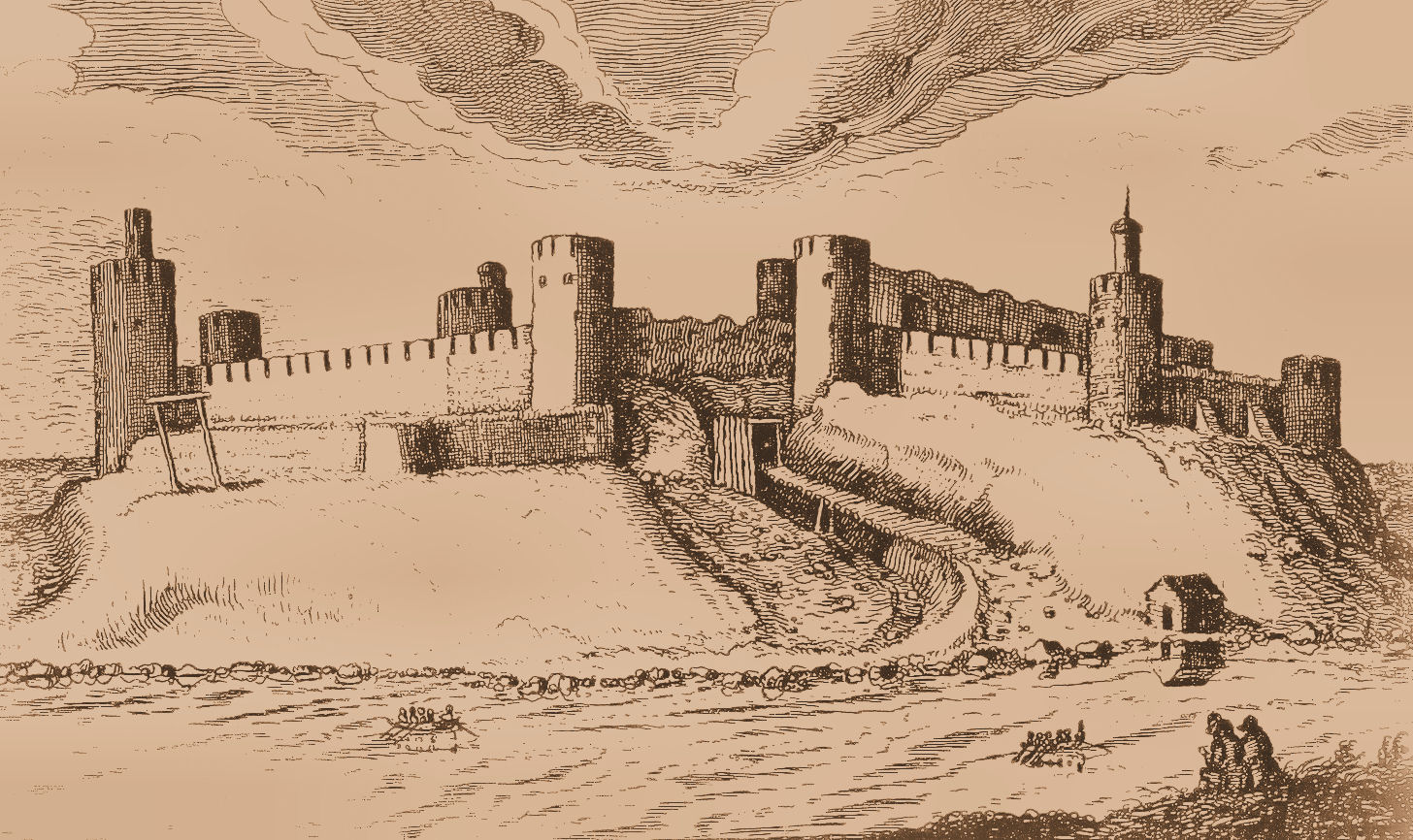
Ivangorod Fortress in 1616

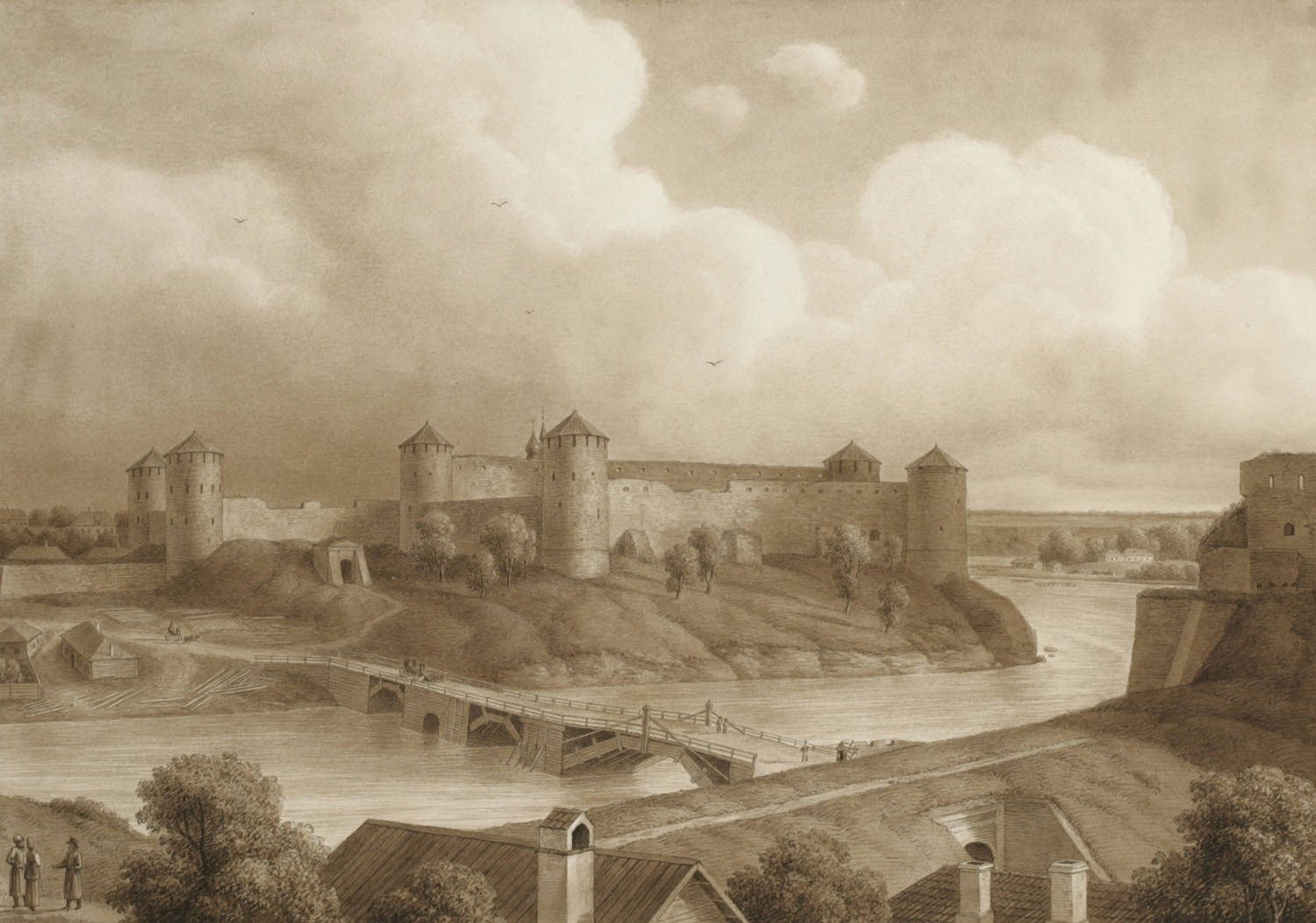
Ivangorod Fortress at the beginning of the 19th century

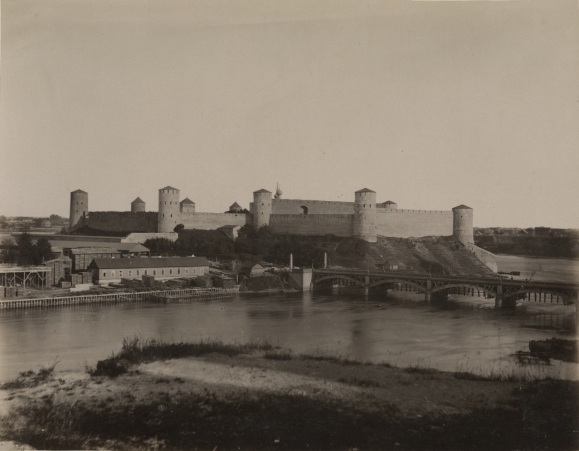
Ivangorod fortress and bridge at the end of the 19th century

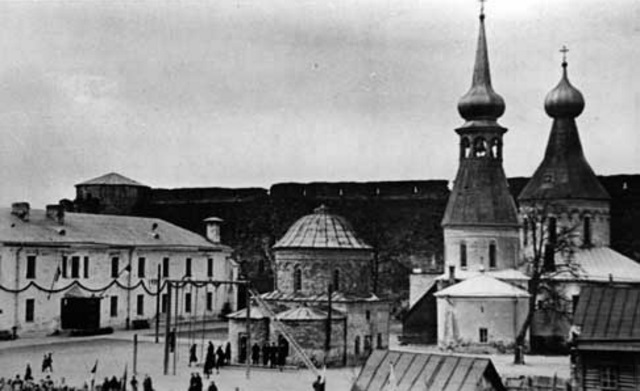
Churches in Ivangorod Fortress. Beginning of 20th century.

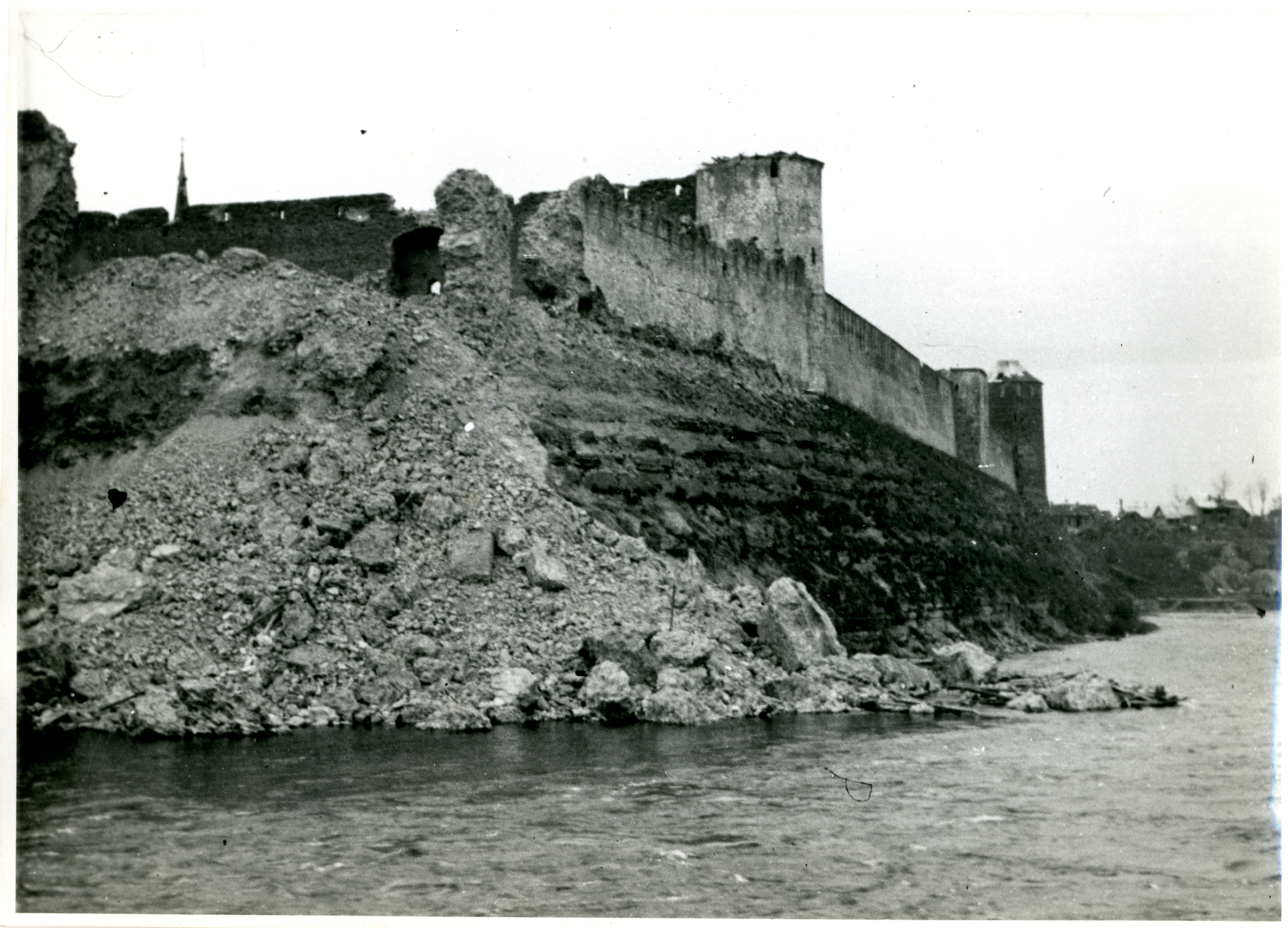
Ivangorod Fortress in 1944

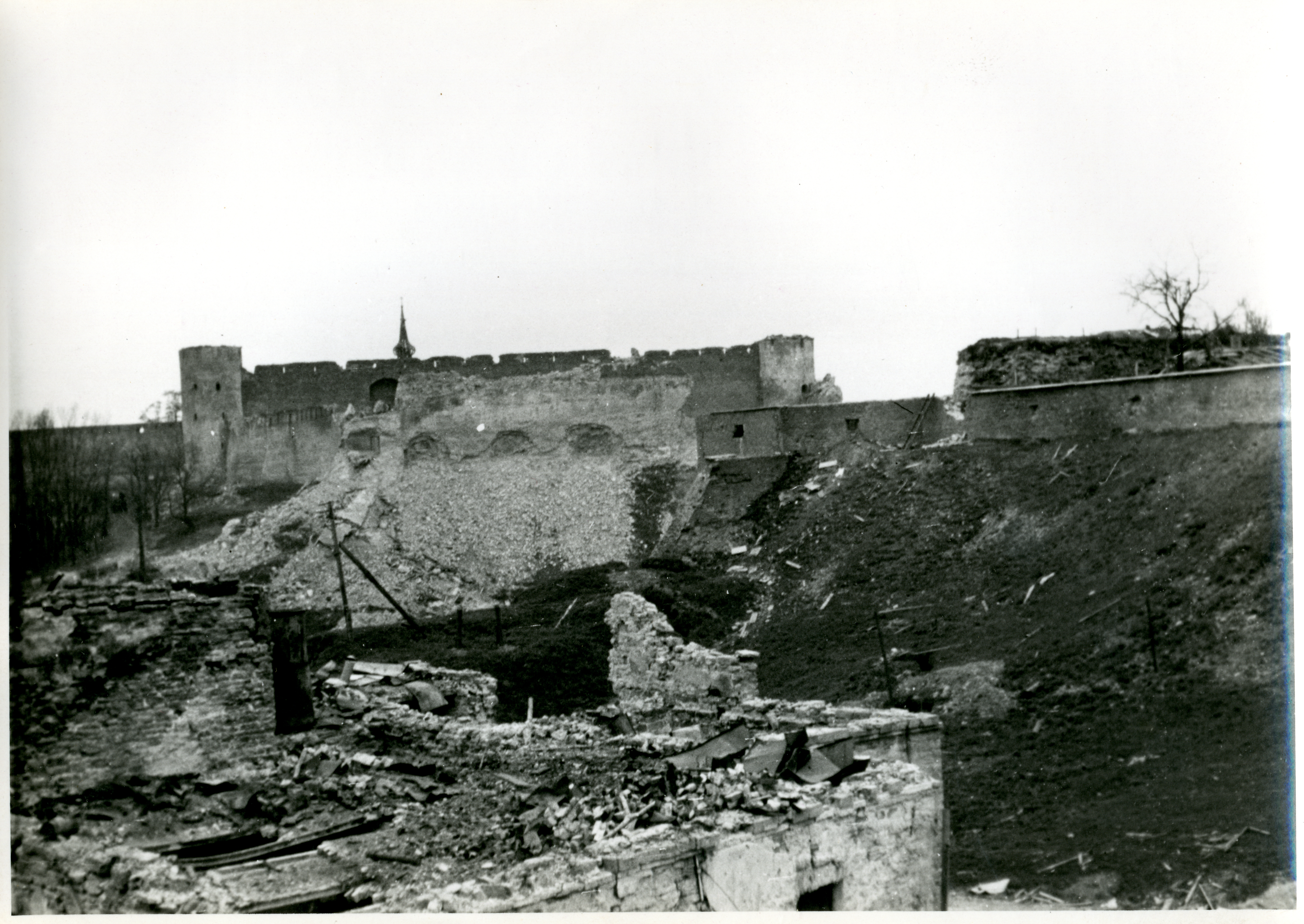
Ivangorod Fortress in 1944

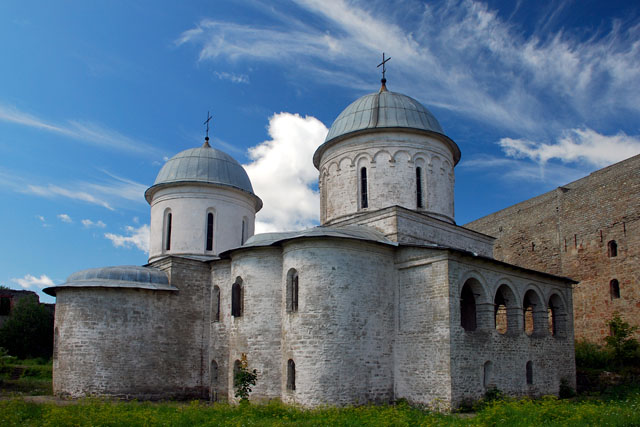
Assumption Cathedral

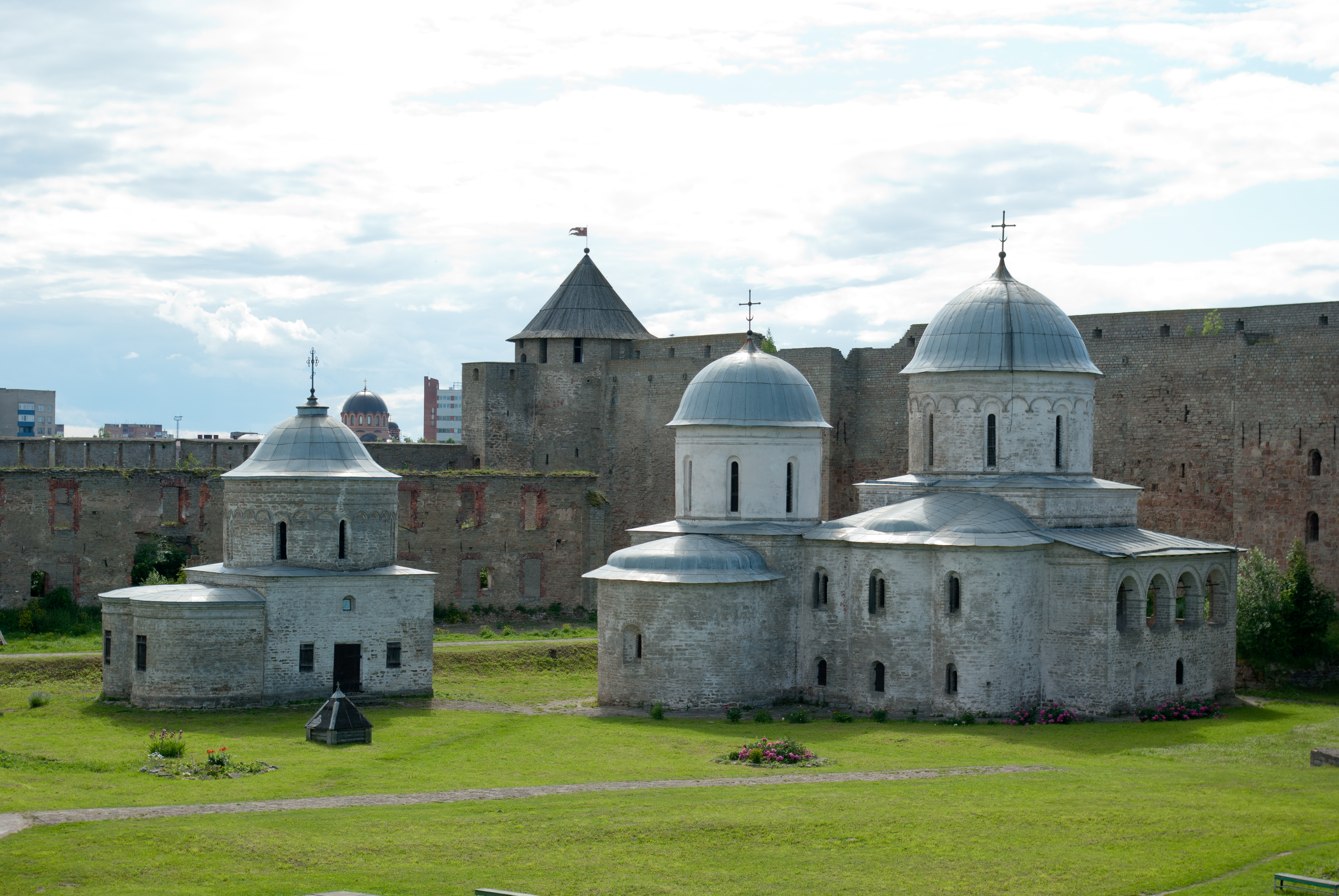
Assumption and Nikolskaya churches on the territory of the fortress

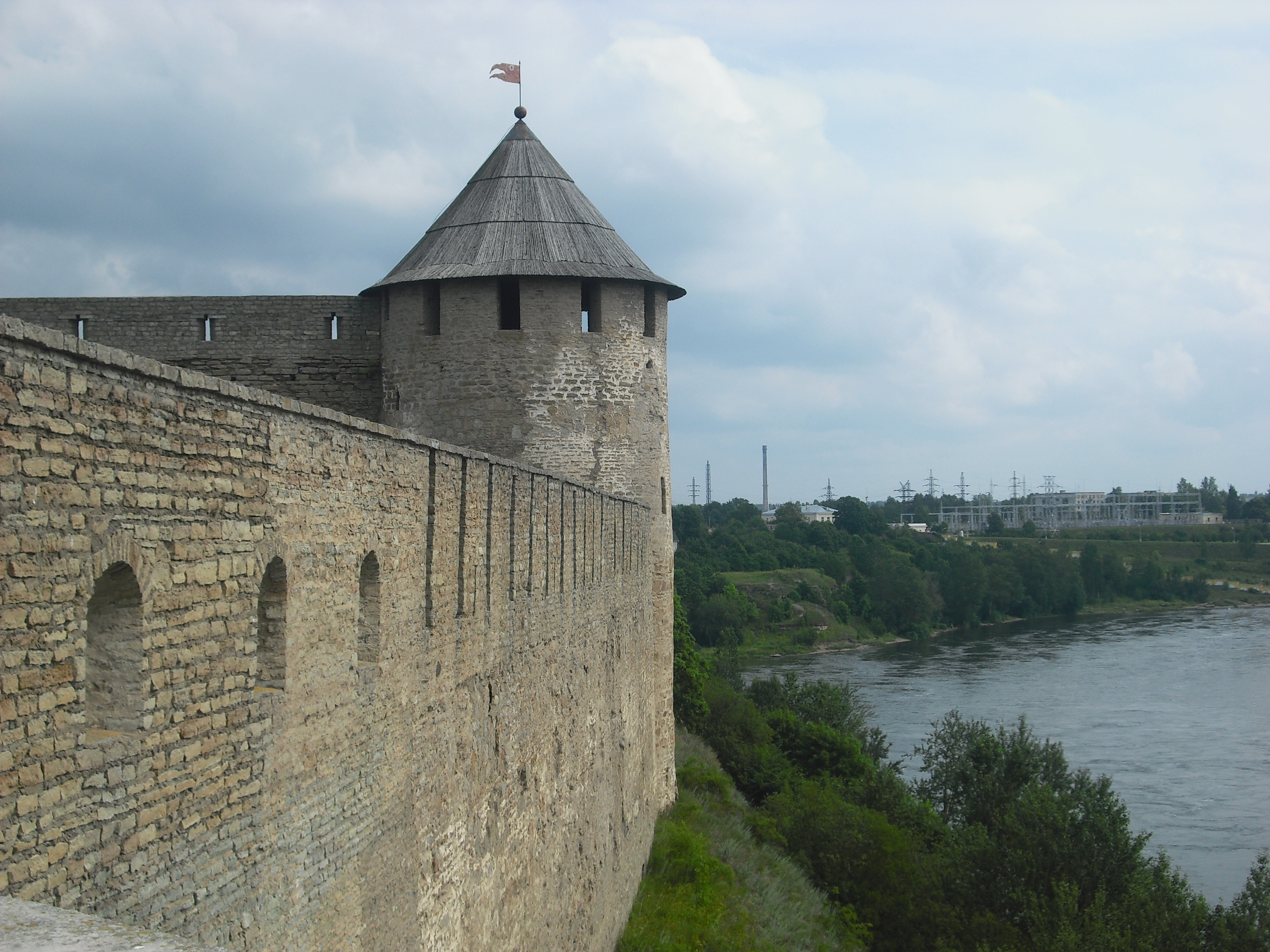
Provision tower

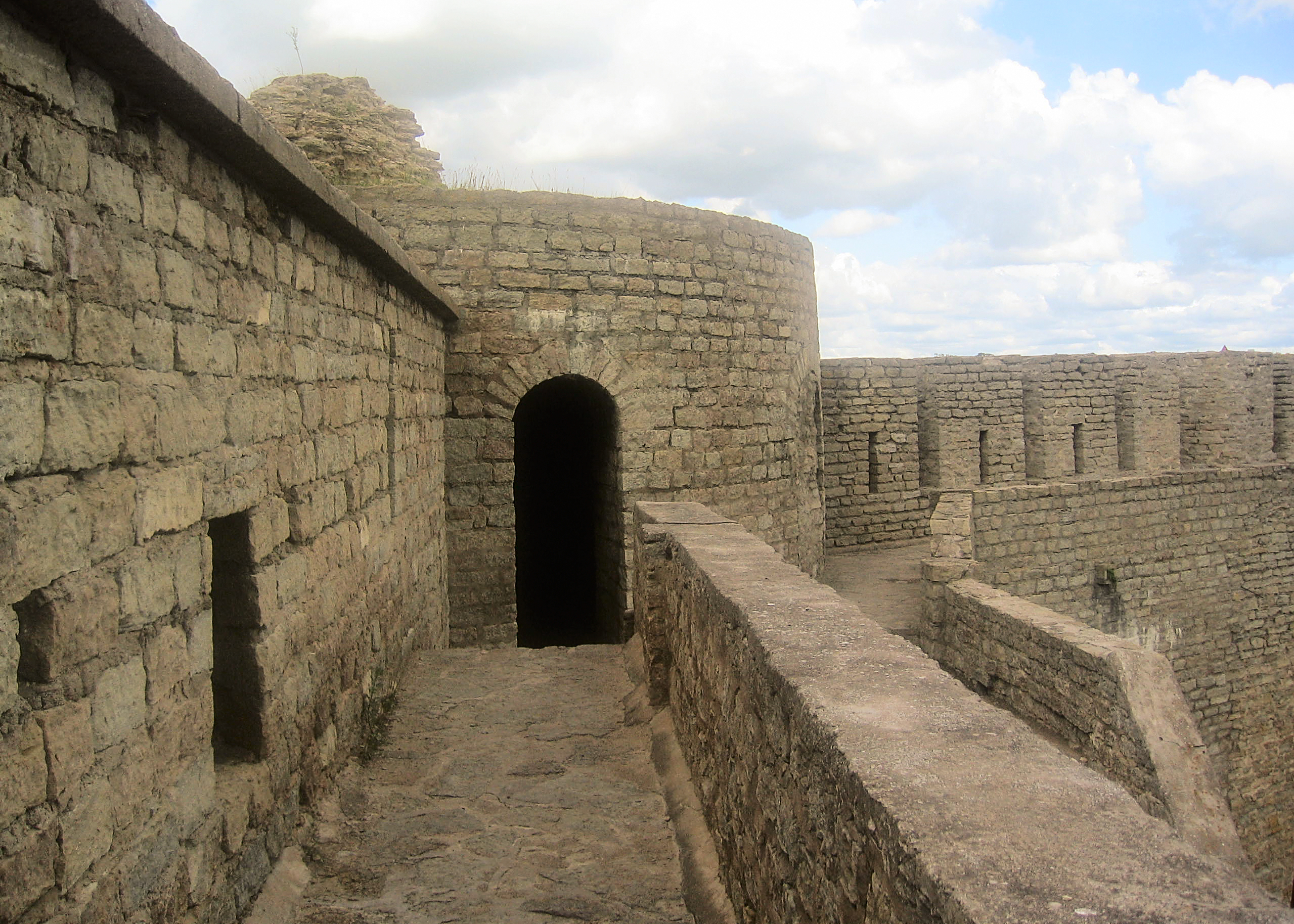
Local Tower

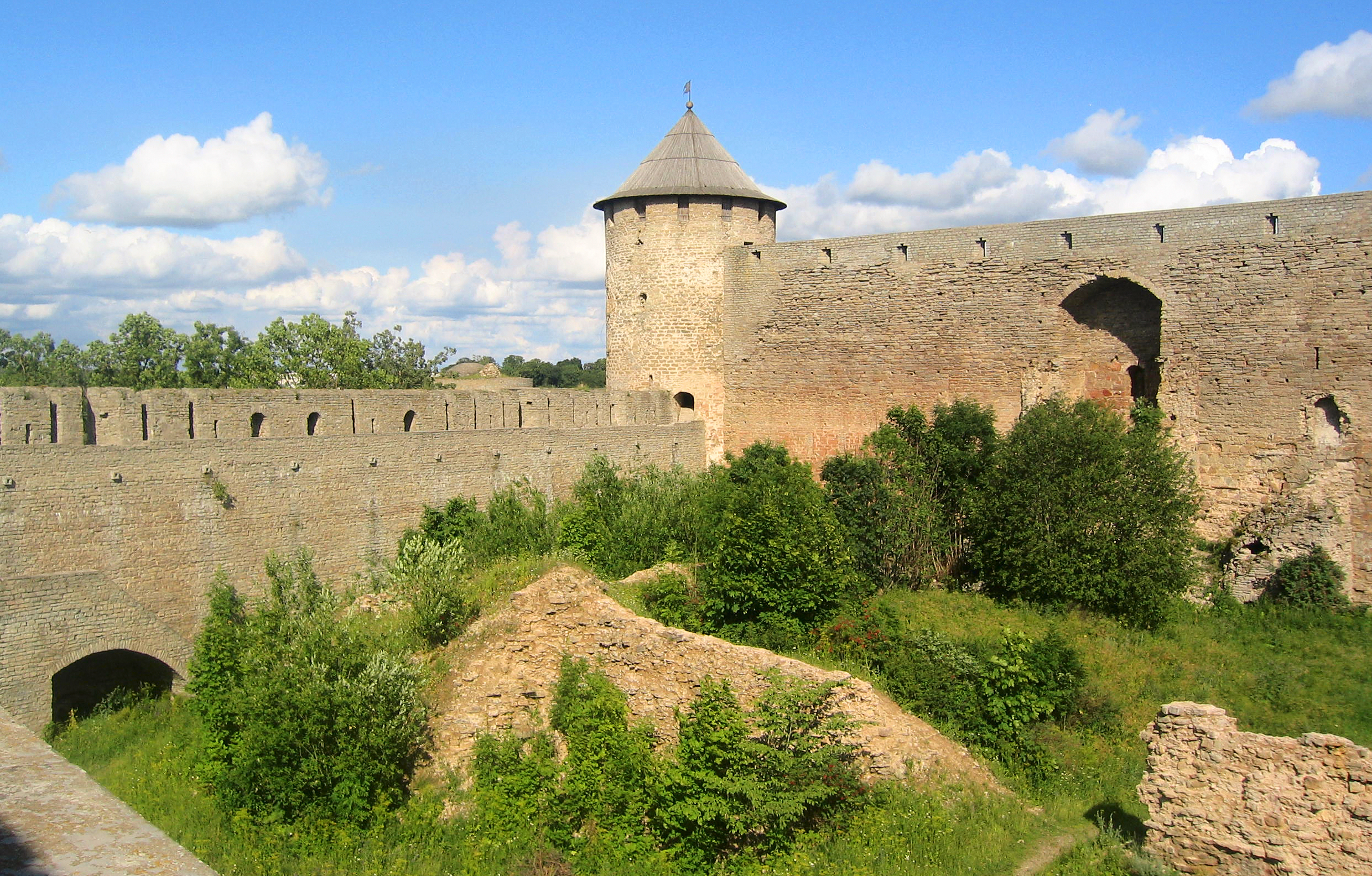
The Gate Tower from the Castle side in 2007

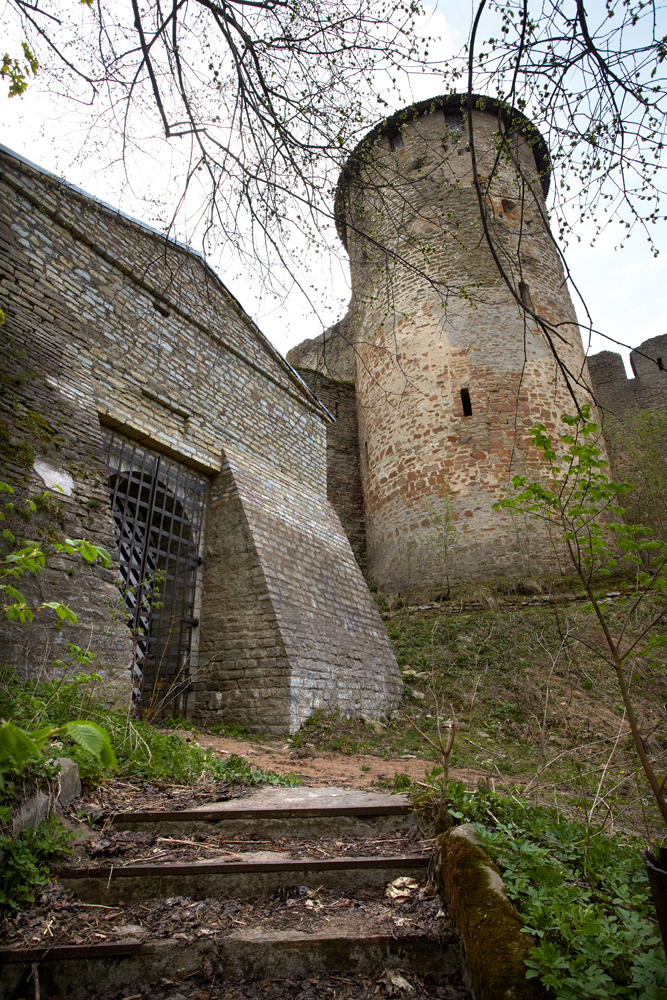
Gate Tower and Kolyvan Gate

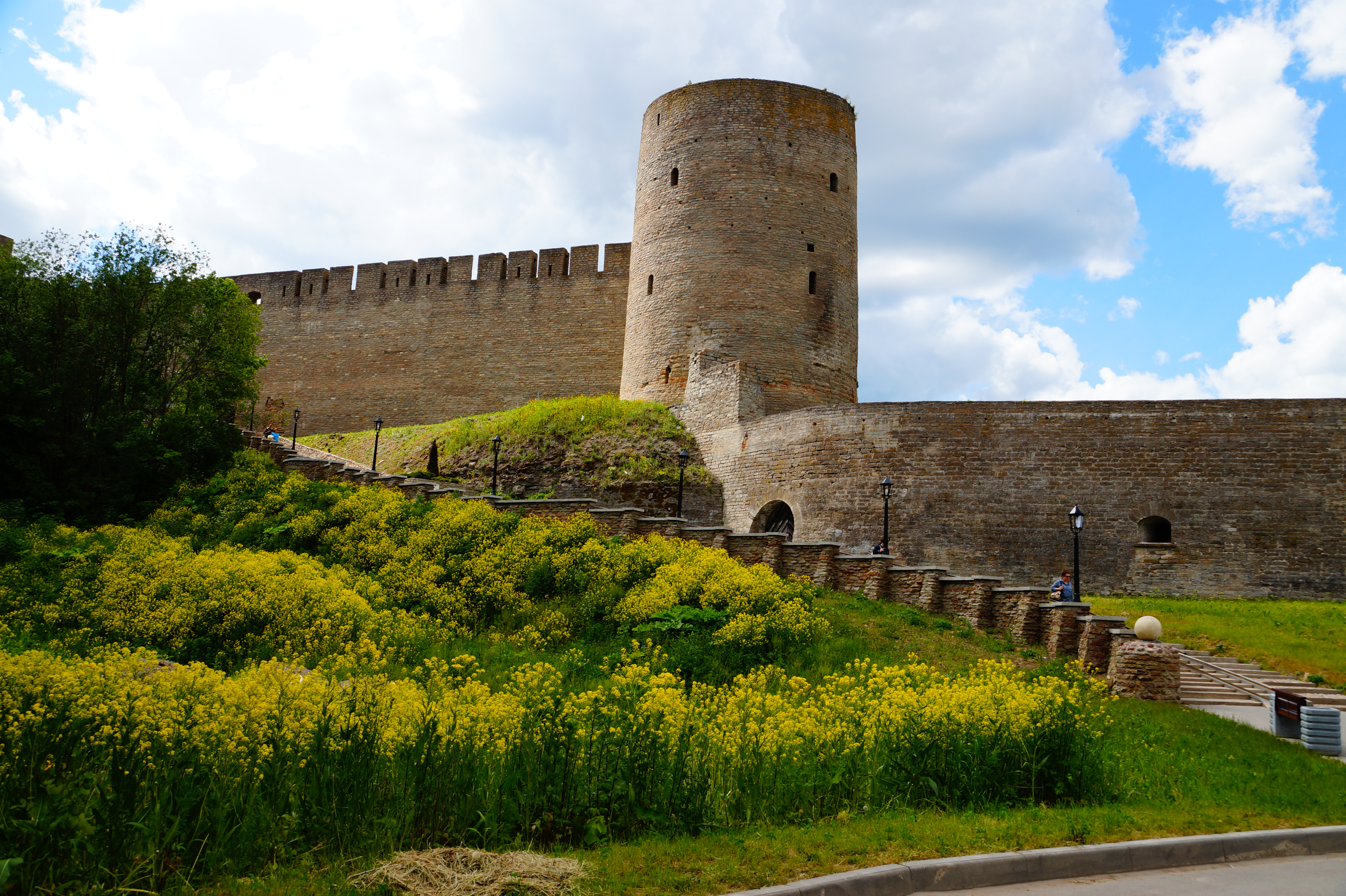
Long-neck tower and stairs to the fortress

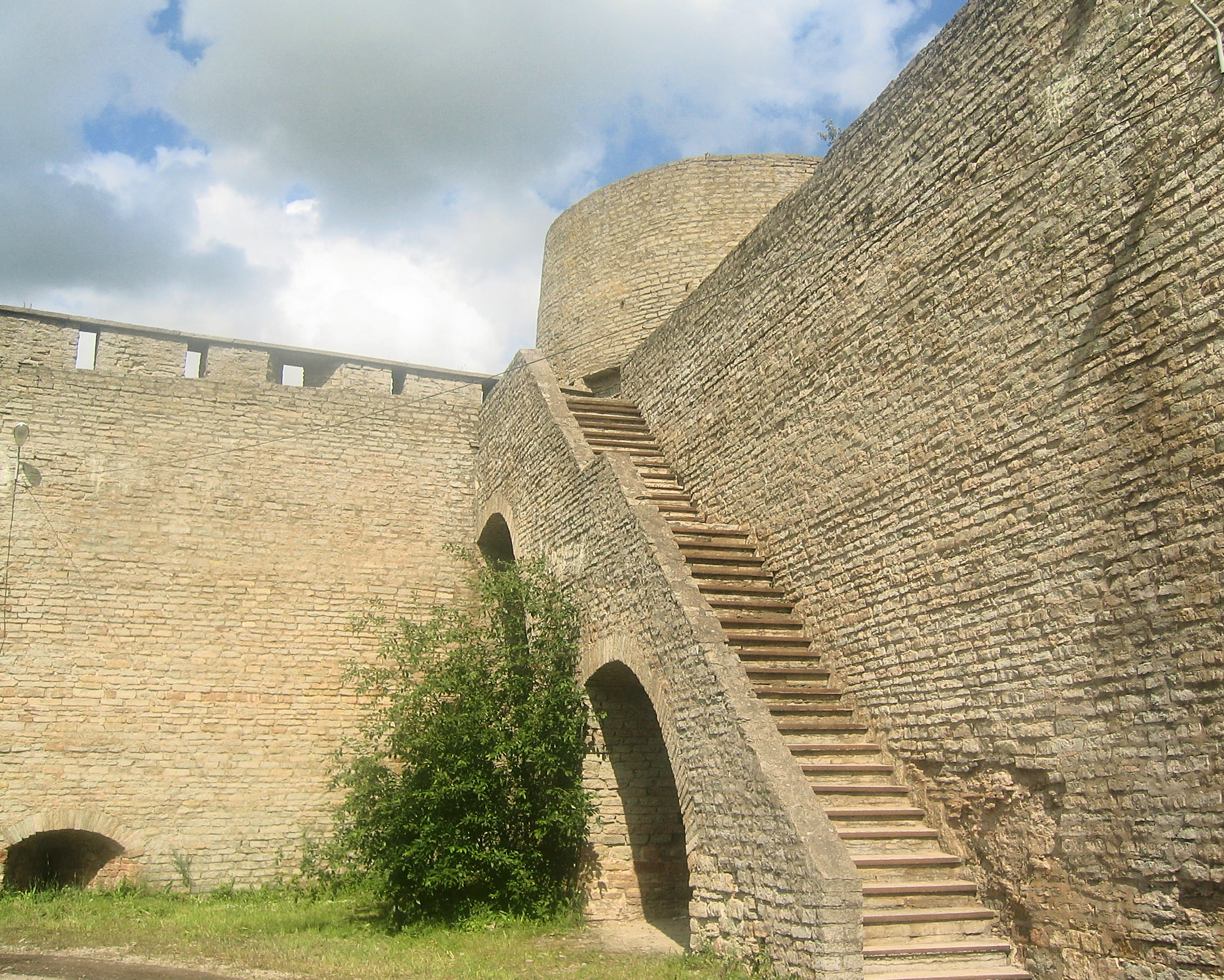
Long-neck tower, view from the fortress

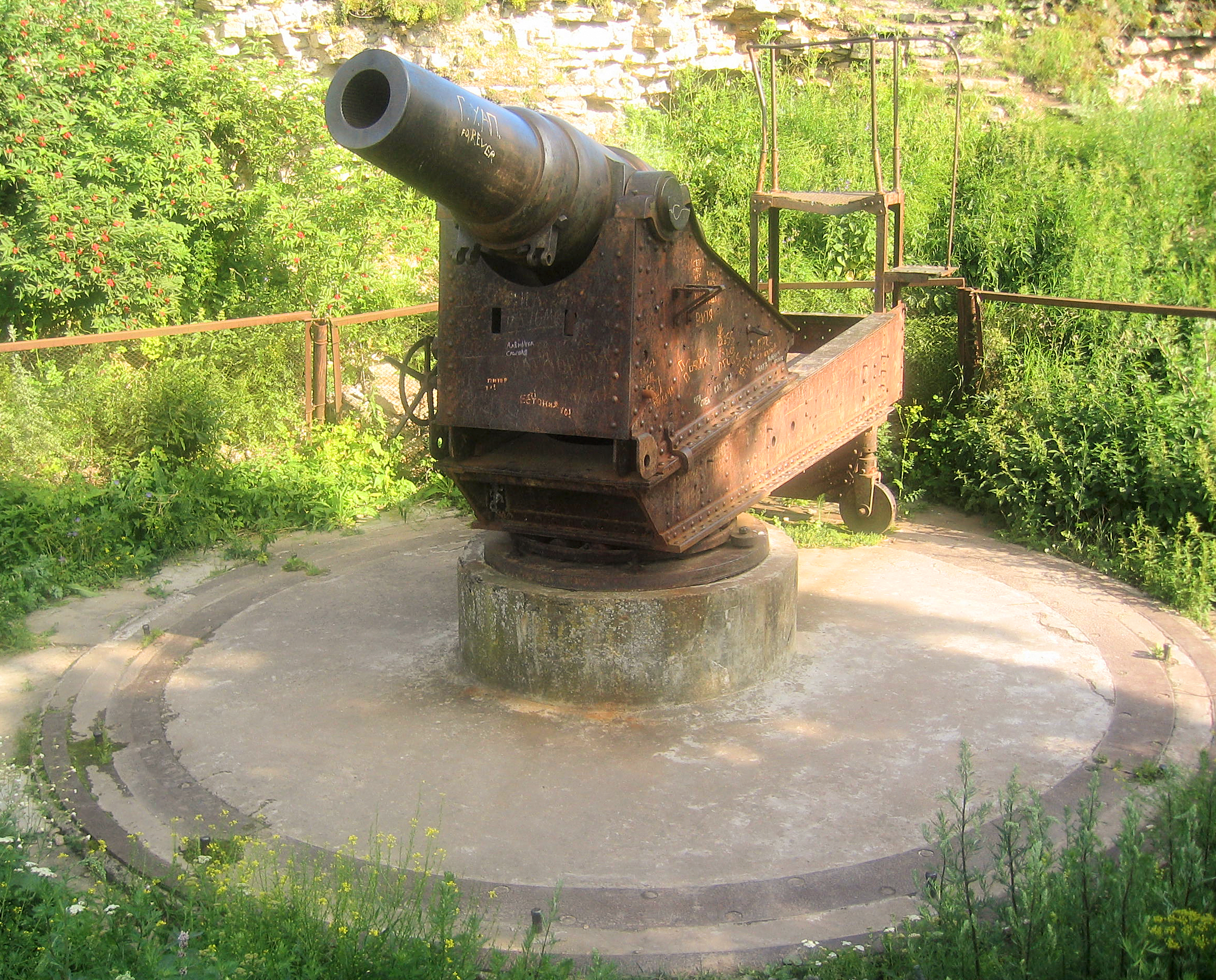
1891 howitzer

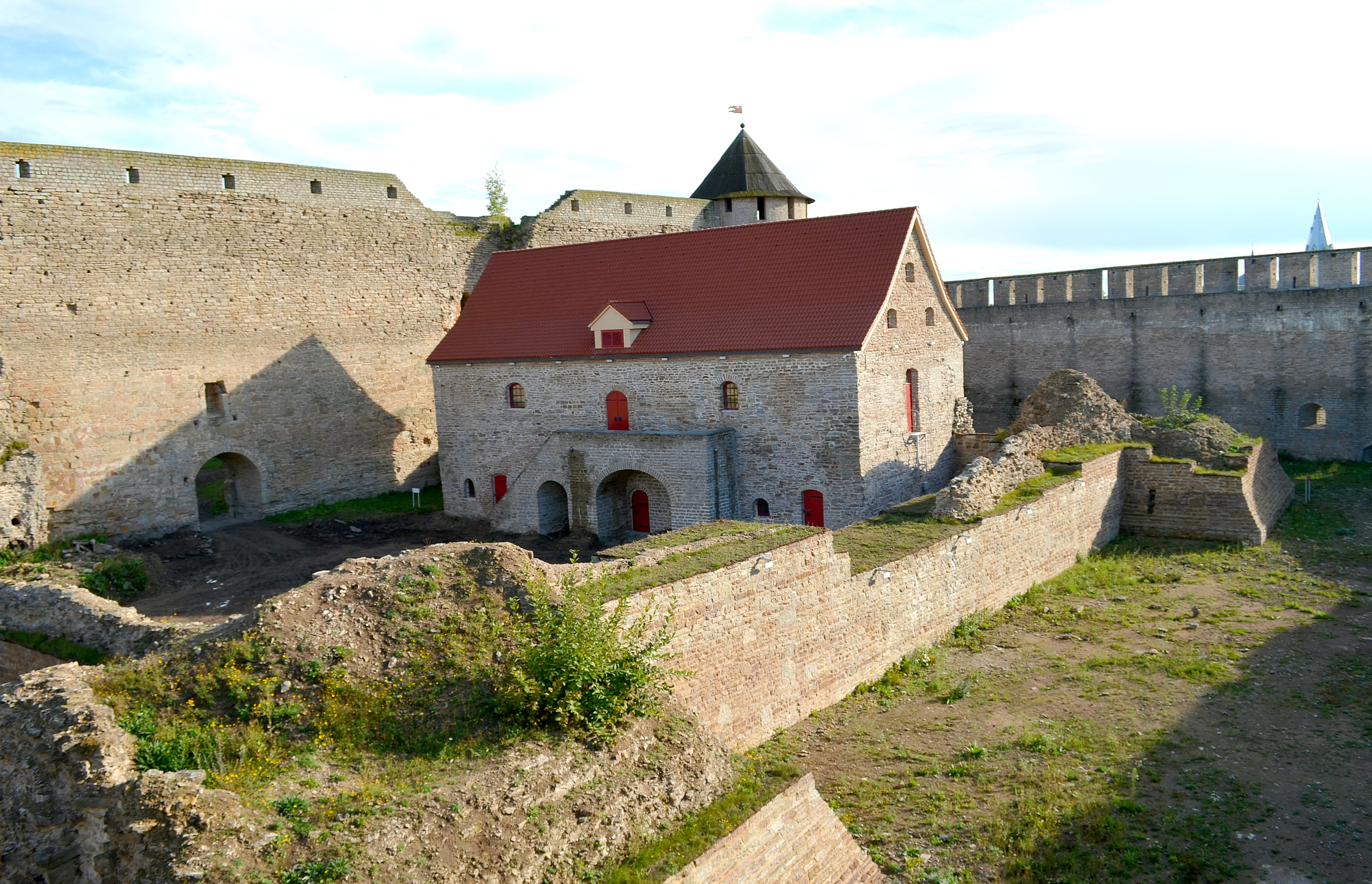
Gunpowder storehouse on the territory of the fortress

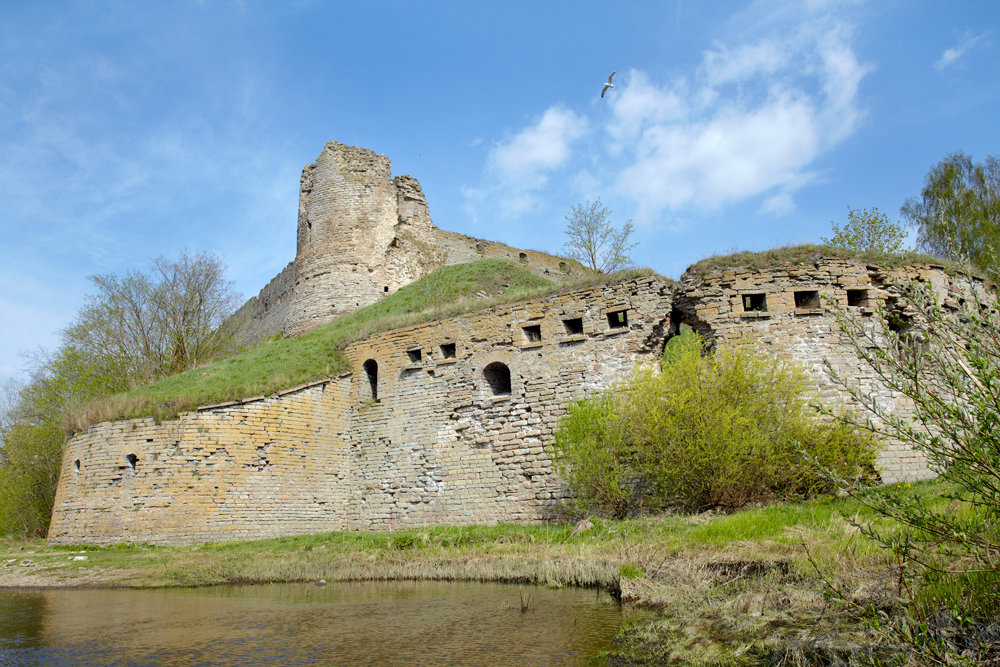
Hiding place and caponier

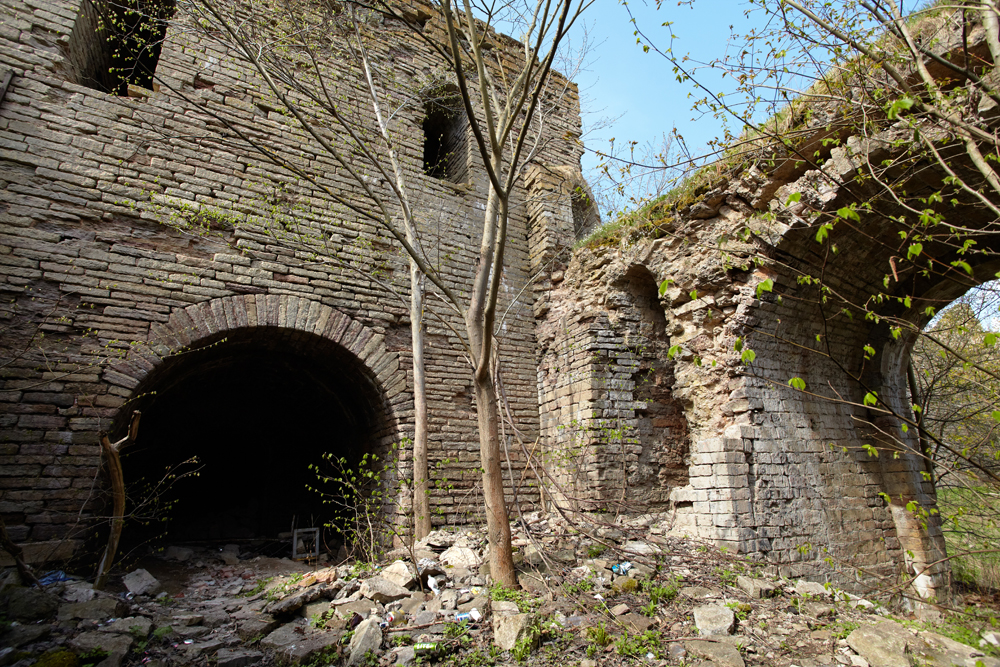
Diversion tower

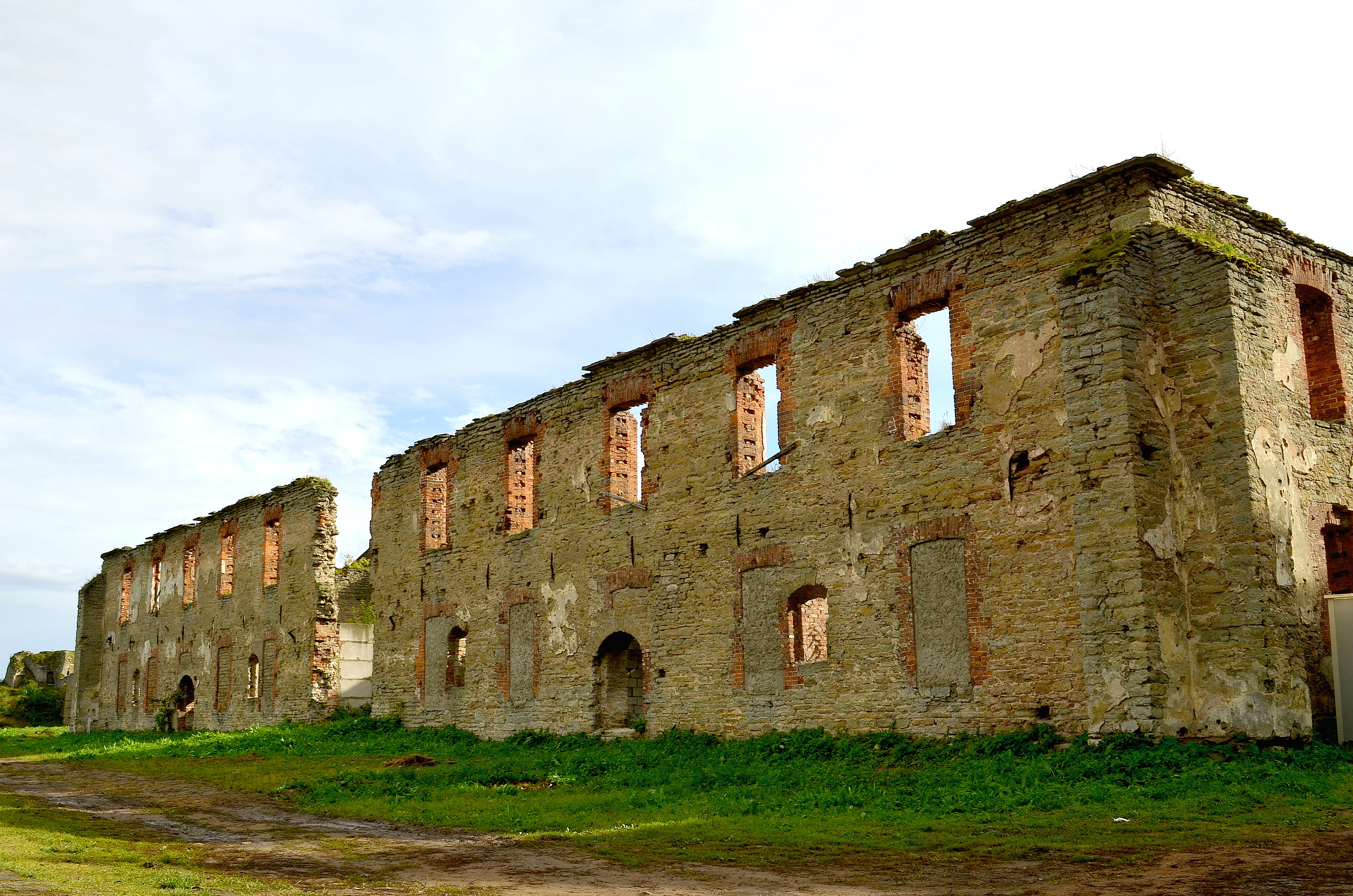
Barn in the fortress
