= Treaty of Teusina =

1595 peace treaty between Russia and Sweden

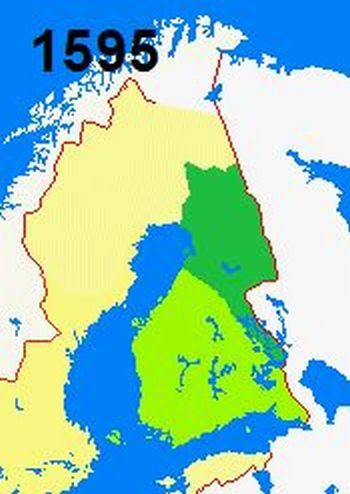
Swedish borders after the Treaty of Teusina

The Treaty of Teusina (Finnish: Täyssinän rauha, Russian: Тявзинский мирный договор) was concluded by Russian diplomats under the boyar Afanasiy Pushkin and ambassadors of the Swedish king at the village of Tyavzino (Finnish: Täyssinä, Swedish: Teusina) in Ingria on 18 May 1595 to end the Russo-Swedish War (1590–1595).

The treaty revised provisions of the Truce of Plussa in 1583. It restored all territory ceded to Sweden back to Russia, except for Narva. Russia received Kexholm County with Korela Fortress and most of Ingria, with the towns of Ivangorod, Yama, Koporye. The treaty restored the borders predating the Livonian War. The Swedish-Russian border was delineated from the outstream of the Systerbäck river into the Gulf of Finland, over the lakes Saimaa and Inari, the settlement of Neiden and up to the Barents Sea. Russia had to renounce all claims on Estonia, including Narva, and they had to accept Swedish sovereignty over Estonia.

== Background ==
=== The Armistice of 1593 ===
Sweden and Russia had signed a truce two years prior after the death of John III of Sweden. The Swedes were suing for peace due to the loss of their king, and worries over the status of the Swedish army stationed in Estonia due to a lack of funds.

==== The Swedish power struggle and the Russian hegemony ====
Sigismund, a son of the Polish king John I, was named as the new king in Sweden. However, the nation was soon in inner turmoil caused by a power struggle between the new king and his uncle and future king Charles IX.

Russia was ruled by Tsar Fyodor I Ivanovich, but the de facto power was held by the future tsar and current advisor to the tsar, Boris Godunov.

===== Swedish goals =====
King Sigismund stated, that the minimal demands set by the Swedes would be a return to pre-war borders, and gain some compensation over territories.

The negotiations were held, with the Russian delegation using the Swedish power struggle to their advantage and threatening to abandon negotiations. The final agreement was reached in May 1595.

== Peace Agreement ==
1. Russia will relinquish all claims on the territory on the west side of the river Narva (Estonia).
2. Sweden will abandon the occupied territories of Kexholm and Ingria.

Other details in the agreement included an exchange of prisoners without ransom, the safety of Russian citizens and their property, and that Russian foreign trade was to be handled through Swedish cities Viborg and Reval, and not from Narva or the Russian ports on the Baltic Sea.

== Aftermath ==
The peace treaty was commercially beneficial to Sweden, due to designating Vyborg and Narva as international hubs for trade. Russia managed to avoid handling their trade through the Swedish territories.

The Treaty of Teusina ended a 25 year period of destructive war. Tens of thousands of civilians were killed, which at that time was a much larger portion of the total population in the regions the war was waged on.

The borders set in the peace treaty remained as such for 22 years, until the Treaty of Stolbovo in 1617.

== See also ==
- List of treaties
- Treaty of Stolbovo
- Ingrian War

== Sources ==
- Perrie, Maureen (2002). Pretenders and Popular Monarchism in Early Modern Russia. The False Tsars of the Time and Troubles. Cambridge University Press. p. 24. ISBN 0-521-89101-9.
