= Ivangorod =

Town in Leningrad Oblast, Russia

Ivangorod Ивангород Jaanilinn (Estonian)
- Town
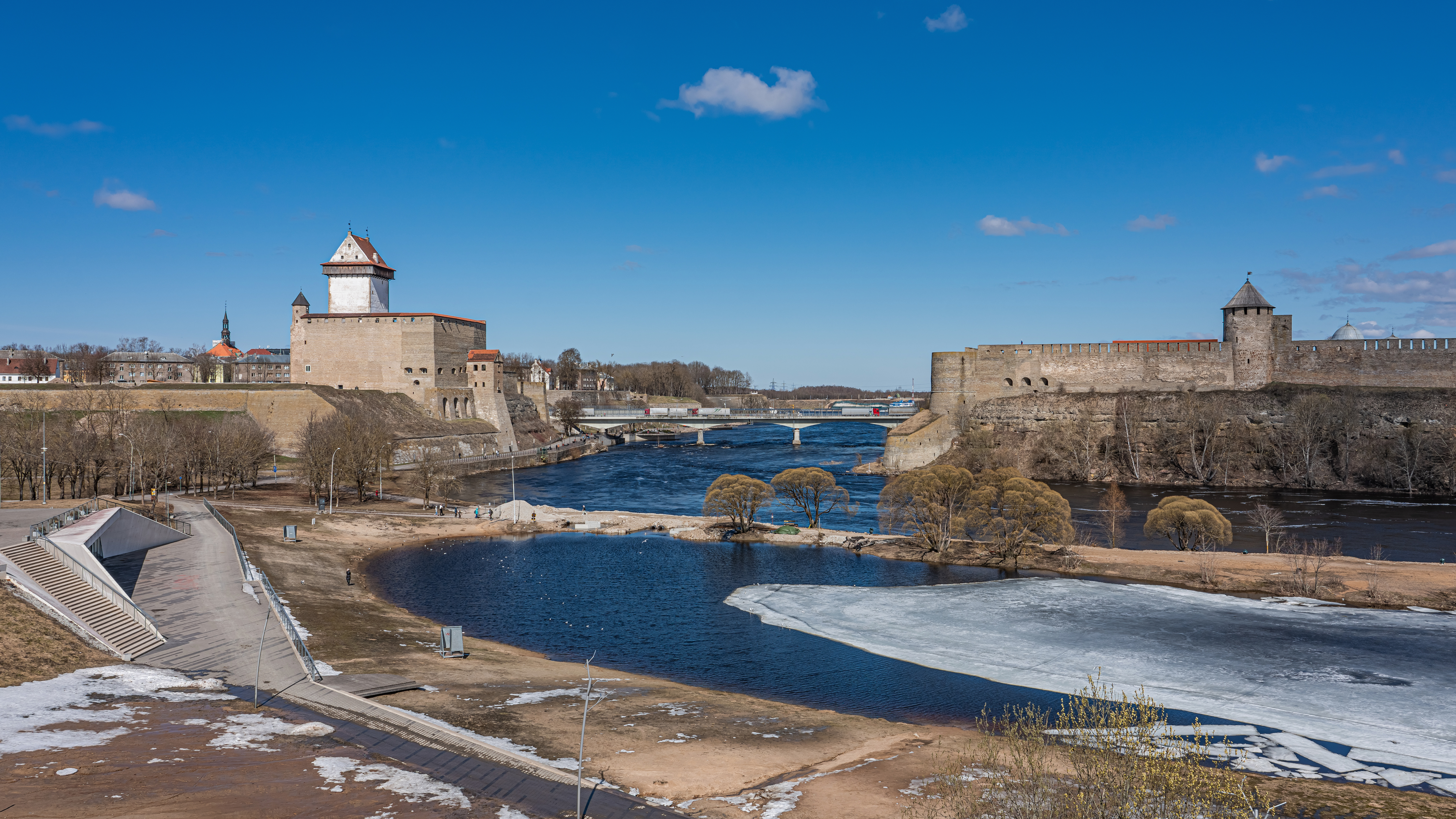
- The reconstructed fortress of Narva (to the left) overlooking the Russian fortress of Ivangorod (to the right)

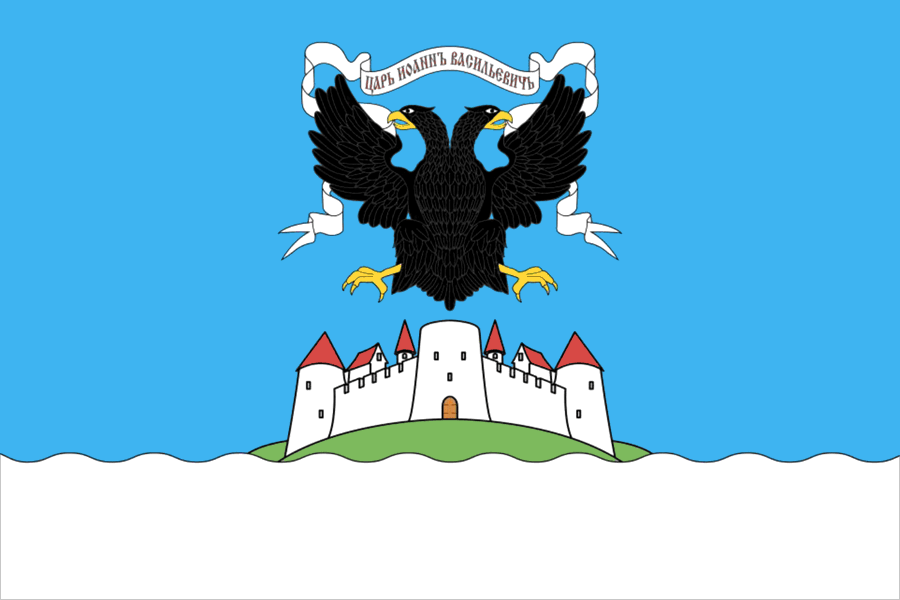
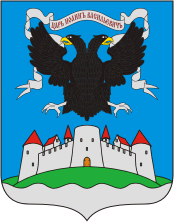
- Flag Coat of arms
- Interactive map of Ivangorod
- Location of Ivangorod Ivangorod (Leningrad Oblast)
- Coordinates: 59°22′N 28°13′E
- Country: Russia
- Federal subject: Leningrad Oblast
- Administrative district: Kingiseppsky District
- Settlement municipal formationSelsoviet: Ivangorodskoye Settlement Municipal Formation
- Founded: 1492
- Town status since: 28 October 1954
- Elevation: 32 m (105 ft)

Population (2010 Census)
  - Total: 9,854
  - Estimate (2024): 9,552 (−3.1%)

Administrative status
  - Capital of: Ivangorodskoye Settlement Municipal Formation

Municipal status
  - Municipal district: Kingiseppsky Municipal District
  - Urban settlement: Ivangorodskoye Urban Settlement
  - Capital of: Ivangorodskoye Urban Settlement
- Time zone: UTC+3 (MSK)
- Postal codes: 188490, 188491
- Dialing code: +7 81375
- OKTMO ID: 41621102001
- Website: www.ivangorod.ru

Ivangorod (Russian: Иванго́род, IPA: [ɪvɐnˈɡorət]; Estonian: Jaanilinn; Votic: Jaanilidna) is a town in Kingiseppsky District of Leningrad Oblast, Russia, located on the east bank of the Narva river which flows along the Estonia–Russia international border, 159 kilometers (99 mi) west of Saint Petersburg, 218 kilometers (135 mi) east of Tallinn, Estonia. The town's population was recorded as 9,854 (2010 census); 11,206 (2002 census); 11,833 (1989 Soviet census). As of 2025, the population of Ivangorod was estimated to be 9,878.

Ivangorod is a major border crossing point and a railway station on the Tallinn–Saint Petersburg line. It is located just opposite to the Estonian town of Narva. The town is the site of the Ivangorod Fortress, a prominent fortification monument of the 15th and the 16th centuries.

== History ==
=== Period of the Russian Tsardom ===
In 1470, the chronicles first mentioned the "New Village on the Narova River", the future Ivangorod.

In 1473, the First Pskov Chronicle mentioned Pskov posadniks and boyars who were sent to the "New village on the Narova", opposite the city of Rugodiv (Narva), to meet the Livonians along with Novgorod envoys. According to historian Vladimir Kostochkin: "On the basis of this village Ivangorod then grew."

The fortress, established in 1492 during the reign of Ivan III, the grand prince of Moscow, took its name (literally: Ivan-town – gorod in Russian means "town" or "city") from that of the tsar. The fortress was built along with a series of other fortifications on the border with Livonia. Ivan was said to have blinded the fortress's architect to prevent him from building such a structure for anyone else. A battle between Russian and Swedish forces took place at the fortress in 1496.

The location was chosen in advance: already in the 1480s the Grand Prince instructed his envoys to Lithuania to inquire in detail about harbors on the Baltic Sea. At that time the Baltic trade route acquired prime importance for the Russian state, for its economic and cultural development, and also for its political relations with European countries. Only through the Baltic Sea could trade be conducted independently of foreign control and interference. The town was intended to become the first seaport of the Russian state and, at the same time, a fortress on the Baltic.

The original fortress laid down in 1492 was besieged and destroyed by the Swedes in 1496. After this the Russians restored and expanded it. In German documents of the late 15th century it was known as a "counter-Narva". The Ivangorod Fortress with its mighty stone walls and ten towers was the first Russian defensive work with a regular rectangular plan.

In 1565, when Tsar Ivan the Terrible divided the Russian state into the Oprichnina and the Zemshchina, the town became part of the latter.

=== As part of the Swedish Empire ===
Between 1581 and 1590 and from 1612 to 1704, Sweden controlled the area. Ivangorod was granted town privileges and administered as a Russian township under the Swedish Empire (who conquered it in 1612 from boyar Teuvo Aminev) until 1649, when its burghers were ordered to remove to a Narva suburb. In 1617 Russia and Sweden signed the Treaty of Stolbovo, which placed the area under Swedish sovereignty. Russia reconquered it during the Great Northern War in 1704. Despite other changes in territory and sovereignty, Ivangorod was considered an administrative part of the town of Narva from 1649 until 1945. In 1780, Ivangorod, together with Narva, was included into Narvsky Uyezd of Saint Petersburg Governorate. In 1796, Narvsky Uyezd was abolished and merged into Yamburgsky Uyezd.

=== As part of the Russian Empire ===
After the end of the Great Northern War the military significance of Ivangorod Fortress gradually waned. The town lost the status of an independent locality and came to be considered a suburb (forstadt) of Narva. In 1708, Tsar Peter the Great introduced a new administrative division under which the cities of the North-West, including Narva with Ivangorod, were placed in the Ingermanland Governorate, which in 1710 was renamed Saint Petersburg Governorate.

In the 19th and first half of the 20th centuries it was most often mentioned in documents and old-timers' reminiscences as the "Ivanov side" of Narva.

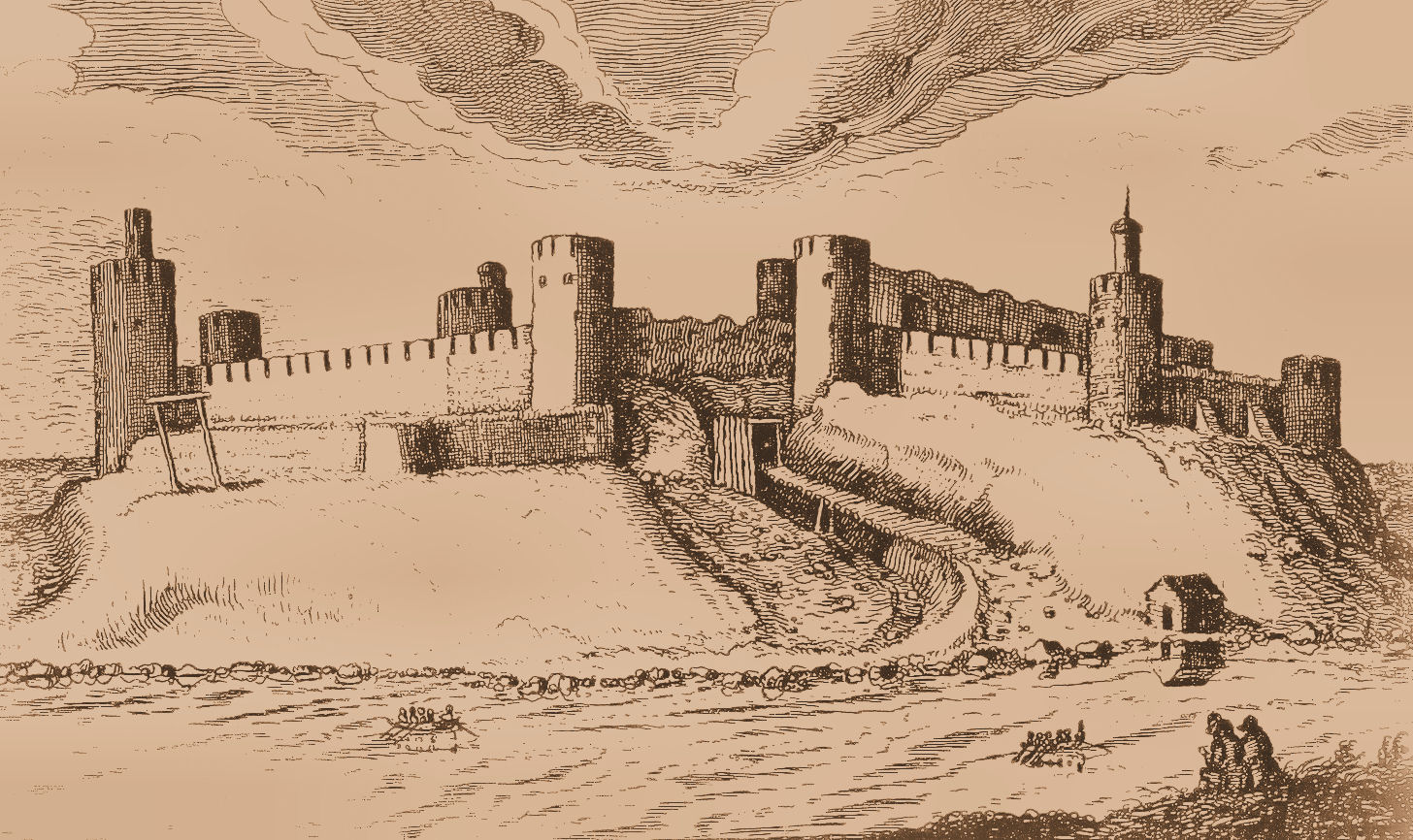
The Ivangorod Fortress in 1616

In July 1917, Narva district, including Ivangorod, voted in referendum to join recently formed Autonomous Governorate of Estonia. The city was captured by the Imperial German Army during World War I after the Russian Army abandoned the local fortress.

=== Estonian period ===
During the Estonian War of Independence (1918–1920), the newly independent Republic of Estonia established control over the whole of Narva, including Ivangorod, in January 1919, a move which Soviet Russia recognized in the 1920 Treaty of Tartu.

According to 1922 data, Ivangorod (at that time a district of Narva) had a population of 7,000, 42% of whom were Estonians.

In 1937, Narva and Ivangorod (as a district of Narva) hosted the first Russian Choral Festival (see also Estonian Song Festival), dedicated to the 100th anniversary of the death of Alexander Pushkin. Performances by choirs, soloists, and orchestras took place at the Narva Public Assembly, the "Harmony" club, the Ivangorod Fire Society, and at the People's House of the Woolen Manufactory. More than 15,000 spectators attended the festival.

=== Soviet period and the present ===
After the incorporation of Estonia into the USSR in 1940, the town remained within the administrative borders of the newly formed Estonian SSR. From 1941 to 1944 it was occupied by Nazi Germany. During the Great Patriotic War, Ivangorod, like the rest of Narva, suffered greatly; however, several pre-war buildings survived in the center and especially in the southern part.

In January 1945 Soviet authorities defined the Narva river as the border between the Estonian SSR and Russian SFSR, and as a result the administration of Ivangorod transferred from Narva to the Kingiseppsky District of Leningrad Oblast. Having grown in population, Ivangorod gained town status on 28 October 1954.

After the restoration of Estonian independence in 1991, there have been some disputes about the Estonian-Russian border in the Narva area, as the new constitution of Estonia (adopted in 1992) recognizes the 1920 Treaty of Tartu border to be currently legal. The Russian Federation, however, regards Estonia as a successor of the Estonian SSR and recognizes the 1945 border between two former national republics. Officially, Estonia has no territorial claims in the area, which is also reflected in the new Estonian-Russian border treaty, according to which Ivangorod remains a part of Russia. Although the Estonian Foreign Minister Urmas Paet and Russian Foreign Minister Sergey Lavrov signed the treaty in 2005, due to continuing political tensions it has not been ratified.

2014 when Russo-Ukrainian war began, subsequent events related to the devaluing of Russian ruble created problems for locals. When €1 value hit 87 rubles, favorable exchange rate brought many Estonian residents from Narva to shop in Ivangorod, leading to the price increase for many products like meat at the local market. Town was filled with cars with Estonian license plates and queues could be seen at businesses selling clothes, domestic electronics and items made from gold. Not all Estonian residents were not satisfied with change as the exchange rate fluctuation created problems for the ones working in Ivangorod, hitting ones income who got paid in rubles. Working on the Russian side is a workaround for some Estonian residents, who don't speak Estonian, as in Estonia Estonian language knowledge is mandatory for many jobs and career advancement, especially for jobs with public sector. This is particularly tempting if person does not meet naturalization requirements for Estonian passport or just does not wish to apply for one, settling with Estonian alien's passport, document that provides its user visa free access to Russia since 1991.

== Administrative and municipal status ==
Within the framework of administrative divisions, it is, together with two rural localities, incorporated within Kingiseppsky District as Ivangorodskoye Settlement Municipal Formation. As a municipal division, Ivangorodskoye Settlement Municipal Formation is incorporated within Kingiseppsky Municipal District as Ivangorodskoye Urban Settlement. Aside from Ivangorod itself, the municipality also includes the settlements of Orekhovaya Gorka and Popovka.

== Restricted access ==
The town of Ivangorod is included into the border security zone, intended to protect the borders of Russia from unwanted activity. In order to visit the zone, a permit issued by the local Federal Security Service department or a valid Schengen visa is required. An EU passport with a Russian visa is also valid (2016).

== Economy ==
=== Industry ===
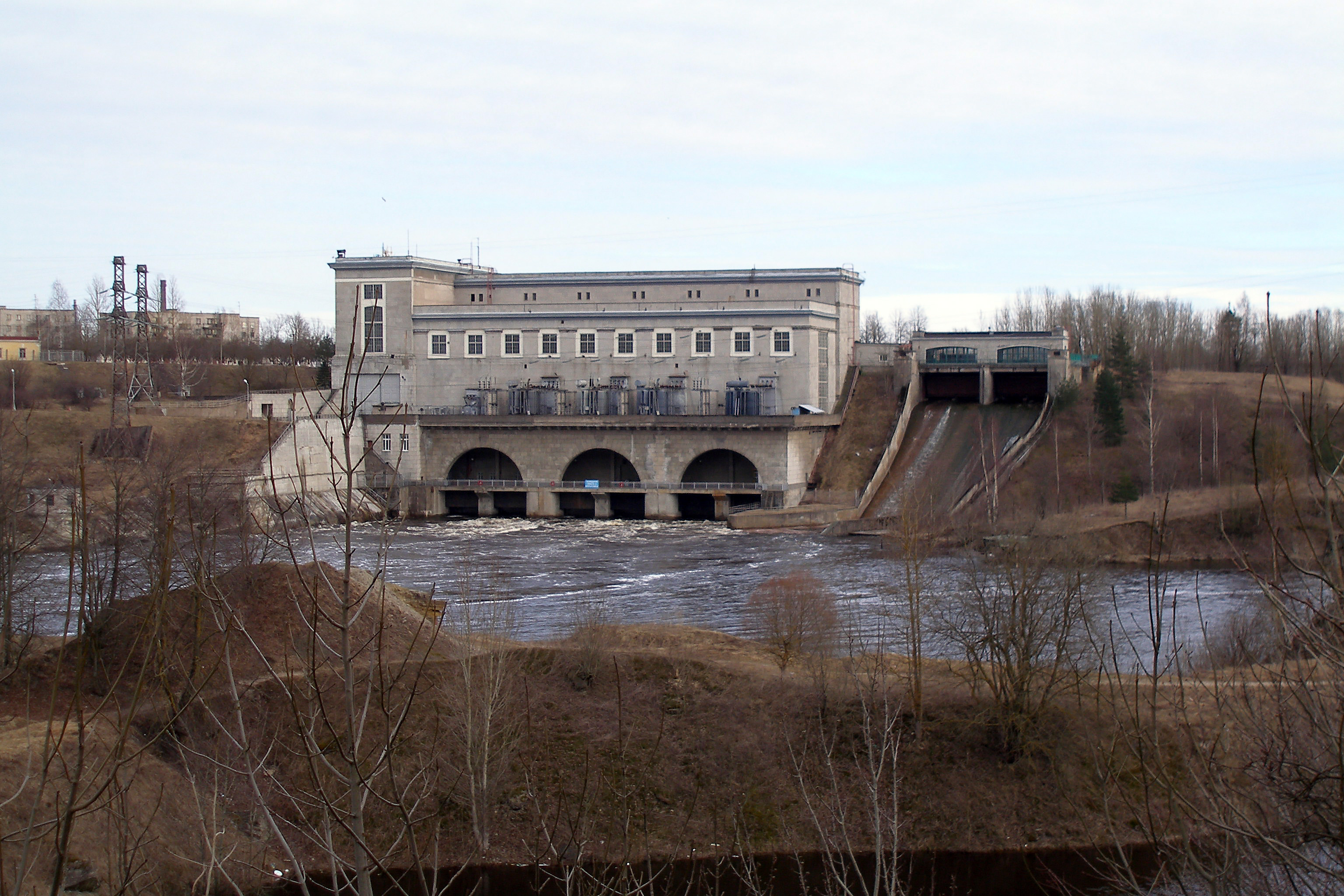
Narva Hydroelectric Station

Ivangorod has enterprises of textile, food, and timber industries, as well as a plant producing metallic plants and reservoirs. The Narva Hydroelectric Station is located in the town limits as well.

=== Transportation ===
The railway connecting Saint Petersburg with Tallinn passes through Ivangorod. There is infrequent suburban service to Baltiysky railway station of Saint Petersburg, as well as passenger service to Tallinn.

The A180 Highway connects Saint Petersburg and Ivangorod. It coincides with the European route E20 connecting Saint Petersburg via Tallinn with Shannon Airport.

== Culture ==
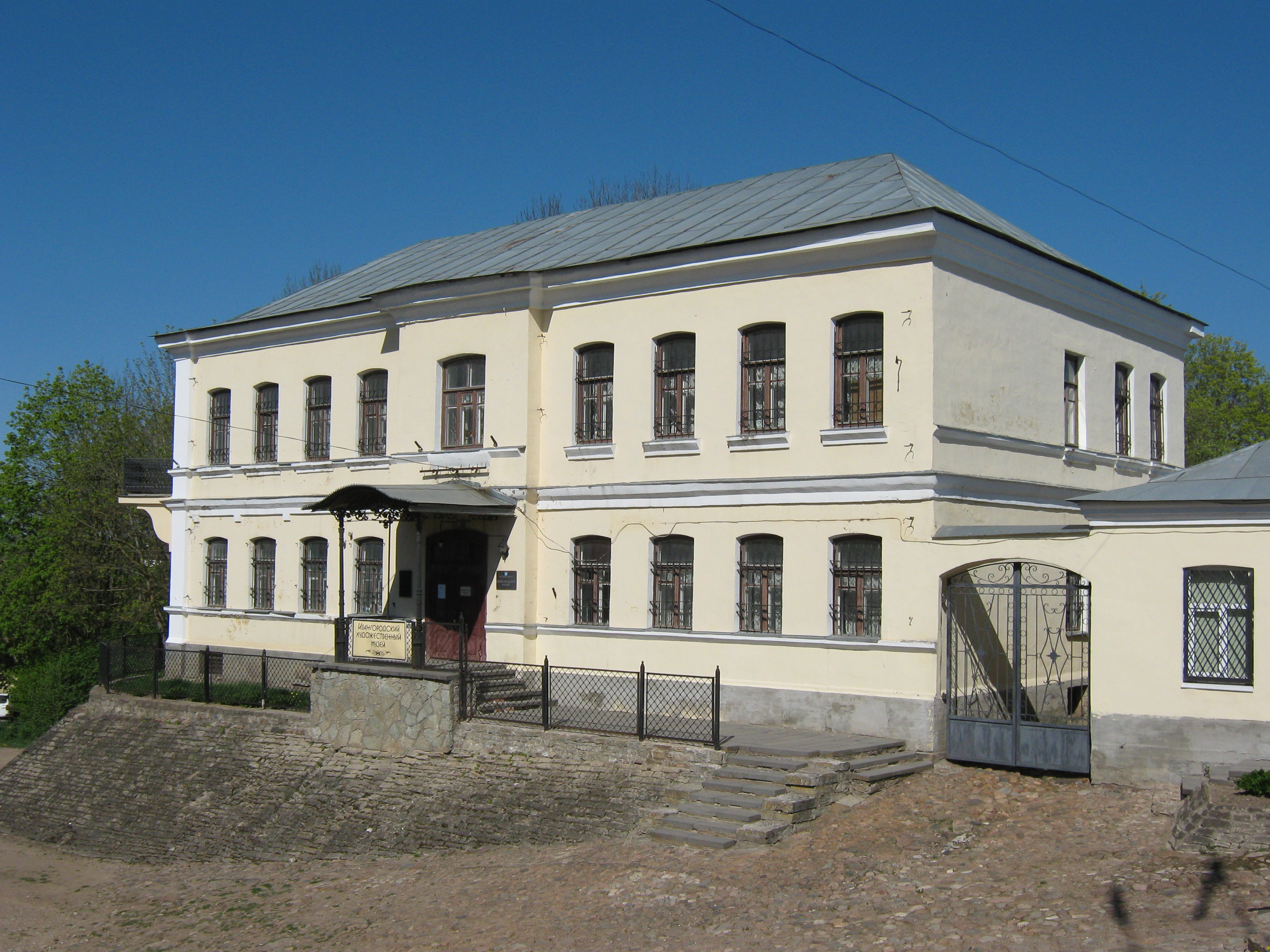
Art museum

Ivangorod contains thirty-three cultural heritage monuments of federal significance and additionally seven objects classified as cultural and historical heritage of local significance. All federal monuments are related to the Ivangorod Fortress. The fortress functions as a museum.

== Border with Estonia ==
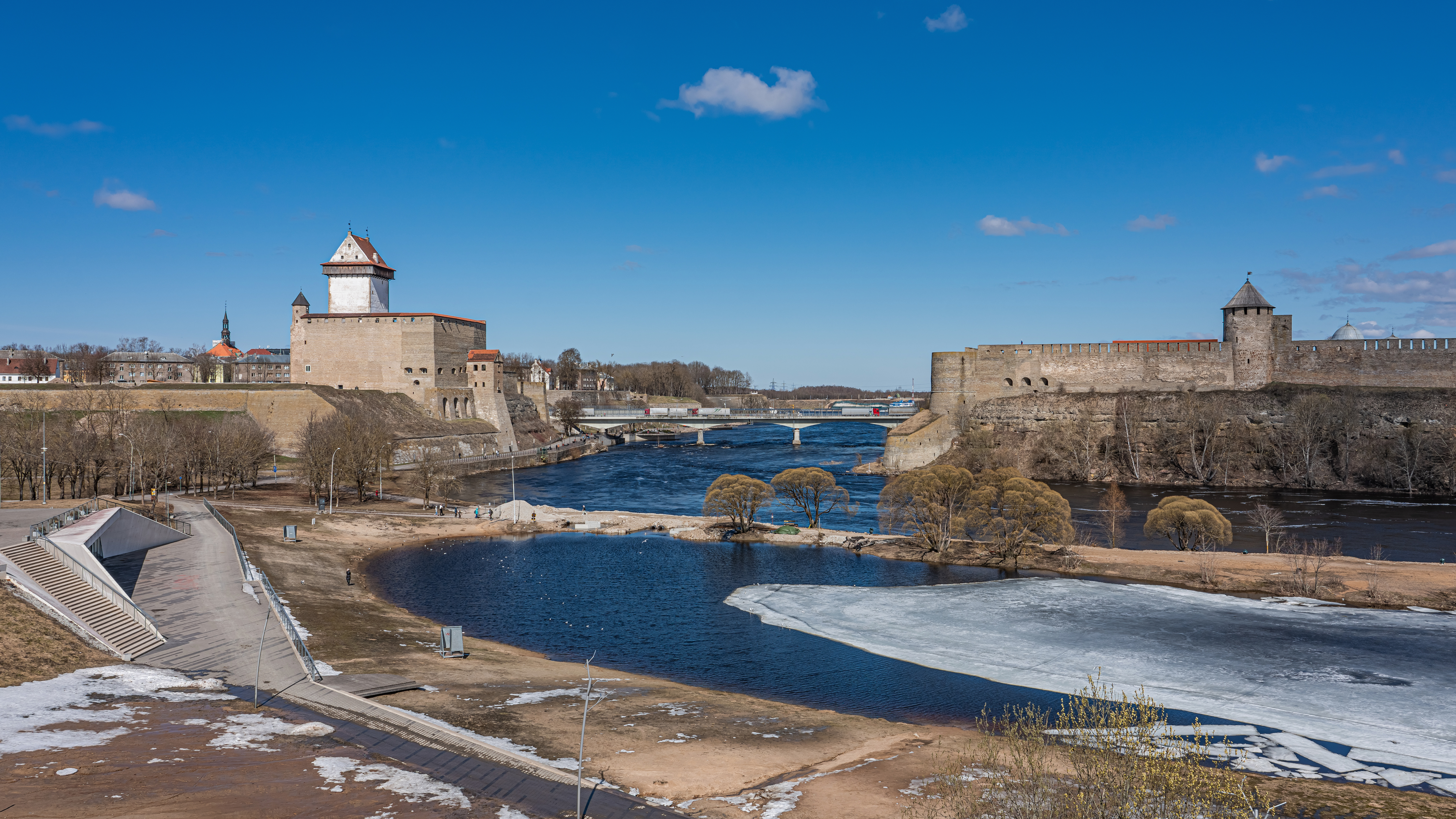
The Narva River, along which the border runs between Estonia (left) and Russia (right) at Narva and Ivangorod.

Ivangorod is in the border zone.

The state border between Russia and Estonia runs along the Narva River.

There are three border crossing points in Ivangorod:

- MAPP (multilateral automobile crossing point) Ivangorod. Operating since early 1993. Open 24 hours. The border can be crossed by car, bicycle, and on foot. Cyclists and pedestrians cross via the pedestrian checkpoint. At the automobile crossing, a Duty-free shop is open beyond the customs control line – at the pedestrian checkpoint the shop has been closed. Crossing is by the road-pedestrian Friendship Bridge, built in 1960 and overhauled in recent years. Queues arise on both the Russian and Estonian sides because it is the only automobile bridge across the Narva.
- PPP (pedestrian crossing point) "Parusinka". Located on a footbridge over the old semi-dry riverbed of the Narva. Crossing is allowed only for holders of Russian and Estonian passports, including Estonian non-citizens – provided they carry no goods requiring written customs declaration. In 2017 the checkpoint was reconstructed and its capacity increased fivefold.
- Railway crossing point at Ivangorod-Narvsky station.

== Twin towns and sister cities ==
Ivangorod is twinned with:

- Karlskoga Municipality, Sweden (until 2022)
- Narva, Estonia
- Kamienna Góra, Poland (until 2022)

== Gallery ==
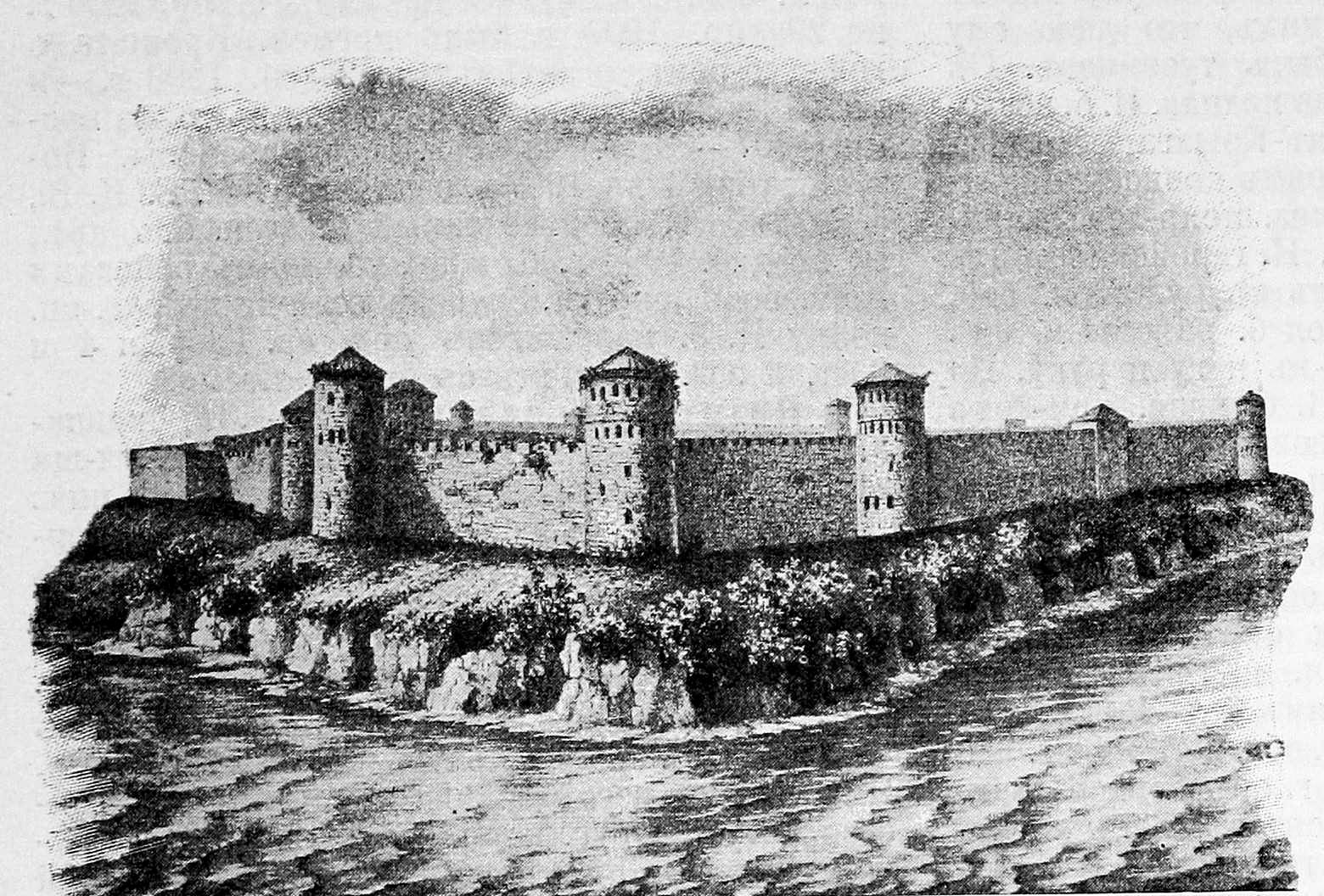
View of the fortress (illustration from the article "Ivan-Gorod", Sytin's Military Encyclopedia)

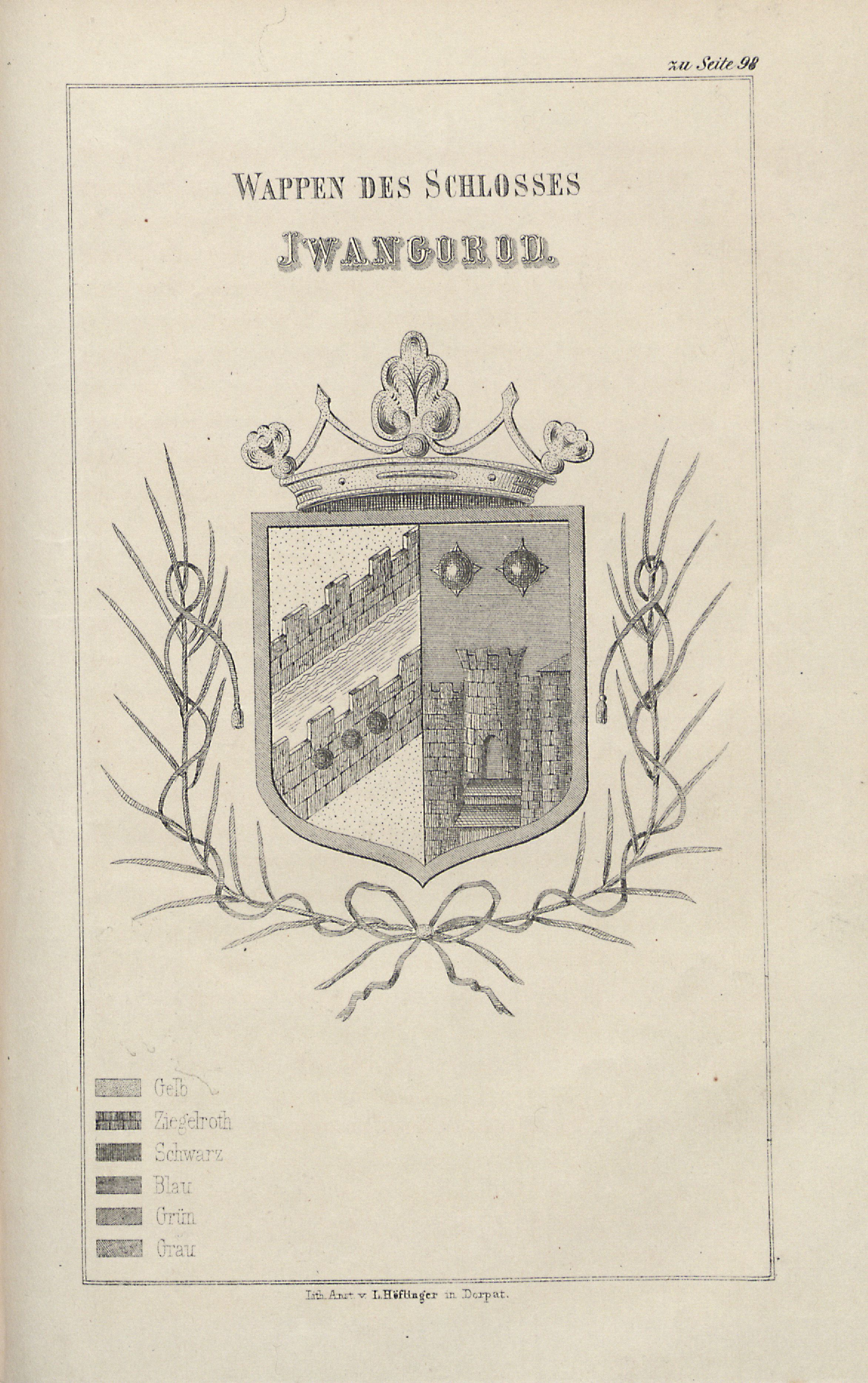
Ivangorod coat of arms (17th century) from the book History of the city of Narva

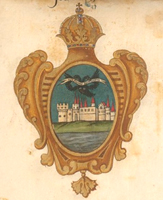
Coat of arms of the Ivangorod regiment, 1730.

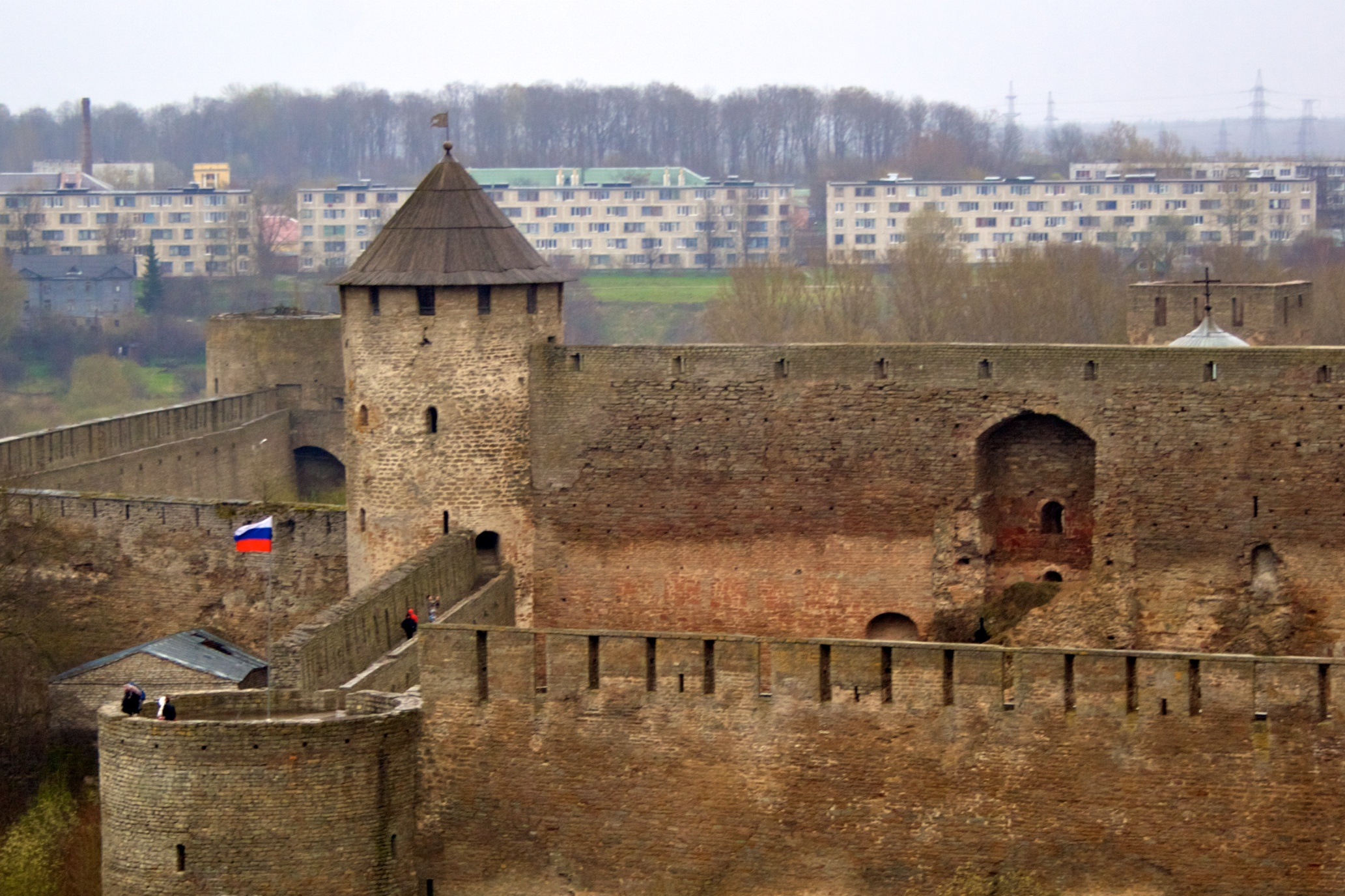
Ivangorod Fortress and a residential area of the town

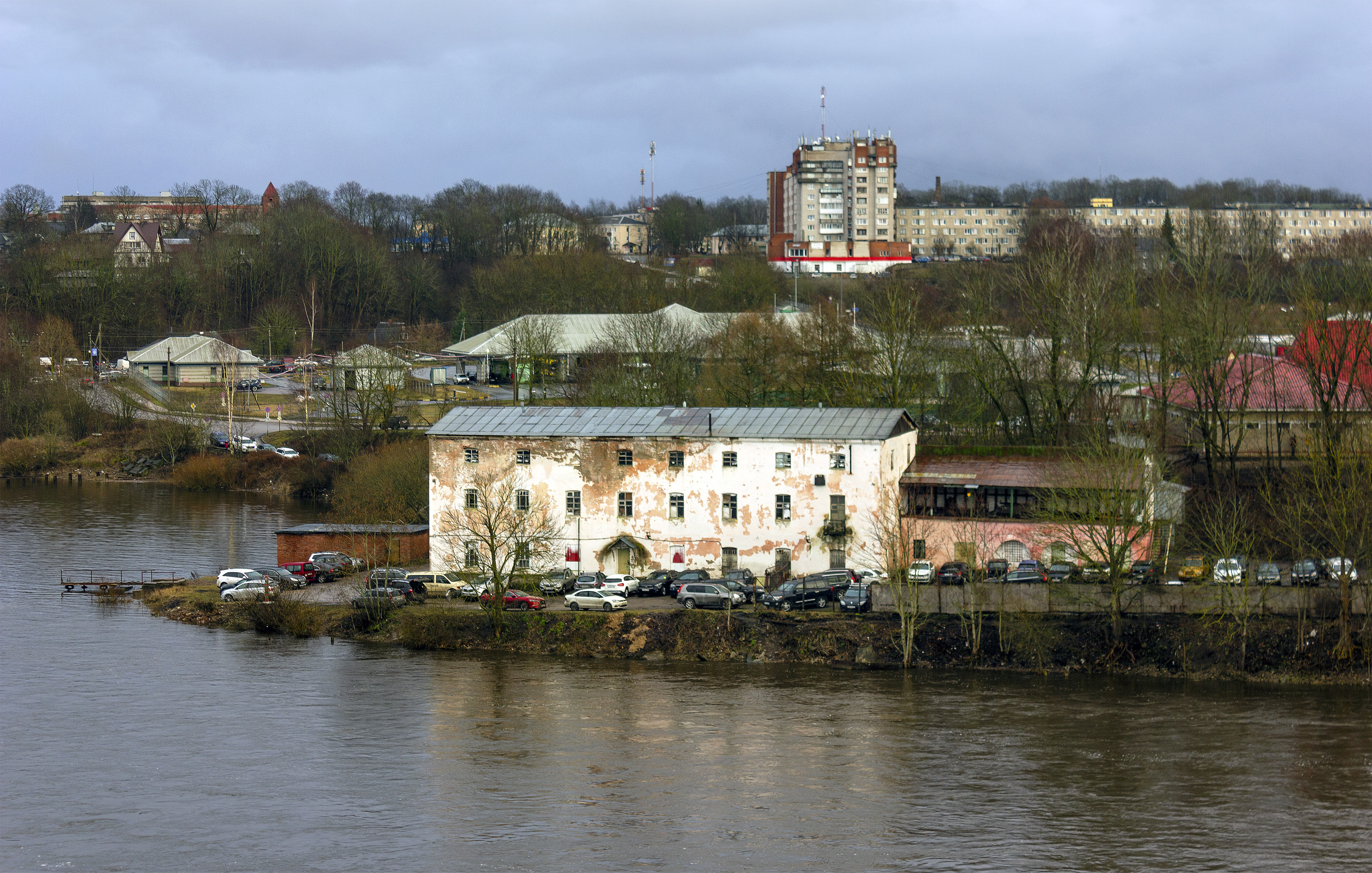
View of Ivangorod (Russia) from the city of Narva (Estonia)

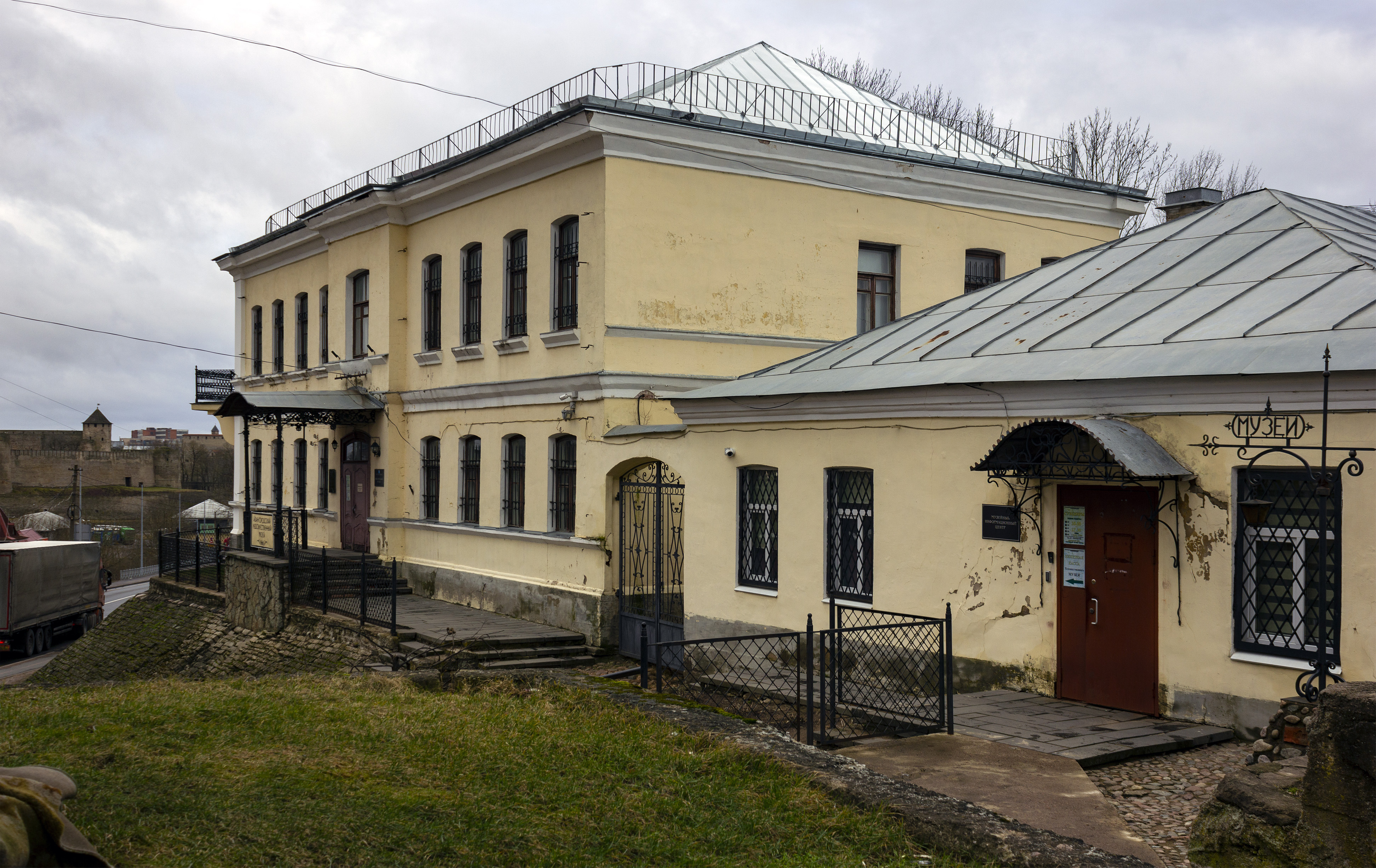
Municipal art museum

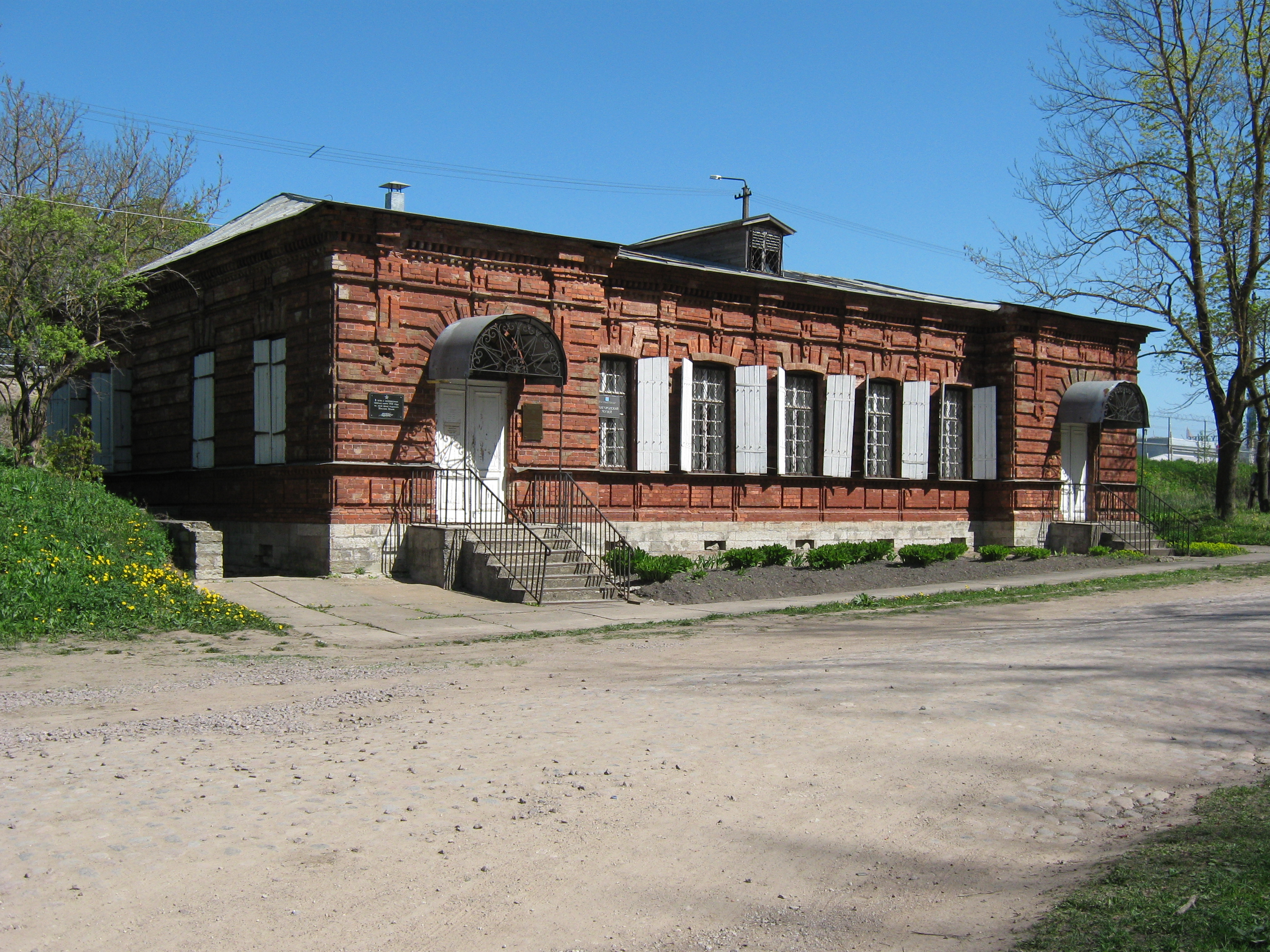
Museum of Military-Defensive Architecture of North-Western Rus'

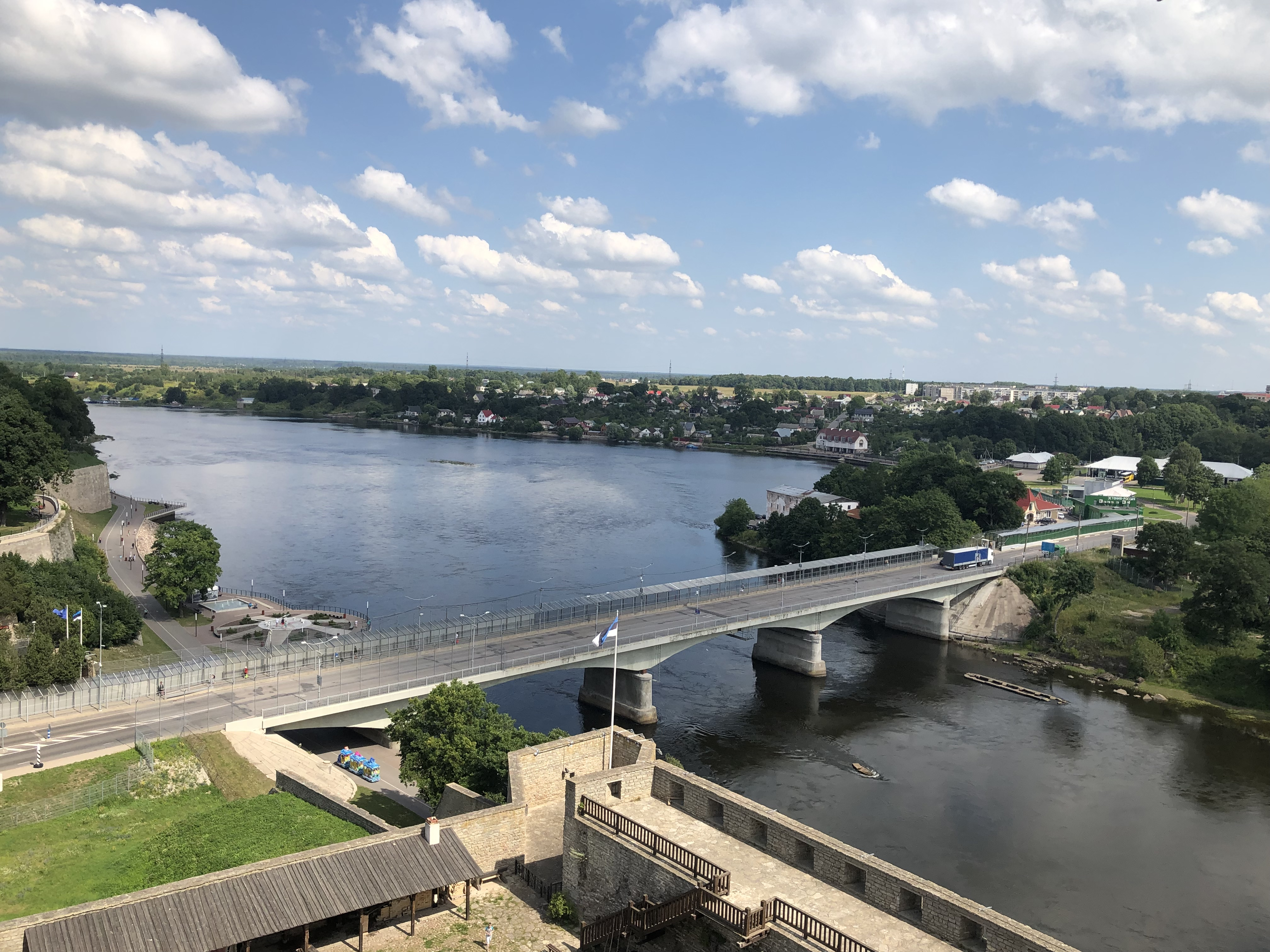
View of the Friendship Bridge, the Narva promenade, and Ivangorod (from the tower of Hermann Castle, Narva)

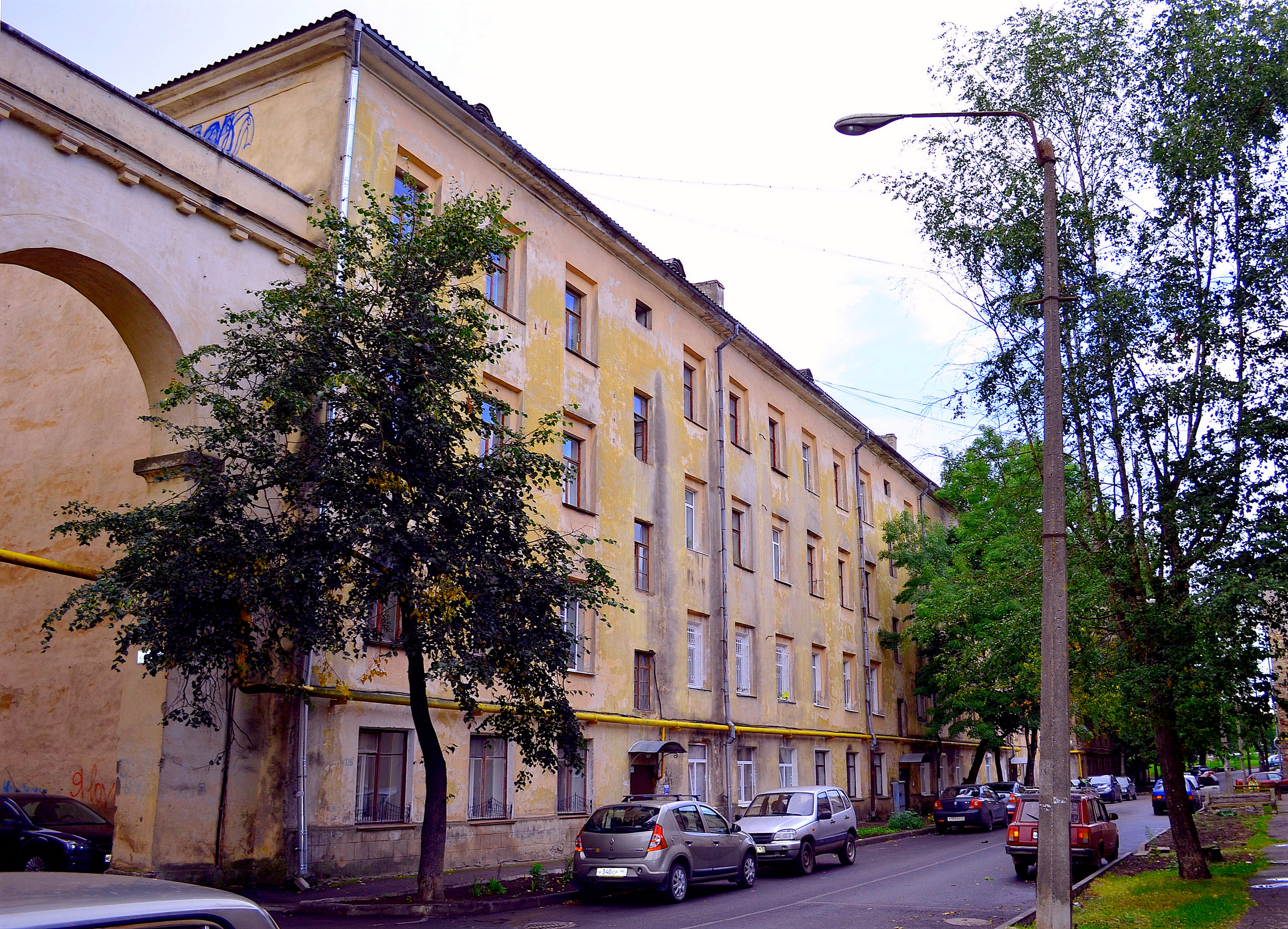
Ivangorod, the Parusinka district
