= Resurrection of Christ Cathedral, Narva =

Church building in Narva, Estonia

Resurrection Cathedral
- Resurrection of Christ Cathedral
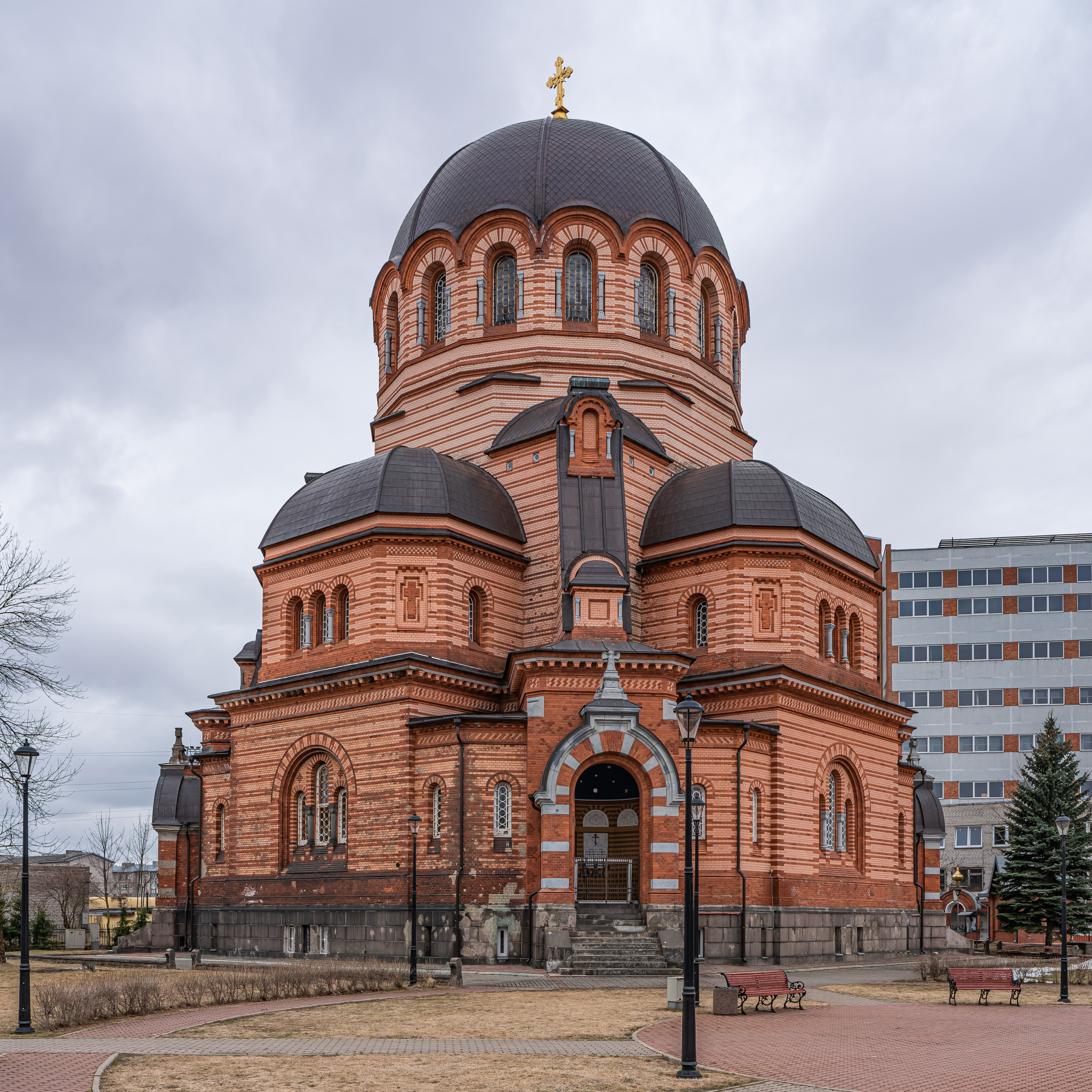
- Resurrection Cathedral
- 59°22′16″N 28°11′36″E
- Location: Narva
- Country: Estonia
- Denomination: Eastern Orthodox
- Churchmanship: Estonian Orthodox Church of Moscow Patriarchate
- Website: narvasobor.ee

History
- Status: Cathedral
- Founded: 1890
- Consecrated: 17 November 1896

Architecture
- Functional status: Active
- Architect: Paul Alisch
- Architectural type: Church
- Style: Byzantine Revival
- Years built: 1890-1896

Specifications
- Capacity: 2,000 worshipers

The Resurrection of Christ Cathedral (Estonian: Narva Issanda Ülestõusmise peakirik, Russian: Нарвский Воскресенский собор) is a Neo-Byzantine style Estonian Orthodox Church of Moscow Patriarchate located in Joaoru district, Narva, Estonia. The church was constructed between 1890 and 1896 to cater to the religious needs of the cotton mill workers of the Krenholm Manufacturing Company.

== History ==
In 1890, the shareholders of the Krenholm Manufacturing Company, under the initiative of director Ivan Prove, decided to construct an Orthodox church for the workers of the company. The shareholders of the company donated 500,000 roubles to construct the church on land donated by Prove. The foundation stone was laid by Bishop Alexander Dmitrievich (Arseny) Bryantsev in the presence of Czar Alexander III and Empress Maria Feodorovna on August 5, 1890. An official meeting between the German Emperor Wilhelm II and Czar Alexander III happened at the same time in Narva.

It survived World War II with minor damages. It was the only active Orthodox church in Narva post-war. On 20 January 1958, it was renamed as the Cathedral of the Resurrection of Jesus Christ. The cathedral underwent extensive renovations as part of its centenary celebrations. The renovated basement church was consecrated in the name of Seraphim of Sarov by Archbishop Cornelius of Tallinn and all of Estonia on November 16, 1996.

In 2011 and 2017–2018, the facade of the church was restored, with 1500m² or about 65% of the facade restored in total.

== Architecture ==
It was built in the Neo-Byzantine style by the architect Paul Alisch(et). It is the only Neo-Byzantine style church in Estonia. The church was built with a Greek Cross shaped floor plan. The width of the main dome is 21.5m. The walls are banded with red bricks and yellow bricks, the bricks were made at the Kulgu factory. The stairways, plinth lining and window columns were made of finished granite. The cathedral can hold up to 2000 people during mass and has a bell tower which is 28.8 m high. It also has a three part carved iconostasis made by Afanasjev, the icons were made in Moscow by icon-painter Michail Dikarev, and a crucifix originally made in about the 1660s for the Church of Saint John of Jerusalem (later called Narva cathedral of the Transfiguration of the Lord(et), destroyed 1944) by Elert Thiele. The pendentives and the semi-dome space above the main altar were subsequently painted in 1912.

== Gallery ==
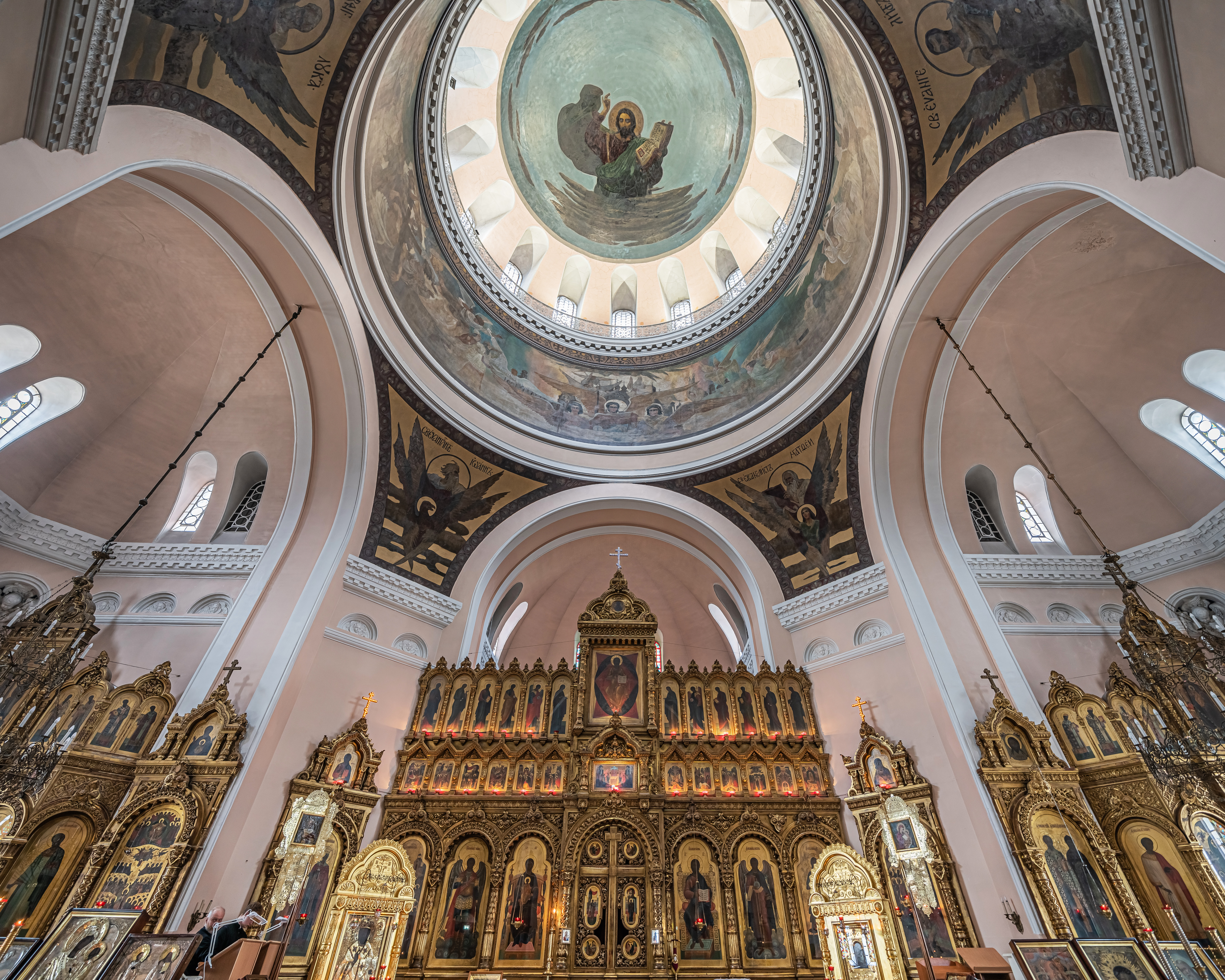
Interior

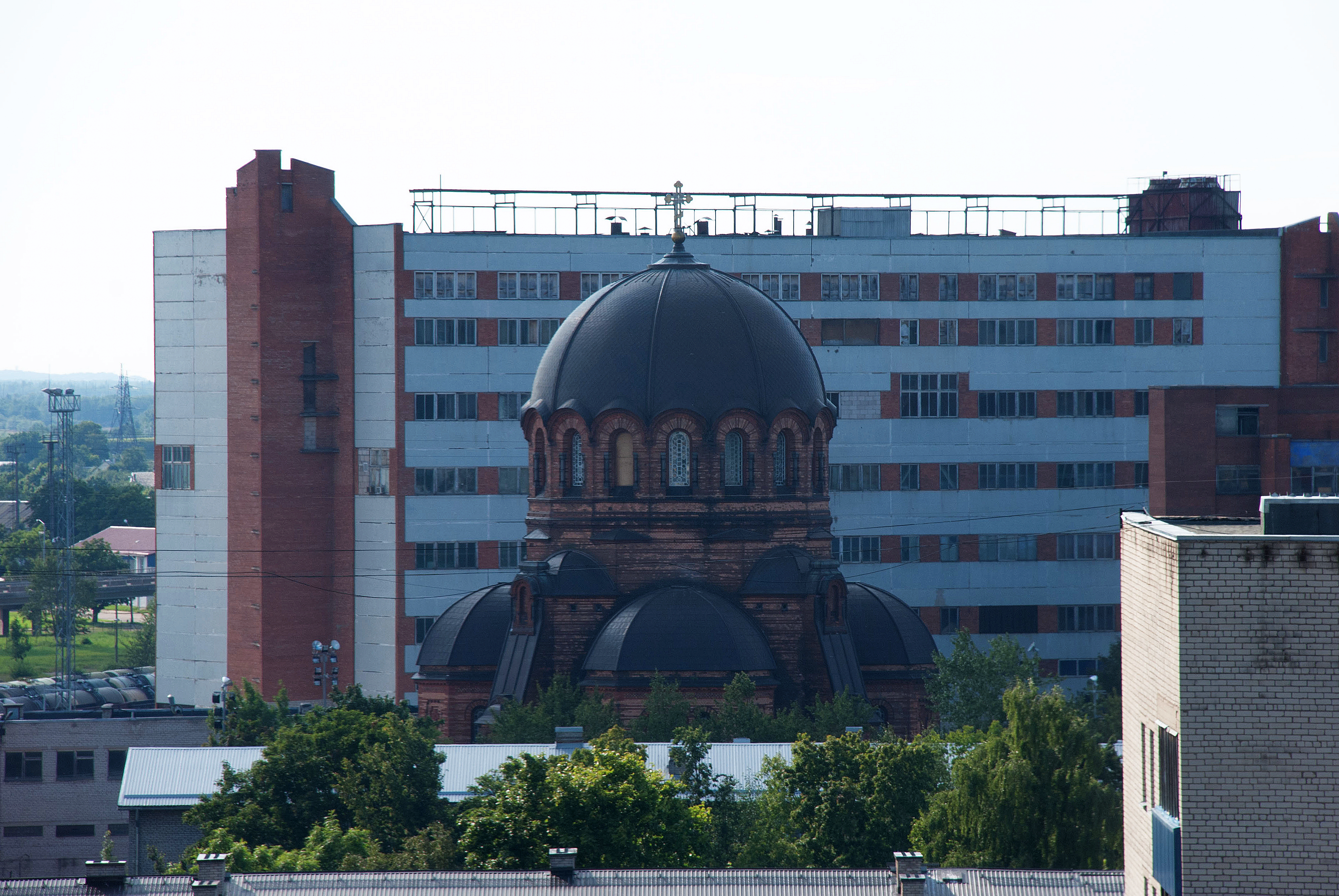
The dome

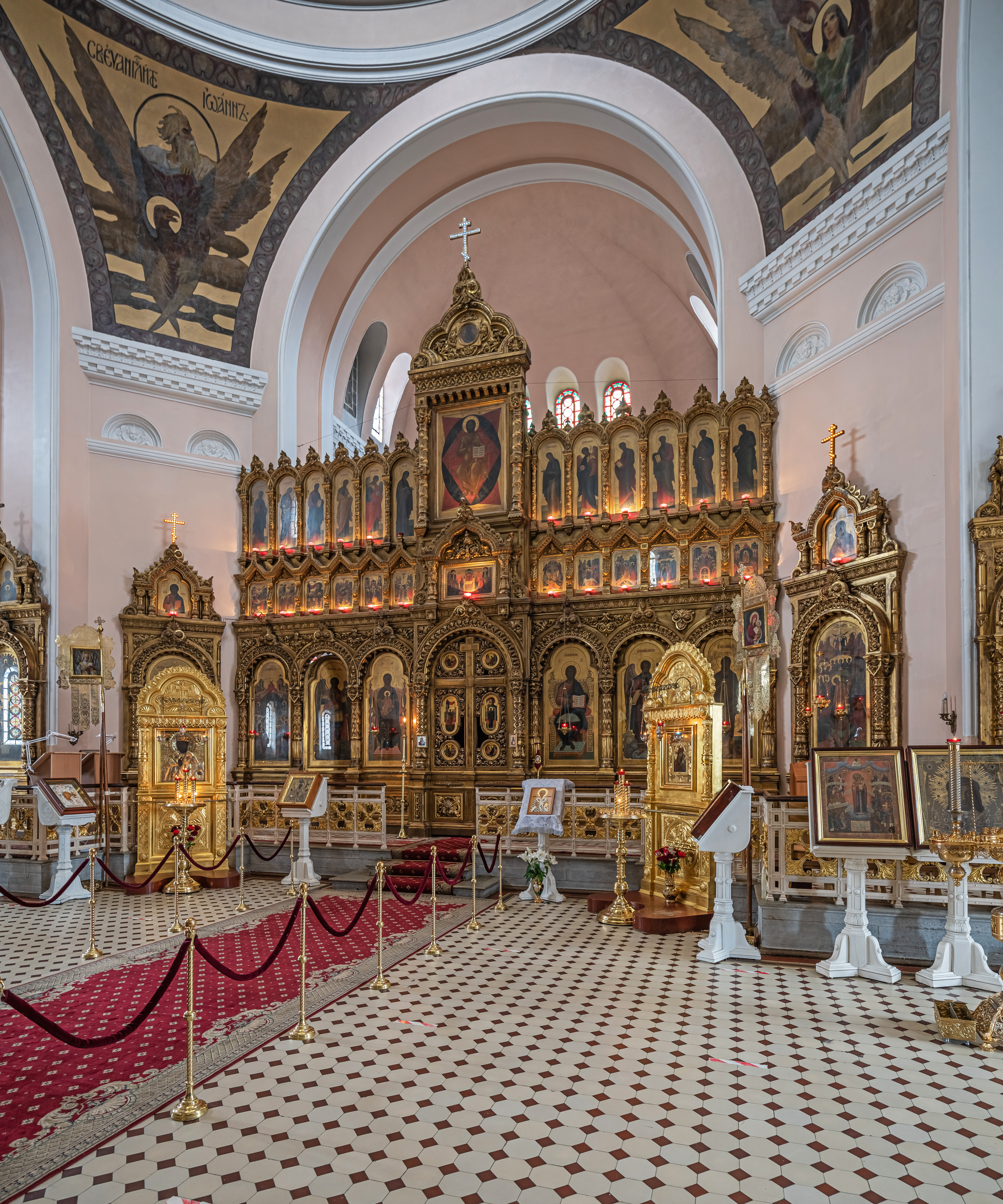
The Iconostasis

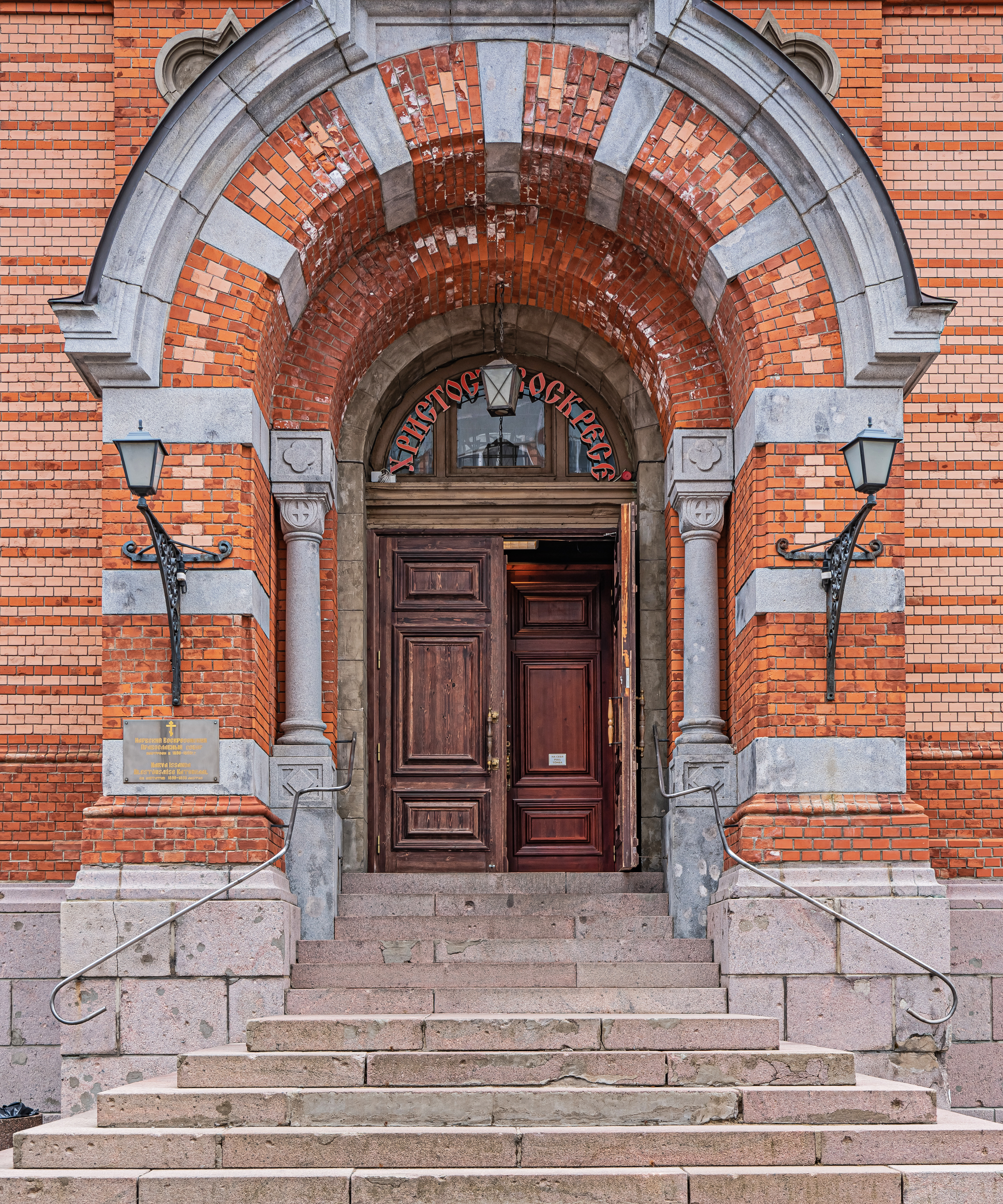
The cathedral's entrance

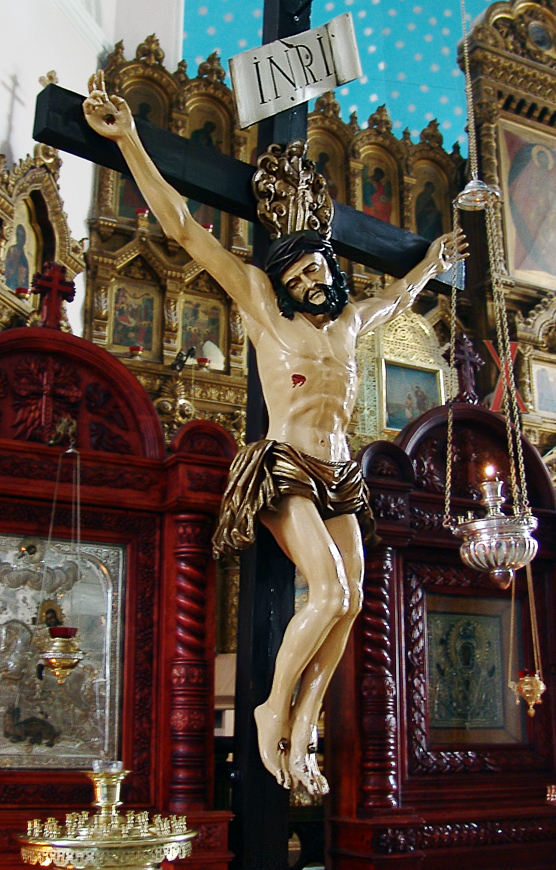
Crucifix made in about the 1660s by Elert Thiele.

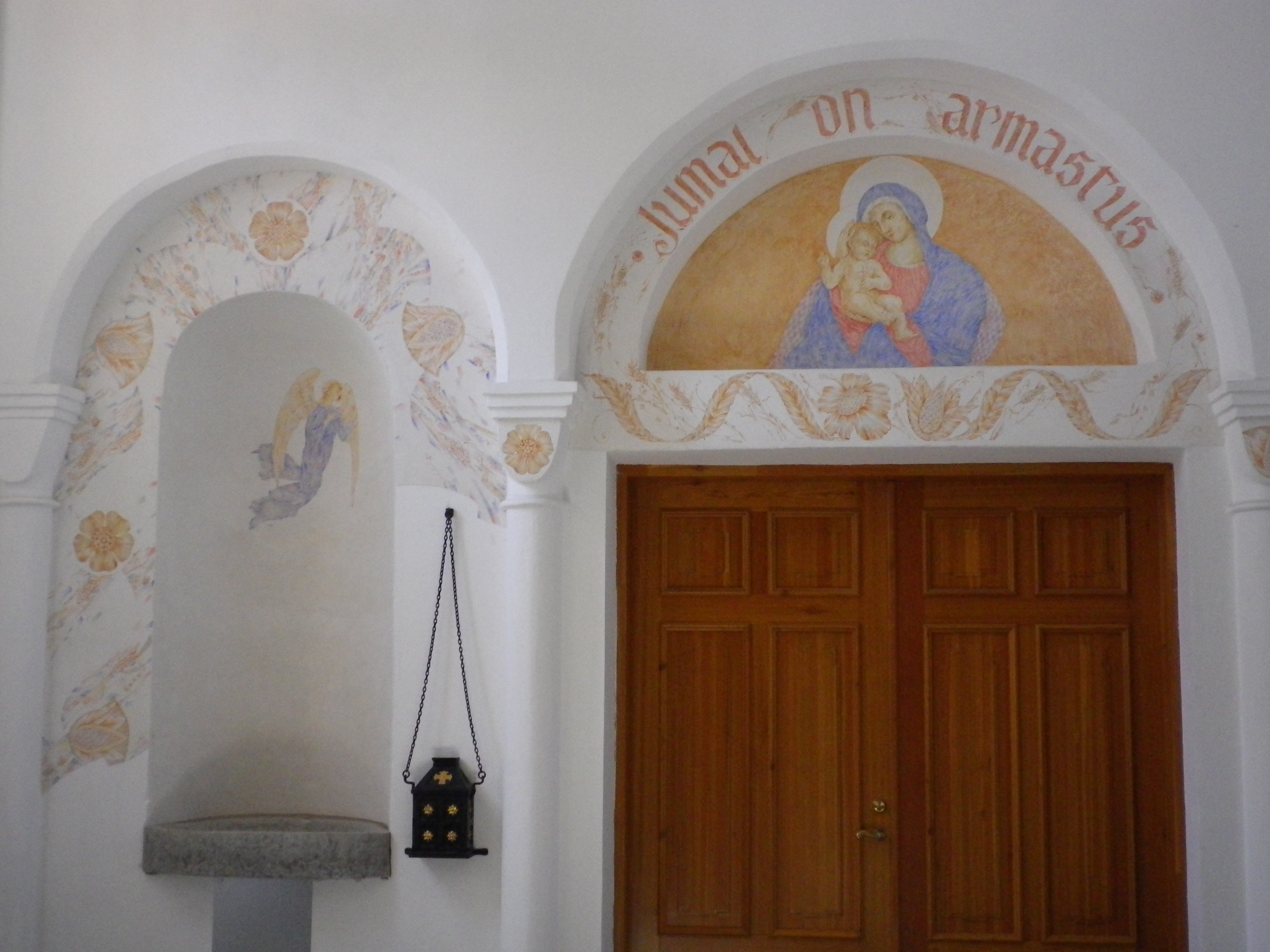
Interior view.

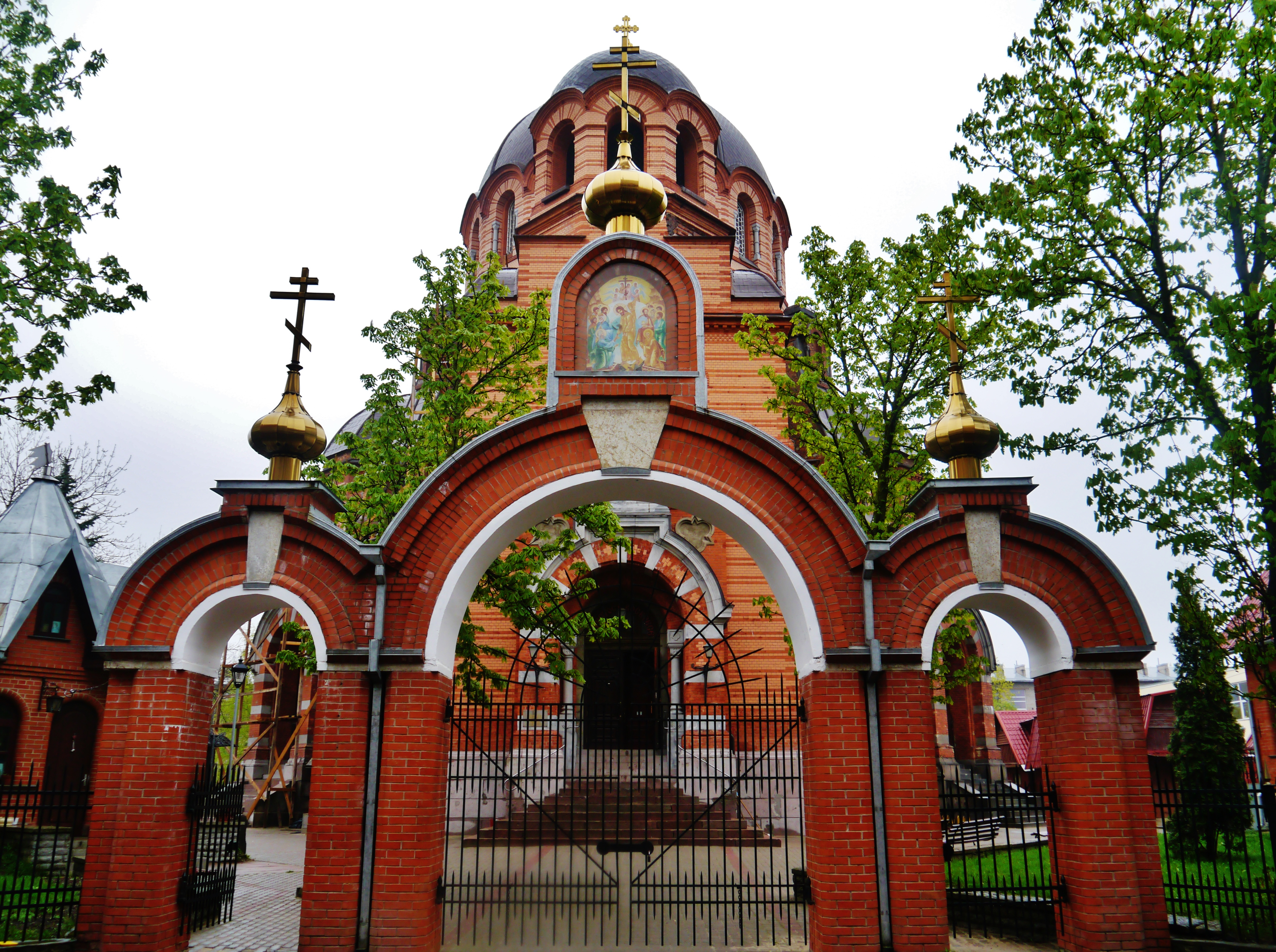
Church gate

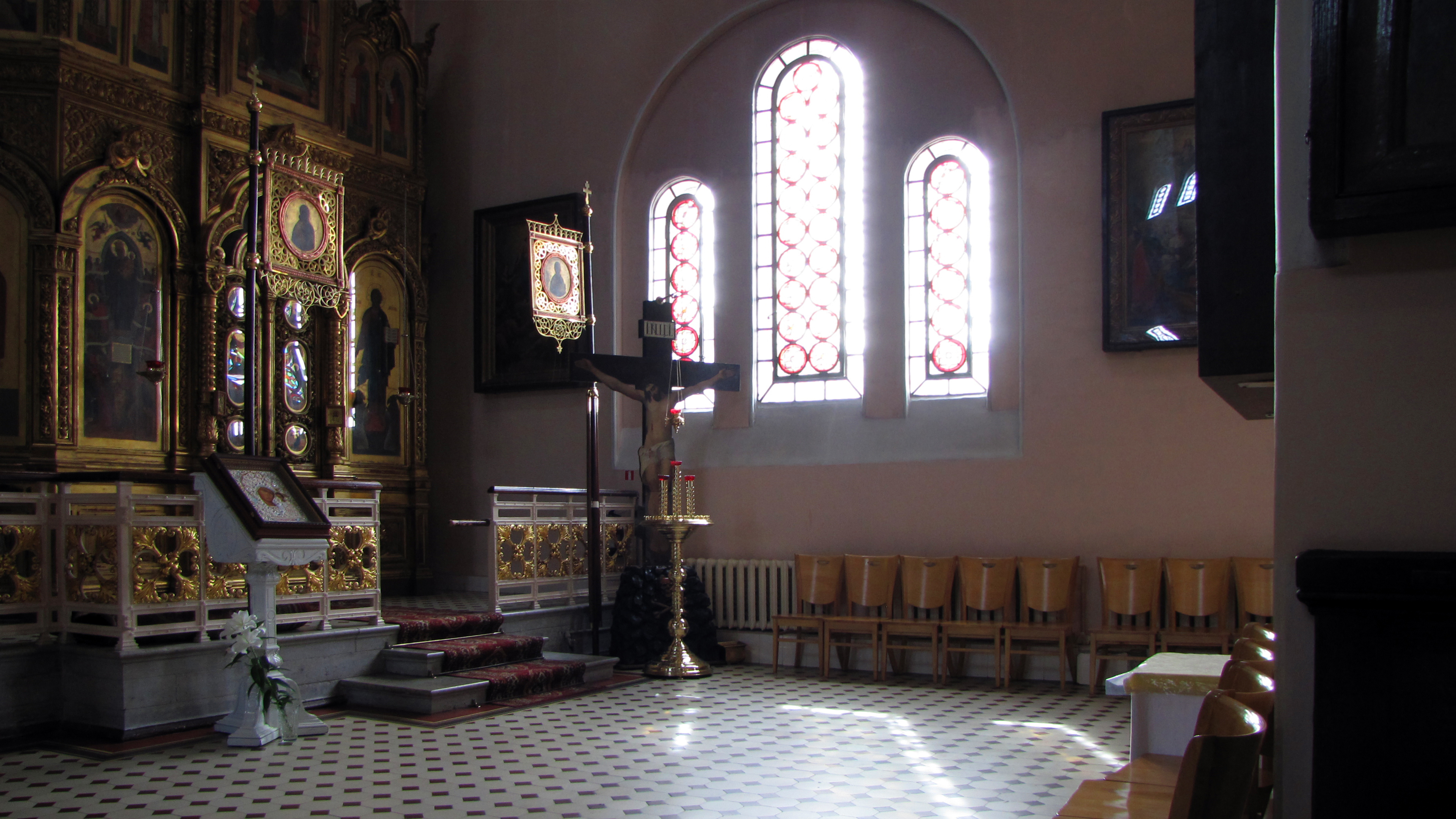
Stained glass window

== See also ==
- List of cathedrals in Estonia
