= Narva scenario =

Hypothetical military scenario

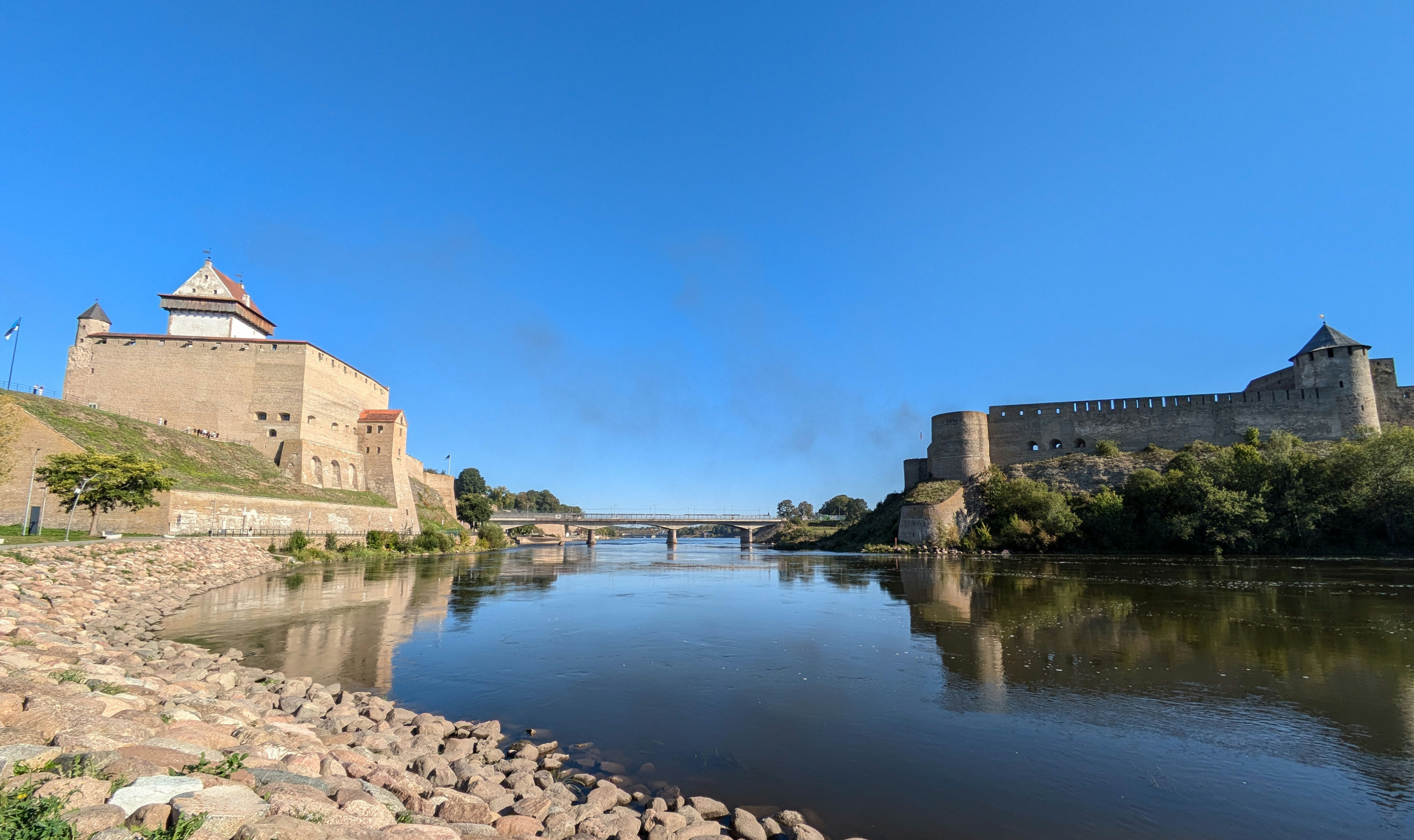
Narva Castle in Estonia (left) and Ivangorod Fortress in Russia (right)

The Narva scenario describes a hypothetical military scenario in which Russia would attack a NATO country using hybrid warfare tactics similar to the initial phase of the actual 2014 Russian invasion of Ukraine, a NATO non-member. Narva is frequently posed as a potential target in such scenario.

== History ==
Following the Russian annexation of Crimea in early 2014, various political commentators such as journalists,, analysts, political scientists as well as economic and military academia have referred to a potential Russian invasion of Estonia mirroring that of Ukraine – using hybrid warfare tactics – as the 'Narva scenario'.

In this hypothetical scenario, the Russian Federation would stage either a direct invasion into or fund paramilitary operations within the territory of the Republic of Estonia, starting from its eastern border. Any operation like this would give Estonia the right to invoke Article 5 of the North Atlantic Treaty, forcing all member states of NATO to take any action they deem necessary to "restore and maintain security".

Such a move from Russia could be intended as a means to test NATO's willingness to risk a direct confrontation with Russia over strategically insignificant territories. A move like this would effectively continue to ask the question of "ready to trade New York for Paris" – a point of criticism first directed against NATO by French president Charles de Gaulle in the 1960s – by asking: "Would the US really risk New York for Narva?". In this case, the 'Narva scenario' would imply a dilemma for the other signatories: Not intervene militarily, effectively letting Russia annex Narva and other parts of Estonia in an attempt at appeasement, or respond in kind by taking military action, risking escalation into global nuclear warfare.

It could also be intended not as a test, but instead be part of a full-scale Russian invasion to conduct another occupation of the Baltic states. In this case, the 'Narva scenario' would describe Russia using the city's significant Russian population as a pretext for invasion, likely as one of many points of entry in a multi-pronged pincer-movement to capture all three Baltic states, with another likely being the Suwałki Gap. In various models of this scenario, Russian forces would reach the outskirts of Tallinn and Riga in a maximum of 60 hours, quickly limiting NATO military capabilities in the Baltic Sea.

== Assessment ==
Many commentators have judged the likelihood of the 'Narva scenario' becoming reality based on the perceived similarities between pre-invasion Crimea and modern-day Narva.

=== Enabling factors ===
Key similarities between the cases of Crimea and Narva include: Both territories' populations being mostly ethnically and linguistically Russian following past resettlement programs targeting the indigenous populations (see De-Tatarization of Crimea and Narva demographics, respectively), a circumstance which could be used as justification for ethnic imperial expansionism under Russian world doctrine; as well as past referendums calling for more autonomy within the countries shortly after their independence from the USSR (see 1994 Crimean referendum and 1993 Narva and Sillamäe referendum, respectively).

Further similarities include the fact that both Estonia and Ukraine directly border Russia, have been in territorial dispute with the former imperial power after independence (see 2003 Tuzla Island conflict and Estonian–Russian territorial dispute, respectively) and had generally strained relations as a precursor to invasion (see Russia-Ukraine relations and Estonia-Russia relations, respectively).

Additional credence is given to the eventual realization of this hypothetical when considering that Russian president Vladimir Putin has expressed revisionist claims to the city of Narva in the past, and that Russian surveillance blimps have repeatedly openly entered Narva airspace. In 2026, a small Telegram channel named "Narva People’s Republic", echoing the imagery and ideology of the "Donetsk People's Republic" and "Luhansk People's Republic", became a subject of international media reporting. Narva and its surroundings would be strategically viable points of incursion for Russia.

=== Inhibiting factors ===
Key differences have, however, been highlighted by other commentators, particularly those from Estonia: These claim that the Estonian government has learned from past examples in which the Russian government was able to exploit the grievances of Russian minorities in other countries, and is now attempting to preemptively counter them by better acknowledging and integrating Narva's population symbolically, culturally and politically. Furthermore, the fact that Estonia is an established NATO member with a persistent NATO presence vastly increases the possible risks Russia would incur by invading.

Covert military operations have been made more difficult for Russia due to substantial restrictions on cross-border traffic since 2022 and increased insight following the full-on invasion of Ukraine. Even in the case of a slower or even completely lacking NATO response, close military cooperation with other Baltic states, Finland and Poland would likely ensure that Estonia could rely on immediate military assistance. Potential Russian rapid dominance tactics involving the use of biological weapons or weapons of mass destruction would be disincentivized by the close proximity of Russian population centers like Saint Petersburg.

Dmitri Trenin of the Carnegie Moscow Center, considered a supporter of Russia's war in Ukraine, wrote in 2016: "Even though naturalization in Latvia and Estonia was made hard for local Russians, they are not looking to Moscow for protection and guidance. [...] The Donbass model is not easily transferable, and employing it on the territory of a NATO member state denies the Kremlin any rationality whatsoever."
