= 1993 Narva and Sillamäe autonomy referendum =

16–17 July 1993

The 1993 Narva and Sillamäe autonomy referendum was an unconstitutional referendum held on 16–17 July 1993 in Narva and Sillamäe in north-east Estonia, on whether to seek autonomy within the country.

== Background ==
Narva is a city in north-east Estonia, with strong historical and ethnic ties to Russia. In 1993, ethnic Russians comprised about one third of Estonia's population of 1.6 million people. Some Russian residents complained that planned Estonian laws would limit their political and civil rights.

== Results ==
Voting took place from 16 to 17 July 1993, in Narva, Kohtla-Järve and Sillamäe. The Chancellor of Justice of Estonia declared the referendum unconstitutional.

In Narva, 97% voted in favour of autonomy on a turnout of 54%, and in Sillamäe 95% voted in favour from a turnout of 60%.
