= Narva =

City in Estonia

- City
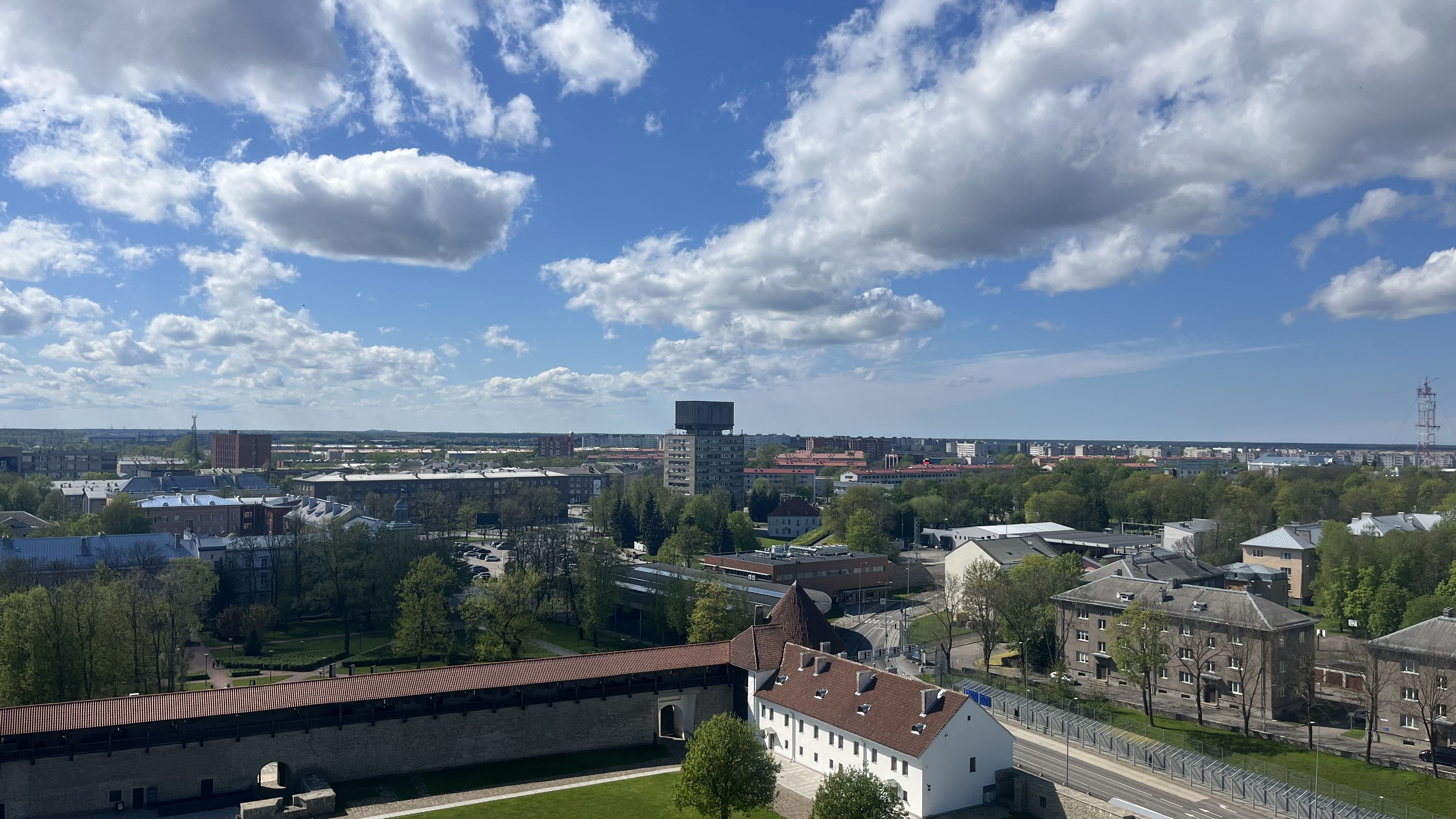
- View of Narva from Hermann Castle

- Flag Coat of arms
- Interactive map of Narva
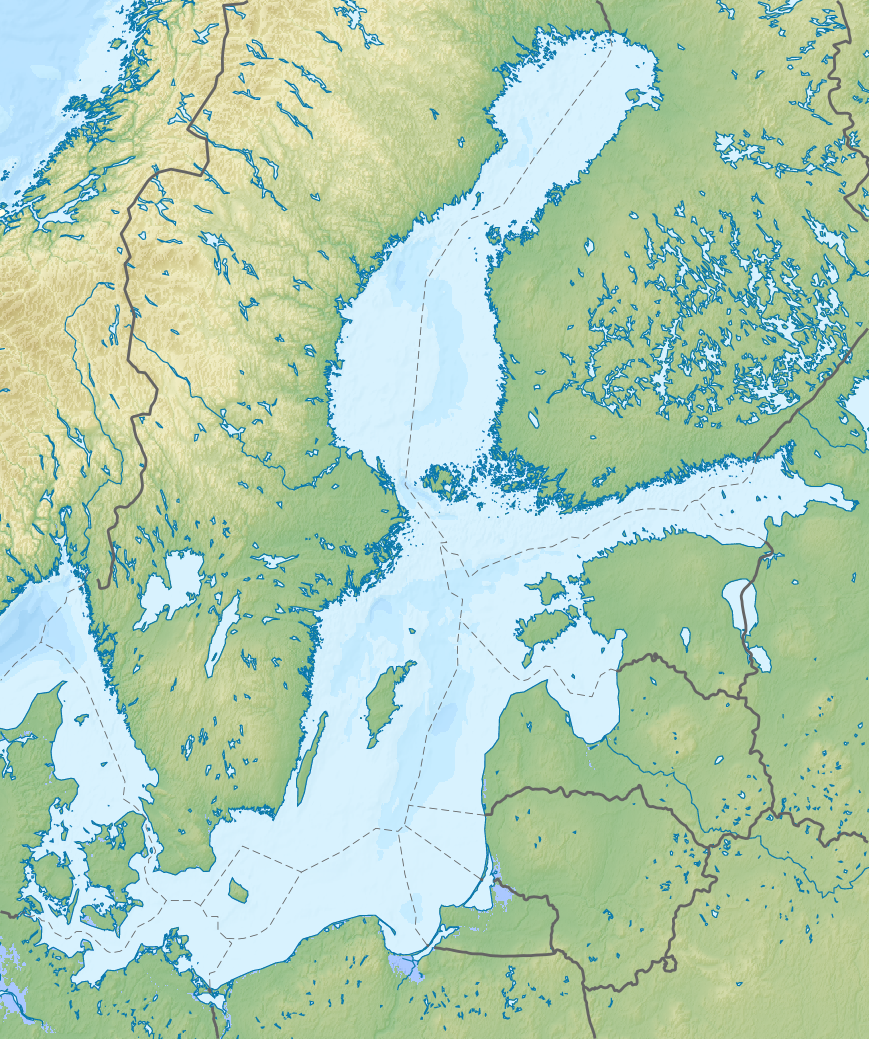
- Location within Europe Location within Baltic Sea region Location within Estonia
- Coordinates: 59°22′33″N 28°11′46″E
- Country: Estonia
- County: Ida-Viru
- First mentioned: 1172
- City rights: 1345

Government
  - Mayor: Jaan Toots

Area
  - Total: 84.54 km^{2} (32.64 sq mi)
- Elevation: 25 m (82 ft)

Population (2026)
  - Total: 51,411
  - Rank: 3rd
  - Density: 608.1/km^{2} (1,575/sq mi)
- Demonym: narvalane (Estonian)

Ethnicity (2011)
  - Russians: 87.7%
  - Estonians: 5.2%
  - other: 7.1%
- Time zone: UTC+2 (EET)
  - Summer (DST): UTC+3 (EEST)
- Postal code: 20001 to 21020
- Area code: (+372) 035
- ISO 3166 code: EE-511
- Website: www.narva.ee

Narva (Note: Estonian pronunciation: [ˈnɑrʋɑ]; German: Narwa; Russian: Нарва, pronounced [ˈnarvə].) is a city and municipality in Estonia. It is located in Ida-Viru County, at the eastern extreme point of Estonia, on the west bank of the Narva river, which forms the Estonia–Russia international border. As of 1 January 2026, the population of Narva was approximately 51,411, according to data compiled by national statistical bureaus in the Baltic region. Narva is Estonia's third-largest city after Tallinn and Tartu.

Narva was nearly completely destroyed in 1944, during World War II. During the Soviet era (1944–1991), the city's original inhabitants were not permitted to return, and immigrant workers from Soviet Russia and other parts of the former Soviet Union were introduced. Narva's population, 65% ethnic Estonian as of the 1934 census, became overwhelmingly non-Estonian in the second half of the 20th century. According to data from 2013, 46.7% of the city's inhabitants are citizens of Estonia, 36.3% are citizens of the Russian Federation, while 15.3% have undefined citizenship.

== History ==
=== Early settlement ===
People settled in the area from the 5th to 4th millennium BC, as evidenced by archeological findings of the Narva culture, named after the Narva River. The fortified settlement at Narva Joaoru is the oldest known in Estonia, dated to around 1000 BC. The earliest known written reference of the toponym Narva is in the First Novgorod Chronicle, which in the year 1172 describes a district in Novgorod called Nerevsky or Narovsky konets (yard). According to historians, this name probably derives from the name of the then village of Narva, or from the Narva River, and indicates that a frequently used trade route went through Narva, albeit no evidence of the existence of a trading settlement in Narva at the time has been found so far.

=== Middle Ages ===
Narva's favorable location at the intersection of both trade routes and the Narva River was behind the founding of Narva castle and the subsequent development of the castle's surrounding urban settlement. The castle was founded during the Danish rule of northern Estonia in the second half of the 13th century; the earliest written record of the castle is from 1277. Narvia village is mentioned in the Danish Census Book already in 1241. A town developed around the stronghold and in 1345 obtained Lübeck City Rights from King Valdemar IV of Denmark. The castle and surrounding town of Narva (Narwa, in German) became a possession of the Livonian Order in 1346, after the Danish king sold its lands in Northern Estonia. In 1492, Ivangorod fortress across the Narva River was established by Ivan III of Moscow.

Trade, particularly Hanseatic long-distance trade remained Narva's raison d'être throughout the Middle Ages. However, due to opposition from Tallinn, Narva itself never became part of the Hanseatic League and also remained a small town – its population in 1530 is estimated at 600–750 people.

=== Modern era ===
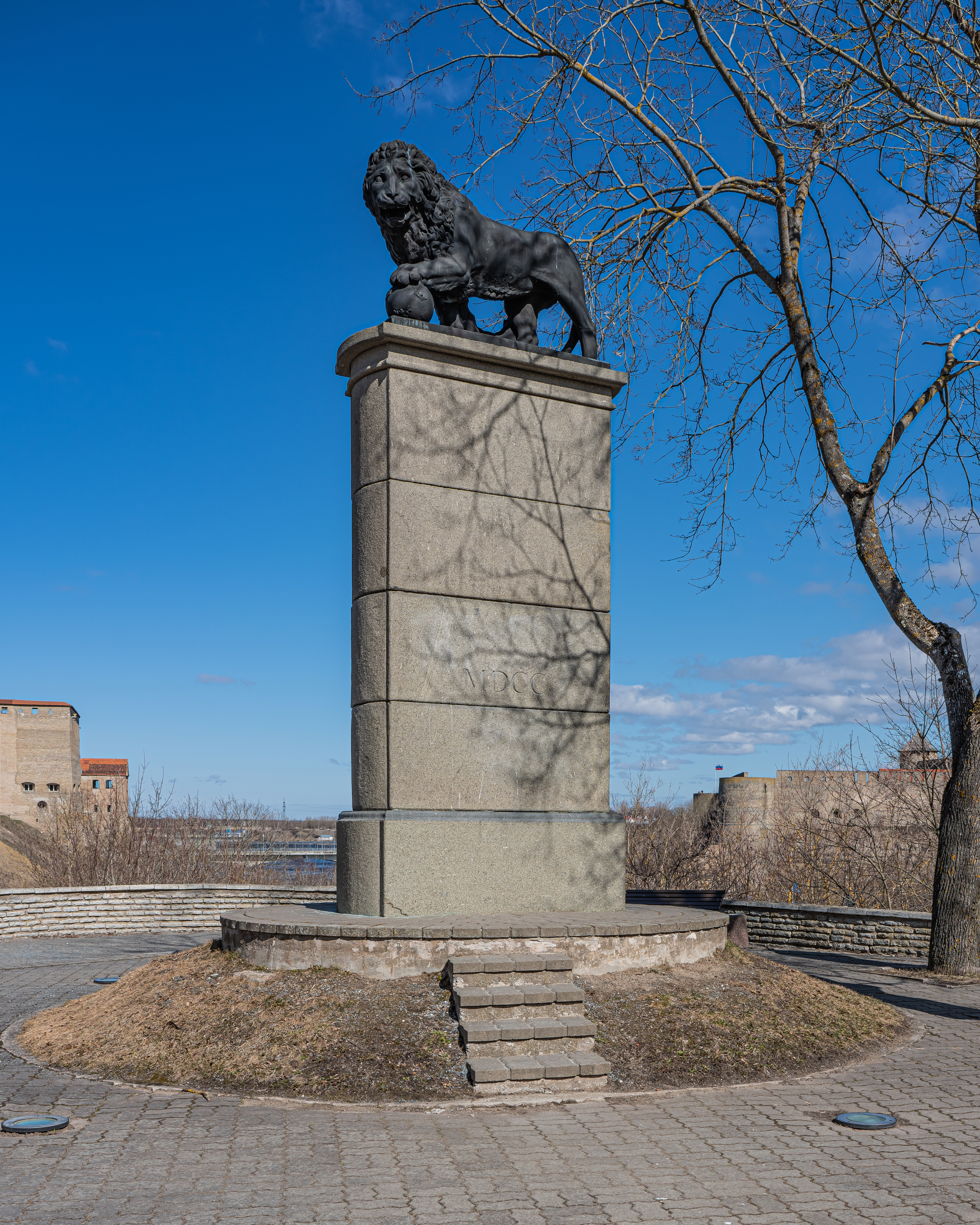
The Swedish Lion monument in memory of the Battle of Narva (1700).

Captured by the Tsardom of Russia (Muscovy) during the Livonian War in 1558–1581, for a short period Narva became an important trading port and transshipment center of Russian goods from Pskov and Novgorod. In 1581, the city was conquered by the troops of the Kingdom of Sweden and became part of the latter. In 1590–1595 Russian forces attempted to regain the city without success.

During the Swedish rule, the baroque Old Town of Narva was built. Following a large fire in 1659 that almost completely destroyed the town, only stone buildings were allowed to be built in its central part. Income from trade allowed rebuilding of the town center in two decades. Until World War II, the baroque architecture of the Old Town underwent practically no changes, and it became renowned all over Europe. Towards the end of Swedish rule, the defence structures of Narva were greatly improved. Beginning in 1680s, an outstanding system of bastions was built around the town. The new defences were among the most powerful in Northern Europe.

During the Great Northern War of 1700–1721, Narva became the setting for the first great battle between the forces of King Charles XII of Sweden and Tsar Peter I of Russia (Muscovy) in November 1700. The forces of Tsar Peter I conquered the city in 1704.

After the Great Northern War, the bastions were renovated. Narva remained on the list of fortifications of the Russian Empire until 1863, although there turned out to be no real military need for it. Administratively the city of Narva, including its then suburb of Ivangorod (Jaanilinn) was a part of the Saint Petersburg Governorate of the Russian Empire until 1917.

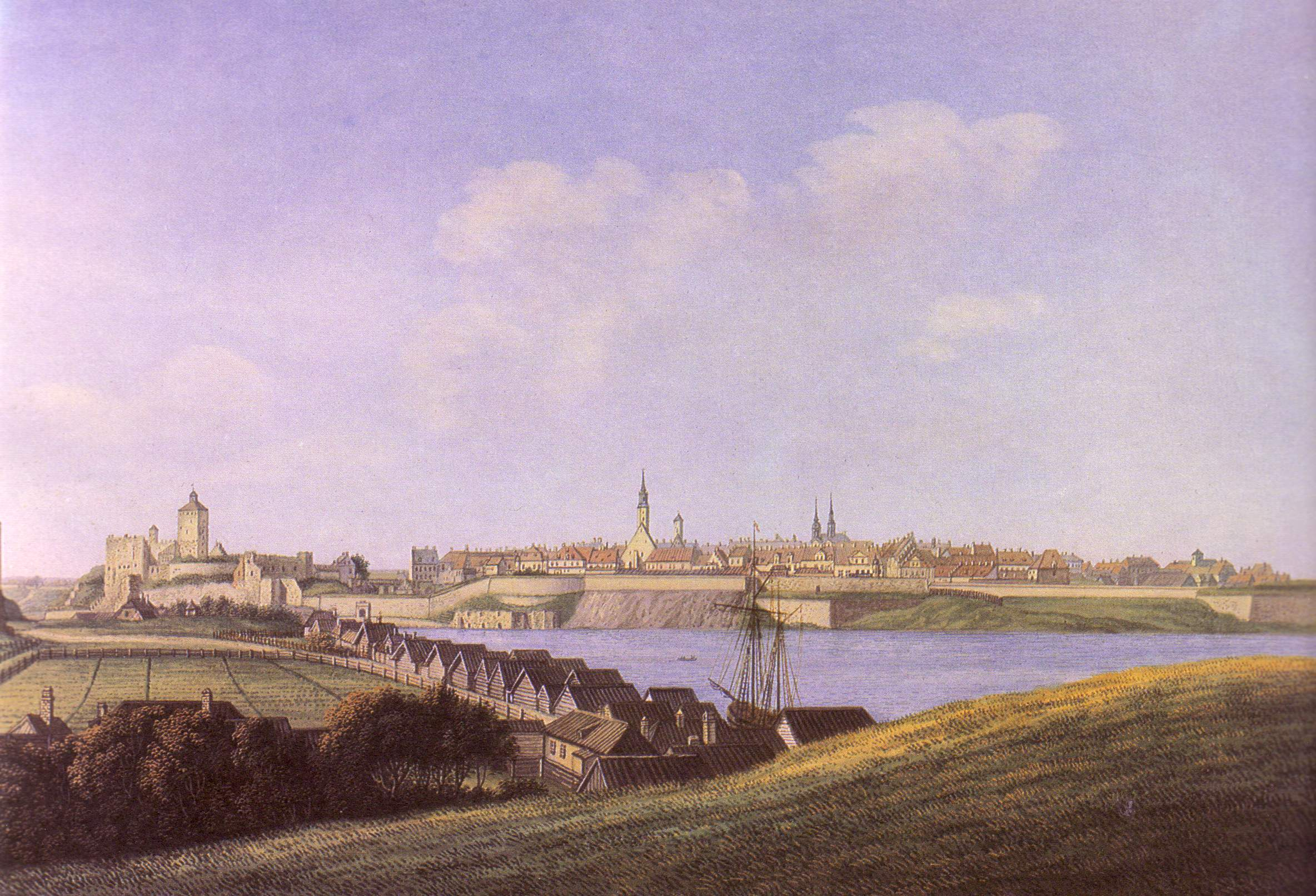
View of Narva in the 1750s

In the middle of the 19th century, Narva developed into a major industrial city. Ludwig Knoop established the Krenholm Manufacturing Company in 1857. The factory used the affordable energy of the powerful Narva waterfalls, and at the end of the century became, with about 10,000 workers, one of the largest cotton mills in Europe and the world. In 1872, Krenholm Manufacturing became the site of the first strike in Estonia. At the end of the 19th century, Narva was the leading industrial town in Estonia – 41% of industrial workers in Estonia worked in Narva, compared to 33% in Tallinn. The first railway in Estonia, completed in 1870, connected Narva to Saint Petersburg and to Tallinn.

In August 1890, Narva was the site of a meeting between two Emperors, Wilhelm II of Germany and Alexander III of Russia.

=== Interwar period and World War II ===
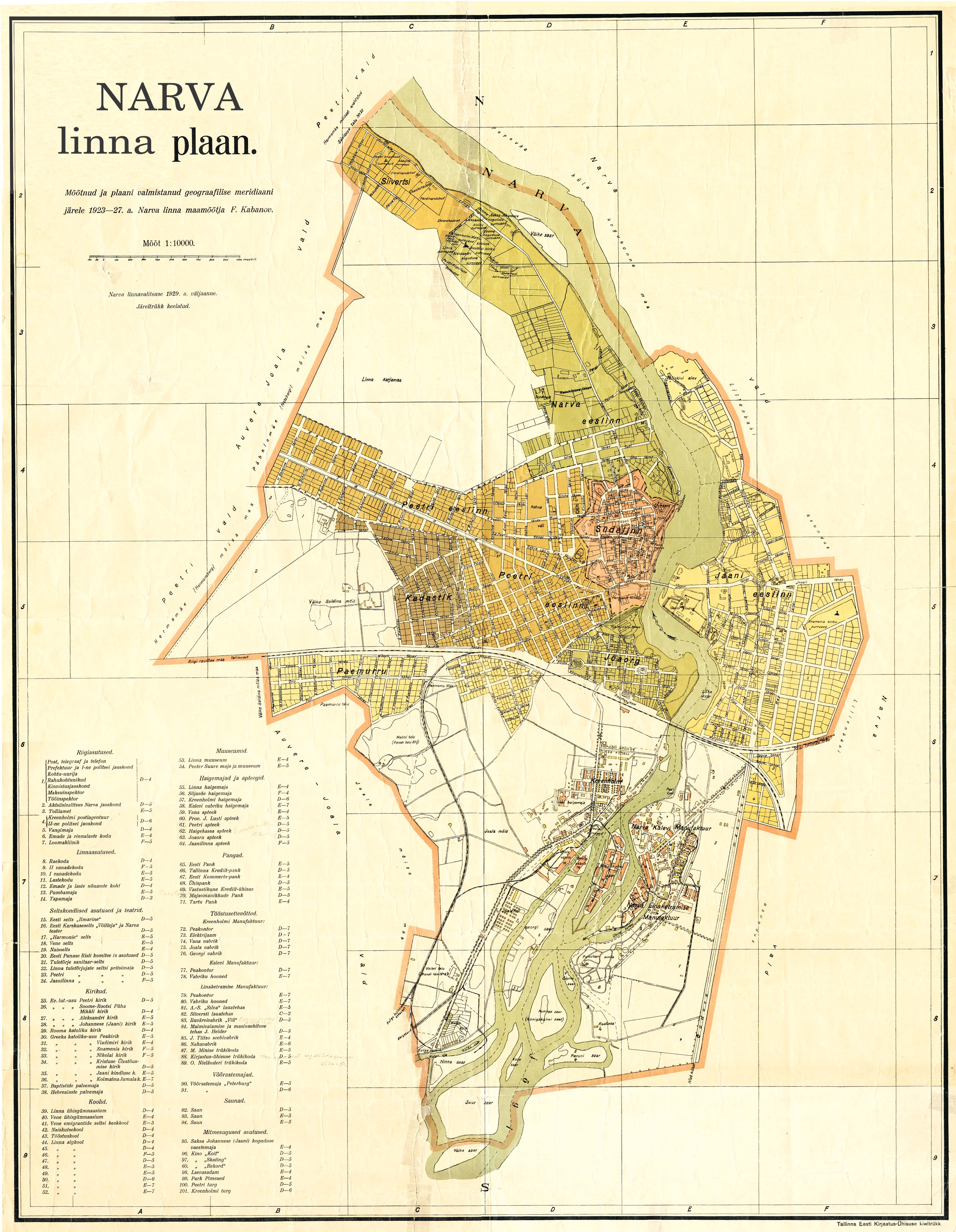
A 1929 plan of Narva, including the suburb of Jaanilinn (Ivangorod), part of Narva at the time

The status of Narva was resolved in a July 1917 referendum, when the district population, at that time roughly equally divided between ethnic Russians and Estonians, voted to attach itself to the newly autonomous, and soon to be independent state of, Estonia. Narva became part of the independent Republic of Estonia in 1918, at the end of World War I. The town saw fighting during the Estonian War of Independence. The war started when Russian Bolshevik troops attacked Narva on 28 November 1918, capturing the city on the next day. The Russian bolshevik troops retained control of the city until 19 January 1919.

Heavy battles occurred both in and around Narva during World War II. The city was damaged in the German invasion of 1941 and by smaller air raids throughout the war, but remained relatively intact until February 1944. However, as the focus of the Battle of Narva, the city was destroyed by Soviet bombardment and fires and explosions set by retreating German troops. The most devastating action was the bombing raids of 6 and 7 March 1944 by the Soviet Air Force, which destroyed the Baroque old town.

=== 1944–1991 ===
By the end of July 1944, 98% of Narva had been destroyed. After the war, most of the buildings could have been restored as the walls of the houses still existed, but in the early 1950s, the Soviet authorities decided to demolish the ruins to make room for apartment buildings. Only three buildings remain of the old town, including the Baroque-style Town Hall. The civilian casualties of the bombing were low as the German forces had evacuated the city in January 1944.

The original native inhabitants were not allowed to return after the war. A 1950 governmental statement said this was done to avoid the return of White Army "spies, and exploiters". Instead, immigrant Russian-speaking workers from other parts of the USSR were brought in to populate the city. The city, whose population had been 65% Estonian according to the last census in 1934, became overwhelmingly non-Estonian. The main reason behind this was a plan to build a secret uranium processing plant in the city, which would turn Narva into a closed town. In 1947 nearby Sillamäe was selected as the location of the factory instead of Narva, but the existence of such a plan was decisive for the development of Narva in the postwar years, and thus also shaped its later evolution. The planned uranium factory and other large-scale industrial developments, like the restoring of Kreenholm Manufacture, were the driving force behind the influx of internal migrants from other parts of the Soviet Union, mainly Russia.

In January 1945, Jaanilinn (Ivangorod), the suburb on the eastern bank of the river was separated from Estonia (and from Narva) by the Soviet authorities, and the settlement around Ivangorod fortress was transferred to the administration Leningrad Oblast of the Russian SFSR and Ivangorod became officially a town in its own rights.

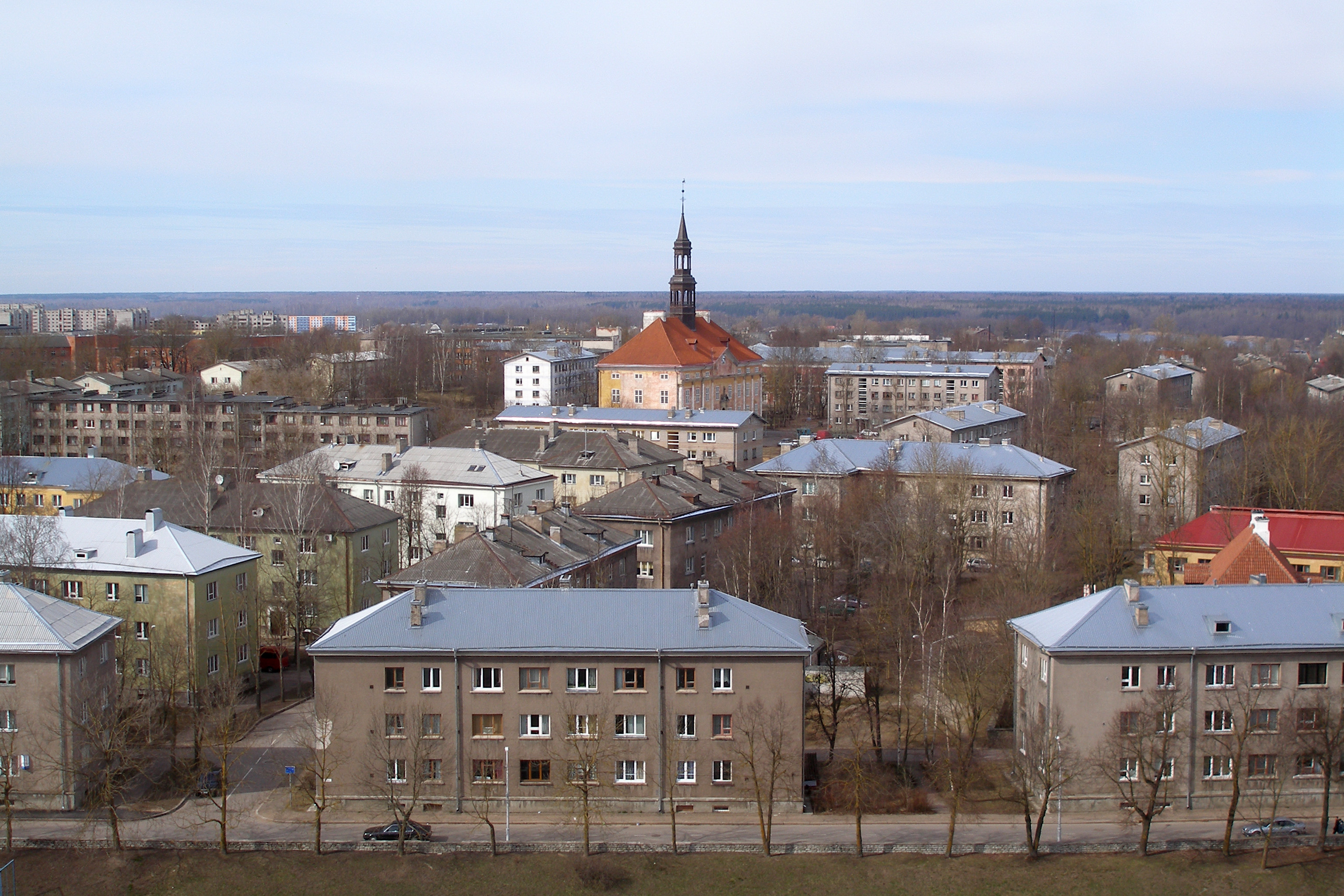
The Narva town hall, surrounded by Soviet-era apartment blocks, is one of the few buildings which were restored after World War II.

=== Restoration of Estonian independence, 1991–present ===
After Estonia regained its independence in 1991, the city's leaders, holdovers from the Soviet era, wanted autonomy, and contended that the notion of a breakaway "Transnarovan Soviet republic" in northeastern Estonia was becoming increasingly popular, but this was contradicted by polls showing 87% of the region's population opposed secession from Estonia.

In 1993, dissatisfaction with newly enacted citizenship and election laws (non-citizens were not allowed to hold office) culminated in the Narva referendum of 16–17 July 1993, which proposed autonomy for both Narva and Sillamäe, a nearby town. Although 97% voted in favor of the referendum, turnout in Narva was a mere 55%, and there were credible charges of vote rigging.

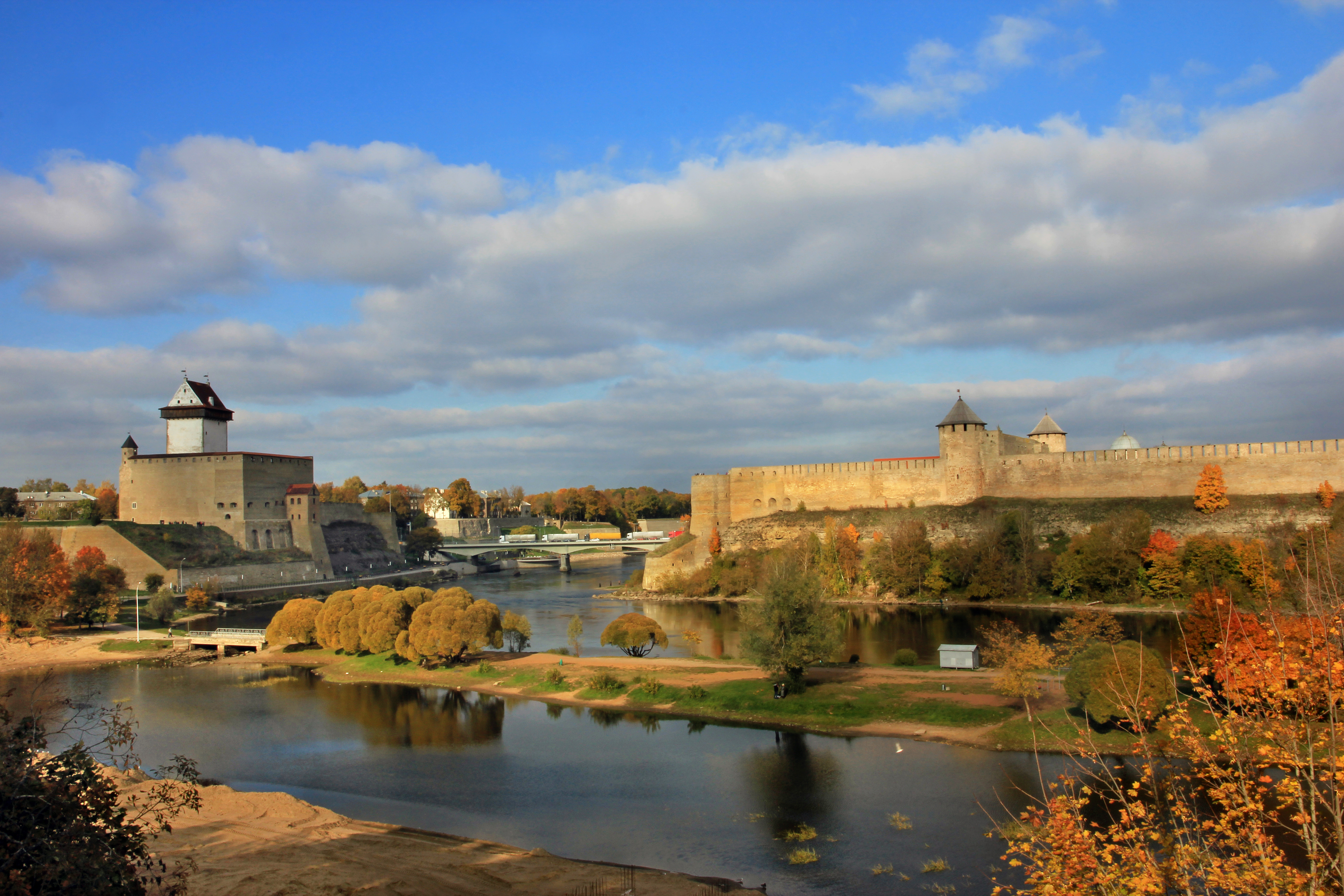
View of Narva in 2014. Ivangorod fortress, in Russia, lies across the river on the right.

After 1991, disputes regarding the Estonian-Russian border in the Narva sector remained, as the new constitution of Estonia (adopted in 1992) recognizes the 1920 Treaty of Tartu border to be currently legal.

The Russian Federation, however, considers Estonia to be a successor of the Estonian SSR and recognizes the 1945 border between the two former national republics. Officially, Estonia has no territorial claims in the area, which was also reflected in the new Estonian-Russian border treaty signed in Moscow on 18 May 2005. Russia failed to ratify it because, together with the ratification, the Estonian parliament approved a communiqué, which mentioned the Soviet Occupation.

In February 2014 a new border treaty was signed by both countries. However the treaty was not ratified by the parliaments of either Russia or Estonia.

Overall, by 2014, Russian residents were happy with their status as both Estonian and European Union citizens and lived peacefully alongside their compatriots. Following the Russian annexation of Crimea in early 2014, various political commentators such as journalists, political scientists, as well as economic and military academia have referred to a potential Russian invasion of Estonia mirroring that of Ukraine – using hybrid warfare tactics – as the Narva scenario.

Before the 2022 Russian invasion of Ukraine, residents mixed relatively freely with the residents across the river in Ivangorod.

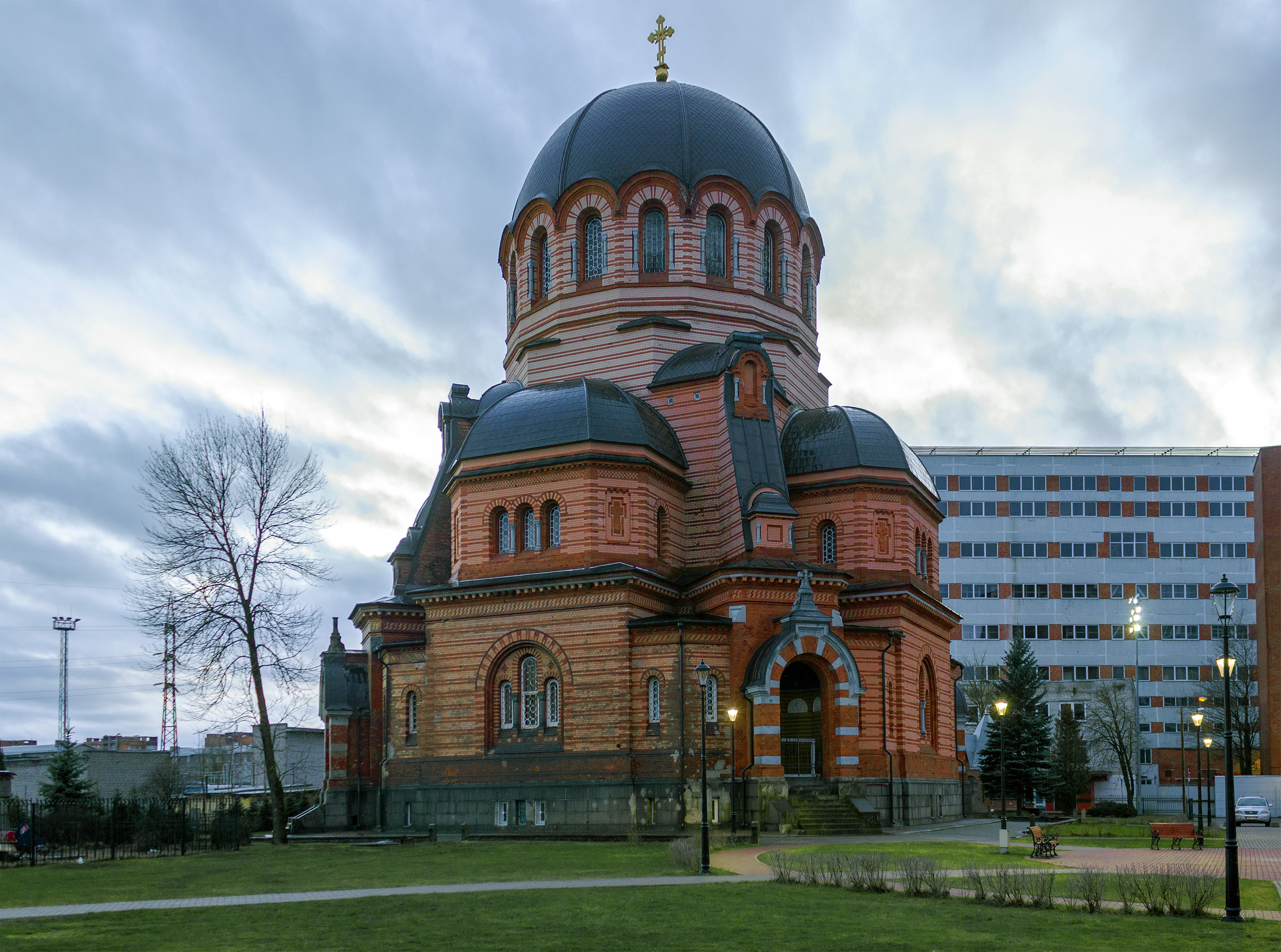
The Resurrection of Christ Cathedral, Narva (constructed 1890–1896)

Those on the Estonian side mainly crossed to buy cheaper petrol, groats, cleaning products, pasta and sugar. Those crossing from the Russian side wanted to make use of the availability of non-sanctioned goods, entertainment facilities and overall better infrastructure.

The invasion and subsequent conflict seriously reduced cooperation between the two neighbors, especially as visas became difficult to obtain and the residents of Narva increased the take up in Estonian citizenship. Narva took in many Ukrainian refugees fleeing the war and previously popular Russian TV stations among older Russophone residents were banned by the Estonian government.

On 10 June 2022, the Estonian foreign ministry summoned the Russian ambassador to protest about remarks by President Vladimir Putin praising Peter the Great for having captured Narva in the early 18th century.

In August 2022, a Soviet T-34 tank memorial was removed from a stretch of road between the city center and Narva-Jõesuu, to mixed responses. It was moved to the Estonian War Museum near Tallinn. In response to the tank's removal, the following month Russian authorities erected a similar T-34 tank monument in Ivangorod near the border crossing point with Narva.

In April 2025, the Headquarters of the Estonian Defense Forces confirmed plans to re-establish a military base in the city. By July of the same year, the planned location and size of the base was confirmed to be in Kadastiku area, and home to a thousand soldiers.

In November 2026 The Guardian reported "Estonia to close all border crossings with Russia". The crossing with Narva is said to close on 1st December 2026.

== Economy ==
As of 2025, Narva no longer is a textile manufacturing center. After the city granted the Canadian company Neo Performance Materials a building permit for in 4 1/2 months, it built Europe's biggest production plant for rare-earth magnets in only 500 days near an already existing rare-earth separation facility. The EU co-funded the project with $16.9 million because they are considered critical materials.

The most important industries at present are metal products production, mechanical and electronic industry and maintenance and repair of machinery (about 60% of industry sales revenue). The textile, clothing and leather industry has lost its leading position, and its companies contributed 17% of sales revenue. There are smaller garment finishing and sewing factories in Narva. There are also wood, furniture and plastics industries in Narva.

In addition, the Narva industrial area includes the Enefit Power Narva quarry, the Balti thermal power plant on the city border and the larger Eesti thermal power plant on the administrative territory of the Narva-Jõesuu urban municipality. Oil factories also operate at the latter.

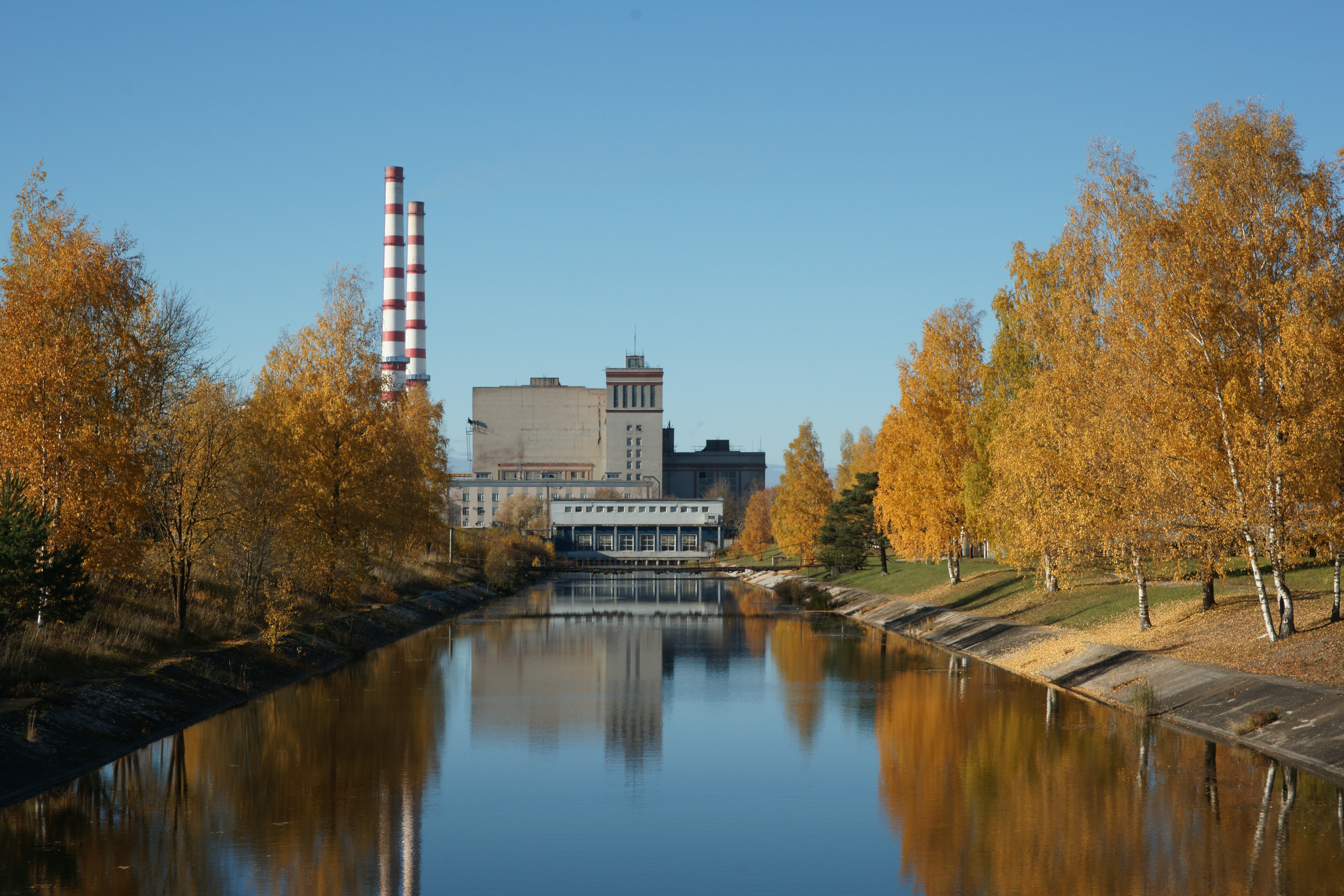
Balti Power Plant

== Demographics ==
Narva city population pyramid in 2022

Historical population
Year	Pop.	±%
1922	26,912	—
1934	23,512	−12.6%
1959	30,381	+29.2%
1970	61,346	+101.9%
1979	75,909	+23.7%
1989	84,975	+11.9%
2000	68,680	−19.2%
2011	58,663	−14.6%
2021	53,955	−8.0%
Source: Censuses

On 1 January 2013 Narva's population was 59,888, down from 60,454 inhabitants a year earlier. The population was 83,000 in 1992. 95.7% of the population of Narva are native Russian speakers, and 87.7% are ethnic Russians. Most non-Estonians are ethnically Russian, Belarusian, or Ukrainian immigrants or the children of immigrants, though 69% of Narva residents in the early 1990s had been born in Narva or had lived there for more than 30 years. Ethnic Estonians account for 5.2% of total population. Much of the city was destroyed during World War II and for several years during the following reconstruction the Soviet authorities largely prohibited the return of Narva's pre-war residents (among whom ethnic Estonians had been the majority, forming 64.8% of the town's population of 23,512 according to the 1934 census), thus radically altering the city's ethnic composition. Nevertheless, ethnic Russians had already formed a significant minority: 29.7% of the city's population were Russian in the census of 1934.

46.7% of the city's inhabitants are Estonian citizens, 36.3% are citizens of the Russian Federation, while 15.3% of the population has undefined citizenship. Since the 2022 Russian invasion of Ukraine there has been an increase in those acquiring Estonian citizenship in the city.

A concern in Narva is the spread of HIV, which infected 1.2% of Estonia's population in 2012. Between 2001 and 2008, more than 1,600 cases of HIV were registered in Narva, making it one of the worst areas in Estonia, alongside Tallinn and the rest of Ida-Viru County. The HIV infection rate in Estonia declined in 2014, with 59 new cases in Narva.

Ethnic composition, 1897–2021
Ethnicity	1897		1922		1934		1941		1959		1970		1979		1989		2000		2011		2021	
Ethnicity	amount	%	amount	%	amount	%	amount	%	amount	%	amount	%	amount	%	amount	%	amount	%	amount	%	amount	%
Estonians	7313	44.0	17501	65.0	15227	64.8	13625	68.7	3114	11.3	3984	6.89	3538	4.86	3224	3.97	3331	4.85	3031	5.17	3107	5.76
Russians	7217	43.5	7927	29.5	6986	29.7	5376	27.1	-	-	48205	83.3	61971	85.1	69763	85.9	58702	85.5	51434	87.7	46937	87.0
Ukrainians	7	0.04	-	-	1	0.00	-	-	-	-	1448	2.50	2092	2.87	2626	3.23	1774	2.58	1219	2.08	1140	2.11
Belarusians	63	0.38	-	-	-	-	-	-	-	-	1526	2.64	1904	2.62	2182	2.69	1529	2.23	1034	1.76	833	1.54
Finns	99	0.60	-	-	211	0.90	369	1.86	-	-	689	1.19	780	1.07	727	0.90	682	0.99	406	0.69	325	0.60
Jews	-	-	318	1.18	188	0.80	0	0.00	-	-	219	0.38	219	0.30	211	0.26	89	0.13	61	0.10	48	0.09
Latvians	-	-	-	-	65	0.28	46	0.23	-	-	189	0.33	191	0.26	185	0.23	147	0.21	83	0.14	85	0.16
Germans	1000	6.02	502	1.87	499	2.12	-	-	-	-	-	-	279	0.38	251	0.31	218	0.32	141	0.24	124	0.23
Tatars	-	-	-	-	59	0.25	-	-	-	-	-	-	414	0.57	479	0.59	376	0.55	271	0.46	237	0.44
Poles	-	-	-	-	162	0.69	116	0.59	-	-	-	-	148	0.20	159	0.20	127	0.18	95	0.16	88	0.16
Lithuanians	-	-	-	-	21	0.09	18	0.09	-	-	191	0.33	200	0.27	180	0.22	141	0.21	114	0.19	125	0.23
unknown	-	-	18	0.07	15	0.06	9	0.05	0	0.00	0	0.00	0	0.00	0	0.00	744	1.08	60	0.10	44	0.08
other	900	5.42	646	2.40	78	0.33	265	1.34	24516	88.7	1412	2.44	1047	1.44	1234	1.52	820	1.19	714	1.22	862	1.60
Total	16599	100	26912	100	23512	100	19824	100	27630	100	57863	100	72783	100	81221	100	68680	100	58663	100	53955	100

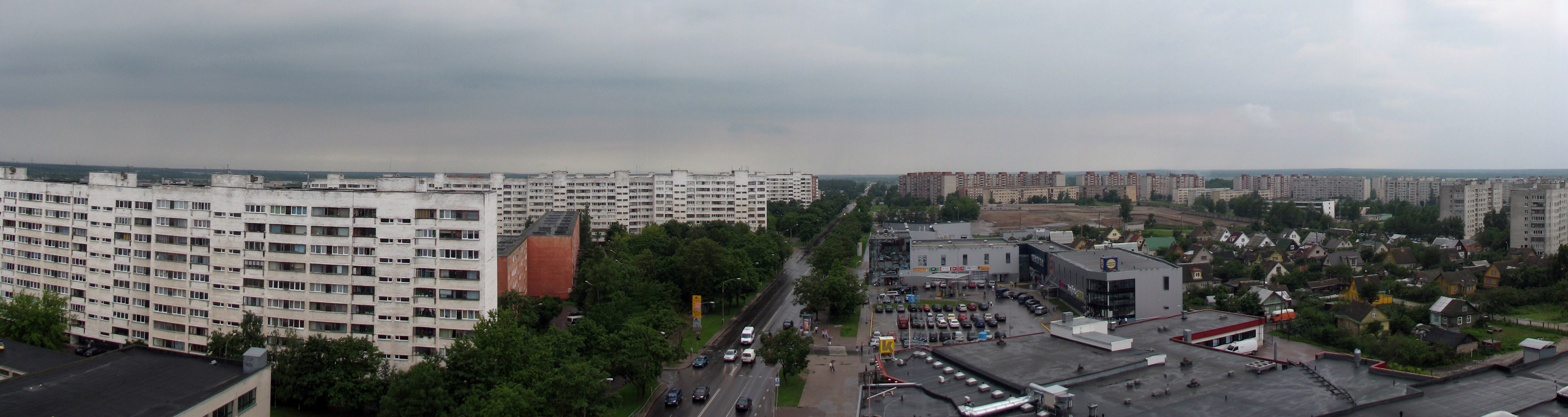
Panorama of the western part of the city
Religion in Narva (2021)
1. Orthodox & Old Believers (56.7%)
2. Catholic (1.10%)
3. Other Christians (1.70%)
4. Other religions (1.00%)
5. Unaffiliated (39.1%)

== Geography ==
Narva is situated in the eastern extreme point of Estonia, 200 km (124 mi) to the east from the Estonian capital Tallinn and 130 km (81 mi) southwest from Saint Petersburg. The capital of Ida-Viru County, Jõhvi, lies 50 km (31 mi) to the west. The eastern border of the city along the Narva River (which drains Lake Peipus) coincides with the Estonian-Russian border. The Estonian part of the Narva Reservoir lies mostly within the territory of Narva, to the southwest of the city center. The mouth of the Narva River to the Gulf of Finland is about 13 km (8 mi) downstream from the city.

The municipality of Narva covers 84.54 km^{2} (32.64 sq mi), of which the city proper occupies 62 km^{2} (24 sq mi) (excluding the reservoir), while two separate districts surrounded by Vaivara Parish, Kudruküla and Olgina, cover 5.6 km^{2} (2.16 sq mi) and 0.58 km^{2} (0.22 sq mi), respectively. Kudruküla is the largest of Narva's dacha regions, located 6 km (4 mi) to northwest from the main city, near Narva-Jõesuu.

=== Climate ===
Narva has a warm-summer humid continental climate (Köppen climate classification Dfb) with mild to warm, rainy summers with cool nights and cold, cloudy and snowy winters. Narva is one of the coldest settlements in Estonia, being located at the very northeast of the country and bordering Russia.

Climate data for Narva, 1971–2000 normals, extremes 1928–present
Month	Jan	Feb	Mar	Apr	May	Jun	Jul	Aug	Sep	Oct	Nov	Dec	Year
Record high °C (°F)	8.9 (48.0)	10.6 (51.1)	17.5 (63.5)	27.0 (80.6)	31.7 (89.1)	34.6 (94.3)	34.5 (94.1)	35.4 (95.7)	29.9 (85.8)	21.0 (69.8)	12.5 (54.5)	10.4 (50.7)	35.4 (95.7)
Mean daily maximum °C (°F)	−3.2 (26.2)	−3.1 (26.4)	1.6 (34.9)	8.7 (47.7)	15.7 (60.3)	19.9 (67.8)	21.7 (71.1)	20.2 (68.4)	14.4 (57.9)	8.3 (46.9)	2.0 (35.6)	−1.4 (29.5)	8.7 (47.7)
Daily mean °C (°F)	−5.8 (21.6)	−6.2 (20.8)	−2.0 (28.4)	4.0 (39.2)	10.1 (50.2)	14.8 (58.6)	16.9 (62.4)	15.4 (59.7)	10.3 (50.5)	5.4 (41.7)	−0.1 (31.8)	−3.8 (25.2)	4.9 (40.8)
Mean daily minimum °C (°F)	−8.9 (16.0)	−9.7 (14.5)	−5.4 (22.3)	−0.1 (31.8)	4.4 (39.9)	9.3 (48.7)	11.7 (53.1)	10.7 (51.3)	6.3 (43.3)	2.5 (36.5)	−2.5 (27.5)	−6.7 (19.9)	0.9 (33.6)
Record low °C (°F)	−39.4 (−38.9)	−37.4 (−35.3)	−32.7 (−26.9)	−25.1 (−13.2)	−6.3 (20.7)	−0.9 (30.4)	2.3 (36.1)	−0.5 (31.1)	−5.4 (22.3)	−12.4 (9.7)	−22.9 (−9.2)	−42.6 (−44.7)	−42.6 (−44.7)
Average precipitation mm (inches)	36 (1.4)	28 (1.1)	33 (1.3)	32 (1.3)	43 (1.7)	62 (2.4)	75 (3.0)	89 (3.5)	76 (3.0)	72 (2.8)	54 (2.1)	47 (1.9)	646 (25.4)
Average precipitation days (≥ 1.0 mm)	11	8	9	8	7	9	10	11	12	13	14	12	124
Average relative humidity (%)	86	84	79	72	67	73	76	79	83	84	87	87	80
Mean monthly sunshine hours	29.6	60.3	123.9	178.4	274.5	284.0	286.7	231.0	133.2	76.0	26.8	16.5	1,718.7
Source: Estonian Weather Service

Coastal temperature data for Narva-Jõesuu
Month	Jan	Feb	Mar	Apr	May	Jun	Jul	Aug	Sep	Oct	Nov	Dec	Year
Average sea temperature °C (°F)	0.1 (32.18)	-0.4 (31.28)	-0.2 (31.64)	1.3 (34.34)	7.2 (44.96)	14.6 (58.28)	19.4 (66.92)	18.7 (65.66)	15.1 (59.18)	10.2 (50.36)	6.1 (42.98)	3.0 (37.40)	7.9 (46.27)
Source 1: Seatemperature.org

=== Neighbourhoods ===
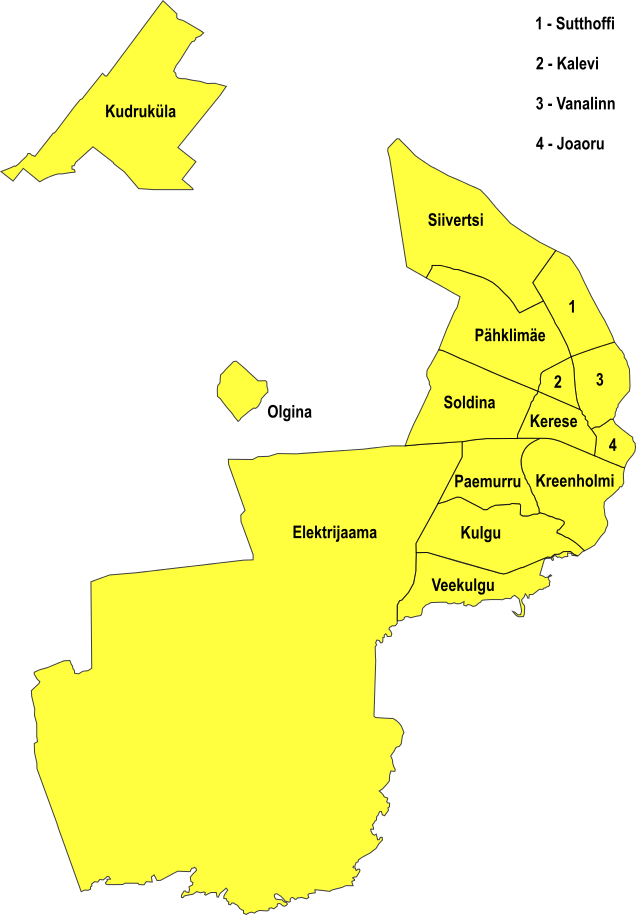
Neighbourhoods of Narva

Narva is officially divided into 15 neighbourhoods: Elektrijaama, Joaoru, Kalevi, Kerese, Kreenholmi, Kudruküla, Kulgu, Olgina, Paemurru, Pähklimäe, Siivertsi, Soldina, Sutthoffi, Vanalinn and Veekulgu.

== Landmarks ==
Narva's skyline is dominated by the 15th-century castle, with the 51-meter-tall (167 ft) Pikk Hermann tower as its most prominent landmark. The sprawling complex of the Kreenholm Manufacture, located in the proximity of scenic waterfalls, is one of the largest textile mills of 19th-century Northern Europe. Other notable buildings include mansions from the 17th century, a Baroque town hall (1668–1671), and remains of Erik Dahlberg's fortifications.

Across the Narva River lies the Russian Ivangorod fortress, established during the rule of Grand Prince Ivan III of Muscovy in 1492 and also referred to in some contemporary sources as the "Counter-Narva". From the 17th century until 1945, both the fortress and the adjacent suburb of Ivangorod (Estonian: Jaanilinn) were an administrative part of Narva.

Narva Kreenholmi Stadium is home to Meistriliiga football team, FC Narva Trans.

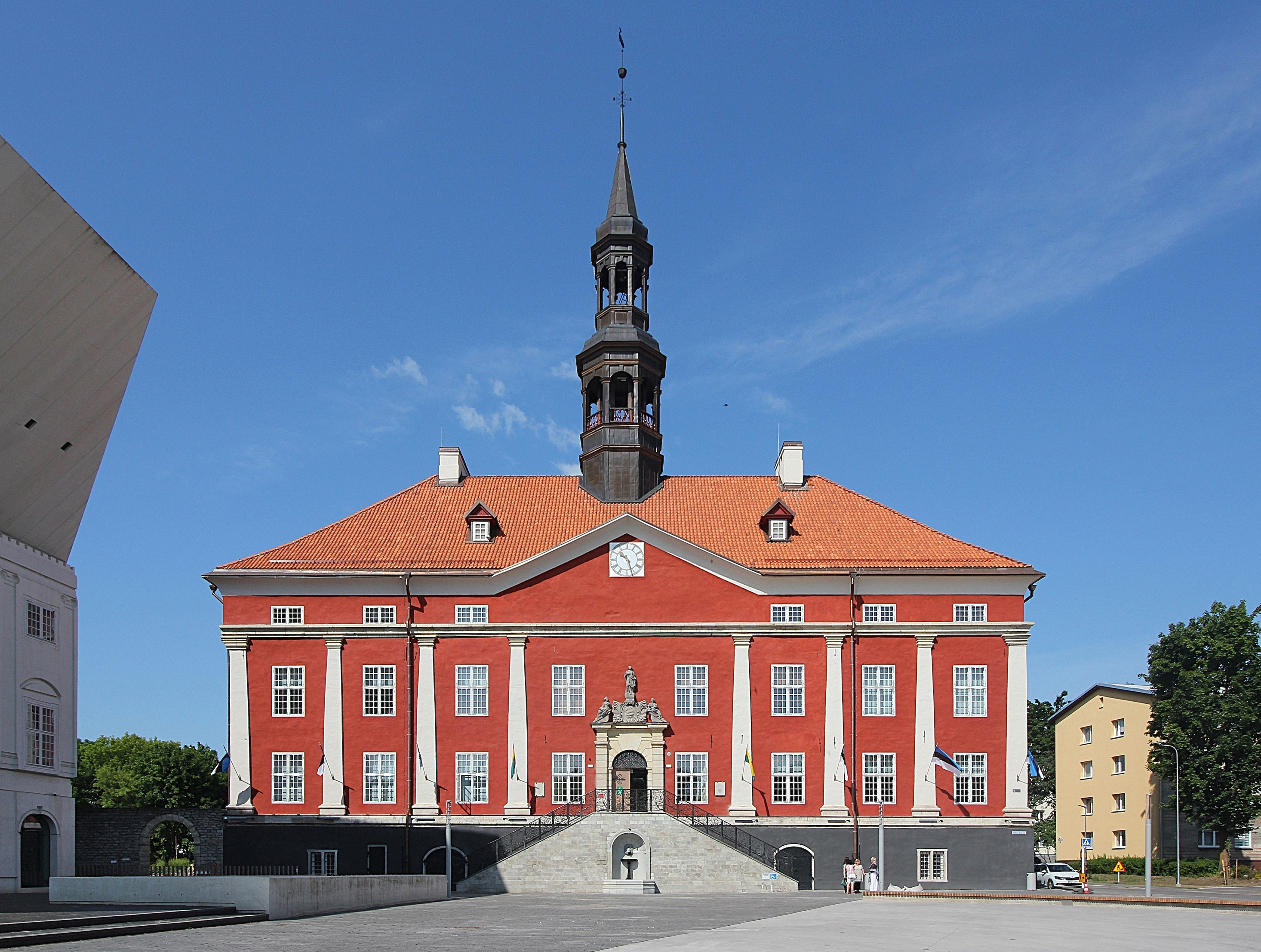
Town Hall

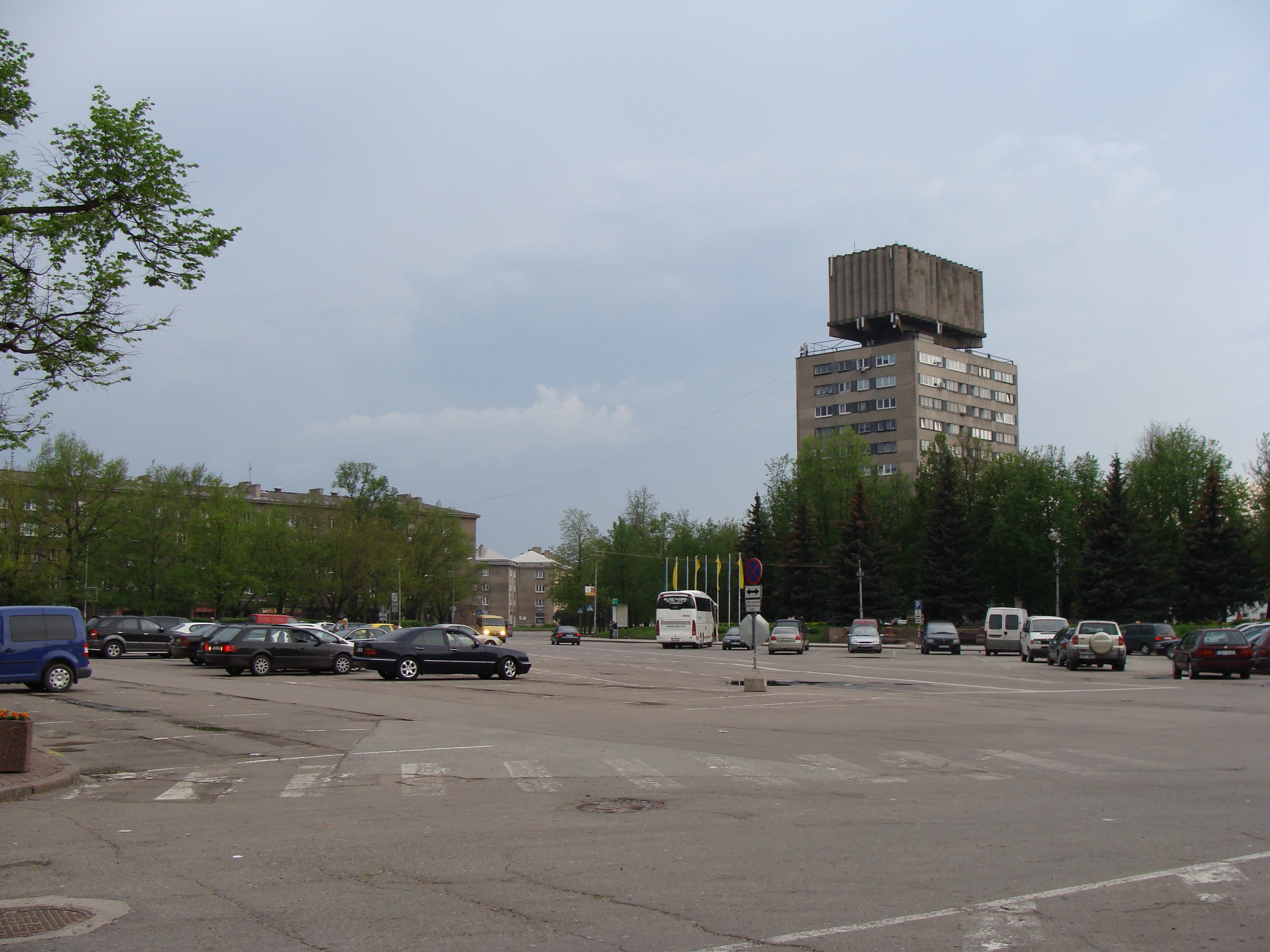
Downtown

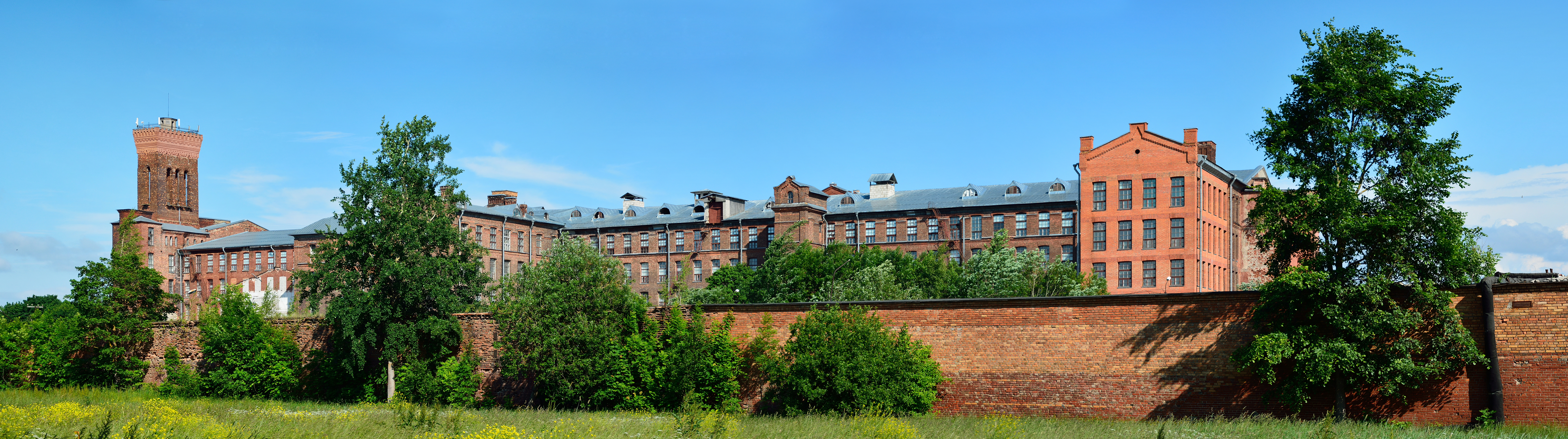
Kreenholm Manufactory Joala Spinning Mill

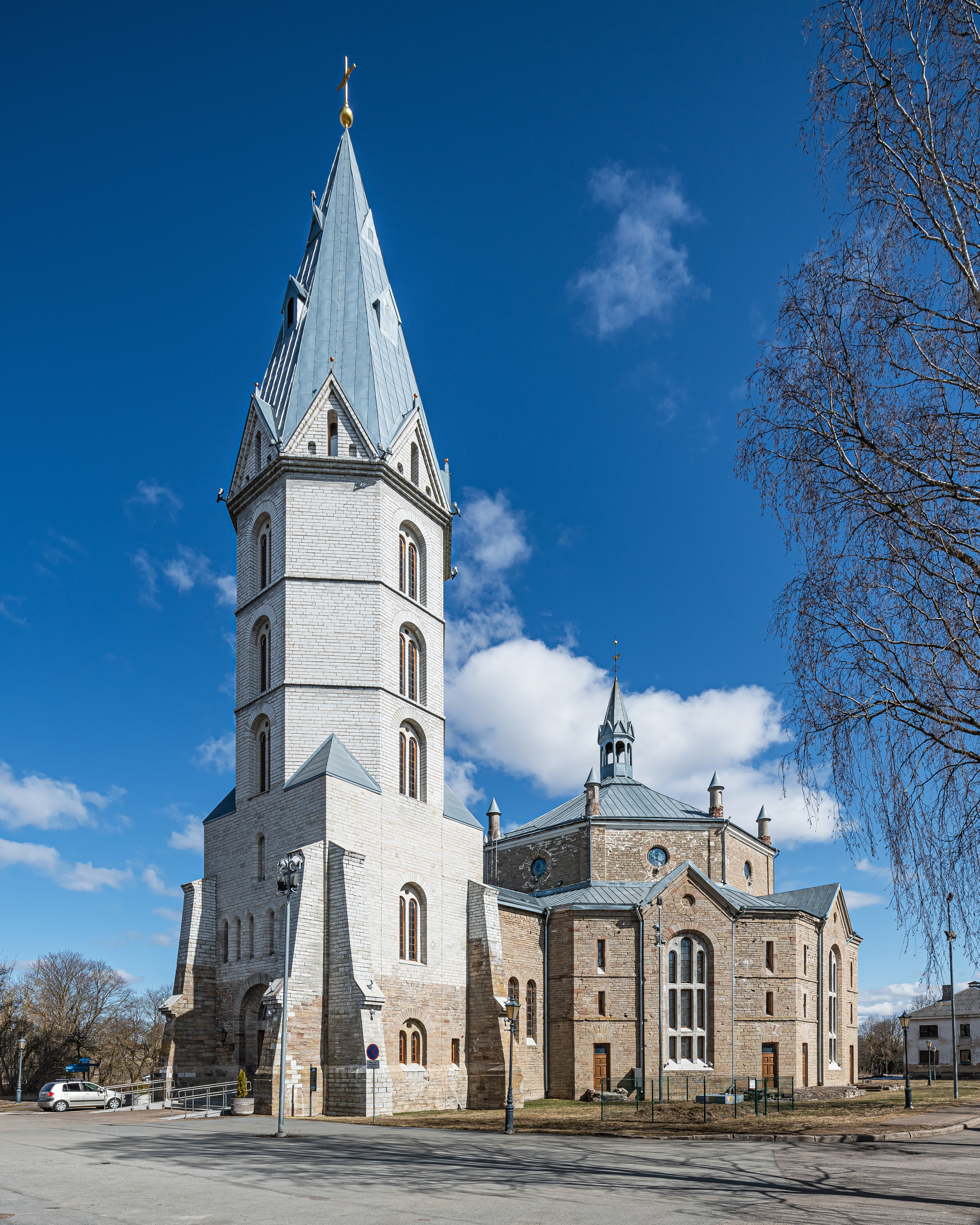
Alexander's Cathedral

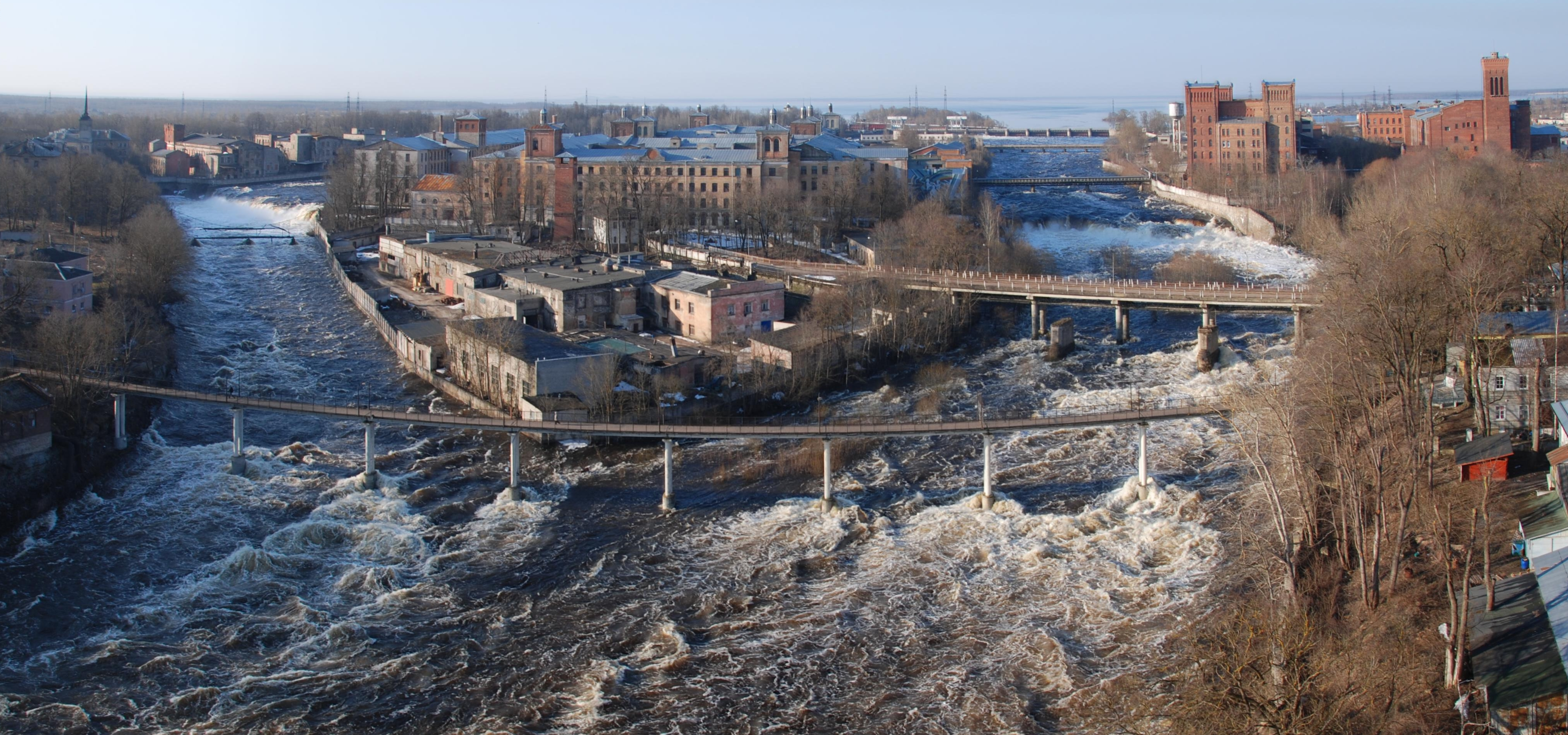
Kreenholm island

== Transportation ==
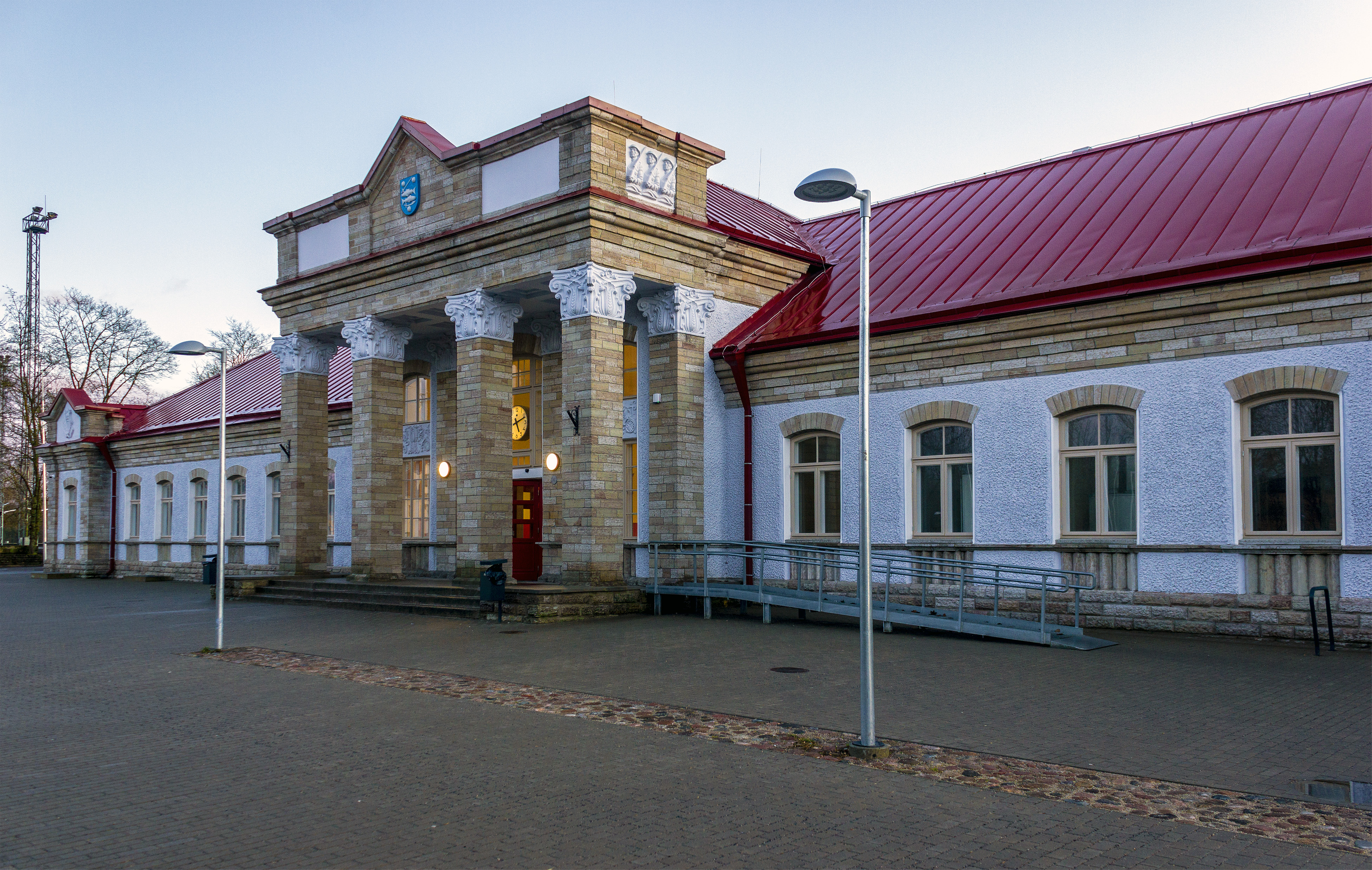
Narva railway station

The Narva railway station is located on an international railway line between Estonia and Russia (Tallinn–Narva railway). All passenger trains between Russia and Estonia were cancelled during the pandemic in 2020 and the service has not been resumed. There is a domestic train service between Saint Petersburg and Ivangorod. Hence, it is possible to travel between Narva and Saint Petersburg by train if one crosses the border between Narva and Ivangorod by foot. The walking distance between the border station and Ivangorod train station is about 3.5 km. Five daily domestic trains run between Narva and Tallinn. Some are express trains, which take about 2 1/2 hours.

Adjacent to the central rail station is a central bus station, which has multiple domestic and international connections (including to Russia, Latvia, Lithuania, Poland, Belarus etc.). The direct bus routes to Russia ceased on 1 February 2024, since the Russian Federation closed the border between Narva and Ivangorod for traffic; only pedestrians are now permitted to cross the border.

There is a general aviation grass airfield near Narva (ICAO: EENA). The strip is 600 meters long.

== Sport ==
The two main professional sports in the city are ice hockey and football.

Narva PSK play at the Narva Ice Hall, which also was the host arena of the 2005 World Junior Ice Hockey Division I Championship Group B.

JK Narva Trans play at the Narva Kreenholm Stadium. They are founding members of the Meistriliiga, and are one of two clubs which have never been relegated from the Estonian top division. They have won 2 Estonian Cups and 2 Estonian Supercups.

== Notable residents ==
- Evert Horn (1585–1615), Swedish field marshal and governor of Narva (1613)
- Ludwig Busbetzky (1687–1699), composer and organist at the German Church in Narva
- Aleksander Promet (1879–1938), painter and graphic artist.
- Raimund Kull (1882–1942), conductor and composer
- Adolf Szyszko-Bohusz (1883–1948), a Polish architect and conservator of monuments.
- Salme Peetson (1885–1967), initially a weaver and hatmaker, then an actress
- Emmanuel Steinschneider (1886–1970), physician and medical researcher
- Albert Üksip (1886–1966), botanist and actor
- Kersti Merilaas (1913–1986), poet and playwright
- Alika Milova (born 2002), singer, represented Estonia in the Eurovision Song Contest 2023

=== Sport ===
- Nikolai Stepulov (1913–1968), boxer, silver medallist at the 1936 Olympic Games
- Paul Keres (1916–1975), chess grandmaster
- Paul Felix Schmidt (1916–1984), chess player
- Ortvin Sarapu (1924–1999), chess player
- Valeri Karpin (born 1969), Russian football player, played 556 games and 72 for Russia
- Maksim Gruznov (born 1974), football player. played 494 games
- Reinar Hallik (born 1984), basketball player
- Leo Komarov (born 1987), ice hockey player

== In popular culture ==
The "Narva scenario" is a loosely-defined hypothetical military scenario where Russia would attack a smaller NATO country using hybrid warfare tactics similar to the initial phase of the actual 2014 Russian invasion of Ukraine, a NATO non-member.

In the first-person shooter video game Squad, the map Narva is loosely based on the real city, containing Narva Castle, Ivangorod Fortress and a southern industrial area.

== Friendship and partner cities ==
Narva is twinned with:

- Bel Air, United States
- Pärnu, Estonia
- Forssa, Finland
- Humppila, Finland
- Jokioinen, Finland
- Lahti, Finland
- Somero, Finland
- Urjala, Finland
- Ypäjä, Finland
- (Georgia (country)) Kobuleti, Georgia
- Bălți, Moldova
- Elbląg, Poland
- Karlskoga, Sweden
- Xiamen, China
