= Neighbourhoods of Narva =

Areas of Narva, Estonia

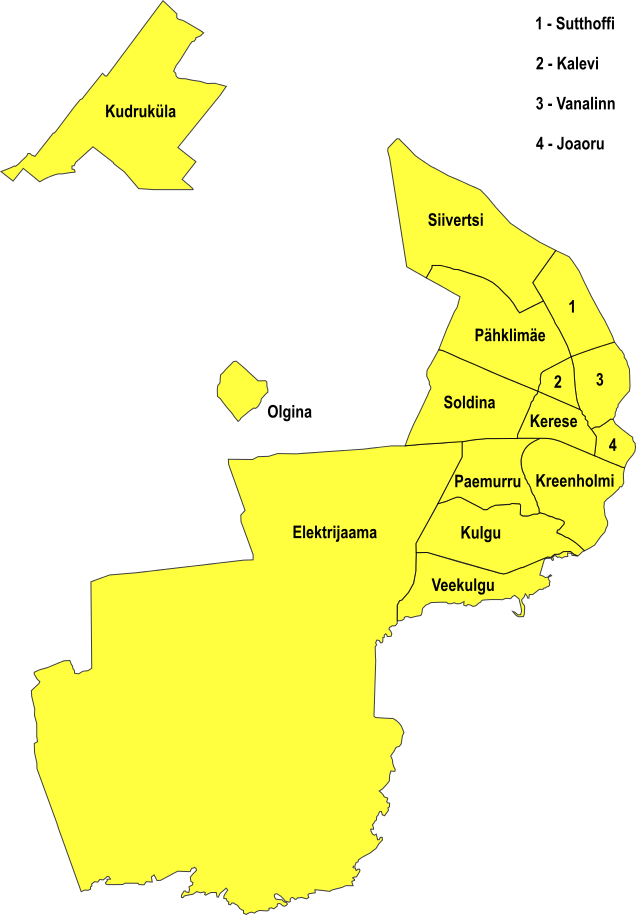
Neighbourhoods of Narva

Narva, Estonia is officially divided into 15 neighbourhoods which carry no administrative purpose.

Their names and borders are defined as follows: Elektrijaama, Joaoru, Kalevi, Kerese, Kreenholmi, Kudruküla, Kulgu, Olgina, Paemurru, Pähklimäe, Siivertsi, Soldina, Sutthoffi, Vanalinn, and Veekulgu.

== Elektrijaama ==
The Elektrijaama (lit. 'Power Plant') district is the biggest neighbourhood of Narva that is centred around the city's electric generation facilities. In 1950 the Soviets built a hydroelectric dam across the Narva river at Elektrijaama that also doubled as a bridge to Ivangorod, just a few dozen metres downstream, as well as two oil-shale power plants, Balti & Eesti in 1966 and 1973 respectively. The construction of the dam was supposed to see the Narva river redirected, however, that never happened, and a reservoir was instead created, swallowing up large swaths of forested territory to the south of the city.

The district not only provided power for Narva, but also a good portion of the rest of Estonia, and also provided heating for homes. The district is also home to the Narva industrial park and is home to many large ash fields from the fly ash produced by the power plants, leaving it largely unsuitable for residential development. After independence Estonia has retained Elektrijaama as the city's new Industrial centre, with the power plants still being the electric backbone of Ida-Viru County, while also diversifying the district, opening and supporting the Narva Museum within its boundaries.

=== Lost villages ===
Due to the construction of the hydroelectric dam, and the failure of Soviet authorities to divert the river, several preexisting villages where consumed by the Narva Reservoir on both the Russian and Estonian sides of the border. These included: Vääska, a village on the Estonian side that was subject to heavy fighting during both the Estonian War of Independence and World War II and Kulgu that was cleared to make way for the Elektrijaama power plants. The Russian side meanwhile lost 7 villages, many of them ethnically Finnic including: Suur-Žerdjanka, Ust-Žerdjanka, Kriuša, Nizõ, Dolgaja Niva, Ust-Tšernovo and Uznovo. These were mostly small fishing villages that also relied on plot farming and petty trade. All of them had belonged to Estonia and were ceded to the Russian SFSR in 1945.

== Kerese ==
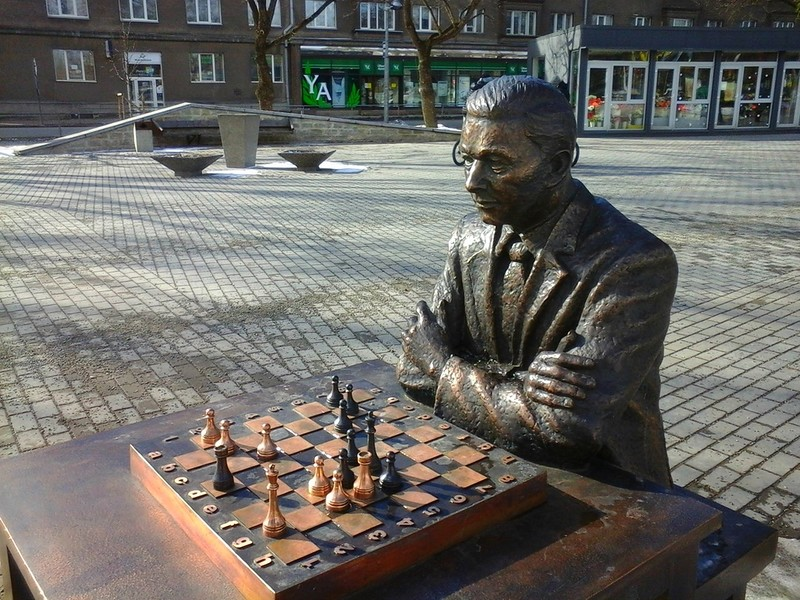
Monument of Paul Keres, the namesake of Kerese, in one of the district's parks

Named after Estonian national hero and chess grandmaster Paul Keres, the District sits south of Paul Keres Street which acts as a dividing line between the new and old city, with the old city to the north, and the new city to the south. The district has a notably high concentration of Russians and Russian language gymnasiums acting as a cultural and commercial hub for Narva's Russian Estonians with several malls and public transportation connecting it to residential districts. The district is also home to a campus of the Estonian Academy of Security Sciences which was the third modern building in Narva designed from an architecture competition.

The district has been at the forefront of Estonia's effort to integrate its Russian population into speaking Estonian and participating in the Estonian, rather than the Russian, economy, as well as removing the casus belli Russia cited during its invasion of Ukraine, of protecting Russian citizens, from being relevant in Estonia. Kerese district is home to the headquarters of the Integration Foundation (Estonian: Integratsiooni Sihtasutus), whose mission statement is to integrate the Russian population of Estonia into Estonian life and has been supporting the replacement of Russian as the first language in public schools in Narva with Estonian.

== Kreenholmi ==
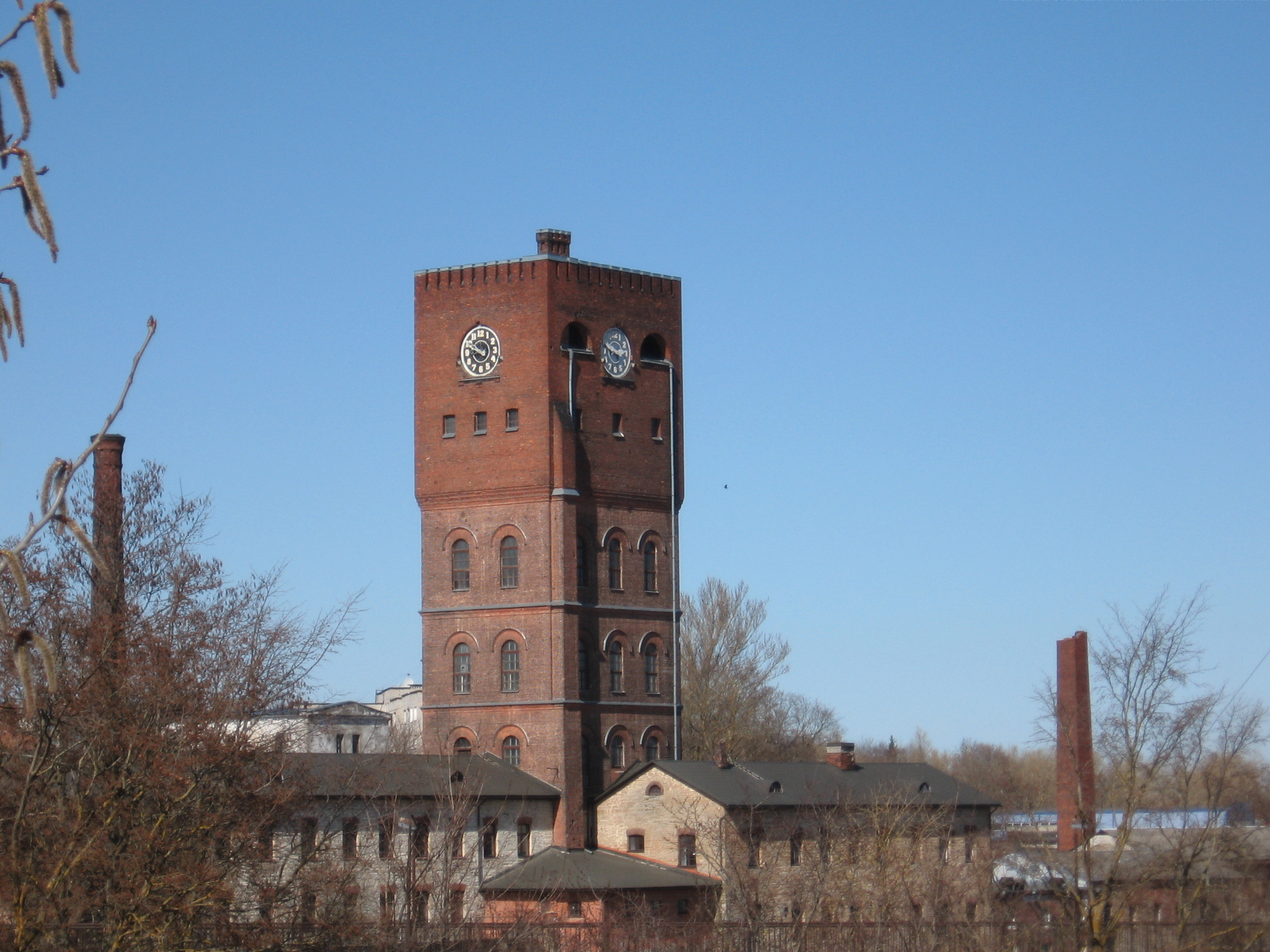
Clock tower built into a water tower at the Kreenholm mill

Named after and centred around Kreenholm island in the Narva River, Kreenholmi is home to powerful waterfalls and rapids, which made the site lucrative for mills. Principle among which was the Kreenholm Manufacturing Company, which was constructed by Baron Johann Ludwig von Knoop between 1856 and 1857 and 1884 the complex had four textile mills. The complex was the largest factory in the Russian Empire accounting for 10% of the entire Empire's textile production. The factory would see a major decline in productivity with the establishment of an Independent Estonia, with employment dropping from 10,400 right before World War I to 1,453 in 1921. Kreenholmi is known for its dense network of industrial architecture developed around the factory which was built with a distinctive English bond using red brick. The district acted as the city's Industrial centre.

World War II severely limited the industrial capacity of the Kreenholmi district and Narva as a whole. In 1940, with the establishment of the Estonian Soviet Socialist Republic, the Kreenholm Manufacturing Company, which employed 2,172 employees, was nationalized, however, was also cut off from access to European markets and as such was subjected to Soviet fabric shortages which were common in the 1940s, resulting in a total loss of productivity. It would not be until German occupation in 1941 when the factory was reopened with between 1,500 and 1,600 Estonians working in the factory for the Germans. Fighting during the Battle of Narva rendered the factory complex inoperable with repair costs expected to be 250 million roubles. However, one of the first edicts passed by the Central Committee of the Communist Party of Estonia was to prioritize the repair and reopening of the Kreenholm mill. By 1955 the mill had 9,360 employees producing 15,814 tonnes of yarn and 98,014 metres of fabrics per year. The Soviets greatly extended the mill, opening a second planet as well as a finishing mill with several employees receiving national recognition, including; Taisia Marchenko, who was awarded the Order of Lenin and Hero of Socialist Labour and would go on to be elected to the 5th and 6th Supreme Soviets. In 1985 the Council of Ministers of the USSR passed the authority of the Kreenholm plant to the Estonian SSR.

When Estonia regained independence in 1991 during the Collapse of the Soviet Union, the Kreenholm Manufacturing Company became the state run Kreenholm Manufacturing State Enterprise in 1992. The facility produced bed linen, tablecloths, napkins, curtains, terrycloth towels, and bathrobes which were exported to America, Germany, France, Sweden, Finland, and Norway. However, by 1994, Kreenholm would be privatized and would be acquired by the Swedish firm Borås Wäfveri AB in 1995. Borås Wäfveri turned the individual aspects of the factory complex into independent joint-stock companies. Production would peak in 2000 with sales surpassing 1,240 million Estonian kroons, making it the seventh most productive company in Estonia for that year. However, due to cheap labour from Asia due to globalization, the Kreenholm plant would struggle to meet its employment capacity and on 17 June 2008 the mill was shuttered. Shortly after the industrial plant was purchased by a private investor to turn into the "Manufacture Cultural Quarter."

The district is also home to the Kreenholmi Stadium, home of the JK Narva Trans which compete in the top flight of the Estonian football league system.

== Kudruküla ==
One of Narva's two exclaves, the neighbourhood is 5.6 km^{2} and named after the Kudruküla stream which flows through it, a tributary of the Narva river. The neighbouring Kudruküla village also shares this name. The area that would become Kudruküla was set aside in the 1950s for Dachas, or summer cottage retreats, for the wealthy and politically connected in Narva during the Estonian Soviet Socialist Republic. Kudruküla has always been governed directly from Narva and was intentionally designed as an exclave to offer more escapism for its residents. As with most other Soviet Dachas, most of the residents of Kudruküla participated in gardening and would sell their produce in one of Narvas 52 gardening cooperatives. The plans for these cottage allotments were never finalized before the collapse of the Soviet Union and were loosely interpreted by residents. During land reform from 1992 to 2001 the Dachas were given defined borders and then privatized. From 5–7 August 2021, Kudruküla hosted the fourth annual Station Narva music festival, seeing some 3,000 visitors come to the neighbourhood and learn about Dacha life.

=== Riigi ===
From 1808 to 1944 the area which would become Kudruküla was the village of Riigi (also known as Riigiküla or by its German name Wasahof), established as a Manor, which, by the end of the 17th century was part of the Kudruküla Manor, a Town Fief of Narva. In 1828 a Russian German merchant from Saint Petersburg established a sugar factory in Riigi, however, the factory would be shut down just decades later due to its pollution of the Tõrvajõgi river and the area remained sparsely populated by sustenance fishers for almost a century. During the Estonian War of Independence, Riigi was the site of several battles between Estonian and Soviet forces. In 1922 Riigi had 15 households and 94 inhabitants and a women's society and a fire station and public school were built. A monument consisting of a stone Cross of Liberty was made in 1935, however, would be destroyed by Soviet forces in 1941. Riigi during this time was also the site of the densest stretch of field fortifications constructed by Estonia on its border with the Soviet Union, which would also be destroyed by Soviet forces in 1940. Riigi would be completely destroyed during the Battle of Narva during World War II. None of the original structures survived the fighting, with the remains of trenches and shrapnel in the immediate surroundings still persisting.
