= Narva (disambiguation) =

Narva is the third largest city in Estonia.

Narva may also refer to:

- Narva (river), on the Estonia-Russia border
  - Narva Reservoir
  - Narva Falls
- Narva River, Primorsky Krai, a river in Primorsky Krai, Russia which flows into Amur Bay
- Narva Airfield
- Narva Bay
- Narva Bay, Primorsky Krai, a bay in Primorsky Krai, Russia within the Amur Bay
- Narva culture, an archaeological culture
- Narva castle
- Narva Gate
- Narva highway
- Narva, Primorsky Krai, Russia
- Narva PSK, ice hockey team in Narva, Estonia
- Narva, Narayanpet district, a mandal in Telangana
- Narva, Ontario, a municipality in Ontario, Canada
- SS Narva, a British cargo ship in service 1946–1957

== Surname ==
- Mai Narva (born 1999), Estonian chess player
- Regina Narva (born 1970), Estonian chess player
- Triin Narva (born 1994), Estonian chess player

== See also ==
- Narew (disambiguation)
