= Astrid Reinla =

Estonian writer (1948–1995)

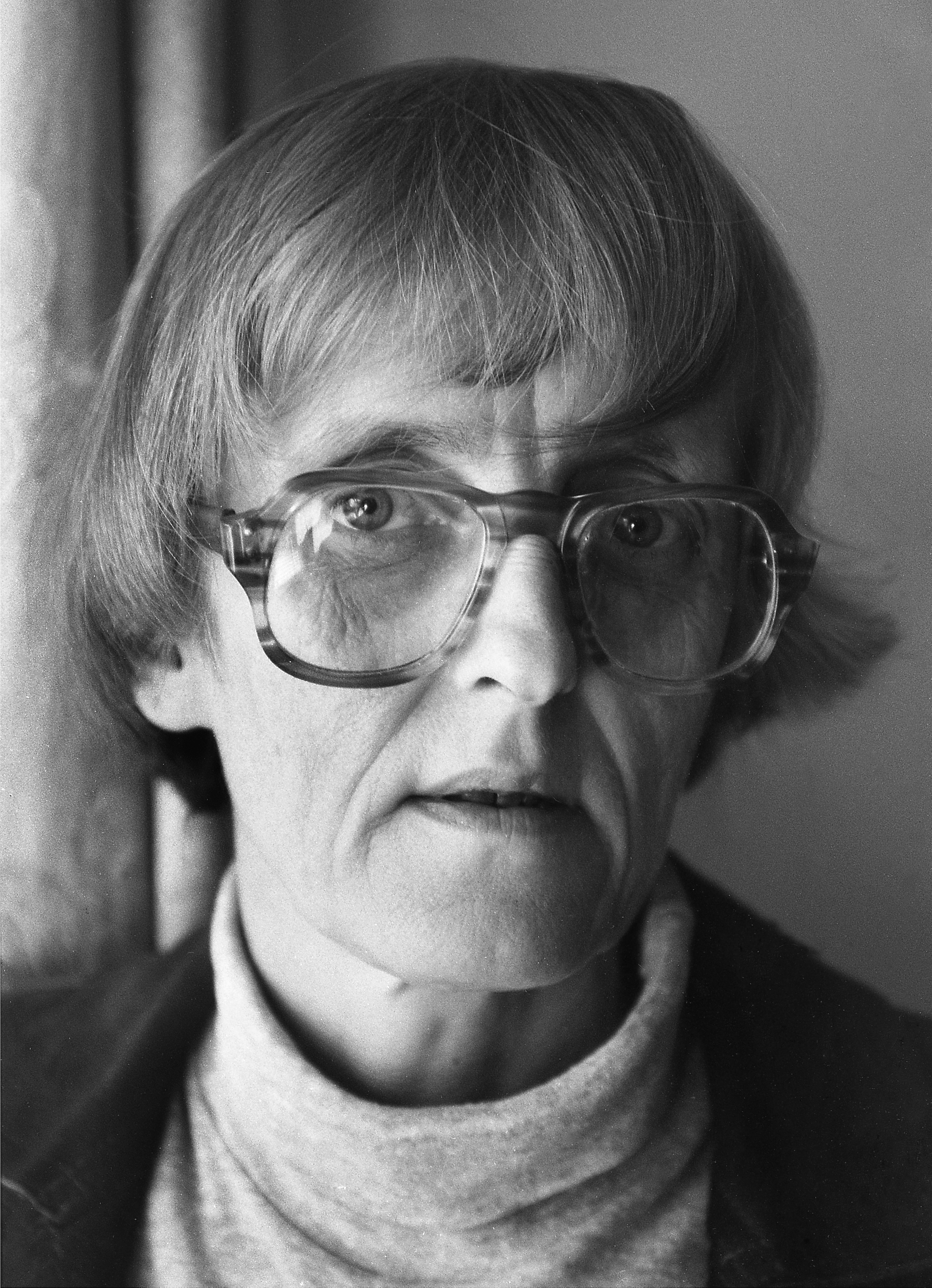
- Born: 1 March 1948; Tallinn, then part of Estonian SSR, Soviet Union
- Died: 1 January 1995 (aged 46); Tallinn, Estonia
- Education: University of Tartu
- Father: Oskar Kuningas

Astrid Reinla (born Astrid Kuningas; 1 March 1948, in Tallinn – 1 January 1995, in Tallinn) was an Estonian writer.

Reinla was born in Tallinn. Her father was literary scholar, literary and theatre critic, cultural historian and translator Oskar Kuningas. Her older sister was chess player and journalist Merike Rõtova and her first cousin was actress Helle Kuningas.

In 1974, she graduated from the University of Tartu with a degree in Estonian philology. From 1966 until 1969 she worked as a bibliographer at Estonian National Library. From 1974 until 1976, she worked as a language editor at Eesti Raamat, and from 1976 until 1979, at the journal Horisont. Since 1979, she was a freelance writer.

Besides books she wrote also worked as a screenwriter for the television programs, including the Eesti Televisioon drama series Õnne 13.

Reinla was married to writer and translator Boris Kabur.

== Biography ==
She studied at Tallinn secondary schools no. 29 (1955–1961) and 7 (1961–1966) and at Tartu State University (1969–1974) from where she graduated as an Estonian philologist.

Reinla's first piece of writing was published in a periodical in 1969. The most fertile creative period in her less than 50 years of life fell into the 1980s when she published collections of both poetry and short stories but also children's books and plays. The latter include, e.g., Naeris naeris (‘The Turnip Laughed’, 1984), which was staged at the Estonian Puppet Theatre, and Koduabiline (‘Domestic Helper’, 1986) which was staged at the Ugala Theatre.

Although Reinla's creation had an essential role in her time, and critic Aivar Kull has called her “a balancing, reconciling force that mitigated tensions in that time's cultural life”, today she is best known as a children's writer. Several generations have grown up with her mythological character Pätu (1988) whom no one has seen, but who can be made responsible for any mischief that has happened at home. In 1990, the book was screened as a television play; an audio cassette with Pätu's songs was also released. The painfully realistic story about the forsaken cat Teofrastus (1985), which reflects the value judgements and sore points of that time's society, may have inspired several younger writers’ children's books about cats and given a new dimension to the local identity of the Mustamäe district in Tallinn and the South Estonian village Peedu. Teofrastus was made into a puppet film as late as in 2018, which proves the strong impact the book had on children when was published, and how it continues to live on in their memories. Teofrastus has been translated into German and English (both 1989).

Many Estonians remember Reinla as the author of the idea and the first scriptwriter of the popular television series Õnne 13 (Meie elu lood) (‘13 Õnne Street (The Stories of Our Life)’). Although the scriptwriters of the series initiated by her in 1993 have changed for several times, being always well-known Estonian writers, the series is still popular and has continued uninterruptedly for several decades. In 1995, Reinla posthumously received the Literature Endowment Annual Award for Õnne 13.

Reinla translated various works into Estonian, including the collection of science-fiction stories by the Russian writer Andrei Balabukha Eelkäijad (Forerunners, 1978), Ella Fonyakova's story for young adults Tolle talve leib (‘The Bread of That Winter’, 1979), Teekond teise ilma ehk suur palverännak (‘Journey into the Other World or Great Pilgrimage’, 1980) by the Tajik writer Fazlidin Mukhamadiev and Helen Keller's novel Minu elu lugu (‘The Story of My Life’, 1995).

== Works ==
- 1982: collection of short stories "Inimestega"
- 1985: children's book "Teofrastus"
- 1987: collection of short stories "Plekk-katus"
- 1988: children's book "Pätu"
- 1989: children's book "Miikael"
- 1994: children's book "Lumeelevant. Krooksjalad"
