= Narva River Landscape Conservation Area =

Protected area in Estonia

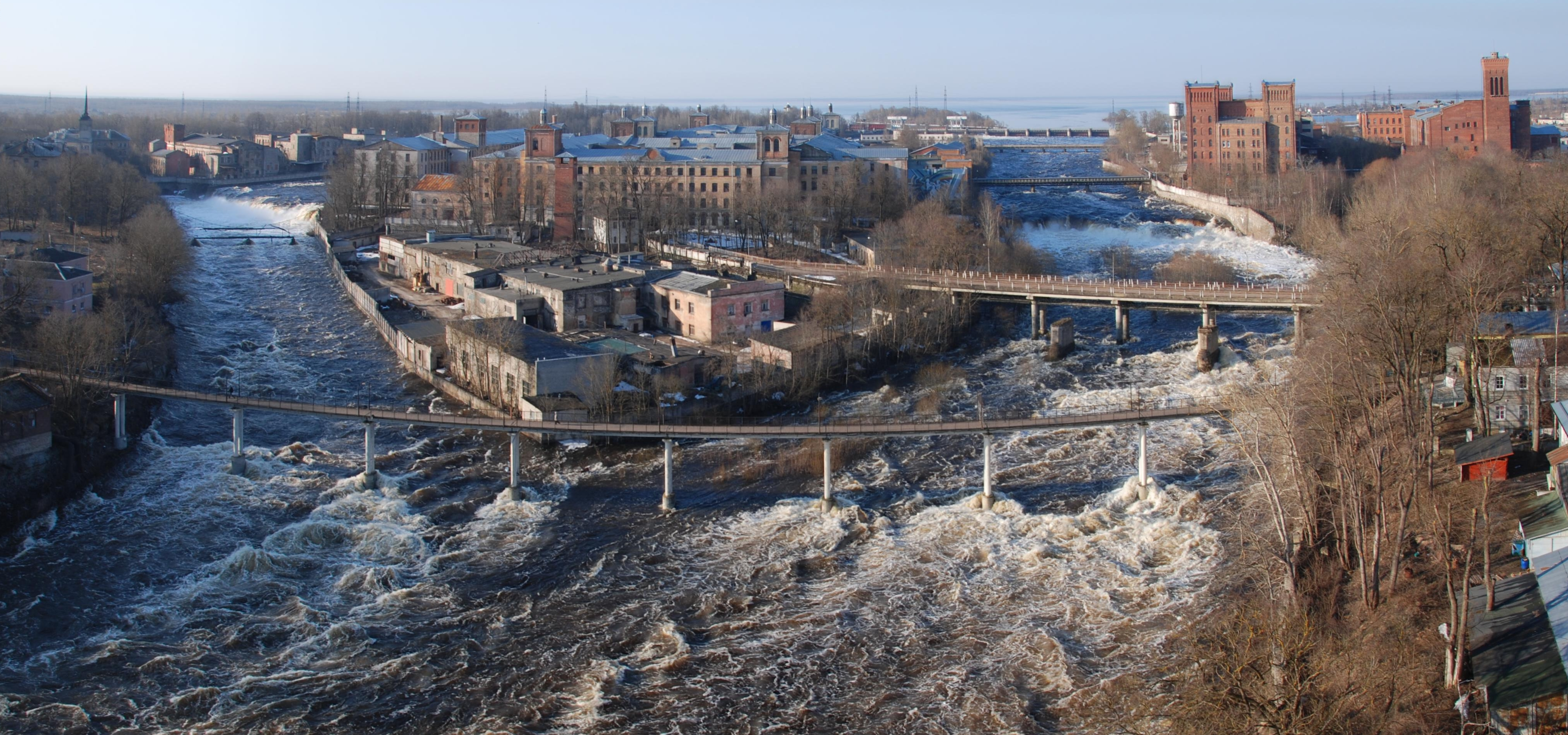

- Location within Estonia
- Location: Estonia
- Coordinates: 59°21′20″N 28°11′30″E
- Area: 14 ha (35 acres)
- Established: (1959) 2010

Narva River Landscape Conservation Area is a nature park is located in Ida-Viru County, Estonia.

The area of the nature park is 14 ha.

The protected area was founded in (1959) 2010 to protect the bed and banks of Narva River.
