= Kreenholm Manufacturing Company =

Textile manufacturing company based in Estonia

Coordinates: 59°21′26″N 28°11′27″E

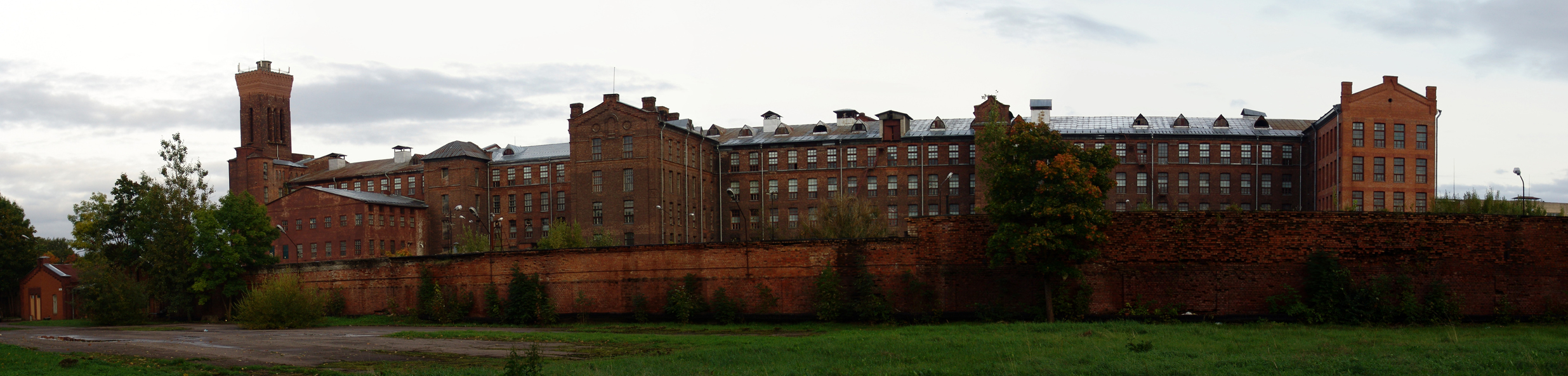
- Kreenholm Manufacturing Company, 2009
- Native name: Kreenholmi Manufaktuur
- Industry: Textile
- Founder: Ludwig Knoop
- Defunct: 2010
- Fate: bankruptcy, purchased by Swedish company Prod i Ronneby AB
- Headquarters: Narva, Estonia
- Products: textile products
- Website: krenholm.ee

The Kreenholm Manufacturing Company (historical alternate spelling: Krenholm; Estonian: Kreenholmi Manufaktuur; German: Krähnholm Manufaktur; Russian: Кренгольмская мануфактура) was a textile manufacturing company located on the river island of Kreenholm in the city of Narva, Estonia, near the border with Russia. It is situated along the banks of the Narva river, by the large Narva Falls, 16 kilometres (9.9 mi) from the Baltic Sea. It was founded by Ludwig Knoop in 1857, a cotton merchant from Bremen, Germany. At one point, the company's cotton spinning and manufacturing mills were the largest in the world; and Kreenholm was considered in its time to be the most important mill of the former Russian Empire, owning 32,000 acres of land and employing 12,000 people.

In 1872, the Kreenholm factory was the site of the first labour strike in the history of Estonia, as well as one of the earliest labour strikes in all of the then Russian Empire. After the 1940 Soviet invasion and occupation of Estonia, the company's property was nationalised. Kreenholm's assets were privatised again in 1994, three years after Estonia had regained independence. The new company went bankrupt in 2010, and continued limited operations after purchase by the next set of owners (Kreenholmi Manufaktuur OÜ).

== History ==
The island that the factory would come to be situated on was located between two waterfalls on the Narva (Narova) River overlooking the city of Narva (Narwa). The area was part of Sweden until being captured by the Tsardom of Russia (Muscovy) in 1704, during the 1700–1721 Great Northern War. Only one small sawmill was located on the island throughout the 18th century as a wealthy local German merchant family owned the island and used it as a vacation retreat. A German merchant made an unsuccessful attempt to start a wool manufacturing business on the island during the 1820s; it was dissolved in 1831.

=== Mid-19th century and the founding Kreenholm ===
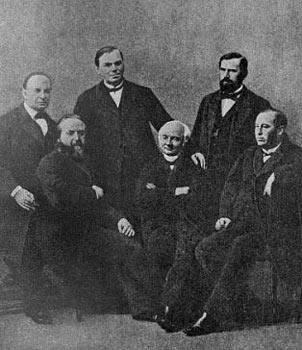
The founders of the Kreenholm Manufacturing Company (1857). Standing, from the left: Ernst Kolbe, brothers Aleksey Khludov and Gerasim Khludov. Sitting, from the left: Kuzma Soldatyonkov, Baron Ludwig Knoop, and Richard Barlow. (Illustration from the Album "Krenholm Manufacture. Historic Description, composed on the Occasion of the Fiftieth Anniversary of its Existence"; St. Petersburg, 1907.)

In 1856, a pioneer of the cotton industry, Ludwig Knoop, purchased the island of Kreenholm for 50,000 roubles from the heirs of a local merchant Sutthoff. The manufacturing company was founded a year later in 1857 by Knoop, along with initial investors Kuzma Soldatyonkov, Aleksey Khludov, Gerasim Khludov, Richard Barlow, and Ernst Kolbe. It was listed as a joint stock operation initially made up of 400 shares at 5,000 roubles each, valuing the company at 2 million roubles. The charter was approved by Tsar Alexander II on July 23, 1857. Knoop was the director general of the company until his death in 1894, Johann Prowe succeeded him in this position.

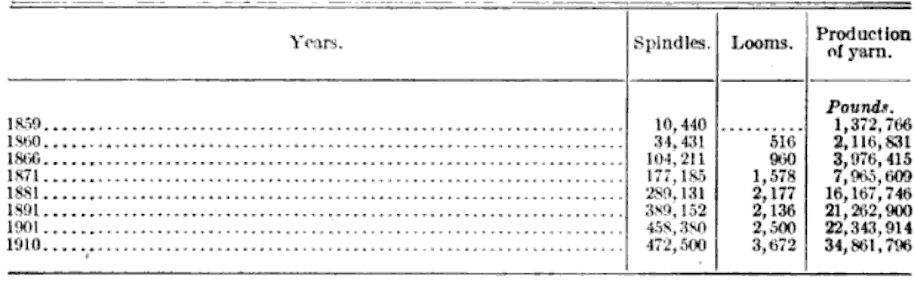
Table showing the production growth of the factory over its first 50 years, in terms of output

A number of prominent guests attended the ceremonial laying of the cornerstone on April 30, 1857. The original factory layout was made up of four large buildings but consisting of two factories. A "left" and "right" spinning building (called korpus) that together made up the spinning factory, along with a weaving factory designed with the same concept. The left korpus of the spinning factory was the first to be completed in the fall of 1857 and began operating in the fall of 1858, it would go on to be known as the "Old Half" or "Old Wing". The other three buildings were constructed in the following years with most of the work completed around 1862, although a continuously growing workforce at the factory led to housing expansion for workers throughout the 1860s. Along with the factories and dormitories, other buildings constructed during these years included: an apartment house for office workers, a house for foreman and supervisors, a small school building, a small infirmary, and a pharmacy.

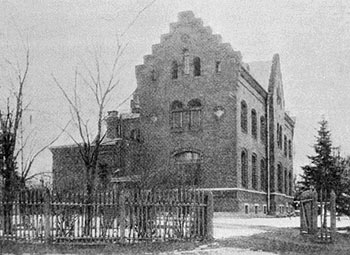
The house built for the company director

The factories were built with limestone from a local quarry; all the structures for workers were built with logs. As the Baltic Sea is only about 16 km away, large cotton warehouses were erected in the harbour at the mouth of the river where cotton, imported directly from the United States or Liverpool, was stored and brought up the river to the mill as needed. A new spinnery was built on the island in 1870, and the company bought the adjacent Georgiyevsky Island in 1872 and built another mill there in 1899. The company also purchased Joala Manor and converted it into a mill in 1884, expanding it in 1890. The complex initially manufactured calico and received its raw materials from the Americas, Egypt, and India. The introduction of the St. Petersburg–Tallinn (Reval) railroad opened up Central Asian markets. In 1893 it contained 340,000 spindles, 22,000 looms, and employed 7,000 people. Professor Gerhart von Schulze-Gävernitz visited the mills in the 1890s stating that "the whole place is a bit of England on Russian ground."

The carding and spinning machinery was from the firm of Platt Brothers & Co Ltd, in Oldham, England. Some of the looms were English, but most of them were made by the firm in its foundry and machine works, which were an adjunct of the mill. Riving power included 11 water turbines with a combined horsepower of 8,550, and supplementary steam engines of 700 horsepower were employed. Seventy per cent of the spindles were used in making yarns for sale principally among weavers in the St. Petersburg and Moscow textile districts. A specialty of the mill was 90s ply yarn, made from Egyptian yarn, for the rubber-tire manufacturers. The range of yarns produced was wide, running from 3s to 90s, and about 330,000 of the spindles were mules. The woven textile consisted mainly of print cloth in various types of construction and sateens, both woven from 34s warp and 38s weft. Practically all the goods were shipped to a factory in Moscow during this time.

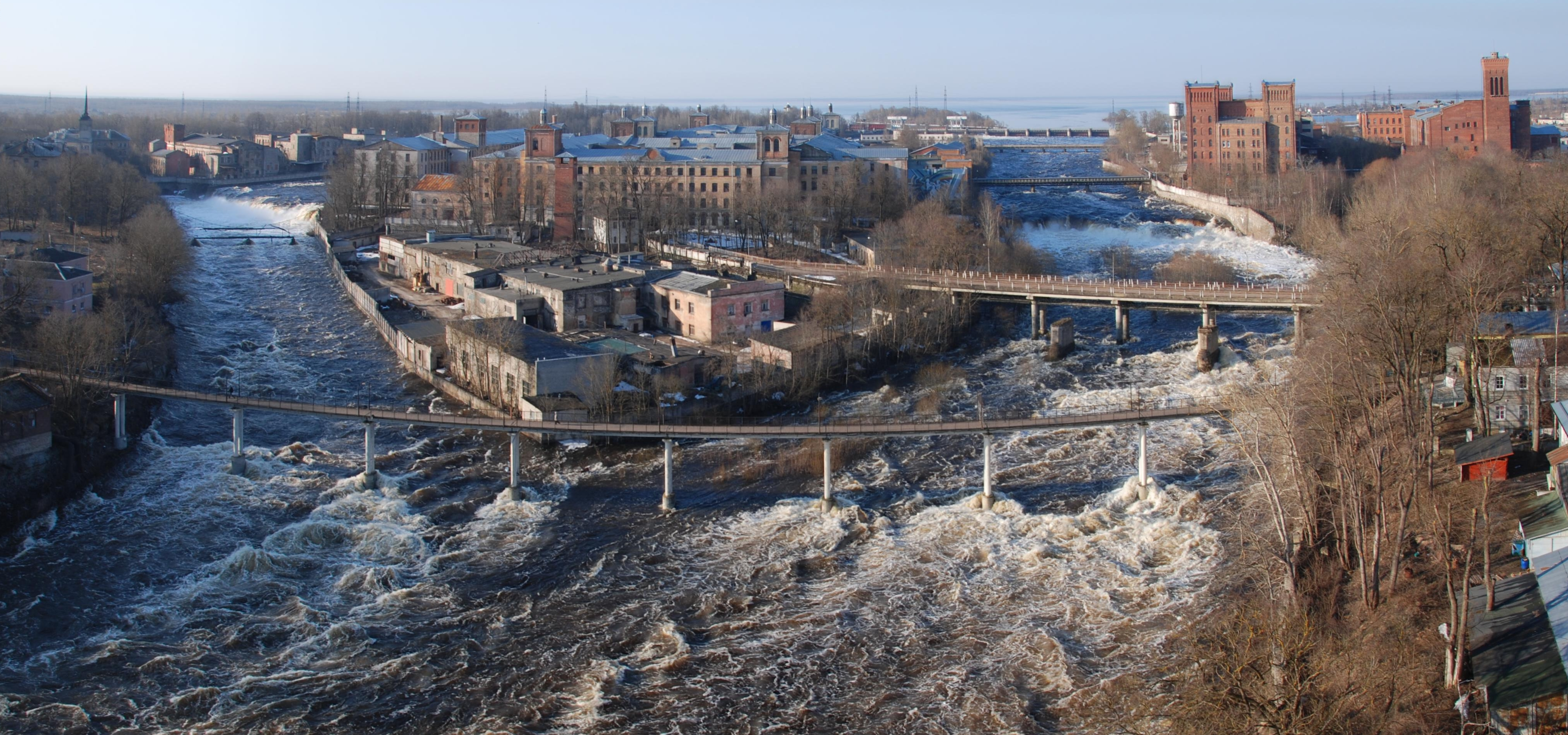
Overview of the island and facilities

The managers and assistant managers of the mills were mainly Englishmen, such as James Charnock. Others were Germans and Russians. The majority of the labourers were Estonians, but the initially smaller share of Russian workers would increase over time. The company provided a hospital, schooling for 1,200 children, a Lutheran church (for the Estonians and Germans), and a Russian Orthodox church (built at a cost of $250,000). Employees lived at the mill paying nominal rent. The owners provided a monthly allowance and board for workers who had spent longer than 30 years at the factory.

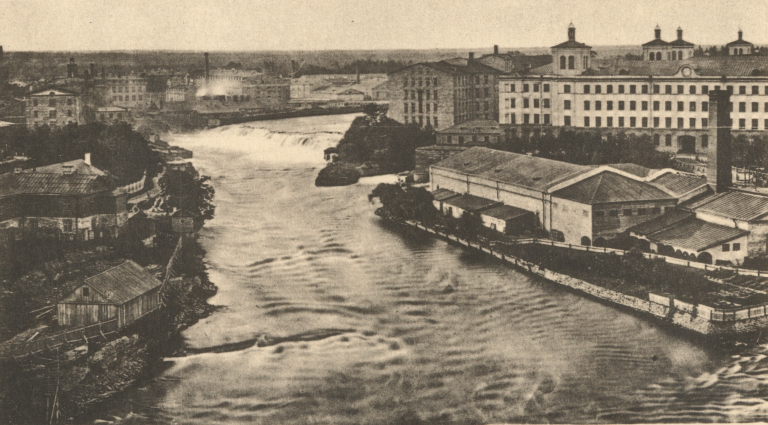
Narva River, Narva falls, and the Kreenholm Manufacturing Company buildings, 1886.

=== The strike of 1872 ===
There was a cholera outbreak within the factory that started spreading amongst workers on 21 July 1872. The provincial medical inspector Dr. Johann-Eduard von Falk investigated the event and dated the timeline of the outbreak from 21 July to 21 September. He eventually reported 503 infections and 334 deaths at the factory, although these continuously revised estimates were challenged by both workers and outside contemporaries who though the true numbers were much higher. Amidst harsh working and living conditions, employees at the factory placed blame on the factory administration for being unable to respond to the rampant disease. On 9 August, masons who were working at the factory during this time requested back pay and permission to leave the factory until the disease subsided but were denied by management.

Upon denial of their initial requests on the same day, a group of 120 masons walked to the town of Narva to try and get help from the provisional government. Their meeting with the head of the regional office of Imperial Gendarmes was unsuccessful and the masons returned to the island that night. Once returning the factory, hundreds of masons began to solemnly march around the factory grounds in protest. The next day Major Nikolai Andreianov, the head of the regional office the masons had appealed to in Narva, received orders to assure better precautions against the epidemic were put in place at the factory and to dismiss any of the masons who still complained. Only 190 out of 450 of the mason artel members stayed at the factory, but less than a week later the cases of cholera peaked and those who deserted began to return to the factory. After this event the masons did not participate in anymore of the labor disputes.

During the workday of 14 August 1872, just a few days after the masons demonstration, an estimated 500 out of 900 weavers at the factories walked out from their looms to gather at the factory directors office to demand better working conditions. This was likely initiated from the windows in the factory being left open for hygienic reasons, since workers were cold and wanted to close them. Ernst Kolbe, the director at the time and a major shareholder of the factory, asked for help from the gendarme office in Narva once the workers began demanding more than just for the windows to be closed. Major Andreianov arrived with three additional officers to oversee negotiations between Kolbe and ten weavers self selected from the workers. After making their demands, Kolbe claimed that the owners would need to come to the factory from Moscow in order to allow these changes, so the workers agreed to wait and continue working under their current conditions. Throughout the week that they waited more workers from the factory joined the collective of those asking for change, with many of these workers notably being spinners who were not originally part of the crowd on 14 August. On 21 August the collective of workers negotiated their revised demands with two owners from Moscow, including the original and chief investor Ludwig Knoop, with the provincial governor present to intermediate. Over the course of the day some of the concessions were awarded to workers, including a slightly shorter workday and increased pay.

On 9 September 1872, a counter-petition was brought forward and signed by 24 workers who, likely in tandem with management, wanted for the old ways of Kreenholm to be restored. A group of workers was made aware of this in the factory tavern and marched towards the house of a factory manager to protest. The crowd was peacefully dispersed but the workers sent representatives to the gendarme office in Narva to appeal to the government about the counter revisions. A council with the governor was denied, although Andreianov suggested they take their concerns to the chief of police for the time being, whom the workers agreed to wait for. Later in the day, having heard of the previous nights disturbances from the perspective of the factory managers, the district chief of police Hakenrichter Girard arrested 6 delegates from the workers. They were sentenced to one week in the Narva prison for their actions the previous night.

The following morning at the factory some more workers were arrested. Having been informed about what had happened the previous day, 200 weavers left their stations to demand the release of their coworkers. The workers armed themselves with blunt objects and returned in the afternoon to surround the office that the managers and police were in, simultaneously blocking off the bridge connecting the island to its western shore. Another mob of workers, estimated to be a few hundred strong, marched to Narva to demand the release of the imprisoned workers from the prison. The military was called in by local authorities and factory management. 220 soldiers arrived at nightfall and dispersed the crowd, maintaining order at the factory throughout the night. The following morning skirmishes continued between workers and soldiers as large contingents of workers still refused to work and tried to prevent their compliant contemporaries from being able to access the factory. By noon those who had reported to work were sent home by management and the factory was effectively closed for the day. Unable to contain the now violent actions of the rebellious workers, the provincial governor and an entire imperial regiment were called in to restore order. They arrived by 6 pm and were able to put down all of the workers activities. This was the first major industrial strike in Estonia.

The following morning there was a government inquiry into what had occurred over the previous two days. Soldiers continued to arrest workers who had been instigators through Friday, 15 September 1872. Upon withdrawal of the military troops at the end of the week, the governor gave orders to reorient the local police and security organisations to better respond to issues at the factory, usurping the factory police chief and essentially dissolving its force. The district mangericht held a special session from 18 September to 28 September 1872 in order to review the criminal actions of the strike, 29 workers were indicted. Disputes between workers and management persisted throughout September and October so a state sponsored commission was enacted on 17 October. They reviewed the current situation at the factory and submitted a report on November 15. The final mandates were that Kreenholm was subject to the laws of the land (nullifying a previous statute incorporated at the factory), a permanent police force appointed by the governor would be assigned to the factory, and the old system for worker fines would be replaced by a newer one, "fairer" to workers. Only some of these measures were actually implemented at the factory as government oversight faded.

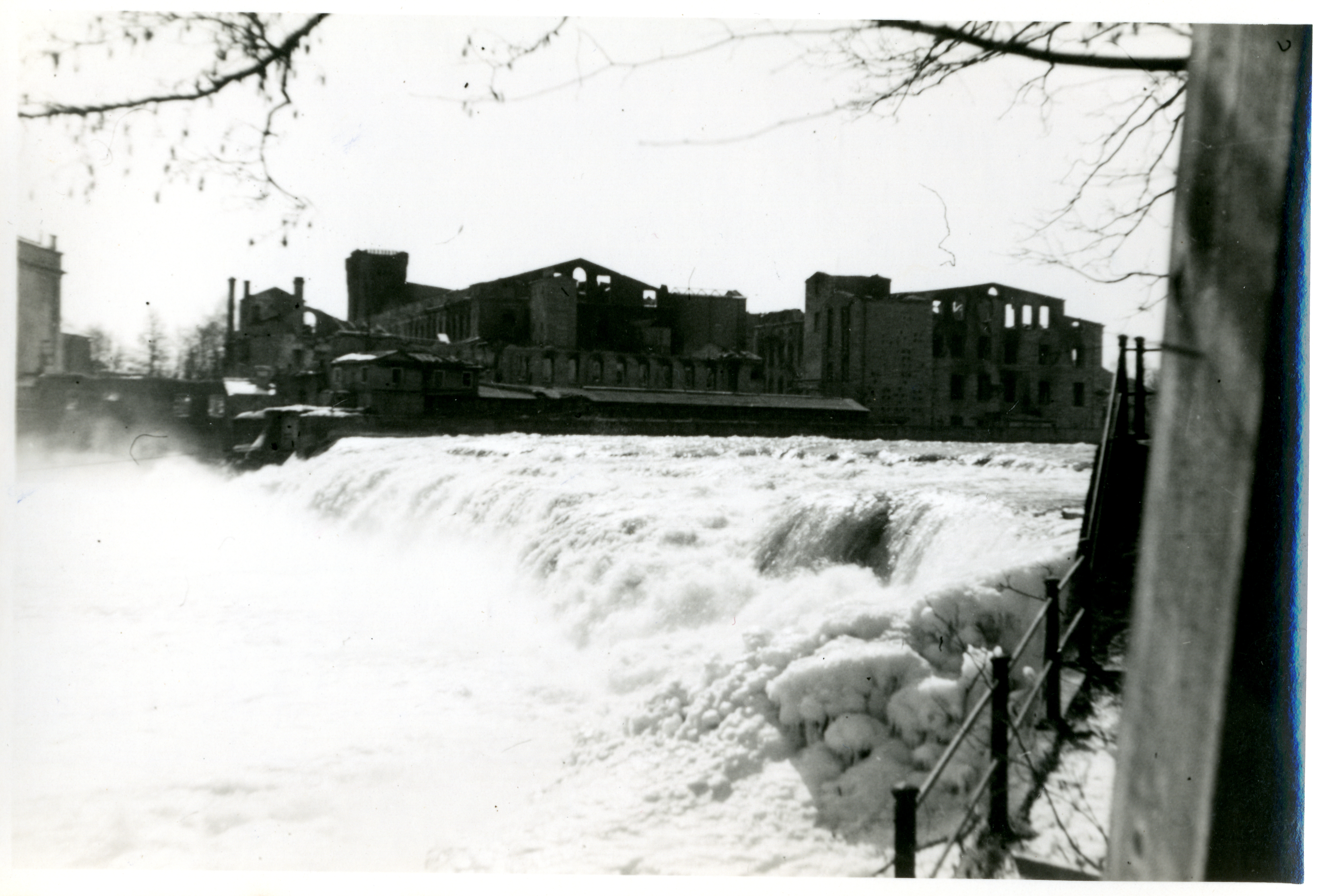
The 27-foot Narva Falls that used to power much of the factory

Ten years later, in 1882, a second workers' strike took place at the factory. A collective of spinners walked out to confront management about grievances related to compensation and factory life once again; a lockout ensued with the strike and three battalions were called to Kreenholm as the government anticipated disorders to start again. The military were present for a week as the strike continued, although small groups of workers began to return to the factory in the meantime. Some workers who had taken violent action were arrested, whereas the factory returned to normal operation in the following week.

=== 20th century ===
Knoop's sons Theodor and Andreas took over the factory as directors when Johann Prowe died in 1901. Kreenholm dominated the local economy in Narva during this time. In 1903 the company produced satin, lustrine, muslin, and batiste. The wages paid in 1910 amounted to $1,370,000. In that year, 74,660 bales of cotton were used, from which 34,861,796 pounds of yarn and 159,994 pieces of cloth (average 45 yards each) were used. Before World War I, this mill employed 10,400 people and manufactured 17,500 thousand tonnes of yarn and 75 million meters of fabric annually, which amounted to roughly 10% of the cotton cloth production in the empire. The valuation of the company during this time was now around 12 million silver roubles and its assets totaled 25 billion roubles. It was one of the largest textile manufacturers in the world.

Nearing the end of the First World War in 1918 the German army occupied Narva. The factory produced bandages and fabrics for the German war effort while it was occupied. During their withdrawal in the same year, the German army took Kreenholm's cotton supply with them, leaving the company without any raw materials to manufacture with after the war ended.

As Estonia became an independent country in 1918, it led to the loss of access to the now Soviet Russian markets. In 1921 there were only 1,453 employees and the Estonian cotton industry experienced a crisis. Although the mill was forced to reduce its workforce and decrease the overall production, the company was soon able to enter into other foreign markets and enjoyed commercial success in the independent Republic of Estonia during the 1920s and 1930s. In 1939, the factory had 2,736 employees. As during World War II the Soviet Union invaded and occupied Estonia in 1940, the new Soviet Stalinist regime nationalised the Kreenholm facilities along with all other industries in the occupied country.

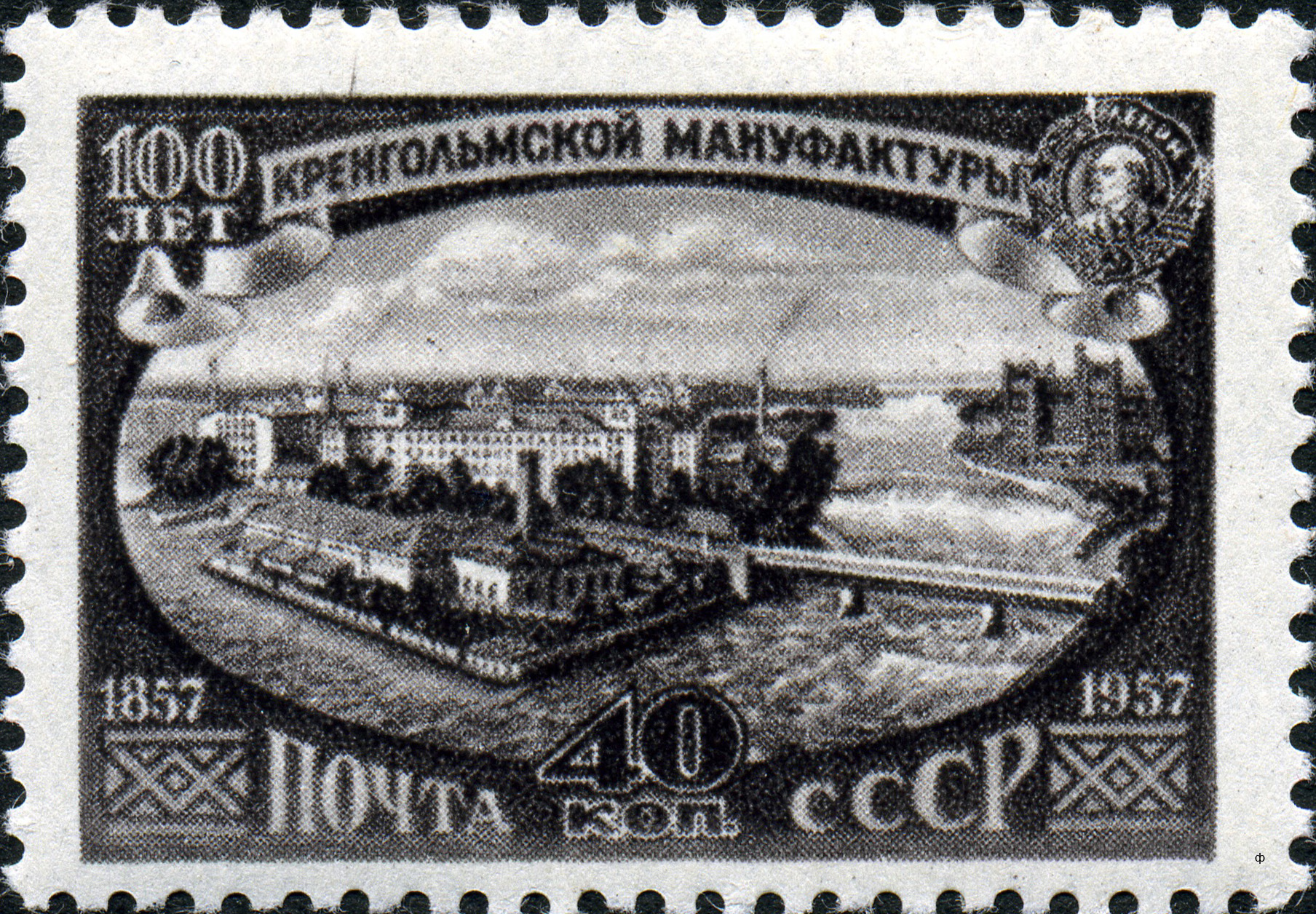
100 years Krenholm manufacture. Post of USSR, 1957.

The first order to nationalise Kreenholm was made by the Stalinist authorities on 29 July 1940. Konstantin Kosko was nominated as the first director of the factory under the new regime. During the 1940–1941 Soviet occupation of Estonia, the factory lost access to the European markets, but the Soviet regime was able to increase the production in order to fulfill its own internal market's fabric needs. The Nazi German army captured Narva on 18 August 1941, and would go on to use it to supply the Nazi German war effort. When the Soviet Army recaptured Narva on 26 July 1944, the city had been destroyed, the mill had become inoperable and damages caused to it were worth up to an estimated 250 million Soviet roubles. Nevertheless, the Stalinist authorities decided to restore the factory "in order to serve the Soviet Union".

During the 1944–1991 Soviet occupation of Estonia, the Kreenholm factory was turned into a large "socialist industrial enterprise" which was in effect driven by commands of the Soviet planned economy instead of any pursuit of profits. From 1945 to 1955 the factory grew from 208 employees, 58,368 spindles, and 42 looms to 9,360 employees, 222,516 spindles, and 4,091 looms. In 1960, a weaver at the factory named Taisia Marchenko received the Hero of Socialist Labour title. By the 1960s the enterprise had returned to the height of its production and became one of the largest textile manufacturers in the former Soviet Union. Kreenholm expanded its facilities and product offerings, notably adding art shops for design, giving the enterprise full production cycle capabilities. Employment reached around 12,500 people during this time.

In the early 1970s, the Soviet enterprise reportedly used 13,000 hectares (32,000 acres) of land and employed 12,000 people. From 1981 to 1985, Kreenholm went under a restructuring that increased outputs and improved working conditions. In 1985, Kreenholm was one of three enterprises selected in Estonia to experiment with exporting products outside of the USSR and entering foreign markets. This increased Kreenholm's investments and product offerings, leading to a peak of 4 million dollars in exports in both 1989 and 1990. After 1986, the company did not have to rely on approvals from the textile ministry in Moscow, as it had gained the authorisation to independently export its goods.

After Estonia restored its independence in 1991, Kreenholm had to go through a difficult transition while entering the global market economy. The national government founded the Kreenholm Manufacturing State Enterprise to help renew production. The privatisation process in Estonia started in 1994, and on 1 January 1995 a Swedish company Borås Wäfveri AB acquired the enterprise. It was renamed Krenholm Group and the realignment included several production units, including: Krenholm Finishing, Krenholm Sewing, Krenholm Spinning, Krenholm Terry Clothes, Krenholm Weaving, and Krenholm Service. It also owned major sales subsidiaries Krenholm Textile, Krenholm Scandinavia AB, and Krenholm Germany GmbH. Narva became the main production site for the group, and as of 1999 Borås Wäfveri AB owned all shares of the group.

=== 21st century ===
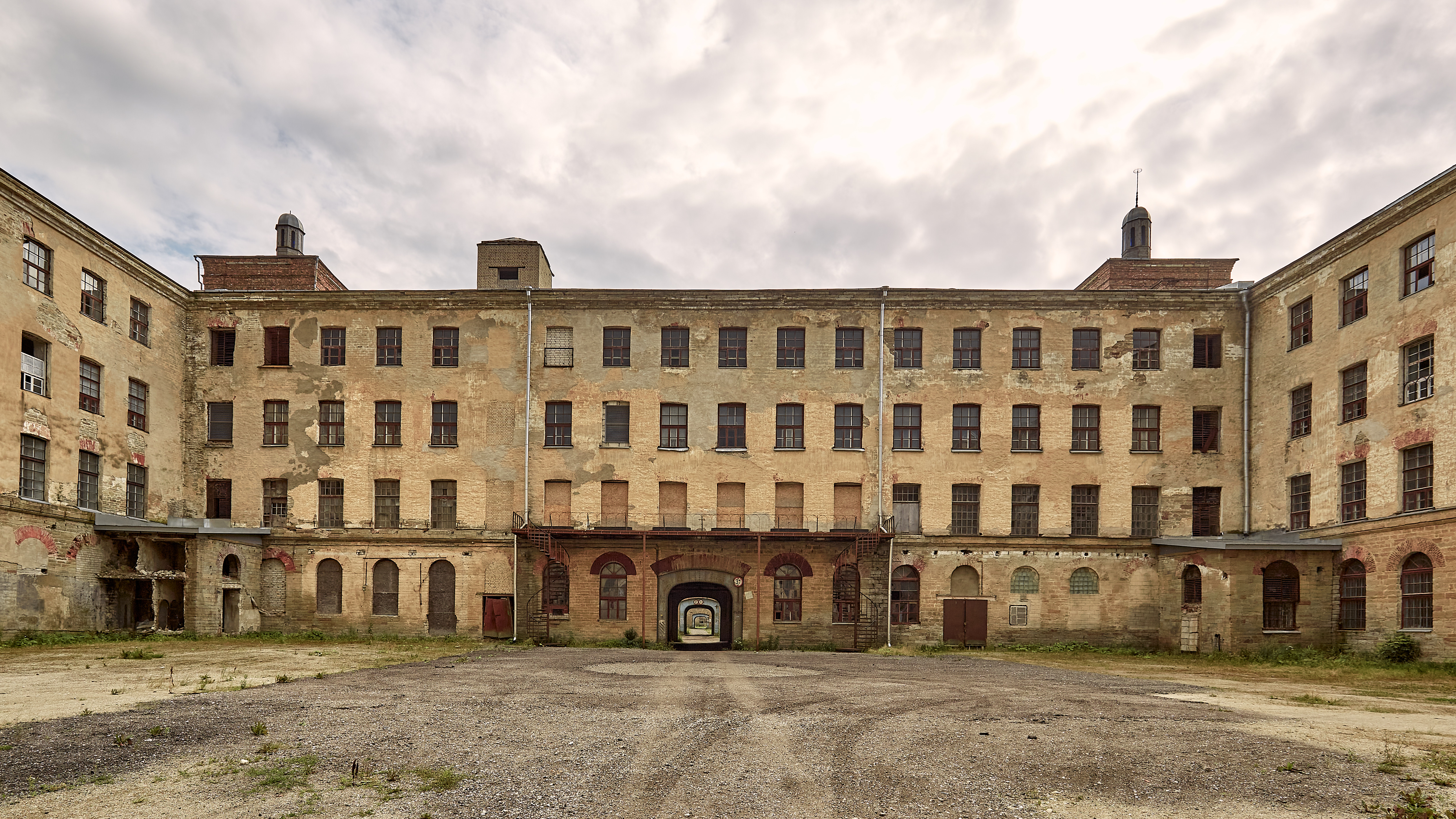
The factory building in 2020

In 2000, Kreenholm's sales reached a market economy time peak at 1.24 million kroons. The company exported 86% of its production in 2001 with the majority of it going to EU and US markets. In 2002 the company employed 4,900 people. Throughout the early 2000s the company lost money and went under restructuring; many employees lost their jobs. In 2003, the company was forced to fire 170 workers after the closure of its spinning facility. In early 2004, the company had 4,600 workers, of which a further 400 were laid off in April 2004. During this time, the World Bank recommended that the company would need to cut down its labor force to 3,800 to avoid financial crisis. Amidst the layoffs, Narva trade unions held a silent protest outside of the Kreenholm headquarters. Despite the troubles, the company was able to stay afloat due to financing received from Estonian banks and the International Finance Corporation. In 2007, the Narva Gate PLC purchased the land Kreenholm was on.

The Krenholm company was eventually declared bankrupt in November 2010. It was purchased by the Swedish company Prod i Ronneby AB whose affiliate company in Narva, Eurotekstiil, would continue some of the operations; there were about 500 people employed when bankruptcy was declared, along with 9.5 million euros worth of debt still belonging to the manufacturer. By 2012, the company chairman stated that it would be "absolutely impossible" to restore the previous scale of operations. There are currently plans to build a manufacture cultural quarter in the Kreenholm site. In 2012, Eurotekstiil changed its name to Kreenholmi Manufaktuur OÜ and acquired the trademark of the old factory for use on its line of textile products, such as curtain rolls and satin bedding. The company employed 31 workers in 2021.

== In fiction ==
Eduard Vilde's 1898 novel Raudsed käed is set at the Kreenholm Manufacturing Company.

== See also ==
- Textile manufacture during the Industrial Revolution
