= Raudsed käed =

Book by Eduard Vilde

- Author: Eduard Vilde
- Language: Estonian
- Publication date: 1898
- Publication place: Estonia
- Media type: Print

Raudsed käed (Iron Hands) is an 1898 novel by Eduard Vilde.

It is the first Estonian worker's novel, and its action takes place in Narva. The protagonist of the novel is Villem, who comes from the countryside to the city to work at the Kreenholm Manufacturing Company. At first, the city and factory work seem promising, but over the years life goes downhill due to hard work, and Villem is no longer able to take care of his family or himself.

The highly tragic final events of the novel bear a noticeable resemblance to Émile Zola's work Thérèse Raquin, published in 1867. In Vilde's works, Zola's influence is evident elsewhere.
