= Kreenholm =

River island in Narva, Estonia

Coordinates: 59°21′28″N 28°11′50″E

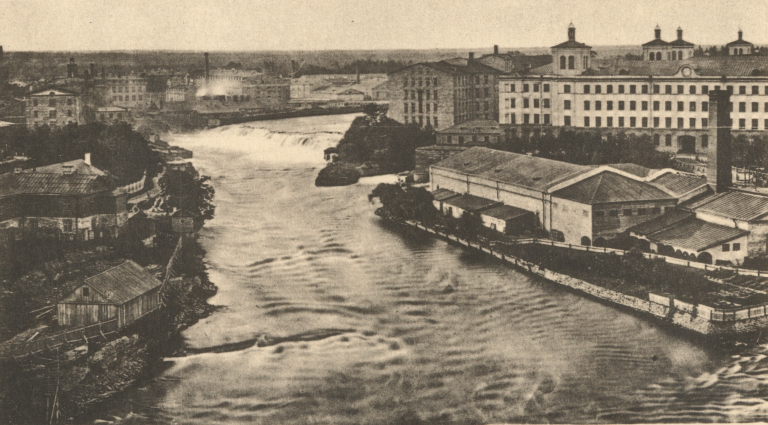
The eastern branch of Narva Falls and Kreenholm island (right) in 1886

Kreenholm (German: Krähnholm for crow islet) is a river island in Estonia, located in the Narva River, within the city limits of Narva.

The island is 13 hectares (32 acres) in area, and is 750 meters (820 yd) long and 250 meters (270 yd) wide. The island divides Narva Falls into eastern and western branches; the Estonia–Russia border runs through the eastern branch.

In the 14th century, a sawmill was already operating on Kreenholm. In 1538, the Livonian Order built a watermill on the left bank of the river just opposite the island, and in 1823 a cloth factory operated by a local merchant, Paul Momma, was opened on the right bank of the Narva River. Baron Stieglitz's flax mill was located on the right bank.

In 1856, German industrialist Ludwig Knoop acquired the whole island and founded a textile factory there, which was known as the Krenholm Manufacturing Company. The factory has been derelict since 2010.

== See also ==
- Kreenholm strike
