= Narew (disambiguation) =

Narew is a river in Poland and partially in Belarus

Narew or Narev may also refer to:

- Gmina Narew, Poland
- Narew, Podlaskie Voivodeship, Poland
- Independent Operational Group Narew, Poland
- Narew Offensive, a World War I German offensive
- Ian Narev (born 1967), Australian bank executive
- Russian ship Narev, armed steamship of Warsaw Flotilla of the Russian Empire Navy

== See also ==
- Narva (disambiguation)
