= Boris Kabur =

Estonian writer (1917–2002)

Boris Kabur (15 September 1917 – 28 January 2002) was an Estonian writer and translator, he was of Mordovian origin on his father's side. He is mainly known for his science fiction books.

In 1941, he received his master's degree in mathematics and natural sciences from the University of Tartu. In 1947, he was imprisoned by Soviet authorities and sent to a prison camp in Siberia. He was freed in 1954. In the course of working in a prison camp, he co-constructed the handheld chainsaw Druzhba. In 1954, he went back to Estonia and became a freelance writer.

He was a member of student corporation Veljesto. From 1966, he was the member of Estonian Writers' Union.

Kabur was married three times. His first wife was journalist, writer and translator Salme Kõiv. The couple married in 1937 and divorced in 1940. His second marriage was to biographer Vaime Kabur. The couple later divorced. His third wife was writer Astrid Reinla.

== Works ==
- 1967: children's play "Rops. Rops aitab kõiki" ('Rops Helps Everyone')
- 1973: short story "Kosmose rannavetes" ('In the Coastal Waters of Space')
