= Helle Kuningas =

Estonian actress (1949–2014)

Helle Kuningas (since 1978 Helle Ralja; 10 June 1949 – 10 October 2014) was an Estonian actress.

Kuningas was born in Pärnu to a family of journalists. Her uncle was an Estonian literary scholar, literary and theatre critic, cultural historian and translator Oskar Kuningas and her first cousin were chess player Merike Rõtova and writer Astrid Reinla. She graduated from Sindi Secondary School in 1968. From 1970 until 1972, she studied at Tallinn State Conservatory Stage Art Department. 1968–1970 and 1972–2010 she worked at Endla Theatre. Besides stage roles she acted also in films.

In 1978, she wed actor Eduard Ralja. The marriage produced a daughter. She died in 2014 in Pärnu.

== Filmography ==
- Ideaalmaastik (1980)
- Jõulud Vigalas (1980)
- Naerata ometi (1985)
- Georg (2007)
- Eestlanna Pariisis (2012)
- Vehkleja (2015)
