= Merike Rõtova =

Estonian chess player (born 1936)

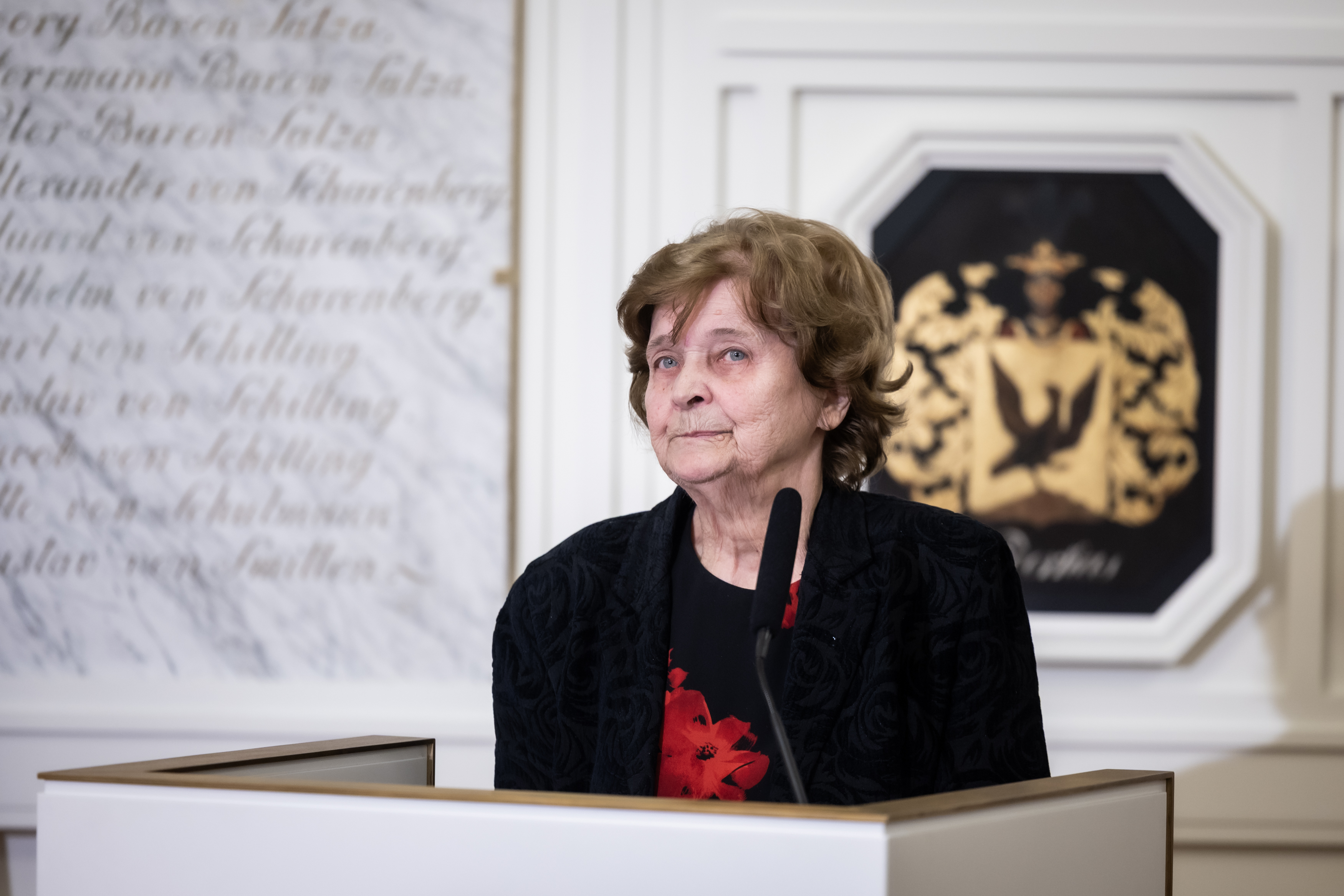

Personal information
- Born: August 19, 1936 (age 89) Tallinn, Estonia

Chess career
- Country: Soviet Union; Estonia
- Title: ICCF Lady Grandmaster (1996)
- ICCF rating: 2123 (October 2017)
- ICCF peak rating: 2276 (July 1995)

Merike Rõtova (née Merike Kuningas; born August 19, 1936), is an Estonian chess player, International Correspondence Chess Grandmaster (LGM, 1996).

== Biography ==
Rõtova was born in Tallinn. Her father was literary scholar, literary and theatre critic, cultural historian and translator Oska Kuningas. Her younger sister was writer Astrid Reinla and her first cousin was actress Helle Kuningas. She graduated from secondary school in Türi (1954) and the University of Tartu (1959). From 1959 to 1978 she worked as a literary editor in the Estonian radio, from 1978 to 1980 – as an editor in the publishing house "Eesti Raamat", but from 1980 to 1991 – as a coach of youth children sports school. Since 1992 the Estonian Correspondence Chess Federation board member.

Her father Oskar Kuningas (1911–1997), also a chess player and journalist, taught her to play chess. Rõtova won silver (1975) and bronze medals (1999) in Estonian Women's Chess Championship. Twice (1993, 1994) she had the second place in the World Senior Chess Championship.

Rõtova is a correspondence chess player who holds the titles of Lady International Correspondence Chess Master (LIM, 1991), Lady International Correspondence Chess Grandmaster (LGM, 1996), and won Silver Bertl von Massow Medal (2003) and Gold Bertl von Massow Medal (2008). She won bronze medal in 2nd Ladies Correspondence Chess World Championship (1972–1977) and silver medal in 3rd Ladies Correspondence Chess World Championship (1978–1984). As member the USSR team won the gold medal in 3rd Ladies Correspondence Chess Olympiad Final (1986–1992).

Rõtova is married to an Estonian chess master Boris Rõtov (1937–1987). The couple have a son, Igor Rõtov (1963) and daughter Regina Narva (WFM, 1970-), who were also chess players. Her granddaughters Triin Narva (WFM, 1994) and Mai Narva (WGM and IM, 1999) are also chess players. Mai Narva is four times Estonian Women's Chess Championship winner (2014, 2016, 2017, 2020) and European U16 Girls Champion (2014).
