= Boris Rõtov =

Russian-Estonian chess player

Personal information
- Born: 20 August 1937 Moscow, Russian SSR, Soviet Union
- Died: 10 September 1987 (aged 50) Tallinn, Estonian SSR, Soviet Union

Chess career
- Country: Estonia

Boris Rõtov (Estonian: Boriss Rõtov; 20 August 1937 – 10 September 1987) was a Russian-Estonian chess player who won the Estonian Chess Championship (1978).

== Biography ==
Boris Rõtov was born and raised in Moscow, Russia, where he graduated secondary school. From 1964 he lived and worked in the Tallinn. In 1969 he won the Baltic Chess Championship in Riga. In the 1970s he moved into the top chess players rank in Estonia. He played three times for Estonia in the Soviet Team Chess Championships (1972, 1975, 1975). He also participated three times in the prestigious International Chess tournaments in Tallinn, where in 1973 he ranked 10th, in 1975 – 12th, and in 1979 – 15th. In 1978 Boris Rõtov won the Estonian Chess Championship. He was three times medalist in the Estonian Chess Championship: 2nd in 1975 and 1974 and 3rd in 1976. He participated in Latvian Chess Championship in 1971 and finished 3rd.

In the last years of his life he worked as a coach in the Paul Keres Chess Club in Tallinn, the city where he died. His wife Merike (born 1936) and son Igor (born 1963) were also chess players, and his daughter Regina Narva (born 19 May 1970), née Rõtova, is a Woman FIDE Master, and herself the mother of two Rõtov's granddaughters: Triin Narva (1994– ) and Mai Narva (1999– ). The last three all played in the Estonian Women's team at the 2014 Chess Olympiad.
