= Horisont =

Estonian popular science magazine

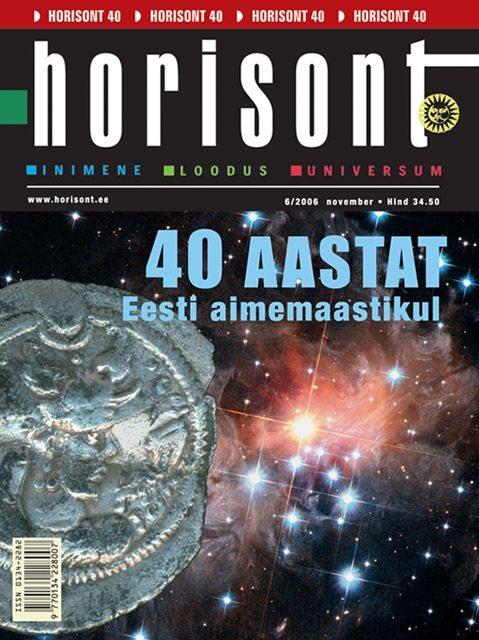
- Cover
- First issue: 1967
- Website: Official website

Horisont is an Estonian magazine published in Tallinn, Estonia by Loodusajakiri MTÜ. The magazine focuses on science topics and is written in a popular scientific style. It includes interviews with scientists.

From 1967 to 1990 it was published by EKP KK Kirjastus, from 1991 to 2001 by Perioodika, and thereafter by Loodusajakiri MTÜ.
