= Mai Narva =

Estonian chess player (born 1999)

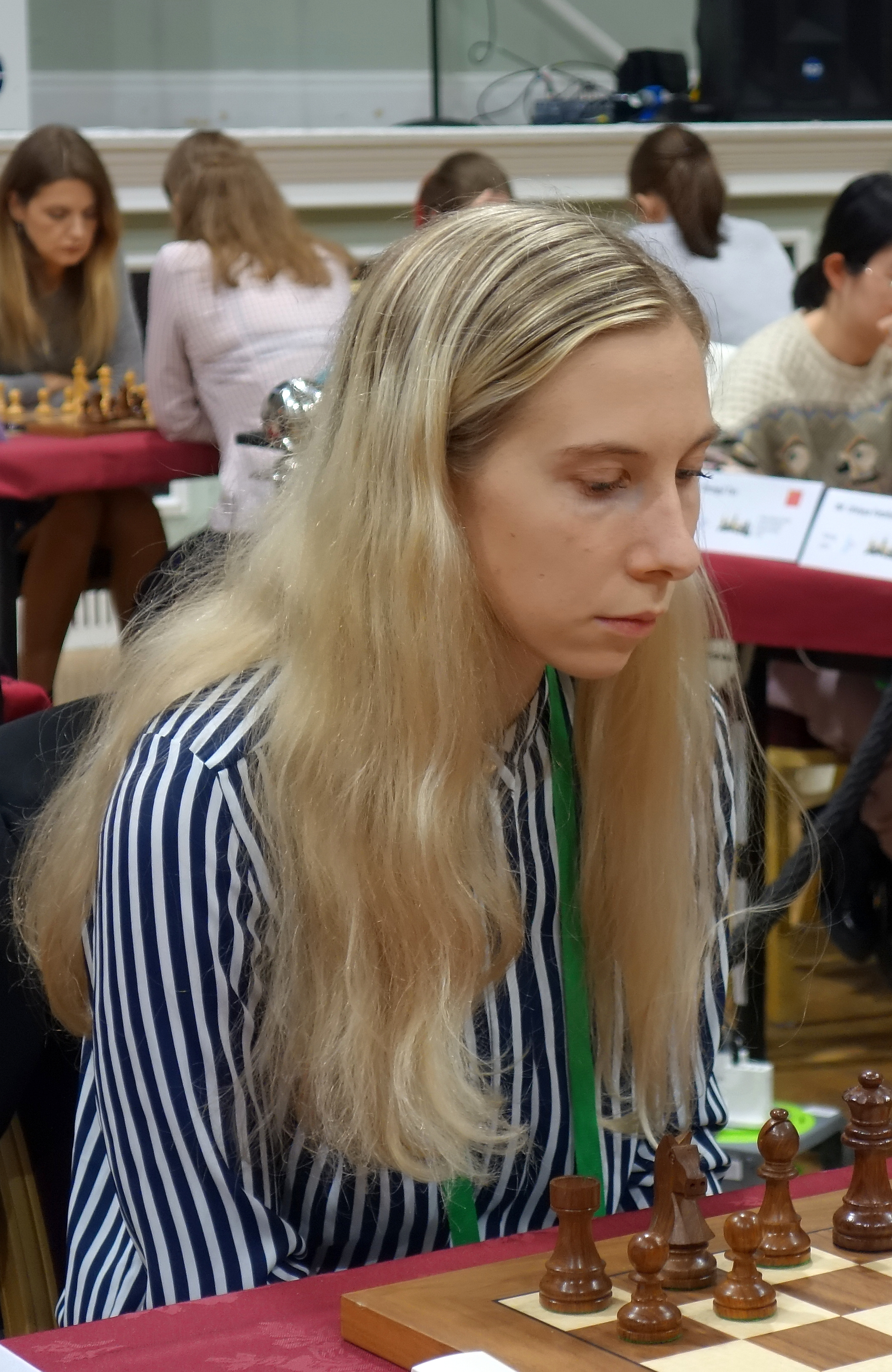
- Narva in 2023

Personal information
- Born: October 22, 1999 (age 26) Tallinn, Estonia

Chess career
- Country: Estonia
- Title: International Master (2022); Woman Grandmaster (2021)
- FIDE rating: 2405 (July 2026)
- Peak rating: 2426 (May 2026)

Mai Narva (born October 22, 1999) is an Estonian chess player holding the titles of International Master and Woman Grandmaster.

== Biography ==
Mai Narva was born in a chess player's family. She is Estonian chess master Boris Rõtov's and Lady International Correspondence Chess Grandmaster Merike Rõtova's granddaughter. Her father, Jaan Narva, is a FIDE Master, and her mother, Regina Narva, and sister, Triin Narva, both hold the Woman FIDE Master title.

Mai Narva won the Estonian Women's Chess Championship four times: 2014, 2016 (after play-off), 2017 and 2020. She also won silver medal in 2013 Estonian Women's Chess Championship and shared second place in 2015 Estonian Open Chess Championship. In 2014, Mai Narva won 24th European Youth Chess Championship U16 (girls) in Batumi. In 2015, she was a member of Estonian U18 national team that won the 15th European U18 Team Chess Championship (girls) in Karpacz.

In 2024, she won silver medal in Estonian Men's Chess Championship.

Narva won the bronze medal at the 2025 European Women's Championship in Greece.

Mai Narva played for Estonia in Chess Olympiads:

- In 2014, at first board in the 41st Chess Olympiad (women) in Tromsø (+6 −4 =1);
- In 2016, at first board in the 42nd Chess Olympiad (women) in Baku (+3 -5 =2);
- In 2018, at first board in the 43rd Chess Olympiad (women) in Batumi (+6, =3, -1);
- In 2022, at first board in the 44th Chess Olympiad (women) in Chennai (+4, =2, -3);
- In 2024, at first board in the 45th Chess Olympiad (women) in Budapest (+6, =2, -2).

She studied at Gustav Adolf Grammar School. She was a member of the UMBC chess team. In 2022 she graduate of University of Maryland, Baltimore County as Bachelor of Arts in Psychology.
