= Triin Narva =

Estonian chess player (born 1994)

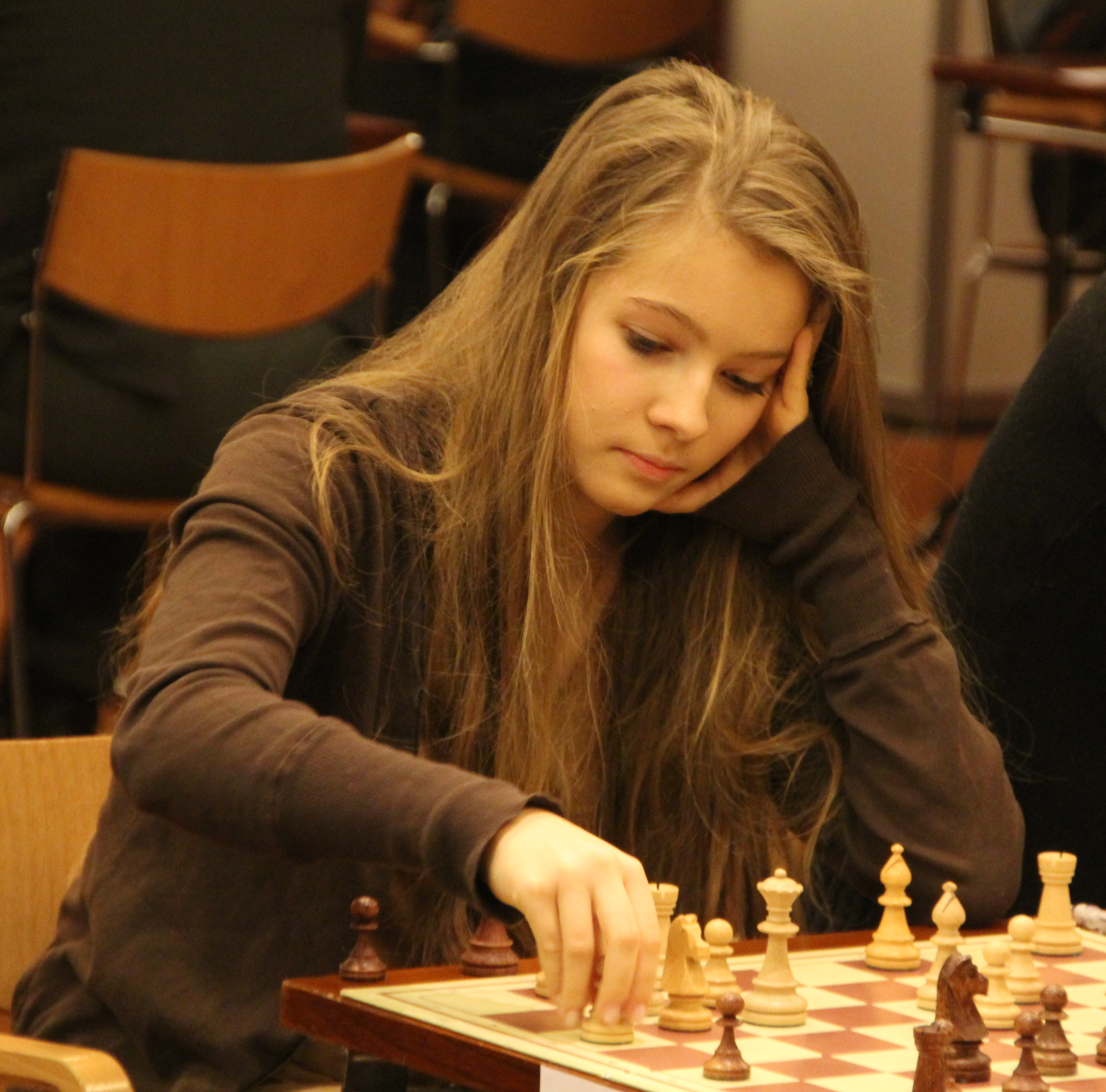
- Narva in 2011

Personal information
- Born: November 12, 1994 (age 31) Tallinn, Estonia

Chess career
- Country: Estonia
- Title: Woman FIDE Master (2016)
- Peak rating: 2129 (April 2019)

Triin Narva (born November 12, 1994) is an Estonian chess player who holds the title of Woman FIDE Master (2016).

== Biography ==
Narva was born into a chess playing family. She is the granddaughter of Estonian chess champion Boris Rõtov and Woman International Correspondence Chess Grandmaster Merike Rõtova. Her father Jaan Narva is FIDE master, while both her mother Regina Narva and her sister Mai Narva have won the Estonian Women's Chess Championship.

== Chess career ==
From 2004 to 2011, Narva won twelve Estonian Junior Chess Championships in different age groups (U10, U12, U14, U16, U18). From 2003 to 2012 she participated in the European Junior Chess Championships and the World Junior Chess Championships in different age groups. Her best result was a 3rd place at the European Junior Chess Blitz Championship in the group under 18 years (2012). She has won 3 silver (2010, 2011, 2012) and 4 bronze medals (2009, 2014, 2020, 2021) in the Estonian Women's Championship. Narva also won the Estonian Rapid and Blitz Chess Championships in 2010.

Narva played for Estonia in four Chess Olympiads:

- 2010, on the reserve board in the 39th Chess Olympiad in Khanty-Mansiysk (+5 −2 =0);
- 2012, on the third board in the 40th Chess Olympiad in Istanbul (+3 −3 =3);
- 2014, on the third board in the 41st Chess Olympiad in Tromsø (+4 −3 =4);
- 2016, on the fourth board in the 42nd Chess Olympiad in Baku (+7 −0 =2);
- 2018, on the fourth board in the 43rd Chess Olympiad (women) in Batumi (+5, =2, -3);
- 2022, on the fourth board in the 44th Chess Olympiad (women) in Chennai (+2, =2, -2);
- 2024, on the fourth board in the 45th Chess Olympiad (women) in Budapest (+3, =3, -1).

== Private life ==
Narva graduated from the Gustav Adolf Grammar School in 2013.
