= Narva Falls =

Waterfall in Narva, Estonia

Coordinates: 59°21′32″N 28°11′44″E

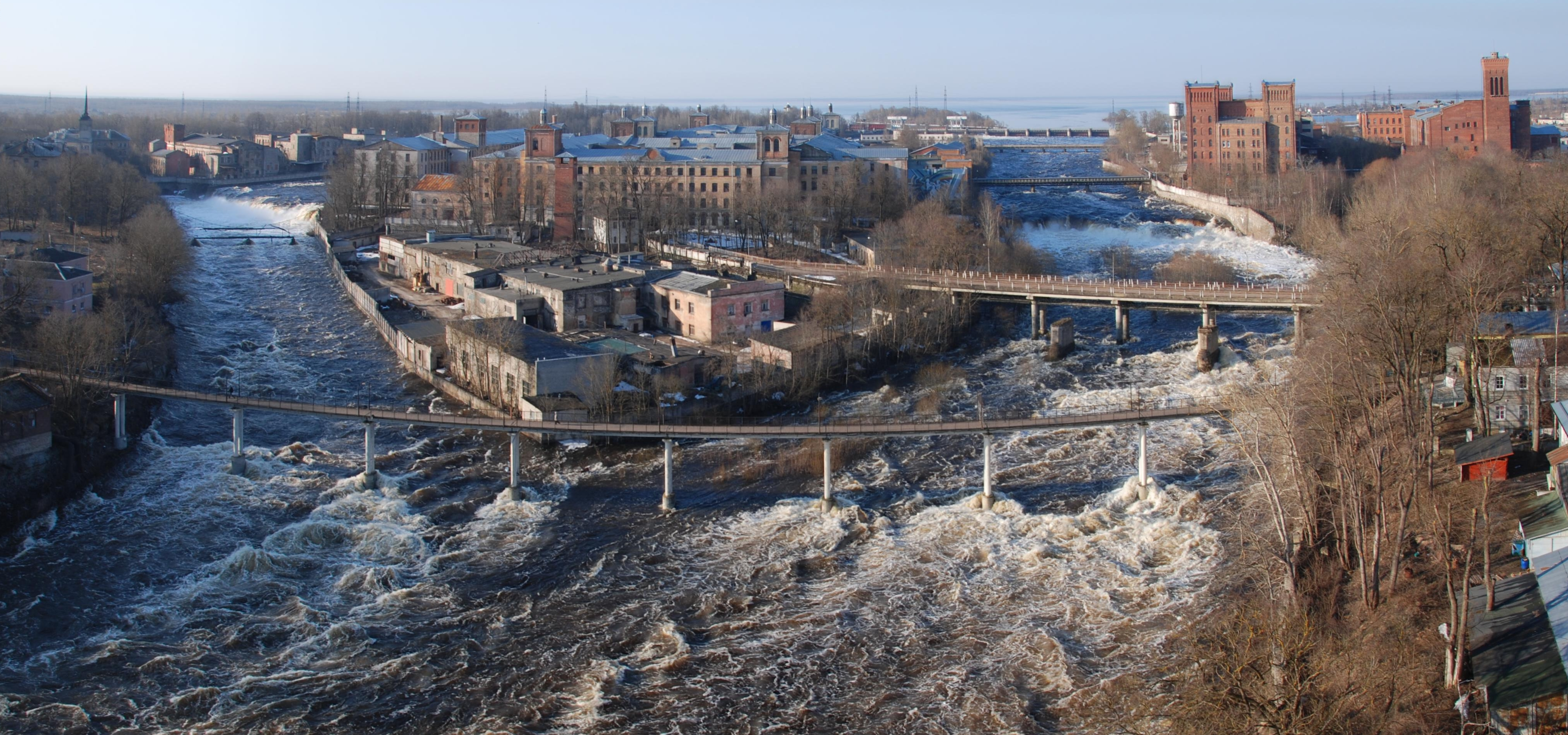
Aerial view of Narva Falls from north (2010)

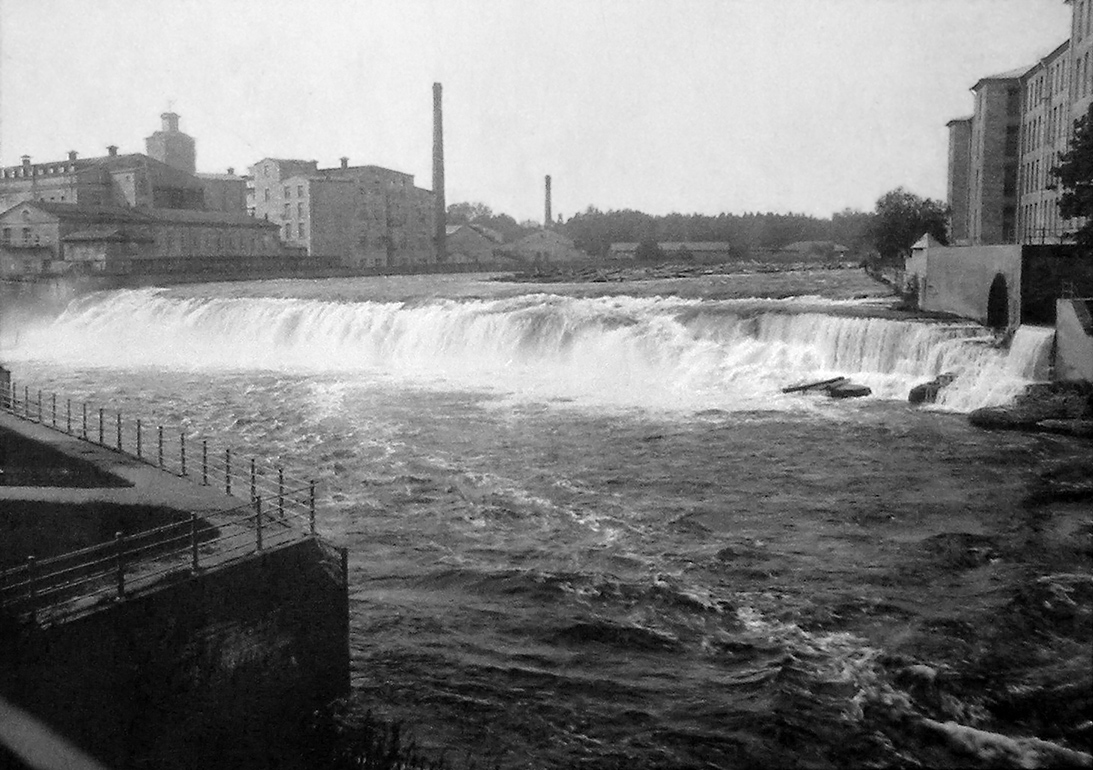
The western portion of the falls, viewed from Kreenholm island (1913)

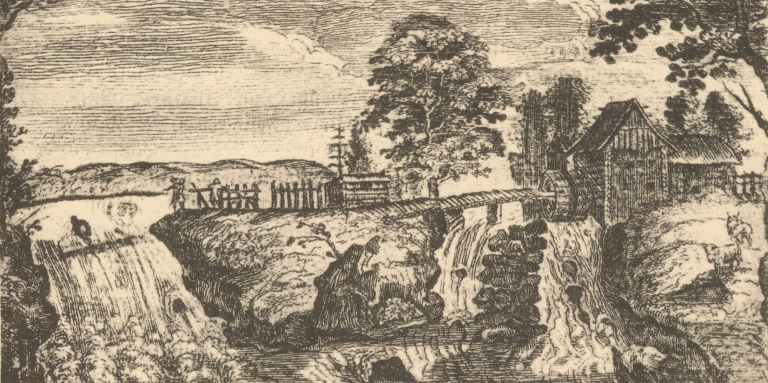
View of Narva Falls and Kreenholm island (1639)

Narva Falls (Estonian: Narva juga) is a pair of waterfalls on the Narva River in Estonia and Russia.

Between the southeast part of the city of Narva and the rest, facing the Russian town of Ivangorod, the Narva River flows over the Baltic Klint, forming the falls, once among the most powerful in Europe. Before the water reaches the falls, it is split into two branches by Estonia's Kreenholm island, thus the falls consist of two sections. Kreenholm Falls, west of the river island, is 60 meters (200 ft) wide and 6.5 meters (21 ft) high with multiple terraces. Joala Falls, to the east, is 110 meters (360 ft) wide and up to 6.5 meters (21 ft) high. The Estonian–Russian international border follows the eastern branch and goes through Joala Falls.

Since the creation of the Narva Reservoir in 1955, the falls are usually dry. Water is allowed to flow in the original stream bed for only a few days every year. Access to the waterfalls is limited because it is located in the border zone, and the surrounding area on the Estonian side is private property belonging to the Kreenholm Manufacturing Company.

== See also ==
- List of waterfalls
