= Regina Narva =

Estonian chess player (born 1970)

Personal information
- Born: 19 May 1970 (age 56) Tallinn, then part of Estonian SSR, Soviet Union

Chess career
- Country: Soviet Union (1970–1991); Estonia (1991–present)
- Title: Woman FIDE Master (2007)
- FIDE rating: 1901 (October 2020)
- Peak rating: 2101 (April 2007)

Regina Narva (née Rõtova; born 19 May 1970) is an Estonian chess Woman FIDE Master (2007).

== Biography ==
Narva was born in Tallinn, the daughter of Estonian chess players Boris Rõtov (1937–1987) and Merike Rõtova (1936).

In the Estonian Women's Chess Championship, Regina Narva has won gold (2011), silver (1989) and 6 bronze medals (1987, 2007, 2010, 2013, 2014, 2025). In 2013, she won the Estonian Rapid Chess Championship.

Regina Narva played for Estonia in three Chess Olympiads:

- In 2012, at reserve board in the 40th Chess Olympiad in Istanbul (+3 −2 =2);
- In 2014, at reserve board in the 41st Chess Olympiad in Tromsø (+1 −1 =2);
- In 2016, at reserve board in the 42nd Chess Olympiad in Baku (+2 −2 =1).

Regina Narva played for Estonia in the European Team Chess Championship:

- In 2007, at third board in Heraklion (+0 −1 =7).

== Family ==
Her husband Jaan Narva (1958–) is a FIDE master (2004). They have two chess-playing daughters Triin Narva (1994) and Mai Narva (1999). In 2014, 2016, 2017 and 2020 Mai Narva won the Estonian Women's Chess Championship and she is European U16 Girls Champion 2014. In the 2014 Chess Olympiad in Tromsø, Norway, all three played for the Estonian Women's team: Mai board 1, Triin Board 3, and Regina Board 5 (first reserve). Her brother Igor Rõtov is head editor in newspaper Äripäev.
