= Hermann Castle =

Castle in Narva, Estonia

- Hermanni linnus
- Narva, Estonia
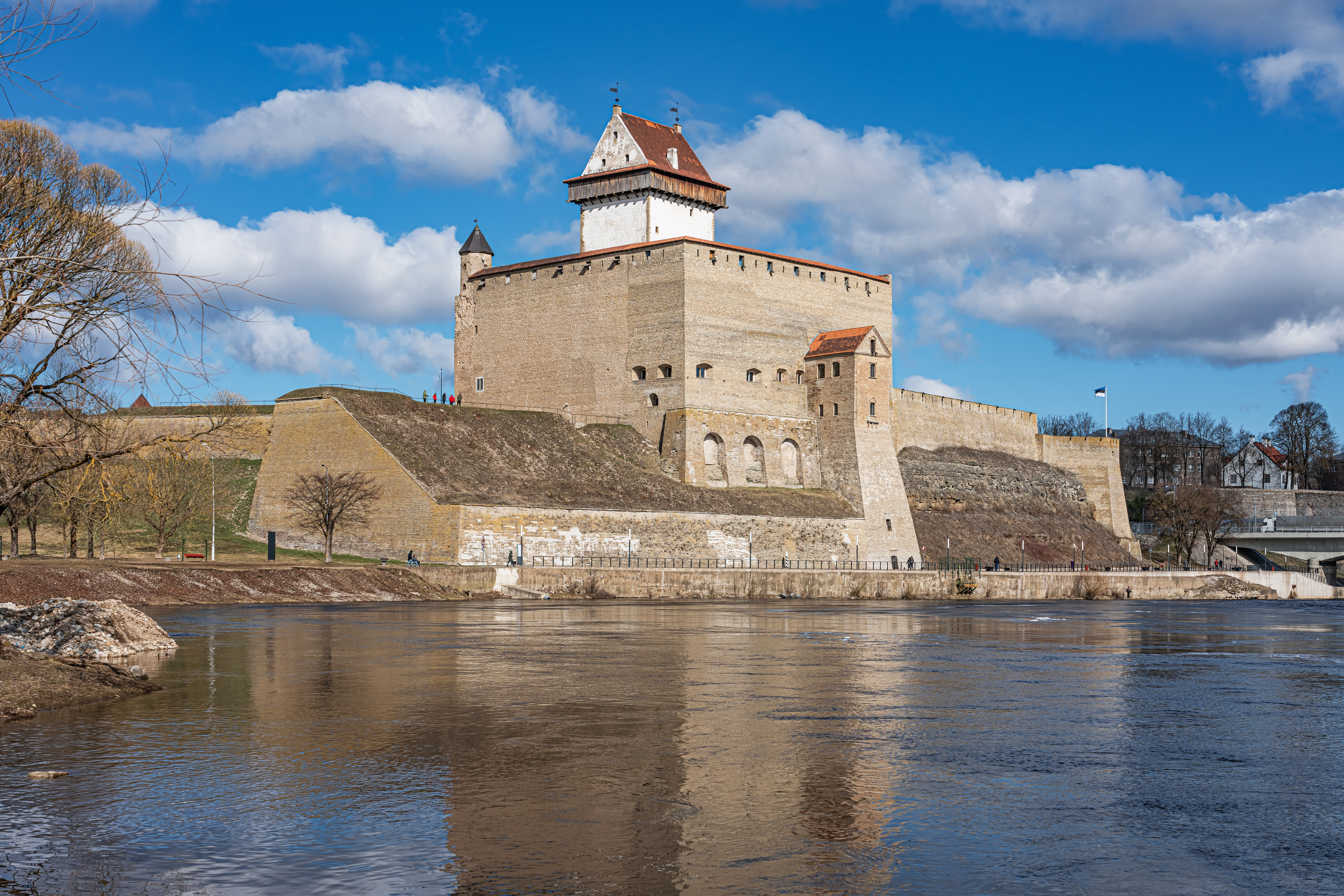

Site information
- Type: Order Castle

Location
- Location of Hermann Castle in Estonia
- Location within Estonia
- Coordinates: 59°22′33″N 28°12′5″E

Site history
- Built: 1256
- Built by: Kingdom of Denmark

Hermann Castle (Note: Estonian: Hermanni linnus, German: Hermannsfeste, Russian: Замок Герман), also known as the Narva castle or Narva fortress, is a medieval castle in the city of Narva, in northeastern Estonia. The castle was established around 1256, when the area was part of the Danish Realm. The first entirely stone fortifications were built in the beginning of the 14th century. The Livonian branch of the Teutonic Order purchased the castle in August 1346, and owned it for much of its later history.

== Medieval fortifications ==
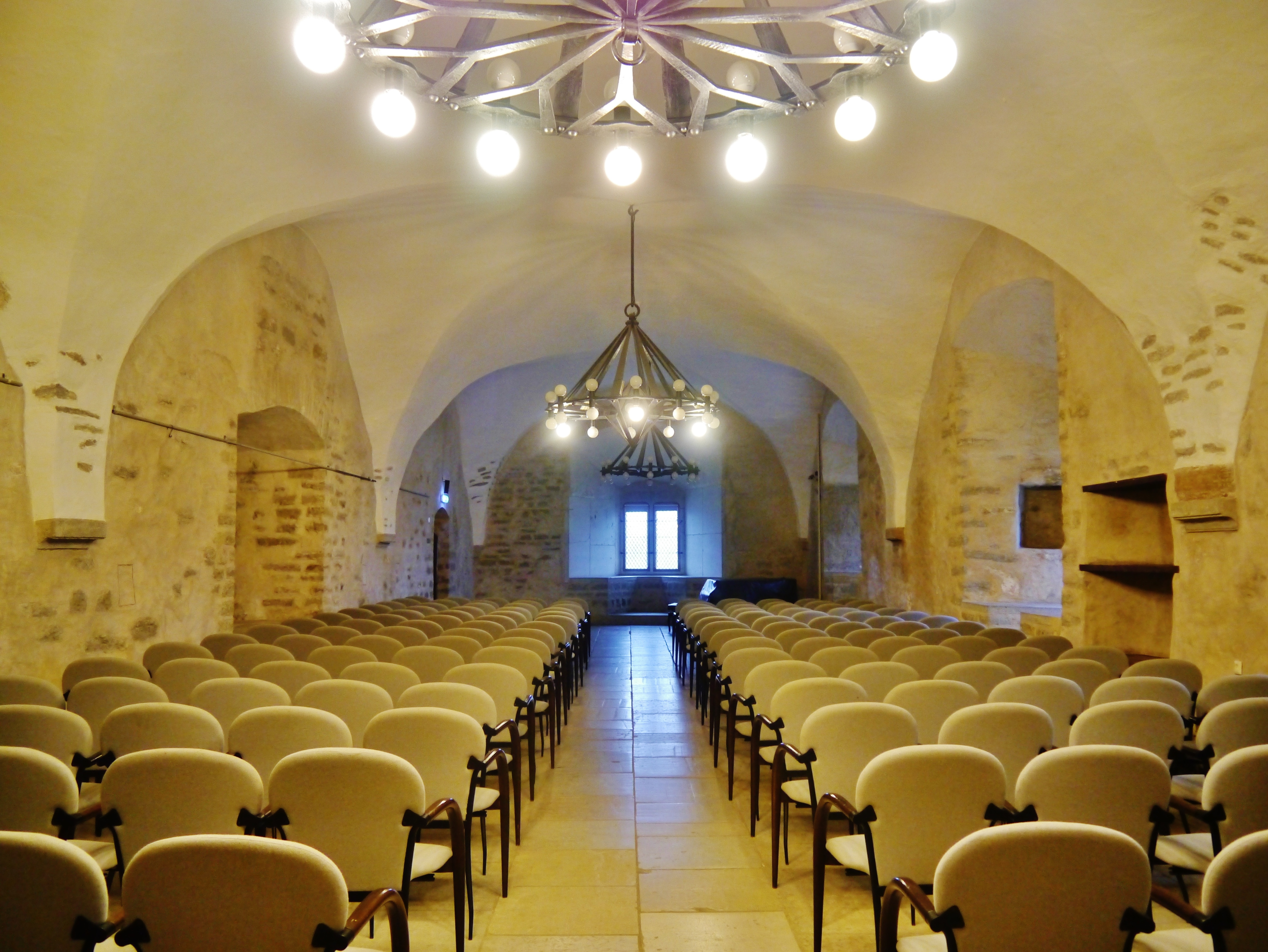
Hermann Castle interior

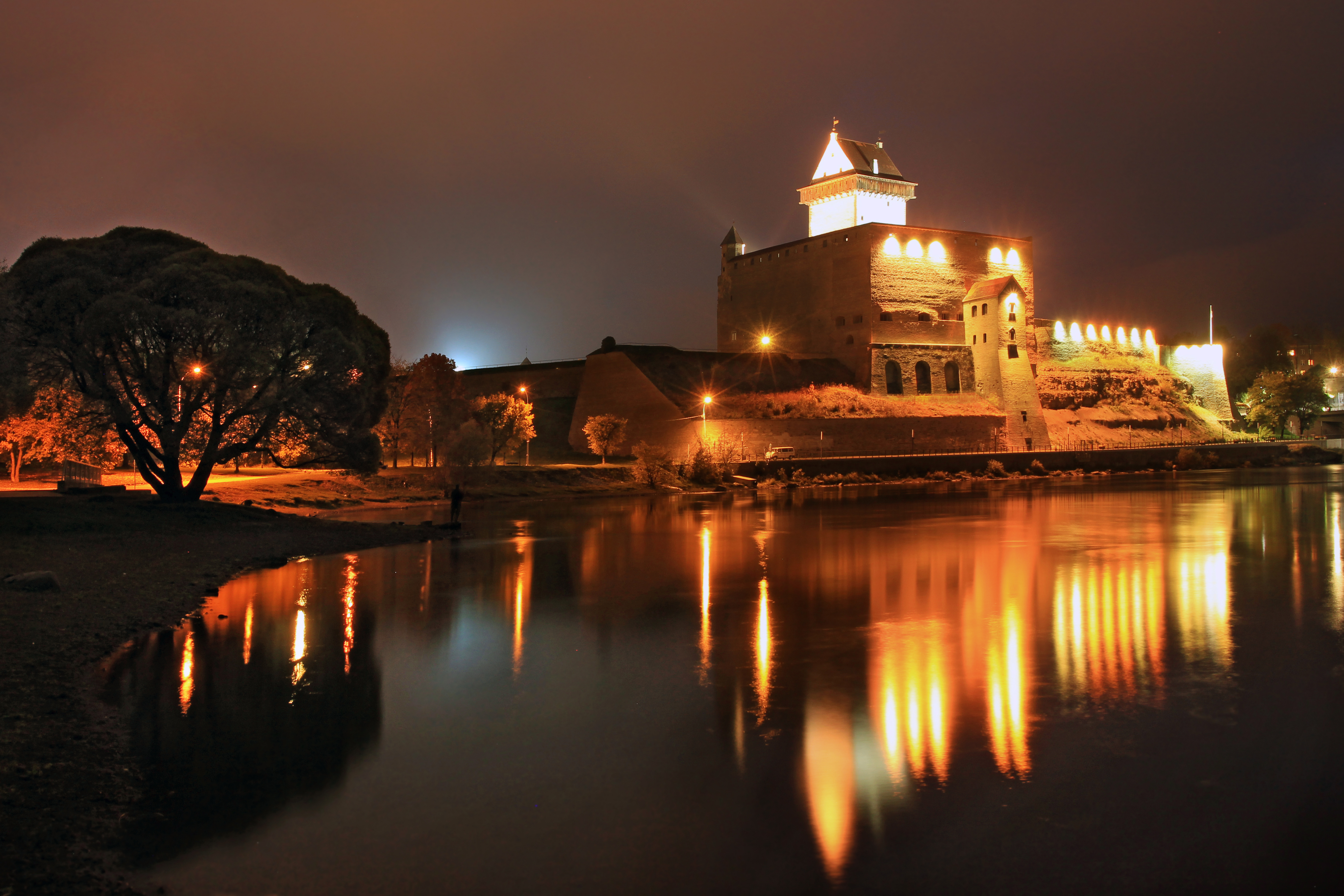
Night view of Narva Castle

The Kingdom of Denmark, having conquered northern Estonia in the 13th century, established a border stronghold, initially built of wood, at the intersection of the Narva river and an old road in the mid-13th century. Under the protection of the stronghold, which is first mentioned in writing in 1256, the earlier settlement developed into the town of Narva, which obtained the Lübeck town rights in the first half of the 14th century.

Following several conflicts with the neighbouring East Slavic states of Novgorod and Pskov, the Danish rulers started building a stone stronghold at the beginning of the 14th century as a border defense. It was initially a small castellum-like building with 40-meter-tall (130 ft) sides and a tower, the predecessor of today's Hermann Tower, at its northwestern corner.

At the beginning of the 14th century, a small forecourt was established at the north side of the stronghold and, in the middle of the century, a large forecourt was added to the west side, where citizens were allowed to hide in case of war, as the town of Narva was not surrounded by a wall during Danish rule.

In 1346, King Valdemar IV of Denmark sold northern Estonia, including Narva, to the Livonian Order, who rebuilt the building into a convent building according to their needs. The stronghold has for the most part preserved the original ground plan, with its massive wings and a courtyard in the middle.

The Hermann Tower was also completed by the Livonian Order, necessitated by the establishment of the Ivangorod fortress by Muscovite Russia on the opposite side of the Narva river in 1492. The Order surrounded the town with a fortified wall, which has not been preserved (it was ordered to be demolished in 1777).

The wall is described as having had four gates: the "Viru gate" in the west, the "Herd gate" in the north, the "Old gate" leading to the river port in the east, and the "Water gate" (or "Small gate") in the south. The gates were covered with iron plates and preceded by drawbridges. The town wall, with a length of roughly a kilometer, was fortified with at least seven towers, and was surrounded by a moat.

Towards the end of the rule of the Livonian Order in the 16th century, the town wall was supplemented, the gates were strengthened by adding foregates, and several wall towers were adapted to use as special cannon towers or rondels, two of which can be seen today in their reconstructed shape in the corners of the castle's western court.

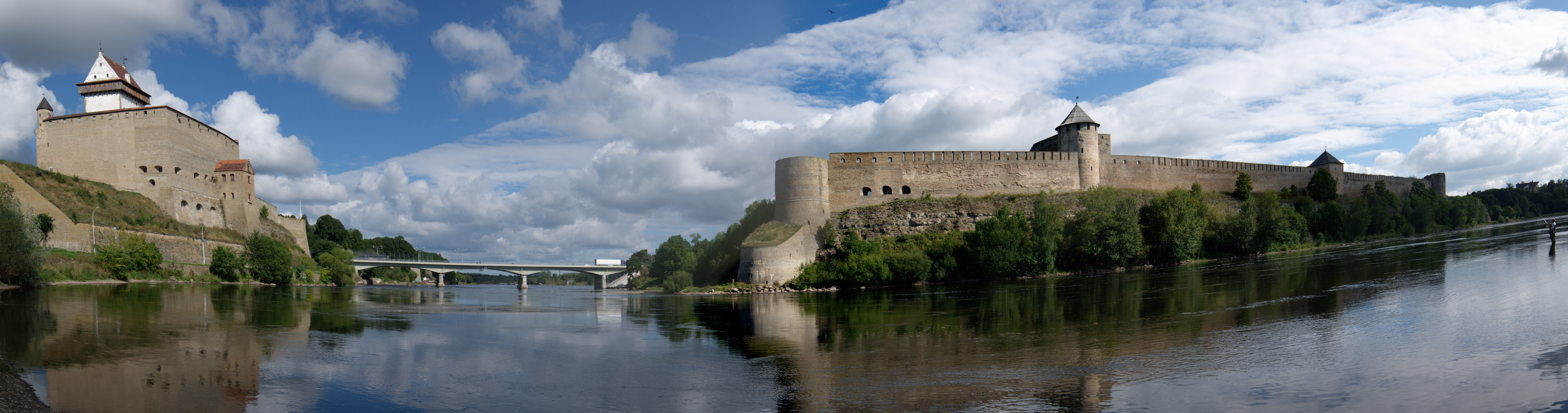
A view from the south towards the Hermann Castle (Estonia, on the left, west) and the opposite Ivangorod Fortress (Russia, to the right, east) opposite, with the Narva river in between

== See also ==
- History of Estonia
- List of castles in Estonia
