= Narva (river) =

River between Estonia and Russia

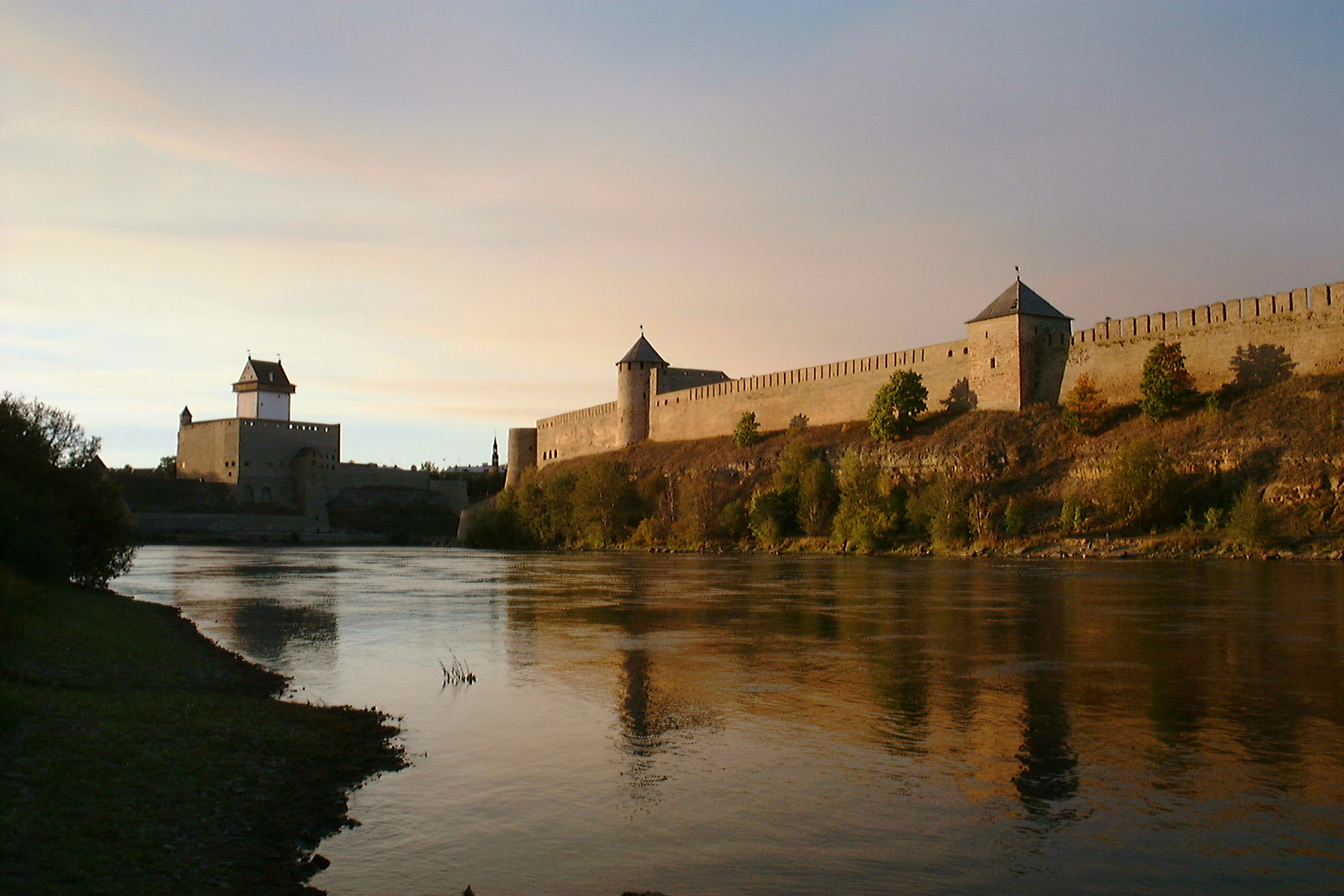
- The Narva flowing between Hermann Castle and Ivangorod Fortress

- Map of the Narva and Lake Peipus basins
- Native name: Narva jõgi (Estonian); Нарва (Russian)

Location
- Countries: Estonia; Russia
- Cities: Narva; Ivangorod; Narva-Jõesuu

Physical characteristics
- Source: Lake Peipus
  - coordinates: 58°59′14″N 27°43′50″E
  - elevation: 30 m (98 ft)
- Mouth: Narva Bay in Finnish Gulf
  - coordinates: 59°28′14″N 28°02′37″E
  - elevation: 0 m (0 ft)
- Length: 77 km (48 mi)
- Basin size: 56,225 km^{2} (21,709 sq mi)
- Discharge
  - average: 400 m^{3}/s (14,000 cu ft/s)

Basin features
- Tributaries
  - left: Jaama, Poruni, Mustajõgi
  - right: Plyussa, Rosson
- Basin countries: Russia (62.9%), Estonia (30.5%), Latvia (6.6%), Belarus (minute share)^{(see map)}

The Narva, (Note: Estonian pronunciation: [ˈnɑrʋɑ], German: Narwa, Russian: Нарва [ˈnarvə]) formerly also Narwa or Narova, is a river in northeastern Estonia flowing 77 kilometres (48 mi) north from Lake Peipus to the Baltic Sea. It is the largest Estonian river by discharge and forms part of the Estonia–Russia border.

The river gives its name to the archaeological (Neolithic) Narva culture, as well as the city of Narva. Narva is the third most populous urban area in Estonia and faces the Russian town of Ivangorod across the river.

At the coast, the river passes part of the Estonian resort town of Narva-Jõesuu. Its mouth opens into WNW-facing Narva Bay of the Gulf of Finland. The Narva gives the second-greatest discharge into the Gulf of Finland after the Neva River.

== Etymology ==
The etymology of the toponym Narva is not clear. According to one hypothesis it is related to the Finnic word narva which, for example, in Veps means 'waterfall' or 'stream'.

== Geography ==
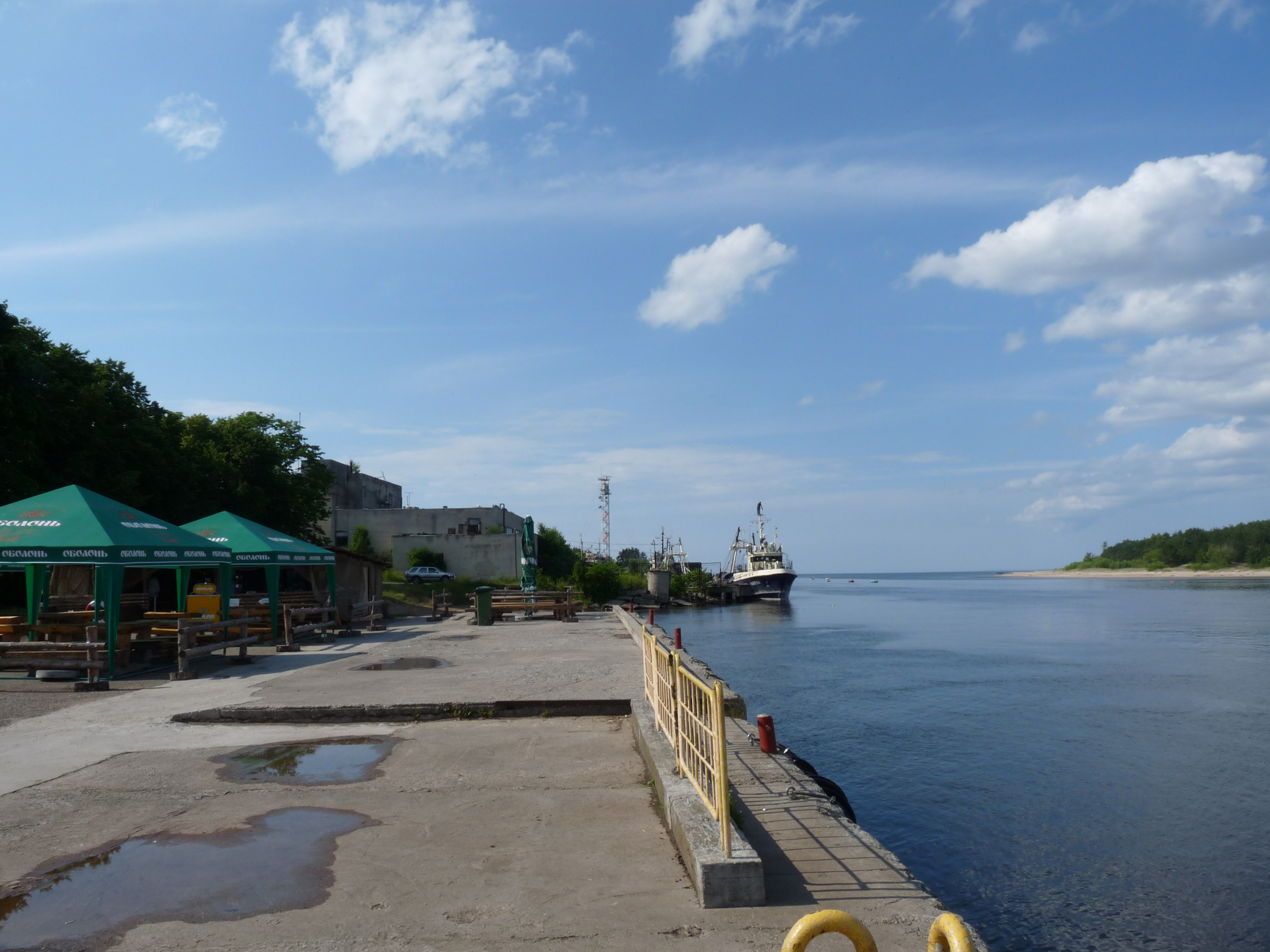
Pier by the Narva River's mouth as it enters into the Baltic Sea at Narva-Jõesuu (2009)

The Narva River has its source at the northeastern end of Lake Peipus, near the villages of Vasknarva (Estonia) and Skamya (Russia). There are a few more small villages on the upper section of the river, Permisküla and Kuningaküla on the Estonian side and Omuti on the Russian side, but up to the city of Narva the shores of the river are mostly forested or marshy land. The river is dammed entering Narva and Ivangorod, forming the Narva Reservoir, which extends up to 38 kilometres (24 mi) upstream. The Narva empties into Narva Bay near the Estonian town of Narva-Jõesuu, third largest settlement on the river after Narva and Ivangorod.

The Plyussa is the largest tributary, joining the Narva River at the reservoir from the right. The large Lake Peipus notably drains the much longer Russian river, the Velikaya, and a large, splayed drainage basin in the two countries.

The Rosson, a river connecting the Narva and the Luga, joins the Narva about 300 metres (980 ft) upstream from its mouth. The Rosson flows slowly and may change the direction of its flow, depending on water levels at both ends.

=== Waterfall ===
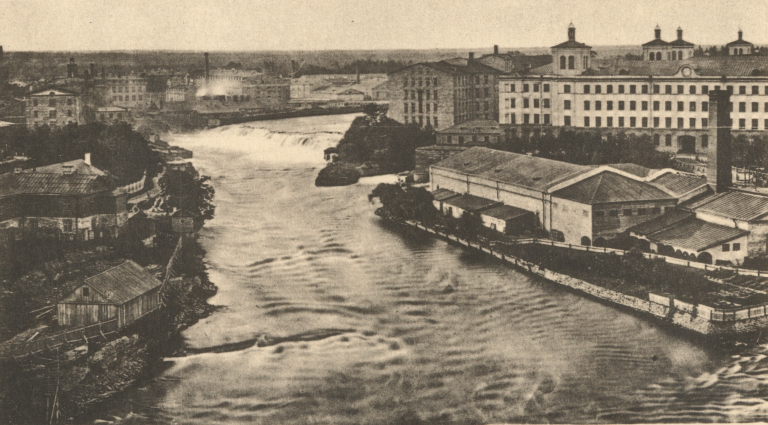
The eastern branch of Narva Falls and Kreenholm island (right) in 1886

Kreenholm (German: Krähnholm for crow islet) is a river island in Estonia, located in the Narva River, within the city limits of Narva.

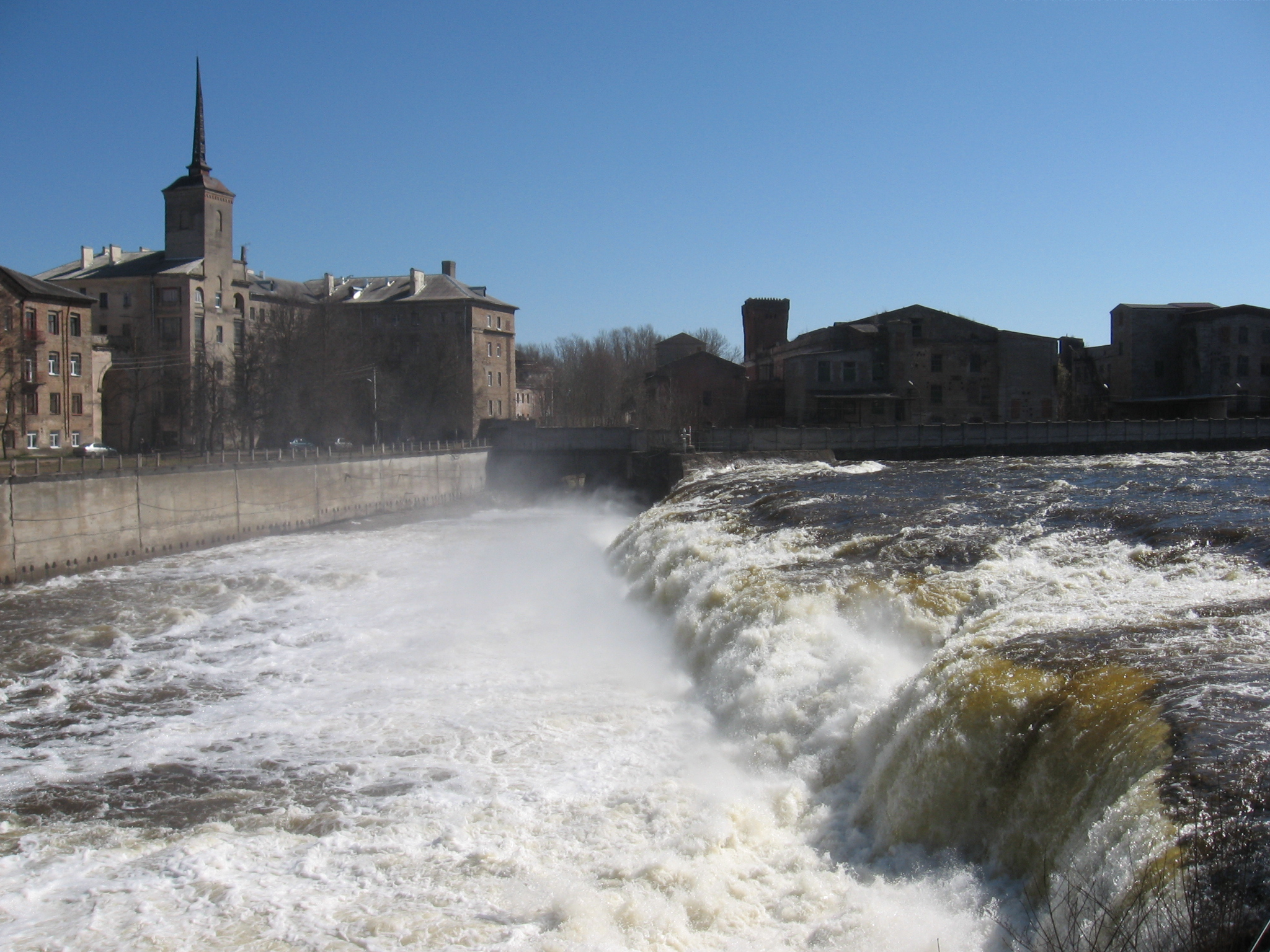
Joala Falls in spring 2010

Between the southeast part of the city of Narva and the rest, facing the Russian city of Ivangorod, the river flows over the Baltic Klint, forming Narva Falls, at times, as it historically was, the most powerful in Europe. Before the water reaches the falls it is split into two branches by the Kreenholm island, thus the falls consist of two branches. Kreenholm Falls, west of the island, is 60 metres (200 ft) wide and 6.5 metres (21 ft) high with multiple terraces. Joala Falls, to the east, is 110 metres (360 ft) wide and makes the same descent. The international border follows the latter.

Since the creation of Narva Reservoir, an anabranch, in 1955, the falls are usually near-dry, but water is allowed to flow in them for a few days each year. When in flow non-flying viewing access is difficult, being in the border zone and most of the west bank is private, closed industrial land belonging to Krenholm Manufacturing Company.

== History ==
The Narva was used as a trade route during the Viking Age, from the 5th to 11th centuries. It was an offshoot of the trade route from the Varangians to the Greeks.

The Narva has for centuries been an important border river. Beginning in the 13th century it was the border of Medieval Livonia and the Novgorod Republic. Though in earlier periods Narva was part of a larger buffer zone between the two territories, gradually the river emerged as the exact border. Castles built on the river banks (Narva Hermann Castle, founded at the beginning of the 14th century, Ivangorod fortress, established in 1492 and Vasknarva Castle, first built in the 14th century) were one of the main reasons behind this. Treaties from the 15th century between the Livonian Order and Novgorod Republic, later Tsardom of Russia, also recognize the Narva as the border. In the 17th century during the time of Swedish Estonia, when Ingria was also part of Sweden, the importance of the river as a border diminished. During the Russian Empire, from the end of the Great Northern War until the establishment of the Republic of Estonia in 1918, the Narva was the border of Governorate of Estonia and Saint Petersburg Governorate, with the exception of the town of Narva, which was part of the latter. By the Treaty of Tartu, signed in 1920, the Estonian–Russian border went slightly east of the river, up to 10 kilometres (6 mi), and, in particular, the town of Ivangorod was assigned to Estonia. In 1944 the former Estonian territory east of the river was transferred to Russian SFSR and the Narva was thus established as the eastern border of Estonian SSR, an internal border within USSR. In 1991 the same border became the de facto border of Estonia and Russia. Although no official border treaty has been ratified since then, today the Narva is the eastern border of the European Union and Schengen Zone.

=== Bridges ===
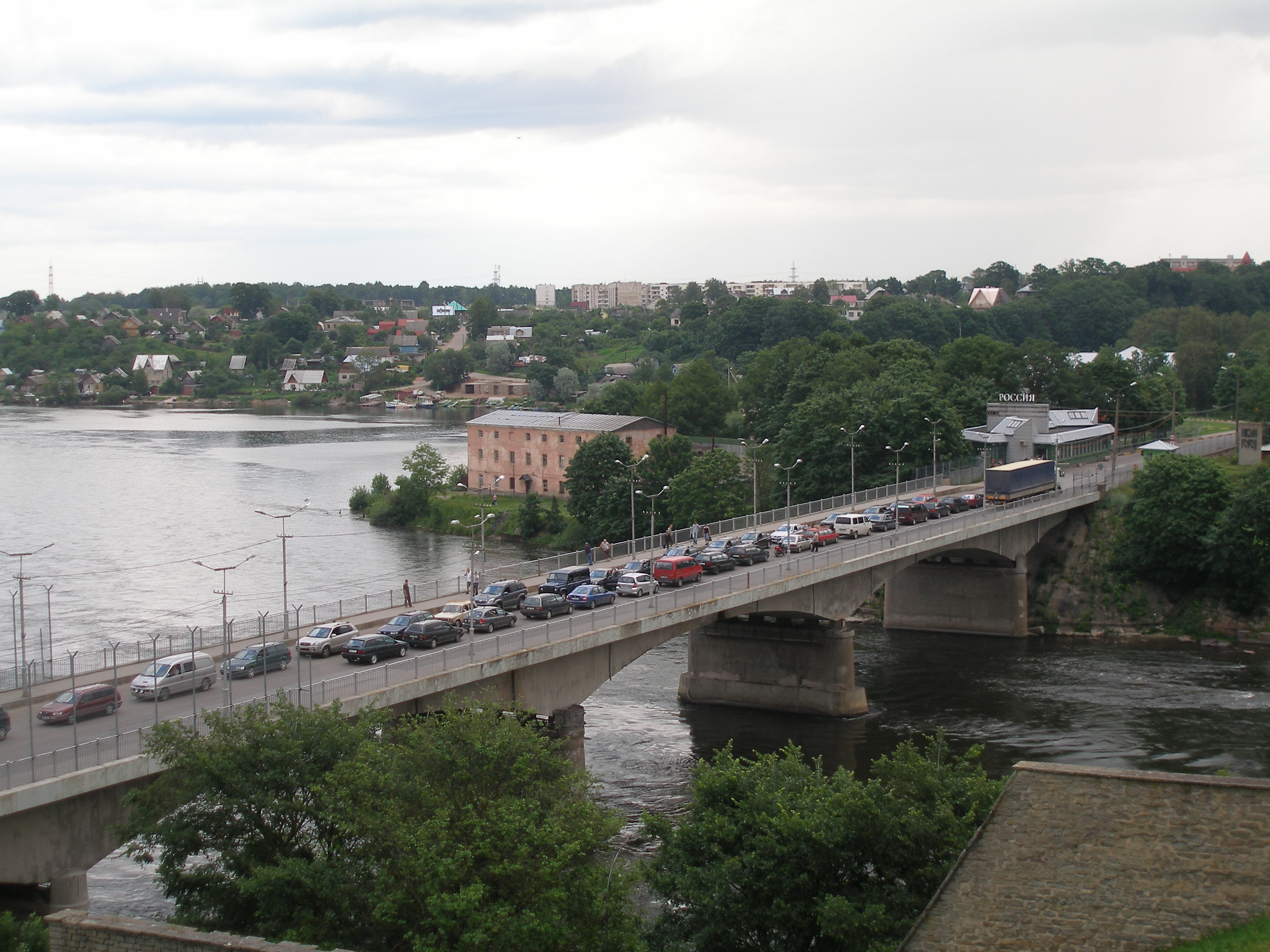
Tallinn-Saint Petersburg highway bridge

The Narva River is crossed only by a handful of bridges between Narva and Ivangorod. Besides the dam of the Narva Reservoir, these are, in downstream order:

- a pedestrian bridge below the Kreenholm island
- Narva Railway Bridge: Carrying the Tallinn–Saint Petersburg railway line.
- Friendship Bridge: The Tallinn–Saint Petersburg highway bridge on E20 just downstream from the Hermann Castle and Ivangorod Fortress. It was built in 1960 and is 162 metres (531 ft) long.

== Bibliography ==
- Feršel, Anne-Ly (2010). The River Narva (PDF). Estonian Environmental Board. ISBN 978-9949-9057-4-4. Archived from the original (PDF) on 3 December 2013.
