= 1943 in chess =

The below is a list of events in chess in 1943.

== Chess events in brief ==
- 9 March 1943 – Robert James Fischer born at Michael Reese Hospital in Chicago, Illinois, USA. His mother, Regina Wender, was a naturalized American citizen of Polish Jewish descent, born in Switzerland but raised in St. Louis, Missouri. Fischer's birth certificate listed Wender's husband, Hans-Gerhardt Fischer, a German biophysicist, as Fischer's father. The couple married in 1933 in Moscow, the Soviet Union, where Wender was studying medicine. Regina Fischer returned to the United States in 1939, while Hans-Gerhardt Fischer never entered the United States. Paul Neményi, a Hungarian Jewish physicist, may have been Fischer's biological father. Regina and Nemenyi had an affair in 1942, and he made monthly child support payments to Regina. Later, Bobby Fischer was World Chess Champion (1972–1975).

== Tournaments ==
- Kuibyshev won by Alexander Konstantinopolsky, February 1943.
- Mar del Plata won by Miguel Najdorf followed by Gideon Ståhlberg, Paul Michel, Héctor Rossetto, Hermann Pilnik, etc., 17–31 March 1943.
- Prague won by Alexander Alekhine ahead of Paul Keres, 4–29 April 1943.
- Sverdlovsk won by Mikhail Botvinnik followed by Vladimir Makogonov, Vasily Smyslov and Ilya Kan, etc., 20 April – 16 May 1943.
- Rio de Janeiro won by Erich Eliskases ahead of Octávio Trompowsky, Walter Cruz, etc., 17 May – 9 June 1943.
- Montevideo (the Uruguayan Chess Championship), won by Arturo Liebstein.
- Buenos Aires (the Argentine Chess Championship), won by Stahlberg ahead of Juan Iliesco.
- Rosario won by Najdorf ahead of Moshe Czerniak.
- Lviv won by Stepan Popel and Myroslav Turiansky.
- Diósgyőr (the Hungarian Chess Championship), won by Gedeon Barcza ahead of Géza Füster, and Lajos Asztalos.
- Kolozsvár won by Füster.
- Prague (the Bohemia and Moravia Chess Championship) won by František Zíta.
- Salzburg won by Paul Keres and Alekhine, followed by Paul Felix Schmidt, Efim Bogoljubow, Jan Foltys, and Ludwig Rellstab, 9–19 June 1943.
- Zlín won by Čeněk Kottnauer followed by Foltys, Luděk Pachman, Zíta, Jaroslav Šajtar, etc.
- Florence (the 10th Italian Chess Championship), won by Vincenzo Nestler ahead of Mario Napolitano.
- Baku won by Salo Flohr ahead of Vladimir Makogonov, June – July 1943.
- Sofia (the Bulgarian Chess Championship), won by Oleg Neikirch ahead of Alexander Tsvetkov, 11–25 July 1943.
- Tallinn won by Keres, 20–28 July 1943.
- Malmö (the Swedish Chess Championship), won by Bengt Ekenberg ahead of Erik Lundin and Olof Kinnmark.
- Stockholm won by Stig Lundholm and Gösta Stoltz.
- Dalhousie (the Canadian Chess Championship), won by Daniel Yanofsky.
- Ventnor City won by Anthony Santasiere and George Shainswit.
- Syracuse (the 44th U.S. Open), won by Israel Albert Horowitz ahead of Santasiere, August 1943.
- Vienna (the 10th German Chess Championship), won by Josef Lokvenc followed by Schmidt, Hans Zollner, Hans Müller, Rellstab, Karl Gilg and Georg Kieninger, etc., start 15 August 1943.
- Kuibyshev won by Isaac Boleslavsky ahead of Konstantinopolsky, August – September 1943.
- Rio de Janeiro (Quadrangular), won by Eliskases, September 1943.
- Madrid won by Keres ahead of Fuentes, Alfred Brinckmann, 4–21 October 1943.
- Krynica (the 4th GG-ch) won by Lokvenc, 25 November – 5 December 1943.
- Vienna won by Ernst Grünfeld ahead of Müller, start 27 November 1943.
- Stockholm won by Folke Ekström ahead of Lundholm, 27 December 1943 – 4 January 1944.
- Moscow (Championship of the City), won by Botvinnik ahead of Smyslov, December 1943 – January 1944.

== Matches ==
- Alexander Alekhine drew with Efim Bogoljubow (1 : 1) in Warsaw, General Government, start 27 March 1943.

== Team matches ==
- 25–26 April, Zagreb: Croatia vs. Bulgaria 8-8 (4½-3½, 3½-4½)

(Tekavčić ½0 Tsvetkov; Šubarić 00 Neikirch; Jerman ½1 Popov; Filipčić 10 Malchev; Jonke ½1 Karastoichev; Petek 1½ Kiprov; Kindij 01 Dimitrov; Licul 10 Kantardzhiev)

- 22–25 May, Russe/Gorgevo: Bulgaria vs. Romania result unknown

== Births ==
- 9 March – Bobby Fischer in Chicago, American GM and World Champion 1972–1975
- 22 March – Luben Spasov, Bulgarian GM
- 31 March – Bernard Zuckerman in Brooklyn, American IM
- 10 April – Włodzimierz Schmidt in Poznań, Polish GM, seven time Polish Champion
- 13 April – Tim Krabbé, Dutch chess player and writer
- 14 April – Ivan Nemet, Swiss GM
- 18 May – Gennadi Sosonko in Troitsk, Dutch GM
- 4 July – Orestes Rodriguez Vargas, Spanish GM
- 6 August – Helmut Pfleger, German GM
- 9 August – Lubomir Kavalek in Prague, Czech/American GM
- 23 September – Mark Tseitlin in Leningrad, Israeli GM
- 22 October – Ricardo Calvo, Spanish chess player and historian
- 21 November – Peter Lee, 1965 British Champion

== Deaths ==
- Henryk Pogorieły murdered by the Nazis in the Pawiak prison, Warsaw, the General Government.
- Abram Rabinovich died of starvation in Moscow, Russia.
- Alexander Romanovsky died in Russia.
- Vasily Osipovich Smyslov died in Russia.
- Edward Gerstenfeld died in Russia.
- Emmanuel Sapira died in Belgium.
- Gunnar Friedemann died in Estonia.
- Mirko Bröder died in Serbia.
- 9 February – Gunnar Gundersen, Australian master, died in Melbourne.
- 16 February – Abram Szpiro, Polish master, murdered in Auschwitz.
- 17 February – Léon Monosson, French master, murdered in Auschwitz.
- 28 March – Kārlis Bētiņš, died in Riga, Latvia. Behting variation.
- 13 May – Adrián García Conde died in London, England.
- 16 August – Stasch Mlotkowski died in Gloucester City, New Jersey, USA.
- 26 August – Vladimirs Petrovs died as a political prisoner in a Soviet labor camp in Kotlas, Russia.
- 29 September – Karl Berndtsson died in Sweden.
- 17 October – Jan Kotrč died in Vlachovo Březí, Bohemia.
- 15 November – Salo Landau murdered in a Nazi concentration camp in Gräditz, Silesia (then Germany, now Poland).
- December – Heinrich Wolf, Austrian master, murdered by the Nazis.
- December – Isaak Mazel, Belarusian master, died in Tashkent, Uzbekistan.
