= 1917 in chess =

Events in chess in 1917:

== Chess events in brief ==
- Seventh Triberg chess tournament - last tournament played by the "Russian" internees, held in Triberg im Schwarzwald, Germany, during World War I. The event was won jointly by Ilya Rabinovich and Alexey Selezniev ahead of Efim Bogoljubow and Samuil Weinstein. After the war, a Ukrainian master Bogoljubow remained in Triberg, where he married a local woman and spent the rest of his life in Germany, settling permanently in 1926.

== Tournaments ==
- Vienna (the 8th Leopold Trebitsch Memorial Tournament) (Triangular), won by Carl Schlechter ahead of Milan Vidmar and Arthur Kaufmann, 1916/17.
- Łódź won by Akiba Rubinstein ahead of Gersz Salwe and Teodor Regedziński, 1916/17.
- Łódź (Quadrangular), won by G. Salwe, 1916/17.
- Brno won by Julius Brach.
- Budapest won by Gyula Breyer followed by Zsigmond Barász, Károly Sterk, Kornél Havasi and Johannes Esser.
- Warsaw won by A. Rubinstein ahead of Moishe Lowtzky, Zdzisław Belsitzmann and Alexander Flamberg.
- Triberg (Quadrangular) won by Ilya Rabinovich and Alexey Selezniev.
- Berlin won by Walter John and Paul Johner.
- Paris won by Arnold Aurbach ahead of Adolphe Silbert.
- The Hague won by Jan Willem te Kolsté and Gerard Oskam.
- Scheveningen won by George Salto Fontein and G. Oskam ahead of Max Marchand and Rudolf Loman.
- Utrecht won by H. van Hartingsvelt and H.S. van Linschoten.
- New York City (Manhattan Chess Club Championship), won by Abraham Kupchik.
- Rochester (New York State Championship) won by Oscar Chajes ahead of H.M. Philips.
- Lexington (the 18th Western Chess Association), won by Edward Lasker ahead of Jackson Whipps Showalter and W. Winter, finished 25 August.
- Havana (Triangular), won by C.S. Howell ahead of Juan Corzo.
- Buenos Aires won by Rolando Illa and C.M. Portela.
- Christiania (the 10th Nordic Chess Championship), won by Gustaf Nyholm ahead of Karl Berndtsson.
- Stockholm (Swedish Chess Championship) won by Otto von Löwenborg and Anton Olson ahead of K. Berndtsson and G. Nyholm.
- Grenaa (the 8th Danish Chess Championship), won by Egil Jacobsen.
- London (the 28th London championship), won jointly by Philip Walsingham Sergeant, E. Macdonald and G.E. Wainwright, ahead of Edward Guthlac Sergeant and Theodor Germann, 1917/18.
- The Hague won by G.S. Fontein ahead of Alexander Rueb, 1917/18.
- Łódź won by T. Regedziński ahead of Samuel Factor and G. Salwe, 1917/18.
- Vienna (the 9th Leopold Trebitsch Memorial Tournament) (Quadrangular), won by M. Vidmar ahead of Savielly Tartakower, C. Schlechter and Lajos Asztalos, 1917/18.

== Matches ==
- Otto Löwenborg won against Anton Olson (3 : 2) in Stockholm.
- Gustaf Nyholm defeated Karl Berndtsson (3.5 : 1.5) in Gothenburg.
- Gustaf Nyholm beat Otto Löwenborg (4 : 1) in Stockholm.

== Births ==
- 19 March - László Szabó born in Budapest, Hungary. 9-time HUN-ch. GM 1950.
- 11 June - Romanas Arlauskas born in Kaunas, Lithuania. GMC 1965.
- 24 June - César Boutteville born in Thinh Hao, Vietnam, 6-time FRA-ch.
- 20 July - Luis Augusto Sánchez born in Columbia, 6-time COL-ch. IM 1951.
- 14 November - Stig Lundholm born in Luleå, Sweden. SWE-ch 1944, IMC 1983.
- 27 November - Haije Kramer born in the Netherlands. Dutch IM 1954.

== Deaths ==
- 19 January - Walter Gledhill died in Harrogate, England. Gledhill Attack.
- 17 March - James Alexander Porterfield Rynd died in Dublin, Ireland.
- 17 March - Franz Brentano died in Zurich, Switzerland.
- 16 July - Vincenz Hruby died in Trieste, Italy.
- 17 July - Arturo Reggio died in Milan, Italy.
