= Rilton Cup =

Swedish chess tournament

The Rilton Cup is a chess tournament that takes place annually, between the end of the year and the beginning of the next, in Stockholm, Sweden. The tournament is named after the Swedish doctor and chess player Tore Rilton. Its first edition took place in 1971/1972 with Jan Timman being the winner. It uses a Swiss-system tournament format.

== History ==
In 1971, Tore Rilton sent a donation to the organisers of the Stockholm Open chess tournament, with the instructions to use them to "organise a strong chess tournament". Due to this donation the event was named Rilton Cup and its first edition took place in 1971/1972. This inaugural version of the tournament was won by Jan Timman with 7.5 points; Walter Browne finished 2nd with 7 points and Einar Hatlebakk 3rd with 6.5. After Rilton's death, the Rilton Cup continued to be funded by Dr. Tore Rilton's Memorial Fund.

The Rilton Cup's 50th edition was to be played in 2020/2021, however it was postponed due to the COVID-19 pandemic. In its place, an invitational knockout tournament, the Rilton Winners' Cup, was held. The tournament took place on chess.com, with 16 participants. The time control for the matches was 15+10, and 5+3 for the tiebreaks. Krishnan Sasikiran won the event by defeating 2—0 the runner-up, Aleksandr Shimanov in the finals. The Rilton Cup's 50th edition was cancelled again in 2021-2022 and was postponed for 2022–2023.

The 50th edition of Rilton Cup took place from 22 December 2022 to 5 January 2023. This edition of the tournament was also the first international tournament eligible for the 2023 FIDE Circuit. Pranesh M won the tournament with 8 points in 9 rounds, scoring his final GM norm, with Kaan Kucusar finishing 2nd and Nikita Meshkovs 3rd, both with 7 points.

== Winners ==
No.	Year	Winner	Points
1	1971/1972	Jan Timman	7½ (9)
2	1972/1973	Jan Timman	7½ (9)
3	1973/1974	István Bilek	7 (9)
4	1974/1975	Heikki Westerinen	7½ (9)
5	1975/1976	Börje Jansson	7½ (9)
6	1976/1977	Sergio Mariotti	7½ (9)
7	1977/1978	Börje Jansson	7½ (9)
8	1978/1979	Harry Schüssler	7½ (9)
9	1979/1980	Konstanty Kaiszauri	7½ (9)
10	1980/1981	Axel Ornstein	7½ (9)
11	1981/1982	Lars-Åke Schneider	7 (9)
12	1982/1983	Ralf Åkesson	7 (9)
13	1983/1984	Axel Ornstein	7 (9)
14	1984/1985	Caspar Carleson	6½ (9)
15	1985/1986	Michael Wiedenkeller	7 (9)
16	1986/1987	Juan Manuel Bellón López	6½ (9)
17	1987/1988	Mikhail Gurevich	7 (9)
18	1988/1989	Ilia Smirin	7 (9)
19	1989/1990	Tom Wedberg	7 (9)
20	1990/1991	Alexey Vyzmanavin	8 (9)
21	1991/1992	Margeir Pétursson	7½ (9)
22	1992/1993	Andrei Kharlov	7½ (9)
23	1993/1994	Lars Bo Hansen	7½ (9)
24	1994/1995	Michał Krasenkow	7½ (9)
25	1995/1996	Michał Krasenkow	7½ (9)
26	1996/1997	Joel Benjamin	7 (9)
27	1997/1998	Igor Khenkin	7½ (9)
28	1998/1999	Mikhail Ulibin	7½ (9)
29	1999/2000	Sergey Ivanov	7½ (9)
30	2000/2001	Yuri Yakovich	7 (9)
31	2001/2002	Evgeny Agrest	7 (9)
32	2002/2003	Jonas Barkhagen	7½ (9)
33	2003/2004	Ralf Åkesson	7 (9)
34	2004/2005	Sergey Volkov	7 (9)
35	2005/2006	Eduardas Rozentalis	7 (9)
36	2006/2007	Robert Fontaine	7½ (9)
37	2007/2008	Radosław Wojtaszek	6½ (9)
38	2008/2009	Radosław Wojtaszek	7 (9)
39	2009/2010	Eduardas Rozentalis	6½ (9)
40	2010/2011	Sergey Volkov	8 (9)
41	2011/2012	Aleksandr Shimanov	7½ (9)
42	2012/2013	Michał Krasenkow	7½ (9)
43	2013/2014	Jon Ludvig Hammer	7½ (9)
44	2014/2015	Jon Ludvig Hammer	7 (9)
45	2015/2016	Maxim Rodshtein	8 (9)
46	2016/2017	Krishnan Sasikiran	7½ (9)
47	2017/2018	Kirill Alekseenko	7½ (9)
48	2018/2019	Tamir Nabaty	8 (9)
49	2019/2020	Elshan Moradiabadi	7 (9)
(Note: In 2020/2021 the Rilton Cup was cancelled due to the COVID-19 pandemic, however a special online edition, the Rilton Winners' Cup took place.)	2020/2021	Krishnan Sasikiran	2-0 (KO)
50	2022/2023	Pranesh M	8 (9)
51	2023/2024	Vitaly Sivuk	7½ (9)
52	2024/2025	Bassem Amin	7½ (9)
53	2025/2026	Xu Xiangyu	8 (9)
