= Allan Nilsson =

Swedish chess player

Allan Nilsson (18 May 1899 – 4 September 1949) was a Swedish chess master.

Nilsson was born in Gothenburg. He was Swedish champion in 1924–1929, and played four matches for the title, all in Gothenburg. He drew a match with Gustaf Nyholm (2.5 : 2.5) in 1921, won against Nyholm (3 : 1) in 1924, drew with Gösta Stoltz (2.5 : 2.5) in 1927, and lost to Gideon Ståhlberg (0 : 3) in 1929.

He tied for 2nd-3rd, behind Paul Johner, at Göteborg 1920, shared 1st with Anton Olson at Uppsala 1923, and took 3rd at Copenhagen 1924 (Nordic Championship, Aron Nimzowitsch won).

Nilsson represented Sweden in the 1st Chess Olympiad at London 1927, and tied for 9-11th in the Amateur World Championship (Max Euwe won), which took place during the 2nd Chess Olympiad at The Hague 1928.

Nilsson died in Gothenburg.
