= Otto Löwenborg =

Swedish chess player (1888–1969)

(Knut) Otto (Reinhold) Löwenborg (Loewenborg, Loevenborg, Løwenborg, Løvenborg) (2 March 1888 – December 1969) was a Swedish chess master.

In January 1912, he won a simultaneous exhibition game against Frank James Marshall in Stockholm. He took 3rd at Stockholm 1913 (Boris Kostić won), took 9th at Jungbunzlau (Mladá Boleslav) 1913 (Karel Opočenský won), tied for 2nd–4th at Copenhagen 1916 (the 9th Nordic Championship, Paul Johner won), took 8th at Stockholm 1916, took 6th at Kristiania 1917 (the 10th Nordic-ch, Gustaf Nyholm won), shared 1st with Anton Olson and won a match against him (3–2) at Stockholm 1917, and finally lost a match for the Swedish Champion title to Nyholm (1–4) at Stockholm 1917.

He tied for 7–8th at Göteborg 1918 (Karl Berndtsson won), tied for 4–6th at Göteborg 1919 (the 11th Nordic-ch, Rudolf Spielmann and Olson won), and tied for 4–8th at Copenhagen 1924 (the 12th Nordic-ch, Aron Nimzowitsch won).
