= Bengt Ekenberg =

Swedish chess player (1912–1986)

Bengt August Edvard Ekenberg (27 June 1912 in Gothenburg – 17 August 1986) was a Swedish chess master.

He twice won the Swedish Chess Championship at Malmö 1943 and Örnsköldsvik 1962. In other tournaments, he tied for 7–8th at Örebro 1935 (Alexander Alekhine won), took 2nd, behind Ernst Larsson, at Borås 1936, took 2nd, behind Gösta Stoltz, at Stockholm 1938, tied for 5–6th at Stockholm 1943/44 (Folke Ekström won), took 3rd, behind Stig Lundholm and Paul Keres, at Linköping 1944 (SWE-ch).

He represented Sweden in 3rd unofficial Chess Olympiad at Munich 1936 and the 8th Chess Olympiad at Buenos Aires 1939. He also played in friendly matches: Sweden vs. Denmark (1948, 1949, 1953), Finland (1948), Norway (1948), Yugoslavia (1950), and Poland (1967).

He twice won the Swedish Senior Chess Championship in 1978 and 1979.
