= Thomas Ernst (chess player) =

Swedish chess grandmaster (born 1960)

Personal information
- Born: August 17, 1960 (age 66) Uppsala, Sweden

Chess career
- Country: Sweden
- Title: Grandmaster (1991)
- Peak rating: 2570 (July 1992)

Thomas Ernst (born 17 August 1960) is a Swedish chess Grandmaster. He won the Swedish Chess Championship in 1993.

== Career ==
Ernst was one of Sweden's top chess players from the early 1980s through the late 1990s. He is an eight-time medalist at the Swedish Chess Championship, winning the national title in 1993, finishing as runner-up twice (1985, 1988), and taking bronze five times (1982, 1983, 1984, 1986, 1996).

In 1987, he won the Zonal tournament in Gausdal, qualifying for the 1987 Subotica Interzonal, where he placed 12th. FIDE awarded him the Grandmaster title in 1991.

=== Team chess ===
Ernst represented Sweden in three Chess Olympiads in 1984, 1988, and 1992. He also played for Sweden at the 1992 European Team Chess Championship in Debrecen, helping the team secure a 5th-place finish.

=== Tournament results ===
- 1983: Tied for 3rd place at the Rilton Cup in Stockholm and 2nd–3rd place in Eksjö.
- 1985: Shared 2nd place at the Copenhagen Open.
- 1990: Tied for 1st place at the Reykjavik Open alongside Lev Polugaevsky, Sergey Dolmatov, Rafael Vaganian, and Yasser Seirawan.
- 1991: 2nd place in Gausdal behind Alexei Shirov.
- 1992: Won open tournaments in Stockholm and Malmö.
- 2000/01: Shared 1st place at the Rilton Cup with Yury Yakovich.
- 2001: Co-winner in Örebro alongside Stellan Brynell.
- 2002: 2nd place at the Excelsior Cup in Gothenburg.
- 2004: Tied for 2nd place in Copenhagen behind Jonny Hector.

He reached his peak FIDE rating of 2570 in July 1992, when he was ranked 2nd in Sweden behind Ulf Andersson and tied for 78th–88th in the world.
