= Lars-Åke Schneider =

Swedish chess player

Personal information
- Born: 10 July 1955 (age 70) Stockholm, Sweden

Chess career
- Country: Sweden
- Title: International Master (1976)
- Peak rating: 2475 (July 1988)

Lars-Åke Schneider (born 10 July 1955) is a Swedish chess International Master (IM) (1976), four time Swedish Chess Championship winner (1979, 1982, 1983, 1986).

== Biography ==
From the mid-1970s to the mid-1990s, Lars-Åke Schneider belonged among the top Swedish chess players. He four times won Swedish Chess Championship: 1979, 1982, 1983 and 1986. Also Lars-Åke Schneider twice won silver medals in the national championship (1990, 1991) and bronze medals once (1989).

Lars-Åke Schneider successes on the International Chess tournaments include, among others:

- 1st place (1982) and four times shared 1st place (1978, 1981, 1985, 1987) in Rilton Cup tournament in Stockholm,
- 1st place (1980) and twice shared 1st place (1979, together with Axel Ornstein and 1982, together with Lars Karlsson) in Eksjö,
- shared 2nd place in Esbjerg (1977, tournament The North Sea Cup, after Jens Kristiansen, together with William Hartston),
- shared 1st place in Netanya (1977, together with Khosro Harandi),
- shared 1st place in Roskilde (1978, together with Heikki Westerinen),
- 1st place in Gladsaxe (1979),
- 1st place in Oslo (1980),
- 2nd place in Hamburg (1981),
- 3rd place in Esbjerg (1983, Nordic Chess Championship, after Curt Hansen and Tom Wedberg).

Lars-Åke Schneider played for Sweden in the Chess Olympiads:

- In 1976, at second reserve board in the 22nd Chess Olympiad in Haifa (+4, =1, -2),
- In 1978, at third board in the 23rd Chess Olympiad in Buenos Aires (+3, =5, -3),
- In 1980, at third board in the 24th Chess Olympiad in La Valletta (+3, =3, -3),
- In 1982, at fourth board in the 25th Chess Olympiad in Lucerne (+3, =2, -3),
- In 1984, at second reserve board in the 26th Chess Olympiad in Thessaloniki (+1, =3, -2).

Lars-Åke Schneider played for Sweden in the European Team Chess Championship:

- In 1980, at third board in the 7th European Team Chess Championship in Skara (+1, =4, -2).

Lars-Åke Schneider played for Sweden in the Nordic Chess Cup:

- In 1975, at third board in the 6th Nordic Chess Cup in Hindås (+1, =1, -3),
- In 1976, at fourth board in the 7th Nordic Chess Cup in Bremen (+1, =1, -3),
- In 1983, at second board in the 9th Nordic Chess Cup in Oslo (+2, =4, -1) and won team bronze medal.

In 1976, he was awarded the FIDE International Master (IM) title.
