= Olof Kinnmark =

Swedish chess player

Olof Kinnmark (29 March 1897 – 18 February 1970) was a Swedish chess master.

He won a tournament at Trollhättan 1925 (Swedish Chess Championship), took 3rd at Karlskrona 1932, and took 12th in Nordic Chess Championship at Copenhagen 1934 (Aron Nimzowitsch won). Kinnmark represented Sweden in 3rd unofficial Chess Olympiad at Munich 1936 (+4 =3 –6).

During World War II, he participated in European Individual Chess Championship (Europameisterschaft, Wertungsturnier – Qualification Tournament, Gösta Danielsson won) at Munich 1942, and Swedish championships at Lidköping 1944 (Stig Lundholm won). After the war, he played at Helsinki 1947 (zonal, Gösta Stoltz and Eero Böök won).
