= Hans Tikkanen =

Swedish chess grandmaster (born 1985)

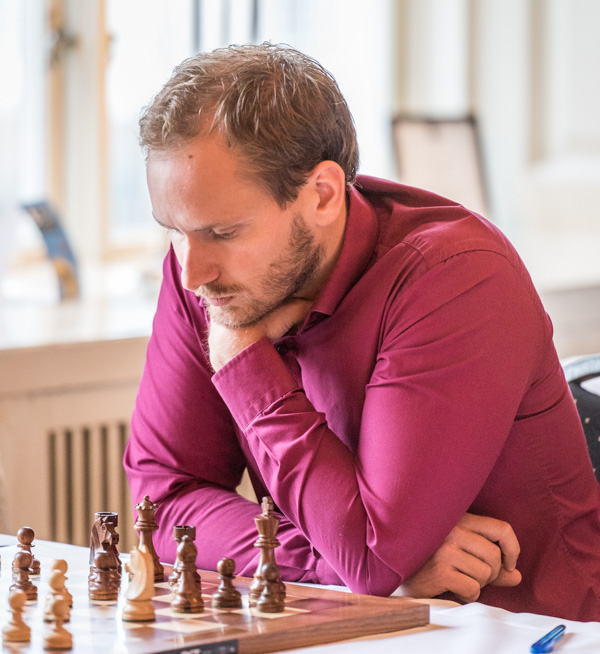
- Hans Tikkanen, 2016

Personal information
- Born: Hans Christian Tikkanen; 6 February 1985 (age 41) Karlstad, Sweden

Chess career
- Country: Sweden
- Title: Grandmaster (2010)
- FIDE rating: 2475 (July 2026)
- Peak rating: 2596 (July 2011)

Hans Christian Tikkanen (born 6 February 1985 in Karlstad) is a Swedish chess grandmaster. He is a five-time Swedish Chess Champion.

== Chess career ==
He won the Swedish Junior Chess Championship in 2002. In 2010 he won the Lithuanian University of Agriculture Cup in Kaunas and tied for 3rd–6th with Sarunas Sulskis, Tiger Hillarp Persson and Kaido Kulaots at Borup. In 2012, he came second in the Group C of the Tata Steel Chess Tournament in Wijk aan Zee, and shared first place with Slavko Cicak and Emanuel Berg at the Västerås Open. He played for Sweden in the European Team Chess Championships of 2005 (in team 3), 2011 and 2013.

In the January 2012 FIDE list, he had an Elo rating of 2549, making him Sweden's seventh highest ranked player.

Tikkanen is co-author with Axel Smith of the chess training book The Woodpecker Method (Quality Chess, 2018).

== Football career ==
Alongside his chess career, Tikkanen played football in the Swedish Division 5 Sydvästra B club Hallands Nations FF.

== Personal life ==
Tikkanen is of Finnish descent through his Finnish-born father.
