= Nils Bergkvist =

Swedish chess player

Nils Valentin Bergkvist or Nils Bergqvist (born 13 August 1900 in Södertälje– died ?) was a Swedish chess master.

He shared first in the national tournament at Lund 1933, took 5th at Stockholm 1937 (Reuben Fine won), played a match with Salo Landau at Stockholm 1937, twice tied for 3rd-4th, with Ernst Larsson at Kalmar 1938 (Erik Lundin won), and with Allan Bergkvist at Stockholm 1938 (Gösta Stoltz won), tied for 2nd with Rudolf Spielmann, behind Gideon Ståhlberg, at Stockholm 1939 (Swedish Chess Championship), and won at Stockholm 1940.

He thrice represented Sweden in Chess Olympiads (3rd unofficial Chess Olympiad at Munich 1936, the 8th Chess Olympiad at Buenos Aires 1939, and the 9th Chess Olympiad at Dubrovnik 1950). Playing on the fourth board, he won individual bronze medal in 1950.
