= Bergqvist =

Bergqvist or Bergkvist is a surname of Swedish origin.Notable people with the surname include:

- Åke Bergqvist (1900–1975), Swedish sailor who competed in the 1932 Summer Olympics
- Allan Bergkvist (1908–1985), Swedish chess master
- Erik Bergqvist (1891–1954), Swedish water polo player and freestyle swimmer
- Jonas Bergqvist, Swedish retired ice hockey right winger
- Kajsa Bergqvist, Swedish former high jumper
- Kjell Bergqvist, Swedish actor
- Maj-Britt Bergqvist, Swedish sprint canoer who competed in the late 1930s.
- Nils Bergkvist, (1900-unknown), Swedish chess master
- Olof Bergqvist (1862–1940), Swedish bishop
- Per-Ragnar Bergkvist, Swedish ice hockey player
- Sven Bergqvist (1914–1996), Swedish bandy, ice hockey and football player.

== See also ==
- Bergquist
- Berquist
- Justin Burquist, American filmmaker
