= Seo Jung-min =

Swedish chess player (born 2002)

Personal information
- Born: May 25, 2002 (age 24)

Chess career
- Country: Sweden
- Title: International Master (2021)
- FIDE rating: 2501 (November 2026)
- Peak rating: 2520 (October 2022)

Seo Jung-min is a Swedish chess player. He has been considered a "rising star" in the Swedish chess scene.

== Career ==
In July 2021, he won the Swedish Chess Championship by defeating Jonny Hector in the penultimate round and drawing against Tiger Hillarp Persson in the final round.

In September 2026, he played on board 2 for Sweden in the 46th Chess Olympiad, scoring 5/9 and achieving draws against grandmasters Shant Sargsyan, Szymon Gumularz, and David Navara.
