= Anton Olson =

Swedish chess player

Anton Olson (1881 - 1967) was a Swedish chess master.

He was Swedish Champion in 1921, and thrice played matches for the title, all in Stockholm. He lost a match to Gustaf Nyholm (1.5 : 3.5) in 1919, won against Nyholm (3 : 2) in 1921, and lost to Nyholm (1.5 : 3.5) in 1921.

He took 2nd, behind Boris Kostić, at Stockholm 1913; shared 1st with Otto Löwenborg and lost a match to him (2 : 3) at Stockholm 1917; tied for 1st-2nd with Rudolf Spielmann at Göteborg 1919 (Nordic Chess Championship; won at Malmö 1919; tied for 11-12th at Göteborg 1920 (Paul Johner won), shared 1st with Allan Nilsson at Uppsala 1923; tied for 4-8th at Copenhagen 1924 (Nordic-ch, Aron Nimzowitsch won), and took 8th at Oslo 1928 (Nordic-ch, Karl Berndtsson won).
