= Joel Fridlizius =

Swedish chess player

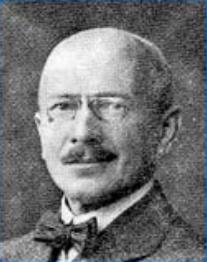
Fridlizius Joel in 1920

Joel Fridlizius (31 December 1869 – 6 January 1963) was a Swedish chess master.

He took 2nd, behind Jorgen Moeller, at Gothenburg 1901 (the 3rd Nordic Chess Championship), won ahead of Gustaf Nyholm at Gothenburg 1909 (B tournament), and tied for 7-9th but won games from Alexander Alekhine and Rudolf Spielmann at Stockholm 1912 (the 8th Nordic-ch).
