= Berquist =

Berquist is a surname, an americanized form of Swedish surname Bergquist. Notable people with the surname include:

- Emily Berquist, American historian
- Henry J. Berquist (1905–1990), American politician from Wisconsin
- Joy Berquist (1901–1942), American football player, lawyer and judge
- Marcus Berquist (1934 – November 2, 2010), American philosopher and academic
- Matt Berquist (born 1983), New Zealand rugby union footballer

== See also ==
- Bergqvist
