= Wahlbom =

Wahlbom is a Swedish surname. Notable people with the surname include:

- Carl Wahlbom (1810–1858), Swedish painter, illustrator, and sculptor
- Nils Wahlbom (1886–1937), Swedish film actor
- Magnus Wahlbom (born 1945), Swedish chess master
