= Ernst Larsson =

Swedish chess player

Ernst Larsson (1897–1963) was a Swedish chess master.

== Career ==
He won in the Swedish Chess Championship at Borås 1936. He also won against José Raúl Capablanca in a simultaneous game at Stockholm 1928, tied for 3rd-4th at Falun 1934, took 2nd, behind Gösta Danielsson, at Göteborg 1935 (Quadrangular), took 3rd at Härnösand 1935, tied for 3rd-4th at Kalmar 1938 (Erik Lundin won), and tied for 8-9th at Örebro 1938 (Gideon Ståhlberg won). In September 1935, he played in a match Sweden vs Germany (Scheveningen system) in Zoppot (Sopot), and took 5-6th individual result (3.5/8). In June 1938, playing in a match Germany vs. Scandinavia in Bremen, he lost to Carl Ahues (0.5–1.5).

== Olympics ==
He represented Sweden in the 6th Chess Olympiad at Warsaw 1935 (the reserve board), and in 3rd unofficial Chess Olympiad at Munich 1936 (the seventh board).
