= Nils Grandelius =

Swedish chess grandmaster (born 1993)

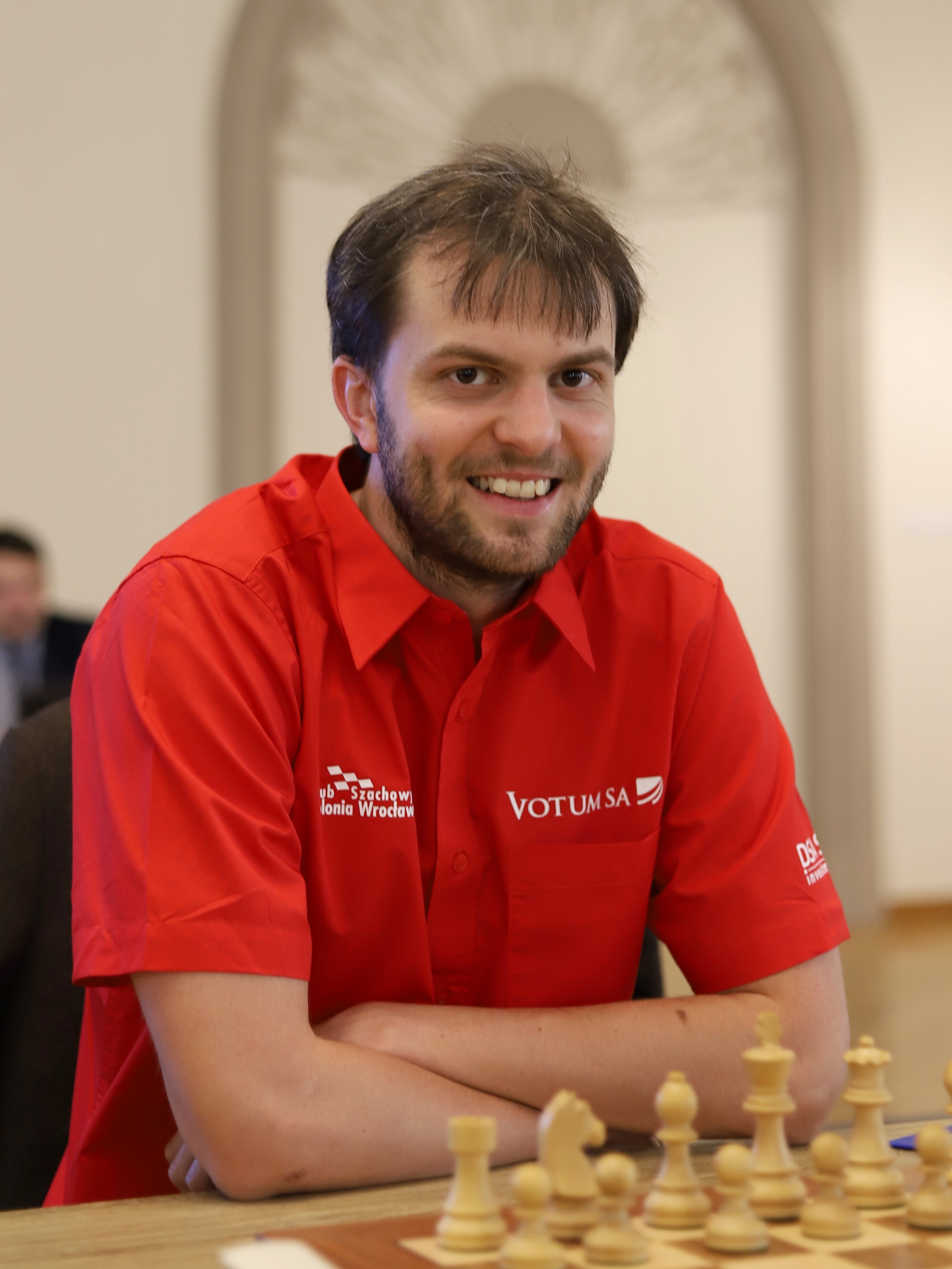
- Grandelius in 2021

Personal information
- Born: 3 June 1993 (age 33) Lund, Sweden

Chess career
- Country: Sweden
- Title: Grandmaster (2010)
- FIDE rating: 2603 (July 2026)
- Peak rating: 2694 (March 2019)
- Peak ranking: No. 44 (September 2019)

Nils Axel Grandelius (born 3 June 1993) is a Swedish chess grandmaster. He is the top ranked player of Sweden.

== Chess career ==
FIDE awarded him the titles FIDE Master, in 2007, International Master, in 2008, and Grandmaster in 2010.

In 2008, Grandelius tied for second place, placing fourth on countback, in the Under 16 section of the European Youth Chess Championships. In the same year, he took clear first place in the Olomouc Open in Czech Republic with a score of 6½ points from 9 games; thanks to this result, he also achieved his first norm required for the title Grandmaster (GM). In the following year's edition, he placed tied for first place with the same score, placing second on tiebreak. He also achieved his second GM norm. Grandelius achieved the GM title by earning his third and final norm in the 40th Bosna International Tournament in Sarajevo, in which he finished fifteenth, the first among juniors.

He took the bronze medal at the 2010 World Youth Chess Championships in the Under 18 category. The next year, Grandelius won the gold medal in the same age category at the European Youth Championships in Albena, Bulgaria.

In May 2012, he placed third in the 20th Sigeman & Co Chess Tournament in Malmö, behind the winner, Fabiano Caruana, and the runner-up, Peter Leko. Later that year, in August 2012, he ended in a tie for third in the World Junior Championship in Athens, placing fourth on tiebreak.

He has been trained by Evgenij Agrest since 2013.

In July 2015, he won the Swedish Chess Championship by defeating Emanuel Berg in a playoff match, after they both tied for first, scoring 6½/9 points. The following month, Grandelius won the 22nd Abu Dhabi Masters tournament, edging out on tiebreak Martyn Kravtsiv, Baadur Jobava, Alexander Areshchenko and Richárd Rapport.

In March 2016, Grandelius won a four-player tournament for the last place in the Norway Chess 2016 field, against Norwegian grandmasters Jon Ludvig Hammer and Aryan Tari, and Women's World Champion Hou Yifan. It was a double round-robin tournament, with the first leg being standard time control and the second leg with rapid time control (25 minutes+10 second-increment).

Grandelius was one of the seconds of Magnus Carlsen during the World Chess Championship match 2018.

In March 2019, Grandelius tied for first place with Vladislav Artemiev in the European Individual Championship, held in Skopje, scoring 8½/11 points. He took the silver medal on tiebreak.

Grandelius has been playing for the Swedish national team at the Chess Olympiads since 2010 and at the European Team Chess Championships since 2011. In 2019 he also took part in the World Team Chess Championship.

Grandelius was a second to Hikaru Nakamura for the FIDE Candidates Tournament 2024.
