= Börje Jansson (chess player) =

Swedish chess player (born 1942)

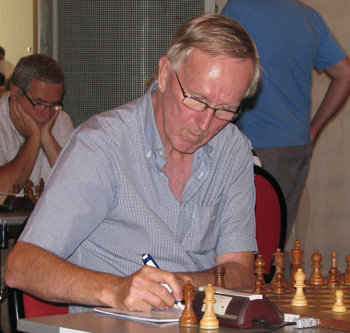

Personal information
- Born: 12 March 1942 (age 84) Tierp, Sweden

Chess career
- Country: Sweden
- Title: FIDE Master (2005)
- Peak rating: 2420 (January 1980)

Börje Jansson (born 12 March 1942) is a Swedish chess FIDE Master (2005) and two-time Swedish Chess Championship winner (1968, 1970).

== Biography ==
In 1959, Börje Jansson won the Swedish Junior Chess Championship. In the mid-1960s, he was one of the leading Swedish chess players. Börje Jansson participated in the finals of the Swedish Chess Championship many times and won eight medals: 2 gold (1968, 1970), 3 silver (1967, 1969, 1977) and 2 bronze (1965, 1972). In 1969, in Raach am Hochgebirge, he participated in a World Chess Championship Zonal tournament and ranked 10th.

Börje Jansson shared first place three times in the international chess tournaments Rilton Cup in Stockholm: 1973/74, 1975/76 and 1977/78. In the early 1980s, his chess activity decreased. In 2004, Börje Jansson won the Swedish Senior Chess Championship in the S60 age group. In 2006 and 2010, he won two chess tournaments in Uppsala.

Börje Jansson played for Sweden in the Chess Olympiads:

- in 1964, at the first reserve board in the 16th Chess Olympiad in Tel Aviv (+6, =1, -3),
- in 1966, at the fourth board in the 17th Chess Olympiad in Havana (+5, =7, -5),
- in 1968, at the first board in the 18th Chess Olympiad in Lugano (+1, =6, -5),
- in 1970, at the second board in the 19th Chess Olympiad in Siegen (+9, =4, -2),
- in 1972, at the second board in the 20th Chess Olympiad in Skopje (+4, =8, -4),
- in 1974, at the third board in the 21st Chess Olympiad in Nice (+6, =2, -5),
- in 1976, at the third board in the 22nd Chess Olympiad in Haifa (+3, =1, -4).

Börje Jansson played for Sweden in the European Team Chess Championship:

- in 1980, at the eighth board in the 7th European Team Chess Championship in Skara (+1, =1, -2).

Börje Jansson played for Sweden in the Clare Benedict Cup:

- in 1974, at the third board in the 21st Clare Benedict Cup in Cala Galdana (+1, =3, -3),
- in 1977, at the third board in the 22nd Clare Benedict Cup in Copenhagen (+1, =4, -2), winning a team bronze medal.

Börje Jansson played for Sweden in the Nordic Chess Cup:

- in 1970, at the first board in the 1st Nordic Chess Cup in Großenbrode (+1, =1, -1), winning team silver and individual gold medals,
- in 1971, at the second board in the 2nd Nordic Chess Cup in Großenbrode (+1, =1, -1), winning a team gold medal,
- in 1972, at the second board in the 3rd Nordic Chess Cup in Großenbrode (+1, =1, -2), winning a team gold medal,
- in 1973, at the third board in the 4th Nordic Chess Cup in Ribe (+1, =1, -3), winning team silver and individual gold medals,
- in 1975, at the second board in the 6th Nordic Chess Cup in Hindås (+4, =1, -0), winning an individual gold medal,
- in 1976, at the second board in the 7th Nordic Chess Cup in Bremen (+4, =1, -0), winning an individual gold medal,
- in 1977, at the third board in the 8th Nordic Chess Cup in Glücksburg (+2, =1, -2), winning a team gold medal.
