= Olof Sterner =

Swedish chess player

Personal information
- Born: 1914 Norrköping, Sweden
- Died: 30 September 1968 Stockholm, Sweden

Chess career
- Country: Sweden

Olof Sterner (1914 – 30 September 1968) was a Swedish chess player, Nordic Chess Championship winner (1957).

== Biography ==
Olof Sterner was one of the strongest chess players in Sweden in the 1950s. His main sporting achievement is the victory in the Nordic Chess Championship in 1957, which took place in the Helsinki. In 1963, he participated in Stockholm International Chess Tournament. Participant of major International Chess Tournaments in Dresden (1956) and Hastings (1957/1958).

Olof Sterner played for Sweden in the Chess Olympiad:

- In 1958, at third board in the 13th Chess Olympiad in Munich (+4, =6, -4).

Olof Sterner played for Sweden in the European Team Chess Championship preliminaries:

- In 1961, at sixth board in the 2nd European Team Chess Championship preliminaries (+0, =2, -1).
