= Gösta Danielsson =

Swedish chess player

Gösta Erik Vilhelm Danielsson (24 June 1912, Helenelund – 17 October 1978, Knivsta) was a Swedish chess master.

== Career ==
He took 4th at Stockholm 1934 (Erik Lundin won), tied for 3rd-4th at Falun 1934 (Lundin and Olof Kinnmark won), tied for 3rd-4th, behind Paul Felix Schmidt and Paul Keres, at Tallinn (Reval) 1935, and won at Gothenburg 1935 (Quadrangular).

In September 1935, he played at a match Sweden vs Germany (Scheveningen system) in Zoppot (Sopot). In 1937, he tied for 3rd-4th in Stockholm (Reuben Fine won). In 1939, he took 6th in Alingsås (Gideon Ståhlberg won).

Danielsson represented Sweden in Chess Olympiads:

- In 1935, at fourth board in the 6th Chess Olympiad in Warsaw (+12 -1 =6)
- In 1936, at fourth board in 3rd unofficial Chess Olympiad in Munich (+9 -2 =9)
- In 1937, at fourth board in 7th Chess Olympiad in Stockholm (+12 -2 =4)
- In 1939, at fourth board in 8th Chess Olympiad in Buenos Aires (+7 -3 =5)
- In 1952, at second reserve board in 10th Chess Olympiad in Helsinki (+1 -2 =3)

He won individual gold medal at Stockholm 1937, and three silver medals (team and individual at Warsaw 1935 and individual at Munich 1936).

In September 1942, he won in Munich (1st European Championship – Europameisterschaft, Wertungsturnier – Qualification Tournament).

He was a Swedish Champion in 1955.
