= Manne Joffe =

Swedish chess player

Personal information
- Born: 27 March 1928 (age 98)

Chess career
- Country: Sweden
- Title: International Correspondence Chess Master (1992)

Manne Joffe (born 27 March 1928) is a Swedish chess player, Nordic Chess Championship winner (1963).

== Biography ==
Manne Joffe was one of the strongest chess players in Sweden in the 1950-1960s. His main sporting achievement is the victory in the Nordic Chess Championship in 1963, which took place in the Odense (Joffe shared 1st-2nd places with Bjørn Brinck-Claussen).

Manne Joffe played for Sweden in the Chess Olympiad:

- In 1956, at first reserve board in the 12th Chess Olympiad in Moscow (+6, =1, -2).
