= Inge Johansson (chess player) =

Swedish chess player (1916–1966)

Personal information
- Born: 8 October 1916 Malmö, Sweden
- Died: 20 September 1966 (aged 49)

Chess career
- Country: Sweden

John Inge Valfrid Johansson (8 October 1916 – 20 September 1966) was a Swedish chess player, Swedish Chess Championship winner (1958).

== Biography ==
In the 1950s Inge Johansson was one of Sweden's leading chess players. During 1940-1958 he was 13 times (or 15, depending on which events to count) champion of Malmö. In Swedish Chess Championships Inge Johansson has won gold (1958) medal.

Inge Johansson played for Sweden in the Chess Olympiads:

- In 1950, at second board in the 9th Chess Olympiad in Dubrovnik (+5, =2, -5),
- In 1952, at reserve board in the 10th Chess Olympiad in Helsinki (+3, =3, -2),
- In 1958, at second board in the 13th Chess Olympiad in Munich (+2, =2, -7).

Inge Johansson suffered from a stroke on 16 September 1966, and died four days later.
