= Åke Stenborg =

Swedish chess player (1926–2010)

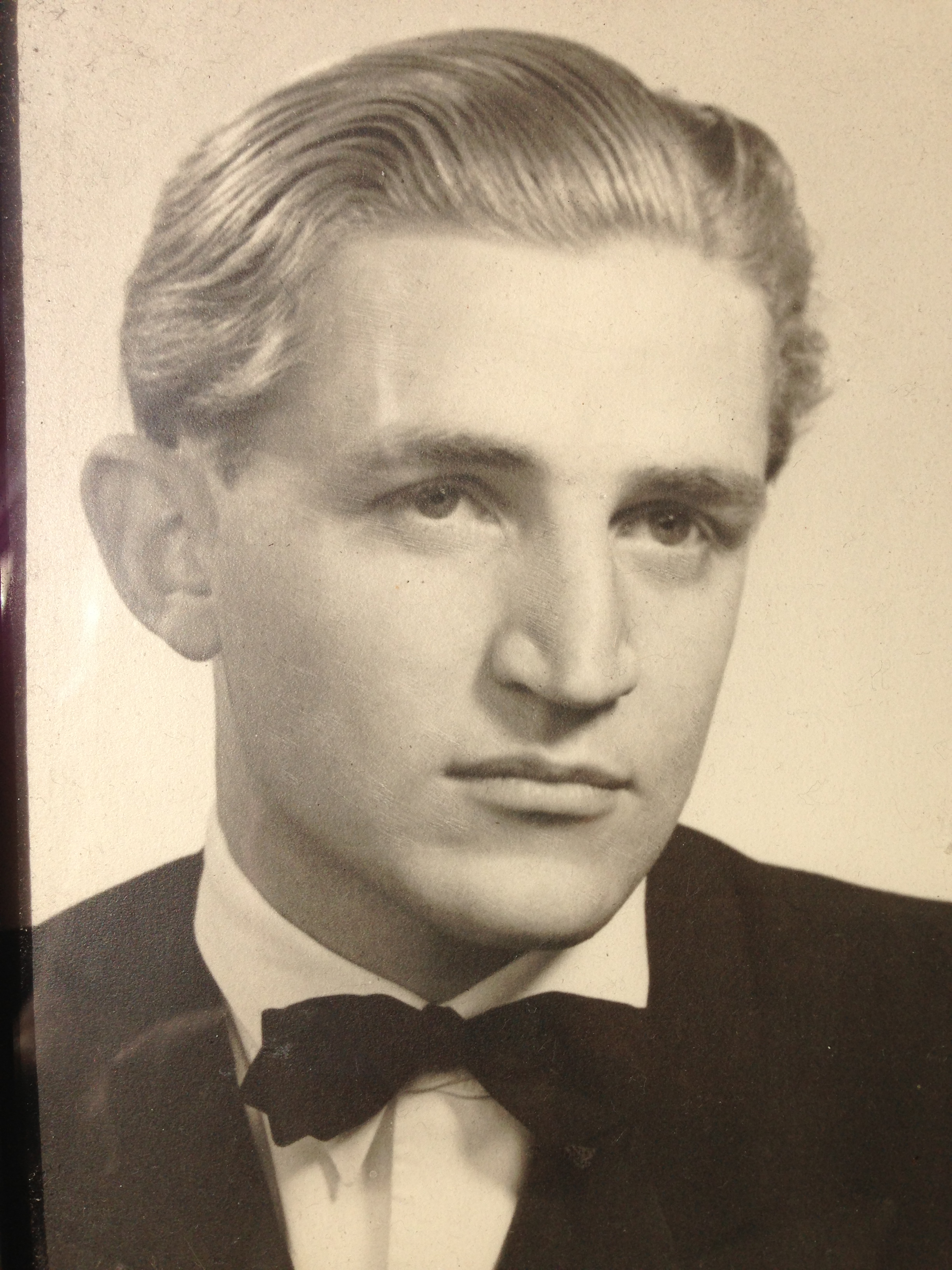

Personal information
- Born: 27 February 1926 Torshälla, Sweden
- Died: 4 April 2010 (aged 84) Eskilstuna, Sweden

Chess career
- Country: Sweden

Åke Stenborg (27 February 1926 – 4 April 2010) was a Swedish chess player who won the Swedish Chess Championship in 1956.

== Biography ==
Åke Stenborg was born in the town of Torshälla, but he lived most of his life in Eskilstuna. He was a multiple champion of the city chess club. He won the gold medal at the 1956 Swedish Chess Championships. Despite his achievements, Stenborg was an amateur player who competed in his free time.

He received an engineering education. He worked first for the manufacturing company ASEA, and then for the tool brand Bahco. For some time he represented the interests of Bahco in Santa Fe, Argentina.

Stenborg played for Sweden in two Chess Olympiads:

- In 1950, at second reserve board in the 9th Chess Olympiad in Dubrovnik (+3, =0, -3),
- In 1956, at second board in the 12th Chess Olympiad in Moscow (+2, =9, -3).

He played for Sweden in one edition of the European Team Chess Championship preliminaries:

- In 1961, at seventh board in the 2nd European Team Chess Championship preliminaries (+0, =1, -3).
