= Kristian Sköld =

Swedish chess player

Personal information
- Born: September 26, 1911 Stockholm, Sweden
- Died: May 15, 1988 (aged 76)

Chess career
- Country: Sweden

Kristian Sköld (26 September 1911 – 15 May 1988) was a Swedish chess player, four-time Swedish Chess Championship winner (1949, 1950, 1959, 1963).

== Biography ==
From the late 1940s to the mid 1960s, Kristian Sköld was one of Sweden's leading chess players. In Swedish Chess Championships he has won four gold (1949, 1950, 1959, 1963) and bronze (1962) medals. Kristian Sköld participated in FIDE European Zonal tournament in 1951. He regularly participated in the New Year tournaments in Stockholm.

Kristian Sköld played for Sweden in the Chess Olympiads:

- In 1950, at first board in the 9th Chess Olympiad in Dubrovnik (+4, =4, -4),
- In 1952, at fourth board in the 10th Chess Olympiad in Helsinki (+4, =6, -2),
- In 1956, at third board in the 12th Chess Olympiad in Moscow (+3, =7, -3),
- In 1960, at reserve board in the 14th Chess Olympiad in Leipzig (+5, =3, -3),
- In 1962, at second board in the 15th Chess Olympiad in Varna (+3, =5, -4),
- In 1964, at third board in the 16th Chess Olympiad in Tel Aviv (+3, =2, -5),
- In 1968, at second reserve board in the 18th Chess Olympiad in Lugano (+3, =4, -6).

Kristian Sköld played for Sweden in the European Team Chess Championship preliminaries:

- In 1961, at second board (+1, =1, -2),
- In 1961, at third board (+0, =4, -1).

Kristian Sköld played for Sweden in the Nordic Chess Cup:

- In 1970, at five board (+1, =2, -0) and won team gold and individual silver medals.
