= Allan Bergkvist =

Swedish chess player

Personal information
- Born: 10 July 1908
- Died: 13 September 1985 (aged 77)

Chess career
- Country: Sweden

Allan Bergkvist (10 July 1908 – 13 September 1985) was a Swedish chess player.

== Biography ==
Allan Bergkvist was one of Sweden's strongest chess players from the 1930s to the 1950s. He was a participant of the official and unofficial Swedish Chess Championships. His best result in this tournament was shared 3rd - 4th place with Nils Bergkvist in 1938.

Allan Bergkvist played for Sweden in the Chess Olympiad:

- In 1950, at third board in the 9th Chess Olympiad in Dubrovnik (+3, =2, -7).
