= Harry Schüssler =

Swedish chess grandmaster (born 1957)

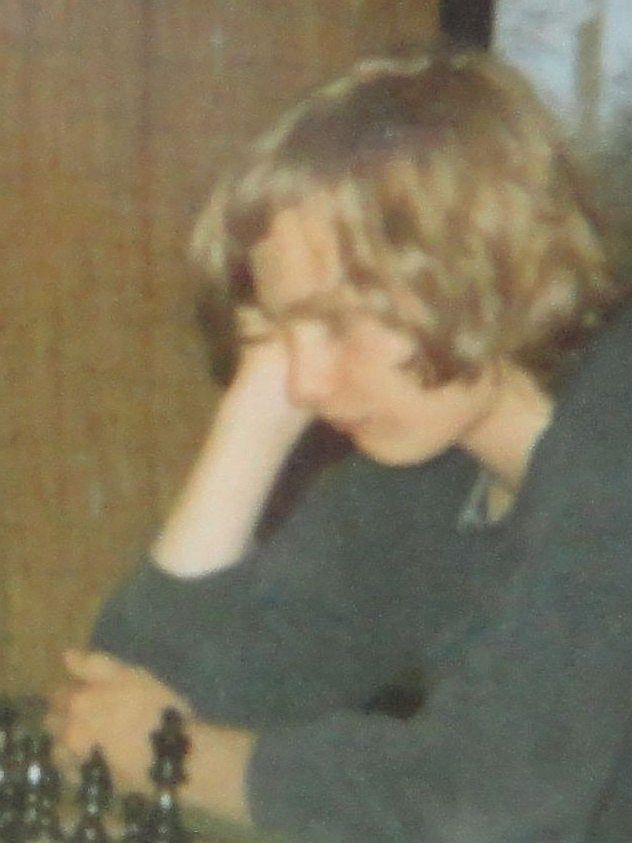
- Harry Schüssler in 1979

Personal information
- Born: 24 June 1957 (age 69) Malmö, Sweden

Chess career
- Country: Sweden
- Title: Grandmaster (1988)
- FIDE rating: 2410 (July 2026)
- Peak rating: 2598 (July 1989)

Harry Schüssler (born 24 June 1957) is a Swedish chess Grandmaster (GM) (1988), two-time Swedish Chess Championship winner (1976, 1978), Chess Olympiad individual silver medal winner (1980).

== Biography ==
From the mid-1970s to the end of the 1980s, Harry Schüssler belonged among the top Swedish chess players. He achieved his first international success at the turn of 1972/73, taking 3rd place in the traditional junior chess tournament in Hallsberg. In 1975, in Tjentište Harry Schüssler represented Sweden in World Junior Chess Championship and together with Adam Kuligowski shared 5th-6th place. He twice won Swedish Chess Championship: in 1976 and 1978.

Harry Schüssler successes on the International Chess tournaments include, among others:

- 1st place (1978/79) in Rilton Cup tournament in Stockholm,
- 1st place (1978) in Eksjö,
- 1st place (1983) in Gausdal,
- shared 1st place (1986) in Malmö,
- 2nd place in Reykjavík (1981, in Nordic Chess Championship, behind Knut Jøran Helmers),
- shared 2nd place in Kiel (1979, together with Włodzimierz Schmidt),
- shared 2nd place in Hamburg (1980, together with Bojan Kurajica),
- shared 2nd place in Copenhagen (1988)

Harry Schüssler played for Sweden in the Chess Olympiads:

- In 1976, at fourth board in the 22nd Chess Olympiad in Haifa (+1, =3, -3),
- In 1978, at first reserve board in the 23rd Chess Olympiad in Buenos Aires (+2, =5, -2),
- In 1980, at fourth board in the 24th Chess Olympiad in La Valletta (+5, =3, -1) and won individual silver medal,
- In 1982, at second board in the 25th Chess Olympiad in Lucerne (+1, =7, -1),
- In 1984, at fourth board in the 26th Chess Olympiad in Thessaloniki (+1, =6, -2),
- In 1988, at second board in the 28th Chess Olympiad in Thessaloniki (+1, =5, -2).

Harry Schüssler played for Sweden in the European Team Chess Championship:

- In 1980, at fifth board in the 7th European Team Chess Championship in Skara (+0, =1, -3),
- In 1989, at second board in the 9th European Team Chess Championship in Haifa (+1, =6, -1).

Harry Schüssler played for Sweden in the European Team Chess Championship preliminaries:

- In 1977, at reserve board in the 6th European Team Chess Championship preliminaries (+0, =0, -2),
- In 1980, at fifth board in the 7th European Team Chess Championship preliminaries (+1, =0, -1),
- In 1983, at first board in the 8th European Team Chess Championship preliminaries (+2, =1, -1).

Harry Schüssler played for Sweden in the World Youth U26 Team Chess Championship:

- In 1981, at first board in the 3rd World Youth U26 Team Chess Championship in Graz (+4, =5, -2).

Harry Schüssler played for Sweden in the Nordic Chess Cup:

- In 1983, at first board in the 9th Nordic Chess Cup in Oslo (+1, =6, -0) and won team bronze medal,
- In 1985, at second board in the 10th Nordic Chess Cup in Pohja (+3, =4, -0) and won team gold medal.

Harry Schüssler played for Sweden in the Clare Benedict Cup:

- In 1977, at fourth board in the 22nd Clare Benedict Chess Cup in Copenhagen (+2, =3, -2) and won

team bronze and individual gold medals.

In 1978, Harry Schüssler was awarded the FIDE International Master (IM) title. In 1988, he was awarded the FIDE Grandmaster (GM) title.
