= Bergquist =

Bergquist is a Swedish surname, and may refer to:

- Arthur Bergquist (1930–1993), Swedish footballer
- Cole Bergquist (born 1985), American gridiron football quarterback
- Emil Bergquist (born 1955), American politician from Kansas
- Jonas Bergquist (born 1966), Swedish chemist, neuroscientist and academic
- Kenneth P. Bergquist (Department of Defense) (1944–2023), American brigadier general
- Kenneth P. Bergquist (United States Air Force) (1912–1993), United States Air Force general
- Patricia Bergquist (1933–2009), New Zealand anatomist and biologist
- Steve Bergquist (born 1979), American educator and politician from Washington State
- Thorwald Bergquist (1899–1972), Swedish jurist and politician
- Ulrika Bergquist (born 1969), Swedish journalist and television presenter

== See also ==
- Bergqvist
