= Axel Ornstein =

Swedish chess player (born 1952)

Personal information
- Born: 24 April 1952 (age 74) Boliden, Sweden

Chess career
- Country: Sweden
- Title: International Master (1975)
- Peak rating: 2480 (July 1981)

Axel Ornstein (born 24 April 1952), is a Swedish chess International Master (1975), seven-times Swedish Chess Championship winner (1972, 1973, 1975, 1977, 1984, 1987, 1988).

== Biography ==
In 1967 Axel Ornstein won Swedish Junior Chess Championship. In the 1970s and 1980s he was one of the leading Swedish chess players. Axel Ornstein participated many times in the finals of Swedish Chess Championship and won ninth medals: 7 gold (1972, 1973, 1975, 1977, 1984, 1987, 1988) and 2 bronze (1994, 1995). Three times Axel Ornstein shared first place in the International Chess tournaments Rilton Cup in Stockholm: 1974/75, 1980/81 and 1983/84. Also he won or shared first place in international chess tournaments in Sofia (1976), Pamporovo (1981), Järvenpää (1985).

Axel Ornstein played for Sweden in the Chess Olympiads:

- In 1972, at third board in the 20th Chess Olympiad in Skopje (+4, =6, -5),
- In 1974, at second board in the 21st Chess Olympiad in Nice (+3, =9, -4),
- In 1976, at second board in the 22nd Chess Olympiad in Haifa (+2, =5, -3),
- In 1978, at second board in the 23rd Chess Olympiad in Buenos Aires (+3, =1, -3),
- In 1982, at second reserve board in the 25th Chess Olympiad in Lucerne (+3, =3, -2),
- In 1984, at third board in the 26th Chess Olympiad in Thessaloniki (+2, =4, -4).

Axel Ornstein played for Sweden in the European Team Chess Championship:

- In 1980, at sixth board in the 7th European Team Chess Championship in Skara (+3, =2, -2).

Axel Ornstein played for Sweden in the World Student Team Chess Championships:

- In 1972, at second board in the 19th World Student Team Chess Championship in Graz (+4, =2, -4),
- In 1974, at first board in the 20th World Student Team Chess Championship in Teesside (+8, =4, -1).

Axel Ornstein played for Sweden in the Clare Benedict Cup:

- In 1974, at second board in the 21st Clare Benedict Chess Cup in Cala Galdana (+2, =3, -1).

Axel Ornstein played for Sweden in the Nordic Chess Cups:

- In 1973, at second board in the 4th Nordic Chess Cup in Ribe (+2, =2, -1) and won team silver medal,
- In 1974, at first board in the 5th Nordic Chess Cup in Eckernförde (+1, =1, -3),
- In 1975, at first board in the 6th Nordic Chess Cup in Hindås (+1, =2, -2),
- In 1976, at first board in the 7th Nordic Chess Cup in Bremen (+2, =0, -3),
- In 1977, at first board in the 8th Nordic Chess Cup in Glücksburg (+4, =0, -1) and won team gold and individual gold medals,
- In 1983, at third board in the 9th Nordic Chess Cup in Oslo (+2, =3, -2) and won team bronze medal.
