= Gustaf Nyholm =

Swedish chess player

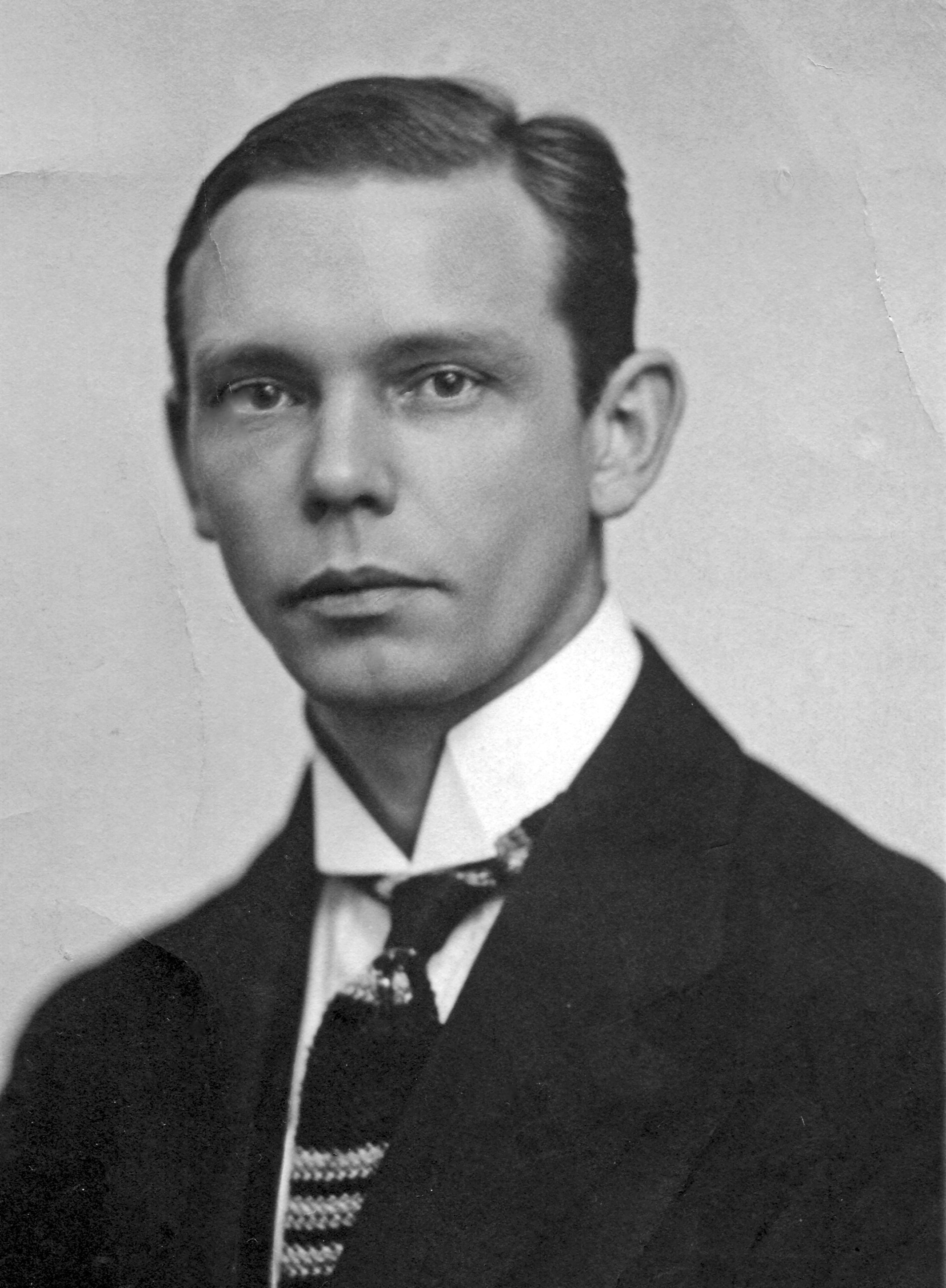
Gustaf Nyholm

Gustaf Nyholm (27 January 1880 – 12 September 1957) was a Swedish chess master.

He was the first Swedish Champion (1917–1921 and 1922–1924), and a Nordic Champion in 1917. He was born and died in Stockholm.

In 1907 he came 6th in Copenhagen (the 6th Nordic-ch, Paul Saladin Leonhardt won). In 1909 he finished second, behind Joel Fridlizius, in Gothenburg (the 7th Nordic-ch, B tournament). He took 11th in the Hamburg 1910 chess tournament (the 17th DSB Congress, Hauptturnier A, Gersz Rotlewi won). In 1912 he took 11th in Stockholm (the 8th Nordic-ch, Alexander Alekhine won). In 1914 he took 10th at Baden bei Wien (Rudolf Spielmann won).

During World War I, he tied for 6-7th at Copenhagen 1916 (the 9th Nordic-ch, Paul Johner won), and twice won at Stockholm 1916 and Christiania (Oslo) 1917 (the 10th Nordic-ch), took 4th at Stockholm 1917, and took 2nd behind Karl Berndtsson at Gothenburg 1918. After the war, he tied for 7-8th in Göteborg 1919 (the 11th Nordic-ch, Spielmann and Anton Olson won), and took 3rd at Uppsala 1923 (Allan Nilsson and Olson won).

Nyholm played for Sweden at second board (+3 -8 =4) in the 1st Chess Olympiad at London 1927.
