= Arthur Bergquist =

Swedish footballer (1930–1993)

Personal information
- Full name: Arthur Bergquist
- Date of birth: 18 June 1930
- Date of death: 1993
- Position: Defender

Senior career*
| Years | Team | Apps | (Gls) |
| 1950–1957 | Malmö FF | 158 | (5) |
- * Club domestic league appearances and goals

Arthur Bergquist (18 June 1930 – 1993) was a Swedish footballer who played as a defender.
