= Folke Ekström =

Swedish chess player (1906–2000)

Nils Johan Folke Ekström (12 October 1906, in Lund – 25 January 2000, in Saltsjobaden) was a Swedish International Master (IM) of chess and of correspondence chess (IMC). He won the Swedish Championships in 1947 and 1948; Swedish Correspondence Championships in 1941, 1964, and 1971; and the European Correspondence Championship V, 1967–1971. According to ChessMetrics, in 1946-1947, he was rated #9 in the world.

== Tournaments and matches ==
Ekström was active in high-level national Swedish and international over-the-board chess during a short period of just over five years in the 1940s, with some very impressive successes. He won at Stockholm 1942, tied with Stig Lundholm, ahead of both Gösta Stoltz and Erik Lundin, both of whom became Grandmasters later on. Then at Stockholm 1943/44, he won ahead of Lundholm. Ekström lost a 1944 match to the world-class grandmaster Paul Keres by 5–1, following Keres' 'hors concours' appearance at the 1944 Swedish Championship, where he had placed second.

Ekström then finished second himself at the strong Hastings 1945/46 tournament, just half a point behind grandmaster Savielly Tartakower, with a score of 9/11. This was ahead of former World Champion Max Euwe, American champion Arnold Denker, and American Olympian Herman Steiner, who all trailed well behind with 7 points. At Zaandam 1946, Ekström shared second with László Szabó, an eventual nine-time Hungarian champion and three-time Candidate, with 8½/11. The winner was Euwe, who made 9½/11. Swedish Olympian Stoltz was next with 8. Then, at Stockholm 1946/47, Ekström tied for first with Lundin. They scored 7/9, ahead of (among others) Swedish Olympian Gösta Danielsson and Finnish champion Eero Böök, who shared third with 6.

Ekstrom won the Swedish Championship in 1947 and 1948. In the late 1940s, he chose to pursue a civil career rather than become a chess professional, and this did not please the Swedish Chess Federation. Ekström was awarded the International Master title by FIDE, the World Chess Federation, in 1950.

== Team play ==
Ekstrom represented Sweden on top board, ahead of Lundin (two) and Danielsson (three), in the two-day, ten-board team match against Denmark, held at Copenhagen in September 1947. Sweden won 12½–7½.

Other than a couple of minor Swedish team events, this seems to be the recorded extent of Ekström's competitive chess career in over-the-board play. He never represented Sweden in Chess Olympiad competition, although he very well could have, based upon his successes, as he was finishing ahead of team members in tournaments during the 1940s. Chess Olympiad competition was dormant during Ekstrom's most active period, due to World War II.

== Correspondence play ==
He played correspondence chess with success as well, earning the IMC title in 1971. Ekstrom was Swedish correspondence champion in 1941, 1964 and 1971. He won the European Correspondence Championship V, 1967–1971. He placed tied 7–8th in the 7th World Correspondence Championship, 1972–1976, with 9/17; the tournament was won by Soviet Yakov Estrin.

== Legacy ==
The Ekström Variation of the Queen's Gambit Declined is named for him. It runs 1.d4 d5 2.c4 e6 3.Nc3 Nf6 4.Nf3 c6 5.Bg5 dxc4 6.e4 b5 7.e5 h6 8.Bh4 g5 9.exf6 gxh4 10.Ne5.
