= Stellan Brynell =

Swedish chess grandmaster (born 1962)

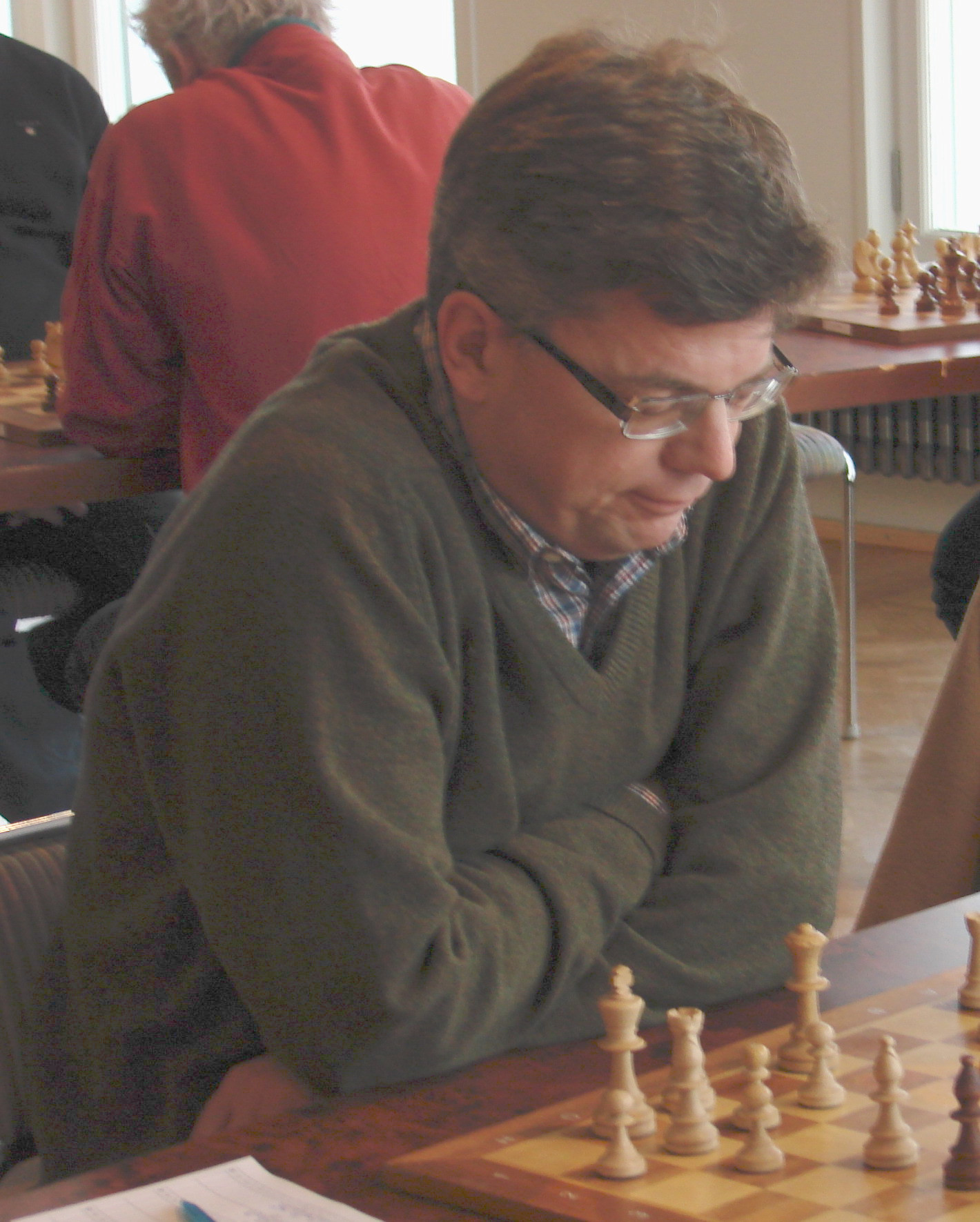

Personal information
- Born: September 28, 1962 (age 63)

Chess career
- Country: Sweden
- Title: Grandmaster (2001)
- Peak rating: 2534 (January 2003)

Stellan Brynell (born September 28, 1962) is a Swedish chess grandmaster. He became Swedish champion in 1991 and in 2005. He represents the Swedish club Limhamns SK.

== Team events ==
He represented Sweden in the Chess Olympiads of 1992, 1998, 2000, 2002 and 2004. He also participated at the European Team Chess Championships of 1989, 1999, 2001, 2003 and 2005.
