= Magnus Wahlbom =

Swedish chess player (born 1945)

Personal information
- Born: 15 May 1945 (age 81)

Chess career
- Country: Sweden
- Peak rating: 2321 (July 2001)

Magnus Wahlbom (born 15 May 1945) is a Swedish chess player, Swedish Chess Championship winner (1974), Chess Olympiad individual bronze medal winner (1976).

== Biography ==
In the 1970s, Magnus Wahlbom was one of the leading Swedish chess players. He won two medals in Swedish Chess Championship: gold (1974) and bronze (1976).

Magnus Wahlbom played for Sweden in the Chess Olympiad:

- In 1976, at first reserve board in the 22nd Chess Olympiad in Haifa (+6, =1, -2) and won individual bronze medal.

Magnus Wahlbom played for Sweden in the World Student Team Chess Championships:

- In 1965, at first reserve board in the 12th World Student Team Chess Championship in Sinaia (+2, =1, -2),
- In 1969, at second board in the 16th World Student Team Chess Championship in Dresden (+5, =2, -4),
- In 1970, at first board in the 17th World Student Team Chess Championship in Haifa (+3, =5, -2).

Magnus Wahlbom played for Sweden in the Clare Benedict Cup:

- In 1977, at second board in the 22nd Clare Benedict Chess Cup in Copenhagen (+1, =4, -2) and won team bronze medal.

Magnus Wahlbom played for Sweden in the Nordic Chess Cup:

- In 1976, at third board in the 7th Nordic Chess Cup in Bremen (+1, =3, -1).

Magnus Wahlbom with Swedish chess club Lund ASK twice participated in European Chess Club Cup (1976, 1979) and in 1976 his club played in this tournament semifinal.

In the 2010s, Magnus Wahlbom began to actively participate in senior chess tournaments. In 2012, he participated in European Senior Chess Championship, and in 2014 – in the World Senior Chess Championship.
