= Evgeny Agrest =

Belarusian-Swedish chess grandmaster (born 1966)

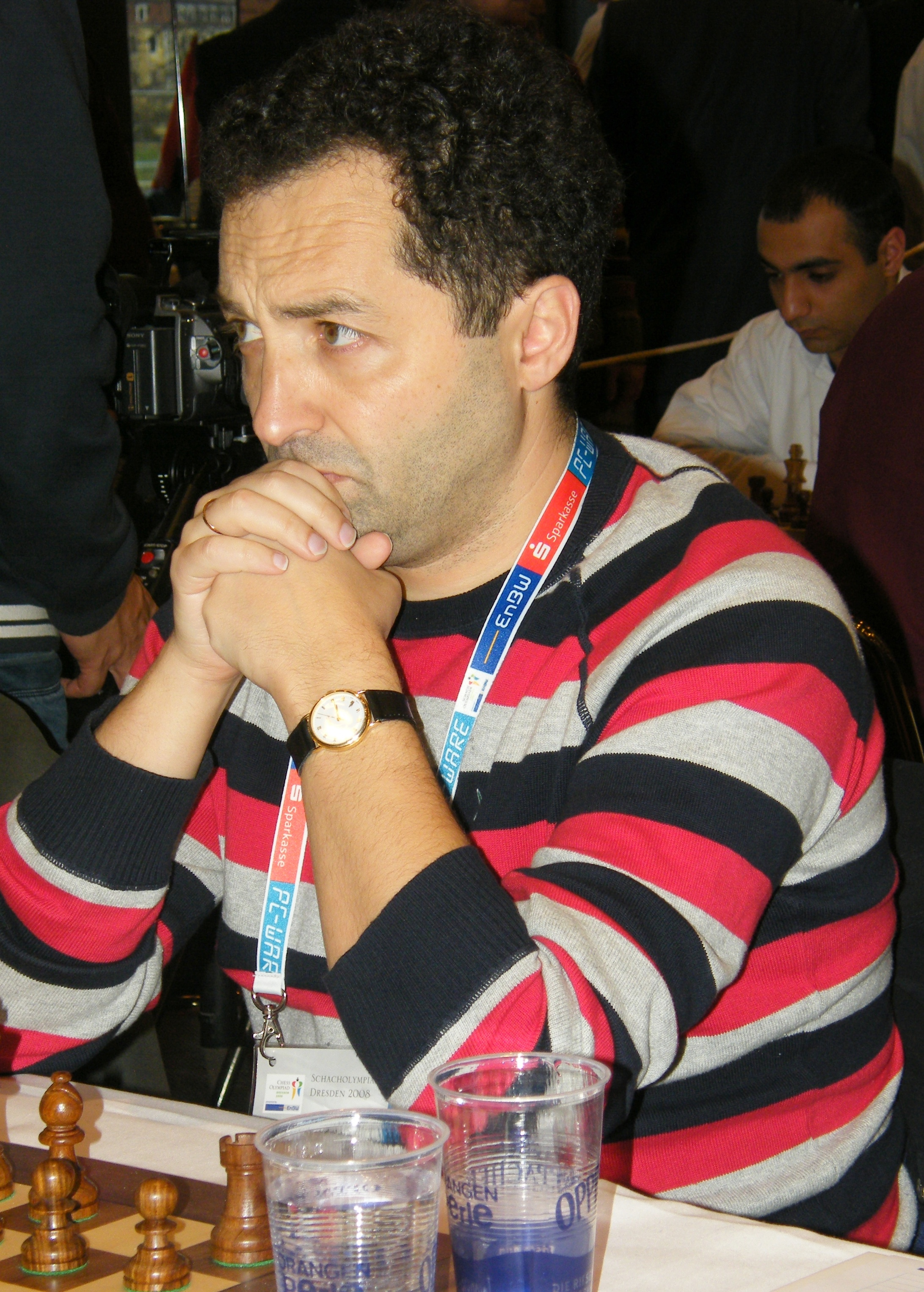
- at the Dresden Olympiad, 2008

Personal information
- Born: August 15, 1966 (age 59) Vitebsk, Belarusian SSR, Soviet Union
- Spouse: Svetlana Agrest

Chess career
- Country: Soviet Union (until 1992); Belarus (1992–1996); Sweden (since 1997)
- Title: Grandmaster (1997)
- FIDE rating: 2553 (July 2026)
- Peak rating: 2616 (January 2004)
- Peak ranking: No. 82 (January 2000)

Evgeny Agrest (born 15 August 1966 in Vitebsk, Belarus) is a Soviet-born Swedish chess grandmaster (1997).

In 1994, he graduated with a degree in Economics and in the same year emigrated to Sweden. He is four-time Swedish champion (1998, 2001, 2003, and 2004), and thrice Nordic champion (2001 jointly with Artur Kogan, 2003 jointly with Curt Hansen, and 2005). In 2010 Agrest tied for 1st–6th in the European Union Championship, taking third place on tiebreak. He played for Sweden in the Chess Olympiads of 1998, 2000, 2002, 2004, 2006, 2008, 2010 and 2014.

As of August 2015, he has been Nils Grandelius's trainer since 2013.

Agrest is married to Woman International Master (WIM) Svetlana Agrest with both his wife and his daughter playing for the Swedish Women's chess team.

== Books ==
- Delchev, Aleksander; Agrest, Evgenij (2011). The Safest Grünfeld. Chess Stars. ISBN 978-954-8782-81-4.
