= Emanuel Berg =

Swedish chess grandmaster (born 1981)

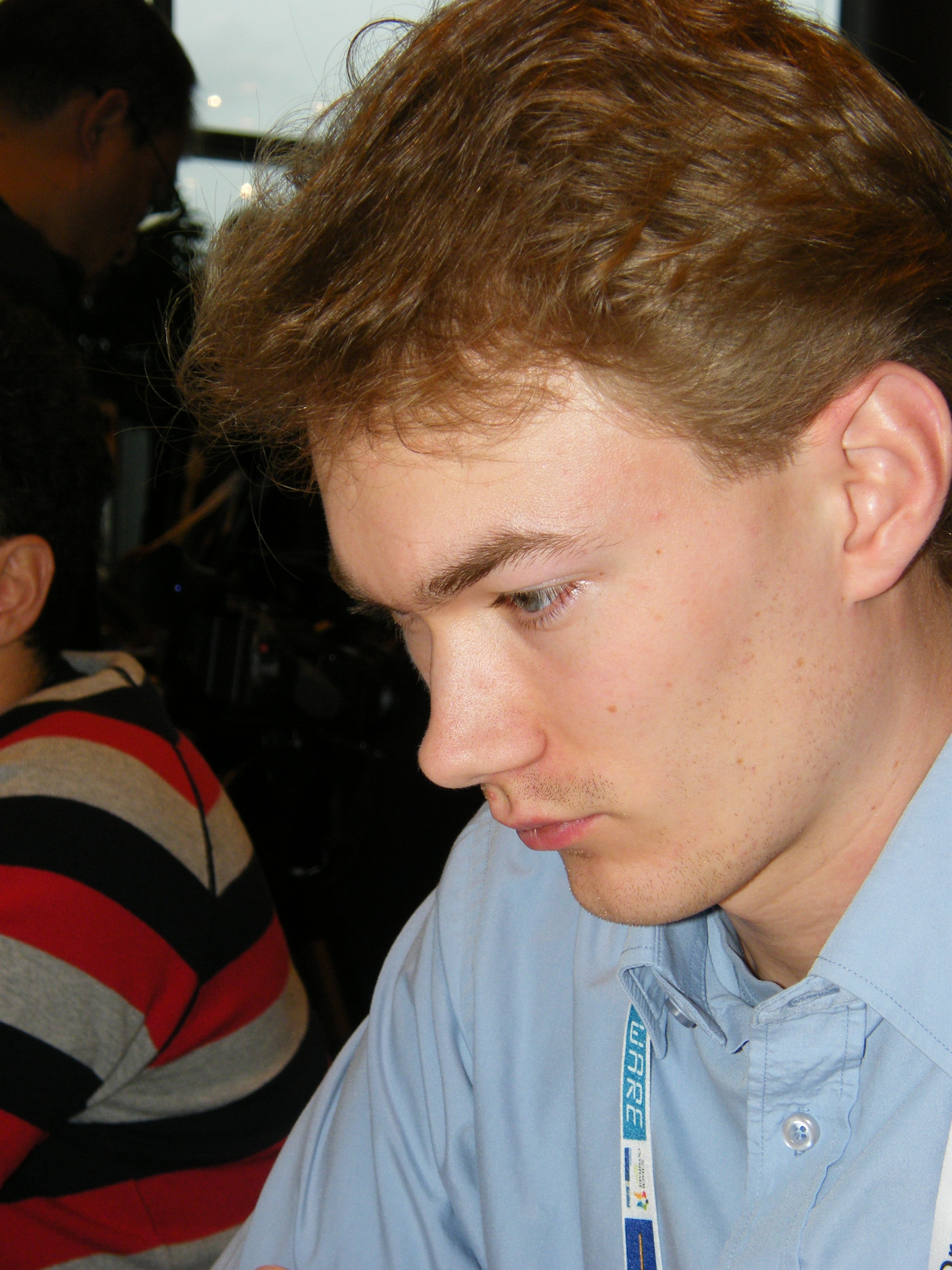
- Berg at the Dresden Olympiad, 2008

Personal information
- Born: 28 December 1981 (age 44) Skövde, Sweden

Chess career
- Country: Sweden
- Title: FIDE Grandmaster (2004); ICCF Sr. International Master (2018)
- FIDE rating: 2474 (July 2026)
- Peak rating: 2627 (November 2010)

Emanuel Berg (born 28 December 1981) is a Swedish chess grandmaster. He is a two-time Swedish Chess Champion.

== First moves and playing style ==
As a youngster, he made solid progress and was consequently selected to represent his country in the various age categories of the European Youth and World Youth Championships. Surprisingly, he did not manage to secure a medal, but came very close in 1996, at Rimavská Sobota, finishing the European Under-16 contest with a share of 2nd-5th places and missing the silver and bronze medals only on tie-break.

As Berg received his chess education in the shadow of national legend Ulf Andersson, it might be expected that his playing style would mirror that of Sweden's most successful player of the modern era. However, the styles of the players are almost polar opposites, the younger man showing a distinct preference for aggressive, dynamic chess.

== Tournament record ==
He spent several years making slow, but sure progress. He earned his GM title in 2004, following a number of tournament successes, including wins at Budapest 1999, Skellefteå 2001 (shared with Jonny Hector) and Bermuda 2002 (after a play-off).

Since 1998, he has regularly entered the national championship, finishing runner-up on no fewer than five occasions (2001, 2004, 2006, 2007 and 2008) and winning the event in 2009 and 2010. His consistent, strong performances have helped his Elo rating to edge past 2600.

There have been other notable results in international competition; he was joint winner of Stockholm's Rilton Cup in 2004/5 (with Sergei Volkov and Evgeny Gleizerov), won outright at Sóller in 2006 and was fourth behind Ivanchuk, Karpov and Kasimdzhanov at the Keres Memorial the same year. In 2007, he came third at Wijk aan Zee's Corus 'C' event (after Michał Krasenkow and Ian Nepomniachtchi), having featured in a five-way tie for first place at the Politiken Cup (with Krasenkow, Sargissian, de Firmian and Malakhov). At the 'Politiken' event of 2008, he finished just a half point behind the leaders.

Elsewhere in 2008, he scored 7/10 to finish 10th= at the Gibtelecom Masters in Gibraltar and the same score brought him a creditable share of fifth place at the EU Championship in Liverpool. At the Najdorf Memorial in Warsaw, he placed joint second with Tomi Nybäck, after Krishnan Sasikiran.

In 2012, he shared first place with Slavko Cicak and Hans Tikkanen at the Västerås Open.

== Team events ==
Berg is regularly selected to represent his country at major team events and following a significant upswing in his rating, nowadays plays on board one. He has participated in all of the Olympiads between 2002–2008 and the European Team Chess Championships of 1999, 2003 and 2007. At the Dresden 2008 Olympiad, he had a disastrous result, winning no games at all, for a lowly score of 1½ points from 9 games. In stark contrast, his team-mates did exceedingly well, keeping Sweden in contention round after round, and thereby ensuring that Berg had to endure a barrage of top-class opponents, including two ex-world champions.

Berg is a close friend of Sweden's latest grandmaster and Olympiad team-mate, Pontus Carlsson. They played league chess together for the successful Sollentuna SK club. In 2009 he joined Burgsvik SK, currently playing in the third division in Sweden.

== Notable games ==
- Emanuel Berg vs Evgeny Bareev, 15th EU Team Ch 2005, French Defense: Classical, Burn Variation (C11), 1–0
- Suat Atalik vs Emanuel Berg, Sigeman & Co 2006, Queen's Indian Defense: Fianchetto, Check Variation (E15), 0–1
- Nadezhda Kosintseva vs Emanuel Berg, Corus Group C 2007, French Defense: Normal Variation (C10), 0–1
- Stephen Gordon vs Emanuel Berg, Hastings 2009, Queen's Gambit Declined: Albin Countergambit (D08), 0–1
- Emanuel Berg vs. Maxime-Vachier Lagrave, Tradewise Gibraltar 2012, Sicilian Defense, Najdorf Variation (B96), 1–0
