= Jan Kotrč =

Czech chess player (1862–1943)

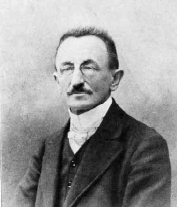
Jan Kotrč

Jan Kotrč (23 August 1862, Bielitz – 17 October 1943, Vlachovo Březí) was a Czech chess master, chess publisher and chess problem composer.

Born in Bielitz (then Austrian Silesia, now Bielsko-Biała in Poland), he was an editor of chess magazines Šach-Mat (1884-1885), České listy šachové (1896-1900) in Prague, and Arbeiter Schachzeitung in the 1920s-1930s in Vienna.

He shared 2nd with Karel Traxler, behind Jan Kvicala, at Prague 1891 (the 3rd Congress of the Bohemian Chess Association), tied for 4-6th at Dresden 1892 (the 7th DSB Congress, Hauptturnier A, Paul Lipke won). He won a match against Josef Kvicala (+3 –0 =2) at Prague 1893, and took 8th at Vienna 1899/1900 (Kolisch Memorial, Géza Maróczy won).
