= Tiger Hillarp Persson =

Swedish chess grandmaster (born 1970)

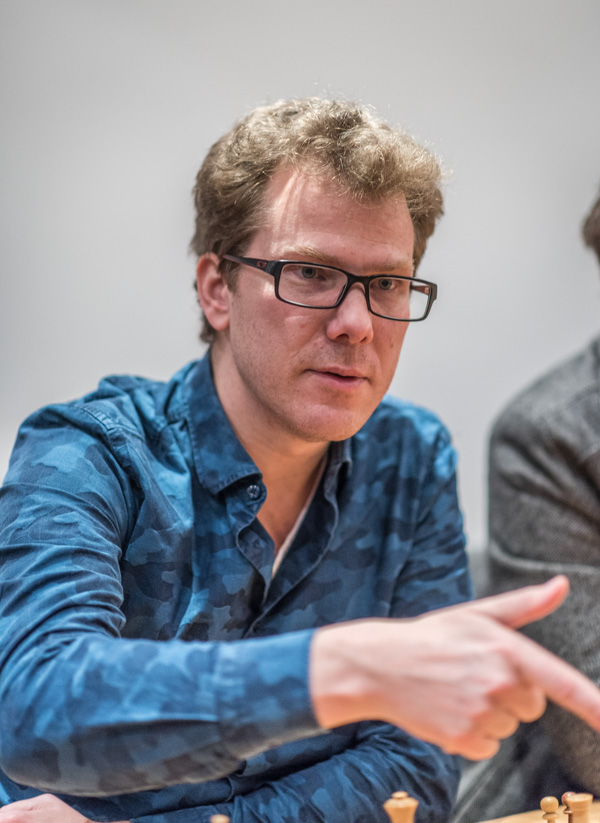
- Hillarp Persson in 2016

Personal information
- Born: 28 October 1970 (age 55) Malmö, Sweden

Chess career
- Country: Sweden
- Title: Grandmaster (1999)
- FIDE rating: 2418 (July 2026)
- Peak rating: 2618 (April 2009)

Tiger Hillarp Persson is a Swedish chess grandmaster. He is a Swedish Chess Champion. In Go he attained the level of amateur 1-Dan on KGS in 2015 and 3-Dan in the EGF ratings in 2023.

== Chess career ==
He won tournaments in Gentofte (VISA Nordic Grand Prix), ahead of Sune Berg Hansen, Simen Agdestein, Einar Gausel, Helgi Grétarsson, Heikki Westerinen and others, York in 1999, Jersey (2000), Barcelona Sants 2003 and multiple times the Guernsey International Chess Open (2001, 2003, 2007, 2008, 2009, 2010 (best on tie-break), 2016, and again 2018 (best on tie-break)). He finished second in the Nordic Chess Championship in Vammala, Finland (2005). In 2008 he was the winner of the Sigeman & Co Chess Tournament in his hometown of Malmö with an impressive 7 1/2 points. In 2009 he finished second in the C group of the Corus Chess Tournament. Representing Sweden, he scored individual bronze medals in the Chess Olympiad in Elista, 1998 and in Dresden 2008.

Tiger has been called 'one of the most creative and non-traditional players', exemplified by his construction of 'one of the few self-administered pawn forks in chess history' in the game against Peter Heine Nielsen. His game against Tomas Laurusas at the 43rd Chess Olympiad was ranked best game of 2018 by the editors of Chess.com.

Tiger has written two books on the Modern Defense, including Tiger's Modern.

== Books & DVDs ==
- Hillarp Persson, Tiger (2005). Tiger's Modern. Quality Chess. ISBN 978-9197524360.
- Hillarp Persson, Tiger (2014). The Modern Tiger. Quality Chess. ISBN 978-1-907982-83-5.
- Hillarp Persson, Tiger (2013), Fighting for the Initiative in Chess (DVD) - A2B Media Ltd
- Hillarp Persson, Tiger (2024). Tiger's Chaos Theory. Quality Chess. ISBN 978-1784832124.

== Notable games ==
- Tiger Hillarp Persson vs Judit Polgar, Hotel Bali Stars 2003, Nimzo-Indian Defense: Kmoch Variation (E20), 1-0
- Eduardas Rozentalis vs Tiger Hillarp Persson, 12th Sigeman & Co Chess Tournament 2004, French Defense: Rubinstein, Fort Knox Variation (C10), 0-1
- Vladimir Petkov vs Tiger Hillarp Persson, 37th Chess Olympiad 2006, Slav Defense: Modern Line (D11), 0-1
- Peter Heine Nielsen vs Tiger Hillarp Persson, 20:th Politiken Cup 1998, King's Indian Defence: Orthodox Variation, Bayonet Attack (E97), 0-1
- Tiger Hillarp Persson vs Tomas Laurusas, 43rd Chess Olympiad 2018, rd. 7, Zukertort Opening: Queen Pawn Defense (A06), 1-0
