= Gösta Stoltz =

Swedish chess grandmaster (1904–1963)

Gösta Stoltz (May 9, 1904 – July 25, 1963) was a Swedish chess grandmaster. Stoltz won the Swedish championships at Halmstad 1951, Hålland 1952, and Örebro 1953. He was awarded the International Master title in 1950, and the Grandmaster title in 1954.

== Biography ==
Gösta Stoltz (from Tidskrift för Schack October–November 1931)

Stoltz played a few matches with strong chess masters. In 1926, he lost to Mikhail Botvinnik (+0 –1 =1) at a team match Stockholm – Leningrad in Stockholm. In 1927, he drew with Allan Nilsson (+2 –2 =1) in Göteborg (Swedish Chess Championship). In 1930, he won against Isaac Kashdan (+3 –2 =1) in Stockholm. In 1930, he lost to Rudolf Spielmann (+2–3=1) in Stockholm. In 1931, he won against Salo Flohr (+4 –3 =1) in Göteborg. In 1931, he lost to Flohr (+1 –4 =3) in Prague. In 1931, he drew with Gideon Ståhlberg (+2 –2 =2) in Göteborg. In 1934, he lost to Aron Nimzowitsch (+1 –2 =3) in Stockholm. In September 1935, he played at a match Sweden vs Germany (Scheveningen system), and took 2nd individual result, behind Ståhlberg, in Zoppot (Sopot).

Stoltz played for Sweden in nine Chess Olympiads (1927–1937, 1952,1954) and in 3rd unofficial Chess Olympiad at Munich 1936:

- at fourth board (+5 -5 =5) in the 1st Olympiad at London 1927;
- at first board (+6 -5 =5) in the 2nd Olympiad at The Hague 1928;
- at third board (+7 -4 =6) in the 3rd Olympiad at Hamburg 1930;
- won individual gold medal at second board (+10 -1 =7) in the 4th Olympiad at Prague 1931;
- won team bronze medal playing at second board (+5 -3 =6) at the 5th Olympiad at Folkestone 1933.
- won team silver medal and individual bronze medal playing at second board (+8 -3 =8) in the 6th Olympiad at Warsaw 1935;
- at third board (+8 -4 =7) at Munich 1936;
- at third board (+2 -7 =3) in the 7th Olympiad at Stockholm 1937;
- at second board (+3 -3 =4) at the 10th Olympiad at Helsinki 1952;
- at third board (+0 -0 =2) at the 11th Olympiad at Amsterdam 1954.

At the beginning of his international career, Stoltz tied for 11-13th in Berlin (BSG) in 1928. The event was won by Efim Bogoljubow. In 1930, he tied for 2nd-3rd with Bogoljubow, behind Kashdan, in Stockholm. In 1931, he tied for 4-7th in Bled (Alexander Alekhine won). In 1931/32, he tied for 5-8th in Hastings (Flohr won). In 1932, he won in Swinemünde. In 1933, he took 2nd, behind Nimzowitsch, in Copenhagen. In 1934, he took 3rd in Stockholm (Erik Lundin won). In 1935, he tied for 1st with Lindberg in Harnosand. In 1935, he took 4th in Örebro (Alekhine won). In 1935, he tied for 5-6th in Bad Nauheim (Bogoljubow won). In 1936, he tied for 2nd-3rd with Böök, behind Vladimirs Petrovs in Helsinki (Helsingfors). In 1936, he took 3rd in Helsinki (Lundin won). In 1937, he tied for 3rd-4th in Stockholm (Reuben Fine won). In 1938, he won in Stockholm (SWE-ch). In 1939, he took 5th in Stockholm (SWE-ch, Stahlberg won).

During World War II, Stoltz played in Sweden and Germany. In 1940, he tied for 4-5th in the Stockholm championship, which was won by Nils Bergkvist). In September 1941, he won, ahead of Lundin and Alekhine, in the Munich 1941 chess tournament (the 2nd Europaturnier). In June 1942, he took 6th in the Salzburg 1942 chess tournament (Alekhine won). In September 1942, he tied for 9-10th in Munich (München – Europameisterschaft, European Championship). The event was won by Alexander Alekhine. In 1943, he tied for 1st with Lundholm in Stockholm. In 1943/44, he took 4th in Stockholm (Folke Ekström won). In 1944, he took 3rd, behind Stig Lundholm, and Paul Keres, in Lidköping, (SWE-ch).

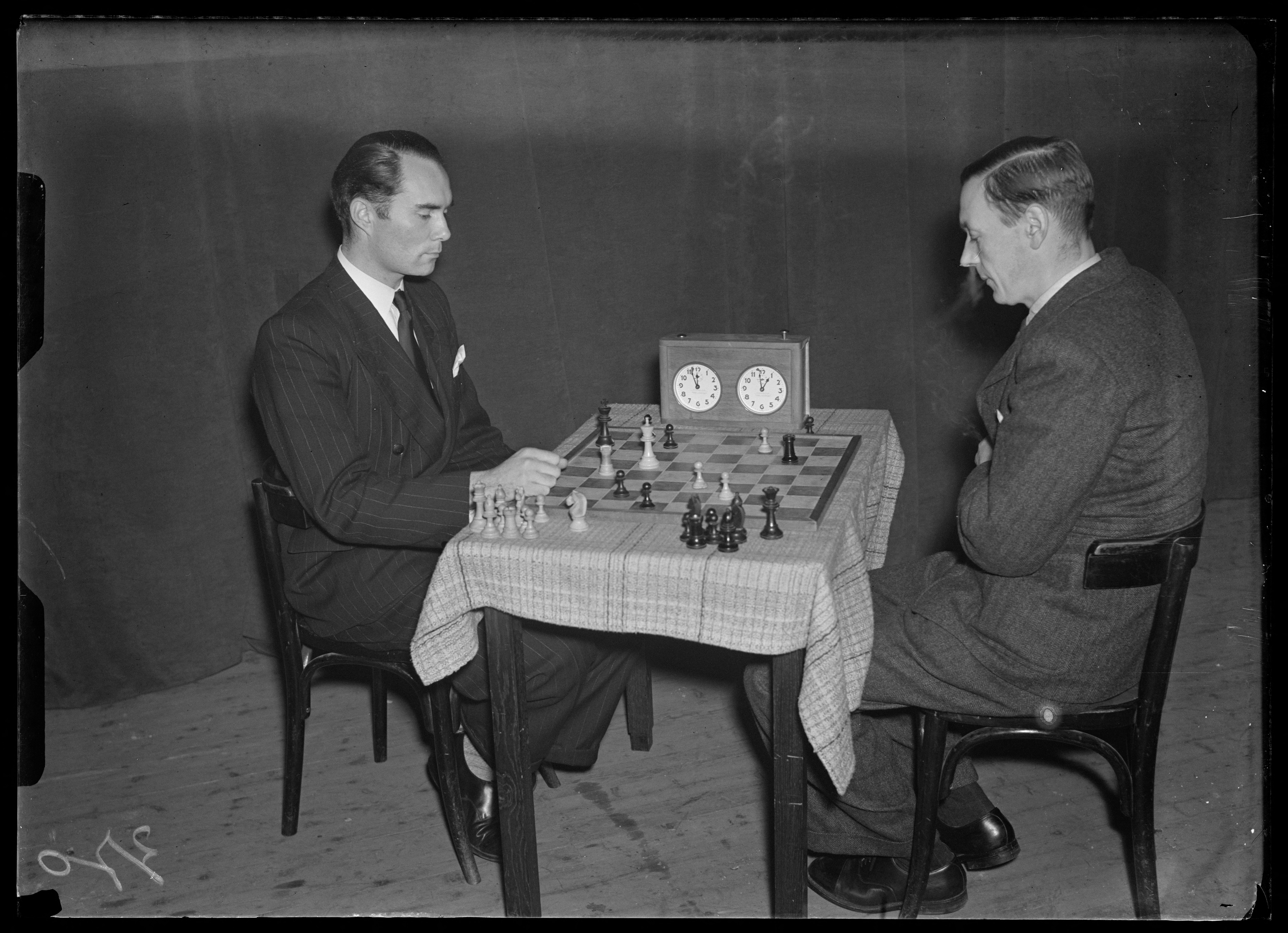
O'Kelly vs. Stoltz (1946)

After the war, Stoltz played in a few international tournaments. In 1946, he took 2nd, behind Albéric O'Kelly de Galway in Beverwijk. In 1946, he took 4th in Zaandam (László Szabó won). In 1946, he tied for 8-9th in the Groningen 1946 chess tournament (Botvinnik won). In 1946, he tied for 2nd-3rd in Prague (Miguel Najdorf won). In 1947, he tied for 1st with Eero Böök in Helsinki (zonal), and drew a play-off match (+1 –1 =6). In 1948, he took 18th in Saltsjöbaden (interzonal). The event was won by David Bronstein. In 1948, he won in Stockholm. In 1948, he tied for 4-5th in Karlovy Vary (Karlsbad) – Mariánské Lázně (Marienbad). The event was won by Jan Foltys. In 1950, he tied for 9-13th in Bled (Najdorf won). In 1951, he tied for 8-9th in Dortmund (O’Kelly won). In 1951, he tied for 3rd-4th in Mariánské Lázně – Prague (zonal won by Luděk Pachman. In 1952, he took 16th in Stockholm (interzonal won by Alexander Kotov). In 1962, he took 12th in Belgrade (Hermann Pilnik won).
