= Axel Smith (chess player) =

Swedish chess grandmaster (born 1986)

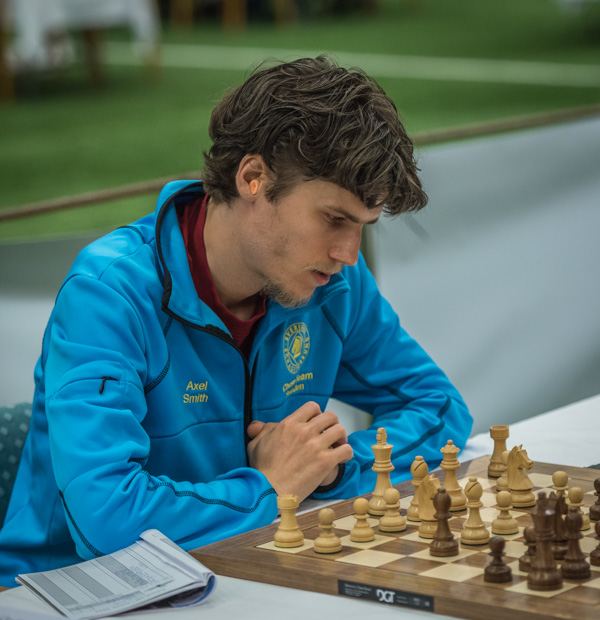

Personal information
- Born: 27 June 1986 (age 40) Ystad, Sweden

Chess career
- Country: Sweden
- Title: Grandmaster (2016)
- FIDE rating: 2439 (July 2026)
- Peak rating: 2516 (August 2016)

Axel Smith (born 27 June 1986) is a Swedish chess player and author.

Smith earned the FIDE title of Grandmaster (GM) in 2016.

He is the author or co-author of several chess books including Pump Up Your Rating (Quality Chess, 2013) and The Woodpecker Method (Quality Chess, 2018).
