= Jonny Hector =

Swedish chess grandmaster (born 1964)

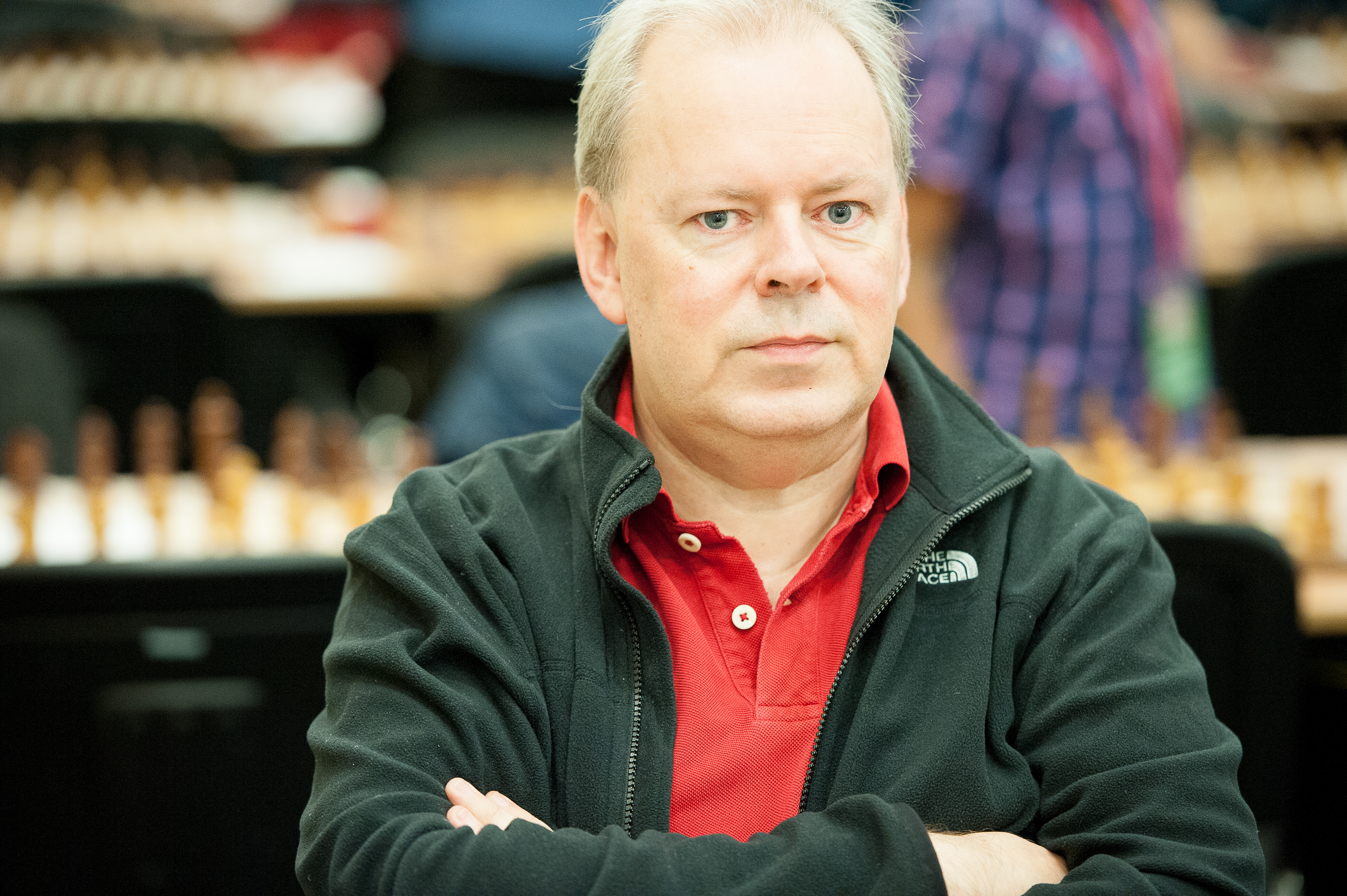

Personal information
- Born: 13 February 1964 (age 62) Malmö, Sweden

Chess career
- Country: Sweden
- Title: Grandmaster (1991); ICCF Grandmaster (1999)
- FIDE rating: 2415 (July 2026)
- Peak rating: 2609 (May 2010)
- ICCF rating: 2616 (January 2001)
- ICCF peak rating: 2645 (April 2000)

Jonny Hector (born 13 February 1964) is a Swedish chess player. In over-the-board chess, he received the FIDE title of Grandmaster (GM) in 1991. In correspondence chess, he earned the ICCF title of Grandmaster (GM) in 1999.

Born in Malmö, Sweden, Hector has lived in Denmark for many years. He learned chess at the relatively late age of 14, but quickly became a very strong player. In 1987 he was equal first in the strong Cappelle-la-Grande open (with Anthony Kosten and Anatoly Vaisser).

In 2002, he won the Swedish championship at Skara.

He has reached a tie in 1st place in the Politiken Cup in Copenhagen four times. In 2000, he tied with Boris Gulko and Lars Bo Hansen. In 2006, he tied with Vadim Malakhatko and Nigel Short. In 2008, he tied with Sergei Tiviakov, Vladimir Malakhov, Yuriy Kuzubov, Peter Heine Nielsen, and Boris Savchenko. In 2012, he tied with Ivan Sokolov and Ivan Cheparinov.

He has an aggressive attacking style, and is known for playing unusual chess openings, for example the Milner-Barry Gambit of the French Defense and the Charousek Variation of the Ruy Lopez, Classical Defense.
