= Erik Lundin =

Swedish chess grandmaster (1904–1988)

Personal information
- Full name: Erik Ruben Lundin
- Born: 2 July 1904
- Died: 5 December 1988 (aged 84)

Chess career
- Country: Sweden
- Title: Honorary Grandmaster (1983); International Master (1950)

Erik Ruben Lundin (2 July 1904 – 5 December 1988) was a Swedish chess master.

In 1928, he won in Oslo, took 5th in Helsingborg, tied for 2nd-3rd in Stockholm (Quadrangular, Richard Réti won). In 1929, he took 2nd in Gothenburg (Nordic Chess Championship, Gideon Ståhlberg won), and took 3rd in Västerås. In 1930, he took 7th in Stockholm (Isaac Kashdan won).

In 1931, Lundin tied for 1st-3rd with Salo Flohr and Gösta Stoltz in Gothenburg. In 1932, he tied for 1st with Ståhlberg in Karlskrona. In 1933, he won a match against Rudolf Spielmann (+1 -0 =5) in Stockholm. In 1934, he won in Stockholm, and took 2nd in Copenhagen (Nordic-ch; Aron Nimzowitsch won). In 1935, he took 2nd, with a score of 7.5/9, behind Alexander Alekhine's 8.5, in Örebro, after losing to Alekhine in the final round. In 1936, he took 4th in Margate (Flohr won), won in Ostend, and won in Helsinki (Nordic-ch). In 1937, he took 7th in Stockholm (Reuben Fine won), won in Copenhagen (Nordic-ch) and won a match for the Nordic Champion title against Erik Andersen 3,5 : 2,5.

In 1938, he won in Kalmar, and tied for 2nd-3rd with Henrik Carlsson, behind Ståhlberg, in Örebro (Nordic-ch). In 1939, he took 4th in Alingsås (SWE-ch; Ståhlberg won), and tied for 1st with Ståhlberg in Oslo (Nordic-ch).

During World War II, Lundin won at Gothenburg 1941 (Swedish Chess Championship). He tied for 2nd-3rd with Alekhine, behind Stoltz, at Munich 1941 (2nd Europaturnier). In 1942, he tied for 3rd-4th with Stoltz in Stockholm (Folke Ekström and Stig Lundholm won). In 1942, he won in Östersund (SWE-ch). In 1943, he tied for 2nd-3rd with Olof Kinnmark, behind Bengt Ekenberg, in Malmö (SWE-ch).

Erik Lundin (Groningen, 1946)

In 1945, he won in Visby (SWE-ch). In 1946, he won in Motala (SWE-ch), and tied for 8-9th in Groningen (Mikhail Botvinnik won). In 1947, he tied for 5-6th in Helsinki (zonal; Eero Böök and Stoltz won). In 1948, he took 20th in Saltsjöbaden (interzonal; David Bronstein won), and won in Bad Gastein.

In 1951, he took 2nd, behind Moshe Czerniak, in Vienna. In 1952, he won in Zürich ahead of Max Euwe. In 1954, he took 7th in Mariánské Lázně (Marienbad). The event (zonal) was won by Luděk Pachman. In 1960, he won in Kiruna (SWE-ch). In 1961, he won in Avesta (SWE-ch). In 1964, he won in Gothenburg (SWE-ch).

Lundin played for Sweden in nine official Chess Olympiads and once in 3rd unofficial Chess Olympiad at Munich 1936.

- In 1930, at fourth board in the 3rd Chess Olympiad in Hamburg (+10 -3 =4)
- In 1931, at fourth board in the 4th Chess Olympiad in Prague (+8 -3 =7)
- In 1933, at third board in the 5th Chess Olympiad in Folkestone (+7 -1 =6)
- In 1935, at third board in the 6th Chess Olympiad in Warsaw (+10 -2 =7)
- In 1936, at second board in the 3rd unofficial Chess Olympiad in Munich (+9 -3 =6)
- In 1937, at second board in the 7th Chess Olympiad in Stockholm (+4 -5 =7)
- In 1939, at second board in the 8th Chess Olympiad in Buenos Aires (+10 -5 =1)
- In 1952, at third board in the 10th Chess Olympiad in Helsinki (+5 -2 =6)
- In 1954, at second board in the 11th Chess Olympiad in Amsterdam (+4 -5 =6)
- In 1960, at second board in the 14th Chess Olympiad in Leipzig (+5 -3 =7)

He won four medals; team silver (Warsaw 1935) and bronze (Folkestone 1933), individual gold (Folkestone 1933) and bronze (Buenos Aires 1939).

He played in some international friendly matches; he won (1.5 : 0.5) against Bronstein at Stockholm 1954 (SWE–URS), won against Heikki Westerinen at Helsinki 1967 (SWE-FIN), won against Bogdan Pietrusiak at Ystad 1967 (SWE-POL).

Lundin was awarded the International Master title in 1950, and the Honorary Grandmaster title in 1983. He continued to participate in chess tournaments in his 80's. Over the course of his career, he won at least one game from such world class players as David Bronstein, Max Euwe, Reuben Fine, Salo Flohr, Rudolf Spielmann, and Miguel Najdorf.
