= Lajos Asztalos =

Hungarian chess player

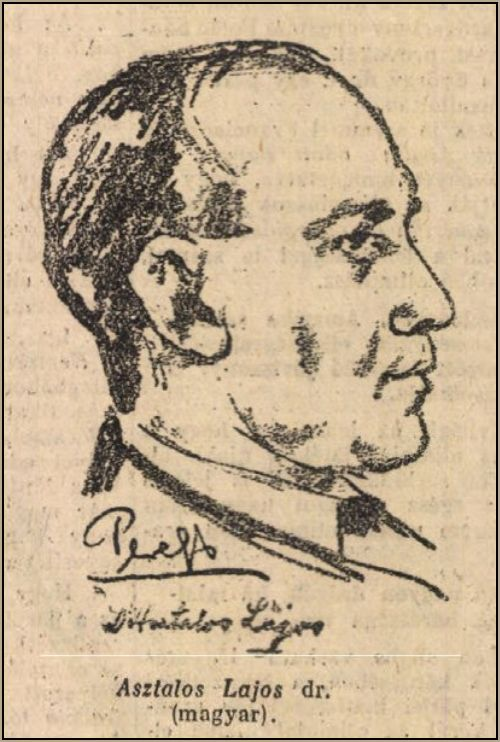

Personal information
- Born: July 29, 1889 Pécs, Hungary
- Died: November 1, 1956 (aged 67) Budapest, Hungary

Chess career
- Country: Hungary; Yugoslavia
- Title: International Master (1950); International Arbiter (1951)

Lajos Asztalos (Croatian: Ljudevit Astaloš; 29 July 1889 – 1 November 1956) was a Hungarian-Yugoslavian chess International Master, professor, and teacher of languages.

At the beginning of his career, he tied for sixth-eighth at the 1911 Hungarian Chess Championship; tied for 7–8th at Breslau 1912 (18th DSB–Congress, B tourn); took second, behind Gyula Breyer at the1912 Hungarian Championship; won at the 1913 Hungarian Championship; tied for 8–9th at Budapest 1913, took fifth at Mannheim 1914 (Hauptturnier A); took 4th at Vienna 1917 (Quadrangular), and took 5th at Kaschau 1918.

After World War I, he moved to the Kingdom of Serbs, Croats and Slovenes (later known as Yugoslavia). In 1923, he tied for sixth-seventh in Trieste. In 1924, he took third at the Hungarian Championship. In 1925, he took 5th in Budapest, and tied for 13–14th in Debrecen. In 1926, he took third, behind Hermanis Matisons and Savielly Tartakower, in Bardejov. In 1927 he took 4th in Kecskemét. In 1931, he took 13th in Bled. In 1934, he took sixth in Maribor. In 1935, he tied for 8–9th in Belgrade. In 1938, he tied for 5–7th in Ljubljana.

He represented Yugoslavia in four Chess Olympiads. In 1926, in 2nd unofficial Chess Olympiad in Budapest – the team won silver medal. In 1927, Asztalos played third board at the 1st Chess Olympiad in London (+4 –3 =8). In 1931, he played second board at the 4th Chess Olympiad in Prague (+7 –3 =6). Finally, in 1936, he played fourth board in the 3rd unofficial Chess Olympiad in Munich (+5 –3 =8).

During World War II, Asztalos played for Croatia in a match against Slovakia on first board with Ivan Vladimir Rohaček (1:1) in Zagreb in December 1941. He returned to Hungary in 1942. Asztalos became Vice President of the Hungarian Chess Union and Secretary of the FIDE Qualification Committee. He was a professor of philosophy and a languages teacher.

Asztalos was awarded the International Master (IM) title in 1950 and the International Arbiter (IA) title in 1951. He was the author of A sakkjáték elemei (Budapest 1951).

He died in Budapest during the Hungarian Revolution of 1956. Asztalos Memorial has been held regularly in Hungary since 1958 till 1971.

== Notable games ==
- Lajos Asztalos vs Alexander Alekhine, Bled (03) 1931, French Defense: Classical, Burn Variation Morozevich Line (C11), ½–½
- Lajos Asztalos vs Borislav Kostic, Bled 1931, Nimzowitsch Defense: Scandinavian, Advance Variation (B00), ½–½
- Geza Maroczy vs Lajos Asztalos, Bled 1931, Four Knights Game: Spanish Variation (C49), ½–½
