= Swedish Chess Championship =

Chess tournament in Sweden

The first Swedish Champion was Gustaf Nyholm, who won two matches against winners of national tournaments: Berndtsson in Göteborg and Löwenborg in Stockholm in 1917. Until 1931 Swedish Chess Championships were decided by match play. In the 1930s, Gideon Ståhlberg held the title in spite of results of the national tournaments. Since 1939, only the tournament is played as an official Swedish Championship.

== Matches (official Champions) ==
Year	Location	Result
1917	Stockholm	Otto Löwenborg 3 – Anton Olson 2
1917	Gothenburg	Gustaf Nyholm 3½ – Karl Berndtsson 1½
1917	Stockholm	Gustaf Nyholm 4 – Otto Löwenborg 1
1919	Stockholm	Gustaf Nyholm 2½ – Arthur Håkansson 2½
1919	Stockholm	Gustaf Nyholm 3½ – Anton Olson 1½
1921	Gothenburg	Gustaf Nyholm 2½ – Allan Nilsson 2½
1921	Stockholm	Anton Olson 3 – Gustaf Nyholm 2
1921	Stockholm	Gustaf Nyholm 3½ – Anton Olson 1½
1924	Gothenburg	Allan Nilsson 3 – Gustaf Nyholm 1
1927	Gothenburg	Allan Nilsson 2½ – Gösta Stoltz 2½
1929	Gothenburg	Gideon Ståhlberg 3 – Allan Nilsson 0
1931	Gothenburg	Gideon Ståhlberg 3 – Gösta Stoltz 3

== Tournaments (no champions) ==
Year	Location	Champion
1917	Stockholm	Otto Löwenborg; Anton Olson
1918	Gothenburg	Karl Berndtsson
1919	Malmö	Anton Olson
1920	Eskilstuna	Karl Berndtsson
1921	Jönköping	Karl Berndtsson; Gustaf Nyholm
1922	Gävle	Arthur Håkansson
1923	Uppsala	Allan Nilsson; Anton Olson
1924	Norrköping	Karl Olson
1925	Trollhättan	Olof Kinnmark
1926	Karlstad	Karl Berndtsson
1927	Örebro	Gösta Stoltz; Gideon Ståhlberg
1928	Hälsinborg	Gösta Stoltz
1929	Västerås	Einar Pettersson
1931	Uddevalla	Erik Lundin
1932	Karlskrona	Erik Lundin; Gideon Ståhlberg
1933	Lund	Nils Bergkvist; Gösta Danielsson; Gösta Forhaug; Gunnar Skarp
1934	Falun	Erik Lundin
1935	Härnösand	Gösta Stoltz; John B. Lindberg
1936	Borås	Ernst Larsson
1937	Stockholm	Ragnar Pettersson
1938	Kalmar	Erik Lundin

== Tournaments (official Champions) ==
Year	Location	Swedish Champion	U20 Champion	U16 Champion	U13 Champion	O60 Champion	O50 Champion	O65 Champion
1939	Stockholm	Gideon Ståhlberg						
1940 *	Stockholm	Nils Bergkvist						
1941	Gothenburg	Erik Lundin						
1942	Östersund	Erik Lundin						
1943	Malmö	Bengt Ekenberg						
1944	Lidköping	Stig Lundholm						
1945	Visby	Erik Lundin						
1946	Motala	Erik Lundin						
1947	Stockholm	Folke Ekström						
1948	Sundsvall	Folke Ekström						
1949	Eskilstuna	Kristian Sköld	Åke Westman					
1950	Kristianstad	Kristian Sköld	Sven Palmqvist					
1951	Halmstad	Gösta Stoltz	Sven Asker					
1952	Hålland	Gösta Stoltz	Åke Olsson					
1953	Örebro	Gösta Stoltz	Berndt Sehlstedt					
1954	Hälsingborg	Bengt-Eric Hörberg	Hans Brodén					
1955	Södertälje	Gösta Danielsson	Staffan Eriksson					
1956	Borås	Åke Stenborg	Ralph Halleröd					
1957	Stockholm	Zandor Nilsson	Hans-Ove Hålén					
1958	Växjö	Inge Johansson	Ove Kinnmark					
1959	Västerås	Kristian Sköld	Börje Jansson					
1960	Kiruna	Erik Lundin	Karl-Gustaf Dahl					
1961	Avesta	Erik Lundin	Lars Esselius					
1962	Örnsköldsvik	Bengt Ekenberg	Rune Litsberger					
1963	Karlskrona	Kristian Sköld	Lars Gösta Cederquist					
1964	Gothenburg	Erik Lundin	Jan Sibe					
1965	Falköping	Zandor Nilsson	lennart Liljedahl					
1966	Malmö	Martin Johansson	Gert Svensson					
1967	Stockholm	Rolf Martens	Axel Ornstein					
1968	Norrköping	Börje Jansson	Anders Wirgren					
1969	Sundsvall	Ulf Andersson	Jaan Eslon					
1970	Nässjö	Börje Jansson	Konstanty Kaiszauri					
1971	Eskilstuna	Sven Malmgren	Anders Larsson					
1972	Skellefteå	Axel Ornstein	Roland Ekström					
1973	Bollnäs	Axel Ornstein	Caspar Carleson					
1974	Lund	Magnus Wahlbom	Anders Wengholm					
1975	Gothenburg	Axel Ornstein	Dan Cramling					
1976	Motala	Harry Schüssler	Gösta Svenn					
1977	Stockholm	Axel Ornstein	Michael Wiedenkeller					
1978	Degerfors	Nils Gustav Renman; Harry Schüssler	Anders Lundin					
1979	Borås	Lars-Åke Schneider	Göran Marklund					
1980	Luleå	Nils-Gustav Renman	Peter Fransson					
1981	Ystad	Dan Cramling	Ferdinand Hellers					
1982	Gävle	Lars-Åke Schneider	Hans Jonsson					
1983	Karlskrona	Lars-Åke Schneider	Per Thorén					
1984	Linköping	Axel Ornstein	Richard Wessman					
1985	Uppsala	Ralf Åkesson	Rikard Winsnes	Teodor Hellborg				
1986	Malmö	Lars-Åke Schneider	Richard Wessman	Stefan Solbrand				
1987	Stockholm	Axel Ornstein	Pontus Sjödahl	Anders Burman				
1988	Norrköping	Axel Ornstein	Per Vernersson	Mikael Jonsson				
1989	Sundsvall	Jan Johansson	Jonas Berkhagen	Michael Wiander				
1990	Gothenburg	Michael Wiedenkeller	Anton Åberg	Erik Hedman				
1991	Helsingborg	Stellan Brynell	Johan Hellsten	Martin Nilsson				
1992	Borlänge	Lars Karlsson	Johan Eriksson	Johan Upmark				
1993	Lindesberg	Thomas Ernst	Mikael Jonsson	Robert Wikström				
1994	Haparanda	Richard Wessman	Erik Hedman	Tommy Andersson				
1995	Borlänge	Lars Degerman	Erik Malmstig	Björn Lundberg				
1996	Linköping	Robert Åström	Dennis Rylander	Jonas Morin				
1997	Haninge	Lars Degerman	Joel Åkesson	Nissim Laksman				
1998	Ronneby	Evgeny Agrest	Anders Olsson	Fredrik Holmberg				
1999	Lidköping	Ralf Åkesson	Dennis Rylander	Ulf Hammar	Anton Frisk Kockum			
2000	Örebro	Tom Wedberg	Anders Olsson	Erik Jacobson	Drazen Dragicevic			
2001	Linköping	Evgeny Agrest	Jonas Eriksson	Marta Nesterow	Drazen Dragicevic			
2002	Skara	Jonny Hector	Hans Tikkanen	Mikael Andersson Fraenkel	Christopher Lissäng			
2003	Umeå	Evgeny Agrest	Kezli Ong	Adam Blomqvist	Inna Agrest			
2004	Gothenburg	Evgeny Agrest	Bo Lindberg	Gustav Hedén	Börje Jansson			
2005	Gothenburg	Stellan Brynell	Rauan Sagit	Linus Centerström	Eric Vaarala	Ralph Halleröd		
2006	Gothenburg	Johan Hellsten	Axel Smith	Martin Alarik	Carl Eidenert	Ralph Halleröd		
2007	Stockholm	Tiger Hillarp Persson	Nils Grandelius	Simon Hänninger	Martin Lundberg	Bo Kyhle		
2008	Växjö	Tiger Hillarp Persson	Simon Hänninger	Erik Thörn	Linus Johansson	Bo Plato		
2009	Kungsör	Emanuel Berg	Arash Abdollah Zadeh	Harald-Berggren Torell	Sam Kassani	Nils Åke Malmdin		
2010	Lund	Emanuel Berg	Jonathan Westerberg	Frans Dahlstedt	Tom Rydström	Bengt Hammar		
2011	Västerås	Hans Tikkanen	Eric Vaarala	Mattis Olofsson-Dolk	Martin Jogstad	Nils Åke Malmdin		
2012	Falun	Hans Tikkanen	Philip Lindgren	Joar Ölund	Joakim Mörling	Bengt Hammar		
2013	Örebro	Hans Tikkanen	Carl Cederstam-Barsk	Martin Jogstad	Lisa Fredholm	Jan-Olov Lind		
2014	Borlänge	Daniel Semcesen	Joar Ölund	Joakim Mörling	Klemens Ng	Nils-Åke Malmdin		
2015	Sunne	Nils Grandelius	Joakim Mörling	Isak Storme	Ludvig Carlsson	Lars Blomström		
2016	Uppsala	Erik Blomqvist	Martin Jogstad	Santiago Grueso Cordoba	Gabriel Nguyen	Åke Westin		
2017	Stockholm	Hans Tikkanen	Seo Jung-min	Leo Crevatin	Gustav Törngren		Luis Couso	Nils-Åke Malmdin
2018	Ronneby	Hans Tikkanen	Kaan Kücüksarı	Jacob Jönsson	Arvin Rasti		Dan Cramling	Juan Bellon
2019	Eskilstuna	Erik Blomqvist	Isak Storme	Gabriel Nguyen	Axel Falkevall		Krister Lagerborg	Juan Bellon
2020		Cancelled	Cancelled	Cancelled	Cancelled	Cancelled	Cancelled	
2021	Helsingborg	Seo Jung-min	Ludvig Carlsson	Cancelled	Cancelled	Cancelled	Cancelled	Cancelled
2022	Uppsala	Jonny Hector	William Olsson	Sebastian Persson	Oscar Morell		Håkan Svensson	Björn Gillefalk
2023	Helsingborg	Vitaly Sivuk	Joar Östlund	Lavinia Valcu	Rohan Gore		Max Wahlund	Per Söderberg
2024	Växjö	Vitaly Sivuk	Axel Falkevall	Melvin Ral Lustig	Svante Nödtveidt		Bengt Lindberg	Kaj Engström
2025	Uppsala	Seo Jung-min	Hugo Wernberg	Lo Ljungros	David León		Per Vernersson	Jan Johansson
2026	Jönköping	Edvin Trost	Vidar Grahn	Alfons Jouandet-Dahlén	William Mårdh		Gösta Svenn	Håkan Rothén

- Tournament at Stockholm 1940 was unofficial Swedish championship.

== Women ==
Year	Champion
1998	Eva Berglund
