= Karl Berndtsson =

Swedish chess player

- Country: Sweden
- Born: March 16, 1892; Gothenburg, Sweden
- Died: September 29, 1943 (aged 51); Gothenburg, Sweden

Karl Mathias Berndtsson Kullberg (16 March 1892 – 29 September 1943) was a Swedish chess master who was born and died in Gothenburg.

He won at Copenhagen 1916, and lost a match for the Swedish Chess Championship to Gustaf Nyholm (1½–3½) in 1917. He was first in the national tournaments in 1918, 1920, 1921 (jointly), and 1926. He took 14th at Göteborg 1920 (Paul Johner won), won Nordic Chess Championship at Oslo 1928, and took 6th at Örebro 1935 (Alexander Alekhine won).

Berndtsson played for Sweden in three Chess Olympiads:

- In the 3rd Olympiad at Hamburg 1930 (+7−7=2);
- In the 4th Olympiad at Prague 1931 (+5−5=8);
- In the 5th Olympiad at Folkestone 1933 (+6−3=5);

and won team bronze medal in 1933.
