= Hindås =

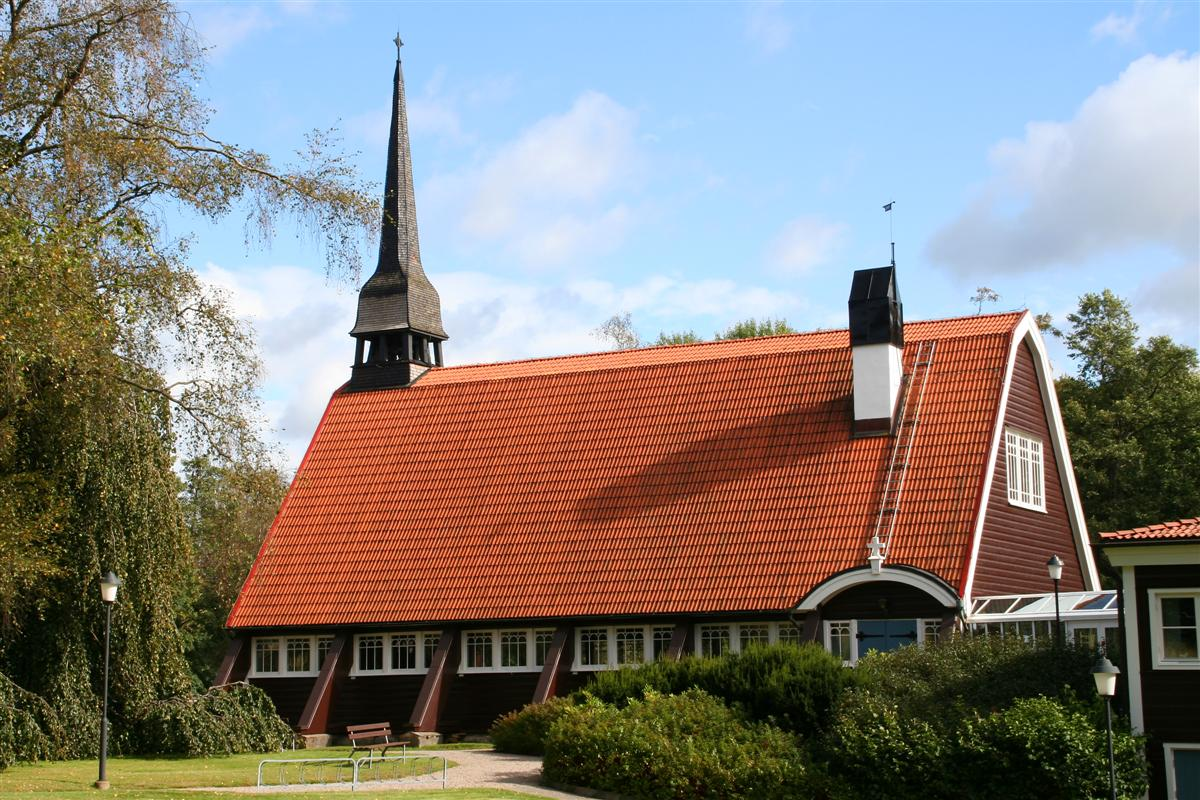
- Hindås church

- Location within Västra Götaland Location within Sweden
- Coordinates: 57°42′N 12°27′E
- Country: Sweden
- Province: Västergötland
- County: Västra Götaland County
- Municipality: Härryda Municipality

Area
  - Total: 2.91 km^{2} (1.12 sq mi)

Population (31 December 2015)
  - Total: 2.901
  - Density: 771/km^{2} (2,000/sq mi)
- Time zone: UTC+1 (CET)
  - Summer (DST): UTC+2 (CEST)

Hindås is a town centre in Härryda Municipality, about 35 km east of Gothenburg. A resort is at Västra Nedsjön, and Mölndalsån starts here. There is a railway station between Gothenburg and Borås, part of the coast to the coastal path. It was opened on December 15, 1894.

== History ==
Hindås has many buildings from the early 20th century in the Jugend and the National Romance styles. Examples are the church, the station house and several villas that were built as holiday homes for well-to-do Gothenburgers. Similar areas that grew along the same railway are Långenäs and Pixbo .

The sports venue was opened on 26 May 1927 by Ivar Berger, a lawyer of Gothenburg. Two boys from the field played an opening match.

Hindås is high and used to be snow-proof. Therefore, the resort was a popular winter getaway for Westerners and one of Sweden's major backhoppers. There are two bounces in the vicinity of the hotel Hindåsgården. Since the spring of 2015, the Erik Boströms Foundation has been working for the preservation of the jumps. The big jumpback built in concrete in 1932 is a landmark for Hindås and collection in progress to organize lighting of the slope.

During Hindås's peak as a tourist resort, there were at least twelve hotels and guesthouses. There are now two left, Hindåsgården (former Idrottsgården) and Hjortviken (formerly Hindås Hotell and then Turisthotell). Hindås Sanatorium and Turisthotell opened in 1906 and was then Northern Europe's largest wooden hotel. This large building burned down in 1935 and the year before, Idrettsgården had burned down. Both hotels were rebuilt but not as wooden buildings.

== Sports and outdoor ==
Hindås Kanot & Friluftsklubb, Hindås Ski Club, Hindås Innebandyklubb, Hindås Scoutkår, IFK Hindås Football, Hindås Gymnastikförening and IFK Hindås Schack are some associations in Hindås.

The wildlife trail is a hiking trail which is now about 42 km long. It runs from the station to Skatås Motion Centre in Gothenburg.

In 1958, the Brazilian (including Pelé) and Soviet football clubs had their World Cup camp in Hindås.
