= Stig Lundholm =

Swedish chess player

Stig Gustav Lundholm (14 November 1917 – 19 May 2009) was a Swedish chess master.

Lundholm was born in Luleå, Sweden. He won at Stockholm 1942, tied with Folke Ekström, ahead of both Gösta Stoltz and Erik Lundin, took second place behind Ekström at Stockholm 1943/44, and won at Lidköping 1944 (Swedish Chess Championship) ahead of Paul Keres. He was the Swedish correspondence chess champion in 1948 and received the chess title of International Master of Correspondence Chess in 1983.
