= Nordic Chess Championship =

Biennial chess tournament

The Nordic Chess Championship (Nordiska Schackkongressen) is a biennial chess tournament which determines the champion of the Nordic countries. The first edition took place in Stockholm in 1897.

== History ==
The winners in the Nordic Championship in 1934 and 1936, Aron Nimzowitsch and Erik Lundin, got the Nordiske kongresmestre title, as the champion of 1930, Erik Andersen, defended his title with 3–3 against Gideon Ståhlberg at Copenhagen 1934 and lost it by 2½–3½ against Erik Lundin at Copenhagen 1937.

Several of the Nordic Championship have been arranged as part of an open tournament, where the best placed player from a Nordic country becomes Nordic champion even if that person did not win the event. For example, the Nordic Champion of 2011, Jon Ludvig Hammer, finished fifth in the Reykjavik Open that doubled as the Nordic Championship since the four players who finished ahead of him were from Ukraine, the Netherlands, and Poland and were thus ineligible for the Nordic Champion title.

== Winners ==
#	Year	City	Nordic champion
1	1897	Stockholm	Sven Otto Svensson (Sweden)
2	1899	Copenhagen	Jørgen Møller (Denmark)
3	1901	Gothenburg	Jørgen Møller (Denmark)
4	1903	Kristiania	Johannes Giersing (Denmark)
5	1905	Stockholm	A. H. Pettersson (Sweden)
6	1907	Copenhagen	Paul Saladin Leonhardt (German Empire)
7	1909	Gothenburg	Milan Vidmar (Austria)
8	1912	Stockholm	Alexander Alekhine (Russian Empire)
9	1916	Copenhagen	Paul Johner (Switzerland)
10	1917	Kristiania	Gustaf Nyholm (Sweden)
11	1919	Gothenburg	Rudolf Spielmann (Austria); Anton Olson (Sweden)
12	1924	Copenhagen	Aron Nimzowitsch (Denmark)
13	1928	Oslo	Karl Berndtsson (Sweden)
14	1929	Gothenburg	Gideon Ståhlberg (Sweden)
15	1930	Stockholm	Erik Andersen (Denmark)
16	1934	Copenhagen	Aron Nimzowitsch (Denmark) *)
*)	1934	Copenhagen	Erik Andersen (Denmark)
17	1936	Helsinki	Erik Lundin (Sweden) *)
*)	1937	Copenhagen	Erik Lundin (Sweden)
18	1938	Örebro	Gideon Ståhlberg (Sweden)
19	1939	Oslo	Gideon Ståhlberg (Sweden); Erik Lundin (Sweden)
20	1946	Copenhagen	Osmo Kaila (Finland)
21	1947	Helsinki	Eero Böök (Finland)
22	1948	Örebro	Baldur Möller (Iceland)
23	1950	Reykjavík	Baldur Möller (Iceland)
24	1953	Esbjerg	Friðrik Ólafsson (Iceland)
25	1955	Oslo	Bent Larsen (Denmark)
26	1957	Helsinki	Olof Sterner (Sweden)
27	1959	Örebro	Svein Johannessen (Norway)
28	1961	Reykjavík	Ingi R. Johannsson (Iceland)
29	1963	Odense	Bjørn Brinck-Claussen (Denmark); Manne Joffe (Sweden)
30	1965	Oslo	Freysteinn Thorbergsson (Iceland)
31	1967	Hangö	Ragnar Hoen (Norway)
32	1969	Lidköping	Ole Jakobsen (Denmark)
33	1971	Reykjavík	Friðrik Ólafsson (Iceland)
34	1973	Grenå	Bent Larsen (Denmark)
35	1975	Sandefjord	Sejer Holm (Denmark)
36	1977	Kiljava	Lars-Erik Pettersson (Sweden)
37	1979	Sundsvall	Christer Niklasson (Sweden)
38	1981	Reykjavík	Knut Jøran Helmers (Norway)
39	1983	Esbjerg	Curt Hansen (Denmark)
40	1985	Gjøvik	Simen Agdestein (Norway)
41	1987	Tórshavn	Margeir Petursson (Iceland)
42	1989	Espoo	Simen Agdestein (Norway)
43	1992	Östersund	Simen Agdestein (Norway)
44	1995	Reykjavík	Curt Hansen (Denmark)
45	1997	Reykjavík	Jóhann Hjartarson (Iceland)
46	1999	Copenhagen	Tiger Hillarp Persson (Sweden)
47	2001	Bergen	Evgeny Agrest (Sweden)
48	2003	Aarhus	Evgeny Agrest (Sweden); Curt Hansen (Denmark)
49	2005	Vammala	Evgeny Agrest (Sweden)
50	2007	Copenhagen	Emanuel Berg (Sweden)
51	2009	Copenhagen	Peter Heine Nielsen (Denmark)
52	2011	Reykjavík	Jon Ludvig Hammer (Norway)
53	2013	Køge	Axel Smith (Sweden)
54	2016	Sastamala	Erik Blomqvist (Sweden)
55	2017	Växjö	Jóhann Hjartarson (Iceland)
56	2019	Sarpsborg	Frode Urkedal (Norway)
57	2022	Jyväskylä	Seo Jung-min (Sweden)
