= Paul Johner =

Swiss chess player

Personal information
- Born: September 10, 1887 Zürich, Switzerland
- Died: October 25, 1938 (aged 51) Berlin, Germany

Chess career
- Country: Switzerland

Paul F. Johner (10 September 1887, in Zürich, Switzerland – 25 October 1938, in Berlin, Germany) was a Swiss chess master.

A noted musician (violinist), elder brother of Hans Johner, he won the Swiss Championship six times, namely in 1907 (joint), 1908 (joint), 1925, 1928 (joint), 1930 and 1932 (joint), and played for Switzerland at second board in 3rd unofficial Chess Olympiad at Munich 1936 (+4 –7 =6).

He played in many international tournaments. In 1904 he tied for 12-13th in Coburg (DSB Congress, Hauptturnier A). In 1905/06 he took 2nd in New York. In 1907 he took 21st in Carlsbad (Akiba Rubinstein won). In 1908 he took 14th in Vienna (Oldřich Duras, Géza Maróczy and Carl Schlechter won), and took 8th in Düsseldorf (Frank Marshall won). In 1909 he took 4th in Berlin. In 1911 he tied for 19th-21st in Carlsbad (Richard Teichmann won).

In 1916, Paul Johner won the 9th Nordic Chess Championship at Copenhagen. He shared for 1st with Walter John at Berlin 1917, and won at Göteborg 1920 (B tourn).

He was individual best alongside Rudolf Spielmann at the strong Scheveningen tournament 1923, organised to celebrate 50th anniversary of The Royal Chess Federation, above players like Richard Réti, Géza Maróczy, Jacques Mieses, Edgar Colle, Frederick Yates, or young Max Euwe (20 players). A brand new system was introduced in this event, which since then is known as the 'Scheveningen system' after the suburbs of Hague where the tournament took place. Every player from the first team played against every player of the second team (i.e. Foreigners versus The Netherlands). Paul Johner remained the only unbeaten player, scoring 8.5/10.

Paul Johner triumphed at the Trieste International Festival 1923 (organized as a singular invitation tournament), finishing clear first in the top group ahead of 2. Esteban Canal, 3. Frederick Yates, 4. Siegbert Tarrasch, 5. Stefano Rosselli, 6.= Lajos Asztalos, etc. (12 players).

Paul Johner also took the Berlin 1924 tournament, a Quadrangular, ahead of Akiba Rubinstein, Richard Teichmann, and Jacques Mieses.

In 1925, he finished joint second after Hans Kmoch, together with Savielly Tartakower (12 players, including Ernst Grünfeld, David Przepiorka, Lajos Steiner and Lajos Asztalos) at Debrecen.

According to the retrospective (historical) Chessmetrics ratings, Paul Johner was ranked number 10 in the world in January 1921.
