= Gideon Ståhlberg =

Swedish chess grandmaster (1908–1967)

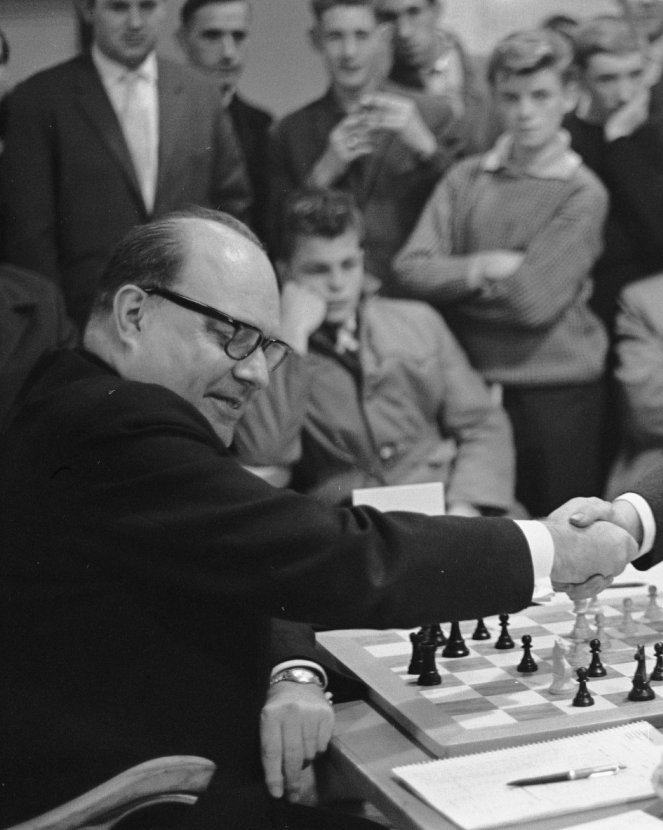
- Ståhlberg in 1961

Personal information
- Born: Anders Gideon Tom Ståhlberg; 26 January 1908 Surte, Gothenburg and Bohus County, Sweden
- Died: 26 May 1967 (aged 59) Leningrad, Soviet Union

Chess career
- Country: Sweden
- Title: Grandmaster (1950)

Anders Gideon Tom Ståhlberg (26 January 1908 – 26 May 1967) was a Swedish chess player. He was among the inaugural recipients of the title International Grandmaster from FIDE in 1950.

He won the Swedish Chess Championship of 1927, became Nordic champion in 1929, and held it until 1939.

Ståhlberg came to fame when he won matches against star players Rudolf Spielmann and Aron Nimzowitsch in 1933 and 1934 respectively, and came third (after Alexander Alekhine) in Dresden 1936, and second (after Reuben Fine) in Stockholm 1937. In 1938 he drew a match against Paul Keres.

Following the Chess Olympiad in Buenos Aires 1939, he stayed in Argentina until 1948, where he won many tournaments, some of them in competition with Miguel Najdorf: Mar del Plata 1941 (ahead of Najdorf and Erich Eliskases), Buenos Aires 1941 (tied with Najdorf), Buenos Aires 1947 (ahead of Najdorf, Eliskases and Max Euwe).

His best results after returning to Europe were: the Interzonal of Saltsjöbaden 1948 (6th, becoming a candidate), the Candidates tournament of Budapest 1950 (7th), Amsterdam 1950 (3rd), Budapest 1952 (3rd), the Interzonal of Saltsjöbaden 1952 (5th, again becoming a candidate)

Ståhlberg umpired in the five World Championships between 1957 and 1963.

In 1967 he travelled to Leningrad to take part in an international tournament, the October Revolution 50 Tournament. However, Ståhlberg died before playing his first game. He was buried in Gothenburg.

Ståhlberg published more than ten chess books (some of them originally in Spanish):

- Schack och schackmästare, 1937 (Chess and Chess Masters, 1955)
- El gambito de dama, 1942 (Queen's gambit)
- Partidas clásicas de Capablanca (La perfección en ajedrez), 1943 (with Paulino Alles Monasterio) (Classic games of Capablanca, perfection in chess)
- I kamp med världseliten, 1958 (In battle against the world elite)
- Strövtåg i schackvärlden (Excursions in the world of chess, 1965)
- Tal-Botvinnik II match, 1969
- Modern spelöppningsteori i schack (Modern opening theory in chess)
- Svenska schackmästare (Swedish chess champions)
