= 1941 in chess =

Below is a list of events in chess in the year 1941.

== Chess events in brief ==
- Basic Chess Endings by Reuben Fine was published.
- 29 August 1941 – Gideon Ståhlberg played a 400-game simultaneous exhibition in Buenos Aires; 364 wins, 14 draws, 22 losses.
- 8–14 September 1941 – Europaturnier held in Munich, was organised by Ehrhardt Post, the Chief Executive of Nazi Grossdeutscher Schachbund. Max Euwe had declined the invitation for München 1941 due to his "occupational obligations", as manager of a groceries business. This time he refused to participate, because Alexander Alekhine was invited. Euwe mentioned futile reasons. The real motive was Alekhine's offence of Euwe in his anti-Semitic articles. Alekhine wrote six Nazi articles which first appeared in the Paris newspaper Pariser Zeitung in March 1941. He wrote a series of articles for the Deutsche Zeitung in den Niederlanden called "Jewish and Aryan Chess." The articles were reproduced in Deutsch Schachzeitung. Among others, Alekhine had written about the "Jewish clique" around Euwe in World Chess Championship 1935.

The Munich 1941 chess tournament was won by Gösta Stoltz, who scored a spectacular victory (1½ points ahead of Alekhine and Erik Lundin), and won 1,000 Reichsmarks. His trophy (donated by the Ministerpräsident Ludwig Siebert) of Meissen porcelain is worth close to $1,000.

== Tournaments ==
- Sydney (the New South Wales championship), won by Lajos Steiner ahead of Gary Koshnitsky and Cecil Purdy, 1940/41.
- Beverwijk (the 4th Hoogovenschaaktoernoi) won by Arthur Wijnans, January 1941.
- Lviv won by Eduard Gerstenfeld ahead of Izaak Appel, Henryk Friedman, Emanuel Rubinstein and Izaak Schächter, January/February 1941.
- Groningen won by Salo Landau
- Baarn won by Max Euwe ahead of Hans Kmoch
- Amsterdam won by Euwe ahead of Nicolaas Cortlever
- Mar del Plata won by Gideon Ståhlberg followed by Miguel Najdorf, Erich Eliskases, etc., March 1941.
- Leningrad/Moscow (the Soviet Absolute Championship), won by Mikhail Botvinnik followed by Paul Keres, Vasily Smyslov, Isaac Boleslavsky, Andor Lilienthal, and Igor Bondarevsky, March 23 – April 29, 1941.
- Moscow (the Moscow City Chess Championship), won by Alexander Kotov
- Riga (the 1st Soviet Latvian Chess Championship), won by Alexander Koblencs ahead of Fricis Apšenieks
- Vilnius (the 1st Soviet Lithuanian Chess Championship), won by Isakas Vistaneckis.
- Tallinn (the Estonian Chess Championship), won by Johannes Türn and Feliks Kibbermann.
- Bucaramanga (the Colombian Chess Championship), won by Miguel Cuéllar
- Buenos Aires (Bodas de Plata), won by Ståhlberg and Najdorf, followed by Paulino Frydman, Paul Michel, Carlos Guimard, Hermann Pilnik, etc.
- Buenos Aires won by Frydman ahead of Moshe Czerniak
- Buenos Aires won by Najdorf followed by Czerniak, Pilnik, Michel, etc.
- Montevideo won by Erich Eliskases followed by Markas Luckis, Ludwig Engels, Héctor Rossetto, etc., May 1941.
- Hamburg won by Klaus Junge and Herbert Heinicke
- Bad Elster won by Junge ahead of Rudolf Palme and Erich Weinitschke, start 11 May 1941.
- Graz won by Heinicke and Poschauko, start 15 June 1941.
- São Pedro won by Eliskases and Guimard, followed by Engels, Frydman, Luckis, Mariano Castillo, Aristide Gromer, Julio Bolbochán, etc., 2–26 July 1941.
- Krefeld won by Efim Bogoljubow, 5–12 July 1941.
- Bad Oeynhausen (the 8th German Chess Championship), won by Paul Felix Schmidt and Junge, followed by Kurt Richter, Hans Müller, Georg Kieninger, etc., start 3 August 1941.
- Ventnor City won by Jacob Levin ahead of Fred Reinfeld
- St. Louis (the 42nd U.S. Open), won by Reuben Fine ahead of Herman Steiner, July 1941.
- Hamilton (New York State Chess Association Championship), won by Fine ahead of Arnold Denker, Isaac Kashdan and Samuel Reshevsky, 16–23 August 1941.
- New York City (Marshall Chess Club Championship), won by Fine followed by Frank Marshall, Sidney Bernstein, Reinfeld, Herbert Seidman, Edward Lasker, etc.
- Kalmar won by Rudolf Spielmann
- Madrid (the Spanish Chess Championship, Challenge), won by Ramón Rey Ardid
- Paris (the French Chess Championship), won by Robert Crépeaux
- Florence won by Vincenzo Castaldi and Stefano Rosselli del Turco
- Budapest (the Hungarian Chess Championship), won by Géza Füster ahead of Gedeon Barcza and Pál Réthy
- Prague (Kautsky Memorial), won by Karel Opočenský ahead of Miroslav Katětov and Karel Treybal
- Prague won by František Zíta
- Česká Třebová won by Emil Richter
- Brno won by Florian and Friedrich Sämisch
- Trenčianske Teplice won by Jan Foltys ahead of József Szily and Ludovit Potuček
- Holešov won by Foltys
- Mährisch-Ostrau won by Foltys
- Gothenburg (the Swedish Chess Championship), won by Erik Lundin ahead of Gösta Stoltz and Olof Kinnmark
- Munich (the 2nd Europaturnier), won by Stoltz ahead of Lundin and Alexander Alekhine, Bogoljubow, Bjørn Nielsen, Kurt Richter, Foltys, etc., 8–14 September 1941.
- Kraków/Warsaw (the 2nd GG-ch), won by Alekhine and Schmidt, 5–19 October 1941.
- Winnipeg (the 45th Canadian Chess Championship), won by Daniel Yanofsky, October 1941.
- Kraków (Championship of the city), won by Paul Mross, November 1941.
- Moscow (the Moscow City Chess Championship), won by Isaak Mazel ahead of Vladimirs Petrovs, 1941/42.

== Matches ==
- Max Euwe beat Efim Bogoljubow (6.5 : 3.5) in Karlsbad, Protectorate of Bohemia and Moravia.
- Paul Felix Schmidt beat Klaus Junge (3.5 : 0.5) in Bromberg, Germany.
- Johannes Türn beat Feliks Kibbermann (3.5 : 0.5) in Tallinn, Estonia.
- Jan Foltys drew with Karel Opočenský (6 : 6) in Prague.
- Samuel Reshevsky defeated Israel Albert Horowitz (9.5 : 6.5) in New York.
- Carlos Guimard beat Carlos Maderna (8 : 1) in La Plata, Argentina.
- Albéric O'Kelly de Galway drew with Victor Soultanbeieff (1 : 1) in Belgium.

== Team matches ==
- 7–8 December, Zagreb: Croatia vs. Slovakia 10-6 (4½-3½, 5½-2½)

(Asztalos 01 Rohaček; Rabar 1½ Potuček; Tekavčić 11 Ujtelky; Šubarić 11 Pazman; Jerman 0½ Miština; M.Filipčić 00 Lauda; Petek 11 Štulir; B.Filipčić ½½ Stanek)

== Births ==
- 14 January – Oscar Quiñones in Lima, Peruvian chess player
- 25 April – Raymond Weinstein in Brooklyn, American chess player
- 3 May – Nona Gaprindashvili in Zugdidi, Georgia, Women's World Champion (1962–1978), first female GM
- 16 June – Tõnu Õim in Tallinn, Estonian correspondence GM
- 2 August – Jacob Murey in Moscow, Israeli GM
- 11 August – Alla Kushnir in Moscow, Israeli WGM, several-time challenger for the Women's Championship
- 3 October – Victor Palciauskas in Kaunas, American correspondence GM, World Correspondence Champion 1978–1984
- 10 September – Rosendo Balinas Jr., Filipino GM
- 13 December – Bessel Kok, Dutch chess organizer
- 30 December – Bruno Parma in Ljubljana, Slovene/Yugoslav GM

== Deaths ==
- Jakub Kolski died of starvation in the Warsaw Ghetto.
- Izaak Towbin died in the Warsaw Ghetto.
- Leon Kremer died in the General Government.
- Josef Cukierman committed suicide in France.
- Konstantin Vygodchikov died in Belarus.
- František Treybal died in the Protectorate of Bohemia and Moravia
- 11 January – Emanuel Lasker died in Manhattan, New York. World Chess Champion in the period 1894–1921.
- 25 April – Fricis Apšenieks died of tuberculosis in Riga. Latvian champion 1926/27 and 1934.
- 2 May – Ignatz von Popiel died in Lviv.
- after 22 June – Izaak Appel disappeared and probably died in a Nazi concentration camp, the District Galicia of General Government.
- 12 July – Charles Jaffe died in Brooklyn, New York. Former New York State champion and chess editor.
- 13 July – Ilmar Raud died of starvation in Buenos Aires, Argentina (in exile). Estonian champion in 1934 and 1939.
- August – Aron Zabłudowski killed by Nazis in Białystok, Poland.
- 3 September – Alexander Ilyin-Genevsky died, according to the Soviet official sources, on Lake Ladoga on a ship in a German air raid (he was the only one killed on the barge, which was displaying Red Cross flags) during the Siege of Leningrad, but is believed by some to have fallen victim to the Stalinist repression as the majority of the Old Guard of revolutionists. Three-time Leningrad City champion in 1925 (jointly), 1926 and 1929.
- 27 September – Juan Corzo died in Havana. Cuban champion in 1898, 1902, 1907, 1912, and 1918.
- 2 October – Karel Treybal arrested on 30 May, imprisoned and later charged with concealing weapons for use by resistance forces and the illegal possession of a pistol. He was condemned to death and executed by the Nazis in Prague, the Protectorate of Bohemia and Moravia.
- 3 October – Frederick Hamilton-Russell died in Cleobury North, England. President of British Chess Federation.
- 16 October – Antanas Gustaitis was caught attempting to cross the border on 4 March, arrested by NKVD, and taken to Moscow where he was shot. Lithuanian champion in 1922.
- 29 December – Boris Koyalovich died during the siege of Leningrad.
- 29 December – Vsevolod Rauzer died during the siege of Leningrad. Ukrainian champion in 1927 and 1933 (jointly).
