= Amos Pokorný =

Czech legionnaire and chess master

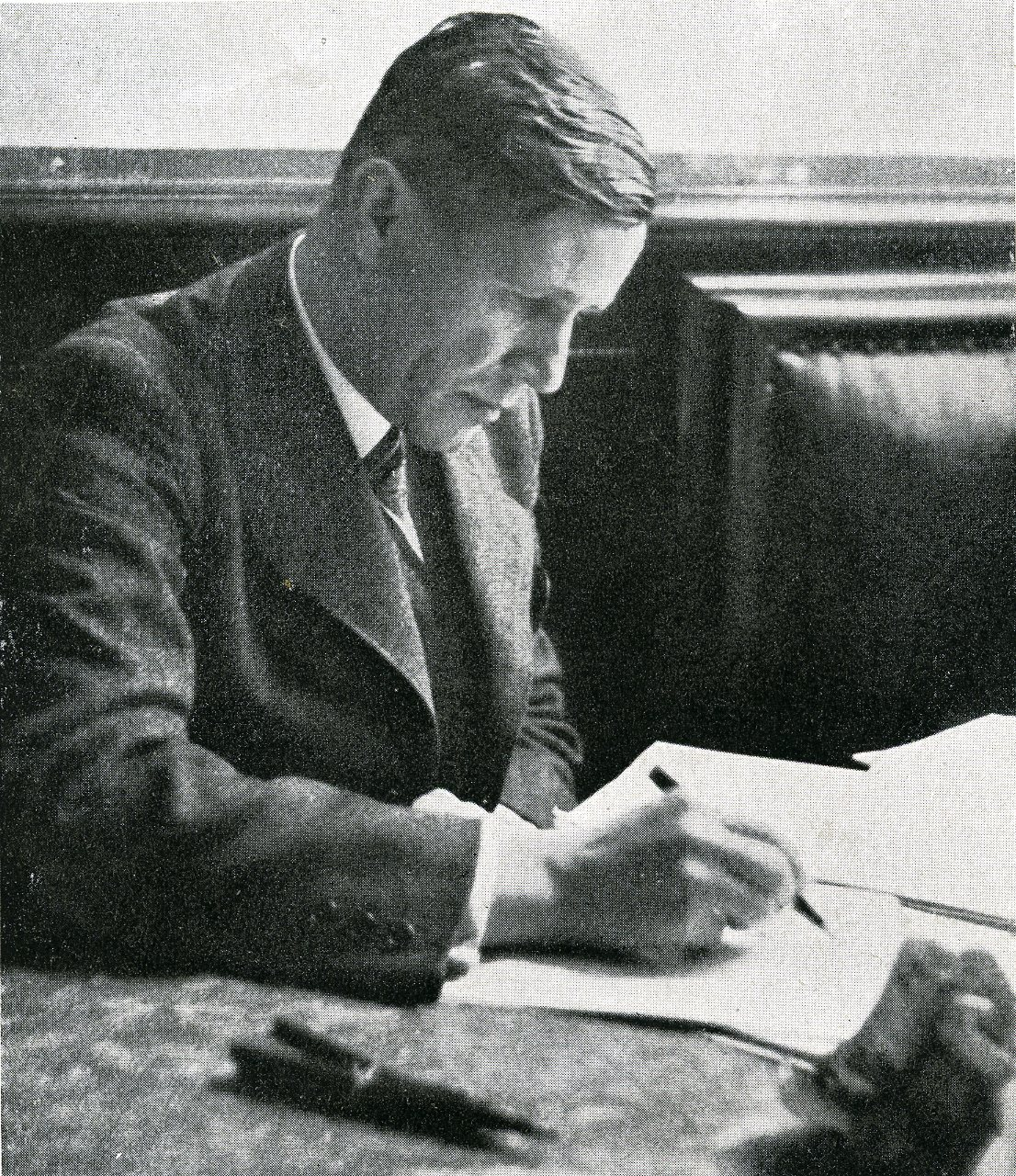
Amos Pokorný

Amos Pokorný (March 1890 – August 18, 1949) was a Czech legionnaire and chess master.

He shared 1st at Pilsen (Plzeň) 1911, tied for 4th–7th at Böhmisch Trübau (Česká Třebová) 1913, and took 8th at Jungbunzlau (Mladá Boleslav) 1913 (Bohemian Championship, Karel Hromádka won).

After World War I, he took 2nd, behind Max Walter, at Pardubice (Pardubitz) 1923 (Czechoslovak Chess Championship), took 11th at Moravská Ostrava (Mährisch Ostrau) 1923 (Emanuel Lasker won), tied for 3rd–5th at Bratislava 1925 (CSR-ch, Richard Réti won), took 9th at Trenčianske Teplice (Trentschin-Teplitz) 1926 (Boris Kostić and Karl Gilg won), took 4th at České Budějovice 1927 (CSR-ch, Karel Opočenský won), took 9th at Trenčianske Teplice 1928 (Kostić won), tied for 3rd–4th at Brno 1929 (CSR-ch, Opočenský won), tied for 3rd–4th at Prague 1933 (Army) and shared 1st with Salo Flohr at Mnichovo Hradiště (Münchengrätz) 1933 (CSR-ch).

Pokorny played for Czechoslovakia in Chess Olympiads:

- In the 1st Chess Olympiad at London 1927 (+5 –5 =2);
- In the 2nd Chess Olympiad at The Hague 1928 (+4 –3 =5);
- In the 3rd Chess Olympiad at Hamburg 1930 (+6 –5 =3);
- In 3rd unofficial Chess Olympiad at Munich 1936 (+8 –5 =3).

During World War II, he took 11th at Rakovník 1940 (Bohemia&Moravia-ch, Jan Foltys won), and tied for 9th-10th at Zlín 1943 (Čeněk Kottnauer won).
