= František Blatný =

Czech chess player

Personal information
- Born: 2 April 1933
- Died: 16 December 2015 (aged 82)

Chess career
- Country: Czechoslovakia; Czech Republic
- Peak rating: 2375 (July 1995)

František Blatný (2 April 1933 – 16 December 2015), was a Czech chess player, Czechoslovak Chess Championship medalist (1962, 1964), European Team Chess Championship team medalist (1957).

== Biography ==
In Czechoslovak Chess Championship František Blatný for the first time took part in 1954. In 1962 he became a bronze medalist, and two years later, in 1964, he shared first place with Vlastimil Jansa, but lost to him the additional match for the title of champion. From 1965 to May 2011, he managed the chess section in the oldest newspaper Brno Rovnost.

František Blatný played for Czechoslovakia:

- in Chess Olympiads participated 2 times (1962-1964);
- in European Team Chess Championships participated 2 times (1957, 1970) and won team bronze medal (1957);
- in World Student Team Chess Championships participated 4 times (1955, 1957-1959) and won 2 team bronze medal (1957, 1958).

He was a father of grandmaster Pavel Blatný.
