= Prague 1908 chess tournament =

The first International Prague Chess Tournament was held in honour of the sixtieth anniversary of Franz Joseph I of Austria's elevation as monarch to the Austria-Hungary Empire. Twenty great masters played in the pavilion of the Chamber of Commerce and Trade in Prague, from May 17 to June 13, 1908.

The representative of the executive board of the Jubilee Exhibition, president L. Bondy greeted tournament competitors and numerous guests in Czech, German, French and English. J. Krautstengl and Dr. G. Bergmann spoke for the presidium of the committee and they expressed their gratitude to the executive board for organizing tournaments. Official organizers were H. Pollak and K. Anderle, whereas referees Karel Traxler and Viktor Tietz had decided to whom two prices for the best games, of 200 and 300 Crowns, will be given. The money was donated by Baron Albert Salomon von Rothschild. The umpire was Dr. A. Klir.

== Master Tournament ==
The results and standings:

Prague 1908
#	Player	1	2	3	4	5	6	7	8	9	10	11	12	13	14	15	16	17	18	19	20	Total
1-2	Oldřich Důras (Bohemia)	x	½	0	½	0	½	1	1	1	1	1	1	1	½	½	1	0	1	1	1	13½
1-2	Carl Schlechter (Austria)	½	x	½	½	½	½	½	0	1	½	1	1	1	1	1	1	1	½	1	½	13½
3	Milan Vidmar (Austria)	1	½	x	0	½	0	0	½	½	1	1	½	½	1	1	1	1	1	1	1	13
4	Akiba Rubinstein (Poland)	½	½	1	x	½	0	1	½	1	0	½	1	½	1	1	½	½	½	1	1	12½
5	Richard Teichmann (German Empire)	1	½	½	½	x	½	½	½	½	½	0	½	½	1	1	1	½	½	1	1	12
6	Géza Maróczy (Transleithania)	½	½	1	1	½	x	0	½	½	0	½	½	½	½	1	1	½	1	½	1	11½
7-9	Paul Saladin Leonhardt (German Empire)	0	½	1	0	½	1	x	½	½	0	1	½	½	½	0	1	½	1	1	1	11
7-9	Frank Marshall (United States)	0	1	½	½	½	½	½	x	½	0	½	0	½	½	1	1	1	1	1	½	11
7-9	Gersz Salwe (Poland)	0	0	½	0	½	½	½	½	x	1	1	½	0	1	1	½	1	1	½	1	11
10	Dawid Janowski (France)	0	½	0	1	½	1	1	1	0	x	0	1	1	0	0	1	½	1	1	0	10½
11	Fedor Duz-Khotimirsky (Russian Empire)	0	0	0	½	1	½	0	½	0	1	x	1	1	0	0	0	1	1	1	1	9½
12	Simon Alapin (Russian Empire)	0	0	½	0	½	½	½	1	½	0	0	x	½	1	1	0	1	1	½	½	9
13-14	Hugo Süchting (German Empire)	0	0	½	½	½	½	½	½	1	0	0	½	x	½	½	½	½	½	½	1	8½
13-14	Jacques Mieses (German Empire)	½	0	0	0	0	½	½	½	0	1	1	0	½	x	1	1	½	0	1	½	8½
15	Rudolf Spielmann (Austria)	½	0	0	0	0	0	1	0	0	1	1	0	½	0	x	1	1	0	½	1	7½
16	Ladislav Prokeš (Bohemia)	0	0	0	½	0	0	0	0	½	0	1	1	½	0	0	x	1	½	1	½	6½
17	Curt von Bardeleben (German Empire)	1	0	0	½	½	½	½	0	0	½	0	0	½	½	0	0	x	½	½	½	6
18	Jan Kvíčala (Bohemia)	0	½	0	½	½	0	0	0	0	0	0	0	½	1	1	½	½	x	0	½	5½
19	Abram Rabinovich (Russian Empire)	0	0	0	0	0	½	0	0	½	0	0	½	½	0	½	0	½	1	x	1	5
20	František Treybal (Bohemia)	0	½	0	0	0	0	0	½	0	1	0	½	0	½	0	½	½	½	0	x	4½

== Main Tournament ==
Competitors of the main tournament were selected into four groups, consisting of 8 or 7 players.

The final results:

1. Karel Treybal Bohemia

2-3. István Abonyi Hungary

2-3. Ferenc Chalupetzky Hungary

4. Lev Taussig Bohemia

5. Josef Dobiáš Bohemia

6. Zsigmond Barász Hungary

7. Viktor Dyk Bohemia

8-9. Julius Brach Moravia

8-9. Kamil Krofta Bohemia

10. Bernhard Kagan German Empire

11. Jaroslav Engler Bohemia

12. František Batík Bohemia
