= František Zíta =

Czech chess player

František Zíta (29 November 1909 – 1 October 1977) was a Czech chess master who was born and died in Prague.

Zíta played for Czechoslovakia in Chess Olympiads:

- In 1937, at first reserve board in 7th Chess Olympiad in Stockholm (+4 –4 =3);
- In 1939, at first reserve board in 8th Chess Olympiad in Buenos Aires (+10 –2 =4);
- In 1952, at first reserve board in 10th Chess Olympiad in Helsinki (+1 –0 =2);
- In 1954, at third board in 11th Chess Olympiad in Amsterdam (+1 –1 =8).

He won the individual silver medal at Buenos Aires 1939.

During World War II, he tied for 4th= in Bohemia and Moravia Championship at Rakovnik 1940 (Jan Foltys won), shared 4th at Chocen 1942 (Miroslav Katětov won), tied for 4th= at Prague 1942 (Duras Jubileé, Alexander Alekhine and Klaus Junge won), won at Prague 1943 (B&M-ch), tied for 4th= at Zlín 1943 (Čeněk Kottnauer won).

After the war, he shared 11th at Prague 1946 (Treybal Memorial, Miguel Najdorf won), shared 1st in Czechoslovak Chess Championship at Bratislava 1948 but lost a play-off match for the title to Emil Richter, took 17th at Karlovy Vary 1948 (Foltys won), took 16th at Szczawno Zdrój 1950 (Paul Keres won), took 3rd at Prague 1953 (CSR-ch, Luděk Pachman won), shared 13th at Mariánské Lázně / Prague 1956 (Miroslav Filip won), took 10th at Sofia 1957 (zonal, Filip won). Zita played in the 1957 European Team Championship where the Czech team won the bronze medal.

Zíta was awarded the International Master (IM) title in 1950.
