= František Schubert =

Czech chess player

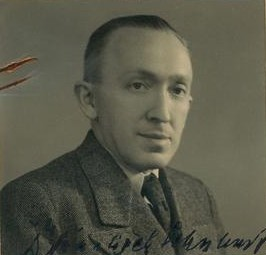

František Schubert (27 April 1894, Mladá Boleslav – 19 April 1942, Łódź) was a Czech chess master.

Before World War I, he took 4th at Pilsen (Plzeň) 1911 (Amos Pokorný and Zářecký won), played at Böhmisch Trübau (Česká Třebová) 1913, and took 7th at Jungbunzlau (Mladá Boleslav) 1913 (Bohemian Championship, Karel Hromádka won).

In 1915, he took 5th in Vienna (the 7th Trebitsch Memorial, Carl Schlechter won). After the war, he won at Prague 1919 (Czechoslovak Chess Championship), took 12th in the Prague City Championship 1921 (won by Hromádka and František Treybal), won at Prague 1925 (the 2nd Kautsky Memorial), shared 6th at Prague 1926 (the 3rd Kautsky Memorial, Jan Schulz, Prokop, and Karel Skalička won), took 9th at Scarborough 1928 (William Winter won), took 14th at Prague 1933 (the 10th Kautsky Memorial, Karel Opočenský won), and tied for 2nd-4th at Prague 1939 (Olympic qual., Jiří Pelikán won). In 1941, he was deported from Prague to Łódź where he was murdered in 1942.

== Notable Game ==
Reti vs. Schubert, 1915
