= Max Walter =

Slovak chess master

Max Walter (1899–1940) was a Slovak chess master.

Born in Pressburg, then Austria–Hungary (present day Bratislava, Slovakia), he began his chess career in Czechoslovakia, after World War I.

Max Walter won Czechoslovak Chess Championship at Pardubice 1923. In other tournaments, he took second, behind Endre Steiner, at Piešťany (Pistyan) 1922, took 14th at Ostrava (Mährisch-Ostrau) 1923 (Emanuel Lasker won), tied for 6-7th at Györ 1924 (Hungarian Championship, Géza Nagy won), tied for 6-7th at Bratislava 1925 (Richard Réti won), and shared second, behind Réti, at Kolin 1925 (Quadrangular).

He won, ahead of Balázs Sárközy, at Budapest 1926, tied for 10-11th at Bardejov 1926 (Hermanis Matisons and Savielly Tartakower won), tied for 7-9th at Trenčianske Teplice 1926 (Boris Kostić and Karl Gilg won), shared 1st, but took 2nd place at České Budějovice 1927 (CSR-ch, Karel Opočenský won), took 4th at Znojmo 1927 (Opočensky won), tied for 7-8th at Trenčianske Teplice 1928 (Kostić won), took 10th at Brno 1928 (Fritz Sämisch and Réti won), tied for 4-5th at Liptovský Svätý Ján 1930, took 3rd at Prague 1931 (CSR-ch, Leo Zobel won), tied for 10-11th at Sliač 1932 (Salo Flohr and Milan Vidmar won), and took 8th at Teplice (Teplitz-Schönau) 1937 (Gilg won).
