= Lev Taussig =

Czech chess player

Lev Taussig (born 1880 – ?) was a Czech chess master.

He took 2nd, behind Oldřich Důras, at Prague 1905 (the 1st UJCS Kongress, Czech Chess Championship), tied for 6-8th at Nuremberg 1906 (the 15th DSB Congress, Kongreß des Deutschen Schachbundes, Hauptturnier A, won by Savielly Tartakower), won at Prague 1906, took 5th at Brno 1907 (the 2nd CZE-ch, František Treybal won), took 2nd behind Duras at Prague 1907, and took 4th in the Prague 1908 chess tournament (the Main Tournament, Karel Treybal won).
