= Munich 1941 chess tournament =

The Second Europaturnier was held from 8 to 14 September 1941 in Munich. The event was organised by Ehrhardt Post, the Chief Executive of Nazi Grossdeutscher Schachbund. The First Europaturnier had taken place in Stuttgart in May 1939.

== Results ==
The event was won by Gösta Stoltz, who scored a spectacular victory with 1½ points ahead of Alexander Alekhine and Erik Lundin. Stoltz won 1,000 Reichsmarks and received a trophy that was donated by Bavarian Ministerpräsident at the time Ludwig Siebert. The trophy was made of Meissen porcelain and worth close to $1,000.

The results and standings:

#	Player	Country	1	2	3	4	5	6	7	8	9	10	11	12	13	14	15	16	Total
1	Gösta Stoltz	Sweden	x	½	1	0	1	1	1	½	1	½	1	1	1	½	1	1	12
2-3	Alexander Alekhine	France	½	x	½	1	0	1	½	1	1	1	½	½	0	1	1	1	10½
2-3	Erik Lundin	Sweden	0	½	x	0	½	1	½	1	½	1	1	1	1	1	½	1	10½
4	Efim Bogoljubow	Germany	1	0	1	x	½	0	½	½	0	1	½	1	½	1	1	1	9½
5-6	Bjørn Nielsen	Denmark	0	1	½	½	x	1	½	½	0	½	0	1	½	1	1	1	9
5-6	Kurt Richter	Germany	0	0	0	1	0	x	½	0	1	1	1	1	1	1	1	½	9
7	Jan Foltys	Germany ( (Protectorate of Bohemia and Moravia) Bohemia and Moravia)	0	½	½	½	½	½	x	1	½	0	½	1	1	0	1	½	8
8	Pál Réthy	Hungary	½	0	0	½	½	1	0	x	0	½	½	½	1	1	½	1	7½
9-10	Braslav Rabar	Independent State of Croatia	0	0	½	1	1	0	½	1	x	½	0	0	½	½	1	½	7
9-10	Georg Kieninger	Germany	½	0	0	0	½	0	1	½	½	x	½	1	½	½	½	1	7
11	Géza Füster	Hungary	0	½	0	½	1	0	½	½	1	½	x	0	1	0	0	1	6½
12	Paul Mross	Germany (General Government)	0	½	0	0	0	0	0	½	1	0	1	x	½	1	½	1	6
13	Karel Opočenský	Germany ( (Protectorate of Bohemia and Moravia) Bohemia and Moravia)	0	1	0	½	½	0	0	0	½	½	0	½	x	½	1	½	5½
14-15	Ivan Vladimir Rohaček	Slovakia	½	0	0	0	0	0	1	0	½	½	1	0	½	x	½	0	4½
14-15	Nicolaas Cortlever	Netherlands	0	0	½	0	0	0	0	½	0	½	1	½	0	½	x	1	4½
16	Peter Leepin	Switzerland	0	0	0	0	0	½	½	0	½	0	0	0	½	1	0	x	3

== Max Euwe's rejection ==
Former world champion Max Euwe declined the invitation due to "occupational obligations" as manager of a groceries business. He would later decline the invitation to a similar event, Salzburg 1942 chess tournament due to illness. It is speculated that the real motive was the invitation of Alexander Alekhine, who had written antisemitic articles. Among others, Alekhine had written about the "Jewish clique" around Euwe in the World Chess Championship 1935.
