= Ivan Vladimir Rohaček =

Slovak chess player (1909–1977)

Ivan Vladimir Rohaček (19 April 1909 – 22 November 1977) was a Slovak chess player.

== Biography ==
Rohaček was born in Kysáč, a Slovak village near Novi Sad, at the time in Austria-Hungary. He won Slovak championships in 1930, 1936, and 1939. Rohaček took 12th at Bad Sliač 1932 (Salo Flohr and Milan Vidmar won). In 1935, he took 8th in Luhačovice (Karel Opočensky won). In 1938, he took 4th in Prague (15th CSR-ch; Opočensky won).

In 1941, he took 6th in Trenčianske Teplice (Jan Foltys won). In September 1941, he tied for 14-15th in Munich (Europaturnier, Gösta Stoltz won). In December 1941, he played for Slovakia in a match against Croatia on first board with Lajos Asztalos (1 : 1) in Zagreb. In 1942, he tied for 9-10th in Munich (Europameisterschaft, 1st European Individual Chess Championship). The event was won by Alexander Alekhine.

In 1946, he took 6th in Ostrava (19th CSR-ch; Luděk Pachman won). In 1946, he tied for 13-14th in Prague (Treybal Memorial). The event was won by Miguel Najdorf. In 1948, he tied for 11-13th in Karlovy Vary (Karlsbad) – Marianske Lazne (Marienbad). The event was won by Foltys. In 1949, he tied for 15-16th in Trenčianske Teplice (Gideon Ståhlberg won).

== Notable chess games ==
- Ivan Vladimir Rohaček vs Josef Rejfiř, Luhačovice 1935, Old Benoni, A43, 1-0
- Jan Foltys vs Ivan Vladimir Rohaček, Munich 1941, Europa Turnier, Tarrasch Defense, Von Hennig Gambit, D32, 0-1
- Ivan Vladimir Rohaček vs Klaus Junge, Munich 1942, 1st European Championship, Semi-Slav Defense, Marshall Gambit, D31, 1-0
- Ivan Vladimir Rohaček vs Enrico Paoli, Trenčianske Teplice 1949, Four Knights Game, Scotch Variation, Accepted, C47, 1-0
