= Treybal =

Treybal is a Czech surname. Notable people with the surname include:

- František Treybal (1882–1947), Czech chess master
- Igor Treybal (born 1930), Czech sports shooter
- Karel Treybal (1885–1941), Czech chess player, brother of František
