= Zabłudowski =

Zabłudowski is a Polish masculine surname, which may be spelled in other countries as Zabludowski, Zabludovski or Zabludovsky; its feminine counterpart is Zabłudowska. The surname may refer to:

- Abraham Zabludovsky (1924–2003), Polish-born Mexican architect
- Aron Zabłudowski (1909–1941), Polish chess player
- Jacobo Zabludovsky, (1928–2015), Mexican journalist, brother of Abraham
