= Géza Füster =

Hungarian-Canadian chess player (1910–1990)

Personal information
- Born: February 19, 1910 Budapest, Hungary
- Died: December 30, 1990 (aged 80) Toronto, Canada

Chess career
- Country: Canada
- Title: International Master (1969)

Géza Füster (February 19, 1910 – December 30, 1990) was a Hungarian-Canadian chess master. A winner of the Hungarian championship, he later represented Canada at Chess Olympiads and at an interzonal tournament for the world chess championship.

== Biography ==
Born in Budapest, Füster won the first of his many Budapest championships in 1936. During World War II, he played in several strong tournaments. In 1941, he won the Hungarian Championship. In 1941, he took 4th, behind Jan Foltys, Jozsef Szily and Ludovit Potuček, at a tournament in Trenčianske Teplice.

In September 1941, he took 11th out of 16 competitors at Munich with 6.5/15, but drew his game with World Champion Alexander Alekhine. The event was won by Gösta Stoltz. In September 1942, he tied for 3rd-5th in Munich (München B, Qualification Tournament). In 1943, he took 2nd, behind Gedeon Barcza, in Diosgyör (Hungarian championship). In 1943, he won in Kolozsvár. In 1943-44, he won the Hungarian correspondence championship.

After the war, he defected. He planned to cross the border at East Berlin with Pal Benko. Füster made it across the border, but Benko was apprehended and sent to prison for nearly three years. Fuster made it to Canada in 1953, settling in Toronto.

Füster's first success in his new land was winning the Toronto City Championship in 1954; he repeated in 1955, 1956, 1962, 1969, and 1971 (shared).

Füster played in many Canadian championships. In 1955, he took 6th in Ottawa (Closed Canadian Chess Championship). In 1955, he was Canadian Speed Champion. In 1957, he won the U.S. Speed Championship. He took 2nd, behind Povilas Vaitonis, in the 1957 Closed Canadian Championship at Vancouver. Füster replaced Vaitonis (who declined to go) at the 1958 Interzonal in Portorož, finishing in last place.

Füster also represented Canada in two Chess Olympiads in 1958 at Munich (8.5/14 on board 4; (+5 =7 -2)), and in 1970 at Siegen (+1 =1 -4) as second reserve.

He was awarded the International Master title in 1969, following his strong 3rd-place finish at the Closed Canadian Chess Championship, held at Pointe-Claire.

Füster was a fixture at the YMCA Chess Club and later the Toronto Chess Club. He was a lover of speed chess, very generous with advice and encouragement to young players, and beloved for his aphorisms. When an opponent played a dubious move he would always say: "When a player is weak I say: 'Will you come again to play tomorrow?'"

He died at Toronto in 1990.
