= Eduard Prandstetter =

Czech chess player (born 1948)

Personal information
- Born: 15 December 1948 (age 77) Prague, Czech Republic

Chess career
- Country: Czechoslovakia; Czech Republic
- Title: International Master (1979)
- Peak rating: 2450 (July 1985)

Eduard Prandstetter (born 15 December 1948), is a Czech chess International Master (IM) (1979), two times Czechoslovak Chess Championship winner (1976, 1978).

== Biography ==
Eduard Prandstetter achieved the greatest success in his chess career in 1976 and in 1978 when he twice won the Czechoslovak Chess Championship. In 1985 in Taxco he participated in the World Chess Championship Interzonal Tournament where ranked in 14th place.

His other successes in international chess tournaments included, among others shared 1st place in Prague (1981, tournament Bohemians, together with Jan Ambrož), 2nd place in Cienfuegos (1983, Capablanca Memorial, after Lev Psakhis), 3rd place in Dortmund (1987, tournament B) and 3rd place in Dortmund (1988).

Eduard Prandstetter played for Czechoslovakia in the European Team Chess Championships:

- In 1977, at seventh board in the 6th European Team Chess Championship in Moscow (+0, =1, -2),
- In 1980, at fifth board in the 7th European Team Chess Championship in Skara (+0, =2, -3).

In 1979, he was awarded the FIDE International Master (IM) title.
