= Čeněk Kottnauer =

Czech-British chess player (1910–1996)

Cenek Kottnauer
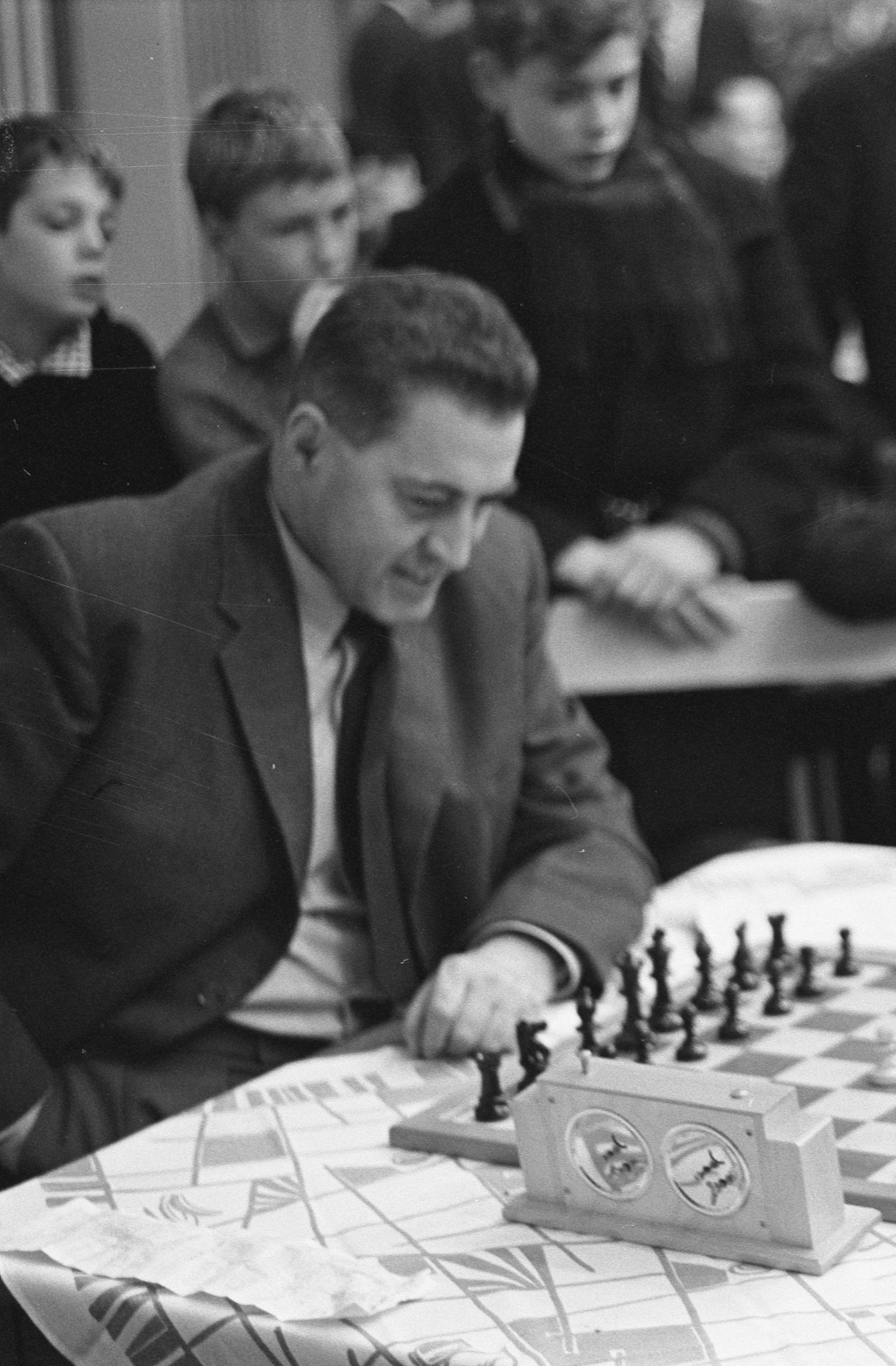
- Cenek Kottnauer, Beverwijk 1962

Personal information
- Born: 24 February 1910 Prague, Austria-Hungary
- Died: 14 February 1996 (aged 85) London, England

Chess career
- Country: Czechoslovakia; United Kingdom
- Title: International Master (1950)

Čeněk Kottnauer (24 February 1910, Prague – 14 February 1996, London) was a Czech British chess master, earning the title of International Master.

At the beginning of his career, he tied for 11-12th at Prague 1933 (Kautsky Memorial, Karel Opočenský won), and took 7th at Prague 1939 (pre-Olympic qual, Jiří Pelikán won).

During World War II, he took 6th at Prague 1942 (Alexander Alekhine and Klaus Junge won), tied for 7-8th at Choceň 1942 (Miroslav Katětov won), and won at Zlin 1943 (ahead of Jan Foltys). In May 1944, he along with other Czech players (Luděk Pachman, Podgorny, Prucha, etc.) lost an 8-game training match against Fedor Bogatyrchuk (+0 –7 =1) in Prague.

After the war, he took 13th at Groningen 1946 (Mikhail Botvinnik won), took 13th at Moscow 1947 (Chigorin Memorial, Botvinnik won), shared 2nd at Vienna 1947 (Schlechter Memorial, László Szabó won), took 3rd at Beverwijk 1947 (Theo van Scheltinga won), took 4th at Bad Gastein 1948 (Erik Lundin won), tied for 8-9th at Beverwijk 1948 (Lodewijk Prins won), took 9th at Venice 1949 (Szabó won), took 10th at Trenčianske Teplice 1949 (Gideon Ståhlberg won), tied for 3rd-6th at Vienna 1949 (Schlechter Memorial, Foltys and Stojan Puc won), tied for 9-10th at Szczawno Zdrój (Salzbrunn) 1950 (Przepiórka Memorial, Paul Keres won), took 17th at Amsterdam 1950 (Miguel Najdorf won), and won at Lucerne 1953.

In 1953, he emigrated to the United Kingdom. He tied for 5-7th at Hastings 1959/60 (Svetozar Gligorić won), and took 11th at Hastings 1968/69 (Vasily Smyslov won).

Kottnauer thrice played in Chess Olympiads. He represented Czechoslovakia on the fourth board at Helsinki 1952 (won an individual gold medal, +10 –0 =5), and England on the first board at Tel Aviv 1964 and on the second board at Lugano 1968.

He was awarded the International Master title in 1950, and the International Arbiter title in 1951.
