= Július Kozma =

Slovak chess player (1929–2009)

Personal information
- Born: 1 June 1929 Bratislava, Czechoslovakia
- Died: 26 November 2009 (aged 80)

Chess career
- Country: Czechoslovakia; Slovakia
- Title: International Master (1957)

Július Kozma (1 June 1929 – 26 November 2009) was a Slovak chess player, International Master (IM) (1957), Czechoslovak Chess Championship winner (1967), European Team Chess Championship team and individual medalist (1957).

== Biography ==
From the second half of the 1950s to the end of 1960s Július Kozma was one of top Czechoslovak chess players. He was repeated participant of Czechoslovak Chess Championship, where in 1967 in Bratislava he won a gold medal. In 1955 and 1956 Július Kozma twice won Czechoslovak Army Chess Championships. He has achieved several successes in international chess tournaments, including won tournament in Bratislava (1957). In 1957, he was awarded the FIDE International Master (IM) title.

Július Kozma played for Czechoslovakia in the Chess Olympiads:

- In 1958, at fourth board in the 13th Chess Olympiad in Munich (+4, =4, -3),
- In 1960, at reserve board in the 14th Chess Olympiad in Leipzig (+4, =2, -3).

Július Kozma played for Czechoslovakia in the European Team Chess Championships:

- In 1957, at fifth board in the 1st European Team Chess Championship in Vienna (+3, =2, -1) and won team bronze and individual silver medals,
- In 1961, at ninth board in the 2nd European Team Chess Championship in Oberhausen (+2, =4, -3),
- In 1970, at sixt board in the 4th European Team Chess Championship in Kapfenberg (+2, =4, -1).

Július Kozma played for Czechoslovakia in the World Student Team Chess Championships:

- In 1954, at third board in the 1st World Student Team Chess Championship in Oslo (+8, =0, -1) and won team and individual gold medals,
- In 1955, at second board in the 2nd World Student Team Chess Championship in Lyon (+5, =1, -6),
- In 1956, at second board in the 3rd World Student Team Chess Championship in Uppsala (+2, =3, -2),
- In 1957, at second board in the 4th World Student Team Chess Championship in Reykjavík (+2, =7, -2) and won team bronze medal,
- In 1958, at second board in the 5th World Student Team Chess Championship in Varna (+3, =5, -1) and won team bronze medal.
