= Theodor Gruber =

Austrian chess player

Personal information
- Born: unknown
- Died: unknown

Chess career
- Country: Austria

Theodor Gruber, was an Austrian chess player.

In 1921, Theodor Gruber took the 2nd place in the Vienna Amateur Chess Championship. In 1922, in Bad Oeynhausen he participated in German Chess Congress and shared 8th - 10th place. In 1923, in Vienna Theodor Gruber participated in first Carl Schlechter Memorial Tournament.

Theodor Gruber played for Austria in the Chess Olympiad:

- In 1927, at reserve board in the 1st Chess Olympiad in London (+2, =7, -3).
