= Jiří Fichtl =

Czech chess player

Personal information
- Born: 16 February 1921
- Died: 12 November 2003 (aged 82)

Chess career
- Country: Czechoslovakia; Czech Republic
- Title: International Master (1959)
- Peak rating: 2390 (January 1975)

Jiří Fichtl (16 February 1921 – 12 November 2003), was a Czech chess International Master (1959), Czechoslovak Chess Championship winner (1960), Chess Olympiad individual medalist (1958), European Team Chess Championship team and individual medalist (1957).

== Biography ==
Jiří Fichtl has participated in international chess tournaments since 1943. In 1910 he was one of the strongest chess players in Czechoslovakia. Jiří Fichtl nineteen times participated in the final of the Czechoslovak Chess Championships and in 1960 became the winner of this tournament. In 1959, he was awarded the FIDE International Master (IM) title.

Jiří Fichtl played for Czechoslovakia in the Chess Olympiads:

- In 1954, at reserve board in the 11th Chess Olympiad in Amsterdam (+2, =4, -1),
- In 1958, at the third board in the 13th Chess Olympiad in Munich (+9, =7, -1) and won the individual silver medal,
- In 1960, at third board in the 14th Chess Olympiad in Leipzig (+6, =9, -1),
- In 1962, at fourth board in the 15th Chess Olympiad in Varna (+3, =7, -4).

Jiří Fichtl played for Czechoslovakia in the European Team Chess Championships:

- In 1957, at the seventh board in the 1st European Team Chess Championship in Vienna (+1, =4, -1) and won team and individual bronze medals,
- In 1961, at sixth board in the 2nd European Team Chess Championship in Oberhausen (+2, =3, -4).
