= Tankosićevo =

Neighborhood of Kisac, Serbia

Coordinates: 45.3597°N 19.7290°E

Tankosićevo (Cyrillic: Танкосићево) is a neighborhood of Kisač, which is part of the city of Novi Sad, Serbia. Tankosićevo used to be a separate settlement, until it was joined with Kisač in the 1970s.

== Geography and features ==
Tankosićevo is located in the northern part of Kisač. It is connected to Novi Sad by Kisač bus line number 42.

== Demographics ==
Historical population
Year	Pop.	±%
1948	277	—
1953	308	+11.2%
1961	348	+13.0%
1971	424	+21.8%

== See also ==
- Kisač
