= Groningen 1946 chess tournament =

International chess tournament

Winner Botvinnik, Groningen 1946 chess tournament (film)

Groningen 1946 was the first major international chess tournament to be held after World War II. Held at Groningen in August and September 1946, it was considered a miracle that the Netherlands could stage such an event just fifteen months after the end of the war.

== Summary ==
The Players at the Groningen 1946 chess tournament

Mikhail Botvinnik won the tournament a half point ahead of former World Champion Max Euwe. It was Botvinnik's first outright victory outside of the Soviet Union and Euwe's last major success.

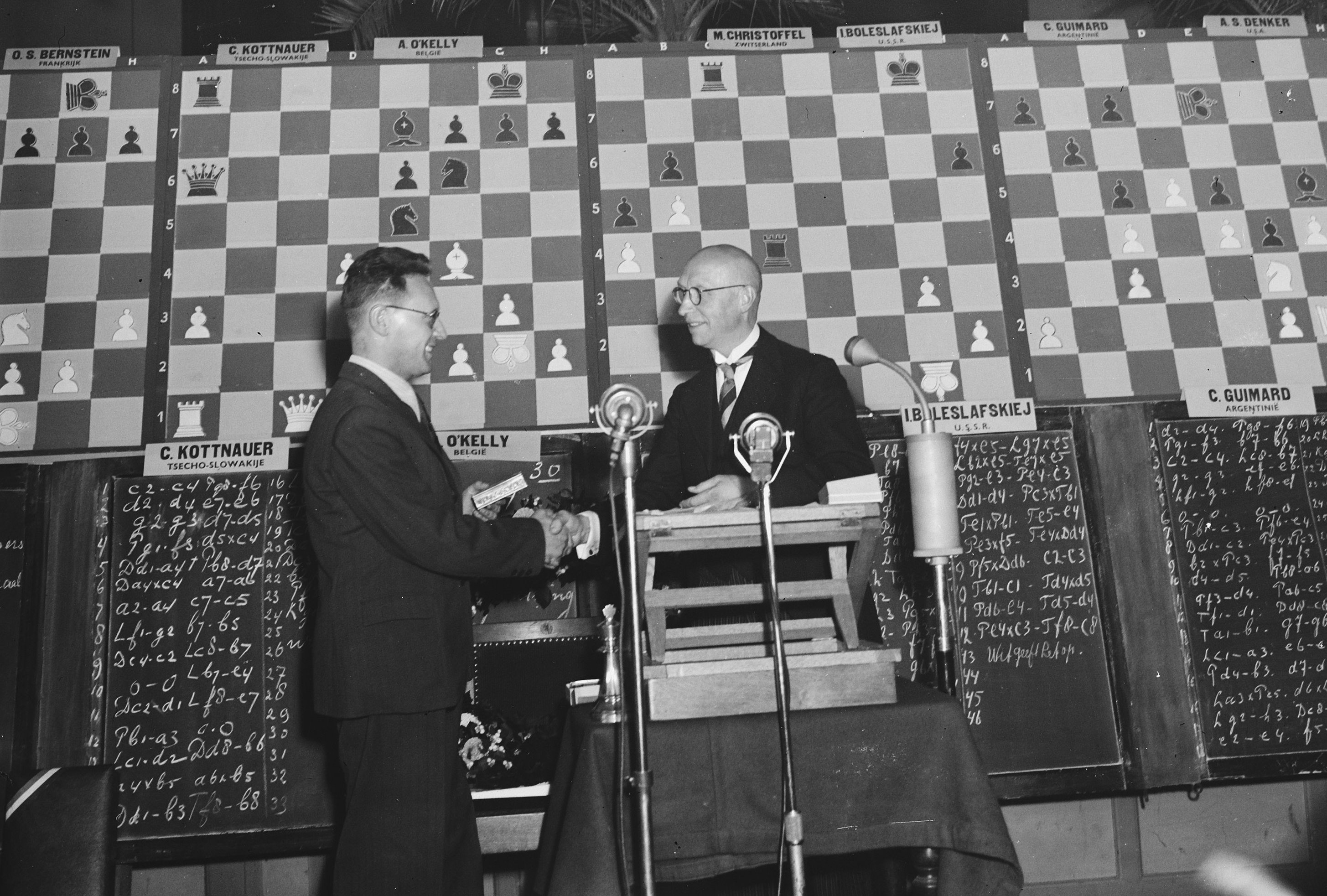
Winner Botvinnik

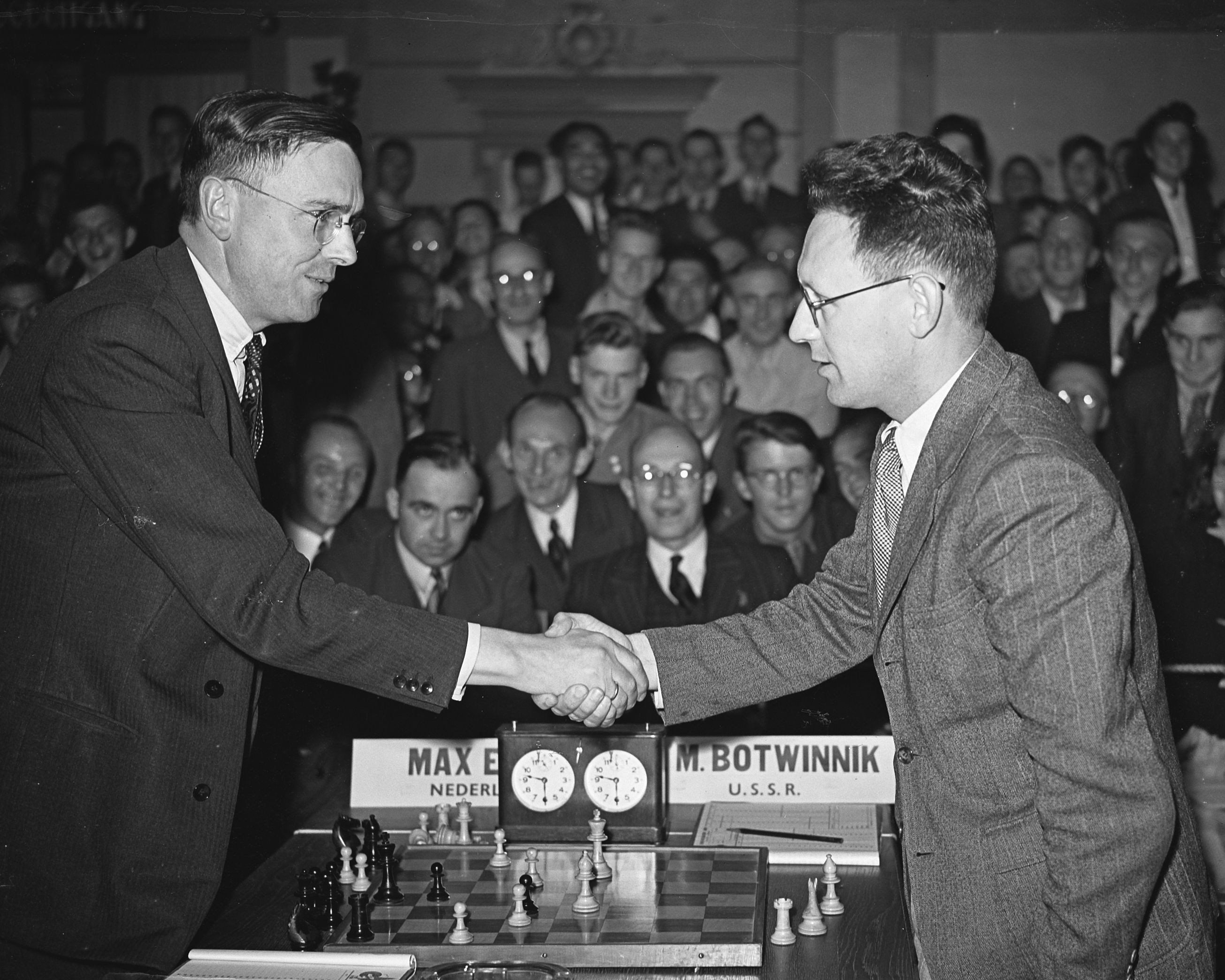
Botvinnik - Euwe: draw

Groningen was the first tournament outside the Soviet Union to which the Soviets sent a team of masters to compete. The Soviet players were very successful, Botvinnik taking first, Vasily Smyslov third, and Isaac Boleslavsky and Salo Flohr tied for sixth and seventh, beginning an era of Soviet domination of international chess.

The tournament was a twenty-player round-robin. Although the field was strong, some top players were not present. From the United States Samuel Reshevsky and Reuben Fine were missing. From the Soviet Union Paul Keres was missing, as Soviet authorities would not let him play outside the country during this period.

Botvinnik and Euwe quickly jumped ahead of the field, making it a two-person contest for first place. At the halfway point (after round 10), Botvinnik had 9 points, Euwe 7½, and Smyslov and Arnold Denker 7. After round 13, Botvinnik had 11½, Euwe 10½, and Smyslov and László Szabó 8½. In round 14, Euwe beat Ossip Bernstein, who at age 65 was the oldest player in the tournament. Botvinnik lost to his countryman Alexander Kotov, creating a first place tie with Euwe. Years later, Kotov reported that he received considerable criticism for beating Botvinnik at a critical point in a major tournament. (Botvinnik was favored at the time by the Soviet chess establishment as a challenger for the world chess championship.) Kotov would make up for his imprudence in the final round. In round 15 Euwe pulled ahead by a game by defeating Milan Vidmar, while Botvinnik lost a second consecutive game, this time to Daniel Yanofsky. With four rounds remaining, the scores stood Euwe 12½, Botvinnik 11½, Smyslov 10½, and Szabó 9½. Euwe's one point lead was not safe as he drew his next three games (Gösta Stoltz, Flohr, and Savielly Tartakower) while Botvinnik won three (Čeněk Kottnauer, Martin Christoffel, and Carlos Guimard) to pull ahead by half a point. In the final round, both Botvinnik and Euwe were playing black and both had strong opponents. The positions of the leaders did not change as both Botvinnik and Euwe lost. Botvinnik was outplayed by Miguel Najdorf, but Euwe blundered to lose in an even position against Kotov to leave Botvinnik with first place.

== Crosstable ==
Groningen 1946
	Player	01	02	03	04	05	06	07	08	09	10	11	12	13	14	15	16	17	18	19	20	Total	Place
01	Mikhail Botvinnik (USSR)	*	½	1	0	1	1	½	1	1	½	0	1	1	0	1	1	1	1	1	1	14½	1
02	Max Euwe (NED)	½	*	0	½	1	1	½	½	½	1	0	½	1	1	1	1	1	1	1	1	14	2
03	Vasily Smyslov (USSR)	0	1	*	½	½	1	½	½	½	½	½	½	1	½	½	½	1	1	1	1	12½	3
04	Miguel Najdorf (ARG)	1	½	½	*	1	1	½	0	½	½	½	½	0	1	½	½	½	1	1	1	11½	4–5
05	László Szabó (HUN)	0	0	½	0	*	1	½	0	1	0	1	½	1	1	½	1	½	1	1	1	11½	4–5
06	Isaac Boleslavsky (USSR)	0	0	0	0	0	*	½	1	1	1	1	1	½	½	½	½	½	1	1	1	11	6–7
07	Salo Flohr (USSR)	½	½	½	½	½	½	*	½	½	½	0	½	½	1	½	1	½	½	1	1	11	6–7
08	Erik Lundin (SWE)	0	½	½	1	1	0	½	*	½	0	½	1	0	1	0	½	½	1	1	1	10½	8–9
09	Gösta Stoltz (SWE)	0	½	½	½	0	0	½	½	*	1	½	½	1	½	1	1	0	½	1	1	10½	8–9
10	Arnold Denker (USA)	½	0	½	½	1	0	½	1	0	*	0	½	0	½	1	½	½	1	1	½	9½	10
11	Alexander Kotov (USSR)	1	1	½	½	0	0	1	½	½	1	*	½	0	½	0	1	½	0	1	0	9½	10
12	Savielly Tartakower (FRA)	0	½	½	½	½	0	½	0	½	½	½	*	1	½	½	1	1	½	½	½	9½	10
13	Čeněk Kottnauer (CSK)	0	0	0	1	0	½	½	1	0	1	1	0	*	1	1	0	½	½	0	1	9	13
14	Daniel Yanofsky (CAN)	1	0	½	0	0	½	0	0	½	½	½	½	0	*	½	1	1	1	½	½	8½	14
15	Ossip Bernstein (FRA)	0	0	½	½	½	½	½	1	0	0	1	½	0	½	*	½	½	½	0	0	7	15-16
16	Carlos Guimard (ARG)	0	0	½	½	0	½	0	½	0	½	0	0	1	0	½	*	1	½	½	1	7	15-16
17	Milan Vidmar (YUG)	0	0	0	½	½	½	½	½	1	½	½	0	½	0	½	0	*	½	½	0	6½	17
18	Herman Steiner (USA)	0	0	0	0	0	0	½	0	½	0	1	½	½	0	½	½	½	*	1	½	6	18
19	Albéric O'Kelly de Galway (BEL)	0	0	0	½	0	0	0	0	0	0	0	½	1	½	1	½	½	0	*	1	5½	19
20	Martin Christoffel (SUI)	0	0	0	0	0	0	0	0	0	½	1	½	0	½	1	0	1	½	0	*	5	20

== Publications ==
- Max Euwe & Hans Kmoch: Groningen 1946. Het Staunton Wereldschaaktoernooi. Groningen, Niemeijer, 1947
