= Leo Zobel =

Slovak chess player

Leo Zobel (28 January 1895 in Nitra – 25 April 1962) was a Slovak chess master.

He won the 7th Czechoslovak Chess Championship at Prague 1931. He also took 12th at Trenčianske Teplice 1928 (Boris Kostić won), tied for 9–10th at Brno 1929 (the 6th CSR-ch, Karel Opočenský won), and tied for 10–11th at Stubňanské Teplice 1930 (Andor Lilienthal won).
