= Carl Schlechter Memorial Tournament =

Chess competition

Carl Schlechter Memorial Tournament (Carl-Schlechter-Gedenkturnier) is an irregularly scheduled chess competition initiated to honor the memory of leading Austrian chess master Carl Schlechter (1874–1918), who died as a result of privations suffered in the immediate aftermath of World War I.

As of 2008, seven Memorial Tournaments have taken place mostly in Schlechter's native city of Vienna (the edition of 1971 was played in Gloggnitz, Austria), with the first and certainly strongest one, held from 15 November to 28 November 1923, organized and attended by twelve of Schlechter's colleagues. The winner was Savielly Tartakower, followed by Richard Réti, Rudolf Spielmann, Ernst Grünfeld, Lajos Steiner, Albert Becker, Karel Opočenský, Sándor Takács, Siegfried Reginald Wolf, Felix Fischer, Julius von Paray and Theodor Gruber.

== Winners ==
#	Year	Winner
1	1923	Savielly Tartakower (Poland)
2	1947	László Szabó (Hungary)
3	1949	Jan Foltys (Czechoslovakia); Stojan Puc (Yugoslavia)
4	1951	Moshe Czerniak (Israel)
5	1961	Yuri Averbakh (Soviet Union)
6	1971	Vlastimil Hort (Czechoslovakia)
7	1996 (Open)	Ilya Balinov (Bulgaria)
