= Ján Podhradský =

Slovak footballer

Personal information
- Full name: Ján Podhradský
- Date of birth: 31 August 1917
- Place of birth: Kisač, Austria-Hungary (now Serbia)
- Date of death: 15 December 1998 (aged 81)
- Place of death: Bratislava, Slovakia
- Position: Midfielder

Senior career*
Years	Team	Apps	(Gls)
1933–1935	SŠK Bački Petrovac		
1935–1936	Vojvodina		
1937–1939	BSK Belgrade	28	(16)
1939–1941	SK Štefanik		
1941–1947	ŠK Bratislava	153	(124)

International career
1938	Yugoslavia	1	(0)
1942–1944	Slovakia	4	(1)
- * Club domestic league appearances and goals

Ján Podhradský (31 August 1917 – 15 December 1998) was a footballer who represented both Yugoslavia and Slovakia internationally.

== Club career ==
He was born during World War I in the town of Kisač, on the outskirts of Novi Sad, at the time still part of the Austro-Hungarian Empire but after the war became part of Serbia and subsequently Yugoslavia. He started playing in a local club named SŠK Bački Petrovac which was a club gathering the local Slovak community. It was while playing there that he got spotted by one of the major regional clubs, FK Vojvodina, which brought him to their ranks in 1935. His technical abilities were highlighted by the local press, and soon he became the target of BSK Belgrade, the Serbian club which was dominating the Yugoslav championship in the 1930s. One year after joining Vojvodina, Podhradský was again on the move, this time to the capital Belgrade. He became the regular left midfielder of BSK during the three seasons he played with BSK. He made 28 appearances scoring 16 goals in the two editions of the Yugoslav championship he played with BSK, the last one crowned with the national trophy.

In 1939 BSK was bringing numerous new players, and Podhradský left and joined SK Štefanik, a club from Stara Pazova, where he played until 1941 when Second World War started in Yugoslavia with the Axis invasion of the country. That is when Podhradský leaves Yugoslavia and moves to the country his parents came from Slovakia, which was now Nazi-German supported independent state after the dismemberment of Czechoslovakia. Podhradský settles in the capital Bratislava and is immediately incorporated into the Slovak most dominant club, ŠK Bratislava. Since his arrival in 1941 till his retirement in 1947 Podhradský made 124 goals in 153 official matches for ŠK Bratislava, and has won two national titles, in 1942 and 1944. He then retired and lived in Bratislava until his death in 1998.

His name in Slovak is Ján Podhradský, although during the period he played in Yugoslavia his name was often spelled in a simplified version as Jan Podhradski (Cyrillic: Јан Подхрадски).

== International career ==
Podhradský is among the players that played for two different national teams. He represented Yugoslavia in a friendly match against Romania in 1938, and, after moving to Slovakia, he played four times for Slovakia in friendlies, in the period Slovak national team was active during the war.

== Honours ==
BSK Belgrade

- Yugoslav First League: 1938-39

ŠK Bratislava

- Slovak League: 1942, 1944
