= Daniel Piksiades =

Yugoslav and Serbian poet (1931–2024)

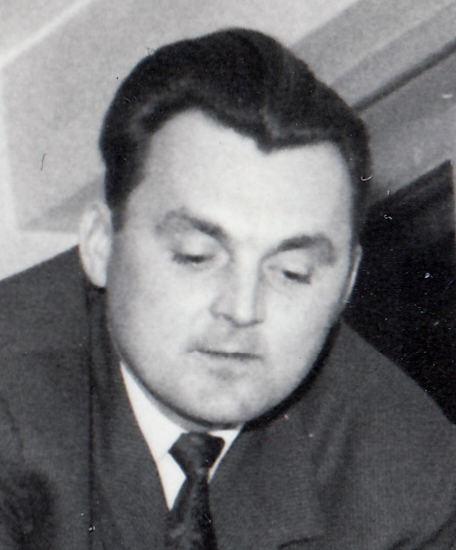
- Piksiades in 1960
- Born: 5 July 1931; Kisač, Danube Banovina, Kingdom of Yugoslavia
- Died: 30 March 2024 (aged 92); Thunder Bay, Ontario, Canada
- Resting place: Saint Andrew's Catholic Cemetery, Thunder Bay
- Occupation: Writer
- Spouse(s): Smiljana Piksiades, literary translator
- Writing career
- Language: Serbo-Croatian
- Notable works: Interlude-Pauza, Road sign toward the stars, Celebration of water, Road sign toward the star, Celebration of water

Daniel Piksiades (Slovak: Daniel Pixiades; 5 July 1931 – 30 March 2024) was a Yugoslav and Serbian poet of Slovak origin. He was the author of poetry collections in Slovak, Serbian and Croatian, and has been translated into many world languages. He was a member of the Association of Writers of Serbia, Slovakia, Vojvodina and Montenegro.

== Biography ==
Daniel Piksiades was born on 5 July 1931, in the town of Kisač in Vojvodina. He graduated from the teachers' school in Sombor in 1950. He worked as a teacher in Seleuš, Veliko Središte, Kulpin, Sremski Karlovci, Stari Bar and Sutomore. He worked for a year in the Catering Chamber in Novi Sad. At the end of September 1974, he moved to Canada with his family. Piksiades resided in Thunder Bay, Ontario, until his death on 30 March 2024, aged 92.

== Literary work ==
Piksiades collaborated with the Czechoslovak newspaper Ljudove zvesci and volunteered on the local Yugoslav radio station.

In Canada, he was initially a contributor and then editor of the newspaper Naše novine (1977–1988), around which many poets from Canada and around the world gathered. There, Piksiades published poems, stories, essays and articles.

He was a member of the Association Desanka Maksimović.

As he lived in the former Yugoslavia, Piksiades wrote songs in his native Slovak and Serbo-Croatian languages. They have been published in magazines, poem collections and anthologies.

He was a member of the Writers' Association of Slovakia, Serbia, Vojvodina and Montenegro.

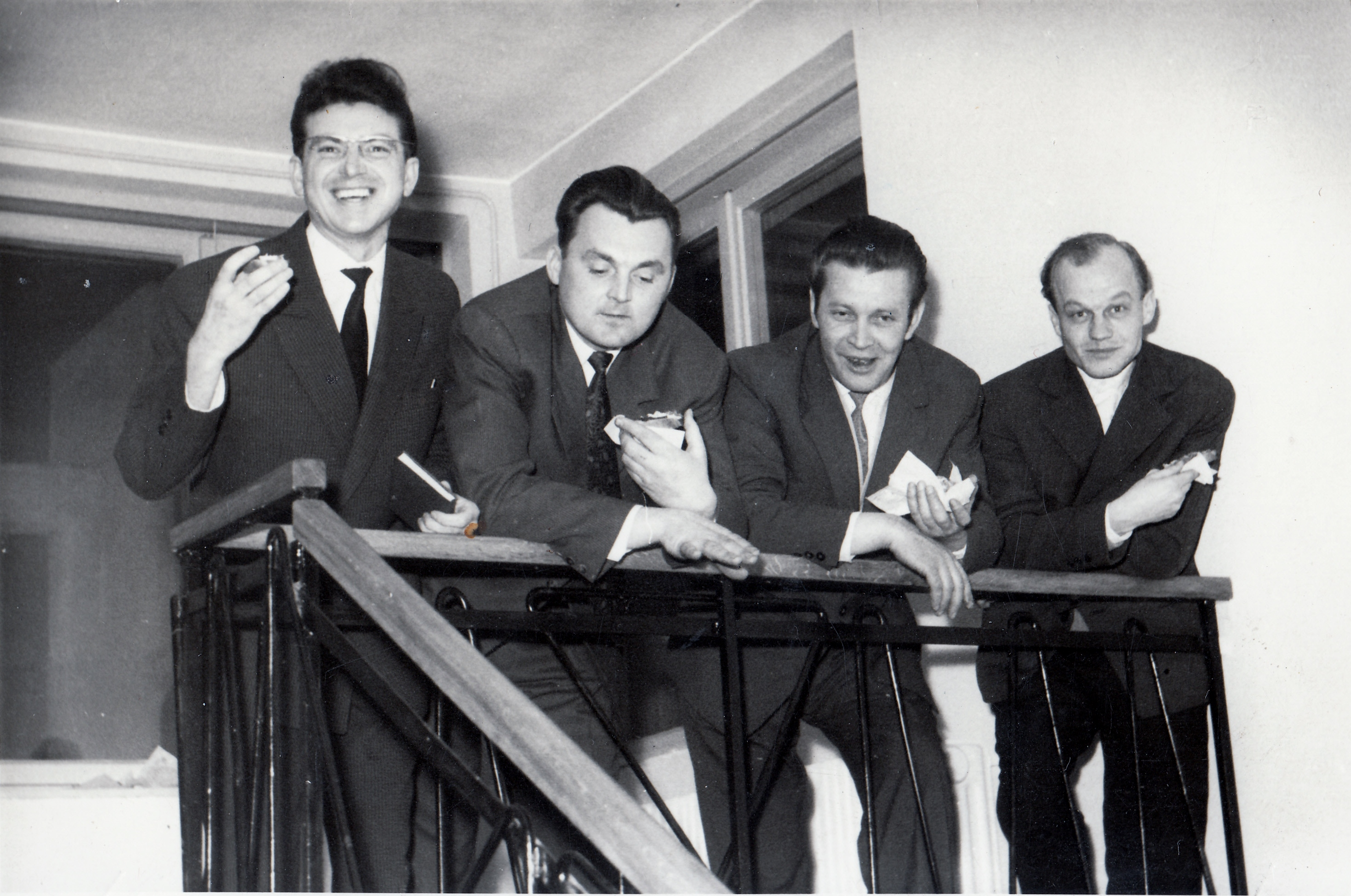
Pavel Mučaji, Daniel Piksiades, Michal Babinka and Juraj Tušiak

== Published works ==
Piksiades combined poetry published in Serbian in Yugoslavia with poetry published in Canada in the collection of poems Being Outside/Biti Izvan (1976). The book was published by the publishing house Kultura in Bački Petrovac. The same publisher has published two more collections of songs by Piksiades in Serbian: To the Heart of the Earth/Ka srcu zemlje (2005) and North from Everywhere/Odasvud sjever (2006).

In 2021, the book Water Festival appeared in St. Petersburg, translated into Russian by the writer and translator Vladimir Baboshin (Russian: Владимир А. Бабошин). In 2021, the book In the Honor of the Grass translated into Belarusian by Diana Lazarevich (Serbian Cyrillic: Дајана Лазаревић) was published in Belarus.

=== Collections of poetry in Slovak ===
- Vlny kotvy vlny – Talasi sidra talasi "Obzor", Novi Sad, 1974.
- Úlet za srdcom – Uzlet za srcem, SVC, Bačsky Petrovec, 2011.
- Zbrazdene nebo – Poorano nebo, SVC, Bačsky Petrovec, 2014.
- Toky – Tokovi, SVC, 2016.
- Klaniam sa trsu – Klanjam se mladicama, SVC, 2017.
- Kaleidoskop, SVC, 2017.
- Zápisky Bez poradia – Zapisi bez redosleda (першая кніга ўспамінаў), Artprint, Novi Sad, 2018.

=== Collections of poetry for children in Slovak ===
- Morska Riša – Morsko carstvo, SVC, 2009.
- Slávnosť – Svečanost, SVC, 2017.
- Slneční pútnici – Sunčani putnici, SVC, 2017.
- Rybka Žiara – Ribica Žiška, SVC, 2015.

=== Biographies in Serbian ===
- Zapisi bez redosleda (druga knjiga memoara), Prometej, Novi Sad, 2015.
- Sunčani putnici, SVC, 2018.

=== Collections of poetry in Serbian ===
- Svečanost vode, Beograd, Alma, 2017.
- Putokaz ka zvijezdi, Beograd, Alma, 2017.
- Putnici na jug, Beograd, Alma, 2017.
- Prvijenci i ostaci, Beograd, Alma, 2017.

=== Collections of poetry in English ===
- Interlude-Pauza, Emerson Street Printing, Thunder Bay, 2011.
- Road sign toward the stars – Putokaz ka zvijezdi, LULU Press, 2017.
- Celebration of water – Proslava voda, LULU Press, 2017.
- Road sign toward the star – Putokaz ka zvijezdi, AMAZON, 2019.
- Celebration of water – Proslava voda, AMAZON, 2019.

== Literature ==
- Celebration of water – Proslava voda, LULU Press, 2017.
- Road sign toward the star – Putokaz ka zvijezdi, AMAZON, 2019.
- Ka srcu zemlje / Danijel Piksijades. – Bački Petrovac : Kultura, 2005 (Bački Petrovac : Kultura).
- Prvijenci i ostaci / Danijel Piksijades. – Beograd : Алма, 2017 (Mladenovac : Presing).
- Interlude / Daniel Piksiades; [translator Smiljana Piksiades]. – [Ontario] : D. Piksiades, 2011.
- Svečanost vode / Danijel Piksijades. – Beograd : Алма, 2017 (Mladenovac : Presing).
- Toky / Daniel Pixiades; [zo srbčiny preložila Katarína Pucovská]. – Báčsky Petrovec : Slovenské vydavateĺské centrum, 2016 (Kysáč : Grafoffice).
- Putnici na jug / Danijel Piksijades. – Beograd : Алма, 2017 (Mladenovac : Presing).
- Putokaz ka zvijezdi / Danijel Piksijades. – Beograd : Алма, 2017 (Mladenovac : Presing).
