= Kisač =

Kisač Кисач (Serbian) Kysáč (Slovak)
- Suburban settlement
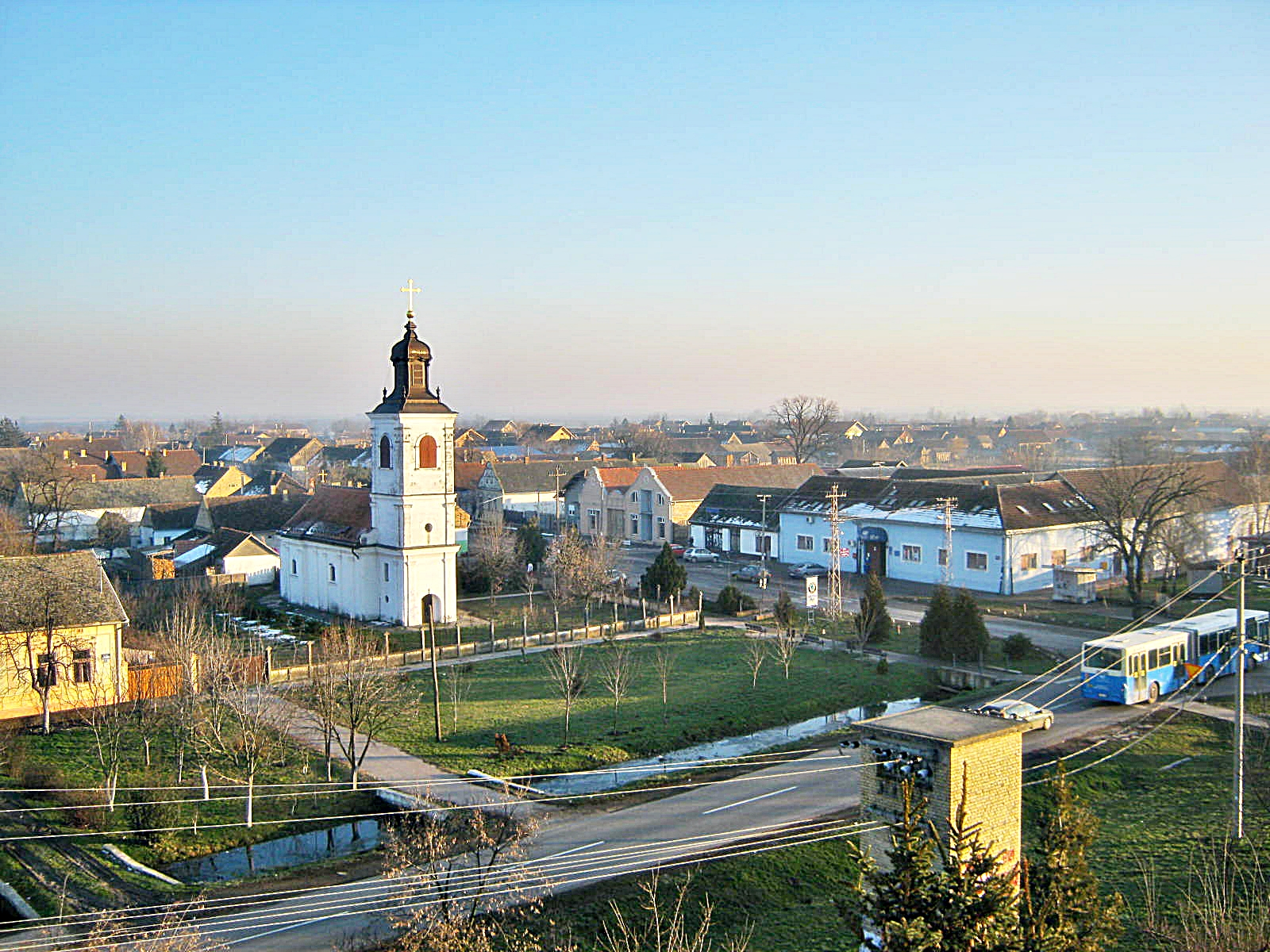
- View from the Evangelical Church Tower in Kisač

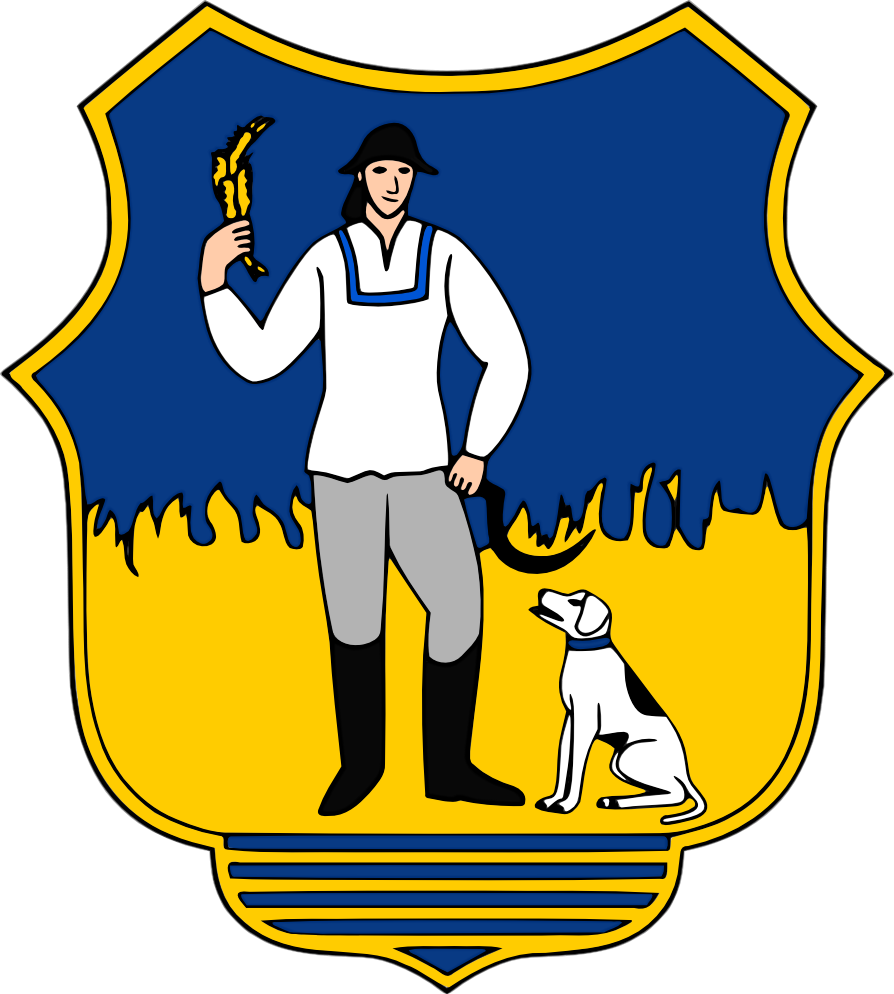
- Seal
- Interactive map of Kisač
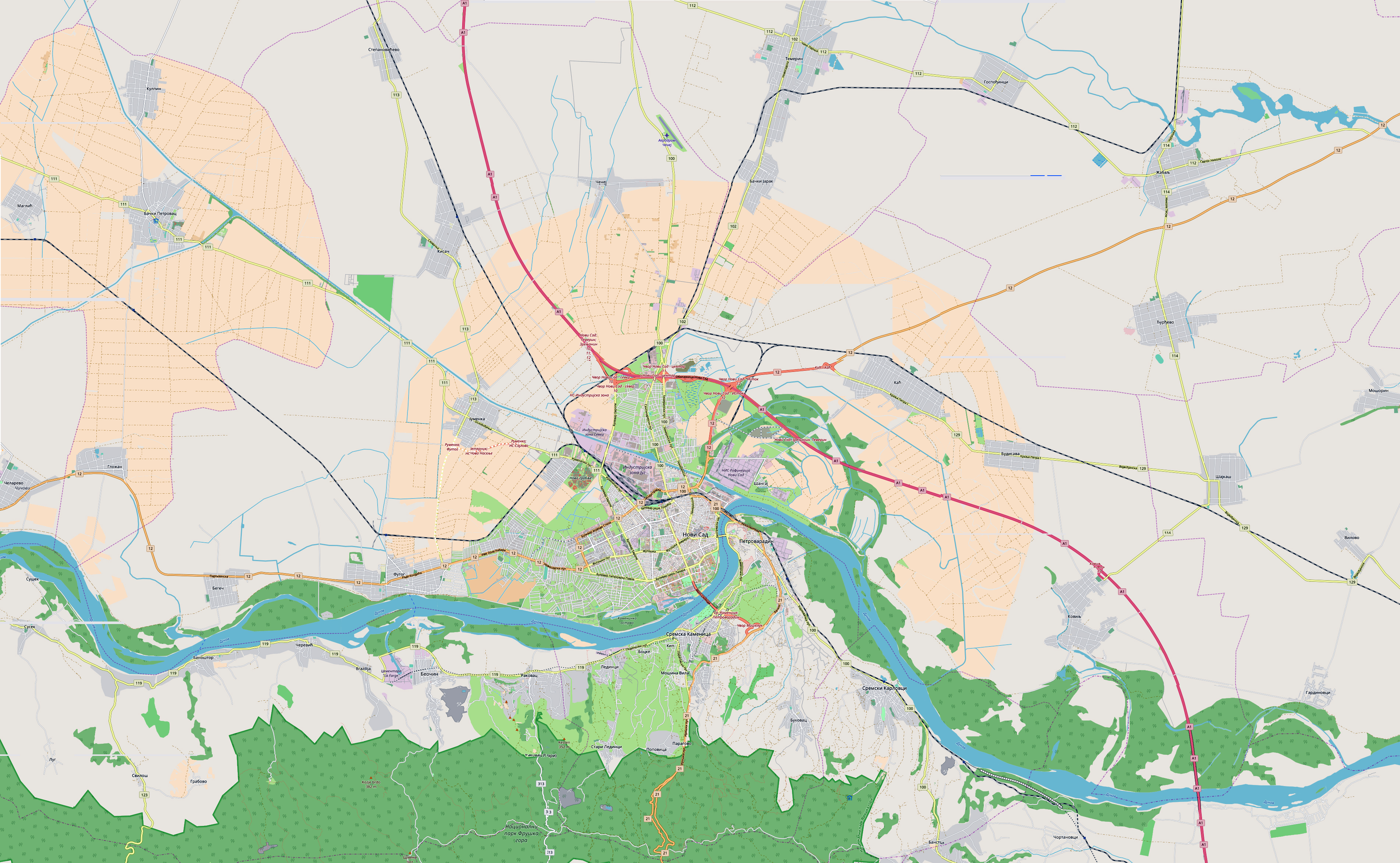
- Location within Novi Sad Kisač (Vojvodina) Kisač (Serbia)
- Coordinates: 45.3597°N 19.7290°E
- Country: Serbia
- Province: Vojvodina
- District: South Bačka
- Municipality: Novi Sad

Government
  - Mayor: Ján Marčok (Independent)

Area
  - Total: 29.67 km^{2} (11.46 sq mi)

Population (2022)
  - Total: 4,511
  - Density: 152.0/km^{2} (393.8/sq mi)
- Time zone: UTC+1 (CET)
  - Summer (DST): UTC+2 (CEST)
- Postal code: 21211
- Area code: +381(0)21
- Car plates: NS
- Website: www.mzkisac.rs

Kisač (Serbian Cyrillic: Кисач; Slovak: Kysáč) is a suburban settlement of the city of Novi Sad, Serbia.

== Name ==
In Serbian and Croatian, the village is known as Kisač (Кисач); in Slovak as Kysáč; in Czech as Kysáč; and in Hungarian as Kiszács.

== History ==
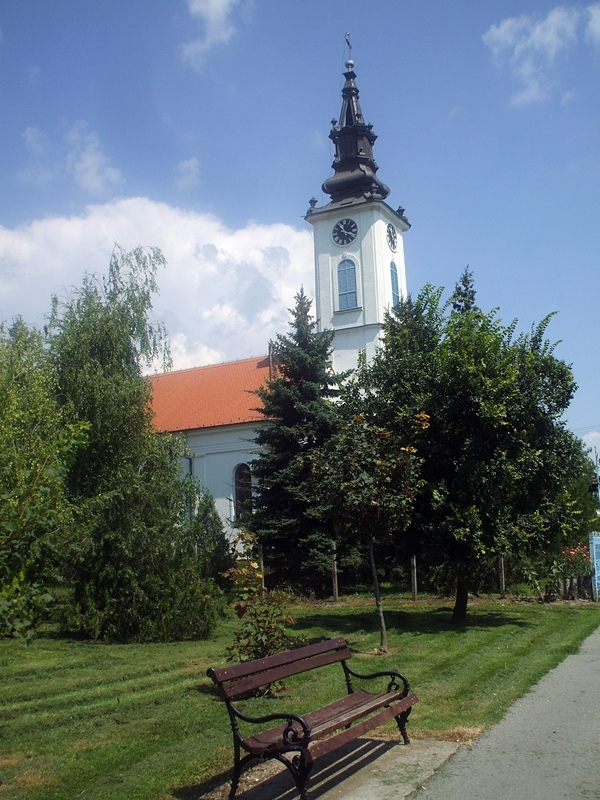
Slovak Evangelical Church

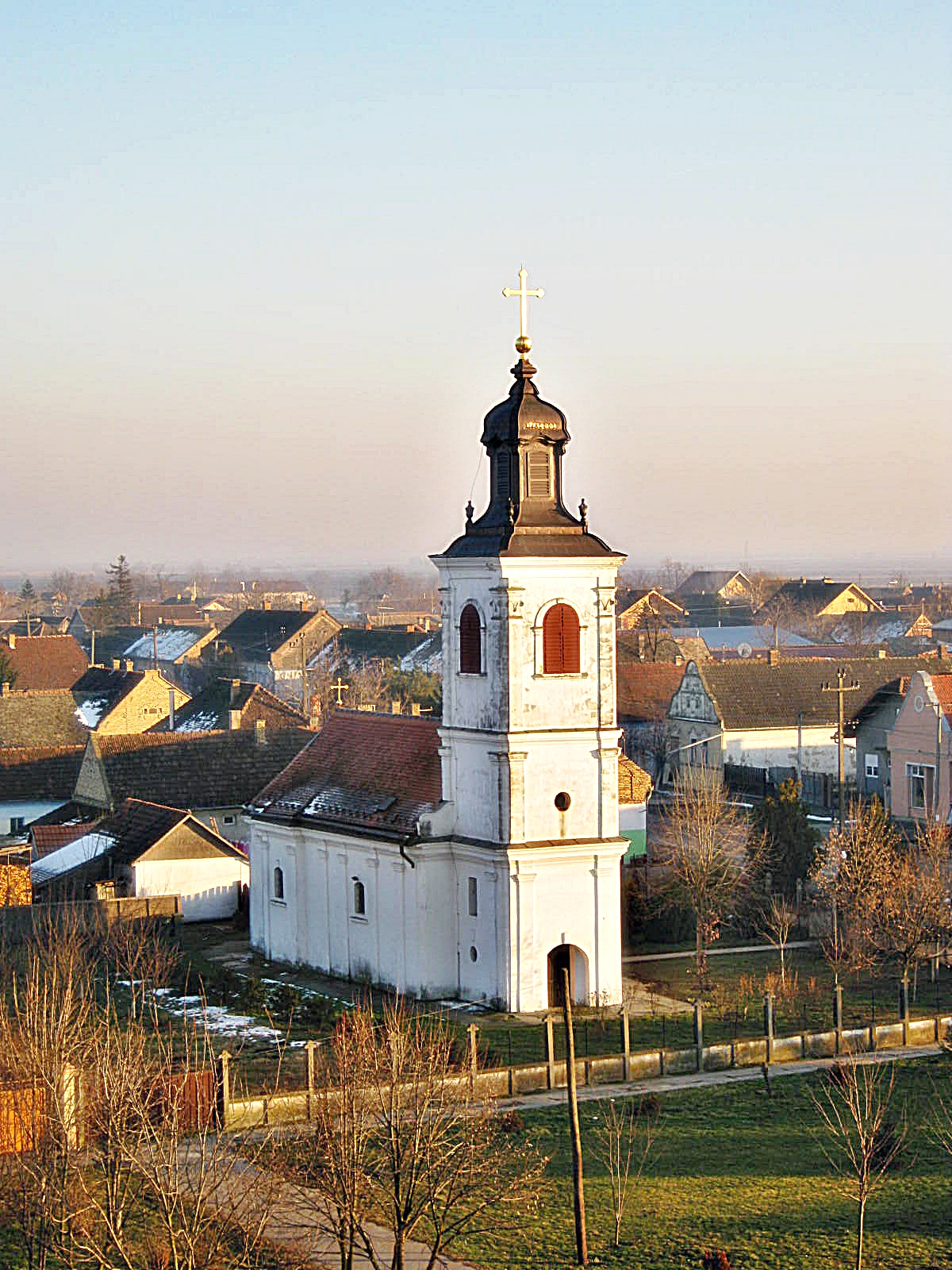
Serbian Orthodox Church

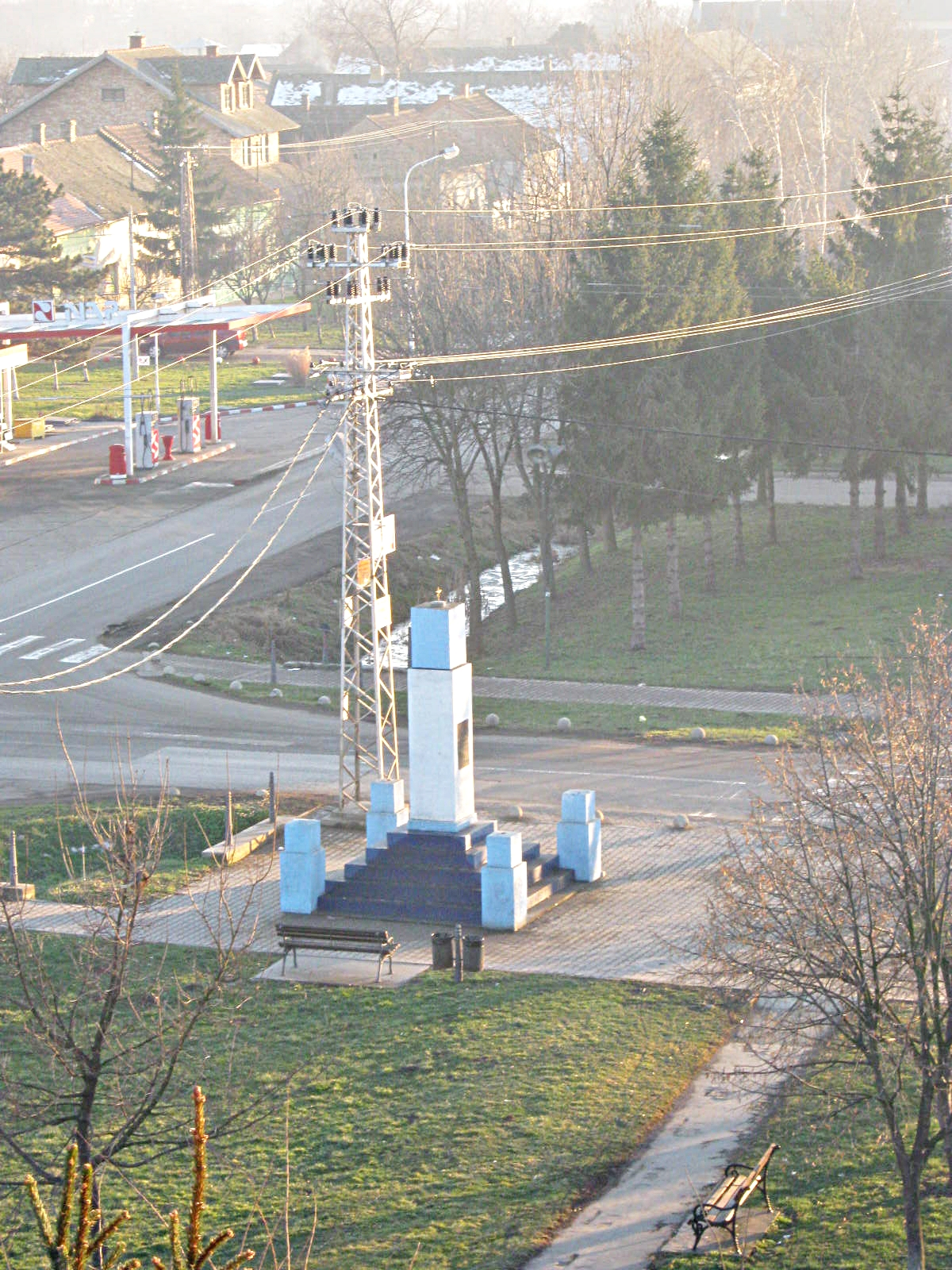
Monument in Kisač

The village was first mentioned in 1457. It was then under the administration of the medieval Kingdom of Hungary and was part of the Bács (Bač) county. In the 16th-17th centuries, it was under the administration of the Ottoman Empire and was part of the Sanjak of Segedin, firstly within the Budin Eyalet and later within the Egir Eyalet. During this time it was populated by ethnic Serbs.

At the end of the 17th century, the region of Bačka was captured by the Habsburg monarchy and in the beginning of the 18th century Kisač had 110 Serb households. The Serbs, however, emigrated to Syrmia and the village became abandoned. It was later rebuilt and populated by the Slovak settlers from the Pest County and Central Slovakia. First settlers arrived in 1773, while most of them arrived between 1776 and 1786. In 1798, Kisač had 337 Slovak families.

Until the middle of the 19th century, the village was part of the Batsch-Bodrog County within the Habsburg Kingdom of Hungary. In 1848-1849 it was part of the autonomous Serbian Vojvodina and from 1849 to 1860 it was part of the Voivodeship of Serbia and Banat of Temeschwar, a separate Habsburg crownland. After abolishment of the voivodeship in 1860, the village was again included into Batsch-Bodrog County. According to 1910 census, most of the inhabitants of the village spoke Slovak.

Since 1918, the village was part of the Kingdom of Serbs, Croats and Slovenes (later renamed to Yugoslavia). In 1918-1919, it was part of the Banat, Bačka and Baranja region, and also (from 1918 to 1922) part of the Novi Sad County. From 1922 to 1929, it was part of the Bačka Oblast, and from 1929 to 1941 part of the Danube Banovina. After World War I, a new settlement named Tankosićevo was built near Kisač. This new settlement was populated by 24 Serb colonist families.

From 1941 to 1944, Kisač and Tankosićevo were under Axis occupation and were attached to the Horthy's Hungary. In 1944, the Soviet Red Army and Yugoslav partisans expelled Axis troops from the region and two villages were included into autonomous province of Vojvodina within new socialist Yugoslavia. Since 1945, Vojvodina is part of the People's Republic of Serbia within Yugoslavia. After the war, Slovak ethnic majority was recorded in both settlements. During the 1970s, the two villages, Kisač and Tankosićevo, were joined into a single settlement named Kisač.

== Historical population ==
- 1948: 5,664
- 1953: 5,671
- 1961: 5,907
- 1971: 6,022
- 1981: 6,220
- 1991: 5,850
- 2002: 5,471
- 2011: 5,091
- 2022: 4,511

=== Ethnic groups ===
According to data from the 2022 census, ethnic groups in the village include:

- 3,137 (69.5%) Slovaks
- 911 (20.2%) Serbs
- Others/Undeclared/Unknown

== Culture ==
There is a Slovak Evangelist Church (from 1795) and a Serbian Orthodox Church (from 1773) in the settlement. The Kisač Culture and Information Centre (KYS), founded in 1964, promotes cultural activities, mainly folklore and amateur theatre. Radio Kisač, a part of KYS, was the first local radio station to be founded in Vojvodina.

== Geography ==
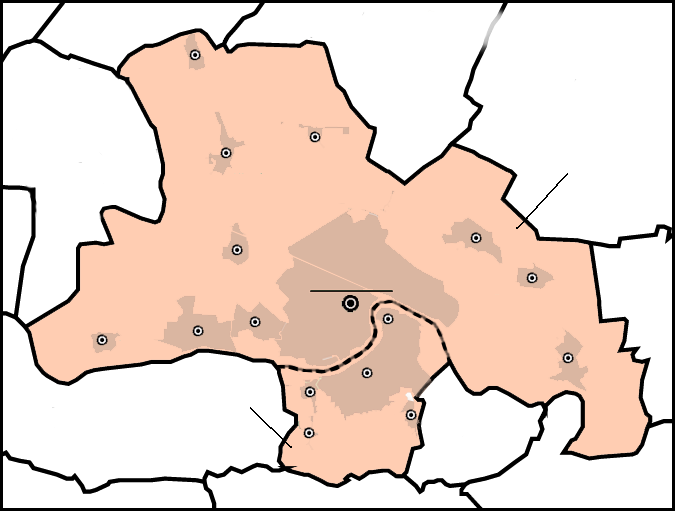

== Traffic ==
It is connected to Novi Sad by bus lines 42 and 43.

== Notable people ==
- Milan Stepanov, footballer
- Ján Podhradský, footballer
- Jozef Roháček, Bible translator
- Ivan Vladimir Rohaček, chess player
- Daniel Pixiades, writer

== Sister cities ==
Kisač has friendship with:

- Kysak, Slovakia
- Belá-Dulice, Slovakia
- Hontianske Nemce, Slovakia

== See also ==
- Tankosićevo
- Novi Sad
- List of places in Serbia
- List of cities, towns and villages in Vojvodina
