= Czechoslovak Chess Championship =

Czechoslovak chess competition

The Czechoslovak National Chess Championship was a chess competition to determine the best Czechoslovak chess player.

== History ==
The first Czechoslovak championships were held in Prague in 1919. After a break caused by World War II, the championships were held until 1992.

Twelve tournaments were organized within international open tournaments;the best Czech or Czechoslovak player then won the title - such tournaments are marked with an asterisk in the following list and the overall ranking of the eventual champion in the tournament is added in brackets.

== List of winners ==
Year	City	Winner
1919	Prague	František Schubert
1921	Brno	Karel Hromádka, Ladislav Prokeš, Karel Treybal
1923	Pardubice	Max Walter
1925	Bratislava	Richard Réti
1927	České Budějovice	Karel Opočenský
1929	Brno	Karel Opočenský
1931	Prague	Leo Zobel
1933	Mnichovo Hradiště	Salo Flohr
1936	Poděbrady*)	Salo Flohr (1st)
1938	Prague	Karel Opočenský
1946	Ostrava	Luděk Pachman
1948	Bratislava	Emil Richter
1950	Gottwaldov (now Zlín)	Miroslav Filip
1952	Tatranská Lomnica	Miroslav Filip
1953	Prague	Luděk Pachman
1954	Prague	Miroslav Filip
1955	Prague	Ján Šefc
1956	Poděbrady	Ladislav Alster
1957	Prague	Luděk Pachman
1959	Bratislava	Luděk Pachman
1960	Ostrava	Jiří Fichtl
1961	Košice	Luděk Pachman
1962	Jablonec nad Nisou	Lubomír Kaválek
1963	Prague	Luděk Pachman
1964	Brno	Vlastimil Jansa
1965	Pardubice	Josef Augustin
1966	Harrachov*)	Luděk Pachman (3rd)
1967	Bratislava	Július Kozma
1968	Luhačovice	Lubomír Kaválek
1969	Luhačovice*)	Vlastimil Hort (3rd)
1970	Havířov	Vlastimil Hort
1971	Luhačovice*)	Vlastimil Hort (1st)
1972	Třinec	Vlastimil Hort
1973	Luhačovice*)	Jan Smejkal (1st)
1974	Rimavská Sobota	Vlastimil Jansa
1975	Brno*)	Vlastimil Hort (1st)
1976	Ostrava	Eduard Prandstetter
1977	Děčín*)	Vlastimil Hort (3rd)
1978	Mariánské Lázně	Eduard Prandstetter
1979	Trenčianske Teplice	Jan Smejkal
1980	Trnava	Jan Ambrož
1981	Hradec Králové*)	Ľubomír Ftáčnik (2nd)
1982	Frenštát pod Radhoštěm	Ľubomír Ftáčnik
1983	Bratislava*)	Ľubomír Ftáčnik (2nd)
1984	Šumperk	Vlastimil Jansa
1985	Trenčianske Teplice*)	Ľubomír Ftáčnik (2nd)
1986	Prague	Jan Smejkal
1987	Námestovo*)	Eduard Meduna (2nd)
1988	Třinec	Pavel Blatný
1989	Prague*)	Ľubomír Ftáčnik (2nd)
1990	Brno	Pavel Blatný
1991	Bratislava	Igor Gažík
1992	Prague	Vítězslav Rašík

During World War II only the Championships of Bohemia and Moravia were held.

== Multiple winners ==
- 7 titles: Luděk Pachman (1946–1966)
- 6 titles: Vlastimil Hort (1969–1977)
- 5 titles: Ľubomír Ftáčnik (1981–1989)
- 3 titles: Miroslav Filip (1950–1954), Vlastimil Jansa (1964–1984), Karel Opočenský (1927–1938), Jan Smejkal (1973–1986)

== Bibliography ==
- MODR, Břetislav - VESELÝ, Jiří: 100 let organizovaného šachu v českých zemích. Příbram, 2005. 223 p. ISBN 80-86595-14-5

== See also ==
- Slovak Chess Championship
- Czech Chess Championship
