= Josef Augustin =

Czech chess player

Personal information
- Born: 18 May 1942 (age 84) Kyjov, Czech Republic

Chess career
- Country: Czechoslovakia; Czech Republic
- Title: International Master (1976)
- Peak rating: 2445 (January 1977)

Josef Augustin (born 18 May 1942) is a Czech chess International Master (1976), Czechoslovak Chess Championship winner (1965).

== Biography ==
In the 1960s and 1970s Josef Augustin was one of the leading Czechoslovak chess players. He repeatedly competed in the Czechoslovak Chess Championship finals, where winning three medals: gold (Pardubice, 1965), silver (Ostrava, 1976) and bronze (Brno, 1975). In 1976, he was awarded the FIDE International Master (IM) title.

Josef Augustin played for Czechoslovakia in the Chess Olympiad:

- In 1968, at first reserve board in the 18th Chess Olympiad in Lugano (+1, =2, -2).

Josef Augustin played for Czechoslovakia in the European Team Chess Championship:

- In 1977, at fourth board in the 6th European Team Chess Championship in Moscow (+0, =5, -2).

Josef Augustin played for Czechoslovakia in the World Student Team Chess Championships:

- In 1960, at second board in the 7th World Student Team Chess Championship in Leningrad (+4, =3, -0) and won team and individual gold medals,
- In 1961, at first reserve board in the 8th World Student Team Chess Championship in Helsinki (+3, =4, -1),
- In 1963, at first reserve board in the 10th World Student Team Chess Championship in Budva (+1, =2, -3).
