= Jan Kvíčala =

Czech chess player

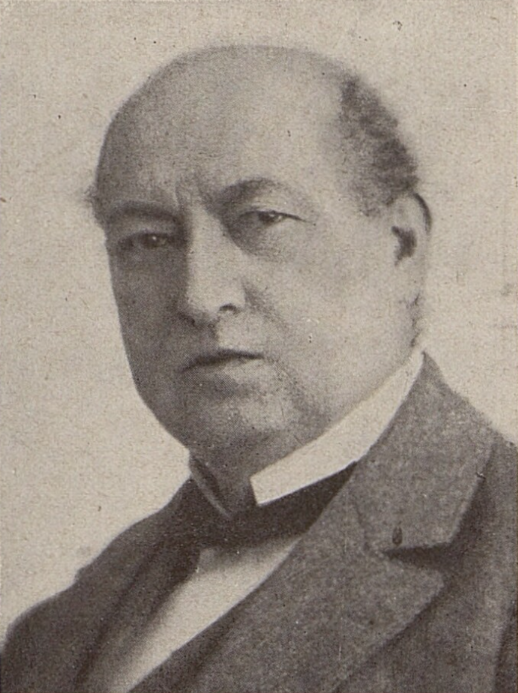
Image of Jan Kvíčala (šachista)

Jan Kvíčala (1868 – 11 February 1939) was a Czech chess master.

He lived and played chess tournaments and matches in Prague. He won in 1891 (the 3rd Congress of the Bohemian Chess Association), lost a match to Oldřich Duras (4 : 5) in 1902, took 2nd behind Duras in 1906, took 18th in the Prague 1908 chess tournament (Duras and Carl Schlechter won), beat Karel Hromádka (3 : 1) in 1909, and took 2nd, behind Duras, in 1910.

Jan Kvíčala won against Wilhelm Cohn (1.5 : 0.5) in a friendly match Berlin vs. Prague in 1913.
