= Jan Ambrož =

Czech chess player

Personal information
- Born: 18 June 1954 (age 72) Lanškroun, Czechoslovakia

Chess career
- Country: Czechoslovakia; Czech Republic
- Title: International Master (1980)
- Peak rating: 2490 (January 1981)

Jan Ambrož (born 18 June 1954), is a Czech chess International Master (IM) (1980), Czechoslovak Chess Championship winner (1980), Chess Olympiad team silver medalist (1982).

== Biography ==
Jan Ambrož achieved the greatest success in his chess career in 1980 when he won the Czechoslovak Chess Championship. In 1982, he participated in the World Chess Championship Zonal Tournament, where he was ranked 8th among 22 players. From 1990 to 1992, Jan Ambrož won three consecutive wins in International Chess Tournament in Bad Ragaz. In 1980, he was awarded the FIDE International Master (IM) title.

Jan Ambrož played for Czechoslovakia in the Chess Olympiads:

- In 1982, at second reserve board in the 25th Chess Olympiad in Lucerne (+0, =1, -0) and won team silver medal.

Jan Ambrož played for Czechoslovakia in the World Student Team Chess Championships:

- In 1974, at second reserve board in the 20th World Student Team Chess Championship in Teesside (+3, =1, -1).
