= Vlastimil Jansa =

Czech chess grandmaster (born 1942)

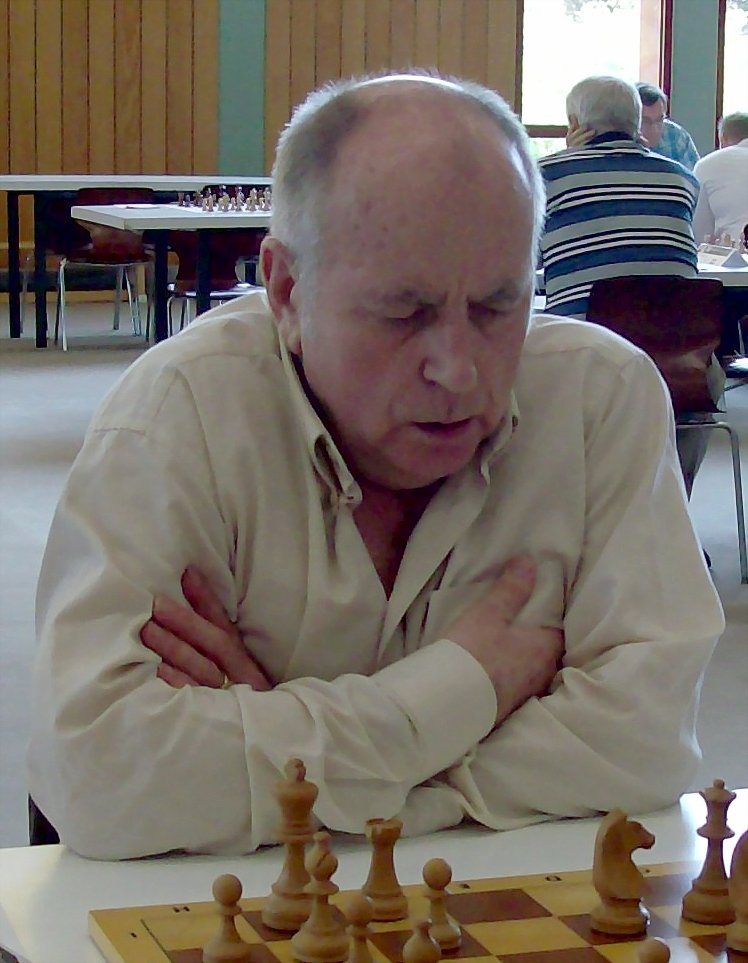

Personal information
- Born: 27 November 1942 (age 83) Prague, Protectorate of Bohemia and Moravia

Chess career
- Country: Czechoslovakia, Czech Republic
- Title: Grandmaster (1974)
- Peak rating: 2540 (January 1975)
- Peak ranking: No. 36 (January 1975)

Vlastimil Jansa (born 27 November 1942) is a Czech chess player. He was awarded the titles of International Master, in 1965, and Grandmaster, in 1974, by FIDE.

== Life and career ==
Jansa was born on 27 November 1942 in Prague. He learned chess while in hospital at the age of eight. At fourteen, became the youth champion of Prague. In 1959, he finished second in the Czechoslovak national junior championship. Academically, he qualified in sports sciences from the Charles University in Prague, before becoming a professional soldier and reaching the rank of captain. As part of his chess education, he studied under the tutelage of International Masters Emil Richter (1894–1971).

Jansa has been one of Czechoslovakia's and then the Czech Republic's leading players for many years, collecting experience across a range of chess activities. Representing his country at the Chess Olympiad on a number of occasions, he won a team silver medal in 1982. He has also been a coach and a writer of books and theoretical articles.

Also as a trainer, he developed a test in the 1970s from which the talent of young players could be measured. The strongest player of the Czech Republic David Navara is among his students. Jansa has also been the national coach of Luxembourg.

Along with International Master Josef Přibyl, he is known as one of the creators of an opening system known as the 'Czech Pirc'. The opening, distinguished by an early c6, offers the player of the black pieces the opportunity for greater flexibility, in order that an appropriate plan can be formulated, once white's strategy is revealed.

In international tournaments, he has been many times a winner, taking outright or shared first prize at Červený Kostelec 1959, Prague 1968, Madonna di Campiglio 1973, Amsterdam 1974, Vrnjačka Banja 1981, Trnava 1982, Borgarnes 1985, Gausdal 1987 (and third in 1988), Badenweiler 1990, Münster 1992 and Lázně Bohdaneč 1997. He was a runner-up at Zinnowitz in 1964.

Jansa won the Czechoslovak Chess Championship in 1964, 1974 and 1984. Prior to the splitting into Czech Republic and Slovakia in 1993, he finished in the top three on no fewer than fourteen occasions. Post-millennium, he remains actively engaged in playing chess and finished second, taking the silver medal at the 2006 World Senior Chess Championship in Arvier, behind Viktor Korchnoi. Jansa won the 2018 World Senior Championship in the 65+ category, edging out Yuri Balashov on tiebreak score.

== Selected works ==
- Dynamics of Chess Strategy – Jansa (Batsford, 2003)
- How To Play The Pirc; A New System For Black – Jansa & Přibyl (Münster International, 1988)
- The Best Move – Hort & Jansa (Pitman, 1980)
