= Ladislav Alster =

Czech chess player

Personal information
- Born: 2 June 1927
- Died: 11 January 1991 (aged 63) Prague, Czech Republic

Chess career
- Country: Czechoslovakia; Czech Republic
- Title: FIDE Master (1987)

Ladislav Alster (2 June 1927 – 11 January 1991), was a Czech chess player, Czechoslovak Chess Championship winner (1956), European Team Chess Championship team medalist (1957).

== Biography ==
In the mid-1950s Ladislav Alster was one of the leading Czechoslovak chess players. He repeatedly competed in the Czechoslovak Chess Championship finals, where winning three medals: gold (Poděbrady 1956), silver (Prague 1955) and bronze (Prague 1954). In 1957, in Wageningen Ladislav Alster played in World Chess Championship Zonal tournament and ranked in 13th place. He competed in chess tournaments until 1989.

Ladislav Alster played for Czechoslovakia in the Chess Olympiad:

- In 1956, at reserve board in the 12th Chess Olympiad in Moscow (+2, =2, -3).

Ladislav Alster played for Czechoslovakia in the European Team Chess Championship:

- In 1957, at third board in the 1st European Team Chess Championship in Vienna (+0, =2, -3) and won team bronze medal.

Ladislav Alster played for Czechoslovakia in the World Student Team Chess Championships:

- In 1954, at second board in the 1st World Student Team Chess Championship in Oslo (+3, =1, -2) and won team gold medal,
- In 1956, at first board in the 3rd World Student Team Chess Championship in Uppsala (+3, =6, -0).

In 1987, Ladislav Alster published the book Šachy hra královská ("Royal game chess").
