= Pál Réthy =

Hungarian chess player

Pál Réthy (28 January 1905, Deva – 27 December 1962, Budapest) was a Hungarian chess master.

Born in Déva, Austria-Hungary. After World War I, Transylvania became part of Romania, and he moved to Hungary. He took 7th at Vienna 1926 (Rudolf Spielmann won), took 7th at Brno 1931 (Salo Flohr won), took 10th at Budapest 1931 (Hungarian Chess Championship, Lajos Steiner won), tied for 10-11th at Budapest 1932 (Géza Maróczy won), took 2nd behind Esteban Canal at Budapest 1933, tied for 9-11th at Újpest 1934 (Andor Lilienthal won), and tied for 2nd-3rd, behind Erich Eliskases, at Budapest 1934 (Maróczy Jubilee).

In 1935, he played for Hungary in the 6th Chess Olympiad in Warsaw, scoring 8.5/14 (+5 –2 =7) at first reserve board.

He tied for 11-14th at Budapest 1936 (Mieczysław Najdorf and L. Steiner won), took 5th at Teplitz-Schönau 1937 (Karl Gilg won), took 6th at Budapest 1940 (Maróczy Jubilee, Max Euwe won), and took 8th at Munich 1941 (Europaturnier, Gösta Stoltz won). After World War II, he tied for 13-14th at Budapest 1950 (HUN-ch, László Szabó, took 16th at Budapest 1955 (HUN-ch, Gedeon Barcza won), and tied for 13-14th at Budapest 1961 (HUN-ch, Lajos Portisch won).
