= Pavel Blatný =

Czech chess grandmaster (born 1968)

Personal information
- Born: 22 June 1968 (age 58) Brno, Czechoslovakia

Chess career
- Country: Czech Republic
- Title: Grandmaster (1993)
- Peak rating: 2589 (October 2000)

Pavel Blatný (born 22 June 1968) is a Czech chess grandmaster.

== Early life ==
Pavel Blatný was born on 22 June 1968 in Brno, Czechoslovakia.

== Career ==
Blatný tied with Josef Klinger for second in the 1985 World Junior Chess Championship (which was won by Maxim Dlugy). He became an International Master in 1986. He was the champion of Czechoslovakia in 1988 and 1990, and earned the grandmaster title in 1993. He won the New York Open Tournament in 1995, and was the champion of the Czech Republic in 1997 and 2000. In 2000, Blatný tied for first place at the U.S. Masters Chess Championship.Also in 2000, he was one of eight grandmasters who tied for first in the World Open chess tournament, which was won by Joel Benjamin after a blitz playoff. His other first-place finishes include at the 1998 National Open, in which he tied for first with Jaan Ehlvest, Vladimir Epishin, Julian Hodgson and Evgeny Pigusov. He also shared first place at the 2000 Chesswise International Tournament with Ehlvest, and at the 38th American Open in 2002 with Yury Shulman.

== Opening repertoire ==
Blatný often plays the London System in an attacking style, and, unlike most people who play this system, does not play h2-h3. Instead, he tends to castle queenside and try to launch an attack on his opponent's king.
