= Aron Zabłudowski =

Polish chess player

Aron Zabłudowski (1909 – August 1941) was a Polish chess master.

He was a co-organizer of the Białystok Chess Club in September 1924, and became a secretary of the club in 1937. He won the Białystok City Championship in 1926 and drew a simultaneous game with Alexander Alekhine the same year. In further editions of the Białystok Championship, he shared first with Izaak Małamed in 1928, took 4th in 1933, tied for 2nd–4th in 1934, and won again in 1938. He also successfully represented Białystok in the North-Eastern Region of the Polish championships in 1934 and 1938.

During World War II, he stayed in Białystok over the period 1939–1941, while under Soviet occupation. At the beginning of the Soviet-German War he, a Jew, was murdered with other Jews in a burning synagogue in Białystok by an Einsatzgruppe in August 1941.
