= Ludovit Potuček =

Slovak chess player

Ľudovít Potúček (16 April 1912 – 27 July 1982) was a Slovak chess master.

In 1941, he tied for 2nd-3rd with József Szily, behind Jan Foltys, in Trenčianske Teplice (Trentschin-Teplitz, Trencsénteplic), and played at second board against Braslav Rabar (0.5 : 1.5) in a match Croatia–Slovakia at Zagreb 1941.

After World War II, he tied for 10-12th at Zlín 1945 (Petar Trifunović won). Potúček played for Czechoslovakia in friendly matches against England at London 1947, MCCU at Birmingham 1947, France at Paris 1947, and Netherlands at The Hague 1947.
