= József Szily =

Hungarian chess player

József Szily (2 October 1913, Budapest – 26 April 1976) was a Hungarian chess master.

In 1939, he took 12th in Stuttgart (1st Europa Turnier, Efim Bogoljubow won). In 1941, he tied for 2nd-3rd with Ludovit Potuček, behind Jan Foltys, in Trenčianske Teplice (Trentschin–Teplitz, Trencsénteplic). In 1942, he took 2nd, behind Gösta Danielsson, in Munich (1st European Championship – Europameisterschaft, Wertungsturnier – Qualification Tournament).

After World War II, he took 3rd place at Budapest 1947 (HUN-ch, Gedeon Barcza won). In 1949, he took 11th in Trenčianske Teplice (Gideon Ståhlberg won). In 1952 he tied for 3rd-4th in Międzyzdroje, and 11-12th in Budapest (Maróczy Memorial; Paul Keres won).

He played for Hungary at third board in the 10th Chess Olympiad at Helsinki 1952 (+6 –2 =6).

He was awarded the IM title in 1950.
