= Karel Opočenský =

Czechoslovak chess player (1892–1975)

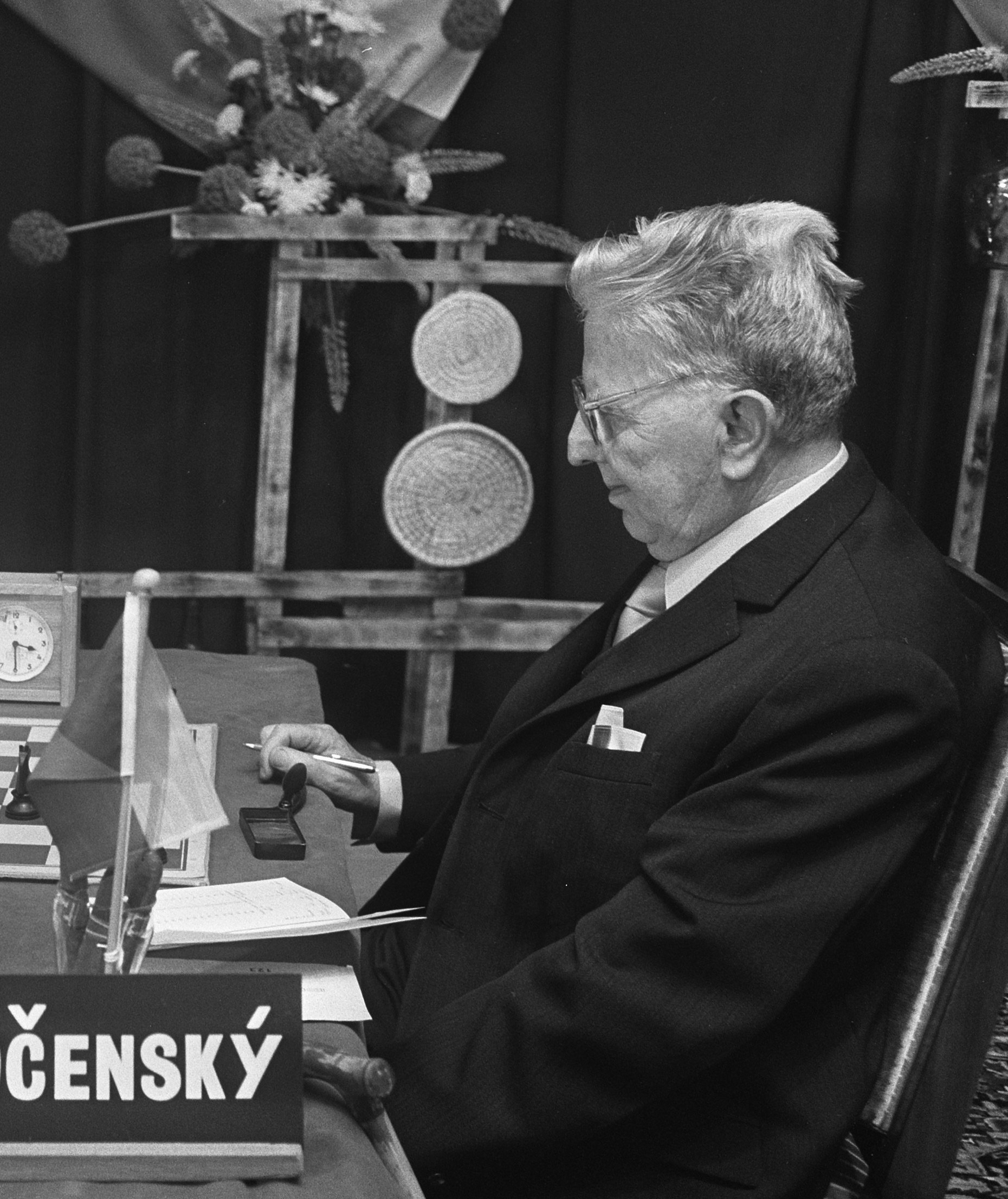
- Opočenský in 1969

Personal information
- Born: 7 February 1892 Most, Austria-Hungary
- Died: 16 November 1975 (aged 83) Prague, Czechoslovakia

Chess career
- Country: Czechoslovakia
- Title: International Master (1950); International Arbiter (1951)

Karel Opočenský (7 February 1892 – 16 November 1975) was a Czechoslovak chess master.

== Chess career ==
Opočenský was four-time Czech Champion (1927, 1928, 1938, and 1944). In 1919, he took 2nd, behind František Schubert, in Prague (Czechoslovak Chess Championship). In 1925, he tied for 3rd–4th in Paris (Alexander Alekhine won). In 1927, he won in Česke Budějovice (CSR-ch). In 1928, he won in Brno (CSR-ch). In 1933, he won at Prague (the 10th Václav Kautský Memorial). In 1935, he took 4th in Bad Nauheim (Efim Bogoljubow won).

In 1935, Opočenský took fourth place in Łódź (Savielly Tartakower won). In 1935, he won in Luhačovice. In 1936, he took second place, behind Henryk Friedman, in Vienna. In 1937, he took second, behind Karl Gilg, in Teplice. In 1938, he won in Nice. In 1938, he tied for first with Hermann in Prague (CSR-ch).

Opočenský played for Czechoslovakia four times in the Chess Olympiads.

- In 1931, he played at fourth board in 4th Chess Olympiad in Prague (+7−2=4).
- In 1933, he played at fourth board in 5th Chess Olympiad in Folkestone (+10−0=3).
- In 1935, he played at second board in 6th Chess Olympiad in Warsaw (+5−4=6).
- In 1939, he played at first board in 8th Chess Olympiad in Buenos Aires (+8−5=4).

He won individual gold and team silver medals at Folkestone 1933 and at Prague 1931, team bronze.

When World War II broke out, Opočenský, Jan Foltys, and František Zíta were playing for the Bohemia and Moravia team in the 8th Chess Olympiad in Argentina. They chose to return home, whilst teammates Jiří Pelikán and Karel Skalička elected to remain in South America.

In 1940, Opočenský took second, behind Foltys, in Rakovnik (Bohemia and Moravia-ch). In 1941, he drew a match with Foltys in Prague (+4−4=4) and took 7th in Trenčianske Teplice (Foltys won). He also placed 13th in the Munich 1941 chess tournament (Europa Turnier), the event being won by Gösta Stoltz. In 1942, he tied for 4–5th in Prague (Duras Jubileé) behind joint winners, Alekhine and Klaus Junge. In 1943, he took 3rd in Prague (B&M-ch; Zita won). In 1944, he won in Brunn (B&M-ch).

After the war, Opočenský played in several international and local (Czechoslovakia) tournaments. In 1945, he tied for 2nd–3rd, behind Emil Richter, in Prague. In 1946, he took 4th in Ostrava (CSR-ch; Luděk Pachman won). In 1946, he took 4th in London. In 1946, he tied for 1st with Daniel Yanofsky and Pachman, in Arbon. In 1947, he took 4th in Vienna. In 1949, he tied for 3rd–6th in Vienna. In 1949, he tied for 4–5th in Arbon. In 1956, he took 3rd in Poděbrady (CSR-ch, Ladislav Alster won).

Opočenský was awarded the International Master title in 1950, and became an International Arbiter in 1951. In 1951 and 1954, he was the chief arbiter for the World Chess Championship matches in Moscow, and also in the 10th Olympiad at Helsinki 1952, and in the second Candidates Tournament at Zurich 1953.

== Legacy ==
Opočenský is also known as a theoretician. There are three opening variations named after him: the Opocensky Variation in the Grünfeld Defence (1.d4 Nf6 2.c4 g6 3.Nc3 d5 4.e3 Bg7 5.Nf3 0-0 6.Bd2), the Opocensky Variation in the Najdorf Variation of the Sicilian Defence (1.e4 c5 2.Nf3 d6 3.d4 cxd4 4.Nxd4 Nf6 5.Nc3 a6 6.Be2), and the Opočenský Opening, also known as the Trompowsky Opening (1.d4 Nf6 2.Bg5).
