= Jan Foltys =

Czech chess player (1908–1952)

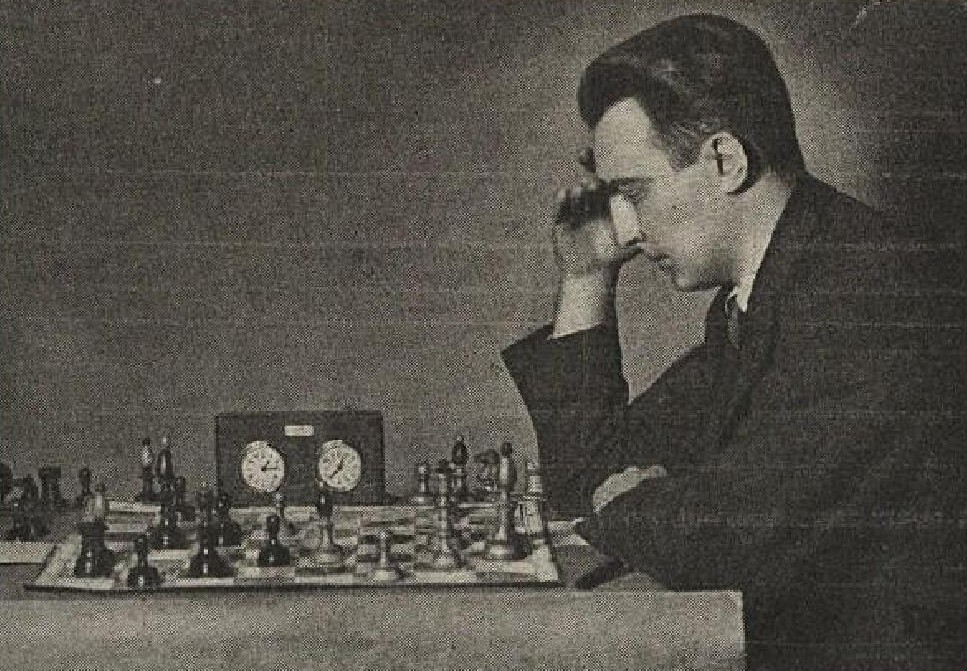
Jan Foltys

Jan Foltys (13 October 1908 – 11 March 1952) was a Czech chess International Master.

== Biography ==
Foltys was born on 13 October 1908 in Svinov. In 1933, he tied for 8-12th in Mnichovo Hradiště (13th Czech championships). In 1933, he tied for 5-7th in Moravska Ostrava; the event was won by Ernst Grünfeld. In 1935, he tied for 5-7th in Luhačovice; the event was won by Karel Opočensky. In 1936, he took 3rd in Poděbrady (14th CSR-ch); the event was won by Salo Flohr. In 1937, he took 4th in Margate. In 1937, he tied for 3rd-4th in Prague; the event was won by Paul Keres. In 1937, he tied for 2nd-4th in Rogaška Slatina; the event was won by Mieczysław Najdorf. In 1937, he tied for 9-10th in Jurata (4th POL-ch); the event was won by Savielly Tartakower. In 1938, he took 3rd in Prague (15th CSR-ch). In 1938, he tied for 10-12th in Łódź; the event was won by Vasja Pirc. In 1938, he took 11th in Ljubljana (Laibach); the event was won by Borislav Kostić. In May 1939, he took 7th in Stuttgart (1st European Tournament); the event was won by Efim Bogoljubow.

He played at first board for Czechoslovakia at 3rd unofficial Chess Olympiad in Munich in 1936 (+7 –1 =11), at second board at the 7th Chess Olympiad in Stockholm in 1937 (+7 –2 =9), and at second board at the 8th Chess Olympiad in Buenos Aires in 1939 (+8 –3 =5). Altogether in these three events, in 53 games, he scored (+22 -6 =25), for 65.1 per cent.

During World War II, Foltys played in several strong tournaments. In 1940, he won in Rakovník (Bohemia and Moravia-ch, Protektorat der Böhmen-Mähren Meisterschaft). In 1941, he won ahead of József Szily and Ludovit Potuček in Trenčianske Teplice. In September 1941, he took 7th in the Munich 1941 chess tournament (2nd European Tournament); the event was won by Gösta Stoltz. In 1941, he drew (6 : 6) a match with Karel Opočenský in Prague. In September 1942, he tied for 3rd-5th with Efim Bogoljubow and Kurt Richter, behind Alexander Alekhine, and Paul Keres, in Munich (1st European Championship, Europameisterschaft). In December 1942, he took 3rd, behind Alekhine and Klaus Junge, in Prague (Duras Jubileé). In April 1943, he tied for 4-5th in Prague; the event was won by Alekhine. In June 1943, he took 5th in Salzburg; the event was won by Keres and Alekhine. In 1943, he tied for 1st-2nd with František Zíta in Prague (B&M-ch). In 1943, he took 2nd, behind Čeněk Kottnauer, in Zlín. In 1944, he took 4th in Brno (B&M-ch, Opočenský won).

After the war, Foltys participated in tournaments and team matches. In 1946, he tied for 4-5th in Prague. The event was won by Miguel Najdorf. In 1946, he took 3rd, behind Luděk Pachman and Miroslav Katětov, in Ostrava (CSR-ch).

He played in twelve international matches. In 1947, he won (1.5 : 0.5) against Lodewijk Prins in The Hague (NED – CSR); won (2 : 0) against Harry Golombek in London (GB – CSR); won (2 : 0) against Ritson-Morry in Birmingham (MCCU – CSR); lost (0 : 2) to Nicolas Rossolimo in Paris (FRA – CSR); lost (0.5 : 1.5) to Vasja Pirc in Zagreb (YUG – CSR). In 1948, he won (1.5 : 0.5) against Svetozar Gligorić in Spindleruv Mlyn (CSR – YUG). In 1949, he won (2 : 0) against Makarczyk in Katowice (POL – CSR); won (1.5 : 0.5) against Lokvenc in Vienna (AUT – CSR); drew (0.5 : 0.5) with Kovacs in Vienna (Wien – CSR); lost (0.5 : 1.5) to Max Euwe in Prague (CSR – NED); drew (1 : 1) with Platt in Prague (CSR – AUT), and won (2.5 : 0.5) against Szabados in Venice (ITA – CSR).

Foltys had his best tournament result at Karlovy Vary / Mariánské Lázně in 1948. In the same year, he took 3rd in Budapest. In 1949, he tied for 1st with Stojan Puc in Vienna (3rd Schlechter Memorial), tied for 4-7th in Venice, and took 6th in Trenčianske Teplice. In 1950, he took 7th in Szczawno-Zdrój. In 1950, he took 13th in Amsterdam. He qualified in Mariánské Lázně in 1951 for the Interzonal of Stockholm 1952, but died of leukaemia at Ostrava on 11 March 1952 before it took place.

He was awarded the International Master title in 1950. While Foltys never became a GM, according to ChessMetrics, he was ranked 17th in the world at his best.

== Notable chess games ==
- Jan Foltys vs Erich Eliskases, Poděbrady 1936, Sicilian Defense, Dragon, B72, 1-0
- Věra Menčíková vs Jan Foltys, Margate 1937, English, A25, 0-1
- Karel Treybal vs Jan Foltys, Rakovnik 1940, Bohemia and Moravia, Sicilian, Dragon, Classical, B74, 0-1
- Jan Foltys vs Gedeon Barcza, Munich 1942, EU-ch, Nimzo-Indian, Classical, E38, 1-0
- Jan Foltys vs Lodewijk Prins, The Hague 1947, team match, Ruy Lopez, Closed, Chigorin, C99, 1-0
- Jan Foltys vs Harry Golombek, London 1947, team match, Sicilian, Dragon, Classical, B73, 1-0
- Jan Foltys vs Vasja Pirc, Karlovy Vary 1948, Queen's Gambit Declined, Classical, D61, 1-0
- Pál Benkő vs Jan Foltys, Mariánské Lázně 1951, zonal, Zukertort Opening, Symmetrical Variation, A11, 0-1
