= Emil Richter =

Czech chess player

Emil Richter (14 January 1894 – 16 March 1971) was a Czech chess master who was born and died in Prague. He won the Czech Chess Championship in 1948 and was awarded the International Master title in 1951. Richter played in the unofficial 1936 Chess Olympiad.
