= Luděk Pachman =

Czech-German chess grandmaster, chess writer and political activist

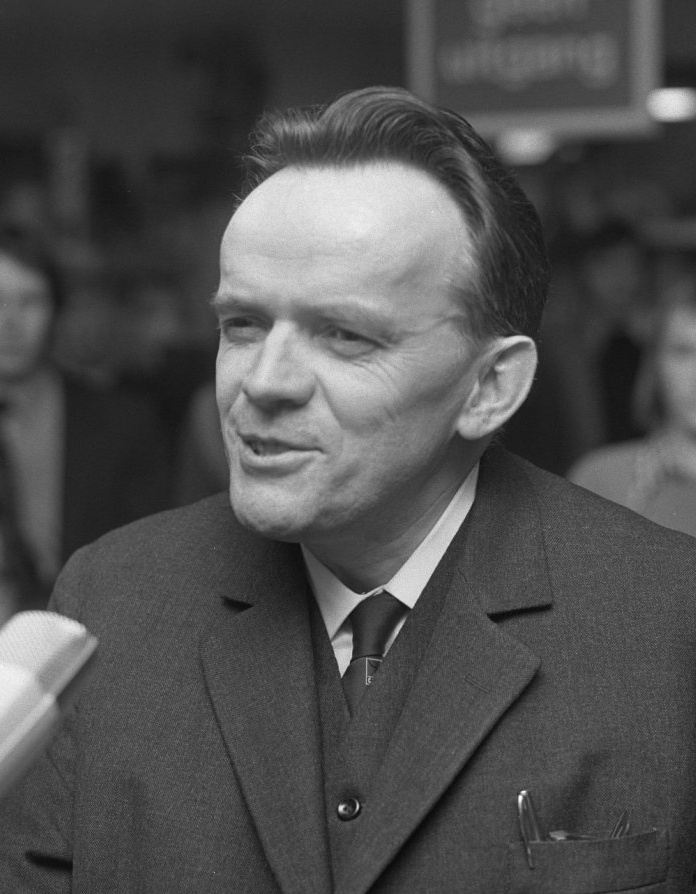
- Pachman in 1972

Personal information
- Born: 11 May 1924 Bělá pod Bezdězem, Czechoslovakia
- Died: 6 March 2003 (aged 78) Passau, Germany

Chess career
- Country: Czechoslovakia; West Germany
- Title: Grandmaster (1954)
- Peak rating: 2520 (January 1976)

Luděk Pachman (German: Ludek Pachmann; 11 May 1924 – 6 March 2003) was a Czech-German chess grandmaster, chess writer, and political activist. In 1972, after being imprisoned and tortured almost to death by the Communist regime in Czechoslovakia, he was allowed to emigrate to West Germany. He lived the remainder of his life there, and resumed his chess career with considerable success, including playing in the Interzonal in 1976 and winning the West German Championship in 1978.

== Career ==
Pachman's first chess championship came in 1940, when he became champion of the nearby village of Cista (population 900). The first break in his chess career came in 1943, when he was invited to an international tournament in Prague. World Champion Alexander Alekhine dominated the event, with Paul Keres taking second place. Pachman finished ninth in the nineteen-player tournament. Alekhine paid him a compliment in an article in the Frankfurter Zeitung and from the fifth round on, invited him every evening to analyze games and opening variations. Pachman wrote: "I don't have to tell you how a beginner from a village chess club felt at that time."

Pachman went on to become one of the world's leading players. He finished tied for second in the first European Zonal tournament, Hilversum 1947, advancing to the first Interzonal the next year. He defeated the future world champion Mikhail Botvinnik at the 1947 Chigorin Memorial in Moscow; however, Botvinnik went on to win the event.

He was awarded the International Master title in 1950 and the Grandmaster title in 1954, as FIDE formalized the process for international chess titles.

He won fifteen international tournaments, but considered sharing second place in Havana 1963, with Mikhail Tal and Efim Geller, behind Viktor Korchnoi, his best tournament result. Pachman won the Czechoslovak championship seven times between 1946 and 1966. He became the champion of West Germany in 1978. He played in six Interzonal tournaments between Saltsjöbaden 1948 and Manila 1976, with his most successful being falling a half-point short of Candidates qualification at Portoroz 1958. He represented Czechoslovakia in eight consecutive Chess Olympiads from 1952 through 1966, usually playing first board.

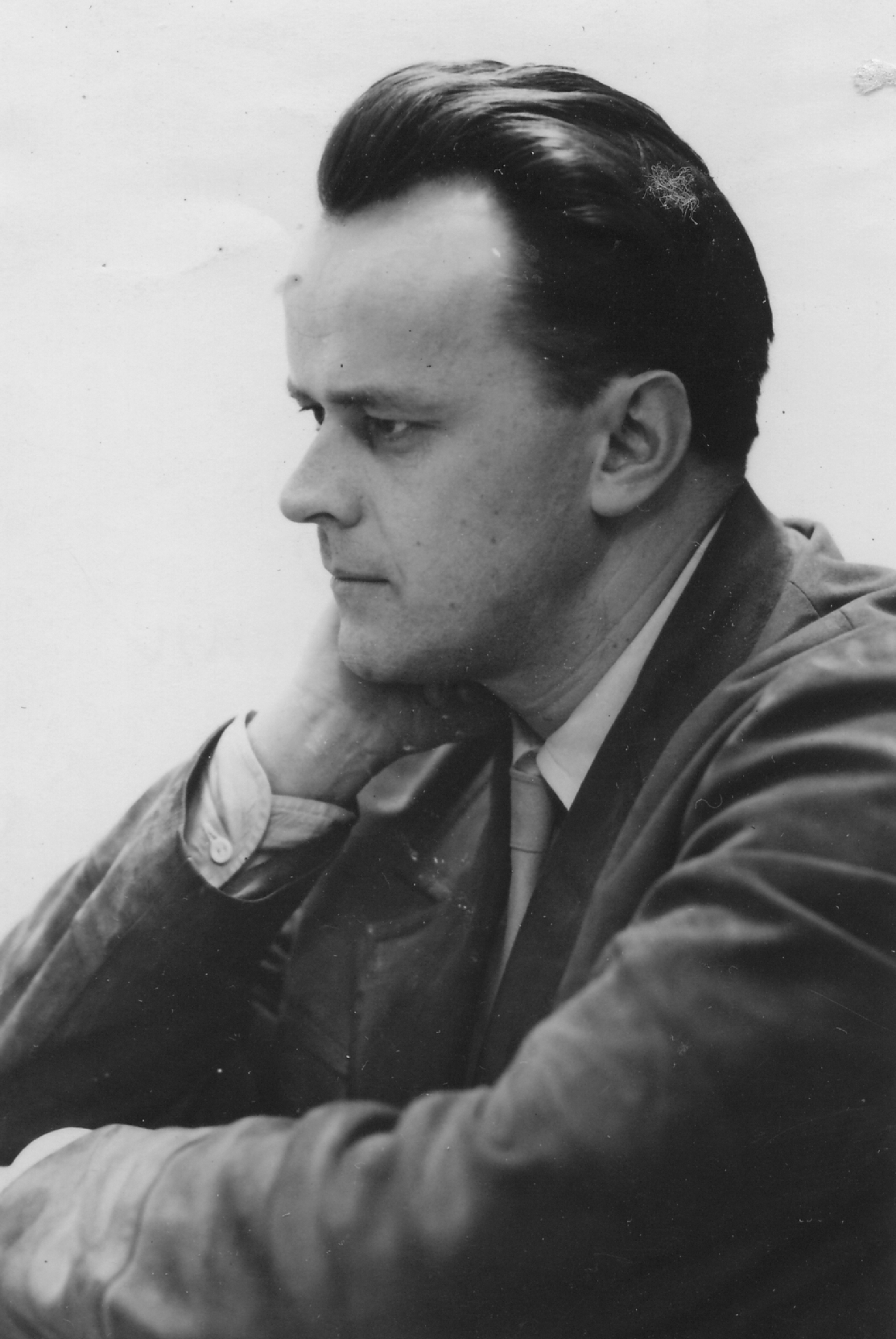
Pachman before 1970

The most successful year of his career was 1959. After winning the Czechoslovak championship he went on a South American tour, winning tournaments in Mar del Plata (tied with Miguel Najdorf); Santiago, Chile (tied with Borislav Ivkov); and Lima, Peru (again tied with Ivkov). On this tour he beat the 16-year-old Bobby Fischer twice. Pachman made an even lifetime score against Fischer, +2−2=4.

=== Politics ===
Pachman was politically active throughout his life, first as a Communist and later as a staunch anti-Communist. In December 1968, he won a tournament in Athens. Upon his return to Prague, the authorities arrested, imprisoned, and tortured him for months. During this time he attempted suicide: On Christmas Eve 1969, doctors called his wife and told her that he probably would not survive the night. In 1972, Pachman was finally allowed to emigrate to West Germany. He soon became known as a strongly anti-Communist political activist, and his eloquence made him a regular guest on political talk shows.

=== Author ===
Pachman was also a prolific author, publishing eighty books in five languages. In the 1950s, he became the world's leading opening expert with the publication of his four-volume opus, Theory of Modern Chess. Pachman considered Modern Chess Strategy, published in 1959, to be his best book. His writings covered politics as well as chess. His book Checkmate in Prague recounts his treatment at the hands of the Communist authorities.

== Major books ==
- Pachman, Luděk (1983), Chess Endings for the Practical Player, Routledge & Kegan Paul, ISBN 0-7100-9266-0
- "Decisive Games in Chess History", publisher Pitman, London, 1975.
- Pachman, Luděk (1971), Modern Chess Strategy, Dover, ISBN 978-0-486-20290-7
- Pachman, Luděk (1975), Complete Chess Strategy, Volume 1: First Principles of the Middle Game, Cornerstone Library, ISBN 0-346-12321-6
- Pachman, Luděk (1976), Complete Chess Strategy, Volume 2: Principles of Pawn Play and the Center, Cornerstone Library, ISBN 0-346-12343-7
- Pachman, Luděk (1977), Complete Chess Strategy, Volume 3: Principles of end of partie (Payot editor in french, Cornerstone Library, ISBN 0-346-12343-7

== Notable games ==
- Luděk Pachman vs. Oleg Neikirch, Portoroz 1958, Queen's Gambit Declined, Semi-Tarrasch (D41), 1–0. Pachman attacks his opponent's castled king, offering the sacrifice of both bishops. His opponent declines the second bishop, and could have continued the game with 25...Qh7!, but it is not easy to find such moves over the board in the limited time. Pachman was a good practical player and knew well where it pays to take a risk in the game.
- Luděk Pachman vs. Robert James Fischer, Santiago 1959
  1.Nf3 Nf6 2.c4 e6 3.d4 d5 4.e3 Nc6 5.Nc3 Bb4 6.Bd2 0-0 7.a3 Bxc3 8.Bxc3 Ne4 9.Qc2 a5 10.b3 b6 11.Bb2 Ba6 12.Bd3 f5 13.Rc1 Rc8 14.0-0 Rf6 15.Rfd1 Rh6 16.Bf1 g5 17.cxd5 g4 18.Bxa6 gxf3 19.gxf3 Qg5+ 20.Kf1 Rxh2 21.fxe4 Rf8 22.e5 f4 23.e4 f3 24.Ke1 Qg1+ 25.Kd2 Qxf2+ 26.Kc3 Qg3 27.Qd3 exd5 28.Rg1 Rg2 29.Rxg2 Qxg2 30.Qf1 dxe4 31.Qxg2+ fxg2 32.Rg1 Rf2 33.Bc4+ Kf8 34.Bd5 Rf3+ 35.Kc4 b5+ 36.Kc5 Ne7 37.Rxg2 Nxd5 38.Kxd5 Rxb3 39.Kxe4 b4 40.axb4 axb4 1–0
