= František Treybal =

Czech chess player

František Treybal (24 December 1882 – 5 October 1947 in Prague) was a Czech chess master.

In 1907 he won the 2nd Czech Chess Championship in Brno. In 1907 he also won in Berlin, and tied for 5–6th in Prague (Oldřich Duras won). In 1908, he took 20th in Prague (Duras and Carl Schlechter won). In 1909, he took 4th in Prague (Duras won). In 1910, he tied for 1st–2nd with Ladislav Prokeš in Prague. 1913, he won in Berlin and took 2nd, behind Karel Hromádka, in the 5th Czech Championship in Jungbunzlau (Mladá Boleslav).

After World War I he played in several tournaments in Prague. In 1921, he tied for 1st–2nd with Hromádka. In 1924, he tied for 4–5th (Jan Schulz won). In 1927, he tied for 5–8th (Hromádka won). In 1929, he took 2nd, behind Salo Flohr.

He was an elder brother of Karel Treybal.
