= Karel Treybal =

Czech chess player

Karel Treybal (2 February 1885 – 2 October 1941) was a prominent Czech chess player of the early twentieth century.

Karel Treybal

Treybal was born in Kotopeky, a village to the southwest of Prague in central Bohemia. He trained as a lawyer and became chairman of the district court in Velvary, a small town on the opposite side of Prague. Although he played chess as an amateur, Treybal was a master who participated in several major international chess tournaments. He was a younger brother of František Treybal who was also a prominent Czech chess player.

In 1905 he tied for third/fourth in the first Czech Championships in Prague (Oldřich Duras won). In 1907 he tied for second/fourth in Brno (second CZE-ch; František Treybal won). In 1908, he won in Prague (B tournament). In 1909 he took second, behind Duras, in Prague (third Cze-ch). In 1921 he tied for first/third with Karel Hromádka and Ladislav Prokeš in Brno (seventh CZE-ch).

He played for Czechoslovakia in three Chess Olympiads.

- In 1930, at second board in 3rd Chess Olympiad in Hamburg (+3 –4 =6);
- In 1933, at second board in 5th Chess Olympiad in Folkestone (+4 –3 =5);
- In 1935, at fourth board in 6th Chess Olympiad in Warsaw (+5 –1 =9).

He won team silver medal at Folkestone 1933.

Treybal's greatest international success was sixth place alongside Aron Nimzowitsch in the 1923 Karlovy Vary (Karlsbad) tournament. His performance featured a win against subsequent World Champion Alexander Alekhine.

Treybal died during the Nazi occupation of Czechoslovakia. On 30 May 1941 he was arrested, imprisoned and later charged with concealing weapons for use by resistance forces and the illegal possession of a pistol. It is not known whether these charges had any foundation. He was condemned to death and executed on 2 October. He was buried in Prague.

In 1945, a tribute to Treybal appearing in the Czech chess magazine Šach stated that Treybal had been executed without trial and had "never occupied himself with politics". Prokeš, following Treybal's death, published a monograph on him in 1946.
