= OESB-FS =

Austrian correspondence chess federation

OESB-FS (Österreichischer Schachbund – Fachgruppe Fernschach) is the correspondence chess subdivision of the Austrian Chess Federation. It was founded in 1947 and is part of the ICCF national member federation.

Correspondence chess developed relatively late in Austria, in the second half of the 19th century.

== History ==
It was not until 1865, when the Wiener Schachgesellschaft (Viennese Chess Society, founded in 1857) played a set of matches against several prominent clubs from other cities, including 1865-1866 Vienna-Insterburg 2-0, 1867-1869 Vienna- Berlin 2-0, 1872-1874 Vienna-London 0.5-1.5.

With the establishment of the Wiener Schachzeitung (Viennese Chess Bulletin) in 1898 and the beginning of Vienna's "golden era" of chess, playing chess boomed. At the same time under the protectorate of Georg Marco, the Wiener Schachzeitung organised correspondence tournaments, which attracted some of the best known masters of the day : Adolf Zinkl, Carl Schlechter, Siegfried Reginald Wolf, Heinrich Wolf and even the very young Ernst Grünfeld.

In Graz Johann Berger was the first Austrian to win an important international correspondence tournament — the Monde Illustré 1889-1892 — and he did so with a result of +45 =3 -0.

World War I brought a sudden end to this development, and it was only in the mid-twenties that Austrian correspondence chess came close to the height of pre-war interest. The Pan-European Tournaments of the new Wiener Schachzeithung under the direction of Albert Becker played an important role.

New impulses came to correspondence chess in 1928 with the establishment of the Internationaler Fernschachbund (IFSB) and the magazine Fernschach (correspondence chess), where the Austrian Franz Kunert proved to be an excellent supervisor and designing mind of the new organisation.

Over the board (OTB) International Master Hans Müller won the IFSB tournament of 1932-1933 (an unofficial correspondence chess world championship) in front of Dr. Eduard Dyckhoff and the later Austrian OTB Grandmaster Erich Eliskases.

Friendly matches with other countries began in 1930 and they were conducted regularly after 1950. In the first CC-Olympiad of European countries (an idea from Franz Kunert) 1937-1939, the Austrian team with Ernst Grünfeld, Erich Eliskases, Hans Müller, Albert Becker, Karl Poschauko and Hans Haberditz finished the finals in second place : Hungary (20.5) was first, followed by Austria (19.5) Switzerland (16) and then Portugal, Denmark and Germany.

After World War II, in 1947, Hans Schmid founded the section for correspondence chess within the Austrian Chess Federation. In the same year, Austria joined the ICCF. In 1952 the well-known correspondence chess-master Egon Spitzenberger took over the correspondence section and was its indefatigable organiser and promoter of correspondence chess until his death. The best known player of his generation was International Master Leopold Watzl who finished sixth in the finals of the world championship 1950–1953 after winning his preliminary section.

== International events with the national team ==
In team events Austria has not fared so well. Two notable exceptions were the final of the first European Team Championships 1973–1983 in which Austria claimed third place Behind the USSR and FRG with Giselbrecht, Spitzenberger and Danner playing on board 1-3; and in the fourth European Team Championships (1993–1999) when Austria finished 4th behind Germany, Italy and Switzerland.

=== Grandmaster ===
- Tunç Hamarat
- Hermann Knoll
- Christian Muck
- Friedrich Rattinger
- Harald Tarnowiecki
- Sven Teichmeister
- Wolfgang Zugrav

=== Senior International Master ===
- Andreas Burger
- Fritz Fleischanderl
- Helmut Grabner
- László M. Kovács
- Rüdiger Löschnauer
- Siegfried Neuschmied
- Maximilian Pichler
- Franz Thannhausser
- Hans Eduard Ude
- Peter Valent
- Werner Wakolbinger
- Günter Waldhauser
- Kurt Wallner

=== International Master ===
- Max Aigmüller
- Ulrich Altrichter
- Georg Danner
- Josef F. Giselbrecht
- Werner Groiss
- Rudolf Hofer
- Kurt Kaliwoda
- Oskar Kallinger
- Klaus Mayr
- Johann Poecksteiner
- Heinz Polsterer
- Johann Rehor
- Franz Rupp
- Wilhelm Rupp
- Friedrich Schaetzel
- Norbert Sommerbauer
- Leopold Watzl
- Herbert Wohlfahrt

=== Ladies Grandmaster ===
- Gertrude Schoisswohl
