= Kinzel =

Kinzel is a German surname. Notable people with the name include:

- Anton Kinzel (1922–20??), Austrian chess player
- Augustus Braun Kinzel (1900–1987), American metallurgist
- Eberhard Kinzel (1897–1945), German general
- Dick Kinzel (born 1940), American business executive, CEO of Cedar Fair Entertainment Company
- Gisela Kinzel (born 1961), German athlete
- Marianne Kinzel, mid-20th century Czechoslovak-British designer of knitted lace patterns
