= István Molnár =

István Molnár can refer to:

- István Molnár (chess player) (1933-2015), Hungarian chess player
- István Molnár (painter) (1968-1993), Hungarian painter
- István Molnár (volleyball) (1937-1999), Hungarian volleyball player
- István Molnár (water polo) (1913-1983), Hungarian water polo player
