= Anton Kinzel =

Austrian chess player

Personal information
- Born: 9 January 1922 Horn, Austria

Chess career
- Country: Austria
- Title: FIDE Master (1983)

Anton Kinzel (born 9 January 1922) was an Austrian chess FIDE Master (FM) (1983), Austrian Chess Championship medalist (1958) and Clare Benedict Chess Cup winner (1961).

== Biography ==
In the 1950s and 1960s, Anton Kinzel was one of the leading Austrian chess players. In 1951, he shared third place with Ernst Grünfeld behind Moshe Czerniak and Erik Lundin in the Carl Schlechter Memorial Tournament. In 1958, Anton Kinzel shared first place with Alexander Prameshuber in the Austrian Chess Championship but lost the additional match.

Anton Kinzel played for Austria in the Chess Olympiads:

- In 1956, at the third board in the 12th Chess Olympiad in Moscow (+4, =6, -3),
- In 1962, at the first reserve board in the 15th Chess Olympiad in Varna (+3, =2, -5),
- In 1966, at the second board in the 17th Chess Olympiad in Havana (+4, =7, -2),
- In 1968, at the first reserve board in the 18th Chess Olympiad in Lugano (+4, =7, -1),
- In 1970, at the third board in the 19th Chess Olympiad in Siegen (+0, =6, -2).

Anton Kinzel also participated in the Clare Benedict Chess Cup twelve times (1955, 1957, 1959, 1961-1965, 1967, 1969, 1974, 1977) and won one gold (1961) and four bronze (1955, 1957, 1959, 1964) medals in team competition and two gold (1961, 1964) medals in individual competition.
