= Karl Palda =

Austrian chess player

Personal information
- Born: 14 April 1907
- Died: 1986

Chess career
- Country: Austria

Karl Palda (14 April 1907 — 1986) was an Austrian chess player, Austrian Chess Championship winner (1931).

== Biography ==
In 1931, Karl Palda shared 1st place in Austrian Chess Championship. Also he in Austrian Unofficial Chess Championship won bronze (1924) medal. Karl Palda was participant in several international chess tournaments.

Karl Palda played for Austria in the Chess Olympiads:

- In 1950, at fourth board in the 9th Chess Olympiad in Dubrovnik (+1, =4, -4),
- In 1952, at reserve board in the 10th Chess Olympiad in Helsinki (+0, =2, -3).

Also Karl Palda with Austria team participated in the Clare Benedict Chess Cup (1960).
