= Ingeborg Kattinger =

Austrian chess player

Personal information
- Born: 13 December 1910 Graz, Austria
- Died: 24 January 2003 (aged 92) Vienna, Austria

Chess career
- Country: Austria

Ingeborg Kattinger (13 December 1910 – 24 January 2003), also Inge Kattinger, was an Austrian chess player. She was a four-time winner of the Austrian Women's Chess Championship, taking home the championship in 1956, 1958, 1964 and 1970.

== Early life ==
Kattinger completed grammar school and pursued a degree in teaching. She got degrees in Latin and Philosophy, minoring in Greek. She thought this combination was unhelpful for finding employment and went on to study German. She became certified to teach this as well. In 1945 Kattinger had to temporarily resign from teaching for political reasons. During these 9 years, she worked as an office manager in her uncle's and his successor's law firm. In addition, Kattinger took a Graphology seminar and earned a doctorate in Psychology.

== Career ==
Kattinger started playing chess at age seven. In 1932, she was successful in a simultaneous exhibition as the only woman against the Vienna city master Hans Müller. She played her first tournament in 1949 at the Vienna Women's City Championship where she shared first place. From then until 1983 she took part in all city championships in Vienna, winning 8 times: 1954, 1955, 1956, 1962, 1969, 1970, 1971 and 1978. In addition, she participated in Austrian Women's Chess Championships 17 times, winning them four times: 1956, 1958, 1964 and 1970, and placing second or third six times. After Austrian Women's Chess Championship in Feldkirch in 1978, where she was still second, she retired.

Kattinger played for Austria in the Women's Chess Olympiads:

- In 1963, at first board in the 2nd Chess Olympiad (women) in Split (+1, =2, -5),
- In 1966, at first board in the 3rd Chess Olympiad (women) in Oberhausen (+0, =2, -7),
- In 1969, at first board in the 4th Chess Olympiad (women) in Lublin (+1, =3, -7),
- In 1972, at first board in the 5th Chess Olympiad (women) in Skopje (+2, =2, -5),
- In 1974, at first board in the 6th Chess Olympiad (women) in Medellín (+2, =3, -6),
- In 1976, at third board in the 7th Chess Olympiad (women) in Haifa (+4, =0, -3),
- In 1980, at first reserve board in the 9th Chess Olympiad (women) in Valletta (+1, =2, -4),
- In 1982, at first reserve board in the 10th Chess Olympiad (women) in Lucerne (+0, =0, -3),
- In 1984, at first reserve board in the 26th Chess Olympiad (women) in Thessaloniki (+1, =0, -1).

Kattinger led off the women's secretary and secretary of the chess club SK Hietzing, which she served as president from 1970 to 1990, to numerous functions in the Austrian Chess Federation and also in the Vienna Chess Federation. Her special effort was always women's chess. In addition, she organized more than a dozen international women's tournaments and senior tournaments, which enjoyed great popularity both at home and abroad.

In 1982, for her work as a tournament director, she has awarded the title International Arbiter at the FIDE Congress in Thessaloniki. Kattinger was the recipient of many awards: the Silver Cross of Merit of the City of Vienna, was Honorary President of the Austrian Chess Federation, Honorary President of the Vienna Chess Federation, Honorary President of the Chess Club Hietzing.
