= Franz Auer =

Austrian chess player

Personal information
- Born: 1918
- Died: 1983 (aged 64–65)

Chess career
- Country: Austria

Franz Auer (1918 — 1983) was an Austrian chess player, Austrian Chess Championship two-times winner (1955, 1957).

== Biography ==
In the late 1950s and early 1960s, Franz Auer was one of Austria's leading chess players. He won the Austrian Chess Championships twice, in 1955 and 1957.

Franz Auer played for Austria in the Chess Olympiad:

- In 1952, at fourth board in the 10th Chess Olympiad in Helsinki (+1, =3, -5).

Franz Auer played for Austria in the European Team Chess Championships preliminaries:

- In 1957, at sixth board in the 1st European Team Chess Championship (+1, =1, -2),
- In 1961, at fourth board in the 2nd European Team Chess Championship (+1, =1, -3),
- In 1970, at eight board in the 4th European Team Chess Championship (+0, =0, -3).

Franz Auer played for Austria in the Clare Benedict Chess Cups:

- In 1953, at fifth board in the 1st Clare Benedict Chess Cu in Mont Pèlerin (+2, =2, -1) and won team silver medal,
- In 1958, at second board in the 5th Clare Benedict Chess Cup in Neuchâtel (+0, =1, -4),
- In 1959, at fourth board in the 6th Clare Benedict Chess Cup in Lugano (+1, =2, -2) and won team bronze medal,
- In 1966, at fourth board in the 13th Clare Benedict Chess Cup in Brunnen (+1, =0, -2),
- In 1972, at second board in the 19th Clare Benedict Chess Cup in Vienna (+0, =3, -2).
