= Erik Madsen =

Erik Madsen may refer to:

- Erik Madsen (boxer), Danish boxer
- Erik Madsen (chess player), Norwegian chess player

== See also ==
- Eric Madsen, American college baseball coach
