= Franz Hölzl =

Austrian chess player (born 1946)

Personal information
- Born: 6 April 1946 (age 80) Kufstein, Austria

Chess career
- Country: Austria
- Title: International Master (1985)
- Peak rating: 2440 (July 1997)

Franz Hölzl (born 6 April 1946) is an Austrian chess International Master (IM) (1985), two-times Austrian Chess Championship winner (1975, 1981).

== Biography ==
From the mid-1970s to the early 2000s, Franz Hölzl was one of Austria's leading chess players. In 1975, he first time won Austrian Chess Championship. In 1981, in Lienz Franz Hölzl repeated this success.

Franz Hölzl played for Austria in the Chess Olympiads:

- In 1976, at third board in the 22nd Chess Olympiad in Haifa (+5, =2, -3),
- In 1978, at second board in the 23rd Chess Olympiad in Buenos Aires (+5, =3, -4),
- In 1980, at second board in the 24th Chess Olympiad in La Valletta (+4, =4, -5),
- In 1982, at first board in the 25th Chess Olympiad in Lucerne (+2, =7, -4),
- In 1986, at third board in the 27th Chess Olympiad in Dubai (+2, =4, -5),
- In 1990, at fourth board in the 29th Chess Olympiad in Novi Sad (+4, =2, -5),
- In 2000, at first reserve board in the 34th Chess Olympiad in Istanbul (+5, =0, -4),
- In 2002, at first reserve board in the 35th Chess Olympiad in Bled (+3, =3, -4).

Franz Hölzl played for Austria in the European Team Chess Championships:

- In 1989, at fourth board in the 9th European Team Chess Championship in Haifa (+0, =1, -2),
- In 1997, at second board in the 11th European Team Chess Championship in Pula (+0, =1, -2).

In 1985, Franz Hölzl was awarded the FIDE International Master (IM) title.
