= Dyckhoff =

Dyckhoff is a surname. Notable people with the surname include:

- Eduard Dyckhoff (1880–1949), German chess player
- Tom Dyckhoff (born 1971), English writer, broadcaster, and historian
