= Hans Keller (disambiguation) =

Hans Keller (1919–1985) was an Austrian-born British musician.

Hans Keller may also refer to:

- Hans Keller (ice hockey) (born 1944), Swiss ice hockey player
- Hans Keller (speed skater) (born 1931), German Olympic speed skater
- Hans Keller (chess player), Austrian chess player
- Hans Peter Keller (1915–1988), German poet

== See also ==
- Hansjakob Keller (1921–c. 2008), Swiss rower
