= Karl Janetschek =

Austrian chess player (1940–2020)

Personal information
- Born: 17 April 1940
- Died: 23 November 2020 (aged 80)

Chess career
- Country: Austria
- Title: FIDE Master (1983)
- Peak rating: 2365 (January 1981)

Karl Janetschek (17 April 1940 — 23 November 2020) was an Austrian chess player and two-time Austrian Chess Championship winner (1967, 1973).

== Biography ==
From the early 1960s to the late 1970s, Karl Janetschek was one of Austria's leading chess players. He won the Austrian Chess Championship twice, in 1967 and 1973.

Karl Janetschek played for Austria in the Chess Olympiads:

- in 1960, at the fourth board in the 14th Chess Olympiad in Leipzig (+3, =6, -6),
- in 1966, at the first reserve board in the 17th Chess Olympiad in Havana (+6, =2, -4),
- in 1968, at the fourth board in the 18th Chess Olympiad in Lugano (+5, =4, -5),
- in 1970, at the second reserve board in the 19th Chess Olympiad in Siegen (+1, =5, -4),
- in 1972, at the third board in the 20th Chess Olympiad in Skopje (+7, =8, -3),
- in 1974, at the fourth board in the 21st Chess Olympiad in Nice (+9, =8, -3),
- in 1976, at the fourth board in the 22nd Chess Olympiad in Haifa (+2, =5, -3),
- in 1978, at the first reserve board in the 23rd Chess Olympiad in Buenos Aires (+0, =3, -2).

Karl Janetschek played for Austria in the European Team Chess Championship preliminaries:

- in 1970, at the third board in the 4th European Team Chess Championship (+0, =4, -2),
- in 1980, at the sixth board in the 7th European Team Chess Championship (+0, =2, -2),
- in 1983, at the eighth board in the 8th European Team Chess Championship (+0, =2, -2).

Karl Janetschek also played for Austria in the Clare Benedict Cup six times (1960, 1968, 1972, 1974, 1977, 1979) and in the Mitropa Cup twice (1977, 1979). In 1977, he won the Mitropa Cup in team competition with the Austrian team.
