= Pytlakowski =

Pytlakowski is a Polish surname. Notable people with the surname include:

- Andrzej Pytlakowski (1919–2010), Polish chess master
- Piotr Pytlakowski (1951–2024), Polish journalist and screenwriter
