= Horna (surname) =

Horna is a surname. Notable people with the surname include:

- Annett Horna (born 1987), German athlete
- Kati Horna (1912–2000), Hungarian-born Mexican photojournalist and teacher
- Luis Horna (born 1980), Peruvian tennis player

== See also ==
- Horne (surname)
