= Alexander Prameshuber =

Austrian chess player (1926–1983)

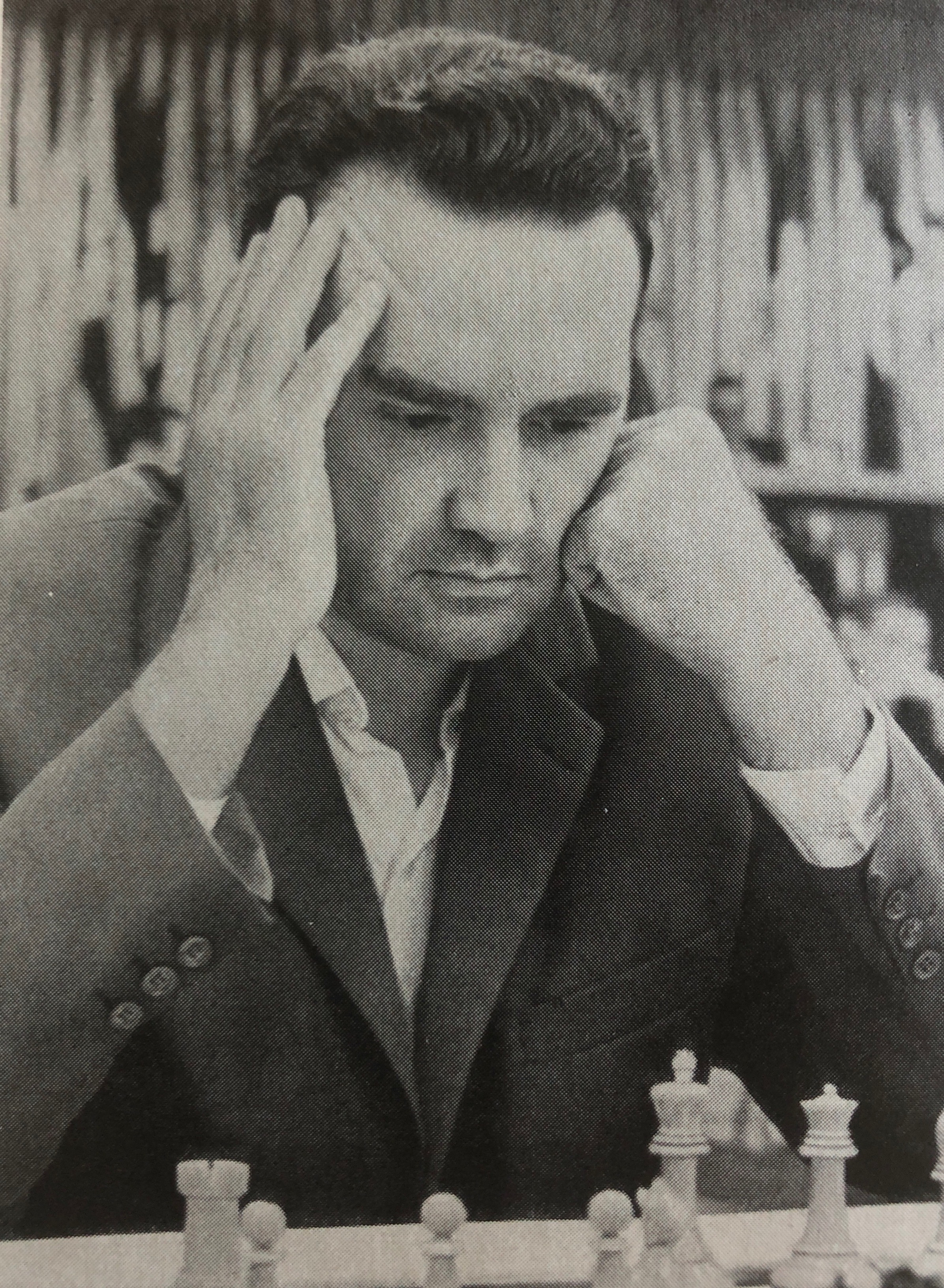
- Prameshuber in 1966

Chess career
- Country: Austria
- Title: Austrian Chess Championship winner (1958)
- Peak ranking: 155 (November 1971); ELO Rating 2539 (1971)

Alexander Prameshuber (20 November 1926 – 19 June 1983) was an Austrian chess player, and Austrian Chess Championship winner (1958).

== Personal life ==
Prameshuber played chess with his father since he was eight and intensified the game during his captivity in World War II (1944/1945) in the Vosges Mountains in France. After graduating from high school in Linz in 1946, he completed his law studies in Vienna in 1952. During this time he was a member of the Vienna Chess Club, took part in the Vienna City Championships and finished second in the State Championships in 1953 behind Josef Lokvenz.

He was the first Austrian correspondence chess championship winner from 1950 to 1952

In 1958 he became the Austrian Chess Champion.

Prameshuber represented Austria at seven Chess Olympiads (1954 Amsterdam, 1956 Moscow, 1958 Munich, 1964 Tel Aviv, 1966 Havana, 1968 Lugano and 1974 Nice).

He also defended Austria at the European Team Championships in 1957, 1961 and 1965.

In 1967 he won the Clare Benedict Chess Cup in Leysin, Switzerland, showing his best individual performance, 14th.

He always remained an amateur player. His professional career led to leading the post and telegraph directorate in Linz and Salzburg. He was always actively involved in the chess section of the post sports club.

== Private life ==
Prameshuber was born in Sierning, Austria and was married and had three daughters. His two great passions were piano and chess throughout his life. As a virtuoso classical pianist and great jazz fan, he only appeared privately. He died in 1983 in Grödig, Austria

== Tournaments ==
Prameshuber played for Austria in the Chess Olympiads:

- In 1954, at the third board in the 11th Chess Olympiad in Amsterdam (+4, =5, -4),
- In 1956, at fourth board in the 12th Chess Olympiad in Moscow (+4, =4, -4),
- In 1958, at second board in the 13th Chess Olympiad in Munich (+4, =4, -8),
- In 1964, at third board in the 16th Chess Olympiad in Tel Aviv (+5, =5, -3),
- In 1966, at first board in the 17th Chess Olympiad in Havana (+5, =10, -3),
- In 1968, at second board in the 18th Chess Olympiad in Lugano (+7, =6, -4),
- In 1974, at third board in the 21st Chess Olympiad in Nice (+5, =8, -2).

Prameshuber played for Austria in the European Team Chess Championship preliminaries:

- In 1957, at eighth board in the 1st European Team Chess Championship preliminaries (+2, =2, -0),
- In 1961, at first board in the 2nd European Team Chess Championship preliminaries (+0, =4, -1),
- In 1965, at seventh board in the 3rd European Team Chess Championship preliminaries (+2, =2, -0).

Also, Prameshuber with the Austria team won the Clare Benedict Chess Cup (1961).
