= Kalivoda =

Kalivoda (feminine: Kalivodová) is a Czech surname, sometimes germanised as Kaliwoda or Kalliwoda. Notable people with the surname include:

- Andrea Kalivodová (born 1977), Czech opera singer
- David Kalivoda (born 1982), Czech footballer
- Jan Kalivoda (1801–1866), Czech composer
- Marek Kalivoda (born 1974), Czech football manager
- Viktor Kalivoda (1977–2010), Czech spree killer
- Kurt Kaliwoda (1914—1999), Austrian chess player

== See also ==
- Kalvoda
