= 10th Chess Olympiad =

1952 chess tournament in Helsinki, Finland

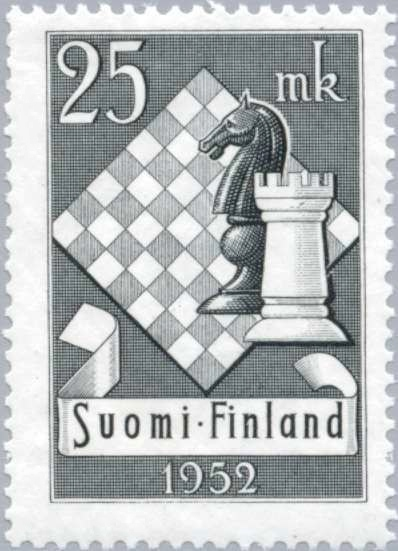
Finnish stamp dedicated to the 1952 Chess Olympiad

The 10th Chess Olympiad (Finnish: 10. Shakkiolympialaiset; Swedish: Den 10:e Schackolympiad), organized by the FIDE and comprising a team tournament, took place between August 9 and August 31, 1952, in Helsinki, Finland.

The Olympiad was especially notable for the debut of the Soviet team, who won their first gold medals and went on to completely dominate the Olympiads for the next four decades.

After the tournament, it was generally agreed that the small preliminary and final groups of only 8–9 teams left too much open to chance, since a single blunder would have an impact too big on the final standings. Consequently, FIDE decided that in the future, no final should have less than 12 participants.

== Results ==
=== Preliminaries ===
Twenty-five teams entered the competition and were divided into three preliminary groups of eight or nine teams. The top three from each group advanced to Final A, the teams placed fourth-sixth to Final B, and the rest to Final C. All groups and finals were played as round-robin tournaments.

Group 1 was won by Argentina, ahead of West Germany and Czechoslovakia. England, Denmark, and Cuba took the following places, while Iceland, Saar, and Luxembourg finished in the bottom third.

Sweden took first place in group 2, ahead of Hungary and Yugoslavia. East Germany, Austria, and Italy took places four through six, while Brazil and Norway finished seventh and eighth.

Group 3 was won by the Soviet Union, well ahead of the United States and the Finnish hosts. Israel, the Netherlands, and Poland took the following places, while Switzerland and Greece finished at the bottom.

Group 1

Final	Country	1	2	3	4	5	6	7	8	9	+	−	=	Points
«A»	Argentina	-	2	2	3½	3½	3½	3½	3½	4	6	0	2	25½
«A»	West Germany	2	-	2	2½	2½	3½	2½	4	4	6	0	2	23
«A»	Czechoslovakia	2	2	-	2½	3	3½	2½	3	4	6	0	2	22½
«B»	England	½	1½	1½	-	2	2	2½	4	4	3	3	2	18
«B»	Denmark	½	1½	1	2	-	2	1½	3	4	2	4	2	15½
«B»	Cuba	½	½	½	2	2	-	2½	2½	3½	3	3	2	14
«C»	Iceland	½	1½	1½	1½	2½	1½	-	1½	2	1	6	1	12½
«C»	Saar	½	0	1	0	1	1½	2½	-	4	2	6	0	10½
«C»	Luxembourg	0	0	0	0	0	½	2	0	-	0	7	1	2½

Group 2

Final	Country	1	2	3	4	5	6	7	8	+	−	=	Points
«A»	Sweden	-	2	2	3½	2	3½	4	4	4	0	3	21
«A»	Hungary	2	-	2½	2½	4	3	4	2½	6	0	1	20½
«A»	Yugoslavia	2	1½	-	3	2½	3	3	3½	5	1	1	18½
«B»	East Germany	½	1½	1	-	3	1½	2½	3½	3	4	0	13½
«B»	Austria	2	0	1½	1	-	2½	2	2½	2	3	2	11½
«B»	Italy	½	1	1	2½	1½	-	1	3½	2	5	0	11
«C»	Brazil	0	0	1	1½	2	3	-	3	2	4	1	10½
«C»	Norway	0	1½	½	½	1½	½	1	-	0	7	0	5½

Group 3

Final	Country	1	2	3	4	5	6	7	8	+	−	=	Points
«A»	Soviet Union	-	3	2½	3	3½	4	3½	4	7	0	0	23½
«A»	United States	1	-	1½	4	1½	2	4	4	3	3	1	18
«A»	Finland	1½	2½	-	1½	1½	3	4	3	4	3	0	17
«B»	Israel	1	0	2½	-	2½	2	4	4	4	2	1	16
«B»	Netherlands	½	2½	2½	1½	-	1½	1½	3½	3	4	0	13½
«B»	Poland	0	2	1	2	2½	-	2½	2½	3	2	2	12½
«C»	Switzerland	½	0	0	0	2½	1½	-	3	2	5	0	7½
«C»	Greece	0	0	1	0	½	½	1	-	0	7	0	4

=== Final ===
Final A
#	Country	Players	Points
1	Soviet Union	Keres, Smyslov, Bronstein, Geller, Boleslavsky, Kotov	21
2	Argentina	Najdorf, J. Bolbochán, Eliskases, Pilnik, Rossetto	19½
3	Yugoslavia	Gligorić, Rabar, Trifunović, Pirc, Fuderer, Milić	19
4	Czechoslovakia	Filip, Pachman, Šajtar, Kottnauer, Zíta, Pithart	18
5	United States	Reshevsky, Evans, Robert Byrne, Bisguier, Koltanowski, Berliner	17
6	Hungary	Szabó, Barcza, Szily, Flórián, Pogáts, Molnár	16
7	Sweden	Ståhlberg, Stoltz, Lundin, Sköld, Johansson, Danielsson	13
8	West Germany	Teschner, Schmid, Pfeiffer, Heinicke, Lange, Rellstab	10½
9	Finland	Böök, Ojanen, Kaila, Salo, Fred, Niemelä	10

Final B
#	Country	Players	Points	MP
10	Netherlands	Van Scheltinga, Prins, Donner, Cortlever, Kramer, Barendregt	21	
11	Israel	Czerniak, Oren, Porath, Aloni, Mandelbaum	19½	
12	Poland	Tarnowski, Pytlakowski, Plater, Śliwa, Litmanowicz, Grynfeld	16½	10
13	East Germany	Koch, Pietzsch, Platz, Müller	16½	7
14	Denmark	Enevoldsen J., Poulsen, Nielsen, Pedersen, Enevoldsen H.	16	
15	Cuba	Alemán, Planas, Gonzáles, Cobo Arteaga, Ortega	15	
16	England	Golombek, Penrose, Milner-Barry, Barden, Horne, Hooper	14	
17	Austria	Lokvenc, Poschauko, Beni, Auer, Palda, Keller	13	
18	Italy	Porreca, Nestler, Scafarelli, Calà, Primavera	12½	

Final C
#	Country	Players	Points	MP	Head-to-head
19	Brazil	German, Souza Mendes, Mangini, Carvalho jr., Cruz Filho, Vasconcellos	18½		
20	Greece	Gaitanaros, Tsiknopoulos, Mastihiadis, Anagnostou, Sakellaropoulos, Zografakis	13½		
21	Norway	Vestøl, Myhre, Morcken, Rojahn, Ramm, Madsen E.	13	6	2½
22	Switzerland	Grob, Müller, Morel, Bachmann P., Bhend	13	6	1½
23	Iceland	Gilfer, Ólafsson, Johnsen, Sigurðsson, Gíslason, Arnlaugsson	12½	8	
24	Saar	Lorson, Benkner, Weichselbaumer, Jost F., Jacob	12½	5	
25	Luxembourg	Doerner, Levy, Lambert H., Kremer, Barbier	1		

=== Final A ===
Place	Country	1	2	3	4	5	6	7	8	9	+	−	=	Points
1	Soviet Union	-	2½	2	2	2	2½	3	3½	3½	5	0	3	21
2	Argentina	1½	-	2½	1½	1½	3	3½	2½	3½	5	3	0	19½
3	Yugoslavia	2	1½	-	2½	2	3	2½	3	2½	5	1	2	19
4	Czechoslovakia	2	2½	1½	-	2	1½	2	3	3½	3	2	3	18
5	United States	2	2½	2	2	-	2	1½	3	2	2	1	5	17
6	Hungary	1½	1	1	2½	2	-	2½	2	3½	3	3	2	16
7	Sweden	1	½	1½	2	2½	1½	-	2	2	1	4	3	13
8	West Germany	½	1½	1	1	1	2	2	-	1½	0	6	2	10½
9	Finland	½	½	1½	½	2	½	2	2½	-	1	5	2	10

=== Final B ===
Place	Country	10	11	12	13	14	15	16	17	18	+	−	=	Points
10	Netherlands	-	2	1½	2½	2½	3½	3	3	3	6	1	1	21
11	Israel	2	-	2	3	2½	3	2½	2	2½	5	0	3	19½
12	Poland	2½	2	-	2½	1½	2½	1	2	2½	4	2	2	16½
13	East Germany	1½	1	1½	-	2	3	1½	3	3	3	4	1	16½
14	Denmark	1½	1½	2½	2	-	1½	2½	3	1½	3	4	1	16
15	Cuba	½	1	1½	1	2½	-	3	3½	2	3	4	1	15
16	England	1	1½	3	2½	1½	1	-	1½	2	2	5	1	14
17	Austria	1	2	2	1	1	½	2½	-	3	2	4	2	13
18	Italy	1	1½	1½	1	2½	2	2	1	-	1	5	2	12½

=== Final C ===
Place	Country	19	20	21	22	23	24	25	+	−	=	Points
19	Brazil	-	2½	2	2½	4	3½	4	5	0	1	18½
20	Greece	1½	-	2½	1½	1½	2½	4	3	0	3	13½
21	Norway	2	1½	-	2½	1½	2	3½	2	2	2	13
22	Switzerland	1½	2½	1½	-	1½	2½	3½	3	3	0	13
23	Iceland	0	2½	2½	2½	-	1	4	4	2	0	12½
24	Saar	½	1½	2	1½	3	-	4	2	3	1	12½
25	Luxembourg	0	0	½	½	0	0	-	0	6	0	1

=== Individual medals ===
- Board 1: (Argentina) Miguel Najdorf 12½ / 16 = 78.1%
- Board 2: (Soviet Union) Vassily Smyslov 10½ / 13 = 80.8%
- Board 3: (Soviet Union) David Bronstein 8 / 10 = 80.0%
- Board 4: (Czechoslovakia) Čeněk Kottnauer 12½ / 15 = 83.3%
- 1st reserve: (Argentina) Héctor Rossetto 8 / 10 = 80.0%
- 2nd reserve: (West Germany) Ludwig Rellstab 6½ / 9 = 72.2%
