= Pithart =

Pithart is a Czech surname. Notable people with the surname include:

- František Pithart (1915–2003), Czech chess player
- Petr Pithart (born 1941), Czech politician, lawyer, and political scientist
