= Horne (surname) =

Horne is a surname. Notable people with the surname include:

- Alexander Robert Horne (1881–1953) Scottish engineer
- Alex Horne (born 1978), British comedian and creator of Taskmaster
- Sir Alistair Horne (1925–2017), British historian
- Amelia Horne (1839–1921), (also known as Amy Haines and Amelia Bennett), British memoir writer
- Barry Horne (activist) (1952–2001), British animal-rights activist
- Barry Horne (footballer) (born 1962), Welsh footballer
- Charlotte Horne, also known as DJ Lottie
- Chris Horne (born 1994), Scottish musician
- Cora Catherine Calhoun Horne (1865–1932) was a Black suffragist, civil rights activist, and an Atlanta socialite.
- Charles Silvester Horne (1865–1914), British minister and politician
- Cleeve Horne (1912–1998), Canadian artist and sculptor
- Dennis Morton Horne (1920–2015), English chess master
- Des Horne (1939–2015), South African and English footballer
- DJ Horne (born 2000), American basketball player
- Donald Horne (1921–2005), Australian writer and social critic
- Douglas Horne (born 1966), Canadian politician
- Edmond Henry Horne (1864–1953), Canadian prospector
- Edward Horne (1835–1908), English clergyman and cricketer
- Frederick J. Horne (1880–1959), a four-star admiral in the United States Navy
- Gerald Horne (born 1949), American historian
- Henry Horne, 1st Baron Horne (1861–1929), British general
- James A. Horne, British sleep scientist and co-developer of the Morningness–eveningness questionnaire
- James H. Horne (1874–1959), American college sports coach
- James W. Horne (1881–1942), American actor, screenwriter, and film director
- James Welton Horne (1853–1922), Canadian land developer, businessman, and political figure
- Jim Horne (model) (1917–2008), American model
- John Horne (1848–1928), British geologist
- John Horne (botanist) (1835–1905), British botanist
- Kate Horne (born 1954), Canadian curler
- Kate Horne (born 1978), Previous chairwoman of the Annapolis Dragon Boating Club
- Keith Horne (born 1971), South African golfer
- Kenneth Horne (1907–1969), English comedian and businessman
- Kenneth Horne (writer) (1900–1975), English writer and playwright
- Lena Horne (1917–2010), American singer, actress, and civil rights activist
- Louise Horne (1912–2021), Trinidadian nutritionist and politician
- Marilyn Horne (born 1934), American opera singer
- Mathew Horne (born 1978), British actor and comedian
- Matt Horne (born 1970), New Zealand cricketer
- Michael Horne (1921–2000), English structural engineer
- Patricia Horne (born c. 1929), Irish doctor
- Peter Horne (bowls), New Zealand Paralympic lawn bowler
- Rachel Horne (born 1979), Northern Irish newsreader and journalist
- Richard Henry Horne (1803–1884), English poet
- Robert Horne (1871–1940), Scottish businessman, advocate, and Unionist
- Sharon Horne (disambiguation)
- Thomas Horne (disambiguation), various people
- Timmy Horne (born 1997), American football player
- William S. Horne (1963–2022), American lawyer, judge, and politician
- Willie Horne (1922–2001), British rugby league player

== See also ==
- Audrey Horne Fictional character, Twin Peaks
- Benjamin Horne Fictional character, Twin Peaks
- Horn (surname)
