= Karl Röhrl =

Austrian chess player (1941–2016)

Personal information
- Born: 11 January 1941 Wilhelmsburg, Austria
- Died: 25 February 2016 (aged 74) Wilhelmsburg, Austria

Chess career
- Country: Austria
- Title: FIDE Master (1989)
- Peak rating: 2385 (January 1975)

Karl Röhrl (11 January 1941 – 25 February 2016) was an Austrian chess player who held the FIDE title of FIDE Master (FM). He was a two-time Austrian Chess Championship winner (1969, 1971).

== Biography ==
Karl Röhrl achieved his first major chess success in 1960 when he won the Lower Austria Junior Chess Championship. In 1968, 1976 and 1983. Karl Röhrl won Lower Austria Chess Championships. With his chess club SK St. Pölten, he won the Lower Austrian regional league four times and played in the state league from 1982 to 1988.

In 1969, in Haag am Hausruck, Karl Röhrl won the Austrian Chess Championship for the first time. In 1971, in Hartberg, he repeated this success.

Karl Röhrl played for Austria in the Chess Olympiads:

- In 1970, at the fourth board in the 19th Chess Olympiad in Siegen (+8, =6, -3),
- In 1972, at the second board in the 20th Chess Olympiad in Skopje (+1, =10, -3),
- In 1974, at the first reserve board in the 21st Chess Olympiad in Nice (+4, =7, -0),
- In 1976, at the second reserve board in the 22nd Chess Olympiad in Haifa (+1, =1, -2).

Karl Röhrl played for Austria in the Clare Benedict Cup:

- In 1970, at the third board in the 17th Clare Benedict Cup in Paignton (+1, =2, -2),
- In 1971, at the fourth board in the 18th Clare Benedict Cup in Madrid (+0, =2, -2).
