= Berta Zebinger =

Austrian chess player

Personal information
- Born: unknown
- Died: unknown

Chess career
- Country: Austria

Berta Zebinger (unknown – unknown) was an Austrian chess player who won the Austrian Women's Chess Championship (1955).

== Biography ==
From the begin 1950s to the mid-1960s Berta Zebinger was one of the leading Austrian women's chess players. In Austrian Women's Chess Championship she won three medals: gold (1955) and two silver (1952, 1964).

Berta Zebinger played for Austria in the Women's Chess Olympiad:

- In 1957, at second board in the 1st Chess Olympiad (women) in Emmen (+4, =1, -6).
