= Margit Hennings =

Austrian chess player (born 1943)

Personal information
- Born: 1 March 1943 (age 83)

Chess career
- Country: Austria

Margit Hennings (born 1 March 1943) is an Austrian chess player who three times won the Austrian Women's Chess Championship (1978, 1980, 1982).

== Biography ==
From the begin of 1970s to the mid-1980s Margit Hennings was one of the leading Austrian women's chess players. In Austrian Women's Chess Championship she won four medals: three gold (1978, 1980, 1982) and silver (1976). In 1978, in Tel Aviv Margit Hennings participated in Women's World Chess Championship West European Zonal tournament. In 1982, in Bad Kissingen she participated in Women's World Chess Championship Central European Zonal tournament.

Margit Hennings played for Austria in the Women's Chess Olympiads:

- In 1976, at second board in the 7th Chess Olympiad (women) in Haifa (+3, =3, -3),
- In 1980, at first board in the 9th Chess Olympiad (women) in Valletta (+5, =3, -4),
- In 1982, at first board in the 10th Chess Olympiad (women) in Lucerne (+5, =3, -5).

Margit Hennings played for Austria in the European Women's Team Chess Championship:

- In 2003, at first reserve board in the 5th European Team Chess Championship (women) in Plovdiv (+0, =0, -2).
