= Salome Reischer =

Austrian chess player

Salome Reischer (19 February 1899 – 1980) was an Austrian chess player.

== Career ==
In 1937 she tied for 17-20th places at the 6th Women's World Chess Championship in Stockholm, won by Vera Menchik. Born in Brzezinka, after Anschluss, she moved initially to Palestine and then, via Argentina, to the United States.

In 1939, she tied for 14-16th places in the 7th Women's World Championship at Buenos Aires, where Menchik dominated again. After World War II, Reischer came back to Austria. She won the Austrian women's championship thrice: at Melk 1950, Graz 1952, and Pöchlarn 1954.

She was awarded the International Woman Master title in 1952.
