= Maria Horvath =

Austrian chess player

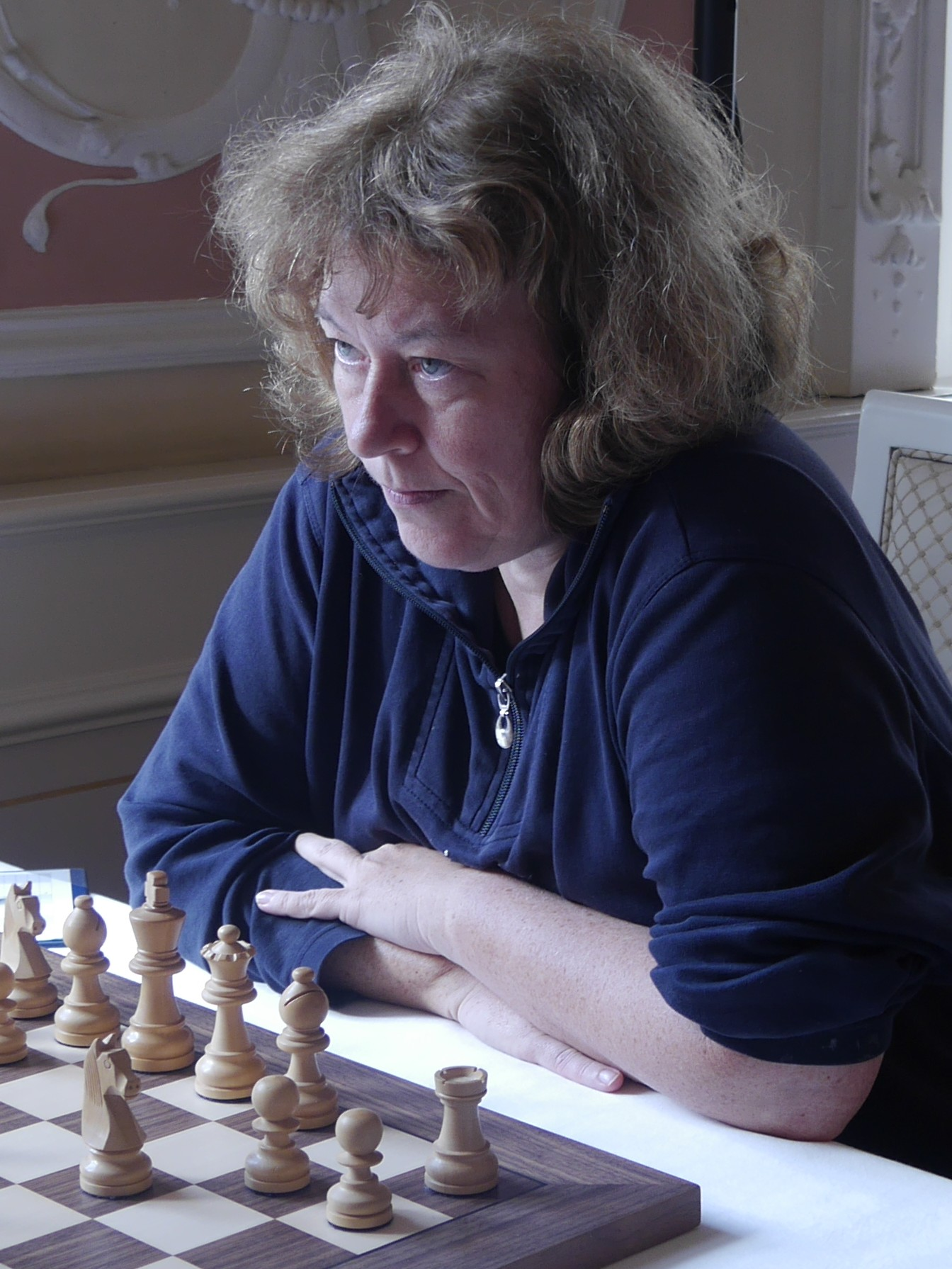
- Horvath at women's Schachbundesliga 2016/17

Personal information
- Born: 6 June 1963 (age 63)

Chess career
- Country: Austria
- Title: Woman FIDE Master (1985)
- Peak rating: 2094 (October 2004)

Maria Horvath (born 6 June 1963) is an Austrian chess player who holds the title of Woman FIDE Master (WFM). She won the Austrian women's chess championship in 1990.

== Chess career ==
Horvath started playing chess at the age of seven. Since 1982 she regularly participated in Austrian women's Chess Championships. In 1990 in Braunau am Inn she won this tournament. Also, in Austrian women's chess championships she won two silver (2002, 2004) and three bronze (1994, 1996, 1997) medals.

In European Women's Chess Club Cup, Horvath has represented Austrian chess clubs Club Carinthia and ASVÖ Pamhagen (1999, 2013, 2016).

Horvath has played for Austria in 10 Chess Olympiads (1984, 1988-1998, 2002-2006) and won individual gold medal at Board 3 in 28th Chess Olympiad (1988). She has also represented Austria in 4 European Team Chess Championships (1992-1997, 2001, 2005).
