= Veronika Exler =

Austrian chess player (born 1990)

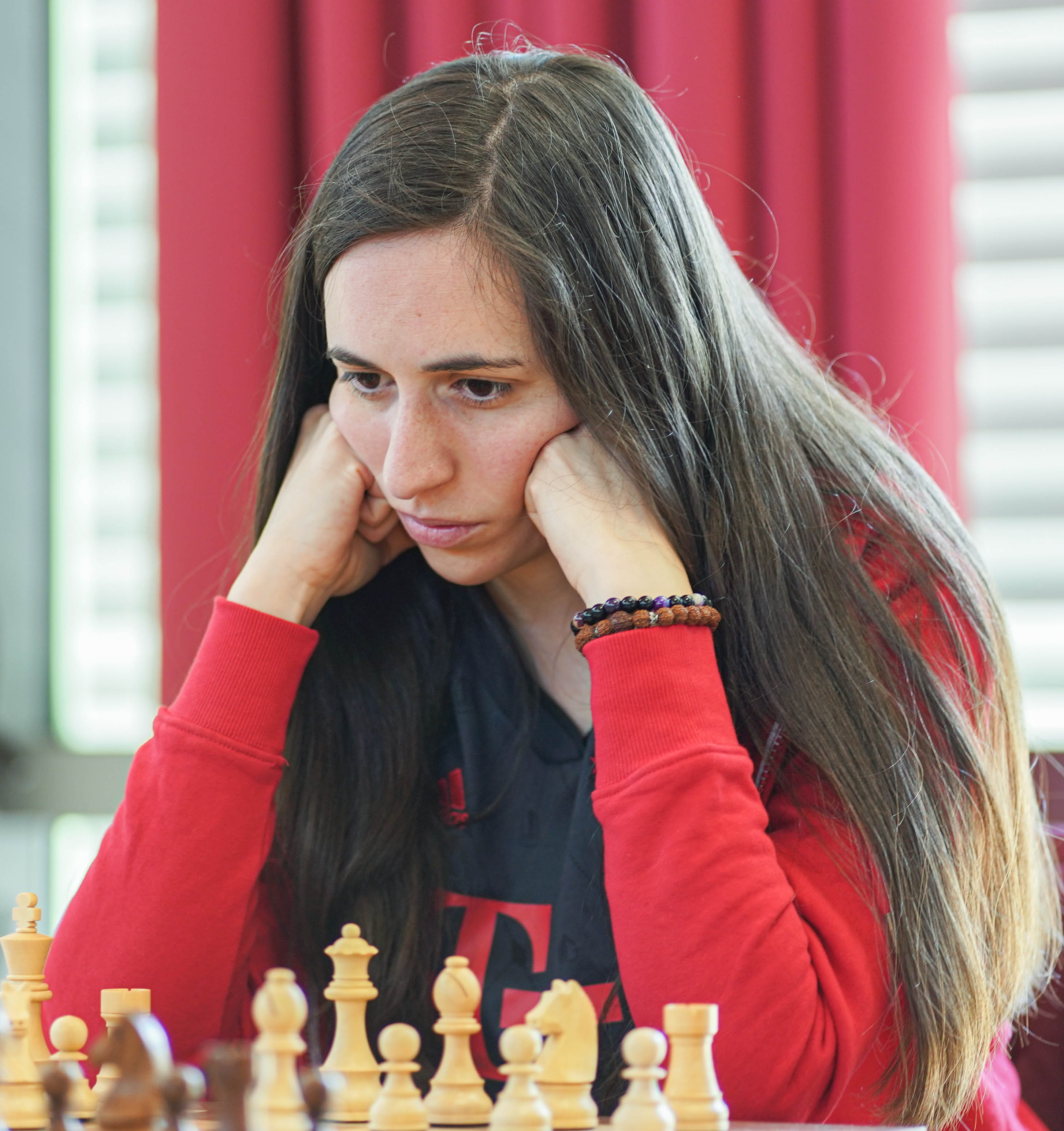
- Veronika Exler (2023)

Personal information
- Born: 24 December 1990 (age 35) Vienna, Austria

Chess career
- Country: Austria
- Title: Woman International Master (2017)
- Peak rating: 2289 (April 2019)

Veronika Exler (born 24 December 1990) is an Austrian chess player who holds the title of Woman International Master (WIM, 2017). She is a three-times Austrian Women Chess Champion (2013, 2018, 2025).

== Chess career ==
Veronika Exler started playing chess at the age of ten. Studied at University of Vienna, where she studied biology and physics.

Multiple times winner of Austrian girl's chess championships in different age groups: U14 (2004), U16 (2005, 2006), and U18 (2007).

In Austrian women's chess championships Veronika Exler won three gold (2013, 2018, 2025), two silver (2015, 2026) and three bronze (2009, 2014, 2024) medals.

Multiple Austrian women's chess Bundesliga winner with the chess club SV Wulkaprodersdorf (2011/12, 2013/14).

Veronika Exler played for Austria in the Women's Chess Olympiads:

- In 2010, at second board in the 39th Chess Olympiad (women) in Khanty-Mansiysk (+1, =2, -4),
- In 2012, at second board in the 40th Chess Olympiad (women) in Istanbul (+4, =2, -4),
- In 2014, at third board in the 41st Chess Olympiad (women) in Tromsø (+4, =3, -3),
- In 2016, at third board in the 42nd Chess Olympiad (women) in Baku (+3, =5, -2),
- In 2018, at first board in the 43rd Chess Olympiad (women) in Batumi (+3, =3, -3).

Veronika Exler played for Austria in the European Team Chess Championships:

- In 2009, at fourth board in the 8th European Team Chess Championship (women) in Novi Sad (+2, =2, -3),
- In 2011, at second board in the 9th European Team Chess Championship (women) in Porto Carras (+1, =2, -3),
- In 2013, at fourth board in the 10th European Team Chess Championship (women) in Warsaw (+2, =1, -4),
- In 2015, at third board in the 11th European Team Chess Championship (women) in Reykjavík (+3, =4, -2),
- In 2017, at third board in the 12th European Team Chess Championship (women) in Crete (+2, =3, -3).

In 2017, she was awarded the FIDE Woman International Master (WIM) title.
