= Alfreda Hausner =

Austrian chess player (1927–2019)

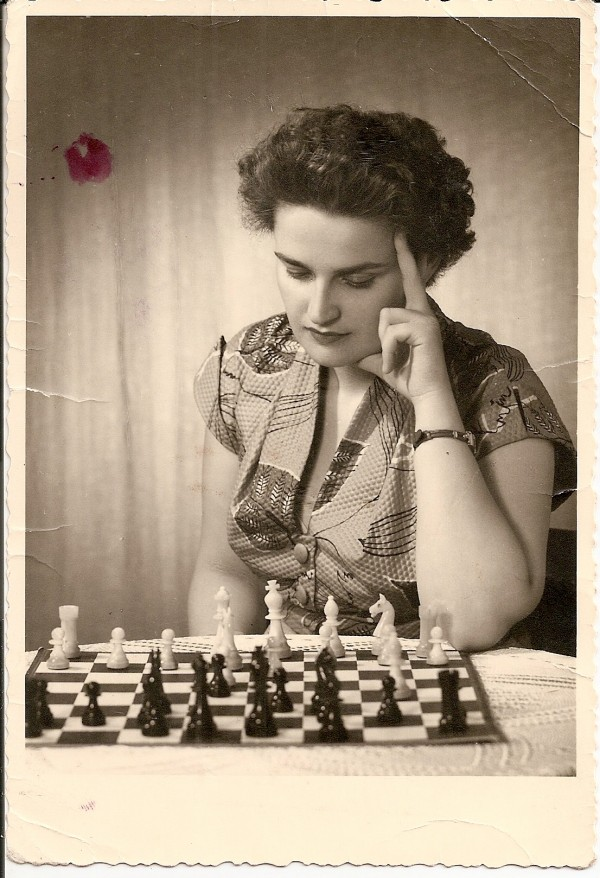
- Hausner in 1950

Personal information
- Born: 27 December 1927 Wolfsberg, Austria
- Died: April 2019 (aged 91)

Chess career
- Country: Austria

Alfreda Hausner (27 December 1927 – April 2019) was an Austrian chess player who twice won the Austrian women's chess championship (1953, 1976).

== Biography ==
Hausner was born in Carinthia on 27 December 1927, but in 1938 her parents relocated to Vienna, where she lived whole life. Seriously started playing chess at the end of World War II. Two times won Austrian women's Chess Championships (1953, 1976) and participated in many international chess tournaments. Member of Vienna chess club Sz Favoriten Wien.

Hausner played for Austria in 8 Chess Olympiads (1957, 1966, 1972–1976, 1980–1984) and won individual bronze medal at Reserve Board in 6th Women's Chess Olympiad (1974).

Successfully participated in the senior chess tournaments. In 1987 in Bad Wörishofen Hausner won a bronze medal at the World Women's Championships (S60+).

Hausner died in April 2019, at the age of 91.
