= Hans Platz =

German chess player

Personal information
- Born: 13 December 1919
- Died: 22 October 1988 (aged 68)

Chess career
- Country: Germany

Hans Platz (13 December 1919 – 22 October 1988) was a German chess player.

== Biography ==
Hans Platz was started in 1938 as an 18-year-old for Magdeburg in Bernburg chess tournament. In the 1950s he was one of the leading East Germany chess players. In 1951, in Schwerin Hans Platz won bronze medal in East Germany Chess Championship. Later he worked as association chess trainer in the East German Chess Federation.

Hans Platz played for East Germany in the Chess Olympiads:

- In 1952, at third board in the 10th Chess Olympiad in Helsinki (+6, =3, -6),
- In 1956, at second reserve board in the 12th Chess Olympiad in Moscow (+4, =4, -2).
