= Albert Mandelbaum =

Israeli chess player

Personal information
- Native name: אלברט מנדלבאום
- Born: 1925
- Died: unknown

Chess career
- Country: Israel

Albert Mandelbaum (Hebrew: אלברט מנדלבאום; 1925 – unknown) was an Israeli chess player.

== Biography ==
In the early 1950s Albert Mandelbaum was one of the leading Israeli chess players. He played mainly in domestic chess tournaments. In 1951, Albert Mandelbaum participated in Israeli Chess Championship and ranked in 4th place.

Albert Mandelbaum played for Israel in the Chess Olympiads:

- In 1952, at reserve board in the 10th Chess Olympiad in Helsinki (+2, =5, -1).
