= Michail Brodsky =

Ukrainian chess grandmaster (born 1969)

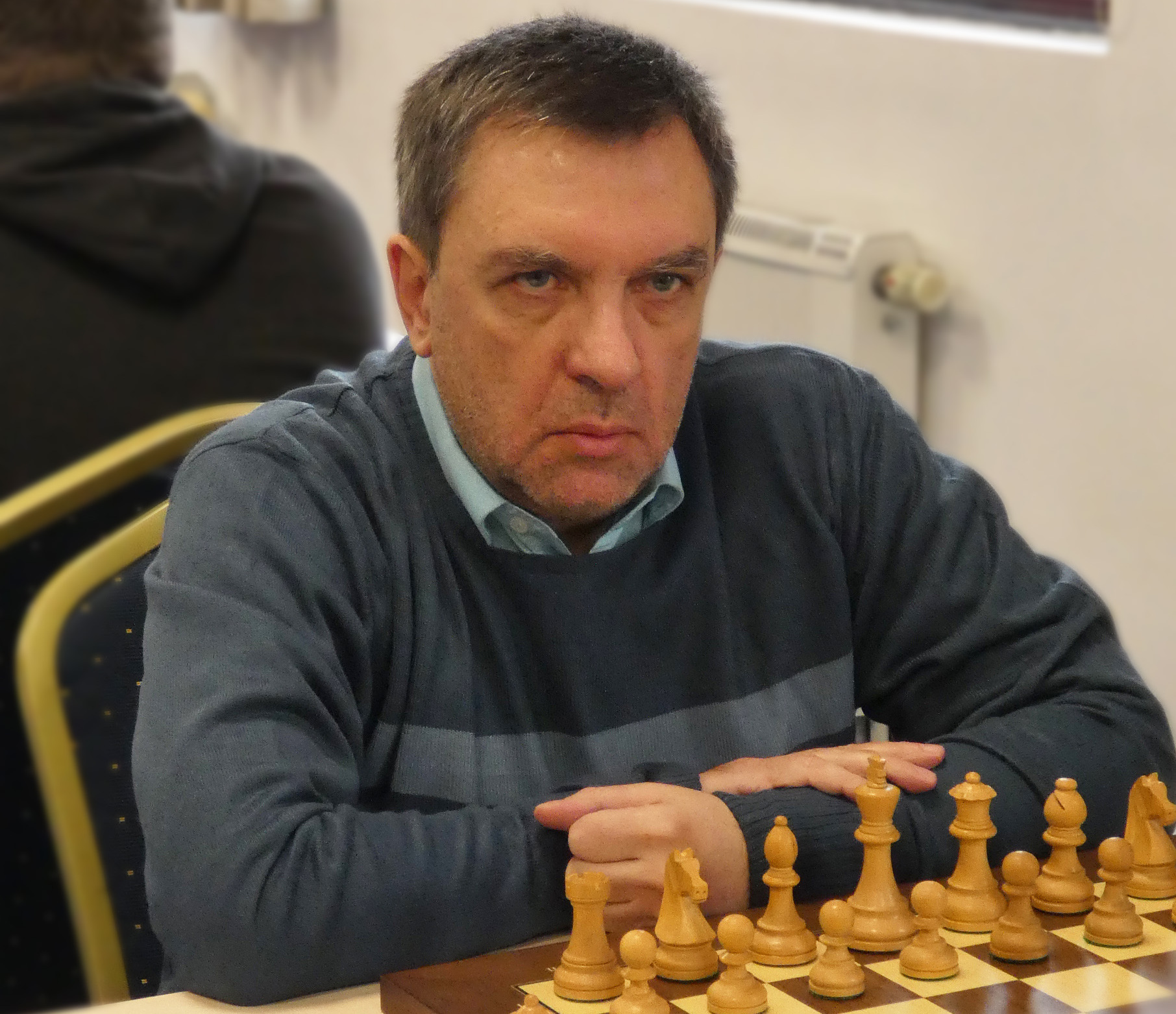
- Brodsky in 2024

Personal information
- Born: March 27, 1969 (age 57) Kharkiv, Ukrainian SSR, Soviet Union

Chess career
- Country: Ukraine
- Title: Grandmaster (1994)
- FIDE rating: 2518 (July 2026)
- Peak rating: 2597 (January 2007)

Michail Leonidovich Brodsky is a Ukrainian chess grandmaster.

== Chess career ==
In 1990, he won the Ukrainian Chess Championship.

In February 2005, he won the Cappelle-la-Grande Open alongside David Shengelia.

A skilled chess coach, he also served as the captain of the Ukrainian national women's team, The team won the 44th Women's Chess Olympiad in August 2022.

In June 2024, he participated in the GM Vadim Malakhatko Chess Memorial, where he finished 7th in the rapid section and tied for first in the blitz section. However, he placed second to Oleg Budnikov due to tiebreaks.
