= Alfred Tarnowski =

Polish chess player

Personal information
- Born: 3 March 1917 Lviv, Austria-Hungary
- Died: 24 November 2003 (aged 86) Kraków, Poland

Chess career
- Country: Poland

Alfred Tarnowski (3 March 1917 – 24 November 2003) was a Polish chess player who won the Polish Chess Championship in 1961.

== Chess career ==
He began playing chess in his native Lviv, where Tarnowski lived until 1945. After the end of World War II, he moved to Kraków. In 1946, Tarnowski made his debut in the first post-war Polish Chess Championship in Sopot, where he shared seventh place. In the next years, he participated 12 times in the Polish Chess Championship's finals and won two medals: a silver in 1949 in Poznań and a gold in 1961 in Katowice. Tarnowski participated in eight international chess tournaments.

Tarnowski was also a chess coach and theorist. In 1950, he won a theoretically valuable game against grandmaster Mark Taimanov.

Alfred Tarnowski played for Poland in Chess Olympiads:

- In 1952, at first board in the 10th Chess Olympiad in Helsinki (+4, =4, -6),
- In 1958, at second board in the 13th Chess Olympiad in Munich (+5, =8, -2),
- In 1960, at third board in the 14th Chess Olympiad in Leipzig (+4, =8, -3),
- In 1962, at fourth board in the 15th Chess Olympiad in Varna (+6, =1, -5).
