= Anna-Christina Kopinits =

Austrian chess player

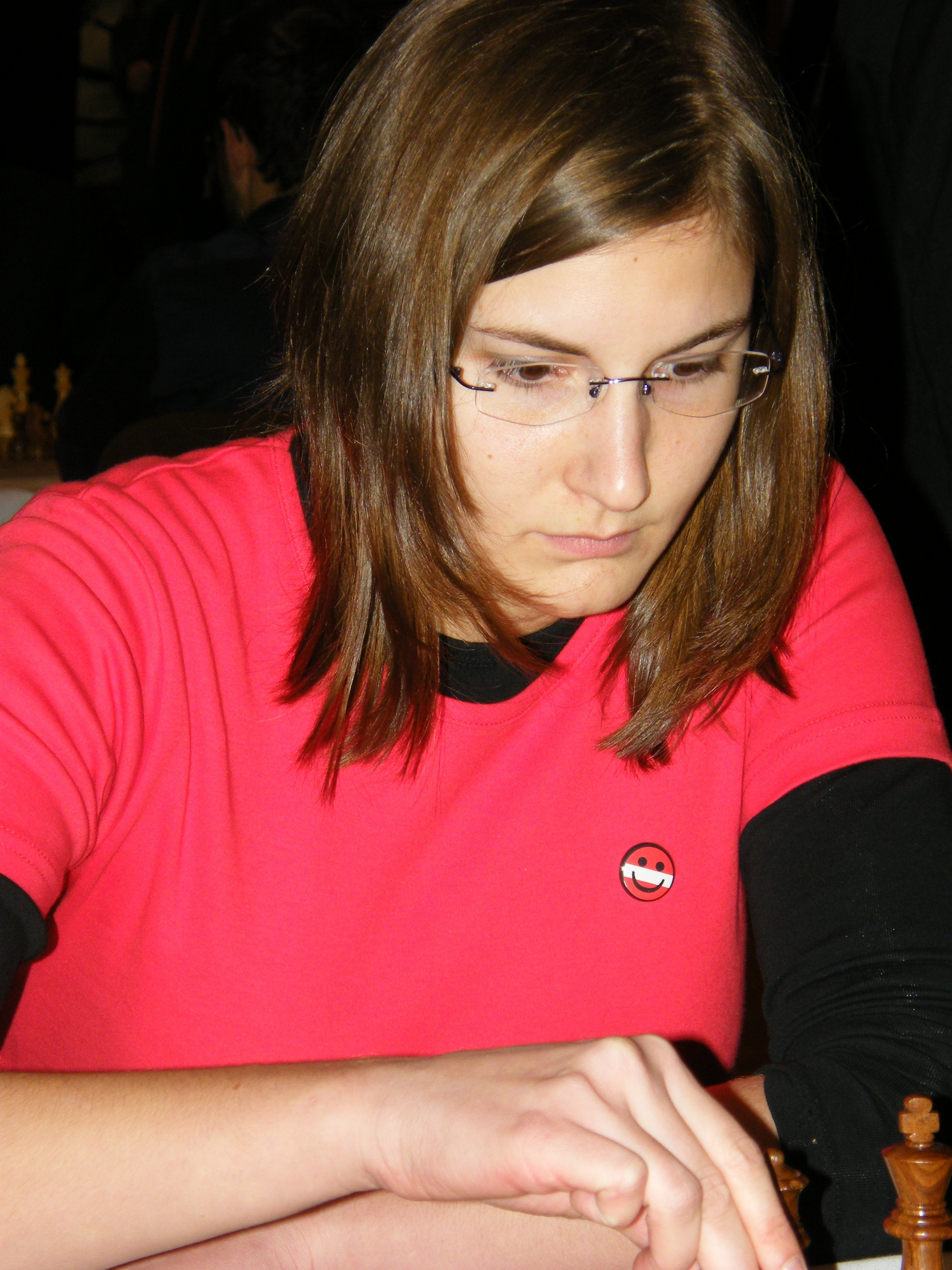
- Kopinits in 2008

Personal information
- Born: 1 April 1985 (age 41)

Chess career
- Country: Austria
- Title: FIDE Master (2017); Woman International Master (2009)
- Peak rating: 2306 (November 2018)

Anna-Christina Ragger (née Kopinits, born 1 April 1985) is an Austrian chess player. She received the FIDE titles of FIDE Master (FM) in 2017 and Woman International Master (WIM) in 2009. Her highest rating was 2306 (in November 2018) and she is ranked 4th female player in Austria.

She is the Austrian woman national champion 7 times in the years: 2003, 2006–2009, 2012, and 2017.
