= Theodoros Sakellaropoulos =

Greek chess player

Personal information
- Born: 1923
- Died: 1997 (aged 73–74)

Chess career
- Country: Greece

Theodoros Sakellaropoulos (Greek: Θεόδωρος Σακελλαρόπουλος) was a Greek chess player.

== Biography ==
In the 1950s Theodoros Sakellaropoulos was a one of leading Greek chess player. He played mainly in domestic chess tournaments and Greek Chess Championships.

Theodoros Sakellaropoulos played for Greece in the Chess Olympiads:

- In 1952, at first reserve board in the 10th Chess Olympiad in Helsinki (+1, =3, -3),
- In 1958, at fourth board in the 13th Chess Olympiad in Munich (+3, =3, -9).
