= Kalvoda =

Kalvoda (feminine: Kalvodová) is a Czech surname. Notable people with the surname include:

- Alois Kalvoda (1875–1934), Czech painter
- Jan Kalvoda (born 1953), Czech politician
- Leoš Kalvoda (born 1958), Czech football manager and former player

== See also ==
- Kalivoda
