= Elisabeth Hapala =

Austrian chess player (born 1994)

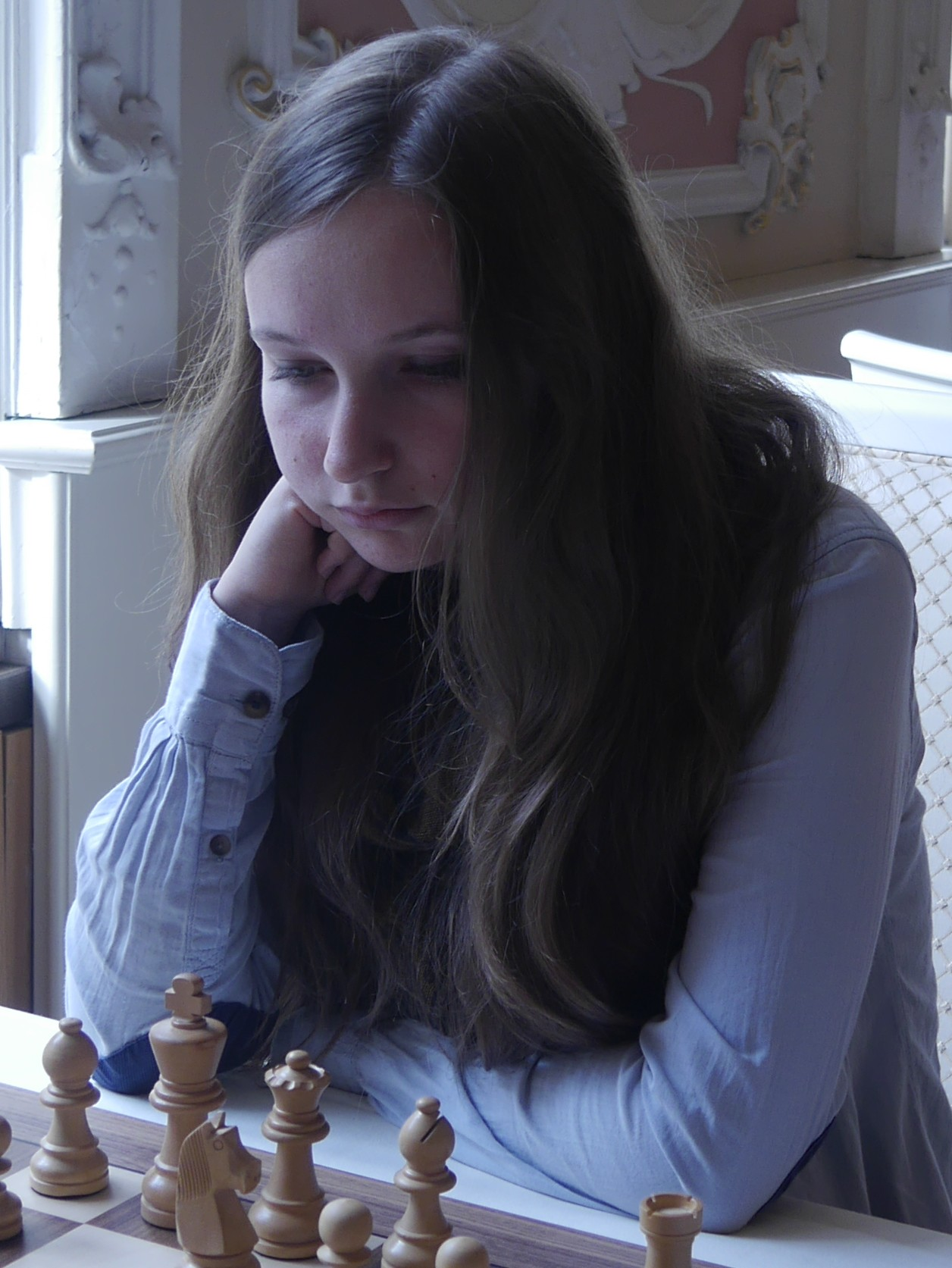
- Elisabeth Hapala in 2016

Personal information
- Born: 1994 (age 31–32)

Chess career
- Country: Austria
- Title: Woman International Master (2024)
- Peak rating: 2227 (April 2016)

Elisabeth Hapala (born 1994) is an Austrian chess Woman International Master (WIM) (2024) who won Austrian Women's Chess Championship (2020).

== Chess career ==
In 2020 in Graz Elisabeth Hapala won Austrian Women's Chess Championship.

From 2016 Elisabeth Hapala participates regularly in European Women's Individual Chess Championships.

In Austrian Women's Chess Bundesliga Elisabeth Hapala played for the chess club ASVÖ Pamhagen. She participated with this club in the European Women's Chess Club Cup twice (2013, 2016).

Elisabeth Hapala played for Austria in the Women's Chess Olympiads:

- In 2014, at reserve board in the 41st Chess Olympiad (women) in Tromsø (+3, =1, -3),
- In 2016, at reserve board in the 42nd Chess Olympiad (women) in Baku (+3, =1, -3),
- In 2022, at reserve board in the 44th Chess Olympiad (women) in Chennai (+6, =1, -3),
- In 2024, at reserve board in the 45th Chess Olympiad (women) in Budapest (+4, =2, -2).

Elisabeth Hapala played for Austria in the European Women's Team Chess Championship:

- In 2021, at second board in the 14th European Team Chess Championship (women) in Čatež ob Savi (+2, =0, -5).
