= Austrian Chess Championship =

Chess championship

The Austrian Chess Championship is held by the Austrian Chess Federation (Österreichischer Schachbund).

For its correspondence chess subdivision, see OESB-FS.

== Unofficial Championships ==
Year	City	Winner
1921	Vienna	Fritz Sämisch
1922	Vienna	Akiba Rubinstein
1923	Vienna	Anton Schara
1924	Vienna	Arthur Dünmann
1925	Vienna	Albert Becker; Siegfried Reginald Wolf
1926	Vienna	Siegmund Beutum

== Official Championships ==
- Erich Eliskases won two matches for the title against Rudolf Spielmann in 1936 (5.5 : 4.5), and in 1937 (6 : 4), both in Semmering.

Year	City	Champion
1929	Innsbruck	Erich Eliskases; Eduard Glass
1930	Graz	Franz Kunert
1931	Bregenz	Herbert Berghofer; Karl Palda
1933	Vienna	Immo Fuss
1934	Vienna	David Podhorzer
1936	Semmering *)	Erich Eliskases
1937	Semmering *)	Erich Eliskases
1947	Ischl	Leopold Lenner
1948	Horn	Karl Galia
1949	Eferding	Josef Platt
1950	Melk	Rudolf Palme
1951	Vienna	Josef Lokvenc; Thaddäus Leinweber
1952	Steyr	Karl Poschauko
1953	Wolfsberg	Josef Lokvenc
1954	Baden bei Wien	Andreas Dückstein
1955	Prein	Franz Auer
1956	Prein	Andreas Dückstein
1957	St. Johann in Tirol	Franz Auer
1958	Rif/Hallein	Alexander Prameshuber
1960	Prein	Karl Robatsch
1963	Ottenstein	Wilhelm Schwarzbach
1965	Ottenstein	Philipp Struner
1967	Graz	Karl Janetschek
1969	Haag am Hausruck	Karl Röhrl
1971	Hartberg	Karl Röhrl
1973	Loeben	Karl Janetschek
1975	Mösern ob Telfs	Franz Hölzl
1977	Mösern ob Telfs	Andreas Dückstein
1979	Lienz	Adolf Herzog
1981	Lienz	Franz Hölzl
1983	Seckau	Adolf Herzog
1985	Wolfsberg	Josef Klinger
1987	Semriach	Egon Brestian
1989	Bad Schallerbach	Alexander Fauland
1991	St. Lambrecht	Reinhard Lendwai
1993	Gamlitz	Josef Klinger
1994	Leibnitz	Alexander Fauland
1995	Voitsberg	Nikolaus Stanec
1996	Leibnitz	Nikolaus Stanec
1997	Mösern	Nikolaus Stanec
1998	Tenneck/Werfen	Nikolaus Stanec
1999	Vienna	Nikolaus Stanec
2000	Frohnleiten	Nikolaus Stanec
2001	Mureck	Siegfried Baumegger
2002	Oberpullendorf	Nikolaus Stanec
2003	Hartberg	Nikolaus Stanec
2004	Hartberg	Nikolaus Stanec
2005	Gmunden	Nikolaus Stanec
2006	Köflach	Eva Moser
2007	Tweng	Siegfried Baumegger
2008	Leoben	Markus Ragger
2009	Jenbach	Markus Ragger
2010	Vienna	Markus Ragger
2011	Linz	Georg Fröwis
2012	Zwettl	David Shengelia
2013	Gisingen/Feldkirch	Peter Schreiner
2014	Feistritz an der Drau	Mario Schachinger
2015	Pinkafeld	David Shengelia
2016	St Johann im Pongau	Georg Fröwis
2017	Graz	Andreas Diermair
2018	Vienna	Nikolaus Stanec
2019	Vienna	Nikolaus Stanec
2020	Graz	Valentin Dragnev
2021	Innsbruck	Markus Ragger
2022	Vienna	Felix Blohberger
2023	Vienna	Siegfried Baumegger
2024	Linz	Valentin Dragnev
2025	Linz	Dominik Horvath
2026	Linz	Dominik Horvath

== Official Championships (women) ==
Year	City	Champion
1950	Melk	Salome Reischer
1951	Wien	Gertrude Wagner
1952	Graz	Salome Reischer
1953	Horn	Alfreda Hausner
1954	Pöchlarn	Salome Reischer
1955	Wien	Berta Zebinger
1956	Judenburg	Inge Kattinger
1958	Maria Anzbach	Inge Kattinger
1960	Innsbruck	Ida Salzmann
1964	Hartberg	Inge Kattinger
1966	Mauerkirchen	Wilma Samt
1968	Kirchberg am Wechsel	Hermine Winninger
1970	Seggau	Inge Kattinger; Wilma Samt
1972	Rohrbach	Wilma Samt
1974	Gloggnitz	Gertrude Schoißwohl
1976	Krems	Alfreda Hausner
1978	Feldkirch	Margit Hennings
1980	Eggenburg	Margit Hennings
1982	Nüziders	Margit Hennings
1984	Kötschach-M.	Helene Mira
1986	Kirchberg am Wechsel	Jutta Borek
1988	Lienz	Jutta Borek
1990	Braunau	Maria Horvath
1992	Neumarkt	Jutta Borek
1994	Grieskirchen	Jutta Borek
1996	Grieskirchen	Helene Mira
1997	Gallspach	Sonja Sommer
1998	Tenneck/Werfen	Ursula Fraunschiel
1999	Wien	Margit Krasser
2000	Frohnleiten	Sonja Sommer
2001	Mureck	Helene Mira
2002	Oberpullendorf	Helene Mira
2003	Hartberg	Anna-Christina Kopinits
2004	Hartberg	Helene Mira
2005	Gmunden	Sonja Sommer
2006	Köflach	Anna-Christina Kopinits; Helene Mira
2007	Tweng	Anna-Christina Kopinits
2008	Leoben	Anna-Christina Kopinits
2009	Jenbach	Anna-Christina Kopinits
2010	Vienna	Eva Moser
2011	Linz	Eva Moser
2012	Zwettl	Anna-Christina Kopinits
2013	Gisingen/Feldkirch	Veronika Exler
2014	Feistritz an der Drau	Barbara Teuschler
2015	Pinkafeld	Katharina Newrkla
2016	St. Johann im Pongau	Anna-Lena Schnegg
2017	Graz	Anna-Christina Kopinits
2018	Vienna	Veronika Exler
2019	Vienna	Regina Theissl-Pokorná
2020	Graz	Elisabeth Hapala
2021	Innsbruck	Anna-Lena Schnegg
2022	Vienna	Annika Fröwis
2023	Vienna	Denise Trippold
2024	Linz	Katharina Newrkla
2025	Linz	Veronika Exler
2026	Linz	Olga Badelka
