= Fernando De Almeida Vasconcellos =

Brazilian chess player

Personal information
- Born: 29 December 1919 Rio de Janeiro, Brazil
- Died: November 1996 (aged 76) Brasília, Brazil

Chess career
- Country: Brazil

Fernando De Almeida Vasconcellos (29 December 1919 – November 1996) was a Brazilian chess player and writer who participated in several Brazilian Chess Championships.

== Biography ==
De Almeida Vasconcellos participated in twelve Brazilian Chess Championships (1948–1985) and finished second in 1950. In 1951, he represented Brazil in the World Chess Championship South America Zonal tournament.

In 1952, he played for Brazil at the 10th Chess Olympiad in Helsinki, at the second reserve board (+3, =1, -4).

From 1952 to 1954 he led the chess section of the newspaper Diário de Notícias and co-edited Chess Carioca magazine.

In 1977, he won the Brasília City Chess Championship, and in 1989 won the Brazilian Senior Chess Championship.

In his later career, he developed and actively applied the Réti opening variation 1. Nf3 Nf6 2. a4.
