= Egon Brestian =

Austrian chess player

Personal information
- Born: 28 July 1964 (age 61)

Chess career
- Country: Austria
- Title: International Master (1988)
- Peak rating: 2475 (January 1991)

Egon Brestian (born 28 July 1964), is an Austrian chess International Master (IM) (1988), Austrian Chess Championship winner (1987), Chess Olympiad individual gold medalist (1990), FIDE Trainer (2007).

== Biography ==
In 1983, Egon Brestian won Austrian Junior Chess Championship. In 1987, he won Austrian Chess Championship but in 1989, he won silver medal in this tournament. Egon Brestian was winner of many international chess tournaments in Austria: Halleiner Open in Hallein (1988), Heimo-Sommer-Gedenkturnier (2001) and Biedermeier Open (2002) in Wagna.

Egon Brestian played for Austria in the Chess Olympiads:

- In 1990, at third board in the 29th Chess Olympiad in Novi Sad (+7, =5, -0) and won individual gold medal,
- In 1994, at second board in the 31st Chess Olympiad in Moscow (+5, =3, -2),
- In 1998, at first board in the 33rd Chess Olympiad in Elista (+2, =3, -5).

Egon Brestian played for Austria in the European Team Chess Championships:

- In 1989, at second board in the 9th European Team Chess Championship in Haifa (+2, =7, -0),
- In 1999, at second board in the 12th European Team Chess Championship in Batumi (+0, =4, -2).

Egon Brestian played for Austria in the World U16 Team Chess Championship:

- In 1979, at second board in the 1st World U16 Team Chess Championship in Viborg (+5, =1, -1) and won individual gold medal.

Egon Brestian played for Austria in the Men's Chess Mitropa Cup:

- In 1991, at first board in the 14th Chess Mitropa Cup in Brno (+2, =4, -0) and won individual gold medal.

In 1987, Egon Brestian was awarded the FIDE International Master (IM) title. Also, he is known as a chess coach and organizer of chess life. Between 2006 and 2009 Egon Brestian was coach of the Austrian Chess Team. In 2007, he became a FIDE trainer. From 2007 to 2009, Egon Brestian was head of the Austrian Chess Federation Commission.
