= Wilma Samt =

Austrian chess player (1926–2016)

- Born: 28 May 1926
- Died: 15 February 2016 (aged 89)
- Children: 1 daughter
- Chess career
- Country: Austria

Wilma Samt (28 May 1926 – 15 February 2016) was an Austrian chess player who won the Austrian Women's Chess Championship three times (1966, 1970, 1973).

== Biography ==
From the mid-1960s to the begin 1980s Wilma Samt was one of the leading Austrian women's chess players. In Austrian Women's Chess Championship she won six medals: three gold (1966, 1970, 1973) and three bronze (1975, 1978, 1980). In 1966, in Arenys de Mar Wilma Samt participated in FIDE Women's World Chess Championship West European Zonal Tournament.

Wilma Samt played for Austria in the Women's Chess Olympiads:

- In 1963, at second board in the 2nd Chess Olympiad (women) in Split (+1, =3, -5),
- In 1969, at first reserve board in the 4th Chess Olympiad (women) in Lublin (+0, =2, -1),
- In 1972, at first reserve board in the 5th Chess Olympiad (women) in Skopje (+2, =2, -3),
- In 1974, at second board in the 6th Chess Olympiad (women) in Medellín (+3, =3, -2),
- In 1976, at first reserve board in the 7th Chess Olympiad (women) in Haifa (+3, =2, -1),
- In 1980, at third board in the 9th Chess Olympiad (women) in Valletta (+4, =4, -3).
