= Nikolaus Stanec =

Austrian chess player

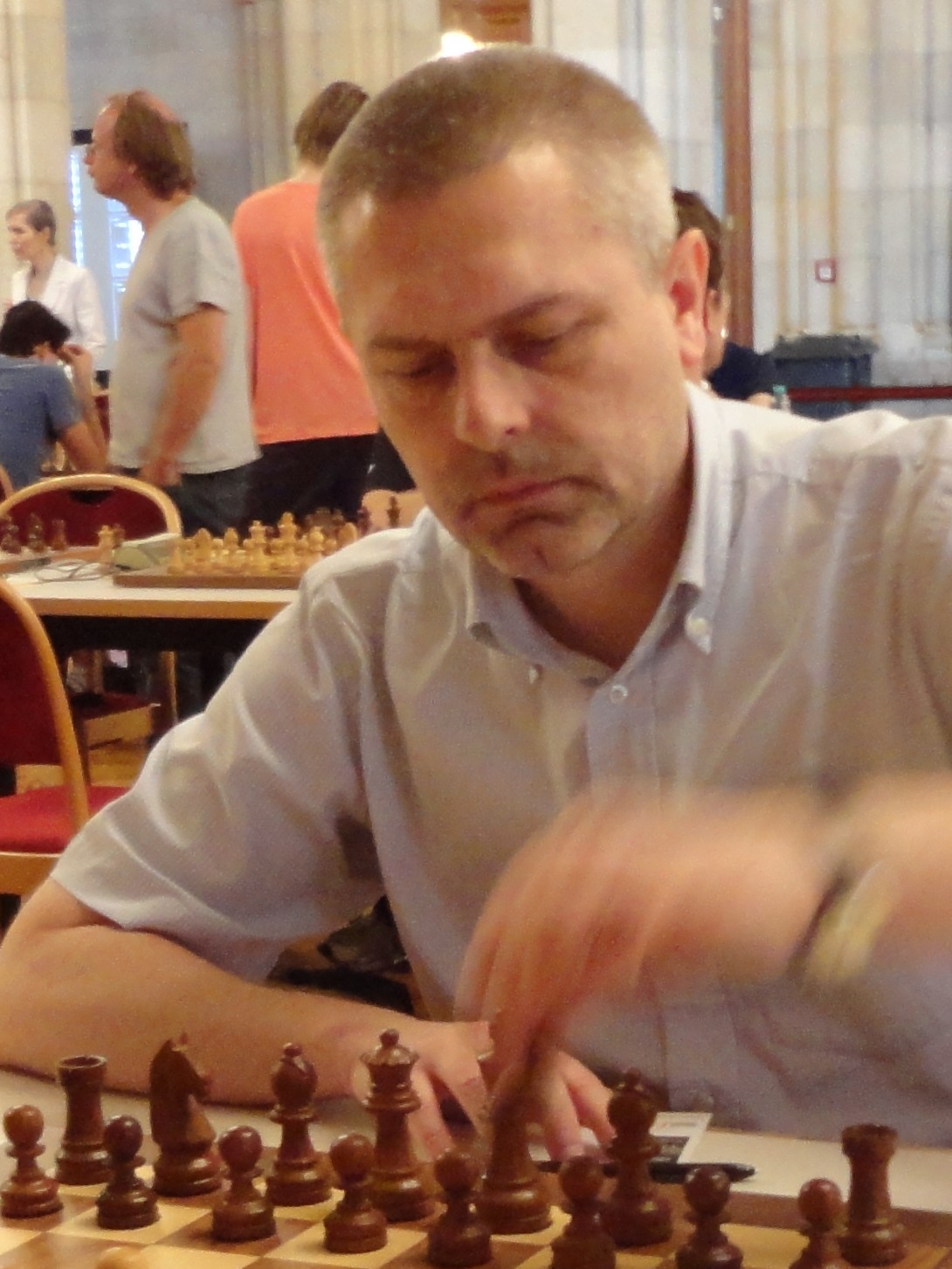

Personal information
- Born: 29 April 1968 (age 58) Vienna, Austria

Chess career
- Country: Austria
- Title: Grandmaster (2003)
- FIDE rating: 2456 (July 2026)
- Peak rating: 2568 (October 2005)

Nikolaus Stanec (born 29 April 1968, Vienna) is an Austrian chess Grandmaster (2003).

He won the Austrian Chess Championship ten times in the period 1995–2005. He also represented Austria in the Chess Olympiads of 1994 and 1996, and in the European Team Chess Championship at Pula 1997.

In 2019, he won the 2nd Vienna Christmas Open with 6/7 points.

Awarded the International Master title in 1991, and the Grandmaster title in 2003.
