= David Podhorzer =

Austrian chess player

David Podhorzer (2 August 1907 – 27 January 1998) was an Austrian chess master.

He was Austrian Champion in 1934, and represented his country in the 6th Chess Olympiad at Warsaw 1935, where he played at first reserve board (+0 –4 =2).

Podhorzer tied for 8-9th at the 15th Trebitsch Memorial at Vienna 1932 (Albert Becker won), tied for 7-8th at the 16th Trebitsch-Turnier at Vienna 1933 (Ernst Grünfeld and Hans Müller won), tied for 7-9th at the 17th Trebitsch-Turnier at Vienna 1934 (Becker won), and tied for 6-7th at the 20th Trebitsch-Turnier at Vienna 1937 (Lajos Steiner won). He took 4th place at the Döry Defence (1.d4 Nf6 2.Nf3 Ne4) tournament (Quadrangular), held in the Café Central, Vienna on 19–26 May 1937 (Paul Keres won). During World War II, he tied for 5-6th at London 1940 (Easter, Harry Golombek and Paul List won).
