= Sigurgeir Gíslason =

Icelandic chess player (1925–2003)

Personal information
- Born: 17 June 1925
- Died: 9 April 2003 (aged 77)

Chess career
- Country: Iceland

Sigurgeir Gíslason (17 June 1925 – 9 April 2003) was an Icelandic chess player.

== Biography ==
In the 1950s Sigurgeir Gíslason was one of the leading Icelandic chess players. He played mainly in domestic chess tournaments and Icelandic Chess Championships.

Sigurgeir Gíslason played for Iceland in the Chess Olympiads:

- In 1952, at first reserve board in the 10th Chess Olympiad in Helsinki (+2, =2, -2),
- In 1956, at first reserve board in the 12th Chess Olympiad in Moscow (+1, =1, -4).
