= Andreas Diermair =

Austrian chess grandmaster (born 1986)

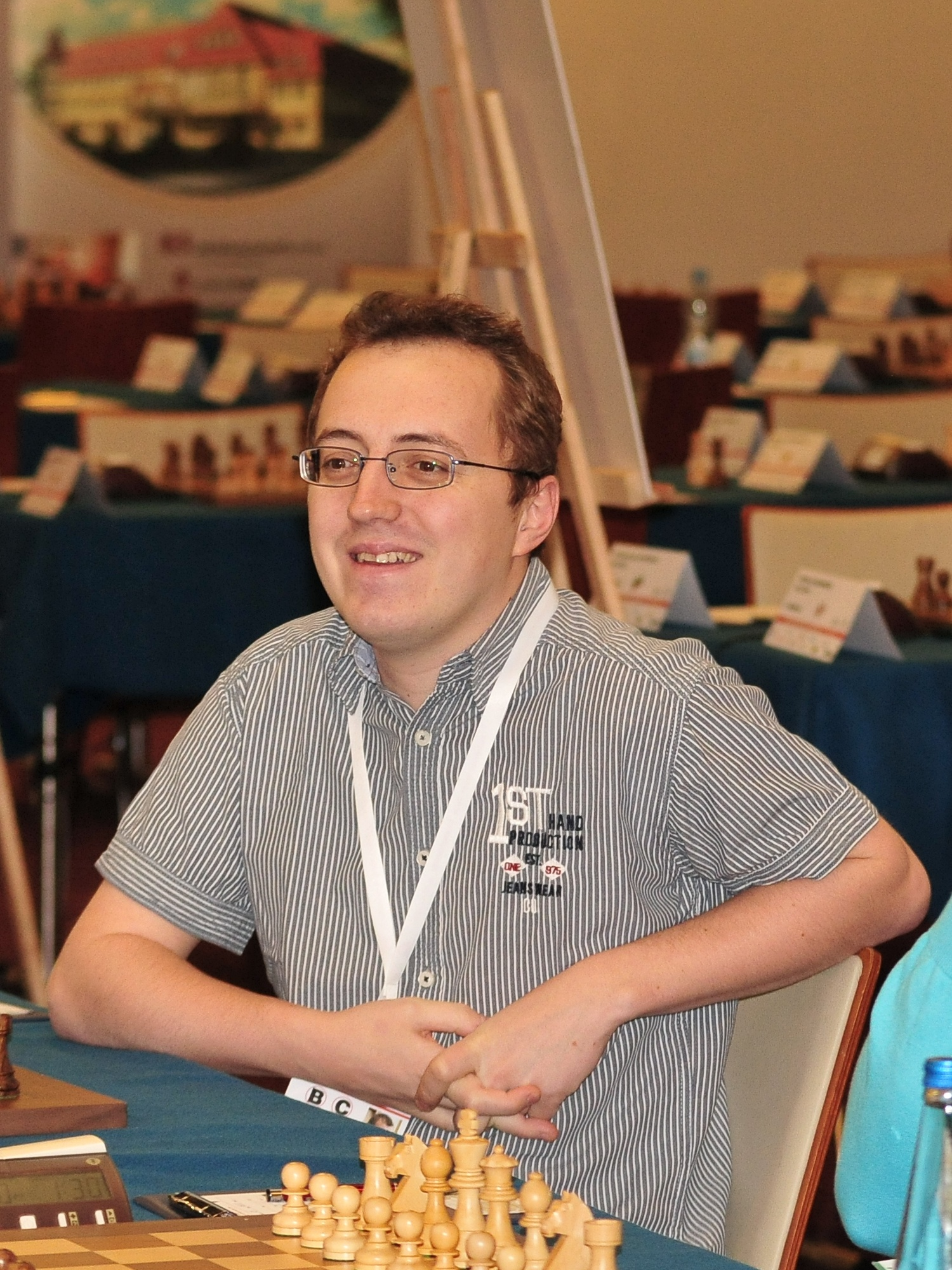
- Diermair in 2013 at the European Team Chess Championship in Warsaw

Personal information
- Born: 29 September 1986 (age 39) Deutschlandsberg, Austria

Chess career
- Country: Austria
- Title: Grandmaster (2018)
- FIDE rating: 2443 (July 2026)
- Peak rating: 2514 (April 2018)

Andreas Diermair (born 29 September 1986) is an Austrian chess grandmaster. Diermair was awarded the FIDE Master title in 2005 and the International Master title in 2008. He was awarded the Grandmaster title by FIDE in July 2018. He is ranked the 7th best player in Austria.

Diermair has played for the Frauental chess club since 1996. He played in the Chess Olympiads in the years 2014, 2016 and 2018. Diermair won the Austrian championship in 2017. He played for the Austrian national team at the Mitropa Cups in 2007 and 2011—2016. They won 3rd place in 2011 and 1st place in 2015.

Since 2019, Diermair is a 1-dan in shogi. In September 2011, he took third place at the Austria Open in Graz.
