= Satea Husari =

Syrian chess player (born 1968)

Personal information
- Born: 25 August 1968 (age 58)

Chess career
- Country: Syria
- Title: International Master (2002)
- FIDE rating: 2403 (September 2026)
- Peak rating: 2397 (January 2002)

Satea Husari (Arabic: ساطع الحصري; born 25 August 1968), is a Syrian chess International Master (IM) (2002), Chess Olympiad individual gold medalist (1990).

== Biography ==
Husari was and still one of the leading Syrian chess players from 1990s till 2020. In 2002, in Doha he with Syrian chess club Al-Mohafza was ranked third in the Arab Club Chess Championship. In 2010, in Budapest he was ranked 3rd in the International Chess Tournament First Saturday Tournament. He won South station chess tournament in USA, and also won Monise chess rapid tournament in Germany, won second rank in Gutzis chess event in Austria, and won many rapid tournaments around the World. '.

Husari played for Syria in the Chess Olympiads:

- In 1990, in the 29th Chess Olympiad in Novi Sad Won individual Gold Medal ahead of 110 players from 110 countries.

  (+5, =2, -0) on board 5.

Husari known as world traveler, an active chess trainer. He has performed in the audience with lectures and simultaneous exhibition in various countries including United States, Germany, Hungary and others.
