= David Shengelia =

Georgian-Austrian chess grandmaster (born 1980)

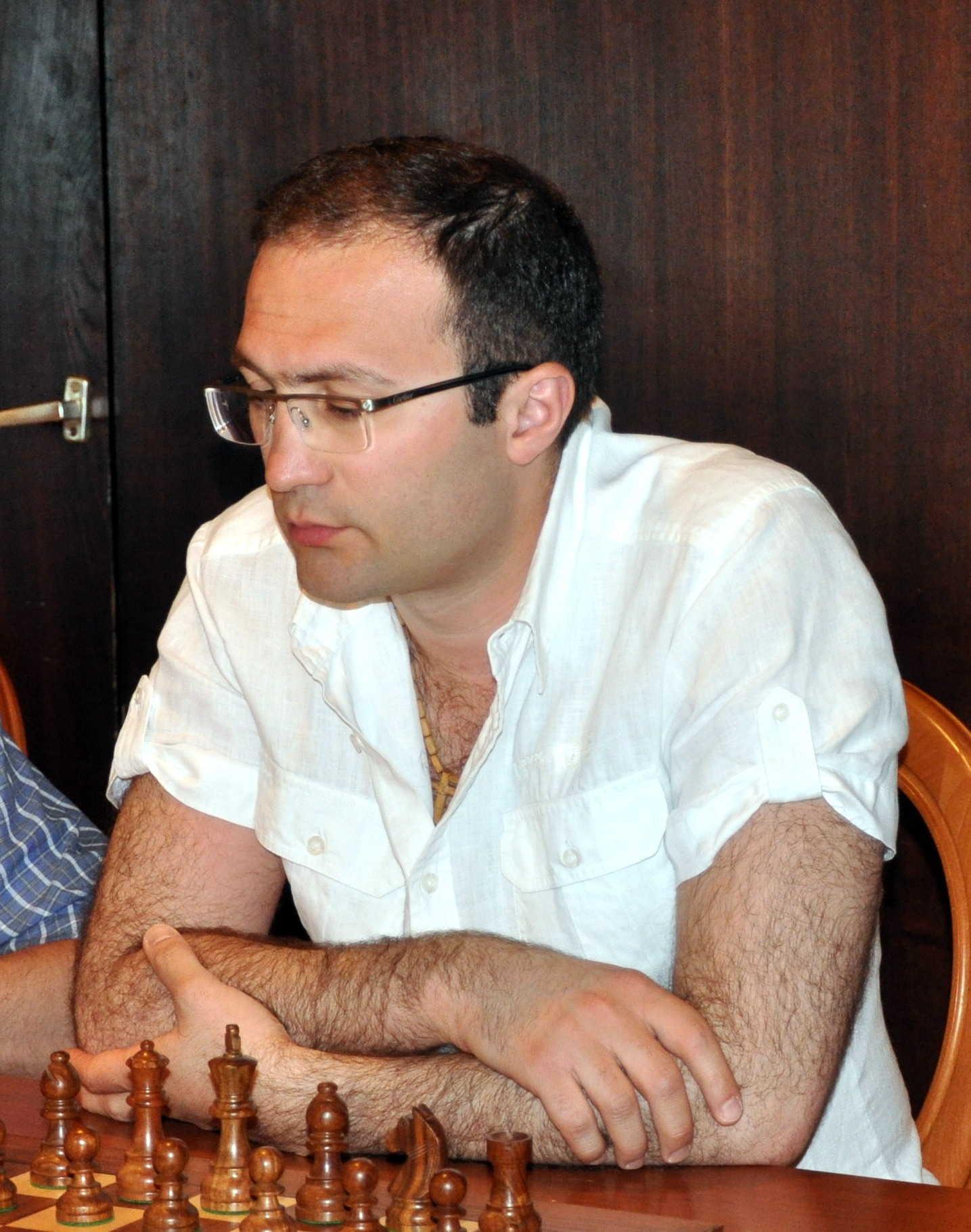
- Shengelia in 2011

Personal information
- Born: March 6, 1980 (age 46) Tbilisi, Georgia

Chess career
- Country: Georgia (until 2009); Austria (since 2009)
- Title: Grandmaster (2005)
- FIDE rating: 2507 (July 2026)
- Peak rating: 2591 (May 2010)

David Shengelia is a Georgian-Austrian chess grandmaster.

== Chess career ==
In February 2005, he won the Cappelle-la-Grande Open alongside Michail Brodsky.

In 2009, he transferred federations from Georgia to Austria, and became the trainer of the Austrian women's team.

He represented Austria in the Chess Olympiads of 2010, 2012, and 2014. He also represented Austria at the European Team Championships from 2009 to 2021.

He won the Austrian Chess Championship in 2012 and 2015.
