= Siegmund Beutum =

Austrian chess player

Personal information
- Born: 8 April 1890
- Died: 17 February 1966 (aged 75)

Chess career
- Country: Austria
- Title: National Master

Siegmund Beutum (8 April 1890 – 17 February 1966) was an Austrian chess master.

He lived in Vienna, where he played in several tournaments. He won in 1926 (an unofficial Austrian Chess Championship), shared 4th (Hexagonal, Baldur Hönlinger won) and tied for 9-10th (the 11th Trebitsch Memorial, Ernst Grünfeld won) in 1927, took 11th (the 12th Trebitsch Memorial, Grünfeld and Sándor Takács won) and tied for 13-14th in 1928 (Richard Réti won), tied for 5-6th in 1929/30 (the 13th Trebitsch Memorial, Rudolf Spielmann and Hans Kmoch won), tied for 10-12th in 1931 (the 14th Trebitsch Memorial, Albert Becker won), and tied for 11-12th in 1933 (the 16th Trebitsch Memorial, Hans Müller (chess player) and Grünfeld won).

Beutum played for Austria in the 2nd Chess Olympiad at The Hague 1928. He tied for 7-8th at Tel Aviv 1935 (the 2nd Maccabiah Games, Abram Blass won).
