= Wilfried Lange =

German chess player

Personal information
- Born: February 22, 1910 Riga, Latvia
- Died: 1993

Chess career
- Country: Germany

Wilfried Lange (22 February 1910 – 1993) was a German chess player, Chess Olympiad individual bronze medal winner (1952).

== Biography ==
In his youth Wilfried Lange lived in Braunschweig, where he won the Lower Saxony chess championship in 1933. He later moved to Essen, where he won the city chess championships. In 1952, Wilfried Lange became the winner of the North Rhine-Westphalia Chess Championship. He won two national chess tournaments in Hamburg (1946, 1952). Between 1930 and 1950 he eight times participated in German Chess Championship. Wilfried Lange twice won German Chess Bundesliga with Essen Chess Club Essener SG 1904. In 1949 he received the title of German chess master.

Wilfried Lange played for West Germany in the Chess Olympiad:

- In 1952, at reserve board in the 10th Chess Olympiad in Helsinki (+3−3=4) and won individual bronze medal.

After World War II, Wilfried Lange invested many works in restoring German chess life. He was a member of the North Rhine-Westphalia Federal Chess Federation in the German Chess Federation. By profession, Wilfried Lange was a chemist.
