= František Pithart =

Czech chess player

Personal information
- Born: 1915
- Died: October 20, 2003

Chess career
- Country: Czechoslovakia; Czech Republic

František Pithart (1915 – 20 October 2003) was a Czech chess player, and a European Team Chess Championship team bronze medal winner (1957).

== Biography ==
In the 1950s, František Pithart was one of the leading Czech chess players. He participated six times in the Czechoslovak Chess Championship finals and twice (1955, 1965) won the bronze medal. He took part in many international chess tournaments. In 1956, he shared third place in Prague, and in 1973, he took the third place in Třinec.

He represented the national team of Czechoslovakia in the largest team chess tournaments:

- in Chess Olympiad participated in 1952;
- in European Team Chess Championship participated in 1957 and won a bronze medal in the team event.
