= Erik Madsen (chess player) =

Norwegian chess player

Personal information
- Born: 21 January 1903
- Died: 24 March 1968 (aged 65)

Chess career
- Country: Norway

Erik Magnus Madsen (21 January 1903 – 24 March 1968) was a Norwegian chess player.

== Biography ==
From the late 1940s to the begin 1950s, Erik Madsen was one of the leading Norwegian chess players. In 1948, he played in Nordic Chess Championship.

Erik Madsen played for Norway in the Chess Olympiad:

- In 1952, at second reserve board in the 10th Chess Olympiad in Helsinki (+5, =1, -2).

Erik Madsen was strong Correspondence chess player. As part of the Norwegian national chess team, he participated in the 2nd (1952–1955) and 3rd (1958–1961) Correspondence Chess Olympiads.
