= Sharon Horne =

Sharon Horne may refer to:

- Sharon Horne (curler)
- Sharon Horne (psychologist)
