= Karl Poschauko =

Austrian chess player

Karl Poschauko (born 1900, date of death unknown) was an Austrian chess master.

At the beginning of his career, he took 3rd at Vienna 1921 (Albert Becker won), shared 4th and won at Linz 1924, and took 3rd at Budapest 1926. He played, with a score of 7.5/15, at Kraków 1938 (Jaroslav Šajtar won), tied for 5-7th at Gablonz (Jablonec nad Nisou) 1938 (DSV, Karl Gilg won), shared 1st with Herbert Heinicke at Graz 1941, and won in the Austrian Chess Championship at Steyr 1952.

He represented Austria in 3rd unofficial Chess Olympiad at Munich 1936, the first IFSB (Internationaler Fernschachbund) Correspondence Chess Olympiad in 1937-1939 (won team silver medal), and the 10th Chess Olympiad at Helsinki 1952. He also played in two friendly matches: Austria vs. the Soviet Union in 1953, and Austria vs. Switzerland in 1955.
