= Pierre Kremer =

Luxembourgish footballer

Personal information
- Date of birth: 4 February 1900
- Date of death: 18 October 1973 (aged 71)

International career
| Years | Team | Apps | (Gls) |
| 1927-1931 | Luxembourg | 8 | (2) |

Pierre Kremer (4 February 1900 – 18 October 1973) was a Luxembourgish footballer. He played in eight matches for the Luxembourg national football team between 1927 and 1931.
