= Clare Benedict =

American writer and patron

Clare Benedict (1870–1961) was an American writer and patron.

== Biography ==
Clare Benedict was born in Cleveland, Ohio, USA, in 1870. She was a distant relative of James Fenimore Cooper (her great-grandmother was his sister). She was wealthy and never needed to work for money; her families wealth was based on steel and oranges. She spent much of her life in Europe, travelling with her aunt, the writer Constance Fenimore Woolson (1840–1894), later with her mother Clara (1844–1923), visiting places, attending festivals, concerts and theatrical performances. She died in 1961 in Lucerne, Switzerland, where she had lived since 1941, and is buried, like her aunt and her mother, at the Cimitero Acattolico in Rome.

== Writer ==
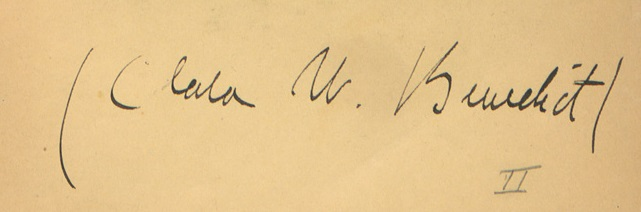
Autograph of Clare Benedict. Fondazione BEIC

Clare Benedict was a gifted writer, who published collections of tales, A Resemblance: And Other Stories (1909), XII (1921), and other books like European Backgrounds (1912), The little lost Prince (1912), The Divine Spark (1913) on Wagner, Six Months, March to August, 1914 (1914), a personal account of the months leading up to the war, and, Five Generations: 1785–1923 (1930), consisting of the three volumes Voices Out of the Past, Constance Fenimore Woolson, and The Benedicts Abroad.

== Donations ==
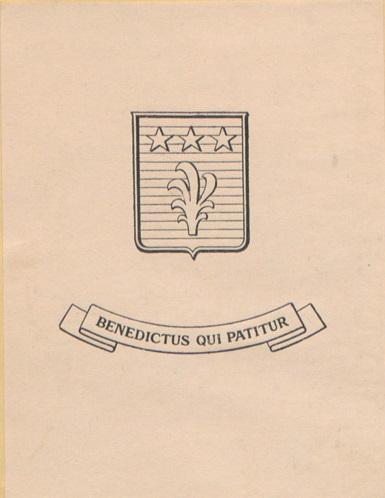
Ex libris from Clare Benedict. Fondazione BEIC

Clare Benedict is thought to be best remembered as a patron, with donations in various areas. After World War I, she started to support the Schillerstiftung in Weimar with generous gifts of food for needy writers (and was made an honorary member in 1923). She did the same again after World War II, and in 1950 helped, with a generous donation, to put the Schillerstiftung on its feet again. The Stiftung had apparently become some kind of surrogate family to her. In 1923, when her mother died, she gave funds to the Cimitero Acattolico in Rome to raise the wall around it and for other gardening work. In 1938, Rollins College in Winter Park, Florida, with her help could open Woolson House and install 'The Clare Benedict Collection' of Constance Fenimore Woolson (American author (1840 – 1894)), which also contains documents relating to Clare Benedict's life. She helped set up the Clare Benedict Cup with Alois Nagler (a Swiss chess player) and the Chess Society of Zurich, as an annual international team chess tournament for national teams from Western and Northern Europe, which was held from 1953 to 1979, until the funds ran out. There is also a tulip that carries her name: Tulipa eichleri 'Clare Benedict'.

== The Cooper Library ==
The English Department of Basel University profited from her generosity in two ways: When she lived in Basel from 1939 to 1941 she became interested in the work done in the department, conducted by her countryman Henry Lüdeke. She helped to create the "James Fenimore Cooper Stipendien-Fonds" in 1952, to support the study of Anglo-Saxon language, literature and culture, by giving the sum of US$20'000, equivalent to about US$164'000 in 2010; and on her death in 1961 she bequeathed part of her library to the department.

The library at Basel does not represent the full range of Clare Benedict's books. She obviously felt, late in her life, that the books associated with people buried at the Cimitero Acattolico in Rome should also be represented there. In 1960, shortly before her death, she put together a catalogue of the books she gave to that cemetery. As was the case with Rollins College, the gift to the English Department did not only consist of books. In a move that may tell us something about her attitude to the practice of literature, Clare Benedict also gave along the shelves, a comfortable reading chair, a kidney-shaped table, an oriental rug, even a card table (including playing cards), the bronze statue of a dog, some cutlery, a cased drinking-glass given to her as a child by Henry James, and ribbons from the funeral of Henry Irving. The collection also includes photographs and autographs: an envelope addressed by Queen Victoria to the Queen of Belgium, letters by James Fenimore Cooper, Walter Scott, and Henry James. Among the 1154 items, which cover a wide range of topics, there are first editions of works by Fenimore Cooper and Henry James, collections of newspaper clippings on Henry Irving and George Meredith, playbills of the performances Clare Benedict had seen all over Europe, musical scores, editions of Anglophone classics, guides to (mainly) Italian towns and churches, biographies, and publications that had been given to Clare Benedict. In its variety the library represents the interests of an educated American expatriate lady with a voracious interest in European culture.

== Works ==
- A Resemblance: And Other Stories. New York: G.P. Putnam's Sons, 1909.
- XII. Leipzig: Tauchnitz, 1921.
- European Backgrounds. Edinburgh: Andrew Eliot, 1912.
- The little lost Prince. Edinburgh: Andrew Eliot, 1912.
- The Divine Spark. Privately printed, 1913.
- Six Months, March to August, 1914. Cooperstown NY: Arthur H. Crist Co. 1914.
- Five Generations: 1785–1923 (1930), vol. 1–3. Voices Out of the Past, Constance Fenimore Woolson, The Benedicts Abroad. London: Ellis, 1930.
- Benedict, Clare, ed. The In Memoriam Library. Selected and Edited by Clare Benedict. Lucerne 1960.

== Other sources ==
- Cimitero acattolico, Rome: http://www.protestantcemetery.it/
- Hasler, Jörg. Switzerland in the Life and Works of Henry James. Cooper Monographs, 10. Berne: Francke, 1966.
- Olimpbase: http://www.olimpbase.org/index.html?http%3A%2F%2Fwww.olimpbase.org%2Fcbc%2Fabout.html (1-2-2011)
- Rollins College: https://web.archive.org/web/20110720035904/http://asp3.rollins.edu/olin/oldsite/archives/benedict.htm (1-2-2011)
- Schwabach-Albrecht, Susanne. "Clare Benedict (1870–1961): Schriftstellerin und Stifterin: ein Porträt" In: Deutsche Schillerstiftung von 1859:Ehrungen, Berichte, Dokumentationen 1997. Ed. Michael Krejci. Fürstenfeldbruck:. Kester-Häusler-Stiftung, 1997. 60–86.
- Schwabach-Albrecht, Susanne, "Die Deutsche Schillerstiftung 1909–1945". Archiv für Geschichte des Buchwesens 55 (2001). 1–156.
