= Kurt Kaliwoda =

Austrian chess player

Personal information
- Born: 31 December 1914
- Died: 16 November 1999 (aged 84)

Chess career
- Country: Austria
- Title: International Correspondence Chess Master (1990)

Kurt Kaliwoda (31 December 1914 — 16 November 1999) was an Austrian chess player, Austrian Chess Championship medalist (1956).

== Biography ==
From the end of 1940s to the begin of 1960s, Kaliwoda was one of Austria's leading chess players. He won bronze medal in Austrian Chess Championship in 1956. Kaliwoda participated in International Chess Tournaments in Vienna (1949, Carl Schlechter memorial) and in Lucerne (1950/1951).

He played for Austria in the Chess Olympiad:

- In 1960, at first reserve board in the 14th Chess Olympiad in Leipzig (+2, =6, -2).

Also, Kaliwoda successfully played in correspondence chess tournaments. He participated in the 2nd World Correspondence Chess Championship final (1956). He was an ICCF International Master (IM).
