= István Molnár (painter) =

- Born: January 27, 1968; Mukachevo, Soviet Union
- Died: June 21, 1993 (aged 25); Uzhhorod, Ukraine
- Education: Art studio of Zoltán Bakonyi in Uzhhorod, Uzhhorod College of Applied Art, Lviv State Institute of Applied and Decorative arts, Budapest College of Applied Arts
- Known for: painting, illustrator

István Molnár (January 27, 1968 – June 21, 1993) was a Hungarian-born Ukrainian and Soviet painter, illustrator and musician.

== Biography ==
István Molnár was born on January 27, 1968, in the town of Mukachevo, but lived all his life in the city of Uzhhorod. From an early age István was very good at drawing, and at the age of 14 he began his studies at Art College, which started his professional career. Teachers immediately took notice of his extraordinary personality and qualities of a leader and maximalist.

In 1986 István began actively participating in regional, national and international exhibitions, and with his like-minded friends he organized a sensational imaginative association which they called "Left Eye." Their exhibitions were a success and a great interest. This same group later organized a rock band, "St. Pauli Guys," that was the start of a full-fledged creative, carefree. Of 1988 he took a job in the theater as a graphic designer, and began drawing again.

In the works of István Molnár, 1988–1989 was probably the most productive period of his life. During this time he created more than two dozen works that experts and critics associate to the Light period. In autumn 1989, István went to study at the Lviv Art Academy and rose to a whole new level in his development. The city of Lviv was the artistic center of Western Ukraine and the cradle of national traditions. The centuries-old history of Galicia was associated with the Russian Empire, Poland and the Austro-Hungarian Empire, and in it many cultures were interwoven. At the Lviv Art Academy, István finally decided on the art direction to take, and it was expressionism. Still, the academy staff did not support Molnár in his choice and even complicated his life as they were able, but he was steadfast in his choice. He studied and practiced by drawing pictures in the style of European and world classics of the early twentieth century, often experimenting. He ended up falling in love with the outstanding work of Austrian expressionist Egon Schiele, engrossed once again, and this time for good. The creative association "Left Eye" was still developing. István and the others held exhibitions in Uzhhorod and Budapest, followed by collective exhibitions at the Lviv National Museum, Rzeszów, Budapest, Berlin, Chicago, Minneapolis, and Madison. In the US, two of István's works were exhibited: "Wolf-cub" (1990) and "Cats" (1991).

István did not part with his guitar even in the student dormitory. The music world of U2 walked beside him throughout his life and helped him reach new heights in creativity. The works of Egon Schiele influenced him on the deepest level and in 1992 a series of works were created, which Molnár's contemporaries have yet to fully appreciate.

It is important to remember that István was an exchange student. During his studies at the Academy of Arts in Budapest one of the teachers encouraged his students to "learn drawing from this guy." Many students took advantage of opportunity to stay in Budapest.

In the end, István decided to return to Lviv and 1993, the last year of his life, was marked by a new series of paintings: "Totem 1," "Totem 2," "Totem 3" and "Snail." A few days before his passing, he painted his "tree of pain and bitterness". István Molnár died on June 21, 1993, in Uzhhorod. The artistic heritage of István Molnár is disappointingly little. He drew no more than 60 paintings, which were sold to all corners of the world. But his exhibitions are still shown, from time to time there are publications, and TV programs about him have been aired. There is an interest in, and a need for his paintings.
