= 29th Chess Olympiad =

1990 chess tournament in Novi Sad, Yugoslavia

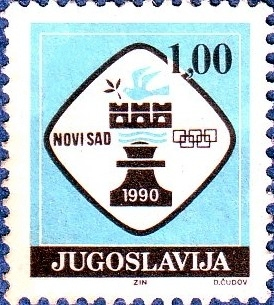
The official logo of the 29th Olympiad on a 1990 stamp of Yugoslavia.

The 29th Chess Olympiad (Serbian: 29. Шаховска олимпијада, 29. Šahovska olimpijada), organized by FIDE and comprising an open and a women's tournament, as well as several other events designed to promote the game of chess, took place between November 16 and December 4, 1990, in Novi Sad, Yugoslavia (present-day Serbia).

This time around, the political controversy surrounded the Baltic states – Estonia, Latvia, and Lithuania – who had all recently declared their independence from the Soviet Union and wanted to send their own teams to the Olympiad. The Yugoslavian hosts, however, followed the decree from Moscow and refused to accept their entries. Despite a petition from several top players they weren't allowed to play. This meant that big names like Jaan Ehlvest, Lembit Oll, Alexei Shirov, and former world champion Mikhail Tal could not appear at the Olympiad.

Incidentally, this would also turn out to be the last Olympic appearances of the "old" Eastern Bloc countries: East Germany, Yugoslavia and the Soviet Union. The latter finished in style by winning their sixth consecutive gold medals and 18th overall, even without Garry Kasparov and Anatoly Karpov who were in the midst of their fifth and final world championship match. Instead, the last Soviet team was led by Ivanchuk and Gelfand – two of the co-signers of the pro-Baltic petition. They still won in style, well ahead of the United States and England.

== Open event ==
A total of 108 teams from 106 different nations played a 14-round Swiss system tournament. For the first time, the host nation got the right to field two additional teams. All three Yugoslavian sides finished in the top 30.

In the event of a draw, the tie-break was decided first by using the Buchholz system, then by match points.

Open event
#	Country	Players	Average rating	Points	Buchholz
1	Soviet Union	Ivanchuk, Gelfand, Beliavsky, Yusupov, Yudasin, Bareev	2645	39	
2	United States	Seirawan, Gulko, Christiansen, Benjamin, Fedorowicz, De Firmian	2599	35½	452.5
3	England	Short, Speelman, Nunn, Adams, Chandler, Hodgson	2604	35½	450.5

#	Country	Average rating	Points	Buchholz	MP
4	Czechoslovakia	2530	34½		
5	Yugoslavia	2576	33	460.0	
6	China	2521	33	444.0	
7	Cuba	2526	33	440.5	
8	Iceland	2451	32½	452.0	
9	West Germany	2549	32½	451.0	
10	India	2488	32½	449.0	
11	Sweden	2439	32½	441.5	
12	Netherlands	2561	32½	435.0	
13	Yugoslavia "B"	2534	32½	433.0	
14	Bulgaria	2514	32	451.5	
15	France	2493	32	433.0	
16	Israel	2533	32	431.0	
17	Hungary	2553	32	427.5	
18	Poland	2476	32	421.5	
19	Mexico	2463	32	414.5	
20	Colombia	2424	31½	429.5	
21	Philippines	2443	31½	427.0	
22	Peru	2381	31½	421.0	
23	Scotland	2381	31½	418.5	
24	Finland	2449	31½	416.5	
25	East Germany	2509	31	446.0	
26	Yugoslavia "C"	2506	31	441.0	
27	Chile	2456	31	436.5	
28	Indonesia	2416	31	425.0	
29	Argentina	2439	31	423.5	
30	Canada	2451	31	418.5	
31	Spain	2495	31	417.0	
32	Romania	2483	31	412.5	
33	Brazil	2471	30½	420.5	
34	Australia	2454	30½	415.0	
35	Italy	2409	30½	412.0	
36	Switzerland	2501	30	427.5	
37	Norway	2473	30	425.0	
38	Denmark	2498	30	424.0	
39	Austria	2465	30	417.5	
40	Albania	2386	30	417.0	
41	Egypt	2376	30	416.5	
42	Wales	2301	30	391.5	
43	New Zealand	2295	29½		
44	Vietnam	2201	29	405.5	17
45	Mongolia	2349	29	405.5	14
46	Singapore	2370	29	396.0	
47	Turkey	2346	29	394.5	
48	Ecuador	2240	29	376.0	
49	Greece	2450	28½	427.5	
50	Paraguay	2343	28½	405.0	
51	Bangladesh	2363	28½	403.5	
52	Tunisia	2329	28½	403.0	
53	Belgium	2369	28½	396.5	
54	Costa Rica	2276	28½	392.0	
55	Portugal	2411	28	439.0	
56	Pakistan	2295	28	397.5	
57	Uruguay	2295	28	395.5	
58	Iran	2256	28	392.0	
59	Ireland	2306	28	391.0	
60	Luxembourg	2249	28	387.5	
61	Thailand	2230	28	377.5	
62	Angola	2324	28	377.0	
63	Syria	2291	27½	395.0	
64	Bolivia	2230	27½	378.5	
65	Barbados	2235	27½	372.0	
66	Japan	2226	27½	369.0	
67	United Arab Emirates	2216	27	383.0	
68	Yemen	2200	27	369.5	
69	Morocco	2259	26	390.0	
70	Algeria	2218	26	384.5	
71	Puerto Rico	2244	26	380.5	
72	Lebanon	2241	26	366.5	
73	Malaysia	2228	26	362.5	
74	Trinidad and Tobago	2200	26	361.5	
75	Guatemala	2230	26	337.0	
76	Venezuela	2285	25½	386.0	
77	Dominican Republic	2235	25½	378.5	
78	Uganda	2296	25½	361.5	
79	Faroe Islands	2240	25	381.0	
80	El Salvador	2268	25	374.5	
81	Nigeria	2203	25	366.5	
82	Cyprus	2206	25	346.5	
83	Hong Kong	2240	24½	364.0	
84	Jamaica	2218	24½	351.5	
85	Andorra	2213	24½	350.0	
86	Libya	2201	24½	345.5	
87	Guernsey and Jersey	2218	24	362.5	11
88	Zimbabwe	2209	24	362.5	6
89	Qatar	2229	24	362.0	
90	Zambia	2209	24	349.0	
91	Netherlands Antilles	2246	24	345.0	
92	Mali	2203	24	341.0	
93	Sudan	2201	23½	358.5	
94	Bahrain	2200	23½	347.5	
95	Malta	2210	23½	343.0	
96	Haiti	2204	23	357.5	
97	Fiji	2200	23	326.0	
98	San Marino	2200	22	326.5	
99	British Virgin Islands	2200	22	326.0	
100	Panama	2200	22	323.5	
101	United States Virgin Islands	2226	22	317.0	
102	Liechtenstein	2200	22	315.5	
103	Honduras	2200	22	282.0	
104	Botswana	2200	21½	323.5	
105	Bahamas	2201	21½	314.0	
106	Bermuda	2200	21		
107	Mauritius	2200	20		
108	Kenya	2201	18		

=== Individual medals ===
- Performance rating: (West Germany) Robert Hübner 2734
- Board 1: (Paraguay) Zenón Franco Ocampos (9/12) and (Andorra) Raül García Paolicchi (10½/14) = 75.0%
- Board 2: (India) Dibyendu Barua 8½ / 11 = 77.3%
- Board 3: (Austria) Egon Brestian 9½ / 12 = 79.2%
- Board 4: (Mexico) Roberto Martín del Campo 7½ / 10 = 75.0%
- 1st reserve: (Syria) Satea Husari 6 / 7 = 85.7%
- 2nd reserve: (Wales) Iolo Jones 6 / 7 = 85.7%

== Women's event ==
65 teams from 63 different nations took part. Like the open event, the women's competition featured three Yugoslavian teams, all of which finished in the top 20. Lebanon were signed up, but didn't show up. Their first three matches were listed as forfeit, after which they were officially withdrawn.

In the event of a draw, the tie-break was decided first by using the Buchholz system, then by match points.

For the second Olympiad in a row, the Hungarian team beat the Soviet Union, although only on tie break this time. Once again, all three Polgár sisters (Zsuzsa, Zsófia, and Judit) were in the team - and they all won their respective boards. The best individual performance, however, came from Soviet reserve Arakhamia who registered a perfect 12/12 score and an unbelievable 2935 performance rating.

#	Country	Players	Average rating	Points	Buchholz
1	Hungary	Zsuzsa Polgár, J. Polgár, Zsófia Polgár, Mádl	2492	35	344.5
2	Soviet Union	Chiburdanidze, Gaprindashvili, Galliamova, Arakhamia	2438	35	340.5
3	China	Xie Jun, Peng Zhaoqin, Qin Kanying, Wang Lei	2302	29	

#	Country	Average rating	Points	Buchholz	MP
4	Bulgaria	2258	26		
5	Yugoslavia	2312	25		
6	United States	2357	24½		
7	England	2235	24	351.5	
8	Greece	2242	24	337.0	
9	Romania	2275	24	334.0	
10	Yugoslavia "B"	2260	23½	342.5	
11	East Germany	2248	23½	328.0	
12	Netherlands	2157	23½	303.5	
13	Mongolia	2112	23½	293.5	
14	Poland	2257	23	347.0	
15	Argentina	2187	23	332.0	
16	Cuba	2173	23	329.5	
17	West Germany	2225	23	319.5	
18	Israel	2132	23	308.5	
19	Czechoslovakia	2250	22½	345.5	
20	Yugoslavia "C"	2173	22½	329.5	
21	Vietnam	2000	22½	322.0	
22	Denmark	2120	22	310.0	
23	Norway	2032	22	302.0	
24	France	2090	22	296.0	
25	Scotland	2012	22	295.0	
26	Brazil	2102	22	292.0	
27	Spain	2198	21½	319.5	
28	Switzerland	2133	21½	310.5	
29	Austria	2073	21½	299.5	
30	Sweden	2022	21½	298.0	
31	Australia	2073	21½	295.5	
32	India	2150	21	312.0	
33	Finland	2040	21	305.0	
34	Bangladesh	2063	21	252.0	
35	Albania	2000	20½	312.0	
36	Italy	2055	20½	289.0	
37	Indonesia	2042	20½	286.0	
38	Ireland	2047	20½	275.5	
39	Wales	2005	20	297.0	
=40	Mexico	2000	20	278.5	13
=40	New Zealand	2000	20	278.5	13
42	Belgium	2032	20	276.5	
43	Ecuador	2000	20	269.5	
44	Syria	2000	20	264.0	
45	Egypt	2007	20	262.0	
46	Turkey	2050	19½	288.0	
47	Dominican Republic	2048	19½	275.0	
48	Portugal	2003	19½	274.5	
49	Malaysia	2002	19½	262.5	
50	Zambia	2000	19½	221.5	
51	Bolivia	2000	19	282.5	
52	Uruguay	2003	19	270.5	
53	Puerto Rico	2000	19	227.0	
54	Canada	2063	18½	286.0	
55	Venezuela	2000	18½	277.0	
56	United Arab Emirates	2003	18		
57	Algeria	2000	17½	261.5	
58	Jamaica	2005	17½	236.5	
59	Zimbabwe	2000	17½	223.0	
60	Angola	2000	15½	219.0	
61	Netherlands Antilles	2000	15½	201.0	
62	Nigeria	2000	15		
63	Malta	2000	14½		
64	Botswana	2000	11½		
65	United States Virgin Islands	2000	10		

=== Individual medals ===
- Performance rating: (Soviet Union) Ketevan Arakhamia 2935
- Board 1: (Hungary) Zsuzsa Polgár 11½ / 14 = 82.1%
- Board 2: (Hungary) Judit Polgár 10 / 13 = 76.9%
- Board 3: (Hungary) Zsófia Polgár 11½ / 13 = 88.5%
- Reserve: (Soviet Union) Ketevan Arakhamia 12 / 12 = 100.0%
