= István Molnár (chess player) =

Hungarian chess player

Personal information
- Born: 10 February 1933
- Died: 29 July 2015 (aged 82)

Chess career
- Country: Hungary

István Molnár (10 February 1933 – 29 July 2015) was a Hungarian chess player.

== Biography ==
In the early 1950s, István Molnár was one of the best young Hungarian chess players. In 1950, in Budapest he received his best result in Hungarian Chess Championship where he shared the 5th–7th place.

István Molnár played for Hungary in the Chess Olympiad:

- In 1952, at second reserve board in the 10th Chess Olympiad in Helsinki (+1, =0, -2).

István Molnár played for Hungary in the World Student Team Chess Championships:

- In 1955, at first board in the 2nd World Student Team Chess Championship in Lyon (+2, =3, -4) and won team bronze medal,
- In 1957, at second reserve board in the 4th World Student Team Chess Championship in Reykjavík (+5, =1, -1),
- In 1958, at first reserve board in the 5th World Student Team Chess Championship in Varna (+2, =2, -1).

After the 1950s, he rarely participated in chess tournaments.
