= Maria Anzbach =

- Municipality
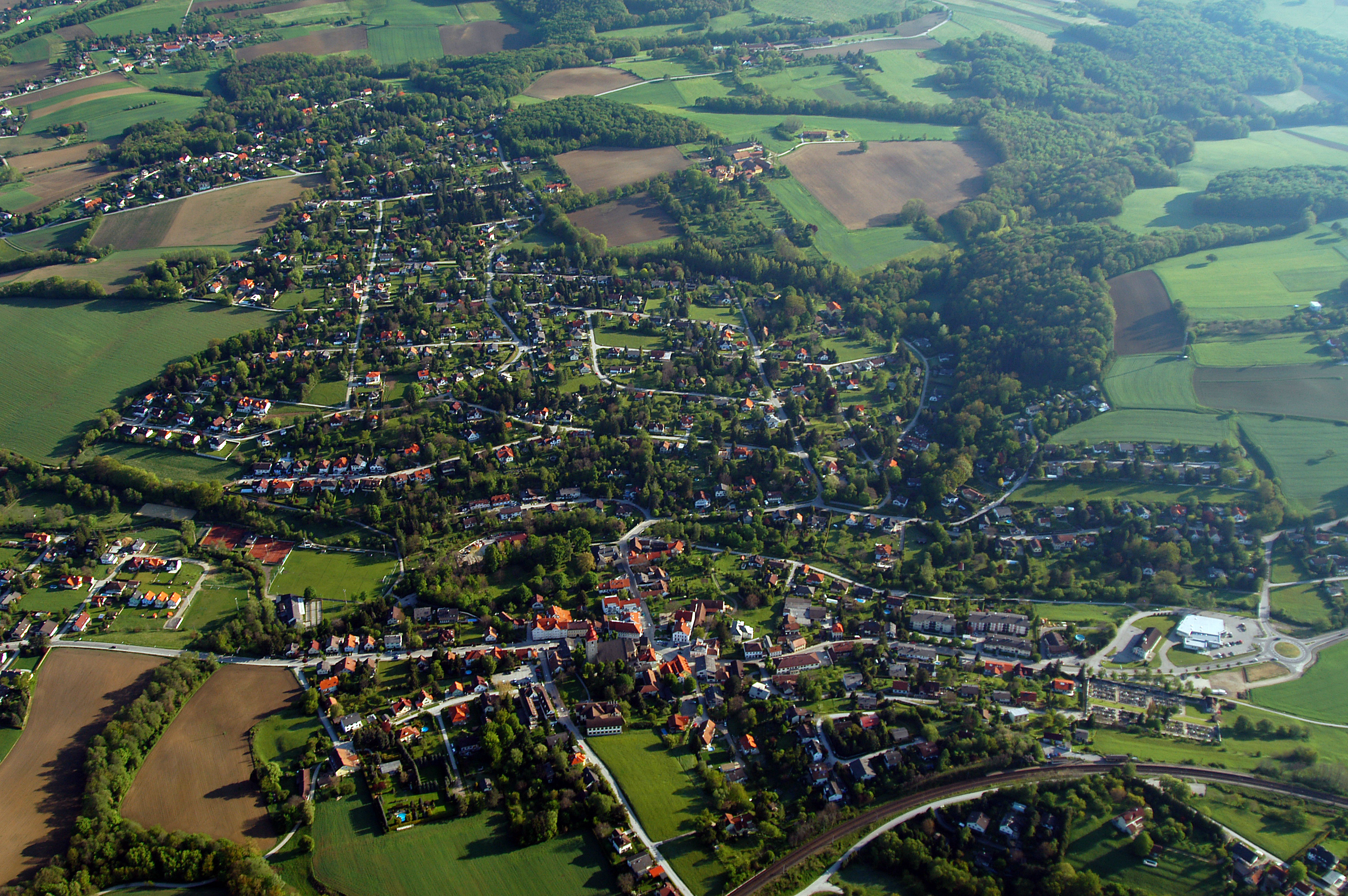

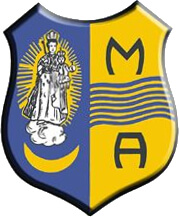
- Coat of arms

- Location within Austria
- Coordinates: 48°11′N 15°56′E
- Country: Austria
- State: Lower Austria
- District: Sankt Pölten-Land

Government
  - Mayor: Karin Winter

Area
  - Total: 18.21 km^{2} (7.03 sq mi)
- Elevation: 245 m (804 ft)

Population (2018-01-01)
  - Total: 3,055
  - Density: 167.8/km^{2} (434.5/sq mi)
- Time zone: UTC+1 (CET)
  - Summer (DST): UTC+2 (CEST)
- Postal code: 3034
- Area code: 02772
- Website: http://www.maria-anzbach.at

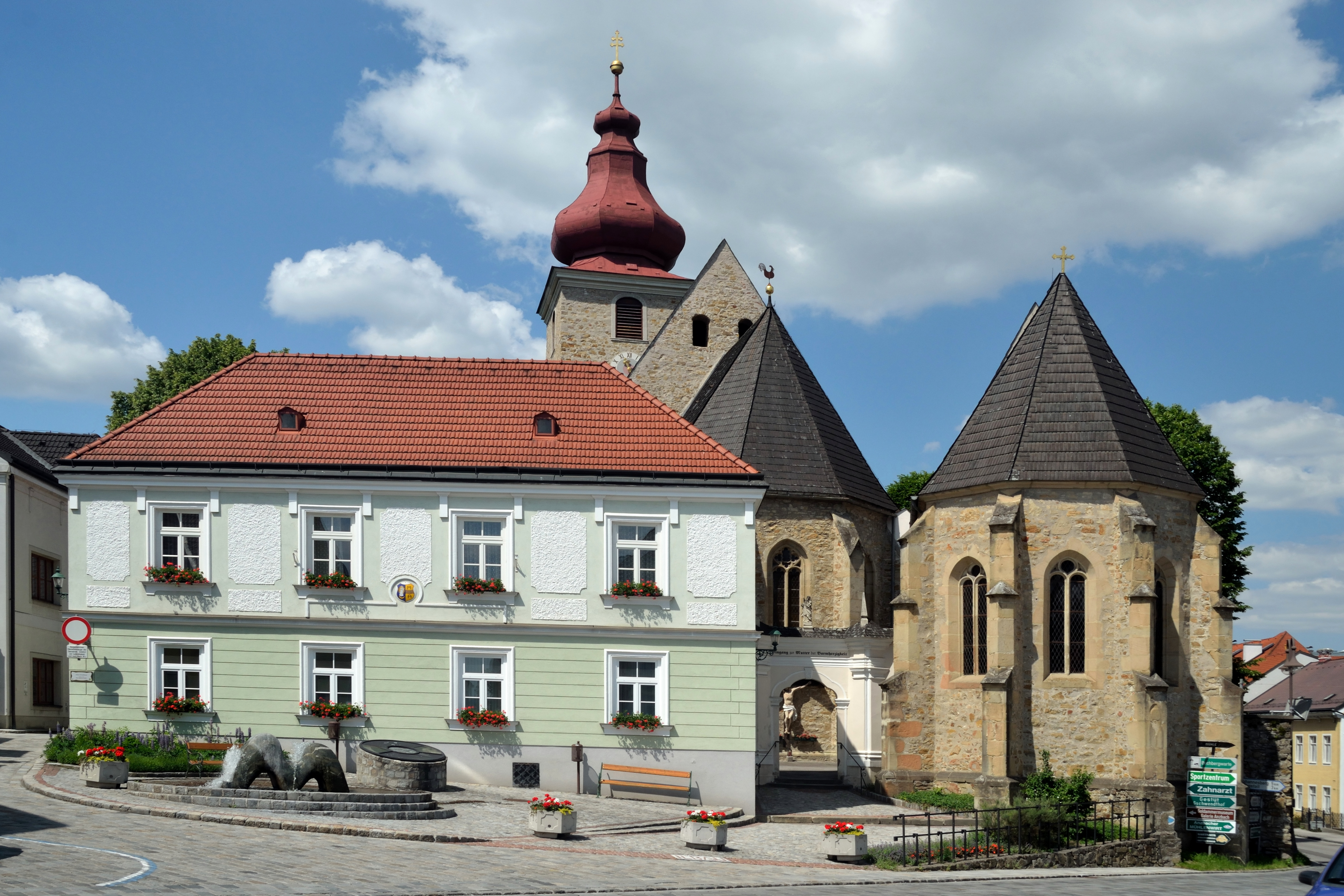
Town square of Maria Anzbach

Maria Anzbach is a town in the district of Sankt Pölten-Land in the Austrian state of Lower Austria.

== Population ==
Historical population
Year	Pop.	±%
1971	1,808	—
1981	2,151	+19.0%
1991	2,562	+19.1%
2001	2,621	+2.3%
2023	3,290	+25.5%

== Transport ==
Maria Anzbach is located on the Westbahn, on which RE51 passes from Wien Westbahnhof to Sankt Poelten and the S50 from Wien Westbahnhof to Neulengbach.

Maria Anzbach is located in the area of the transpprt association Verkehrsverbund Ost-Region (VOR).
