= Andrzej Pytlakowski =

Polish chess player

Personal information
- Born: 2 July 1919 Zamość, Poland
- Died: 15 November 2010 (aged 91) Warsaw, Poland

Chess career
- Country: Poland

Andrzej Pytlakowski (2 July 1919 – 15 November 2010) was a Polish chess player.

== Biography ==
Andrzej Pytlakowski graduated from elementary school in Lviv, in 1929-1937 he was a student Stefan Batory Gymnasium and Lyceum (Warsaw, Poland). From 1937 he studied at the Faculty of Mechanical Engineering of the Warsaw University of Technology, in the 1938/1939 academic year Pytlakowski belonged to the founder Bratnia Pomoc with leftist orientation. After the outbreak of World War II, he managed to get to Lviv, briefly studied at the Polytechnic there, then worked at the radio plant. In 1942 Pytlakowski returned to Warsaw and worked at the State Radio and Telecommunication Works. In 1943 he became a partisan Gwardia Ludowa and used the pseudonym "Adam". In August 1944 Pytlakowski got out of Warsaw, then worked as a teacher in the village of Polany.

At the beginning of 1945 Pytlakowski became Civil service officer of the Ministry of Public Security (Poland), he was the head of the section in Municipal Office of Public Security in Radom, then deputy head of Faculty IV of Department I Ministry of Public Security, he left the service at his own request in October 1945 as a captain. Pytlakowski continued his studies interrupted by the war, this time in Łódź. After graduating, in 1947 Pytlakowski joined the Polish People's Army, in the following years he worked as a chess journalist and in Institute of Mathematical Machines.

== Sports career ==
Pytlakowski made his first starts in chess tournaments before World War II, including starting in 1938 in the championships of the Warsaw Society of Chess Game Supporters. At the turn of 1943/1944 he won the underground championships in Warsaw (according to some sources he took the place I-III). In 1946 he became the runner-up of Łódź. In 1946–1956 he participated six times in the Polish Chess Championship finals. The greatest success Pytlakowski achieved in Polish Chess Championship in 1955 in Wrocław, where he finished third and won the bronze medal. In 1950 Pytlakowski won with the Łódź team Polish Team Chess Championship, he repeated this success in 1956 with the SZ PRL team, in 1954 Pytlakowski won silver medal in the Polish Team Chess Championship with the SZ PRL team.

After the communist authorities liquidated sports associations, including the Polish Chess Federation, in 1951 Pytlakowski became vice president of the Chess Section Main Committee of Physical Culture for training.

He has competed in international chess tournaments several times, achieving valuable victories in single games, including in 1947 in Warsaw (in this tournament he defeated, among others, Bogdan Śliwa), 1950 in Szczawno-Zdrój (victories with Paul Keres, in the tournament, however, he took XV-XVI place for twenty participants), 1951 in Mariánské Lázně (won against Pal Benko) and 1952 in Międzyzdroje. In 1952 he represented Poland at 10th Chess Olympiad. Political conditions meant that Pytlakowski was chosen to play on the 2nd chessboard (well above his real strength of the game), and as a consequence his performance was unsuccessful (he scored ½ points in 7 games). In 1955 he appeared in Łódź in a match against USSR, in which he scored 1 point in 2 games (he defeated Semyon Furman). In the years 1951–1957 he won the title of Champion of the Polish Armed Forces five times, in Legia Warsaw he was also the Polish Chess Team champion in 1961, 1963, 1964 and 1972, runner-up in 1968, bronze medalist in 1966.

Pytlakowski also worked in chess journalism. He was, among others, a long-time collaborator of the monthly Szachy, he ran chess corners in Żołnierzu Wolności and weekly Świat.

Andrzej Pytlakowski was also a mountaineer and participant in many expeditions in Himalayas and Hindu Kush, he practiced climbing for over 50 years. For his achievements he was awarded the Honorary Membership of the Capital Tatra Club at the Żoliborski Branch of PTTK in Warsaw.

He was buried in Powązki Cemetery in Warsaw.
