= Dennis Morton Horne =

English chess player

Personal information
- Born: 19 October 1920 Surrey, England
- Died: 3 May 2015 (aged 94) Kent, England

Chess career
- Country: England

Dennis Morton Horne (19 October 1920 – 3 May 2015) was an English chess player. Chess Olympiad individual silver medal winner (1952).

== Biography ==
After World War II, Dennis Morton Horne retired from the army as a captain and studied at University of Oxford, where he became seriously obsessed with chess. In the 1948 Plymouth International Chess Tournament, he beat the former World chess champion Max Euwe. In 1949 he won the 2nd place in Swiss-system British Chess Championship. He was a sharp-style chess player, often using such chess opening as King's Gambit. Dennis Morton Horne represented the English team in Chess Olympiad in 1952, where he won an individual silver medal. In 1954, he still took part in the Hastings International Chess Congress, which, although surpassing Friðrik Ólafsson, still ranks last. In later years, the less time Dennis Morton Horne spent on chess, the more he became obsessed with Contract bridge.
