= Marianne Kinzel =

Marianne Kinzel was a mid-20th century designer of knitted lace patterns. She was born and raised in Bohemia, attending the Art and Needlework College in Prague, but later emigrated with her husband Walter to England.

When she started designing patterns, she had some difficulty finding a publisher, so she and her husband formed their own publishing company, Artistic Needleworks Publications, through which she published both individual patterns and later entire pattern books.

== Bibliography ==
- Marianne Kinzel (1954). First book of modern lace knitting. Artistic Needleworks Publications. (out of print)
  - 1960 republication: London: Mills & Boon, Ltd. (out of print)
  - 1972 republication: New York: Dover Publications, Inc. ISBN 0-486-22904-1.
- Marianne Kinzel (1961). Second book of modern lace knitting. London: Mills & Boon, Ltd. (out of print)
  - 1972 republication: New York: Dover Publications, Inc. ISBN 0-486-22905-X.
