= Hans Keller (chess player) =

Austrian chess player

Personal information
- Born: unknown
- Died: unknown

Chess career
- Country: Austria

Hans Keller (unknown — unknown) was an Austrian chess player.

== Biography ==
From the early 1940s to the early 1950s, Hans Keller was one of Austria's leading chess players. He won Vienna city chess championship. He participated in the international chess tournaments: Leopold Trebitsch Memorial Tournament (Vienna 1936), Vienna (1939), Carl Schlechter Memorial Tournament (Vienna 1947), Reggio Emilia (1951).

Hans Keller played for Austria in the Chess Olympiad:

- In 1952, at second reserve board in the 10th Chess Olympiad in Helsinki (+2, =2, -3).
