= Eduard Dyckhoff =

German doctor of law and chess player

Personal information
- Born: 14 November 1880 Augsburg, German Empire
- Died: March 2, 1949 (aged 68) Bad Tölz, West Germany
- Occupation(s): Doctor of Law, chess player

Chess career
- Country: Germany

Eduard Dyckhoff (November 14, 1880 in Augsburg, Germany – March 2, 1949) was a German doctor of law and chess player. He won the Bavarian Chess Championship in 1913 and again in 1942, and is often considered an important figure in the development of correspondence chess in the early 20th century. Dyckhoff was born in Augsburg and died in Bad Tölz.
