= Austrian Chess Federation =

Austrian sports governing body

The Austrian Chess Federation (German: Österreichischer Schachbund - ÖSB) is the national organisation for chess in Austria. It is based in Graz.

The federation has 15,000 members and since 1981 publishes a chess magazine called Schach Aktiv. The federation organizes the Austrian Chess Championship.

== History ==
It was founded in 1920 with Josef Krejcik as president, but ceased to exist following the annexation of Austria by Nazi Germany. It was refounded in 1946, with Josef Hanacik as president. He was succeeded in 1952 by Franz Cejka, and after his death in 1971 by Kurt Jungwirth, a co-founder and president of the European Chess Union. Jungwirth served until 2017; he was succeeded by Christian Hursky, an Austrian politician and member of the Vienna Landtag.

== Organisation ==
- President: Christof Tschohl
- Vice president: Friedrich Knapp
