= Clare Benedict Cup =

European chess tournament (1953-1979)

- Sport: Chess
- Founded: 1953
- Founder: Clare Benedict
- Folded: 1979
- No. of teams: 7
- Last champion: England
- Most titles: West Germany (12 titles)

The Clare Benedict Cup was a chess tournament for national teams from Europe that took place 23 times between 1953 and 1979. It was founded by Clare Benedict, who wanted to organise an international championship after moving to Europe. It was held in Switzerland while Benedict was still alive, but was later also hosted by Germany, England, Spain, Austria, and Denmark.

== Overview and History ==
=== Foundation ===
Clare Benedict (1871–1961), author and patron, was originally from Cleveland, Ohio, but moved to Switzerland in 1945, where she founded the tournament. She was a distant relative of author James Fenimore Cooper.

Benedict spent her twilight years on Lake Lucerne and met Max Euwe, who helped Clare in finding Alois Nagler (a Swiss chess player) and the Chess Society of Zurich, who appreciated her vision of a peaceful nations tournament in an exalted and sophisticated atmosphere.

=== Tournament Style ===
The Clare Benedict Cup was organized as a round-robin tournament, where everyone plays against each other. Each team was made up of four players plus a substitute. They played using only five boards at the first tournament in 1952. In the original rules it stated that six teams participated. However, in recent years this has increased to up to eight teams. The teams were first evaluated by game points.

In 1954 in Zurich, they changed the tournament style from the teams playing against each other to a single player tournament consisting of 12 players. The German Grandmaster Lothar Schmid took first place followed by Erwin Nievergelt from Switzerland and finally ex-champion Max Euwe.

== Participating Countries ==
Country	Participations	Wins	Hosts
Belgium	2	0	0
Denmark	4	1	1
Germany	21	12	2
England	18	2	2
France	2	0	0
Italy	10	0	0
Netherlands	21	5	0
Norway	1	0	0
Austria	23	1	1
Scotland	1	0	0
Sweden	2	0	0
Switzerland	23	1	15
Spain	17	1	2

== Results ==
#	Sezon	Miejsce	1st Place	2nd Place	3rd Place	Source
1	1953	Mont Pèlerin, Switzerland	Netherlands	Austria	Switzerland	
2	1955	Mont Pèlerin, Switzerland	Netherlands	Switzerland	Austria	
3	1956	Lenzerheide, Switzerland	Germany	Netherlands	Italy	
4	1957	Bern, Switzerland	Germany	Netherlands	Austria	
5	1958	Neuchâtel, Switzerland	Switzerland	Spain	Germany	
6	1959	Lugano, Switzerland	Germany	Spain	Austria	
7	1960	Biel, Switzerland	Germany	England	Switzerland	
8	1961	Neuhausen, Switzerland	Austria	Germany	England	
9	1962	Bern, Switzerland	Germany	Spain	England	
10	1963	Luzern, Switzerland	Germany	Netherlands	England	
11	1964	Lenzerheide, Switzerland	Germany	Netherlands	Austria	
12	1965	Berlin, Germany	Germany	Spain	Netherlands	
13	1966	Brunnen, Switzerland	Netherlands	Spain	Germany	
14	1967	Leysin, Switzerland	Germany	Spain	England	
15	1968	Bad Aibling, Germany	Germany	Netherlands	England	
16	1969	Adelboden, Switzerland	Netherlands	Switzerland	Germany; England; Spain	
17	1970	Paignton, England	Spain	England	Germany	
18	1971	Madrid, Spain	Netherlands	England	Spain	
19	1972	Wien, Austria	Germany	Netherlands	Spain	
20	1973	Gstaad, Switzerland	Germany	England	Denmark	
21	1974	Cala Galdana, Spain	England	Germany	Switzerland	
22	1977	Copenhagen, Denmark	Denmark	England	Sweden	
23	1979	Cleveland, England	England	Germany	Netherlands	
