= Miron Sher =

Soviet-American chess grandmaster (1952–2020)

Personal information
- Born: Miron Naumovich Sher; June 29, 1952 Chernivtsi, Ukrainian SSR, USSR
- Died: August 20, 2020 (aged 68) New York City, New York, U.S.

Chess career
- Country: Soviet Union → Russia (before 1997); United States (after 1997)
- Title: Grandmaster (1992), International Correspondence Chess Master (1987)
- Peak rating: 2535 (July 1993)

Miron Naumovich Sher (Russian: Мирон Наумович Шер; June 29, 1952 – August 20, 2020) was a Soviet-born American chess player, who was awarded the title of Grandmaster (GM) by FIDE in 1992. Towards the end of the Soviet era, he began winning the open sections at international tournaments. In 1991, when the Soviet Union dissolved, Sher became a Russian citizen. In 1997, Sher, his wife, Woman Grandmaster (WGM) Alla Grinfeld (ru), and their son, Mikhail, who then was 14, emigrated to America and settled in Brooklyn. Sher went on to become a distinguished scholastic chess coach and clinician in New York and was instrumental in developing several internationally strong players, notably Fabiano Caruana, many times number two in the world, and Robert Hess, who at age 15, while attending Stuyvesant High School, became an international master and at 16, a grandmaster. Before immigrating, Sher had also coached a number of students around Europe, including Peter Heine Nielsen.

== Career ==
Sher was born in Chernivtsi, Ukraine, and completed his bachelor's degree at Chernivtsi University. He went on to grad school at the State Central Order of Lenin Institute of Physical Education in Moscow; and, in 1975, in addition to his academics, Sher met the norms and was awarded the national title and rank Master of Sports of the USSR in Chess (ru) – one of twenty-five nationwide to earn the distinction that year (not to be confused with an academic master's degree in sports). (Note: Holders of the title "Master of Chess" are often referred to as "Soviet Chess Masters." In slang, a province (or what then was a province) is optionally added, such as "Soviet Ukrainian Chess Master" or in the post-Soviet era, simply the country such as "Russian Chess Master." It is a national rank and title. The Master of Chess designation was established nationally for men in 1934 – and for women in 1950. From 1934 through 1987, the USSR conferred 1,061 Master of Sport in Chess titles – 904 to men and 157 to women. Not to be confused with an academic degree, the Master of Chess program at Sher's alma mater was founded in 1966 as a chess specialization program under the direction of Grigory Abramovich Goldberg (ru). In 1974, the specialization program was upgraded to the Chess Department – the first chess grad school program in history. (Dvoretsky, 2012, p. 51)) Sher's wife, WGM Alla Grinfeld (see Family section below) won the title, Master of Sports of the USSR in Chess, a year earlier. She was one of three women, nationwide, to win the distinction in 1974. Over the prior nineteen years – from 1950, when the distinction was first conferred upon women, through 1973 – only 56 women had won the title.

Sher's tournament successes include a shared 1^{st} place at the 1981 USSR Armed Forces Championship (ru) for chess in Mykolaiv and a shared 3^{rd} place at the semifinals of the Soviet Championship that same year. In that tournament, Arkady Novopashin (1932–2014) (ru) was 2^{nd} and WGM Maia Chiburdanidze, age 20 at the time, tied GM Vladimir Tukmakov for 1^{st}.

GM Adrian Mikhalchishin, also from Ukraine who had known Sher since childhood, stated that Sher had been a student of Anatoly Gurevich and that he never got to play on the Ukrainian youth team despite his talent because he was competing for spots with future GMs Alexander Beliavsky, Oleg Romanishin, and others.

In 1981, Sher became a chess coach for the Russian national team, a role he held until 1985. According to Mikhalchishin, "Miron was known for his great opening knowledge, which helped him to become great trainer."

In 1986, at the Belavenets Memorial, held annually in Smolensk since 1984 in honor of Sergey Belavenets, Sher shared 1^{st} in a four-way tie with Alexander Baburin (born 1967), Anatoly Donchenko (de) (born 1940), and Viktor Kuporosov (born 1961), each with 8-1/2 points.

Beginning 1987, when the USSR began relaxing international travel restrictions for Soviet citizens, Sher began to achieve international success. That year, in Prague, Sher placed 2^{nd} in a three-way tie. In June 1988, at Novi Sad, Serbia, Sher placed in a seven-way tie for 3^{rd} with Arshak Petrosian, Semen Dvoirys, Vladimir Petrienko, Nikolay Legky, and Rajko Miranovic; behind Vereslav Eingorn and Ashot Anastasian (tied for 2^{nd}), and Vladimir Bagirov (1^{st}). In 1989, at Eforie Nord, Romania, he placed 2^{nd} in a five-way tie. In 1989, he won outright an international tournament at Balatonberény. In June 1989, Sher placed third, behind GMs Evgeni Vasiukov and Gennadij Timoscenko in Budapest at the XIV Elekes Dezső Nemzetközi Sakk Emlékversenyt (14^{th} Dezső Elekes International Chess Memorial Competition), an annual event inaugurated in 1976 in honor of the statistician and chess player, Dezső Elekes (hu) (1889–1965). In 1990, in Belgorod, he shared 1^{st} with Evgeni Vasiukov (see game with Ratmir Kholmov at www.chessgames.com). In 1991, in Belgorod, Sher shared 1^{st} with Igor Novikov and Maxim Sorokin. In October 1993, he tied for 1^{st} at the Farum Open with GMs Lars Bo Hansen (de), Raj Tischbierek, Henrik Danielsen, Ralf Åkesson, and Nick de Firmian. In December 1994, as the winner of the 1993–1994 Hastings Challengers, he qualified for the 1994–1995 Premier tournament, where he tied 3^{rd} with Colin McNab, behind John Nunn (2^{nd}), and Thomas Luther (1^{st}).

Sher became an international master in 1988 and a grandmaster in 1992. Beginning 1990, after several visits to Scandinavia, Sher began coaching Peter Heine Nielsen in Copenhagen, which was 45 minutes by plane from Kaliningrad. Every three months, for four years, Sher traveled there to spend a week with Nielsen. According to Sher, they finished in 1994, after Nielsen became a grandmaster, but their relationship endured. In 2013, Nielsen joined the team of assistants who helped Magnus Carlsen prepare for the 2013 Candidates Tournament World Championship. Before that, Nielsen was on Viswanathan Anand's team. While working with Magnus, Nielsen turned to Sher for coaching advice. As of 2020, Nielsen is second in the world behind World Champion GM Magnus Carlsen.

In New York, Sher coached in several scholastic chess programs, including, for many years, the Dalton School, whose chess director, David MacEnulty, is portrayed in the 2005 film, Knights of the South Bronx. Other scholastic programs included IS 318, subject of the 2012 film, Brooklyn Castle, and Stuyvesant High School.

Sher coached GM Fabiano Caruana from age 8 to 12 – 2000 to 2004. According to a 2002 article in the Lincoln Journal Star, Caruana's weekly regimen – with no mention of school – consisted of roughly 28 hours training, 5 one-hour lessons with Sher, 4 hours playing on the Internet Chess Club site, 15 hours of tournament competition, and 4 hours of solving chess problems. Caruana, as a dual citizen of the U.S. and Italy, holds many distinctions in chess. Notably, at age 14, he became the youngest U.S. and Italian citizen to become a grandmaster. But before that, while Sher was coaching him, he became the youngest U.S. player to defeat a grandmaster. On September 30, 2002, at the Marshall Chess Club, Caruana, at age 10, defeated GM Aleksander Wojtkiewicz, who then was 39 and ranked eighth in the U.S.

In 2005, Caruana, with his family, moved to Madrid where he trained with Boris Zlotnik (ru) until 2015. Zlotnik had worked 16 years in the Chess Department of Sher's alma mater, the State Central Order of Lenin Institute of Physical Education. Grigory Goldberg (ru) (1908–1976) founding Director of the Chess Department had hired Zlotnik as a Senior Lecturer in 1975; and from 1985 to 1991, Zlotnik served as Director of the department. In 1992, Zlotnik emigrated to Spain and settled in The Pyrenees and Madrid and became a Spanish citizen.

Beginning around 1999, while living in New York, Sher began training Keaton Kiewra, a 12-year-old from Lincoln, Nebraska. Sher had been highly recommended by David MacEnulty and Bruce Pandolfini. Sher mentored Kiewra through high school, in chess camps and by phone – two hours a week. At age 23 – January 8, 2011 – Kiewra qualified as an international master at the Berkeley International, a tournament that marked a rare week for U.S. Chess, if ever, in which four Americans, Kiewra included, earned qualifying titles: Sam Shankland, 19, grandmaster; Daniel Naroditsky, 15, and Conrad Holt, 17, international masters. In that tournament, Kiewra defeated GM Robert Hess.

Sher also coached Darrian Robinson (born 1994), who, when the Chicago Tribune published an article about her in 2014, was the highest rated African American female chess player in the U.S. Chess Federation system.

In 2009, the World Chess Federation established a Trainers' Commission, who in turn established criteria for certified FIDE educator credentials: (i) FIDE Senior Trainer, (ii) FIDE Trainer, (iii) FIDE Instructor, (iv) National Instructor, and (v) Developmental Instructor. Sher, who was among several distinguished coaches who disapproved, commented, "I don't need this piece of paper from FIDE to be considered a good coach." Yet, Sher submitted an application because GM Yuri Razuvaev, a fellow Russian who was chairman of the commission, asked him to do so. Reflecting on the rationale of his decision, Sher stated, "if only not good coaches were on the list, it would not be good." Sher became a FIDE Senior Trainer.

== Family ==
Sher and his wife, Alla Berkovna Grinfeld (ru) (Russian: Алла Берковна Гринфельд), a Woman Grandmaster, met while Sher was studying in Voronezh, Russia. Alla is a distinguished scholastic chess educator in New York and worked closely with Miron in chess education. Alla was born in Spassk-Dalny, Primorsky Krai, Russia.

Sher had stated that the impetus for emigrating from Russia in 1997 was out of concern that his son, Mikhail, would be drafted in the Russian military. Mikhail, who began his U.S. education in the 9^{th} grade, has gone on to earn degrees at Carnegie Mellon (B.S. Mathematics/B.S. Economics, 2005), Columbia (M.S. Operations Research, 2006), and Drexel (Ph.D., 2015) and is now a scholar and educator in supply chain management.

=== Death ===
Sher died August 21, 2020, in New York City. He was buried August 23, 2020, at Mount Carmel Cemetery, Glendale. In an obituary for Sher published by the U.S. Chess Federation, GM Robert Hess stated that Sher had been his one and only coach.

== Selected videos of games and lectures ==
- Miron Sher vs. Viktor Bologan, 1993 via YouTube (re: Victor Bologan)
- John Nunn vs. Miron Sher, 1994 via YouTube
- Artur Kogan vs Miron Sher, 18^{th} Politiken Cup, Copenhagen, 1996 via YouTube (re: Artur Kogan)
- "What Does It Take to Be a Chess Master?" (Miron Sher at IS 318, Williamsburg, Brooklyn), Teen Kids News, October 30, 2018, via YouTube

== Extant published work ==
- Trends in the Czech and Schmid Benoni, Vol. 2 (pamphlet; 34 pages), by Miron Sher (Kaliningrad); London: Trends Publications, owned by IM Andrew David Martin (de) of Sandhurst (February 1996); OCLC 38019205, 770662474; ISBN 9781859320594

Part 1: Black played by Czech Benoni
Part 2: King's Indian Benoni
Part 3: Schmid Benoni and Modern Benoni

"I present you with the 100 most important games in these openings during the period 1992–95 inclusive."
Includes games by Topalov, Lautier, Miles, Yermolinsky, Kaidanov, Alterman, Rogers, Chernin, Timoscenko, Wells, Norwood, Krasenkov, Atalik, Naumkin (it), J. Horvath, Adianto, Braga, Baburin, Urban, Schneider, and Skembris (de).

- Dream Moves (paperback; 256 pages), by Miron Sher; Interchess BV/TA New in Chess; ISBN 978-9083382746

With forewords by GM Robert Hess, Mikhail Sher and Alla Grinfeld.
"Do you want to do the same chess homework that world-famous grandmasters Fabiano Caruana, Robert Hess and Peter Heine Nielsen did in their formative years as chess players? This book will test you with hundreds of positions created by their coach Miron Sher (1952–2020). Just like Fabiano, Robert and Peter, you are not supposed to stop after the first move. You have to find the last move of the solution!"

== See also ==
- List of nationality transfers in chess (re: Miron Sher)
- List of chess families

== Annotations, notes, and references ==
=== References ===
- Byrne, Robert (November 22, 1981). "How To Lose at Chess – And a War of Nerves". New York Times. Vol. 131, no. 45, 140. p. 10E.
- "Куда увел язык шахмат выпускников РГУФКСМиТ-ГЦОЛИФК: 6 историй к пятидесятилетию кафедры" [Where Did the International Language of Chess Take Them? Six Storys on the 50th Anniversary of the Program] (in Russian). Moscow: Russian State University of Physical Education, Sport, Youth and Tourism. n.d. Archived from the original on June 4, 2017.. Contributors:
  - Alexander N. Kostiev, PhD (Александр Н. Костиев), Russia (1970 alumnus)
  - Anvar Nazarov (Анвар Назаров), Tajikistan (1990 alumnus)
  - Ruslan Sergeevich Mironov (Руслан Сергеевич Миронов), Estonia (1993 alumnus)
  - Victor Antonovich Bologan (Виорел Антонович Бологан), Qatar (1993 alumnus)
  - Asya Son (Russian: Ася Сон), Singapore (1993 alumna)
  - Anastasia Sergeevna Savina (Анастасия Сергеевна Савина), France (2015 alumna)
- Debatin, Tobias; Hopp, Wilma; Vialle, Wilma; Ziegler, Albert (2015). "Why Experts Can Do What They Do: The Effects of Exogenous Resources on the Domain Impact Level of Activities (DILA)". Psychological Test and Assessment Modeling. 57 (1): 94–110. ISSN 2190-0507. OCLC 964111213 – via University of Wollongong. ProQuest 1670114001
- Di Felice, Gino (2017). Chess International Titleholders, 1950–2016. McFarland & Company. ISBN 9781476671321. LCCN 2017023280. OCLC 1020637239.
- Doggers, Peter (August 23, 2020). "GM Miron Sher, 1952–2020". Chess.com.
- Dvoretsky, Mark Izrailovich (2012). "Институт Физкультуры: Тренер-Почасовик" [Institute of Physical Culture: Hourly Trainer]. In Барский, Владимир Леонидович [in Russian] (ed.). Книга Для Друзей И Коллег [A Book for Friends and Colleagues]. Moscow: Андрей Ельков. p. 51. ISBN 9785990235250. OCLC 808348716 – via 64ab.ru. Note: the author states that the Chess Department founded in 1966 by Grigory Goldberg at the State Central Institute of Physical Culture of the Order of Lenin was (inferring from a translation) the first comprehensive academic chess program in higher education in the world. (publisher link – Андрей Ельков)
- Karpov, Anatoly Yevgenyevich, ed. (1990). "Шер Мирон Наумович" [Sher, Miron Naumovich] (PDF). Шахматы: Энциклопедический Словарь (Russian Chess Encyclopedia and Biographical Dictionary) (in Russian). Moscow: Great Soviet Encyclopedia. pp. 31 & 616–617. ISBN 5852700053. OCLC 606026618.
- Линовицкий, Евгений Павлович (1993). "КАФЕДРЕ ШАХМАТ – ДЕСЯТЬ ЛЕТ" [Chess Chair – Ten Years]. Труды Ученых ГЦОЛИФКа – 75 Лет: Ежегодник [Works of Scientist of the Russian State University of Physical Education, Sport, Youth and Tourism – 75th Anniversary: Yearbook] (digital online) (in Russian). Moscow. pp. 309–316. Note: Linovitsky, the author, was head of the Chess Department from 1990 to 2010.
- McClain, Dylan Loeb (March 18, 2007). "American Players Are on a Roll, Especially One 15-Year-Old". New York Times.
- McClain, Dylan Loeb (February 9, 2008). "FIDE Unveils New Titles to Mixed Reactions". New York Times. ProQuest 2222623844 (U.S. Newsstream database).
- McClain, Dylan Loeb (January 9, 2011). "America Has a New Chess Grandmaster and Three New International Masters". New York Times.
- Макарычевы, Марина; Макарычевы, Сергей (December 23, 2011). "Американские шахматные истории" [American Chess Stories]. Nezavisimaya Gazeta (in Russian). Moscow.
- O'Connor, Tom; Kiewra, Kenneth Anthony (October 21, 2002). "Chess Wunderkind, 10, Beats Grand Master". Lincoln Journal Star. p. 2D. ISSN 1084-5283. ProQuest 247989911.
- Reynolds, Jessica (July 20, 2014). "Remarkable Women – Darrian Robinson: Chess Is Only Part of the University of Chicago Student's Winning Approach to Life". Chicago Tribune. ISSN 1085-6706. ProQuest 1546082890. ProQuest 1546082890.
- Roeder, Oliver (November 8, 2018). "The American Grandmaster Who Could Become World Champion". FiveThirtyEight. Archived from the original on November 8, 2018.
- Root, Alexey (October 14, 2018). "Researching Chess Prodigies: An Interview with Dr. Kenneth Kiewra". ChessBase.
- "Персона Дня – Мирон Шер" [Person of the Day, June 29, 2020: Miron Sher] (in Russian). Moscow: Russian Chess Federation website. June 29, 2020.
- Shahade, Jennifer (August 26, 2006). "GM Ashley Gives Tips to Youth Champs". US Chess Federation.
- "Деятели Шахммат Спортсмены: Гринфельд Алла Берковна" [Chess Athlete Profiles: Grinfeld, Alla Berkovna] (in Russian). cпорт–cтрана.ру (sport-strana.ru). n.d.
- "Деятели Шахммат Спортсмены: Шер Мирон Наумович" [Chess Athlete Profiles: Sher, Miron Naumovich] (in Russian). cпорт–cтрана.ру (sport-strana.ru). n.d.
- "GM Miron Sher (1952–2020)". US Chess Federation. August 21, 2020.
