= Xtracon Chess Open =

Tournament in Copenhagen, Denmark

The Xtracon Chess Open (formerly the Politiken Cup) is an international chess tournament and the main feature event of the annual Copenhagen Chess Festival.

== History ==
Organized by the Copenhagen Chess Federation (KSU), it was originally set up to give Danish players the opportunity of international experience and title norms. Starting from modest means in 1979, with just 22 contestants, it has grown to become one of the world's largest and most respected open chess tournaments, with numbers of participants rising to 200 in 2003, and nowadays reaching well in excess of 400.

The tournament has attracted many of the world's strongest grandmasters as well as promising youngsters. Former world champion Vassily Smyslov was among the winners in 1980 and 1986, while other notable winners have included Viktor Korchnoi as clear first in 1996 at the age of 65 and Nigel Short in 2006. At the Politiken Cup in 2003, Magnus Carlsen achieved his third and final IM norm.

The early editions were held in Copenhagen and its suburbs, before moving to Helsingør. The tournament has always taken the format of a large "Open", accessible to both titled and non-titled players, except in 1983, when there was an invite-only, all-play-all Grandmaster event and a subsidiary Open tournament aimed at International Master level.

In later years the tournament has taken place during July/August, over 10 rounds, at the Konventum, a convention centre and resort set in the scenic surroundings of Helsingør.

From 1979 to 2015, the main sponsor was the Danish daily newspaper Politiken, but new arrangements have been announced for 2016–2018. The main sponsor is now Xtracon A/S, a Danish IT company with a chess playing owner. Accordingly, the tournament has been renamed to reflect the change, although it is anticipated that the format will remain broadly the same.

== List of winners ==
=== Politiken Cup (1979–2003) ===
The prize was split equally among all chess players who finished tied for first place.

#	Year	Winners	Points
1	1979	(Denmark) Carsten Høi	7½ (10)
2	1980	(Soviet Union) Vassily Smyslov (Soviet Union) Adrian Mikhalchishin	7½ (10)
3	1981	(Bulgaria) Petar Velikov (Sweden) Tom Wedberg (England) Shaun Taulbut	7½ (10)
4	1982	(Sweden) Tom Wedberg	7½ (10)
5	1983	(Hungary) István Csom (United States) Sergey Kudrin	5½ (9)
6	1984	(United States) Nick de Firmian (Poland) Aleksander Sznapik	7½ (10)
7	1985	(Czechoslovakia) Karel Mokry	7½ (10)
8	1986	(Soviet Union) Vassily Smyslov (Soviet Union) Alexander Chernin (Soviet Union) Evgeny Pigusov (Hungary) Laszlo Cserna	7 (10)
9	1987	(Denmark) Bjørn Brinck-Claussen	7½ (10)
10	1988	(Soviet Union) Rafael Vaganian	8 (10)
11	1989	(Sweden) Lars Karlsson (Poland) Aleksander Sznapik (Denmark) Jens Kristiansen	7½ (10)
12	1990	(Soviet Union) Konstantin Lerner	7½ (10)
13	1991	(Soviet Union) Yuri Dokhoian (Soviet Union) Yuri Piskov	8 (10)
14	1992	(Russia) Sergey Smagin (England) Matthew Sadler (England) John Emms (Israel) Avigdor Bykhovsky	7½ (10)
15	1993	(Germany) Igor Khenkin (England) John Emms (Denmark) Henrik Danielsen	7½ (10)
16	1994	(Ukraine) Valery Neverov (Ukraine) Michail Brodsky	7½ (10)
17	1995	(Denmark) Lars Bo Hansen	8 (10)
18	1996	(Switzerland) Viktor Korchnoi	8½ (11)
19	1997	(Iceland) Helgi Grétarsson (Denmark) Carsten Høi (Denmark) Erling Mortensen (Denmark) Lars Schandorff	8½ (11)
20	1998	(Iceland) Hannes Stefánsson (England) Daniel Gormally (Sweden) Tiger Hillarp Persson (Denmark) Lars Schandorff (Denmark) Nikolaj Borge	8½ (11)
21	1999	(Republic of Ireland) Alexander Baburin (Sweden) Tiger Hillarp Persson	8½ (11)
22	2000	(United States) Boris Gulko (Denmark) Lars Bo Hansen (Sweden) Jonny Hector	8½ (11)
23	2001	(Belgium) Mikhail Gurevich (Russia) Alexander Rustemov (Denmark) Peter Heine Nielsen (Israel) Lev Psakhis (United States) Nick de Firmian	8½ (11)
24	2002	(Netherlands) Sergei Tiviakov (Slovenia) Alexander Beliavsky (Argentina) Rubén Felgaer	8½ (11)
25	2003	(India) Krishnan Sasikiran	9 (11)

=== Politiken Cup (2004–2015) ===
All players finishing equal first are listed; the winners after tie-breaks are boldfaced.

#	Year	Winners	Points
26	2004	(Kazakhstan) **Darmen Sadvakasov** (Norway) Leif Johannessen (United States) Nick de Firmian	8 (10)
27	2005	(Russia) Konstantin Sakaev	8 (10)
28	2006	(Ukraine) **Vadim Malakhatko** (England) Nigel Short (Sweden) Jonny Hector	7½ (9)
29	2007	(Poland) **Michal Krasenkov** (Armenia) Gabriel Sargissian (Sweden) Emanuel Berg (United States) Nick de Firmian (Russia) Vladimir Malakhov	8 (10)
30	2008	(Netherlands) **Sergei Tiviakov** (Russia) Vladimir Malakhov (Russia) Boris Savchenko (Ukraine) Yuriy Kuzubov (Denmark) Peter Heine Nielsen (Sweden) Jonny Hector	8 (10)
31	2009	(India) **Parimarjan Negi** (Israel) Boris Avrukh	8½ (10)
32	2010	(Ukraine) Pavel Eljanov	8½ (10)
33	2011	(Russia) Igor Kurnosov	8½ (10)
34	2012	(Bulgaria) **Ivan Cheparinov** (Netherlands) Ivan Sokolov (Sweden) Jonny Hector	8 (10)
35	2013	(India) Parimarjan Negi	9 (10)
36	2014	(China) Bu Xiangzhi	9 (10)
37	2015	(Austria) **Markus Ragger** (Germany) Liviu-Dieter Nisipeanu (Germany) Vitaly Kunin (Norway) Jon Ludvig Hammer (France) Laurent Fressinet (France) Sébastien Mazé (Sweden) Tiger Hillarp Persson (United States) Sam Shankland (Romania) Mihail Marin (Denmark) Sune Berg Hansen	8 (10)

=== Xtracon Chess Open (2016–2019) ===
All players finishing equal first are listed; the winners after tie-breaks are boldfaced.

#	Year	Winners	Points
38	2016	(Germany) **Matthias Blübaum** (Germany) Jonathan Carlstedt (Latvia) Alexei Shirov (Egypt) Bassem Amin (Romania) Mihail Marin (Norway) Jon Ludvig Hammer (France) Jean-Marc Degraeve	8 (10)
39	2017	(Georgia (country)) Baadur Jobava	8½ (10)
40	2018	(Norway) **Jon Ludvig Hammer** (Russia) Dmitry Andreikin	8½ (10)
41	2019	(India) Rameshbabu Praggnanandhaa	8½ (10)
