= North Sea Cup (chess) =

Event in Esbjerg, Denmark (1976–2008)

The North Sea Cup was an open chess tournament played in Esbjerg, Denmark from 1976 to 2008. Until 2003 there was an amateur section (a Swiss system tournament) and a 10-player round-robin tournament for titled players. The exceptions are 1986 and 1987. In 1986 the titled section was the play-off for the Danish Chess Championship. In 1987 the titled section was replaced by the Danish Juniors' Championship. From 2004 the tournament has only one division, a nine- or ten-round Swiss system.

The North Sea Cup was not played in 2009.

== Winners ==
#	Year	Winner
1	1976	Ulrik Rath; Uwe Kunsztowicz
2	1977	Jens Kristiansen
3	1978	Bent Larsen
4	1979	László Vadász; Jonathan Mestel
5	1980	Artur Yusupov
6	1981	Lars Karlsson
7	1982	Ľubomír Ftáčnik
8	1983	Curt Hansen
9	1984	Nigel Short
10	1985	Andras Adorjan
11	1986	Carsten Hoi (match winner)
12	1987	Lars Bo Hansen (Danish Junior's Ch)
13	1988	Rafael Vaganian; Viktor Kupreichik
14	1996	John Emms
15	2000	Peter Svidler; Mikhail Gurevich
16	2001	Peter Heine Nielsen; Emil Sutovsky
17	2002	Lazaro Bruzon; Leinier Domínguez
18	2003	Alexey Dreev; Luke McShane; Krishnan Sasikiran
19	2004	Nikola Sedlak
20	2005	Vladimir Belov
21	2006	Stefan Đurić; Aloyzas Kveinys; Igor Rausis; Gerhard Schebler
22	2007	Karsten Rasmussen
23	2008	Vadim Malakhatko
