= Gert Iskov =

Danish chess player (born 1948)

Personal information
- Born: 28 July 1948 (age 77) Copenhagen, Denmark

Chess career
- Country: Denmark
- Title: International Master (1979)
- Peak rating: 2420 (May 1974)

Gert Iskov (born 28 July 1948) is a Danish chess International Master (IM) (1979), Danish Chess Championship winner (1975).

== Biography ==
From the begin of 1970s to the begin of 1980s Iskov was one of the leading Danish chess players. He participated many times in the finals of Danish Chess Championships and won gold medal in 1975. Gert Iskov was participant of a number of international chess tournaments, including the tournaments in Olot (1974), Dortmund (1976), as well as the Rilton Cup, North Sea Cups and the traditional Copenhagen Politiken Cup tournaments (her best result: shared 2nd-5th place in 1982). In 1975 he lost the match to Danish chess grandmaster Bent Larsen with 0,5:5,5.

Iskov played for Denmark in the Chess Olympiad:

- In 1974, at fourth board in the 21st Chess Olympiad in Nice (+4, =10, -1).

He played for Denmark in the European Team Chess Championship preliminaries:

- In 1977, at fifth board in the 6th European Team Chess Championship preliminaries (+0, =1, -2),
- In 1983, at fifth board in the 8th European Team Chess Championship preliminaries (+1, =1, -0).

Iskov played for Denmark in the Clare Benedict Cup:

- In 1974, at reserve board in the 21st Clare Benedict Chess Cup in Cala Galdana (+1, =3, -2).

He played for Denmark in the Nordic Chess Cups:

- In 1974, at third board in the 5th Nordic Chess Cup in Eckernförde (+1, =2, -2) and won team silver medal,
- In 1975, at first board in the 6th Nordic Chess Cup in Hindås (+2, =1, -2) and won team silver medal.

In 1979, Iskov was awarded the FIDE International Master (IM) title.
