= Egil Jacobsen =

Danish chess player

Egil Jacobsen (1897 – 27 March 1923) was a Danish chess master.

He tied for 5-6th at Horsens 1915 (the 6th Danish Chess Championship, Johannes Giersing won), tied for 9-10th at Copenhagen 1916 (the 9th Nordic Chess Championship, B-tournament, Karl Berndtsson won), and twice won Danish championships at Grenaa 1917 and Copenhagen 1922. He took 5th at Copenhagen 1923 (Aron Nimzowitsch won), and shared 2nd, behind Erik Andersen, at Copenhagen 1923 (DEN-ch).
