= Colvig =

Colvig is a surname. Notable people with the surname include:

- Pinto Colvig (1892–1967), American actor, animator, cartoonist, and circus and vaudeville performer
- Vance Colvig (1918–1991), American actor and writer, son of Pinto Colvig
- William Colvig (1917–2000), American electrician and amateur musician

== See also ==
- Colvig Gulch, Oregon, United States, a valley
- Bent Kølvig (born 1938), Danish chess player
