= Albert Ziegler =

German psychologist

Albert Ziegler (born 4 July 1961 in Siebeldingen) is a German psychologist and the Chair Professor of Educational Psychology and Research on Excellence at the Friedrich-Alexander-University Erlangen Nürnberg.

Ziegler is the Secretary-General of the International Research Association for Talent Development and Excellence (IRATDE); the Vice President of the European Council for High Ability (ECHA).; and Chairman of the European Talent Support Network (ETSN). As of August 2017, he serves as Director of the Sound Research Branch at the World Giftedness Center. He is also the Editor-in-Chief of ECHA's scholarly journal, High Ability Studies.

Ziegler's work is predominantly concerned with gifted education and talent development. To date, he has published over 400 articles, chapters, and books in the field of educational psychology.

== Biography ==
Ziegler received a Ph.D. in psychology from LMU Munich.

In 2001, Ziegler followed a professorship with the Department of Educational Psychology at the Goethe University Frankfurt with a position at the University of Ulm where he founded and led the Statewide Counseling and Research Center for the Gifted. By 2007, in cooperation with both the University of Ulm and the United Arab Emirates, he led an international team of experts in the development of a “national plan for the gifted.” The project was terminated prematurely due to internal difficulties.

In 2017, while at the University of Erlangen–Nuremberg, Ziegler revived the project and, together with the University of Regensburg, entered a relationship with the Hamdan Foundation for Distinguished Academic Performance concerning the development and joint establishment of a World Giftedness Center (WGC). The WGC will open its doors for the first time during the Expo 2020 in Dubai, and will commence operations in close collaboration with the United Nations Educational, Scientific, and Cultural Organization (UNESCO).

== Honors and awards ==
Ziegler was endowed visiting professorships at Columbia University in New York City; at the Chinese Academy of Sciences in Beijing, China; the University of Vienna in Vienna, Austria; and at the University of British Columbia in Vancouver, Canada. In 2017, he received an honorary professorship from the Pontifical Catholic University of Peru in Lima and an International Fellowship at the Chinese Academy of Sciences
