= Bjørn Nielsen =

Danish chess player

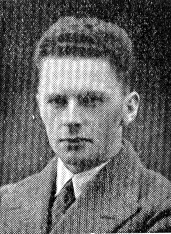
- Born: 4 October 1907
- Died: 21 May 1949 (aged 41)
- Citizenship: Denmark

Bjørn (Björn, Bjorn) Nielsen (4 October 1907 – 21 May 1949) was a Danish chess master.

He played for Denmark in Chess Olympiads:

- In 1933, at fourth board in 5th Olympiad in Folkestone (+4 –2 =7);
- In 1935, at second board in 6th Olympiad in Warsaw (+3 –5 =6);
- In 1936, at third board in 3rd unofficial Chess Olympiad in Munich (+10 –2 =3).

He won individual gold medal at Munich 1936.

In 1933, he tied for 6-7th in Copenhagen (Politiken, Aron Nimzowitsch won), In 1941, he tied for 5-6th in Munich (Europaturnier, Gösta Stoltz won).

He was Danish Champion in 1941, 1942, 1944, and 1946. In 1947 he shared 1st, but lost the play-off to Jens Enevoldsen, 0.5 point against 3.5 points. He also shared 1st in 1949 but died in Herning before the play-off against Poul Hage could take place.
