= ECHA (disambiguation) =

ECHA is the European Chemicals Agency, an agency of the European Union.

ECHA may also refer to:

- European Council for High Ability, an NGO of the Council of Europe concerned with giftedness
- Eastern Canada Hockey Association, formerly known as the Eastern Canada Amateur Hockey Association (ECAHA)
- Eastern Collegiate Hockey Association, US
- HADHA, an enzyme
- Edmonton Clinic Health Academy, a building at the University of Alberta
