= Davor Palo =

Danish chess player

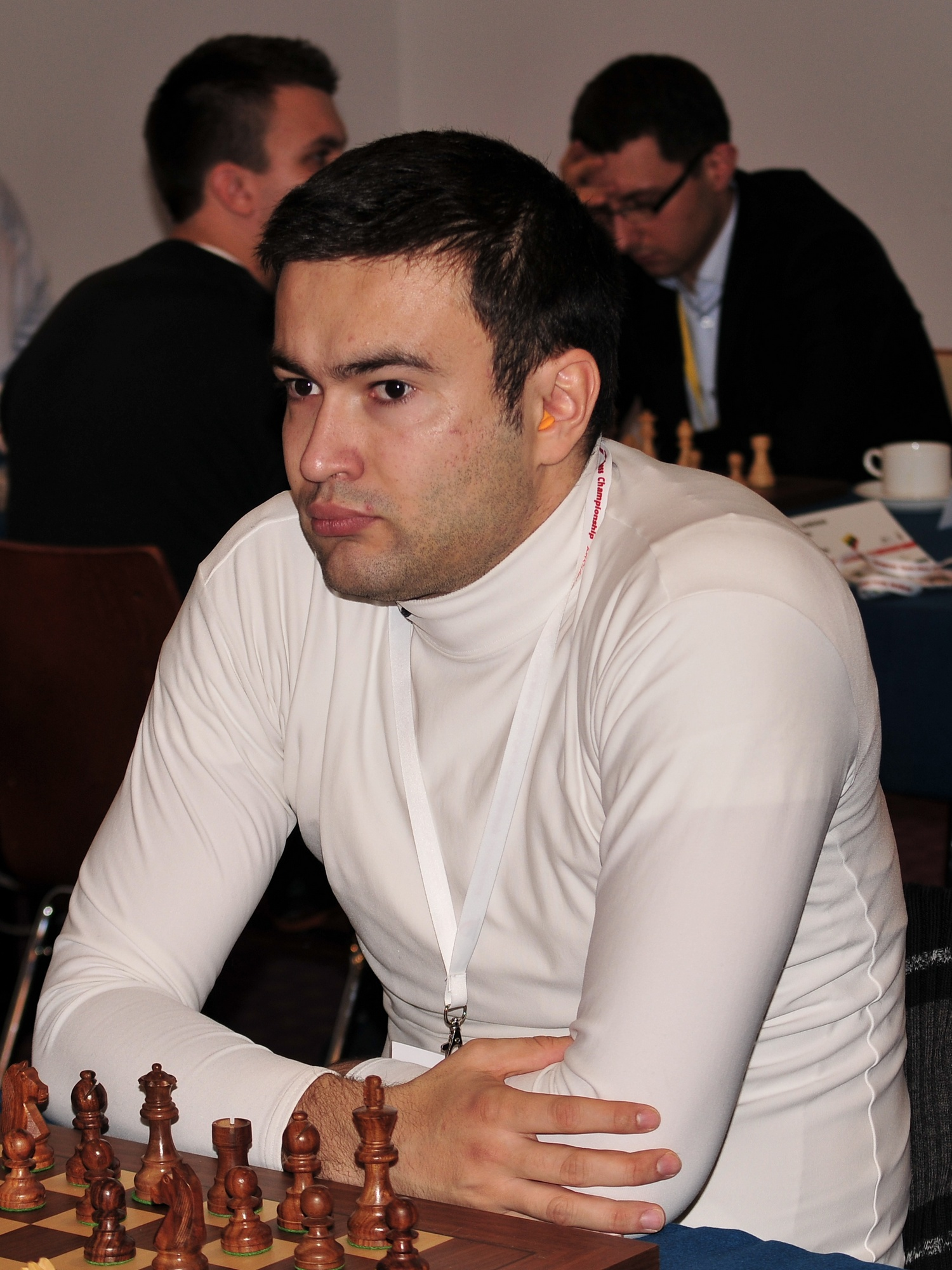
- Davor Palo, Warsaw 2013

Personal information
- Born: 2 November 1985 (age 40) Sarajevo, Bosnia and Herzegovina

Chess career
- Country: Denmark
- Title: Grandmaster (2005)
- FIDE rating: 2556 (July 2026)
- Peak rating: 2562 (April 2014)

Davor Palo (born 2 November 1985) is a Danish chess Grandmaster. Having obtained the title in 2005 at the age of 19, he is the second youngest grandmaster in the history of Denmark, behind Jonas Buhl Bjerre and ahead of Bent Larsen. He is originally from Bosnia and Herzegovina.

In 2013 he won the Danish Chess Championship.
