= Jonas Buhl Bjerre =

Danish chess grandmaster (born 2004)

- Bjerre in 2026

Personal information
- Born: 26 June 2004 (age 22)

Chess career
- Country: Denmark
- Title: Grandmaster (2019)
- FIDE rating: 2621 (November 2026)
- Peak rating: 2655 (July 2025)
- Peak ranking: No. 67 (August 2025)

Jonas Buhl Bjerre (born 26 June 2004) is a Danish chess grandmaster.

== Biography ==
In 2015, Jonas Buhl Bjerre won the Nordic Youth Chess Championship in the group E (for players born in 2004 and 2005). The next year he won the group D. Bjerre won a gold medal at the 2017 European Youth Chess Championships, held in Mamaia, in the U14 category. The next year, in Riga, he took the bronze medal in the same division.

In July 2018, Bjerre was awarded the title of international master by FIDE. A few months later he played for the Danish national team, on the reserve board, in the 43rd Chess Olympiad in Batumi (+4, =4, -1). He tied for first place with Allan Stig Rasmussen in the Danish championship 2019 and lost the playoff match. Bjerre achieved his final norm for the title of grandmaster at the FIDE Grand Swiss Tournament 2019 to become the youngest Dane ever to achieve this title. FIDE awarded him the title in March 2020.

Bjerre participated in the Tata Steel Chess Tournament 2022 Challengers group where he finished 3rd with a score of 8.5 / 13.
