= Gemzøe =

Gemzøe is a Danish surname. Notable people with the surname include:

- Jacob Gemzøe (1896–1986), Danish chess master
- Peter Gemzøe (1811–1879), Danish painter and lithographer
