= Bjorn Moller Ochsner =

Danish chess grandmaster (born 1994)

Personal information
- Born: October 23, 1994 (age 31) Aarhus, Denmark

Chess career
- Country: Denmark
- Title: Grandmaster (2023)
- FIDE rating: 2478 (September 2026)
- Peak rating: 2542 (February 2023)

Bjorn Moller Ochsner is a Danish chess grandmaster.

== Chess career ==
In February 2013, he won the Aarhus Championship, half a point ahead of runner-up Jens Ove Fries Nielsen.

In October 2020, he finished in second place in the Danish Chess Championship. He defeated Jesper Søndergaard Thybo in the final round, earning his second GM norm.

He was awarded the Grandmaster title in 2023, after achieving his norms at the:

- International Boeblingen Open in December 2018
- Danish National Championship in October 2020
- Danish Team Championship in March 2023
