= Lars Karlsson (chess player) =

Swedish chess grandmaster (born 1955)

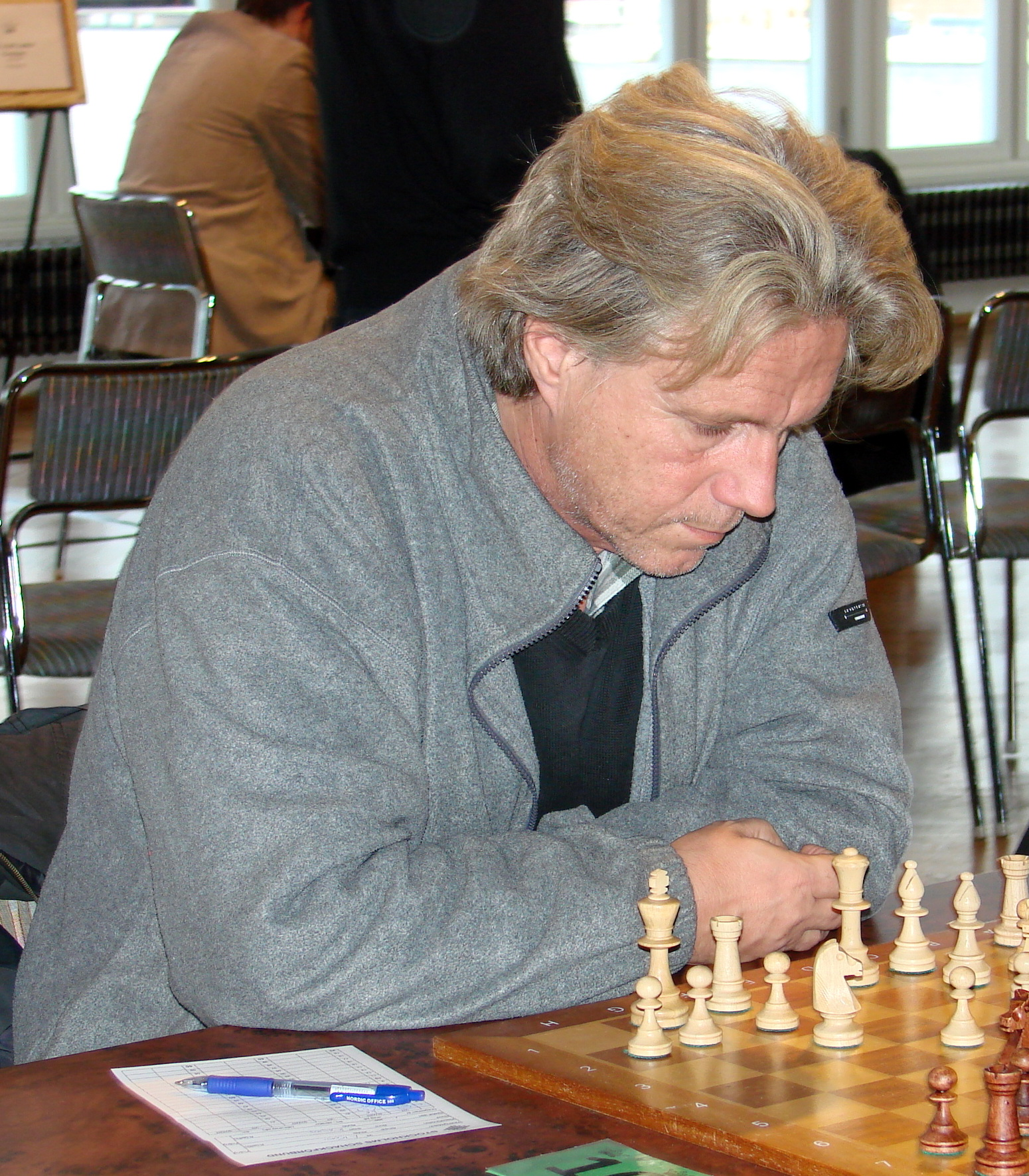
- Lars Karlsson in 2009

Personal information
- Born: 11 July 1955 (age 70) Stockholm, Sweden

Chess career
- Country: Sweden
- Title: Grandmaster (1982)
- FIDE rating: 2416 (July 2026)
- Peak rating: 2550 (January 1985)

Lars Karlsson (born 11 July 1955) is a Swedish chess grandmaster (1982), Swedish Chess Championship winner (1992).

== Biography ==
From the late 1970s to the mid-1990s, Karlsson belonged to the top Swedish chess players. In 1992 he won the Swedish Chess Championship. Karlsson won silver medals in the national championship twice (1979, 1986) and a bronze medal once (1976). In 1982 in Las Palmas he participated in the World Chess Championship Interzonal Tournament and ranked in 11th place.

Karlsson has appeared in many international chess tournaments, winning or sharing first place, including in Stockholm (Rilton Cup tournament, 1977/78), Malmö (1979), Hradec Králové (1979/80 and 1980/81), Silkeborg (1980), Esbjerg (1981, tournament The North Sea Cup), Niš (1981), Eksjö (1982, together with Lars-Åke Schneider), Helsinki (1983), Hastings (1983/84, together with Jon Speelman), Jönköping (1988), Oslo (1988, together with Jonathan Tisdall and Nigel Davies), Copenhagen (1988, 1989 together with Aleksander Sznapik and Jens Kristiansen), Hallsberg (1997, together with Eduardas Rozentalis), Stockholm (2006, 2007, 2014) and Barcelona (2009).

Lars Karlsson played for Sweden in the Chess Olympiads:

- In 1980, at second board in the 24th Chess Olympiad in La Valletta (+1, =2, -4),
- In 1982, at third board in the 25th Chess Olympiad in Lucerne (+2, =2, -4),
- In 1984, at second board in the 26th Chess Olympiad in Thessaloniki (+4, =7, -0),
- In 1990, at third board in the 29th Chess Olympiad in Novi Sad (+2, =1, -2).

Lars Karlsson played for Sweden in the European Team Chess Championships:

- In 1980, at second board in the 7th European Team Chess Championship in Skara (+1, =2, -4),
- In 1992, at first reserve board in the 10th European Team Chess Championship in Debrecen (+2, =3, -1),
- In 2005, at second board in the 15th European Team Chess Championship in Gothenburg (+2, =5, -1).

Lars Karlsson played for Sweden in the Nordic Chess Cup:

- In 1985, at first board in the 10th Nordic Chess Cup in Pohja (+4, =3, -0) and won team bronze medal,
- In 1987, at first board in the 11th Nordic Chess Cup in Słupsk (+3, =0, -1) and won team and individual gold medals.

In 1979, he was awarded the FIDE International Master (IM) title and received the FIDE Grandmaster (GM) title three years later.
