= Eigil Pedersen =

Danish chess player

Personal information
- Born: 23 May 1917 Aarhus, Denmark
- Died: 2 August 1994 (aged 77)

Chess career
- Country: Denmark

Eigil Pedersen (23 May 1917 – 2 August 1994), was a Danish chess player, three-times Danish Chess Championship winner (1951, 1953, 1961).

== Biography ==
In the 1950s and 1960s Eigil Pedersen was one of the strongest Danish chess players. Nine times he won medals at the Danish Chess Championships: three gold (1951, 1953, 1961), three silver (1957, 1960, 1964) and three bronze (1949, 1954, 1956). In 1952, Eigil Pedersen won a small match against the future chess grandmaster Bent Larsen.

Eigil Pedersen played for Denmark in the Chess Olympiads:

- In 1950, at third board in the 9th Chess Olympiad in Dubrovnik (+5, =4, -4),
- In 1952, at fourth board in the 10th Chess Olympiad in Helsinki (+5, =3, -6),
- In 1956, at third board in the 12th Chess Olympiad in Moscow (+3, =4, -4),
- In 1958, at fourth board in the 13th Chess Olympiad in Munich (+3, =4, -5),
- In 1966, at second reserve board in the 17th Chess Olympiad in Havana (+1, =0, -4).

Eigil Pedersen played for Denmark in the European Team Chess Championship:

- In 1970, at eight board in the 4th European Team Chess Championship in Kapfenberg (+1, =0, -3).
