= Jacob Gemzøe =

Danish chess player

Personal information
- Born: 25 July 1896
- Died: 4 April 1986 (aged 89)

Chess career
- Country: Denmark

Jacob Erhard Wilhjelm Gemzøe (25 July 1896 — 4 April 1986), was a Danish chess player, Danish Chess Championship winner (1928).

== Biography ==
From the 1920s to the 1940s, Jacob Gemzøe was one of Danish leading chess players. He participated many times in the finals of Danish Chess Championships and in 1928 in Horsens won gold medal. Jacob Gemzøe also shared 1st — 2nd places in the Danish Chess Championship in 1932, but lost the additional match for champions title Erik Andersen — ½ : 1½.

Jacob Gemzøe played for Denmark in the Chess Olympiads:

- In 1928, at third board in the 2nd Chess Olympiad in The Hague (+7, =2, -7),
- In 1930, at reserve board in the 3rd Chess Olympiad in Hamburg (+2, =2, -8),
- In 1933, at third board in the 5th Chess Olympiad in Folkestone (+0, =5, -5).
