= Erling Mortensen =

Danish chess player (born 1955)

Personal information
- Born: 5 April 1955 (age 71)

Chess career
- Country: Denmark
- Title: International Master (1980)
- FIDE rating: 2432 (September 2026)
- Peak rating: 2510 (January 1998)

Erling Mortensen (born 5 April 1955) is a Danish chess International Master (IM) (1980), four-times Danish Chess Championship winner (1981, 1987, 1989, 1991).

== Biography ==
From the mid-1970s to the mid-2000s Erling Mortensen was one of the leading Danish chess players. He participated many times in the finals of Danish Chess Championships and won four gold medals: 1981, 1987, 1989, and 1991. In 1989, in Espoo he participated in World Chess Championship Zonal tournament and shared 10th-11th place. He has participated in many international chess tournaments, where he has achieved the best success: 1st place in Winterthur (1976), 2nd place in Copenhagen (1983), 1st place in Reykjavik Open (1990), 2nd place in Valby (1994), 1st place in Politiken Cup (Copenhagen, 1997), 3rd place in Koga (1997), 1st place in Copenhagen (2004).

Erling Mortensen played for Denmark in the Chess Olympiads:

- In 1976, at second reserve board in the 22nd Chess Olympiad in Haifa (+3, =3, -1),
- In 1980, at fourth board in the 24th Chess Olympiad in La Valletta (+5, =5, -1),
- In 1982, at second board in the 25th Chess Olympiad in Lucerne (+5, =6, -1),
- In 1984, at third board in the 26th Chess Olympiad in Thessaloniki (+5, =5, -1),
- In 1988, at fourth board in the 28th Chess Olympiad in Thessaloniki (+4, =3, -3),
- In 1990, at third board in the 29th Chess Olympiad in Novi Sad (+3, =3, -4),
- In 1992, at first board in the 30th Chess Olympiad in Manila (+4, =5, -3),
- In 1994, at second board in the 31st Chess Olympiad in Moscow (+3, =3, -5),
- In 1996, at fourth board in the 32nd Chess Olympiad in Yerevan (+3, =4, -3),
- In 2002, at fourth board in the 35th Chess Olympiad in Bled (+2, =1, -3),
- In 2004, at second reserve board in the 36th Chess Olympiad in Calvià (+4, =4, -1).

Erling Mortensen played for Denmark in the European Team Chess Championships:

- In 1983, at first board in the 8th European Team Chess Championship in Plovdiv (+0, =4, -3),
- In 1992, at second board in the 10th European Team Chess Championship in Debrecen (+4, =1, -3).

Erling Mortensen played for Denmark in the Nordic Chess Cups:

- In 1977, at second board in the 8th Nordic Chess Cup in Glücksburg (+3, =1, -1) and won team and individual gold medals,
- In 1985, at third board in the 10th Nordic Chess Cup in Pohja (+3, =3, -1) and won team silver medal,
- In 1989, at first board in the 12th Nordic Chess Cup in Aabybro (+4, =2, -1) and won team bronze and individual gold medals.

In 1980, Erling Mortensen was awarded the FIDE International Master (IM) title.
