= Curt Hansen (chess player) =

Danish chess grandmaster

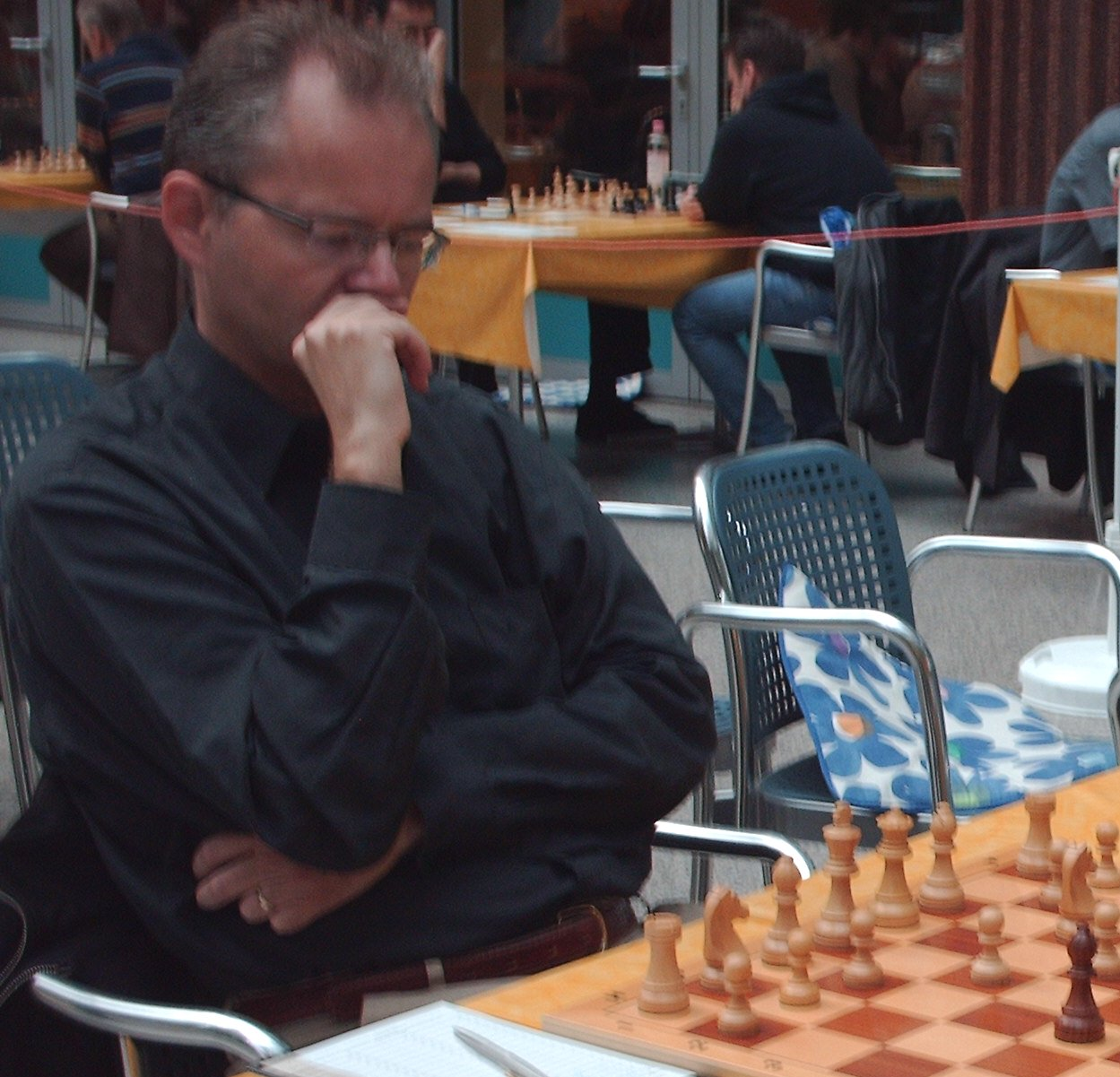
- Playing the German Bundesliga in 2006

Personal information
- Born: September 18, 1964 (age 61) Bov, Sønderjylland, Denmark

Chess career
- Country: Denmark
- Title: FIDE Grandmaster (1985); ICCF Grandmaster (1998)
- FIDE rating: 2590 (July 2026)
- Peak rating: 2635 (July 1992)
- Peak ranking: No. 18 (July 1992)
- ICCF rating: 2653 (April 2002)
- ICCF peak rating: 2674 (April 2000)

Curt Hansen (born September 18, 1964) is a Danish chess grandmaster and a former World Junior Champion. He is a six-time Danish Champion.

== Chess career ==
A strong junior player, Hansen had major successes in international youth competitions, commencing with the then Groningen-based European Junior Chess Championship, where he finished first in 1982 and second in 1983. The next year, he became the World Junior Champion in Kiljava, ahead of Alexei Dreev and beating the defending champion Kiril Georgiev, and was awarded the International Master title. In 1985, he became a Grandmaster after earning the necessary norms.

In domestic chess, he succeeded Bent Larsen as Denmark's strongest player and between 1983 and 2000 won the Danish Championship six times. By 1992, his rating had reached 2600 and later the same year rose to 2635, giving him his highest ever rank of 18 on the FIDE list (tied for 14 on rating but with fewer games played).

Hansen has represented his country five times at the Olympiad between 1984 and 2000, always playing first board and always scoring in excess of 50%. He was twice shared winner at the traditional Sigeman & Co. tournament in Malmö, in 1994 (with Ferdinand Hellers) and in 2004 (with Peter Heine Nielsen), ahead of Magnus Carlsen and Alexander Beliavsky. His list of international tournament successes also includes outright or shared first places at Borgarnes 1984, Vejstrup 1989 (ahead of Ian Rogers, including all three Polgar sisters in a round robin of ten players), Groningen 1991, Tastrup 1992, Aalborg 1994, Vejle 1994, and Reykjavík Zonal 1995.
