= Mads Andersen (chess player) =

Danish chess grandmaster (born 1995)

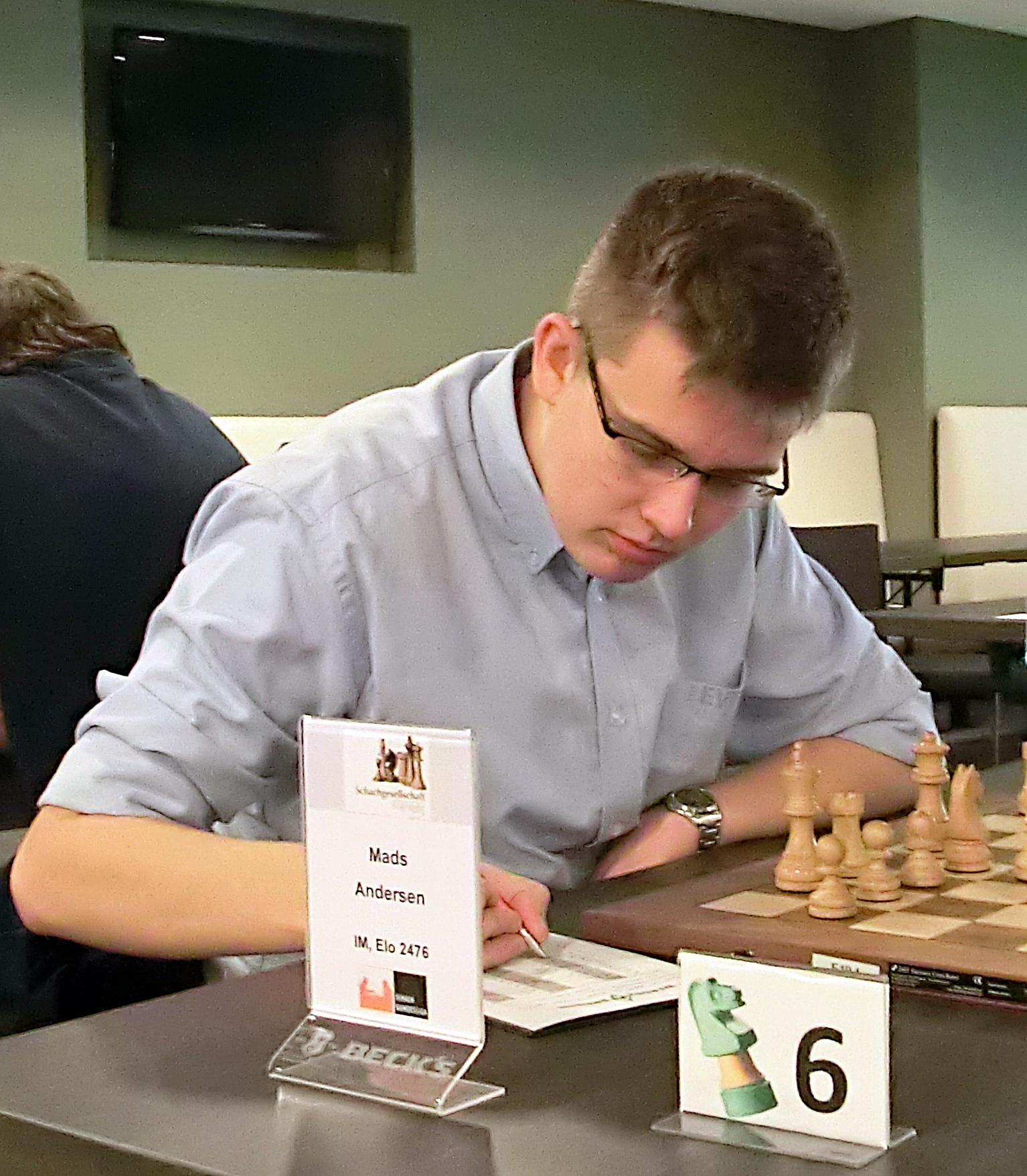
- Mads Andersen, 2013

Personal information
- Born: 1 March 1995 (age 31) Nuuk, Greenland, Denmark

Chess career
- Country: Denmark
- Title: Grandmaster (2016)
- FIDE rating: 2559 (July 2026)
- Peak rating: 2618 (December 2023)

Mads Andersen (born 1 March 1995) is a Danish chess grandmaster. He is a three-time Danish Chess Champion.

== Chess career ==
Born in 1995, Andersen earned his international master title in 2011 and his grandmaster title in 2016. He won the Danish Chess Championship in 2016 and 2017. In March 2018, he competed in the European Individual Chess Championship. He finished in one-hundredth place, scoring 6/11 (+3–2=5).

Andersen's first tournament win was in the 5th Open Amateur in Calvia in which he tied first place with Francisco Lopez Colon, Ehsan Ali, and Pedro Jose Barcelo Pujadas. He won the GM Visma Chess Tournament in 2014 in Växjö, Sweden, ahead of GM Tiger Hillarp Persson.

Andersen competed in the 2009 World U14 championship, scoring 8/11 and placing 5th along with Pouya Idani. He placed 4th- 9th in the 2010 World U16 Youth Championship along with Benjamin Bok, Marcin Krzyżanowski, Sergey Savitskiy, Maxime Lagarde, Chang Liu.

As of November 2020, Andersen is ranked as the 2nd best chess player in Denmark.
