= Johannes Petersen =

Danish chess player

Personal information
- Born: unknown
- Died: unknown

Chess career
- Country: Denmark

Johannes Petersen (unknown — unknown), was a Danish chess player, Danish Chess Championship winner (1920).

== Biography ==
In the 1920s and 1930s Johannes Petersen was one of Danish leading chess players. In 1920, in Aalborg he won unofficial Danish Chess Championship. Also he was Danish Chess Championship's silver (1927) and bronze (1923, 1924) medalist.

Johannes Petersen played for Denmark in the Chess Olympiad:

- In 1937, at reserve board in the 7th Chess Olympiad in Stockholm (+3, =1, -7).

Johannes Petersen played for Denmark in the unofficial Chess Olympiad:

- In 1936, at eighth board in the 3rd unofficial Chess Olympiad in Munich (+10, =4, -4).
