= Christian Poulsen (chess player) =

Danish chess player

Christian Poulsen (Rind, 16 August 1912 – 19 April 1981) was a Danish chess master.

Poulsen worked on a farm in Denmark from the age of seven with his brothers, and never attended any kind of formal schooling. At a young age, he helped with efforts to make the usually infertile land of Jutland suitable for farming. He married a Swedish women with the last name of Hallgren, and had a son with her, who took the name of Øjvin Hallgren.

He won twice in Danish Chess Championship (1945, 1952), and thrice shared 1st but lost playoff matches for the title in 1939, 1940, and 1951.

Poulsen represented Denmark in 3rd unofficial Chess Olympiad at Munich 1936, and five times in official Chess Olympiads (1937, 1939, 1950, 1952, 1956). He also played in several friendly matches; Scandinavia vs. Germany (Bremen 1938), Denmark vs. Norway (Oslo 1947, Oslo 1952), and Denmark vs. Sweden (Saltsjöbaden 1948, Copenhagen 1949).

He tied for 5-6th at Beverwijk 1951 (the Hoogovens tournament, Hermann Pilnik won), and tied for 4-5th at Viborg Jubilee 1957 (Ludwig Rellstab won).
