= Børge Andersen (chess player) =

Danish chess player (1934–1993)

Personal information
- Born: 19 March 1934
- Died: 8 February 1993 (aged 58)

Chess career
- Country: Denmark
- Title: International Master (1964)

Børge Andersen (19 March 1934 — 8 February 1993) was a Danish chess International Master (IM) (1964), four-times Danish Chess Championship winner (1958, 1967, 1968, 1973).

== Biography ==
From the mid-1950s to the mid-1970s, Børge Andersen was one of the leading Danish chess players. He participated many times in the finals of Danish Chess Championships, four times (1958, 1967, 1968, 1973) winning gold and six times (1959, 1961, 1962, 1965, 1966, 1975) - silver medals.

Børge Andersen played for Denmark in the Chess Olympiads:

- In 1954, at second reserve board in the 11th Chess Olympiad in Amsterdam (+6, =2, -5),
- In 1958, at second board in the 13th Chess Olympiad in Munich (+6, =2, -6),
- In 1964, at first board in the 16th Chess Olympiad in Tel Aviv (+9, =4, -2),
- In 1966, at third board in the 17th Chess Olympiad in Havana (+6, =4, -5),
- In 1974, at first board in the 21st Chess Olympiad in Nice (+3, =7, -5).

Børge Andersen played for Denmark in the European Team Chess Championship preliminaries:

- In 1970, at first board in the 4th European Team Chess Championship preliminaries (+1, =1, -1),
- In 1973, at reserve board in the 5th European Team Chess Championship preliminaries (+1, =2, -0).

Børge Andersen played for Denmark in the World Student Team Chess Championship:

- In 1957, at third board in the 4th World Student Team Chess Championship in Reykjavík (+4, =2, -6).

Børge Andersen played for Denmark in the Clare Benedict Chess Cups:

- In 1973, at second board in the 20th Clare Benedict Chess Cup in Gstaad (+2, =1, -3) and won team bronze medal.

Børge Andersen participated in several international tournaments, including in Dresden (1956), Copenhagen (1960, memorial of Aron Nimzowitsch, and 1965), Krems an der Donau (1967), Büsum (1968), Nordic Chess Championship (1973) and Gstaad (1973), but not achieving significant successes. In 1964, he was awarded the FIDE International Master (IM) title. In 1975, Børge Andersen finished his chess career.
