= Svend Hamann =

Danish chess player (born 1940)

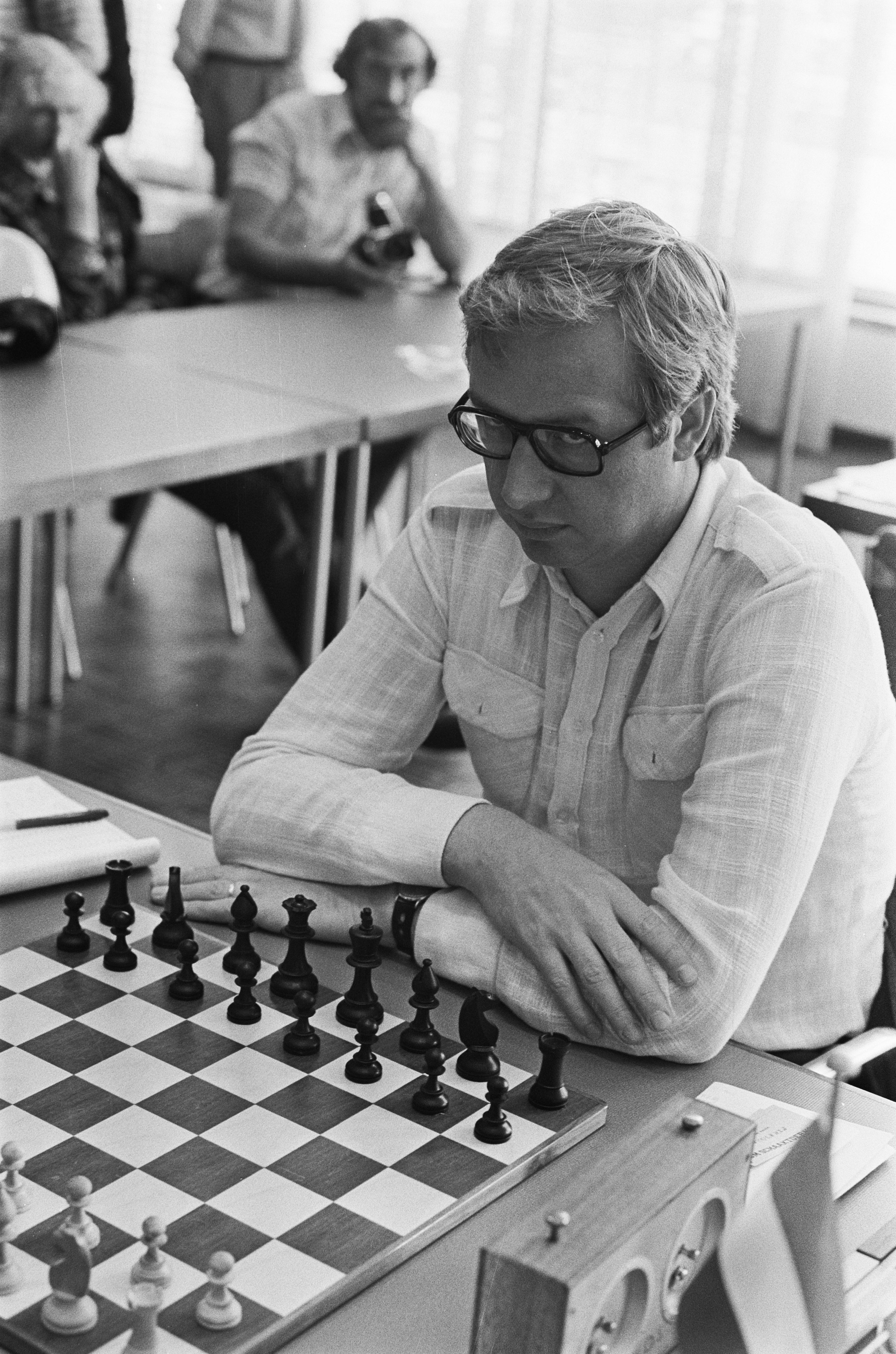

Personal information
- Born: 8 October 1940 (age 85) Copenhagen, Denmark

Chess career
- Country: Denmark
- Title: International Master (1965)
- Peak rating: 2490 (July 1971)
- Peak ranking: No. 78 (July 1972)

Svend Hamann (born 8 October 1940), is a Danish chess International Master (IM) (1965), Danish Chess Championship winner (1972).

== Biography ==
In the 1960s and 1970s Svend Hamann was one of the strongest Danish chess players after chess grandmaster Bent Larsen. In 1965, he was awarded the FIDE International Master (IM) title. In 1971, in Hjørring he won silver medal in Danish Chess Championship. In 1972, in Esbjerg he won Danish Chess Championship.

Svend Hamann played for Denmark in the Chess Olympiads:

- In 1968, at third board in the 18th Chess Olympiad in Lugano (+5, =8, -2),
- In 1972, at first board in the 20th Chess Olympiad in Skopje (+4, =9, -6),
- In 1978, at first board in the 23rd Chess Olympiad in Buenos Aires (+3, =7, -2).

Svend Hamann played for Denmark in the World Student Team Chess Championships:

- In 1962, at first board in the 9th World Student Team Chess Championship in Mariánské Lázně (+6, =2, -3),
- In 1967, at first board in the 14th World Student Team Chess Championship in Harrachov (+1, =5, -5).

Svend Hamann played for Denmark in the Clare Benedict Chess Cups:

- In 1973, at first board in the 20th Clare Benedict Chess Cup in Gstaad (+3, =2, -1) and won team bronze and individual gold medal,
- In 1974, at second board in the 21st Clare Benedict Chess Cup in Cala Galdana (+1, =3, -3),
- In 1977, at second board in the 22nd Clare Benedict Chess Cup in Copenhagen (+3, =3, -0) and won team and individual gold medals.
