= Gladiator chess =

Style of chess tournaments

Gladiator chess is a chess tournament style. It was introduced in the 2006 Danish Chess Championships.

In gladiator chess no draws are accepted. In case the game ends in a draw, it is played again with reversed colors and shorter time limits. Specifically the first game is played so that each player has 100 minutes for 40 moves and then 30 minutes, always adding 30 seconds per move. In case of a draw, the time settings are changed to 25 minutes, adding 10 seconds per move. In case of another draw, the players continue to play blitz chess, 10 minutes per player, adding 5 seconds per move.
