= Sejer Holm =

Danish chess player

Personal information
- Born: 10 August 1939 (age 86)

Chess career
- Country: Denmark
- Title: FIDE Master (2010)
- Peak rating: 2395 (July 1972)

Sejer Holm (born 10 August 1939) is a Danish chess FIDE Master (FM) (2010), Danish Chess Championship winner (1965) and Nordic Chess Championship winner (1975).

== Biography ==
From the early 1960s to the early 1980s, Sejer Holm was one of the leading Danish chess players. He participated in the finals of Danish Chess Championships many times and won a gold medal in 1965. In 1975, Sejer Holm won the Nordic Chess Championship. He also won the Copenhagen City Chess Championship twice (1997, 1998).

Sejer Holm played for Denmark in the Chess Olympiads:

- in 1960, at the third board in the 14th Chess Olympiad in Leipzig (+7, =4, -5),
- in 1962, at the second board in the 15th Chess Olympiad in Varna (+5, =5, -5),
- in 1966, at the first reserve board in the 17th Chess Olympiad in Havana (+6, =2, -5),
- in 1968, at the fourth board in the 18th Chess Olympiad in Lugano (+2, =7, -2),
- in 1970, at the second reserve board in the 19th Chess Olympiad in Siegen (+6, =3, -2),
- in 1972, at the fourth board in the 20th Chess Olympiad in Skopje (+2, =6, -7).

Sejer Holm played for Denmark in the European Team Chess Championships:

- in 1970, at the sixth board in the 4th European Team Chess Championship in Kapfenberg (+0, =3, -3),
- in 1983, at the seventh board in the 8th European Team Chess Championship in Plovdiv (+1, =1, -3).

Sejer Holm also played for Denmark in the Nordic Chess Cups twice (1973, 1983) where he won gold (1973) and silver (1983) medals in team competition and a gold (1973) medal in individual competition.
