= Bo Jacobsen =

Danish chess player (born 1948)

Personal information
- Born: 12 December 1948 (age 77) Randers, Denmark

Chess career
- Country: Denmark

Bo Jacobsen (born 12 December 1948), is a Danish chess player, Danish Chess Championship winner (1976).

== Biography ==
In the mid-1970s Jacobsen was one of the leading Danish chess players. He participated many times in the finals of Danish Chess Championships and won gold medal in 1976.

He played for Denmark in the Chess Olympiad:

- In 1974, at second reserve board in the 21st Chess Olympiad in Nice (+7, =4, -3).

Jacobsen played for Denmark in the European Team Chess Championship:

- In 1970, at fourth board in the 4th European Team Chess Championship in Kapfenberg (+0, =2, -5).

In 2009, in Condino Jacobsen participated in World Senior Chess Championship and shared 3rd-9th place.
