= Ulrik Rath =

Danish chess player (born 1946)

Personal information
- Born: 25 December 1946 (age 79)

Chess career
- Country: Denmark
- Title: FIDE Master (1980)
- Peak rating: 2420 (January 1977)

Ulrik Rath (born 25 December 1946), is a Danish chess FIDE Master (FM), Danish Chess Championship winner (1974), North Sea Cup winner (1975).

== Biography ==
In the mid-1970s Rath was one of the leading Danish chess players. He participated many times in the finals of Danish Chess Championships and won gold medal in 1974. In 1975, Rath won 1st North Sea Cup Chess tournament. In 1976, he won International Chess tournament in Aarhus.

Rath played for Denmark in the Chess Olympiads:

- In 1974, at second board in the 21st Chess Olympiad in Nice (+4, =10, −2),
- In 1976, at first board in the 22nd Chess Olympiad in Haifa (+2, =4, −3).

Rath played for Denmark in the European Team Chess Championship preliminaries:

- In 1977, at sixth board in the 6th European Team Chess Championship preliminaries (+1, =1, −1).

Rath played for Denmark in the Clare Benedict Cup:

- In 1977, at third board in the 22nd Clare Benedict Chess Cup in Copenhagen (+0, =5, −0) and won team gold medal.

Rath played for Denmark in the Nordic Chess Cup:

- In 1977, at first board in the 8th Nordic Chess Cup in Glücksburg (+0, =4, −1) and won team bronze medal.
