= Ole Jakobsen =

Danish chess player (1942–2010)

Personal information
- Born: 19 October 1942
- Died: 30 June 2010 (aged 67)

Chess career
- Country: Denmark
- Title: International Master (IM) (1973)

Ole Jakobsen (19 October 1942 — 30 June 2010), was a Danish chess International Master (IM) (1973), three-times Danish Chess Championship winner (1969, 1971, 1980), Nordic Chess Championship winner (1969).

== Biography ==
From the 1960s to the 1980s, Ole Jakobsen was one of Danish leading chess players. He participated many times in the finals of Danish Chess Championships and won three gold medals in 1969, 1971, 1980, and three silver medal in 1968, 1974, 1984. In 1975, in Linköping Ole Jakobsen won Nordic Chess Championship ahead of Ulf Andersson and Heikki Westerinen. Ole Jakobsen was winner of many international chess tournament awards, including first or shared first place in Zürich (1962, junior chess tournament), Stockholm (1973/74, Rilton Cup), Las Palmas (2005).

Ole Jakobsen played for Denmark in the Chess Olympiads:

- In 1964, at first reserve board in the 16th Chess Olympiad in Tel Aviv (+8, =5, -3),
- In 1972, at second board in the 20th Chess Olympiad in Skopje (+3, =8, -6),
- In 1978, at second board in the 23rd Chess Olympiad in Buenos Aires (+3, =8, -1),
- In 1980, at first board in the 24th Chess Olympiad in La Valletta (+2, =5, -4),
- In 1984, at fourth board in the 26th Chess Olympiad in Thessaloniki (+4, =4, -4).

Ole Jakobsen played for Denmark in the European Team Chess Championships:

- In 1970, at first board in the 4th European Team Chess Championship in Kapfenberg (+0, =6, -1),
- In 1983, at fourth board in the 8th European Team Chess Championship in Plovdiv (+0, =3, -3).

Ole Jakobsen played for Denmark in the World Student Team Chess Championships:

- In 1961, at second board in the 8th World Student Team Chess Championship in Helsinki (+4, =1, -7),
- In 1962, at second board in the 9th World Student Team Chess Championship in Mariánské Lázně (+5, =4, -2),
- In 1966, at third board in the 13th World Student Team Chess Championship in Örebro (+4, =6, -2) and won team bronze medal.

Ole Jakobsen played for Denmark in the Clare Benedict Cup:

- In 1973, at third board in the 20th Clare Benedict Chess Cup in Gstaad (+2, =4, -0) and won team bronze medal.
