= Palle Ravn =

Danish chess player

Personal information
- Born: 13 December 1928
- Died: 20 May 2012 (aged 83)

Chess career
- Country: Denmark

Palle Ravn (13 December 1928 – 20 May 2012) was a Danish chess player, Danish Chess Championship winner (1957).

== Biography ==
In the end of 1950s Palle Ravn was one of Danish leading young chess players. In 1955, he shared 1st place with future grandmaster Bent Larsen in Copenhagen City Chess Championship. In 1957, in Odense Palle Ravn won Danish Chess Championship.

Palle Ravn played for Denmark in the Chess Olympiad:

- In 1958, at first reserve board in the 13th Chess Olympiad in Munich (+3, =3, -4).

Palle Ravn played for Denmark in the World Student Team Chess Championship:

- In 1957, at second board in the 4th World Student Team Chess Championship in Reykjavík (+3, =2, -7).

Palle Ravn later preferred a life without participating in chess tournaments.
