= Jesper Søndergaard Thybo =

Danish chess grandmaster (born 1999)

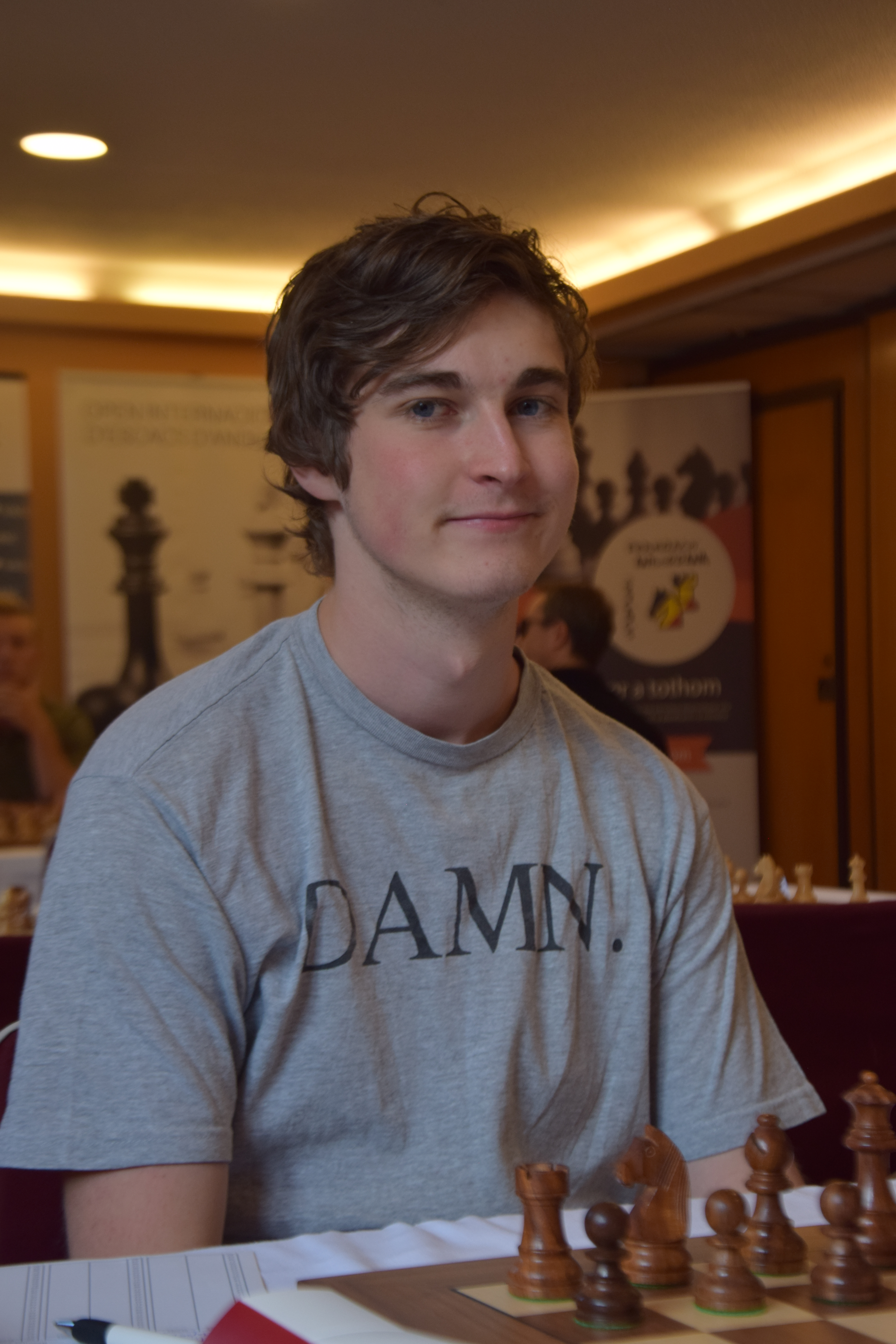
- Thybo at the 2019 Andorra open

Personal information
- Born: 10 January 1999 (age 27)

Chess career
- Country: Denmark
- Title: Grandmaster (2020)
- FIDE rating: 2579 (July 2026)
- Peak rating: 2604 (November 2021)

Jesper Søndergaard Thybo (born 10 January 1999) is a Danish chess grandmaster (achieved in 2020).

== Biography ==
Thybo has played two times for Denmark at the World Youth U16 Chess Olympiads (2012 and 2014); it was in 2014 that Thybo became a FIDE Master (FM). In 2016, he won the Nordic Youth Chess Championship.

2017 proved to be a very productive year for Thybo. He had repeatedly represented Denmark at the European Youth Chess Championship and World Youth Chess Championships in different age groups, culminating in the acquisition of a gold medal in 2017 in the European Youth Chess Championship in the U18 age group. In the same year, in Jūrmala, Thybo won a tournament with an International Master norm. Additionally, he won third place in the Danish Chess Championship. Again in 2017, Thybo played for Denmark in the European Team Chess Championship; furthermore, at the second board of the 21st European Team Chess Championship in Crete, he scored +1, =6, -1. It was also in 2017 that Thybo was awarded the FIDE International Master (IM) title.

In 2019, Thybo won the Aarhus Chess House GM tournament with 7/9 points.

From February to July 2020, Thybo was ranked as the 2nd-best chess player in Denmark. As of July 2022, he is the 6th-highest-ranked active Danish player, including a peak rating of 2604 that was achieved in November 2021.
