= International Research Association for Talent Development and Excellence =

Scientific professional organization

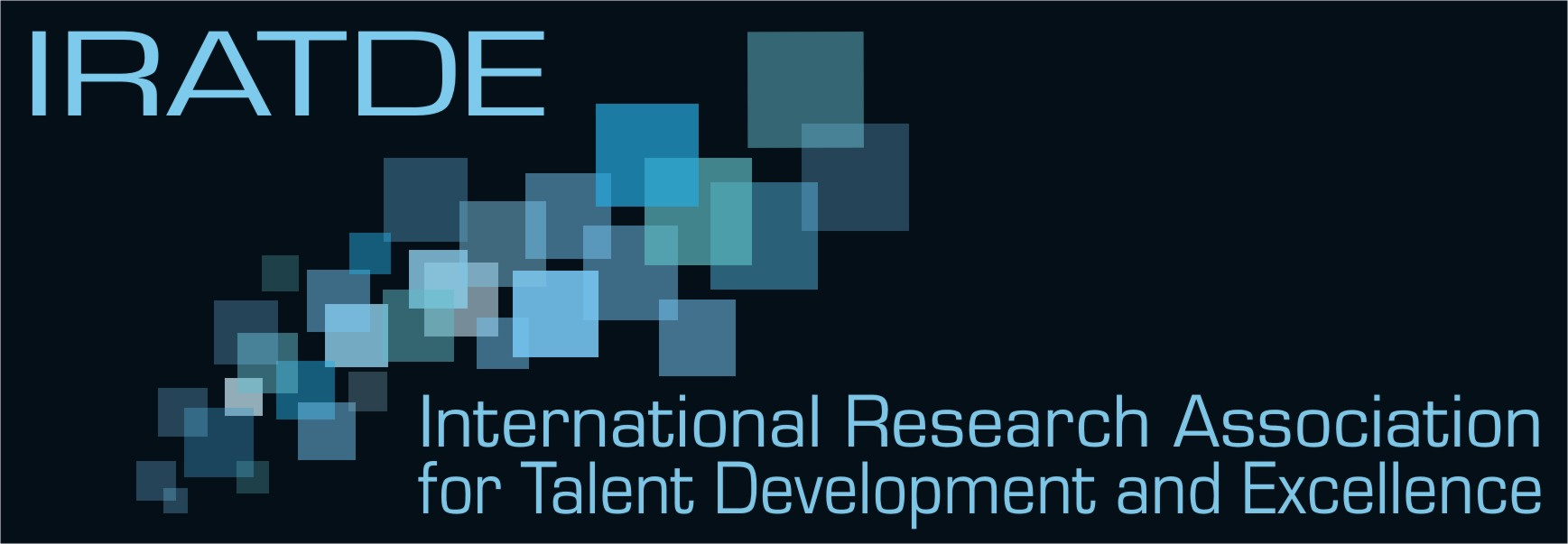
Iratde logo

The International Research Association for Talent Development and Excellence (IRATDE) is a non-profit professional organization of international scientists in the fields of talent development, creativity, innovation and excellence. Founded in 2008, the IRATDE seeks to promote collaboration and cooperation between scholars, professionals, and organizations.

== Activities ==
The IRATDE hosts a biennial international conference on gifted and talented children, innovation and invention, and excellence across domains. The conference is held in odd years during the months of September through November. The first biennial IRATDE conference was entitled the International Conference on the Cultivation and Education of Creativity and Innovation and was held in Xi'an, China from October 30 to November 2, 2009. The second was scheduled in Jubail, Saudi Arabia, from November 26–30, 2011. In addition, the IRATDE periodically hosts scientific symposia, such as the symposium Nurturing Giftedness Starts Early at King Faisal University in Saudi Arabia from May 31 to June 2, 2010.

The IRATDE publishes a twice-annual peer-reviewed scholarly journal, Talent Development & Excellence, containing original research or theory in the fields of talent development, excellence, innovation, or expertise. The organisation also has a newsletter, Talent Talks, for IRATDE members.

== Membership ==
The IRATDE currently has approximately 400 members from around 60 countries, with Full Membership available for scientists and researchers and Affiliated Memberships for organizations and practitioners.

== Executive committee ==
- President - Abdullah Aljughaiman, Director of the National Research Center for Giftedness and Creativity, Dean of the Institute of Research and Consulting, King Faisal University, Al-Ahsa, Saudi Arabia
- Vice President - Heidrun Stoeger, Professor of Education, Chair for School Research, School Development and Evaluation, University of Regensburg, Germany
- Secretary General - Albert Ziegler, Professor of Psychology, Head of Educational Psychology at the Institute of Psychology and Education, University of Ulm, Germany
- Treasurer - Jiannong Shi, Director of the Division of Developmental and Educational Psychology, Institute of Psychology, Chinese Academy of Sciences; Director of the Research Center for Supernormal Children, Institute of Psychology, Chinese Academy of Sciences, China
- Executive Officer - Wilma Vialle, Professor in Educational Psychology and Associate Dean in the Faculty of Education, University of Wollongong, Australia.
