= Colvig Gulch =

Valley in Jackson County, Oregon, United States

Coordinates: 42°25′34″N 123°05′39″W

Colvig Gulch is a valley in the Jackson County, Oregon.

Colvig Gulch was named in the 1860s after one Dr. William L. Colvig.
