= Jens Enevoldsen =

Danish chess player (1907–1980)

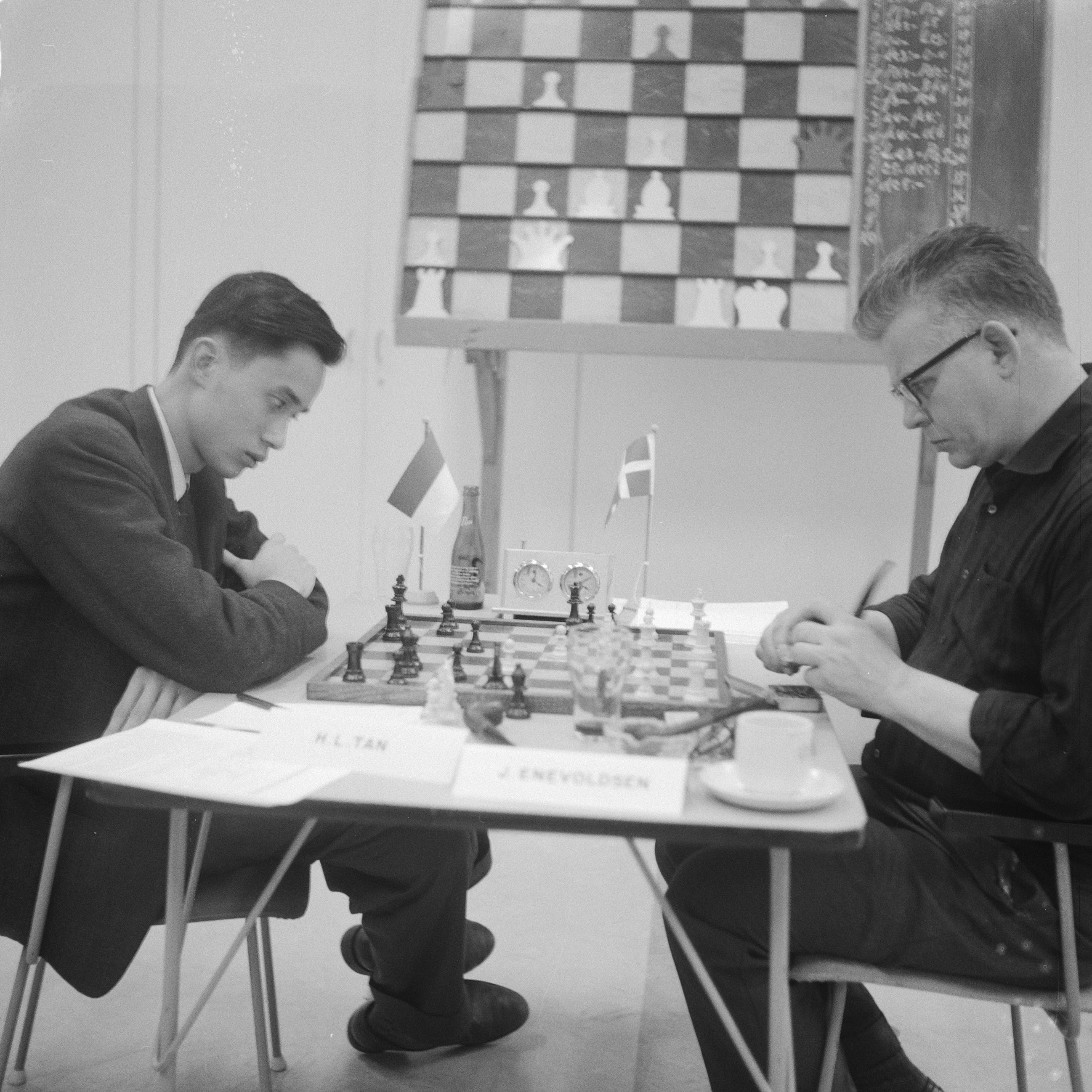
Hiong Liong Tan vs. Enevoldsen (1961)

Jens Evald Enevoldsen-Elsing (23 September 1907 – 23 May 1980) was a Danish chess master born in Copenhagen.

== Chess career ==
Enevoldsen won the Danish Chess Championship five times (1940, 1943, 1947, 1948, and 1960). In 1939 he shared first but lost a playoff, and in 1950 he again shared first but lost a lottery.

He took 4th place at the Helsinki 1947 zonal tournament; Eero Böök and Gösta Stoltz shared first place.

Enevoldsen played for Denmark ten times in Chess Olympiads (1933, 1935, 1937, 1939, 1952, 1956, 1958, 1966, 1970, and 1972).

He was awarded the International Master (IM) title in 1950 and was made an International Arbiter (IA) in 1960.

== Notable game ==
Enevoldsen - Nimzowitsch

Position: g8 black rook, h8 black king, d7 black bishop, f7 black pawn, g7 white knight, h7 white knight, b6 black queen, e6 black pawn, g6 black knight, d5 black pawn, e5 white pawn, c4 black pawn, d4 white pawn, a3 black bishop, c3 white pawn, h3 white pawn, c2 white bishop, d2 white bishop, e2 white queen, f2 white pawn, g2 white pawn, g1 white king

Position after 28.Nxh7!

In a 1933 tournament in Copenhagen, the little known Enevoldsen defeats Aron Nimzowitsch, one of the world's leading players, with an overwhelming king's side attack featuring a rare double knight sacrifice.

Enevoldsen–Nimzowitsch, Copenhagen 1933 Queen's Pawn Opening (ECO A46)
1. d4 Nf6 2. Nf3 e6 3. e3 c5 4. Bd3 Nc6 5. c3 Be7 6. O-O b6 7. a3 O-O 8. e4 d5 9. e5 Nd7 10. Qe2 Re8 11. Bf4 a5 12. Nbd2 c4 13. Bc2 b5 14. Ne4 Nf8 15. Ng3 Bd7 16. h3 Ra7 17. Nh2 b4 18. axb4 axb4 19. Rxa7 Nxa7 20. Ra1 Nb5 21. Bd2 Qb6 22. Ng4 bxc3 23. bxc3 Na3 24. Rxa3! Bxa3 25. Nh5 Ng6 26. Ngf6+ Kh8 27. Nxg7! Rg8 28. Nxh7! (diagram) Kxg7 29. Qh5 f5 30. exf6+ Kf7 31. Ng5+ Kxf6 32. Qf3+ Ke7 33. Qf7+ Kd8 34. Qxg8+ Nf8 35. Nh7 Qb2 36. Nxf8 Qxc2 37. Nxe6+ Ke7 38. Bg5+ Kd6 39. Qf8+ Kc6 40. Qxa3 1-0

Enevoldsen relates that he and Nimzowitsch subsequently became good friends, Nimzowitsch describing him as "the hope of Danish chess". At his request, Enevoldsen was buried alongside Nimzowitsch in Bispebjerg cemetery, Copenhagen.

== Bibliography ==
Enevoldsen authored several chess books in Danish, as well as one book on bridge.

- Skak for Viderekomne : det positionelle Angreb [Chess for Advanced Players : The Positional Attack]. Jespersen og Pio. 1940. OCLC 468211487.
- Lærebog i skak : begyndelsesgrundene, Bind 1: Aabningsspillet [Chess Textbook : First Principles, Volume 1: The Opening Game]. Jespersen og Pio. 1941. OCLC 769951094.
- Lærebog i skak : begyndelsesgrundene, Bind 2: Midtspillet [Chess Textbook : First Principles, Volume 2: The Middle Game]. Jespersen og Pio. 1943. OCLC 774468993.
- Lærebog i skak : begyndelsesgrundene, Bind 3:1: Slutspillet [Chess Textbook : First Principles, Volume 3.1: The Endgame]. Jespersen og Pio. 1943. OCLC 873291487.
- Lærebog i skak : begyndelsesgrundene, Bind 3:2: Slutspillet [Chess Textbook : First Principles, Volume 3.2: The Endgame]. Jespersen og Pio. 1944. OCLC 873291499.
- Hvermands skakbog [Everyman's Chess Book]. Jespersen og Pio. 1945. OCLC 64889433.
- Lærebog i skak : begyndelsesgrundene, Bind 3:3: Slutspillet [Chess Textbook : First Principles, Volume 3.3: The Endgame]. Jespersen og Pio. 1949. OCLC 873291488.
- Tredive år ved skakbrættet [Thirty Years at the Chessboard]. Jespersen og Pio. 1952. OCLC 2903985.
- Åbningsspillet i skak [Opening Games in Chess]. Dansk Skakforlag. 1961. OCLC 469749126.
- Tårnslutspillet i skak [Rook Endgames in Chess]. J. Fr. Clausen. 1964. OCLC 486140646.
- De første trin i skak [The First Step in Chess]. J. Fr. Clausen. 1965. OCLC 466922441.
- Bondeslutspillet i skak [Pawn Endgames in Chess]. J. Fr. Clausen. 1966. OCLC 6985747.
- Hyg Dem med skak [Fun with Chess]. Obelisk. 1966. OCLC 463514339.
- Verdens bedste skak, 1: Romantikken og modernismen [The World's Best Chess, 1:Romanticism and Modernism]. Politiken. 1966. OCLC 873099224.
- Verdens bedste skak, 2: Hypermodernismen og Capablanca-Aljechin perioden [The World's Best Chess, 2: Hypermodernism and the Capablanca-Alekhine period]. Politiken. 1968. OCLC 873099231.
- Bobby Fischers vej til VM [Bobby Fischer's Road to the World Championship]. Bramsen & Hjort. 1972. ISBN 87-7300-011-6.
