= Bjørn Brinck-Claussen =

Danish chess player (1942–2022)

Personal information
- Born: 29 January 1942 Copenhagen, Denmark
- Died: 16 November 2022 (aged 80)

Chess career
- Country: Denmark
- Title: International Master (1986)
- Peak rating: 2425 (July 1971)

Bjørn Brinck-Claussen (29 January 1942 – 16 November 2022) was a Danish chess International Master (IM) (1986), three-times Danish Chess Championship winner (1966, 1970, 1977), Chess Olympiad individual silver medal winner (1962).

== Biography ==
In the 1960s and 1970s, Bjørn Brinck-Claussen was one of the strongest Danish chess players after chess grandmaster Bent Larsen. Three times he won Danish Chess Championships: 1966, 1970, and 1977. In 1962/63, he won Hastings International Chess Congress B tournament. In 1963, he won Nordic Chess Championship. In 1986, he was awarded the FIDE International Master (IM) title. In 1996, he shared first place in Copenhagen City Chess Championship.

Bjørn Brinck-Claussen played for Denmark in the Chess Olympiads:

- In 1962, at second reserve board in the 15th Chess Olympiad in Varna (+8, =2, -2) and won individual silver medal,
- In 1964, at third board in the 16th Chess Olympiad in Tel Aviv (+7, =5, -2),
- In 1966, at second board in the 17th Chess Olympiad in Havana (+5, =4, -8),
- In 1968, at second board in the 18th Chess Olympiad in Lugano (+4, =6, -4),
- In 1984, at first reserve board in the 26th Chess Olympiad in Thessaloniki (+3, =5, -3),
- In 1990, at second reserve board in the 29th Chess Olympiad in Novi Sad (+1, =3, -2).

Brinck-Claussen played for Denmark in the European Team Chess Championship:

- In 1983, at first reserve board in the 8th European Team Chess Championship in Plovdiv (+1, =1, -2).

Brinck-Claussen also played six times for Denmark in the World Student Team Chess Championships (1961-1962, 1964, 1966–1968) and won bronze medal in team competition (1966).

Brinck-Claussen died on 16 November 2022, at the age of 80.
