= Darrian Robinson =

American chess player (born 1994)

Personal information
- Born: 1994 (age 31–32) Brooklyn, New York

Chess career
- Country: United States
- Title: USCF Candidate Master
- FIDE rating: 1958 (August 2016)
- Peak rating: 2035 (April 2014)

Darrian Robinson (born 1994) is an American chess player. As of 2014, she was the highest rated African American female player in the United States Chess Federation system. She holds the USCF title of Candidate Master (August 2012) and her most recent USCF rating is 2086 (September 2016).

Darrian's chess career became notable in 2006, when she ranked 6th in USCF's girls under 13 ranking and represented the United States in Batumi, Georgia, at the World Youth Chess Championship. According to a New York Times article, the 2006 World Youth Chess Championship was the first time that two African-American players represented the United States in the tournament.

Robinson graduated from the University of Chicago in 2016. During her tenure there she held a White House Internship, studied at the London School of Economics, and worked at Hillary Clinton’s Iowa campaign headquarters in Des Moines.
