= Danish Chess Championship =

Annual chess tournament in Denmark

The Danish Chess Championship was organised by the Danish Chess Union (DSU) and first held in 1910. A masterclass was first introduced in 1915. But it is only from 1922 that the title of Danish chess champion was introduced, this was the first year also players from Copenhagen joined.

== History ==
In 1949, Poul Hage and Bjørn Nielsen were equal, but Nielsen died before the play-off. In 1950 Hage finished equal with Jens Enevoldsen, but this time the winner was decided by toss up.

The 1997 Championship was a ten-player single round-robin tournament held in Esbjerg from 22 to 30 March. The field included six Grandmasters, and the tournament average Elo rating was 2487 making it FIDE category 10. Lars Bo Hansen won with 6.0/9, and was the only player to not lose a game. Tied for second at 5.5 were Curt Hansen, Bent Larsen, and Peter Heine Nielsen. The four top finishers were all GMs.

The 1999 Championship was a ten-player single round-robin tournament held in Aarhus starting on 27 March. Peter Heine Nielsen and Sune Berg Hansen tied at 6.5/9, with Nielsen winning the championship on tie-break.

The 2000 Championship began as a ten-player single round-robin tournament, but 65-year-old former champion Bent Larsen was forced to withdraw due to ill health, and his completed games were not counted in the tournament results. The 15–24 April championship in Aalborg was won by Curt Hansen 6.0/8 a half point ahead of Peter Heine Nielsen. Both completed the tournament without a loss, but Hansen had one more win.

The 2001 Championship was a ten-player single round-robin tournament held in Nyborg from 7–16 April. Tournament favorite Peter Heine Nielsen won 7.0/9.

The 2002 Championship was a ten-player single round-robin tournament held in Greve from 23 to 31 March. Sune Berg Hansen won 6.5/9.

The 2003 Championship was a ten-player single round-robin tournament held in Horsens from 12 to 20 April. Tournament favorite Peter Heine Nielsen won 7.0/9, a half point ahead of Palo Davor in second place.

The 2004 Championship was a 16-player single-elimination tournament held in Køge, 4–12 April. Steffen Pedersen defeated Henrik El Kher in the final to win the championship.

The 2005 Championship was a 16-player single-elimination tournament held in Køge, 20–28 March. Sune Berg Hansen defeated Curt Hansen 2.5–1.5 in the final to win the championship.

The 2006 Championship, held 8–17 April in Aalborg, was organized as a ten-player single round-robin Gladiator Chess event in which only games won would count. In order to reduce the number of draws, any drawn games were replayed at with colors reversed at rapid time controls of 25 minutes + 10 seconds per move. A series of draws would be replayed with colors reversed each time at blitz speed, 10 minutes + 5 seconds per move until a decisive result was achieved. The use of the gladiator scoring did not affect the top two finishes in the championship. Sune Berg Hansen placed first and Nicolai Vesterbaek Pedersen second in a field of ten.

The 2007 Championship was a 24-player, 9-round Swiss system tournament held in Aalborg, 31 March–8 April. Sune Berg Hansen defended his title winning for the third consecutive time (four championships overall), 6.5/9. As part of a four-way tie for second with 6 points, FM Allan Stig Rasmussen missed earning his second grandmaster norm by only a half point.

The 2008 Championship was a 20-player, 9-round Swiss held in Silkeborg, 15–23 March. Peter Heine Nielsen won scoring 7 points in the first championship he had entered in five years. Lars Schandorff was second with 6 points. Defending champion Sune Berg Hansen shared third with 5½.

== Winners ==
Year	City	Winner
1910	Randers	Johannes Kruse
1911	Odense	Gyde Jørgensen
1912	Lemvig	M. Weye
1913	Slagelse	Age Kier
1914	Aarhus	Axel Salskov
1915	Horsens	Johannes Giersing
1916	Copenhagen	J. Juhl
1917	Grenaa	Egil Jacobsen
1918	Nykøbing	Liss Olof Karlsson
1919	Middelfart	Frederik Immanuel Weilbach
1920	Aalborg	Johannes Petersen; Hans Denver
1921	Roskilde	F. Thomsen
1922	Copenhagen	Egil Jacobsen
1923	Copenhagen	Erik Andersen
1924	Randers	Age Kier
1925	Aarhus	Erik Andersen
1926	Sønderborg	Erik Andersen
1927	Vordingborg	Erik Andersen
1928	Horsens	Jacob Erhard Wihjelm Gemzøe
1929	Copenhagen	Erik Andersen
1930	Svendborg	Erik Andersen
1931	Frederikshavn	Erik Andersen
1932	Esbjerg	Erik Andersen
1933	Nakskov	Erik Andersen
1934	Vejle	Erik Andersen
1935	Copenhagen	Erik Andersen
1936	Herning	Erik Andersen
1937	Odense	Poul Hage
1938	Aalborg	Poul Hage
1939	Naestved	Holger Norman-Hansen
1940	Randers	Jens Enevoldsen
1941	Copenhagen	Bjørn Nielsen
1942	Nørresundby	Bjørn Nielsen
1943	Helsingør	Jens Enevoldsen
1944	Odense	Bjørn Nielsen
1945	Odense	Christian Poulsen
1946	Nykøbing	Bjørn Nielsen
1947	Esbjerg	Jens Enevoldsen
1948	Aarhus	Jens Enevoldsen
1949	Copenhagen	Poul Hage
1950	Aalborg	Poul Hage
1951	Odense	Eigil Pedersen
1952	Herning	Christian Poulsen
1953	Horsens	Eigil Pedersen
1954	Aarhus	Bent Larsen
1955	Aalborg	Bent Larsen
1956	Copenhagen	Bent Larsen
1957	Odense	Palle Ravn
1958	Herning	Børge Andersen
1959	Aarhus	Bent Larsen
1960	Aalborg	Jens Enevoldsen
1961	Nykøbing	Eigil Pedersen
1962	Copenhagen	Bent Kølvig
1963	Odense	Bent Larsen
1964	Holstebro	Bent Larsen
1965	Aalborg	Sejer Holm
1966	Aarhus	Bjørn Brinck-Claussen
1967	Vejle	Børge Andersen
1968	Copenhagen	Børge Andersen
1969	Odense	Ole Jakobsen
1970	Flensborg	Bjørn Brinck-Claussen
1971	Hjørring	Ole Jakobsen
1972	Esbjerg	Svend Hamann
1973	Copenhagen	Børge Andersen
1974	Vejle	Ulrik Rath
1975	Odense	Gert Iskov
1976	Aarhus	Bo Jacobsen
1977	Copenhagen	Bjørn Brinck-Claussen
1978	Horsens	Carsten Høi
1979	Aalborg	Jens Kristiansen
1980	Odense	Ole Jakobsen
1981	Aarhus	Erling Mortensen
1982	Vejle	Jens Kristiansen
1983	Copenhagen	Curt Hansen
1984	Aalborg	Curt Hansen
1985	Naestved	Curt Hansen
1986	Esbjerg	Carsten Høi
1987	Holstebro	Erling Mortensen
1988	Odense	Lars Schandorff
1989	Aalborg	Erling Mortensen
1990	Randers	Erik Pedersen
1991	Lyngby	Erling Mortensen
1992	Aarhus	Carsten Høi
1993	Tønder	Lars Bo Hansen
1994	Aalborg	Curt Hansen
1995	Ringsted	Jens Kristiansen
1996	Randers	Peter Heine Nielsen
1997	Esbjerg	Lars Bo Hansen
1998	Taastrup	Curt Hansen
1999	Aarhus	Peter Heine Nielsen
2000	Aalborg	Curt Hansen
2001	Nyborg	Peter Heine Nielsen
2002	Greve	Sune Berg Hansen
2003	Horsens	Peter Heine Nielsen
2004	Køge	Steffen Pedersen
2005	Køge	Sune Berg Hansen
2006	Aalborg	Sune Berg Hansen
2007	Aalborg	Sune Berg Hansen
2008	Silkeborg	Peter Heine Nielsen
2009	Silkeborg	Sune Berg Hansen
2010	Hillerød	Allan Stig Rasmussen
2011	Odense	Allan Stig Rasmussen
2012	Helsingør	Sune Berg Hansen
2013	Helsingør	Davor Palo
2014	Skørping	Allan Stig Rasmussen
2015	Svendborg	Sune Berg Hansen
2016	Svendborg	Mads Andersen
2017	Skørping	Mads Andersen
2018	Svendborg	Bjørn Møller Ochsner
2019	Svendborg	Allan Stig Rasmussen
2020	Svendborg	Mads Andersen
2021	Svendborg	Allan Stig Rasmussen
2022	Svendborg	Martin Haubro
2023	Svendborg	Boris Chatalbashev
2024	Svendborg	Boris Chatalbashev
2025	Svendborg	Jesper Søndergaard Thybo
2026	Svendborg	Bjørn Møller Ochsner
