= Bent Kølvig =

Danish chess player

Personal information
- Born: 28 April 1938 (age 88)

Chess career
- Country: Denmark

Bent Kølvig (born 28 April 1938), is a Danish chess player, Danish Chess Championship winner (1962).

== Biography ==
In the 1960s Bent Kølvig was one of Danish leading chess players. He participated many times in the finals of Danish Chess Championships and won this tournament in 1962.

Bent Kølvig played for Denmark in the Chess Olympiads:

- In 1960, at second board in the 14th Chess Olympiad in Leipzig (+6, =6, -5),
- In 1962, at first board in the 15th Chess Olympiad in Varna (+5, =5, -6),
- In 1964, at second board in the 16th Chess Olympiad in Tel Aviv (+4, =3, -5).

Bent Kølvig played for Denmark in the European Team Chess Championship preliminaries:

- In 1970, at eighth board in the 4th European Team Chess Championship preliminaries (+1, =0, -0).
