= Johannes Giersing =

Danish chess player

Personal information
- Born: Johannes Hjalmar Giersing; 18 November 1872 Odense
- Died: 11 November 1954 (aged 81) Copenhagen

Chess career
- Country: Denmark

Johannes Hjalmar Giersing (18 November 1872, Odense – 11 November 1954, Copenhagen) was a Danish chess master.

At the beginning of his career, he tied for 4-5th in Copenhagen 1895 (Andreas Rosendahl won). Giersing played several times in Nordic Chess Championship, and won at Kristiania (now Oslo) 1903 (4th Nord-ch). He also took 6th at Copenhagen 1899 (2nd Nord-ch, Jörgen Möller won); tied for 5-6th at Göteborg 1901 (3rd Nord-ch, Möller won); took 10th at Stockholm 1906 (Ossip Bernstein and Carl Schlechter won), took 10th at Stockholm 1912 (8th Nord-ch, Alexander Alekhine won), tied for 6-7th at Copenhagen 1916 (9th Nord-ch, Paul Johner won), took 5th at Kristiania 1917 (10th Nord-ch, Gustaf Nyholm won), and took 11th at Copenhagen 1924 (12th Nord-ch, Aron Nimzowitsch won).

Giersing won the Danish Championship at Horsens 1915, won at Copenhagen 1918, and took 3rd at Aarhus 1925 (DEN-ch, Erik Andersen won).
