= Sune Berg Hansen =

Danish chess grandmaster (born 1971)

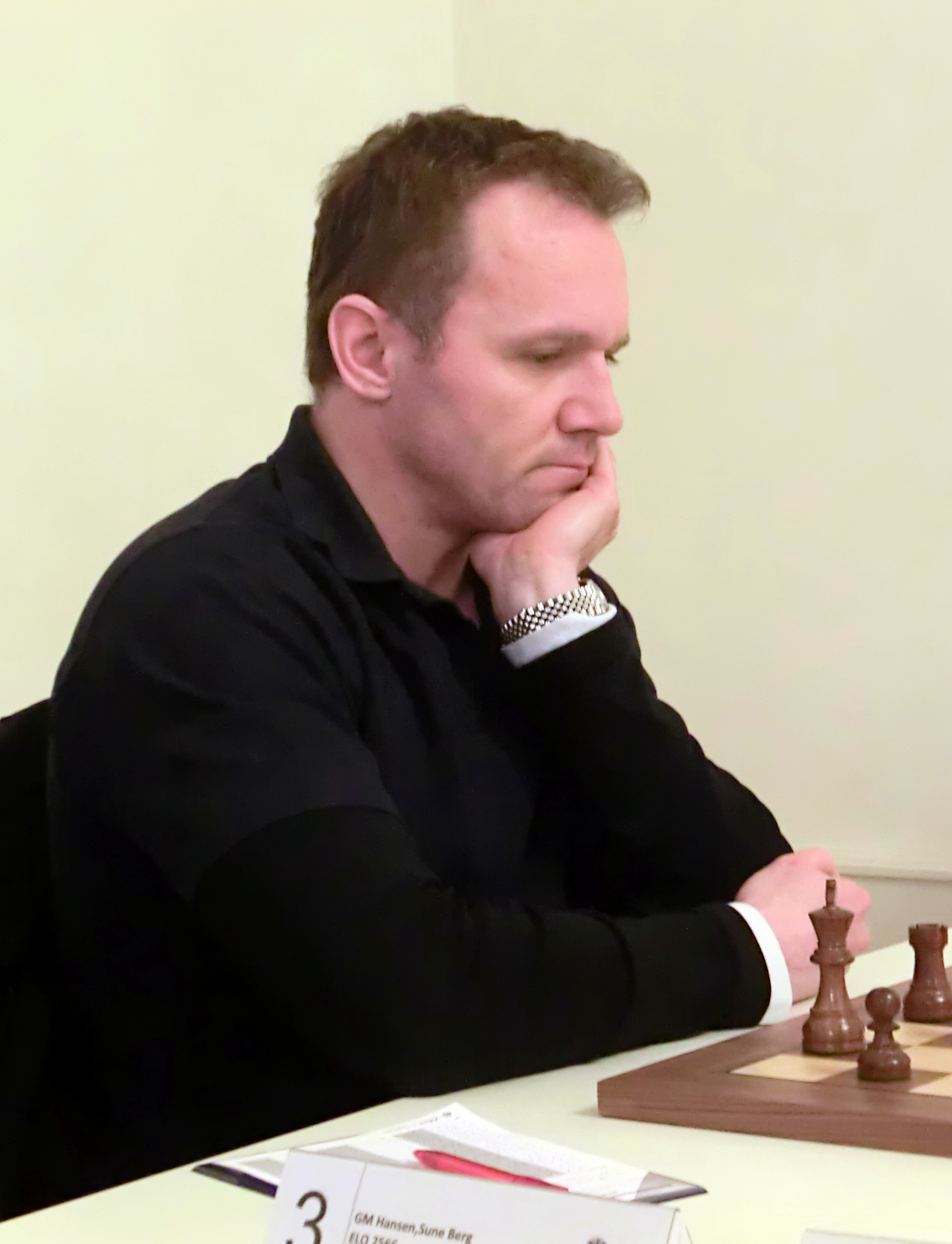
- Sune Berg Hansen, 2013

Personal information
- Born: 21 April 1971 (age 55) Gentofte, Denmark

Chess career
- Country: Denmark
- Title: Grandmaster (1998)
- FIDE rating: 2495 (September 2026)
- Peak rating: 2603 (November 2010)

Sune Berg Hansen (born 21 April 1971) is a Danish chess grandmaster. He is a seven-time Danish Chess Champion.

== Chess career ==
Hansen earned his international master title in 1993 and his grandmaster title in 1998. He has won the Danish Chess Championship on seven occasions: in 2002, 2005, 2006, 2007, 2009, 2012 and 2015. He has competed in eight Chess Olympiads: in 1994, 2000, 2002, 2004, 2006, 2010, 2012 and 2016. He has also competed in six European Team Chess Championships: in 2005, 2007, 2009, 2011, 2013 and 2015. As of September 2017, he has a rating of 2580, which makes him the No. 3 ranked Danish player.

== Personal life ==
Born in Gentofte, Hansen holds a cand.polit. from the University of Copenhagen and has been a professional poker player since 2005. He also works in the finance sector and writes a chess and poker column for the Danish newspaper Politiken. He founded the Danish PokerNet website, which was acquired by the RakeTech Group in 2017.
