= Allan Stig Rasmussen =

Danish chess grandmaster (born 1983)

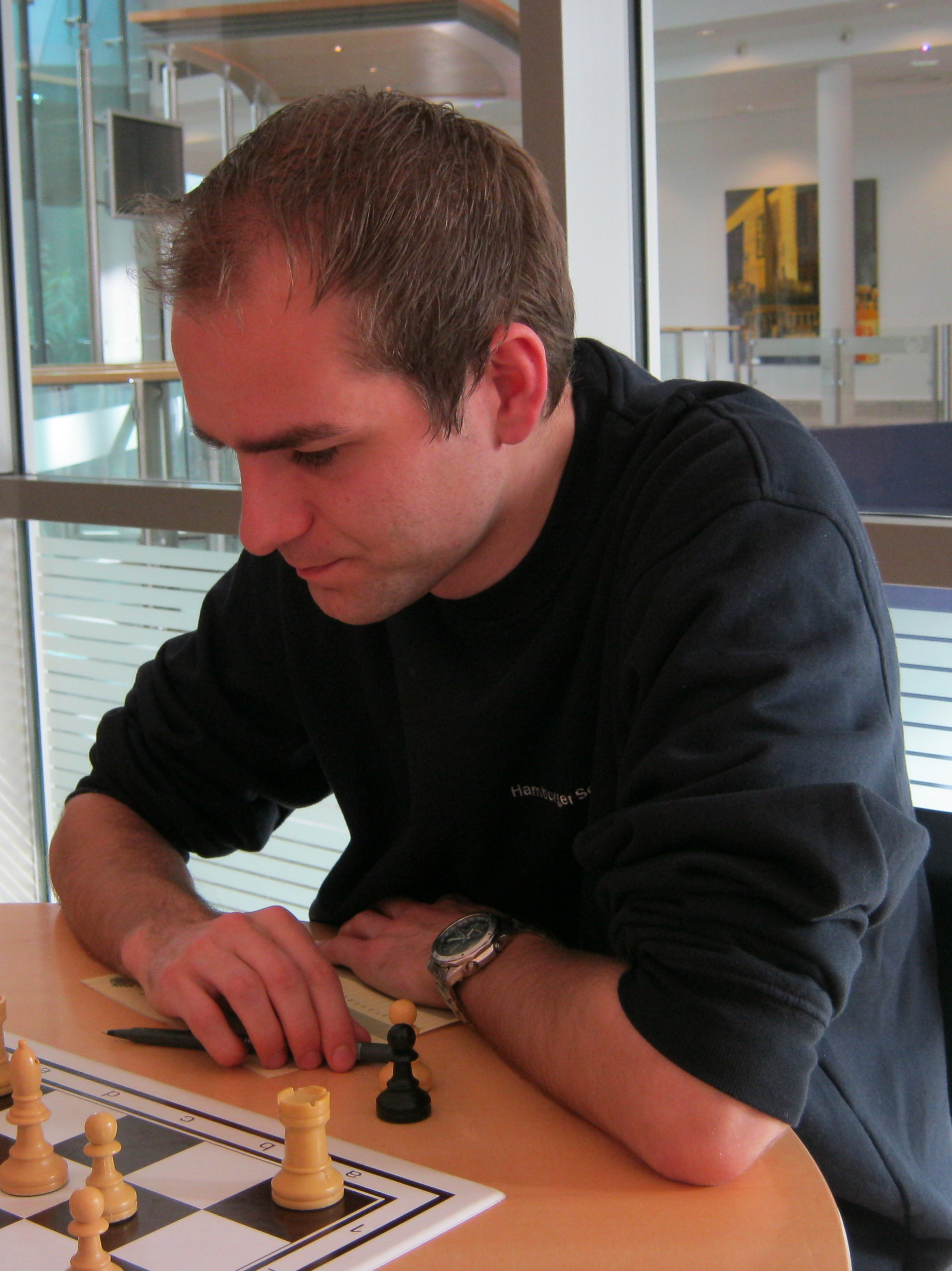
- Allan Stig Rasmussen, 2011

Personal information
- Born: 20 November 1983 (age 42) Aarhus, Denmark

Chess career
- Country: Denmark
- Title: Grandmaster (2009)
- FIDE rating: 2482 (July 2026)
- Peak rating: 2577 (November 2021)

Allan Stig Rasmussen (born 20 November 1983) is a Danish chess grandmaster. He is a four-time Danish Chess Champion.

== Chess career ==
Born in 1983, Rasmussen earned his international master title in 2008 and his grandmaster title in 2009. He has won the Danish Chess Championship in 2010, 2011, 2014 and 2019.
