= Carsten Høi =

Danish chess grandmaster

Personal information
- Born: 16 January 1957 (age 69) Copenhagen, Denmark

Chess career
- Country: Denmark
- Title: Grandmaster (2001)
- Peak rating: 2460 (January 1989)

Carsten Høi (born 16 January 1957, in Copenhagen) is a Danish chess Grandmaster.

He was awarded his International Master title in 1979 and his Grandmaster title in 2001. There was a mistake in the record-keeping: he should have been awarded his Grandmaster title in 1993. He has won the Danish Chess Championship three times, in 1978, 1986 and 1992. He has represented Denmark at the Chess Olympiads five times, in 1978, 1980, 1988, 1992 and 1996.

== Notable games and tournaments ==
- Høi v. Gulko, 1988 Chess Olympiad, Best Combination Prize
