= European Council for High Ability =

The European Council of High Ability (ECHA) was established in 1988 as a European non-governmental organization. The major aim of ECHA is to promote the information exchange of people interested in high ability – teachers, researchers, psychologists, parents, politicians and the highly able themselves. ECHA has the charity number: 40146782. ECHA has both personal and organizational membership.

The services of the European Council for High Ability are the following:

- The newspaper, ECHA News, for its members published twice a year.
- The scientific journal High Ability Studies, published by Taylor & Francis twice a year given to full members free.
- ECHA training: courses for teachers and experts dealing with the highly able leading to the ECHA diploma "ECHA specialist in Gifted Education".
- ECHA conferences: ECHA organizes biannual conferences.
- European Talent Support Network: the 2014 General Assembly of ECHA decided to support the formation of a European Talent Support Network having European Talent Centres as hubs and European Talent Points as nodes. The first European Talent Centres were accredited in 2015. In 2018 the organization had more than 300 cooperating Talent Points in 39 countries of many continents.

ECHA is directed by a general assembly convening annually. The general assembly elects the general committee responsible for ECHA's life in between two general assemblies. Members in different countries are helped by national correspondents. Past-presidents, past-secretaries and past-editor-in-chiefs of High Ability Studies are honorary members of ECHA.
