= Henrik Danielsen =

Danish-Icelandic chess grandmaster (born 1966)

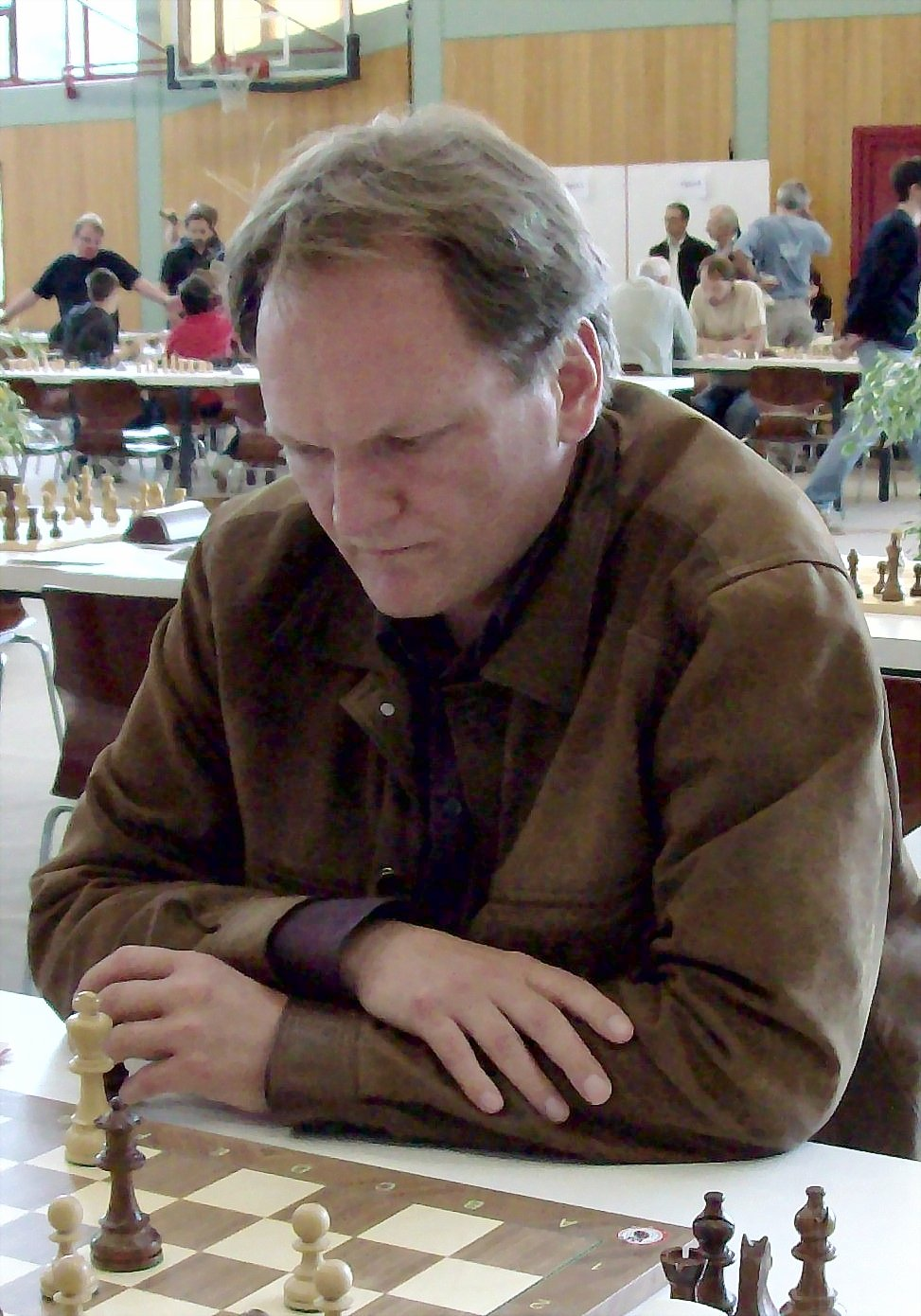
- Henrik Danielsen, 2008

Personal information
- Born: 23 January 1966 (age 60) Nykøbing Falster, Denmark

Chess career
- Country: Denmark (until 2006); Iceland (since 2006)
- Title: Grandmaster (1996)
- FIDE rating: 2466 (August 2026)
- Peak rating: 2545 (May 2011)

Henrik Danielsen (born 23 January 1966) is a Danish-Icelandic chess grandmaster. He is the Icelandic Chess Champion in 2009.

== Chess career ==
Born in 1966, Danielsen earned his grandmaster title in 1996. In 1993, he finished joint first in the Politiken Cup with Igor Khenkin and John Emms on a score of 7½/10. He has played in six Chess Olympiads: the first three for Denmark (1992, 1994 and 1996) and the rest for Iceland (2006, 2008 and 2012). He is the No. 4 ranked Icelandic player as of September 2020.

He regularly plays the Bird's Opening and has authored a book, entitled The Complete Polar Bear System (2016), on the opening.
