= Erik Andersen (chess player) =

Danish chess player (1904–1938)

Personal information
- Born: Erik Andersen; 10 April 1904 Gentofte
- Died: 27 February 1938 (aged 33) Copenhagen

Chess career
- Country: Denmark

Erik Andersen (10 April 1904, Gentofte – 27 February 1938, Copenhagen) was a Danish chess master.

He was twelve-times Danish Champion (1923, 1925, 1926, 1927, 1929, 1930, 1931, 1932, 1933, 1934, 1935, and 1936). He won the Nordic Championship at Stockholm 1930, defended his title with 3 : 3 against Gideon Ståhlberg in 1934, and lost it by 2,5 : 3,5 against Erik Lundin in 1937.

In tournaments, he took 6th in Copenhagen in 1923 (Aron Nimzowitsch won). In 1924, he took 3rd in Copenhagen (Johannes Giersing and Kinch won), and took 2nd in Randers (Kier won). In 1927, he tied for 4–5th in Copenhagen (Géza Maróczy won). In 1928, he took 4th in Copenhagen (Nimzowitsch won). In 1929, he tied for 5–6th in Göteborg (Nordic-ch; Ståhlberg won). In 1930, he tied for 4–5th in Swinemünde (Friedrich Sämisch won). In 1931, he lost a match by 1,5 : 4,5 to Gösta Stoltz.

In 1933, he tied for 3rd-5th in Copenhagen (Nimzowitsch won). In 1935, he tied for 8–9th in Bad Nauheim (Efim Bogoljubow won). In 1937, he took 13th in Jurata (4th POL-ch; Savielly Tartakower won).

Andersen played for Denmark six-times in official Chess Olympiads and once in 3rd unofficial Chess Olympiad at Munich 1936.

- In 1927, at third board in 1st Chess Olympiad in London (+8 –3 =4);
- In 1928, at second board in 2nd Chess Olympiad in The Hague (+9 –4 =3);
- In 1930, at first board in 3rd Chess Olympiad in Hamburg (+9 –5 =3);
- In 1931, at first board in 4th Chess Olympiad in Prague (+4 –8 =4);
- In 1933, at first board in 5th Chess Olympiad in Folkestone (+3 –4 =6);
- In 1935, at first board in 6th Chess Olympiad in Warsaw (+7 –10 =1);
- In 1936, at first board in 3rd unofficial Chess Olympiad in Munich (+6 –7 =6).

He won team silver medal at London 1927.
