= Lars Bo Hansen =

Danish chess grandmaster (born 1968)

Personal information
- Born: 24 September 1968 (age 58) Nykøbing Falster, Denmark

Chess career
- Country: Denmark
- Title: Grandmaster (1990)
- FIDE rating: 2560 (November 2026)
- Peak rating: 2586 (July 2001)

Lars Bo Hansen (born 24 September 1968 in Nykøbing Falster) is a Danish chess player. He was the third Dane to be awarded the title of Grandmaster.

== Biography ==
Hansen studied economics at Copenhagen Business School, graduating with an MBA. He worked as an assistant professor, first at CEUS Handelshøjskolecenter in Nykøbing Falster, then at the Department of Management and Strategy at the University of Southern Denmark in Slagelse, and later at the Florida Institute of Technology in Melbourne, Florida.

He is married to chess player Evgenia Peicheva-Hansen (WIM, born 1968), whom he met at the 1988 World Junior Chess Championship in Adelaide. Their son Martin (born 1990) has also achieved an Elo rating of over 2100. In April 2009, Hansen became coach of the Danish national chess team.

== Chess career ==
In 1990, Hansen won the Liechtenstein Open. In 1993/94, he finished first at the Rilton Cup in Stockholm. He won the Danish Chess Championship in 1993 and 1997, and won the Copenhagen Open (Politiken Cup) in 1995 and 2000.

Hansen represented Denmark in six Chess Olympiads: on board 2 in 1988 and 1990, on board 1 in 1994 and 2008, and on board 3 in 2000 and 2006. At the 1990 Olympiad in Novi Sad, he won an individual bronze medal for scoring 8 out of 11 points. His overall Chess Olympiad record is +22 =31 −10 (22 wins, 31 draws, and 10 losses). Between 1992 and 2009, he also competed in four European Team Chess Championships.

In Germany, he played for Lübecker SV, winning the Chess Bundesliga in 2001, 2002, and 2003. In Denmark, he won the national team championship with SK 34 Nykøbing in 1999 and 2000. With SK 34 Nykøbing, Hansen also participated in the 1999 European Chess Club Cup, scoring 2.5 points out of 3 games on top board in the preliminary round, though his team did not advance.

He was awarded the International Master title in 1987 and the Grandmaster title in 1990. As of December 2021, his Elo rating was 2560, which would place him sixth on the Danish rating list; however, he is listed as inactive by FIDE, having not played a rated game since the 23rd Space Coast Open in April 2016 in Cocoa Beach. His peak rating was 2586, held from July 2001 to June 2002.

== Publications ==
- Foundations of Chess Strategy. Gambit Publications, London 2005; ISBN 1-904600-26-3.
- Secrets of Chess Endgame Strategy: Applying Business Methods to Chess Preparation and Training. Gambit Publications, London 2006; ISBN 1-904600-44-1.
- How Chess Games are Won and Lost. Gambit Publications, London 2008; ISBN 978-1-906454-01-2.
- Improve Your Chess – by Learning from the Champions. Gambit Publications, London 2009; ISBN 978-1-906454-12-8.
