= Peter Heine Nielsen =

Danish chess grandmaster (born 1973)

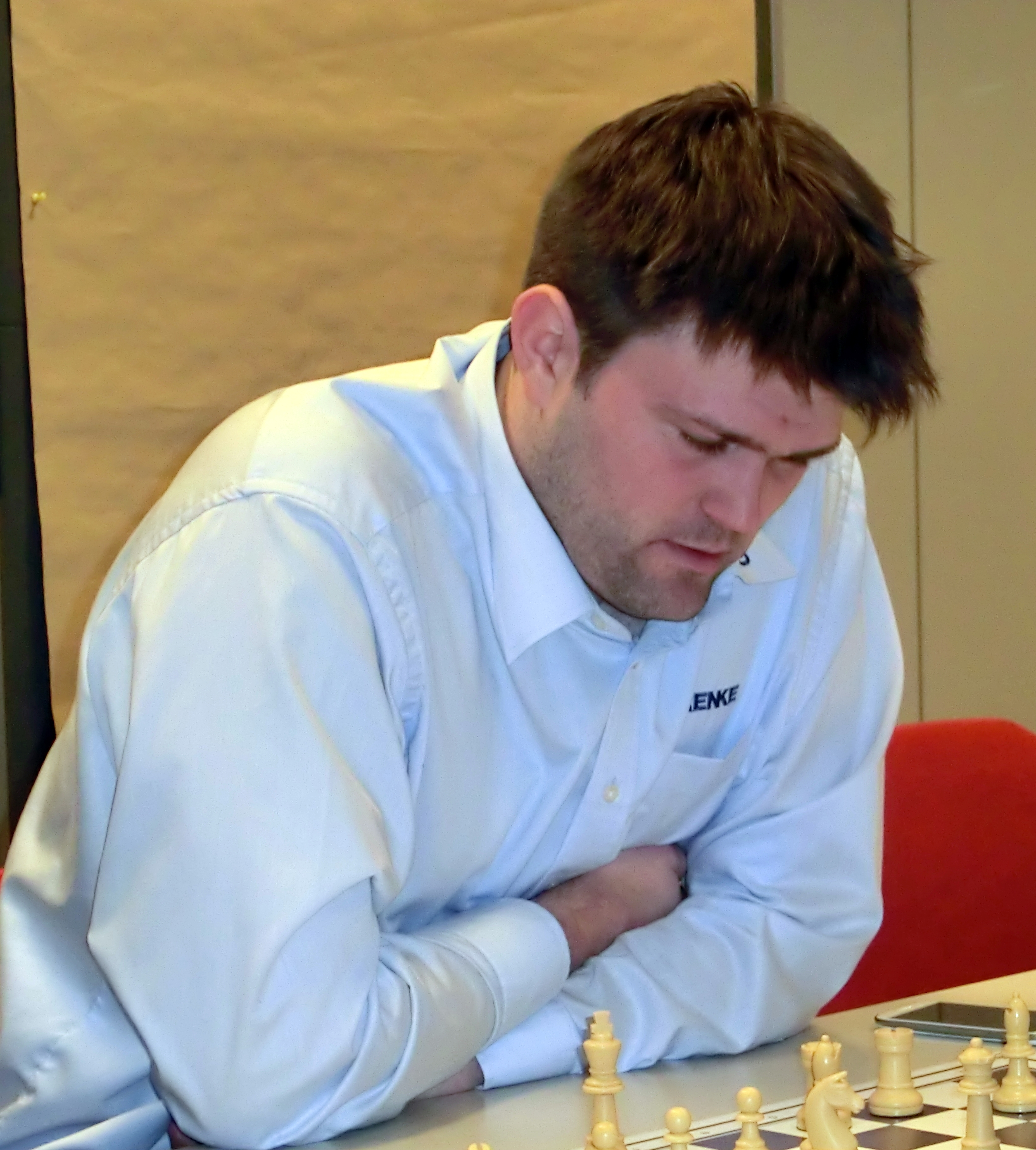
- Nielsen in 2014

Personal information
- Born: 24 May 1973 (age 53) Holstebro, Denmark
- Spouse: Viktorija Čmilytė (m. 2013)

Chess career
- Country: Denmark
- Title: Grandmaster (1994)
- FIDE rating: 2614 (September 2026)
- Peak rating: 2700 (July 2010)
- Peak ranking: No. 37 (January 2010)

Peter Heine Nielsen (born 24 May 1973) is a Danish chess trainer and player. He was awarded the title of Grandmaster by FIDE in 1994. He has won a record nine consecutive World Chess Championship titles as a coach, working with Viswanathan Anand in 2007, 2008, 2010, and 2012; then with Magnus Carlsen in 2013, 2014, 2016, 2018, and 2021.

== Chess career ==
Nielsen was awarded the title of International Master by FIDE in 1991 and that of Grandmaster in 1994. He won the Danish Chess Championship five times: in 1996, 1999, 2001, 2003, and 2008. He played for Denmark in seven Chess Olympiads, three times on top board, with an overall result of 60.1% (+24−10=35). He won an individual bronze medal on third board at Moscow 1994.

On January 30, 2004, he played against ChessBrain – which earned the world record as the largest distributed chess computer. The result was a draw.

By September 2005, Nielsen's Elo rating in the FIDE list was 2668, at the time the highest rating for any player from the Nordic countries.

== Coaching career ==
Nielsen coached World Champion Viswanathan Anand from 2002 until 2012. Anand won the World Championship title in Mexico 2007, and defended it in Bonn 2008, Sofia 2010 and Moscow 2012.

Nielsen has been coaching world number one, Magnus Carlsen, since 2013. Carlsen won the Candidates Tournament 2013, which gave him the right to challenge Anand for the world championship. He defeated Anand, and has since defended the title four times.

Nielsen had previously coached Carlsen in Khanty-Mansiysk 2005, where Carlsen became the youngest player ever to qualify for the Candidates' matches.

== Shogi ==
In 2012, Nielsen began playing shogi; he achieved the mark of 2 dan in May 2017. The same month, he won the Danish Shogi Championship. He represented Denmark at the International Shogi Forum in 2014 and 2017, reaching the final of Tournament B in 2017. He competed twice in the European Shogi Championship, finishing 18th in 2015 and 13th in 2017.

== Personal life ==
Nielsen lives in Lithuania with his wife, Viktorija Čmilytė-Nielsen, and four children. She is also a chess grandmaster, as well as a politician of the Liberal Movement.

== Notable games ==
Nielsen vs Danielsen, 1996

Position: f8 black rook, e7 black rook, f7 black queen, g7 black pawn, h7 black king, b6 black pawn, c6 black pawn, d6 black pawn, h6 black pawn, a5 black pawn, d5 white rook, e5 black knight, f5 black pawn, h5 white pawn, c4 white pawn, e4 black knight, h4 white knight, b3 white pawn, e3 white pawn, g3 white pawn, a2 white pawn, b2 white bishop, e2 white queen, f2 white pawn, d1 white rook, g1 white king

Position after 27...c6

Peter Nielsen vs. Henrik Danielsen, Danish Championship (playoff) 1996
1. c4 f5 2. Nc3 Nf6 3. d4 e6 4. Nf3 Bb4 5. Qb3 a5 6. g3 b6 7. Bg2 Bb7 8. 0-0 0-0 9. Rd1 Qc8 10. Qc2 Bxc3 11. Qxc3 d6 12. b3 Nbd7 13. Ne1 h6 14. Bb2 Bxg2 15. Nxg2 Qe8 16. Rac1 Qf7 17. Qc2 Ne4 18. Ba3 e5 19. dxe5 Nxe5 20. Bb2 Ng6 21. e3 Rae8 22. Qe2 Re7 23. Rd5 Kh7 24. Rcd1 Ng5 25. h4 Ne4 26. h5 Ne5 27. Nh4 c6 (diagram) 28. Rxd6 Ng4 Even after the best move 28...Nxd6, White is much better after 29.Rxd6 Kg8 30.Bxe5 Rxe5 31.Ng6 Re6 32.Rxe6 Qxe6 33.Nxf8 Kxf8 34.Qd3. Black's move is weaker and he loses quickly. 29. Rg6 Rg8 30. Rf1 Ng5 31. Qd3 Nh3+ 32. Kg2 Nhxf2 33. Rxf2 Rd7 34. Qc3 Nxf2 35. Kxf2 Qe6 36. Rxe6 1–0
