= Jens Kristiansen =

Danish chess grandmaster (born 1952)

Personal information
- Born: 25 May 1952 (age 74) Copenhagen, Denmark

Chess career
- Country: Denmark
- Title: Grandmaster (2012)
- Peak rating: 2480 (January 1987)

Jens Kristiansen (born 25 May 1952) is a Danish chess player. He earned the FIDE title of Grandmaster (GM) in 2012 by winning the World Seniors Chess Championship, prior to which he had been an International Master (IM) since 1979.

Born in Copenhagen, Kristiansen is a three-time national Danish champion (1979, 1982 and 1995) and has represented Denmark four times at the Chess Olympiads between 1978 and 1990. In 2013, Kristiansen shared first place with Anatoly Vaisser at the World Seniors Championship, taking the silver medal on tiebreak score.

== FIDE ratings ==
Elo development
View chart definition.
