= List of chess players =

This list of chess players includes people who are primarily known as chess players and have an article on the English Wikipedia.

== A ==
- Jacob Aagaard (Denmark, Scotland, born 1973)
- Manuel Aaron (India, born 1935)
- Nijat Abasov (Azerbaijan, born 1995)
- István Abonyi (Hungary, 1886–1942)
- Gerald Abrahams (England, 1907–1980)
- Tatev Abrahamyan (Armenia, US, born 1988)
- Hasan Abbasifar (Iran, born 1972)
- Farid Abbasov (Azerbaijan, born 1979)
- Jude Acers (US, born 1944)
- Péter Ács (Hungary, born 1981)
- Weaver Adams (US, 1901–1963)
- Tanitoluwa Adewumi (Nigeria, US, born 2010)
- Utut Adianto (Indonesia, born 1965)
- András Adorján (Hungary, 1950–2023)
- Vladimir Afromeev (Russia, born 1954)
- Simen Agdestein (Norway, born 1967)
- Evgeny Agrest (Belarus, Sweden, born 1966)
- Georgy Agzamov (Uzbekistan, 1954–1986)
- Carl Ahues (Germany, 1883–1968)
- James Macrae Aitken (Scotland, 1908–1983)
- Ralf Åkesson (Sweden, born 1961)
- Anna Akhsharumova (Russia, US, born 1957)
- Varuzhan Akobian (Armenia, US, born 1983)
- Vladimir Akopian (Armenia, born 1971)
- Mohammed Al-Modiahki (Qatar, born 1974)
- Semyon Alapin (Lithuania, 1856–1923)
- Vladimir Alatortsev (Russia, 1909–1987)
- Adolf Albin (Romania, 1848–1920)
- Lev Alburt (Russia, US, born 1945)
- Alexander Alekhine (Russia, France 1892–1946)
- Alexei Alekhine (Russia, 1888–1939)
- Grace Alekhine (US, England, France 1876–1956)
- Aleksej Aleksandrov (Belarus, born 1973)
- Kirill Alekseenko (Russia, born 1997)
- Evgeny Alekseev (Russia, born 1985)
- Hugh Alexander (England, 1899–1974)
- Aaron Alexandre (Germany, France, England 1765–1850)
- Nana Alexandria (Georgia, born 1949)
- Johann Baptist Allgaier (Germany, Austria, 1763–1823)
- Zoltán Almási (Hungary, born 1976)
- Izak Aloni (Poland, Israel, 1905–1985)
- Yoel Aloni (Israel, 1937–2019)
- Boris Alterman (Israel, born 1970)
- Friedrich Amelung (Estonia, Latvia, 1842–1909)
- Bassem Amin (Egypt, born 1988)
- Farrukh Amonatov (Tajikistan, born 1978)
- Bruce Amos (Canada, born 1946)
- An Yangfeng (China, born 1963)
- Viswanathan Anand (India, born 1969)
- Erik Andersen (Denmark, 1904–1938)
- Frank Anderson (Canada, 1928–1980)
- Hope Arthurine Anderson (Jamaica, 1950–2016)
- Adolf Anderssen (Germany, 1818–1879)
- Ulf Andersson (Sweden, born 1951)
- Dmitry Andreikin (Russia, born 1990)
- Zaven Andriasian (Armenia, born 1989)
- Dejan Antić (Serbia, born 1968)
- Rogelio Antonio Jr. (Philippines, born 1962)
- Vladimir Antoshin (Russia, 1929–1994)
- Oskar Antze (Germany, 1878–1962)
- Manuel Apicella (France, born 1970)
- Izaak Appel (Poland, 1905–1941)
- Fricis Apšenieks (Latvia, 1894–1941)
- Lev Aptekar (Ukraine, New Zealand, born 1936)
- José Joaquín Araiza (Mexico, 1900–1971)
- Ketevan Arakhamia-Grant (Georgia, born 1968)
- Mehrdad Ardeshi (Iran, born 1979)
- Walter Arencibia (Cuba, born 1967)
- Alexander Areshchenko (Ukraine, born 1986)
- Keith Arkell (England, born 1961)
- Romanas Arlauskas (Lithuania, Australia, 1917–2009)
- Jón Árnason (Iceland, born 1960)
- Dagur Arngrímsson (Iceland, born 1987)
- Levon Aronian (Armenia, born 1982)
- Lev Aronin (Russia, 1920–1983)
- Vladislav Artemiev (Russia, born 1998)
- Andreas Ascharin (Estonia, Latvia, 1843–1896)
- Jacob Ascher (England, Canada, 1841–1912)
- Konstantin Aseev (Russia, 1960–2004)
- Maurice Ashley (Jamaica, US, born 1966)
- Karen Asrian (Armenia, 1980–2008)
- Bibisara Assaubayeva (Kazakhstan, Russia, born 2004)
- Abu Bakr bin Yahya al-Suli (Abbasid Caliphate, c.880–946)
- Lajos Asztalos (Austria-Hungary, Yugoslavia, Hungary, 1889–1956)
- Ekaterina Atalik (Russia, Turkey, born 1982)
- Suat Atalık (Turkey, born 1964)
- Henry Atkins (England, 1872–1955)
- Arnold Aurbach (Poland, France, c.1888–1952)
- Yuri Averbakh (Russia, c.1922–2022)
- Valeriy Aveskulov (Ukraine, born 1986)
- Herbert Avram (US, 1913–2006)
- Boris Avrukh (Israel, born 1978)

== B ==
- Alexander Baburin (Russia, Ireland, born 1967)
- Étienne Bacrot (France, born 1983)
- Paul Baender (Germany, Bolivia, 1906–1985)
- Giorgi Bagaturov (Georgia, born 1964)
- Amir Bagheri (Iran, born 1978)
- Camilla Baginskaite (Soviet Union, Lithuania, US, born 1967)
- Vladimir Bagirov (USSR, Latvia, 1936–2000)
- Mary Bain (US, 1904–1972)
- David Graham Baird (US, 1854–1913)
- Vladimir Baklan (Ukraine, born 1978)
- Yuri Balashov (Russia, born 1949)
- Rosendo Balinas Jr. (Philippines, 1941–1998)
- Zoltán von Balla (Hungary, 1883–1945)
- Csaba Balogh (Hungary, born 1987)
- János Balogh (Romania, Hungary, 1892–1980)
- Julio Balparda (Uruguay, c. 1900–1942)
- Amikam Balshan (Israel, born 1948)
- Hristos Banikas (Greece, born 1978)
- Anatoly Bannik (Ukraine, 1921–2013)
- David Baramidze (Georgia, Germany, born 1988)
- Zsigmond Barász (Hungary, 1878–1935)
- Abraham Baratz (Romania, France, 1895–1975)
- Gerardo Barbero (Argentina, Hungary, 1961–2001)
- Oliver Barbosa (Philippines, born 1986)
- Gedeon Barcza (Hungary, 1911–1986)
- Olaf Barda (Norway, 1909–1971)
- Curt von Bardeleben (Germany, 1861–1924)
- Leonard Barden (England, born 1929)
- Evgeny Bareev (Russia, born 1966)
- Robert Henry Barnes (England, New Zealand 1849–1916)
- Thomas Wilson Barnes (England, 1825–1874)
- Alexei Barsov (Uzbekistan, born 1966)
- Mateusz Bartel (Poland, born 1985)
- John Bartholomew (US, born 1986)
- Dibyendu Barua (India, born 1966)
- Cerdas Barus (Indonesia, born 1961)
- Michael Basman (England, born 1946)
- Christian Bauer (France, born 1977)
- Johann Hermann Bauer (Bohemia, Austria, 1861–1891)
- Friedrich Baumbach (Germany, 1935–2025)
- Albert Becker (Austria, Germany, Argentina 1896–1984)
- Anjelina Belakovskaia (Ukraine, US, born 1969)
- Liudmila Belavenets (Russia, 1940–2021)
- Sergey Belavenets (Russia, 1910–1942)
- Dina Belenkaya (Russia, Israel, born 1993)
- Alexander Beliavsky (Ukraine, Slovenia, born 1953)
- Slim Belkhodja (Tunisia, born 1962)
- Jana Bellin (Czechoslovakia, England, born 1947)
- Zdzisław Belsitzmann (Poland, c. 1890–1920)
- Levi Benima (Netherlands, 1837–1922)
- Clarice Benini (Italy, 1905–1976)
- Joel Benjamin (US, born 1964)
- Francisco Benkö (Germany, Argentina, 1910–2010)
- Pal Benko (France, Hungary, US, 1928–2019)
- Dávid Bérczes (Hungary, born 1990)
- Emanuel Berg (Sweden, born 1981)
- Béla Berger (Hungary, Australia, 1931–2005)
- Johann Berger (Austria, 1845–1933)
- Victor Buerger (Ukraine, England, 1904–1996)
- Nils Bergkvist (Sweden, 1900–?)
- Teodors Bergs (Latvia, 1902–1966)
- Hans Berliner (Germany, US, 1929–2017)
- Ivar Bern (Norway, born 1967)
- Karl Berndtsson (Sweden, 1892–1943)
- Jacob Bernstein (US, 1885–1959)
- Ossip Bernstein (Ukraine, France, 1882–1962)
- Sidney Norman Bernstein (US, 1911–1992)
- Mario Bertok (Croatia, 1929–2008)
- Katarina Beskow (Sweden, 1867–1939)
- Louis Betbeder Matibet (France, 1901–1986)
- Kārlis Bētiņš (Latvia, 1867–1943)
- Siegmund Beutum (Austria, 1890–1966)
- Vinay Bhat (US, born 1984)
- Carlos Bielicki (Argentina, born 1940)
- Martin Bier (Germany, 1854–1934)
- Horace Bigelow (US, 1898–1980)
- István Bilek (Hungary, 1932–2010)
- Paul Rudolf von Bilguer (Germany, 1815–1840)
- Maurice Billecard (France, 1876–?)
- Reefat Bin-Sattar (Bangladesh, born 1974)
- Henry Bird (England, 1830–1908)
- Nathan Birnboim (Israel, born 1950)
- Klaus Bischoff (Germany, born 1961)
- Arthur Bisguier (US, 1929–2017)
- Peter Biyiasas (Greece, Canada, born 1950)
- Dimitrije Bjelica (Serbia, born 1935)
- Roy Turnbull Black (US, 1888–1962)
- Joseph Henry Blackburne (England, 1841–1924)
- Armand Blackmar (US, 1826–1888)
- Joseph Henry Blake (England, 1859–1951)
- Abram Blass (Poland, Israel, 1895–1971)
- Ottó Bláthy (Hungary, 1860–1939)
- Max Blau (Germany, Switzerland, 1918–1984)
- Ludwig Bledow (Germany, 1795–1846)
- Paweł Blehm (Poland, born 1980)
- Dirk Bleijkmans (Netherlands, Indonesia, 1875–?)
- Yaacov Bleiman (Lithuania, Israel, 1947–2004)
- Calvin Blocker (US, born 1955)
- Claude Bloodgood (US, 1937–2001)
- Oscar Blum (Lithuania, France, born before 1910)
- Benjamin Blumenfeld (Belarus, Russia, 1884–1947)
- Max Blümich (Germany, 1886–1942)
- Boris Blumin (Russia, Canada, US, 1907–1998)
- Milko Bobotsov (Bulgaria, 1931–2000)
- Dmitry Bocharov (Russia, born 1982)
- Samuel Boden (England, 1826–1882)
- Fedor Bogatyrchuk (Ukraine, Canada, 1892–1984)
- Efim Bogoljubow (Ukraine, Germany, 1889–1952)
- Paolo Boi (Italy, 1528–1598)
- Jacobo Bolbochán (Argentina, 1906–1984)
- Julio Bolbochán (Argentina, 1920–1996)
- Isaac Boleslavsky (Ukraine, Russia, Belarus, 1919–1977)
- Victor Bologan (Moldova, born 1971)
- Igor Bondarevsky (Russia, 1913–1979)
- Eero Böök (Finland, 1910–1990)
- Valentina Borisenko (Russia, 1920–1993)
- Olexandr Bortnyk (Ukraine, born 1996)
- Alexandra Botez (US, Canada, born 1995)
- Andrea Botez (US, Canada, born 2002)
- Tea Bosboom-Lanchava (Netherlands, Georgia, born 1974)
- George Botterill (England, Wales, born 1949)
- Mikhail Botvinnik (Russia, 1911–1995)
- Louis-Charles Mahé de La Bourdonnais (France, 1795–1840)
- César Boutteville (Vietnam, France, 1917–2015)
- Olena Boytsun (Ukraine, born 1983)
- Julius Brach (Czechoslovakia, 1881–1938)
- Gyula Breyer (Hungary, 1893–1921)
- Alfred Brinckmann (Germany, 1891–1967)
- Mirko Bröder (Hungary, Serbia, 1911–1943)
- Miklós Bródy (Hungary, Romania, 1877–1949)
- Vladimir Bron (Ukraine, 1909–1985)
- David Bronstein (Ukraine, 1924–2006)
- Walter Browne (Australia, US, 1949–2015)
- Agnieszka Brustman (Poland, born 1962)
- Lázaro Bruzón (Cuba, born 1982)
- Stellan Brynell (Sweden, born 1962)
- Bu Xiangzhi (China, born 1985)
- Henry Thomas Buckle (England, 1821–1862)
- Gerardo Budowski (Germany, France, Venezuela, Costa Rica, 1925–2014)
- Wincenty Budzyński (Poland, France, 1815–1866)
- Nataliya Buksa (Ukraine, born 1996)
- Constant Ferdinand Burille (France, US, 1866–1914)
- Amos Burn (England, 1848–1925)
- Algimantas Butnorius (Lithuania, 1946–2017)
- Elisabeth Bykova (Russia, 1913–1989)
- Donald Byrne (US, 1930–1976)
- Robert Byrne (US, 1928–2013)
- Bhupendra Niraula (Nepal, born 1981)

== C ==
- Kler Çaku (Albania, born 2010)
- Florencio Campomanes (Philippines, 1927–2010)
- Daniel Cámpora (Argentina, born 1957)
- Esteban Canal (Peru, Italy, 1896–1981)
- Arianne Caoili (Australia, 1986–2020)
- José Raúl Capablanca (Cuba, 1888–1942)
- Rodolfo Tan Cardoso (Philippines, 1937–2013)
- Ruth Cardoso (Brazil, 1934–2000)
- Carl Carls (Germany, 1880–1958)
- Magnus Carlsen (Norway, born 1990)
- Pontus Carlsson (Sweden, born 1982)
- Horatio Caro (England, Germany, 1862–1920)
- Berna Carrasco (Chile, 1914–2013)
- Pietro Carrera (Sicily, 1573–1647)
- Fabiano Caruana (Dual citizenship: US and Italy, born 1992)
- Vincenzo Castaldi (Italy, 1916–1970)
- Mariano Castillo (Chile, 1905–1970)
- Mišo Cebalo (Croatia, born 1945)
- Giovanni Cenni (Italy, 1881–1957)
- Alfonso Ceron (Spain, 1535–?)
- Oscar Chajes (Ukraine, Austria, US, 1873–1928)
- Ferenc Chalupetzky (Hungary, 1886–1951)
- Edward Chamier (England, France, 1840–1892)
- Chan Peng Kong (Singapore, born 1956)
- Sandipan Chanda (India, born 1983)
- Chang Tung Lo (China, born before 1960)
- Murray Chandler (New Zealand, England, born 1960)
- Pascal Charbonneau (Canada, born 1983)
- Rudolf Charousek (Hungary, 1873–1900)
- Chantal Chaudé de Silans (France, 1919–2001)
- Valery Chekhov (Russia, born 1955)
- Vitaly Chekhover (Russia, 1908–1965)
- Chen De (China, born 1949)
- Ivan Cheparinov (Bulgaria, born 1986)
- Alexander Cherepkov (Russia, 1920–2009)
- Irving Chernev (Russia, US, 1900–1981)
- Tykhon Cherniaiev (Ukraine, born 2010)
- Alexander Chernin (Ukraine, Hungary, born 1960)
- Konstantin Chernyshov (Russia, born 1967)
- André Chéron (France, 1895–1980)
- Maia Chiburdanidze (Georgia, born 1961)
- Mikhail Chigorin (Russia, 1850–1908)
- Larry Christiansen (US, born 1956)
- Vladimir Chuchelov (Russia, Belgium, born 1969)
- Slavko Cicak (Montenegro, Sweden, born 1969)
- Roberto Cifuentes (Chile, Netherlands, Spain, born 1957)
- Victor Ciocâltea (Romania, 1932–1983)
- Hermann Clemenz (Estonia, 1846–1908)
- Albert Clerc (France, 1830–1918)
- Viktorija Čmilytė (Lithuania, born 1983)
- John Cochrane (England, 1798–1878)
- Erich Cohn (Germany, 1884–1918)
- Wilhelm Cohn (Germany, 1859–1913)
- Edgard Colle (Belgium, 1897–1932)
- John W. Collins (US, 1912–2001)
- Eugene Ernest Colman (England, 1878–1964)
- Camila Colombo (Uruguay, born 1990)
- Adrián García Conde (Mexico, England, 1886–1943)
- Stuart Conquest (England, born 1967)
- Anya Corke (England, Hong Kong, born 1990)
- Nicolaas Cortlever (Netherlands, 1915–1995)
- Juan Corzo (Cuba, 1873–1941)
- Carlo Cozio (Italy, c. 1715 – c. 1780)
- Spencer Crakanthorp (Australia, 1885–1936)
- Anna Cramling (Spain, Sweden, born 2002)
- Pia Cramling (Sweden, born 1963)
- Robert Crépeaux (France, 1900–1994)
- Walter Cruz (Brazil, 1910–1967)
- István Csom (Hungary, 1940–2021)
- Miguel Cuéllar (Colombia, 1916–1985)
- Josef Cukierman (Poland, France, 1900–1941)
- John Curdo (US, 1931–2022)
- Ognjen Cvitan (Croatia, born 1961)
- Hieronim Czarnowski (Poland, France, Austria-Hungary, 1834–1902)
- Moshe Czerniak (Poland, Israel, 1910–1984)

== D ==
- Arthur Dake (US, 1910–2000)
- Pedro Damiano (Portugal, 1480–1544)
- Mato Damjanović (Croatia, 1927–2011)
- Gösta Danielsson (Sweden, 1912–1978)
- Silvio Danailov (Bulgaria, born 1961)
- A. Polak Daniels (Netherlands, 1842–1891)
- Dawid Daniuszewski (Poland, 1885–1944)
- Klaus Darga (Germany, born 1934)
- Alberto David (Luxembourg, born 1970)
- Jacques Davidson (Netherlands, 1890–1961)
- Nigel Davies (England, born 1960)
- Boris de Greiff (Colombia, 1930–2011)
- Bogdan-Daniel Deac (Romania, born 2001)
- Frederick Deacon (Belgium, 1829–1875)
- Chakkravarthy Deepan (India, born 1987)
- Gukesh Dommaraju (India, born 2006)
- Nick de Firmian (US, born 1957)
- Marigje Degrande (Belgium, born 1992)
- Aleksander Delchev (Bulgaria, born 1971)
- Eugene Delmar (US, 1841–1909)
- Yelena Dembo (Russia, Israel, Hungary, Greece, born 1983)
- Arnold Denker (US, 1914–2005)
- Erald Dervishi (Albania, born 1979)
- Alexandre Deschapelles (France, 1780–1847)
- Andrei Deviatkin (Russia, born 1980)
- Paul Devos (Belgium, 1911–1981)
- André Diamant (Brazil, born 1990)
- Alvaro Dias Huizar (Venezuela, born 1980)
- Emil Josef Diemer (Germany, 1908–1990)
- Mark Diesen (US, 1957–2008)
- Julius Dimer (Germany, 1871–1945)
- Ding Liren (China, born 1992)
- Nathan Divinsky (Canada, 1925–2012)
- Rune Djurhuus (Norway, born 1970)
- Maxim Dlugy (Russia, US, born 1966)
- Josef Dobiáš (Bohemia, Czechoslovakia, 1886–1981)
- Yosef Dobkin (Russia, Israel, 1909–1977)
- Stefan Docx (Belgium, born 1974)
- Yury Dokhoian (Russia, 1964–2021)
- Sergey Dolmatov (Russia, born 1959)
- Lenier Dominguez (Cuba, born 1983)
- Józef Dominik (Poland, 1894–1920)
- Zadok Domnitz (Israel, born 1933)
- Elena Donaldson (Russia, Georgia, US, 1957–2012)
- John W. Donaldson (US, born 1958)
- Ivo Donev (Austria, born 1959)
- Jan Hein Donner (Netherlands, 1927–1988)
- Iossif Dorfman (Ukraine, France, born 1952)
- Alexey Dreev (Russia, born 1969)
- Leonids Dreibergs (Latvia, US, 1908–1969)
- Kurt Dreyer (Germany, South Africa, 1909–1981)
- Tihomil Drezga (Croatia, US, 1903–1981)
- Yuri Drozdovskij (Ukraine, born 1984)
- Leroy Dubeck (US, born 1939)
- Serafino Dubois (Italy, 1817–1899)
- Daniil Dubov (Russia, born 1996)
- Andreas Dückstein (Hungary, Austria, born 1927)
- Jan-Krzysztof Duda (Poland, born 1998)
- Jean Dufresne (Germany, 1829–1893)
- Andreas Duhm (Germany, Switzerland, 1883–1975)
- Dietrich Duhm (Germany, Switzerland, 1880–1954)
- Hans Duhm (Germany, Switzerland, 1878–1946)
- Arthur Dunkelblum (Poland, Belgium, 1906–1979)
- Oldřich Duras (Bohemia, Czechoslovakia, 1882–1957)
- Fyodor Duz-Khotimirsky (Ukraine, 1879–1965)
- Mark Dvoretsky (Russia, 1947–2016)
- Joanna Dworakowska (Poland, born 1978)
- Eduard Dyckhoff (Germany, 1880–1949)
- Viacheslav Dydyshko (Belarus, born 1949)
- Boruch Israel Dyner (Poland, Belgium, Israel, 1903–1979)
- Semen Dvoirys (Russia, born 1958)
- Nana Dzagnidze (Georgia, born 1987)
- Roman Dzindzichashvili (Georgia, Israel, US, born 1944)
- Marat Dzhumaev (Uzbekistan, born 1976)
- Divya Deshmukh (Nagpur, 2005)

== E ==
- James Eade (US, born 1957)
- Yağız Kaan Erdoğmuş (Turkey, born 2011)
- Zahar Efimenko (Ukraine, born 1985)
- Marsel Efroimski (Israel, born 1995)
- Jaan Ehlvest (Estonia, born 1962)
- Louis Eichborn (Germany, 1812–1882)
- Rakhil Eidelson (Belarus, born 1958)
- Vereslav Eingorn (Ukraine, born 1956)
- Louis Eisenberg (Ukraine, US, 1876–after 1909)
- Bengt Ekenberg (Sweden, 1912–1986)
- Folke Ekström (Sweden, 1906–2000)
- Erich Eliskases (Austria, Germany, Argentina, 1913–1997)
- Pavel Eljanov (Ukraine, born 1983)
- Moissei Eljaschoff (Lithuania, 1870–1919)
- John Emms (England, born 1967)
- Peter Enders (Germany, 1963–2025)
- Lūcijs Endzelīns (Estonia, Latvia, Australia, 1909–1981)
- Jens Enevoldsen (Denmark, 1907–1980)
- Ludwig Engels (Germany, Brazil, 1905–1967)
- Berthold Englisch (Austria, 1851–1897)
- Thomas Engqvist (Sweden, born 1963)
- David Enoch (Israel, 1901–1949)
- Vladimir Epishin (Russia, born 1965)
- Stefan Erdélyi (Hungary, Romania, 1905–1968)
- Hanna Ereńska (Poland, born 1946)
- Arjun Erigaisi (India, born 2003)
- Evgenij Ermenkov (Bulgaria, Palestine, born 1949)
- Wilhelm Ernst (Germany, 1905–1952)
- John Angus Erskine (New Zealand, Australia, 1873–1960)
- Andrey Esipenko (Russia, born 2002)
- Yakov Estrin (Russia, 1923–1987)
- Max Euwe (Netherlands, 1901–1981)
- Larry M. Evans (US, 1932–2010)
- William Davies Evans (Wales, 1790–1872)
- Alexander Evensohn (Ukraine, 1892–1919)
- Győző Exner (Hungary, 1864–1945)

== F ==
- Samuel Factor (Poland, US, 1883–1949)
- Louisa Matilda Fagan (Italy, England, 1850–1931)
- Hugo Fähndrich (Hungary, Austria, 1851–1930)
- Hans Fahrni (Bohemia, Switzerland, 1874–1939)
- William Fairhurst (England, Scotland, New Zealand, 1903–1982)
- Sammi Fajarowicz (Germany, 1908–1940)
- Raphael Falk (Russia, 1856–1913)
- Ernst Falkbeer (Austria-Hungary, 1819–1885)
- Stefan Fazekas (Hungary, Czechoslovakia, England, 1898–1967)
- Sergey Fedorchuk (Ukraine, born 1981)
- Alexei Fedorov (Belarus, born 1972)
- John Fedorowicz (US, born 1958)
- Vladimir Fedoseev (Russia, born 1995)
- Movsas Feigins (Latvia, Argentina, 1908–1950)
- Rafał Feinmesser (Poland, born before 1906)
- Florin Felecan (Romania, US, born 1980)
- Virgilio Fenoglio (Argentina, 1902–1990)
- Arthur Feuerstein (US, born 1935)
- Alexandr Fier (Brazil, born 1988)
- Martha Fierro (Ecuador, born 1977)
- Miroslav Filip (Czech Republic, 1928–2009)
- Anton Filippov (Uzbekistan, born 1986)
- Reuben Fine (US, 1914–1993)
- Ben Finegold (US, born 1969)
- Julius Finn (Poland, US, 1871–1931)
- Nick de Firmian (US, born 1957)
- Alireza Firouzja (Iran, France, born 2003)
- Robert James Fischer (US, Iceland, 1943–2008)
- Alex Fishbein (US, born 1968)
- Alexander Flamberg (Poland, 1880–1926)
- Alfred Flatow (Germany, Australia, born 1937)
- Glenn Flear (England, born 1959)
- Ernst Flechsig (Germany, 1852–1890)
- Bernhard Fleissig (Hungary, Austria, 1853–1931)
- Max Fleissig (Hungary, Austria, 1845–1919)
- János Flesch (Hungary, 1933–1983)
- Salo Flohr (Ukraine, Czechoslovakia, Russia, 1908–1983)
- Rodrigo Flores (Chile, 1913–2007)
- Alberto Foguelman (Argentina, 1923–2013)
- Jan Foltys (Czechoslovakia, 1908–1952)
- George Salto Fontein (Netherlands, 1890–1963)
- Leó Forgács (Hungary, 1881–1930)
- Győző Forintos (Hungary, 1935–2018)
- Albert Fox (US, 1881–1964)
- Maurice Fox (Ukraine, Canada, 1898–1988)
- Selim Franklin (England, US, 1814–1884)
- Zenon Franco (Paraguay, born 1956)
- Laurent Fressinet (France, born 1981)
- Sergey von Freymann (Russia, Uzbekistan, 1882–1946)
- Joel Fridlizius (Sweden, 1869–1963)
- Daniel Fridman (Latvia, Germany, born 1976)
- Frederic Friedel (Germany, born 1945)
- Gunnar Friedemann (Estonia, 1909–1943)
- David Friedgood (South Africa, England, born 1946)
- Henryk Friedman (Poland, 1903–1942)
- Alexander Fritz (Germany, 1857–1932)
- Martin Severin From (Denmark, 1828–1895)
- Achilles Frydman (Poland, 1905–1940)
- Paulino Frydman (Poland, Argentina, 1905–1982)
- Ľubomír Ftáčnik (Czechoslovakia, Slovakia, born 1957)
- Andrija Fuderer (Vojvodina, Belgium, 1931–2011)
- Semyon Furman (Russia, 1920–1978)
- Ivana Maria Furtado (India, born 1999)
- Géza Füster (Hungary, Canada, 1910–1990)
- Roy Fyllingen (Norway, born 1975)

== G ==
- Merab Gagunashvili (Georgia, born 1985)
- Aleksandr Galkin (Russia, born 1979)
- Joseph Gallagher (England, Switzerland, born 1964)
- Alisa Galliamova (Russia, born 1972)
- Surya Shekhar Ganguly (India, born 1983)
- Nona Gaprindashvili (Georgia, born 1941)
- Valeriane Gaprindashvili (Georgia, born 1982)
- Carlos Garcia Palermo (Argentina, Italy, born 1953)
- Raimundo García (Argentina, 1936–2020)
- Timur Gareev (Uzbekistan, born 1988)
- Eldar Gasanov (Ukraine, born 1982)
- Vugar Gashimov (Azerbaijan, 1986–2014)
- Anna Gasik (Poland, born 1988)
- Einar Gausel (Norway, born 1963)
- Viktor Gavrikov (Lithuania, Switzerland, 1957–2016)
- Tamaz Gelashvili (Georgia, born 1978)
- Boris Gelfand (Belarus, Israel, born 1968)
- Efim Geller (Ukraine, 1925–1998)
- Uzi Geller (Israel, born 1931)
- Petar Genov (Bulgaria, born 1970)
- Kiril Georgiev (Bulgaria, born 1965)
- Krum Georgiev (Bulgaria, born 1958)
- Ernő Gereben (Hungary, Switzerland, 1907–1988)
- Regina Gerlecka (Poland, 1913–1983)
- Eugênio German (Brazil, 1930–2001)
- Theodor Germann (Latvia, 1879–1935)
- Alik Gershon (Israel, born 1980)
- Edward Gerstenfeld (Poland, Ukraine 1915–1943)
- Georgy Geshev (Bulgaria, 1903–1937)
- Ehsan Ghaem Maghami (Iran, born 1982)
- Tigran Gharamian (France, born 1984)
- Ameet Ghasi (England, born 1987)
- Florin Gheorghiu (Romania, born 1944)
- Amédée Gibaud (France, 1885–1957)
- Johannes Giersing (Denmark, 1872–1954)
- Ellen Gilbert (US, 1837–1900)
- Jessie Gilbert (England, 1987–2006)
- Karl Gilg (Czechoslovakia, Germany, 1901–1981)
- Aivars Gipslis (Latvia, 1937–2000)
- Anish Giri (Netherlands, born 1994)
- Matteo Gladig (Italy, 1880–1915)
- Eduard Glass (Austria, 1902–after 1980)
- Evgeny Gleizerov (Russia, born 1963)
- Igor Glek (Russia, Germany, born 1961)
- Svetozar Gligorić (Serbia, 1923–2012)
- Fernand Gobet (Switzerland, born 1962)
- Michele Godena (Italy, born 1967)
- Carl Goering (Germany, 1841–1879)
- Alphonse Goetz (France, 1865–1934)
- Leonid Gofshtein (Israel, 1953–2015)
- Jason Goh Koon-Jong (Singapore, born 1989)
- Goh Weiming (Singapore, born 1983)
- Samuel Gold (Hungary, Austria, US, 1835–1920)
- Alexander Goldin (Russia, born 1964)
- Rusudan Goletiani (Georgia, US, born 1980)
- Celso Golmayo Torriente (Cuba, Spain, 1879–1924)
- Celso Golmayo Zúpide (Spain, Cuba, 1820–1898)
- Manuel Golmayo Torriente (Cuba, Spain, 1883–1973)
- Vitali Golod (Ukraine, Israel, born 1971)
- Harry Golombek (England, 1911–1995)
- Alexander Goloshchapov (Ukraine, born 1978)
- Alexander Ferdinand von der Goltz (Germany, 1819–1858)
- Valentina Golubenko (Estonia, Croatia, born 1990)
- Mikhail Golubev (Ukraine, born 1970)
- Aleksei Goncharov (Russia, 1879–1913)
- Gong Qianyun (China, born 1985)
- Jayson Gonzales (Philippines, born 1969)
- José González García (Mexico, born 1973)
- Juan Carlos González Zamora (Mexico, born 1968)
- David S. Goodman (England, US, born 1958)
- Stephen J. Gordon (England, born 1986)
- Danny Gormally (England, born 1976)
- Aleksandra Goryachkina (Russia, born 1998)
- George H. D. Gossip (US, England, 1841–1907)
- Solomon Gotthilf (Russia, 1903–1967)
- Hermann von Gottschall (Germany, 1862–1933)
- Boris Grachev (Russia, born 1986)
- Alexander Graf (Uzbekistan, Germany, born 1962)
- Sonja Graf (Germany, Argentina, US, 1908–1965)
- Julio Granda Zuniga (Peru, born 1967)
- Roberto Grau (Argentina, 1900–1944)
- Gioachino Greco (Italy, 1600 – c. 1634)
- Ewen McGowen Green (New Zealand, born 1950)
- Alon Greenfeld (US, Israel, born 1964)
- John Grefe (US, 1947–2013)
- Bernhard Gregory (Estonia, Germany, 1879–1939)
- Gisela Kahn Gresser (US, 1906–2000)
- Helgi Grétarsson (Iceland, born 1977)
- Richard Griffith (England, 1872–1955)
- Nikolay Grigoriev (Russia, 1895–1935)
- Avetik Grigoryan (Armenia, born 1989)
- Vincent Grimm (Austria, Hungary, 1800–1872)
- Alexander Grischuk (Russia, born 1983)
- Efstratios Grivas (Greece, born 1966)
- Henri Grob (Switzerland, 1904–1974)
- Aristide Gromer (France, 1908–1966)
- Adriaan de Groot (Netherlands, 1914–2006)
- Ernst Grünfeld (Austria, 1893–1962)
- Yehuda Gruenfeld (Poland, Israel, born 1956)
- James Grundy (England, US, 1855–1919)
- Izaak Grynfeld (Poland, Israel, born 1920)
- Gu Xiaobing (China, born 1985)
- Ion Gudju (Romania, 1897–1988)
- Eduard Gufeld (Ukraine, US, 1936–2002)
- Ilse Guggenberger (Colombia, born 1942)
- Carlos Guimard (Argentina, 1913–1998)
- Vidit Gujrathi (India, born 1994)
- Boris Gulko (Russia, US, born 1947)
- Gunnar Gundersen (France, Norway, Australia, 1882–1943)
- Isidor Gunsberg (Hungary, England, 1854–1930)
- Abhijeet Gupta (India, born 1989)
- Dmitry Gurevich (Russia, US, born 1956)
- Ilya Gurevich (Ukraine, US, born 1972)
- Mikhail Gurevich (Ukraine, Belgium, Turkey, born 1959)
- Bukhuti Gurgenidze (Georgia, 1933–2008)
- Jan Gustafsson (Germany, born 1979)
- Emanuel Guthi (Israel, born 1938)
- Lev Gutman (Latvia, Israel, Germany, born 1945)
- Fritz Gygli (Switzerland, 1896–1980)
- Alfred William Gyles (New Zealand, 1888–1967)

== H ==
- Anna Hahn (Latvia, US, born 1976)
- Vitaly Halberstadt (Ukraine, France, 1903–1967)
- Alexander Halprin (Russia, Austria, 1868–1921)
- Tunç Hamarat (Turkey, Austria, born 1946)
- Hichem Hamdouchi (Morocco, born 1972)
- Rani Hamid (Bangladesh, born 1944)
- Jon Ludvig Hammer (Norway, born 1990)
- Carl Hamppe (Switzerland, Austria, 1814–1876)
- Milton Hanauer (US, 1908–1988)
- James Hanham (US, 1840–1923)
- Hermann von Hanneken (Germany, 1810–1886)
- Curt Hansen (Denmark, born 1964)
- Wilhelm Hanstein (Germany, 1811–1850)
- Khosro Harandi (Iran, 1950–2019)
- Dronavalli Harika (India, born 1991)
- Pendyala Harikrishna (India, born 1986)
- Max Harmonist (Germany, 1864–1907)
- Daniel Harrwitz (Germany, France, 1823–1884)
- William Hartston (England, born 1947)
- Wolfgang Hasenfuss (Latvia, 1900–1944)
- Stewart Haslinger (England, born 1981)
- Arnaud Hauchard (France, born 1971)
- Cécile Haussernot (France, born 1998)
- Kornél Havasi (Hungary, 1892–1945)
- Jonathan Hawkins (England, 1983–2025)
- Mark Hebden (England, born 1958)
- Bartłomiej Heberla (Poland, born 1985)
- Jean Hébert (Canada, born 1957)
- Hans-Joachim Hecht (Germany, born 1939)
- Jonny Hector (Sweden, born 1964)
- Fenny Heemskerk (Netherlands, 1919–2007)
- Wolfgang Heidenfeld (Germany, South Africa, Ireland, 1911–1981)
- Jakub Heilpern (Poland, 1850–1910)
- Herbert Heinicke (Brazil, Germany, 1905–1988)
- Arved Heinrichsen (Lithuania, 1879–1900)
- Dan Heisman (US, born 1950)
- Grigory Helbach (Russia, 1863–1930)
- Karl Helling (Germany, 1904–1937)
- Johan Hellsten (Sweden, born 1975)
- Hermann Helms (US, 1870–1963)
- Ron Henley (US, born 1956)
- Moriz Henneberger (Switzerland, 1878–1959)
- Walter Henneberger (Switzerland, 1883–1969)
- Deen Hergott (Canada, born 1962)
- Sigmund Herland (Romania, 1865–1954)
- Róża Herman (Poland, 1902–1995)
- Gilberto Hernández Guerrero (Mexico, born 1970)
- Robert Hess (US, born 1991)
- Tiger Hillarp Persson (Sweden, born 1970)
- Wilhelm Hilse (Germany, 1878–1940)
- Moshe Hirschbein (Poland, 1894–1940)
- Moses Hirschel (Germany, 1754 – c. 1823)
- Philipp Hirschfeld (Germany, 1840–1896)
- Jóhann Hjartarson (Iceland, born 1963)
- Hoang Thanh Trang (Vietnam, Hungary, born 1980)
- Albert Hodges (US, 1861–1944)
- Julian Hodgson (England, born 1963)
- Leopold Hoffer (Hungary, France, England, 1842–1913)
- Karl Holländer (Germany, 1868–? )
- Edith Holloway (England, 1868–1956)
- Krystyna Hołuj-Radzikowska (Poland, 1931–2006)
- Walther von Holzhausen (Austria, Germany, 1876–1935)
- Baldur Hönlinger (Austria, Germany, 1905–1990)
- Bill Hook (US, British Virgin Islands, 1925–2010)
- Vlastimil Hort (Czechoslovakia, Germany, born 1944)
- Israel Horowitz (US, 1907–1973)
- Bernhard Horwitz (Germany, England, 1807–1885)
- Henry Hosmer (US, 1837–1892)
- Enamul Hossain (Bangladesh, born 1981)
- Hou Yifan (China, born 1994)
- Jovanka Houska (England, born 1980)
- Clarence Howell (US, 1881–1936)
- David Howell (England, born 1990)
- James Howell (England, born 1967)
- Zbyněk Hráček (Czech Republic, born 1970)
- Karel Hromádka (Bohemia, Czechoslovakia, 1887–1956)
- Vincenz Hruby (Bohemia, Austria, Italy, 1856–1917)
- Hsu Li Yang (Singapore, born 1972)
- Huang Qian (China, born 1986)
- Robert Hübner (Germany, 1948–2025)
- Werner Hug (Switzerland, born 1952)
- Krunoslav Hulak (Croatia, 1951–2015)
- Koneru Humpy (India, born 1987)
- Harriet Hunt (England, born 1978)
- Niclas Huschenbeth (Germany, born 1992)
- Alexander Huzman (Ukraine, Israel, born 1962)

== I ==
- Ildar Ibragimov (Russia, US, born 1967)
- Bella Igla (Russia, Israel, born 1985)
- Juan Iliesco (Romania, Argentina, 1898–1968)
- Rolando Illa (US, Cuba, Argentina, 1880–1937)
- Miguel Illescas Córdoba (Spain, born 1965)
- Alexander Ilyin-Zhenevsky (Russia, 1894–1941)
- Ernesto Inarkiev (Kyrgyzstan, Russia, born 1985)
- Viorel Iordăchescu (Moldova, born 1977)
- Nana Ioseliani (Georgia, born 1962)
- Alexander Ipatov (Ukraine, Spain, Turkey, born 1993)
- Andrei Istrățescu (Romania, born 1975)
- Eduardo Iturrizaga (Venezuela, Spain, born 1989)
- Saidali Iuldachev (Uzbekistan, born 1968)
- Vasyl Ivanchuk (Ukraine, born 1969)
- Ivan Ivanišević (Serbia, born 1977)
- Alexander Ivanov (US, born 1956)
- Igor Ivanov (Russia, Canada, US, 1947–2005)
- Božidar Ivanović (Montenegro, born 1946)
- Borislav Ivkov (Serbia, born 1933)
- Stefan Izbinsky (Ukraine, 1884–1912)
- Zviad Izoria (Georgia, born 1984)

== J ==
- Jana Jacková (Czech Republic, born 1982)
- Egil Jacobsen (Denmark, 1897–1923)
- Ernst Jacobson (Sweden, 1889–1963)
- Carl Jaenisch (Finland, Russia, 1813–1872)
- Charles Jaffe (Russia, US, 1883–1941)
- Jerzy Jagielski (Poland, Germany, 1897–1955)
- Dmitry Jakovenko (Russia, born 1983)
- Lora Jakovleva (Russia, born 1932)
- Dragoljub Janošević (Serbia, 1923–1993)
- Chaim Janowski (Poland, Germany, Japan, c.1868–1935)
- Dawid Janowski (Poland, France, 1868–1927)
- Vlastimil Jansa (Czech Republic, born 1942)
- Nicolai Jasnogrodsky (Ukraine, England, US, 1859–1914)
- Carlos Jáuregui (Chile, Canada, 1932–2013)
- Florian Jenni (Switzerland, born 1980)
- Eleazar Jiménez (Cuba, 1928–2000)
- Baadur Jobava (Georgia, born 1983)
- Leif Erlend Johannessen (Norway, born 1980)
- Svein Johannessen (Norway, 1937–2007)
- Darryl Johansen (Australia, born 1959)
- Walter John (Poland, Germany, 1879–1940)
- Hans Johner (Switzerland, 1889–1975)
- Paul Johner (Switzerland, 1887–1938)
- Gawain Jones (England, born 1987)
- Iolo Jones (Wales, 1947–2021)
- Paul Journoud (France, 1821–1882)
- Ju Wenjun (China, born 1991)
- Max Judd (Poland, US, 1851–1906)
- Klaus Junge (Chile, Germany, 1924–1945)
- Otto Junge (Chile, Germany, 1887–1978)
- Miervaldis Jurševskis (Latvia, Canada, 1921–2014)

== K ==
- Bernhard Kagan (Poland, Germany, 1866–1932)
- Shimon Kagan (Israel, born 1942)
- Victor Kahn (Russia, France, 1889–1971)
- Sultan Khan (British India, 1903–1966)
- Gregory Kaidanov (Ukraine, Russia, US, born 1959)
- Osmo Kaila (Finland, 1916–1991)
- Charles Kalme (Latvia, Germany, US, 1939–2003)
- Gata Kamsky (Russia, US, born 1974)
- Ilya Kan (Russia, 1909–1978)
- Marcus Kann (Austria, 1820–1886)
- Albert Kapengut (Belarus, US, born 1944)
- Julio Kaplan (Argentina, Puerto Rico, US, born 1950)
- Darja Kapš (Slovenia, born 1981)
- Mona May Karff (Moldova, Russia, Palestine, US, 1914–1998)
- Sergey Karjakin (Ukraine, born 1990)
- Anastasiya Karlovich (Ukraine, born 1982)
- Anatoly Karpov (Russia, born 1951)
- Isaac Kashdan (US, 1905–1985)
- Rustam Kasimdzhanov (Uzbekistan, born 1979)
- Garry Kasparov (Azerbaijan, Russia, born 1963)
- Genrikh Kasparyan (Armenia, 1910–1995)
- Miroslav Katětov (Czechoslovakia, 1918–1995)
- Arthur Kaufmann (Romania, Austria, 1872–1940)
- Lubomir Kavalek (Czechoslovakia, US, 1943–2021)
- Raymond Keene (England, born 1948)
- Hermann Keidanski (Poland, Germany, 1865–1938)
- Dieter Keller (Switzerland, born 1936)
- Edith Keller-Herrmann (Germany, 1921–2010)
- Rudolf Keller (Germany, 1917–1993)
- Brian Kelly (Ireland, born 1978)
- Emil Kemény (Hungary, US, 1860–1925)
- Edvīns Ķeņģis (Latvia, born 1959)
- Hugh Alexander Kennedy (Ireland, England, 1809–1878)
- Paul Keres (Estonia, 1916–1975)
- Alexander Kevitz (US, 1902–1981)
- Rohini Khadilkar (India, born 1963)
- Alexander Khalifman (Russia, born 1966)
- Mir Sultan Khan (India, Pakistan, 1905–1966)
- Andrei Kharlov (Russia, 1968–2014)
- Murtas Kazhgaleyev (Kazakhstan, born 1973)
- Abram Khavin (Ukraine, 1914–1974)
- Igor Khenkin (Russia, Germany, born 1968)
- Denis Khismatullin (Russia, born 1984)
- Ratmir Kholmov (Russia, Belarus, Lithuania, 1925–2006)
- Natalia Khoudgarian (Russia, Canada, born 1973)
- Nino Khurtsidze (Georgia, 1975–2018)
- Feliks Kibbermann (Estonia, 1902–1993)
- Georg Kieninger (Germany, 1902–1975)
- Lionel Kieseritzky (Estonia, France, 1806–1853)
- R.K. Kieseritzky (Estonia, Russia, c. 1870 – after 1922)
- Daniel King (England, born 1963)
- Olof Kinnmark (Sweden, 1897–1970)
- Ove Kinnmark (Sweden, 1944–2015)
- Georg Klaus (Germany, 1912–1974)
- Jan Kleczyński Jr. (Poland, 1875–1939)
- Jan Kleczyński Sr. (Poland, 1837–1895)
- Ernst Klein (Austria, England, 1910–1990)
- Paul Klein (Germany, Ecuador, 1915–1992)
- Josef Kling (Germany, 1811–1876)
- Jānis Klovāns (Latvia, 1935–2010)
- Gyula Kluger (Hungary, 1914–1994)
- Hans Kmoch (Austria, Netherlands, US, 1894–1973)
- Rainer Knaak (Germany, born 1953)
- Viktor Knorre (Russia, 1840–1919)
- Mikhail Kobalia (Russia, born 1978)
- Alexander Koblencs (Latvia, 1916–1993)
- Berthold Koch (Germany, 1899–1988)
- Alexander Kochyev (Russia, born 1956)
- Artur Kogan (Ukraine, Israel, born 1974)
- Boris Kogan (Russia, US, 1940–1993)
- Anton Kohler (Germany, c. 1907–1961)
- Stanisław Kohn (Poland, 1895–1940)
- Friedrich Köhnlein (Germany, 1879–1916)
- Dmitry Kokarev (Russia, born 1982)
- Atanas Kolev (Bulgaria, born 1967)
- Ignác Kolisch (Slovakia, Austria-Hungary, 1837–1899)
- Jakub Kolski (Poland, 1899–1941)
- George Koltanowski (Belgium, US, 1903–2000)
- Henrijeta Konarkowska-Sokolov (Poland, Serbia, born 1938)
- Humpy Koneru (India, born 1987)
- Imre König (Hungary, Yugoslavia, England, US, 1899–1992)
- Jerzy Konikowski (Poland, Germany, born 1947)
- Alexander Konstantinopolsky (Ukraine, 1910–1990)
- Danny Kopec (US, 1954–2016)
- Viktor Korchnoi (Russia, Switzerland, 1931–2016)
- Akshayraj Kore (India, born 1988)
- Anton Korobov (Ukraine, born 1985)
- Imre Korody (Hungary, 1905–1969)
- Alexey Korotylev (Russia, born 1977)
- Yona Kosashvili (Georgia, Israel, born 1970)
- Gary Koshnitsky (Moldova, Australia, 1907–1999)
- Nadezhda Kosintseva (Russia, born 1985)
- Tatiana Kosintseva (Russia, born 1986)
- Alexandra Kosteniuk (Russia, born 1984)
- Boris Kostić (Austria-Hungary, Yugoslavia, 1887–1963)
- Jan Kotrč (Czechoslovakia, 1862–1943)
- Vasilios Kotronias (Greece, born 1964)
- Pavel Kotsur (Kazakhstan, born 1974)
- Alexander Kotov (Russia, 1913–1981)
- Čeněk Kottnauer (Czechoslovakia, England, 1910–1996)
- Bachar Kouatly (Syria, Liban, France, born 1958)
- Vlatko Kovačević (Croatia, born 1942)
- Alexander Kovchan (Ukraine, born 1983)
- Boris Koyalovich (Russia, 1867–1941)
- Valentina Kozlovskaya (Russia, born 1938)
- Zdenko Kožul (Croatia, born 1966)
- Jesse Kraai (US, born 1972)
- Yair Kraidman (Israel, born 1932)
- Adolf Kraemer (Germany, 1898–1972)
- Adolf Kramer (Germany, 1871–1934)
- Haije Kramer (Netherlands, 1917–2004)
- Vladimir Kramnik (Russia, born 1975)
- Michał Krasenkow (Russia, Poland, born 1963)
- Orla Hermann Krause (Denmark, 1867–1935)
- Martyn Kravtsiv (Ukraine, born 1990)
- Boris Kreiman (Russia, US, born 1976)
- Josef Krejcik (Austria, 1885–1957)
- Leon Kremer (Poland, 1901–1941)
- Martin Kreuzer (Germany, born 1962)
- Ljuba Kristol (Russia, Israel, born 1944)
- Stanislav Kriventsov (Russia, US, born 1973)
- Nikolai Krogius (Russia, born 1930)
- Paul Krüger (Germany, 1871–1939)
- Irina Krush (Ukraine, US, born 1983)
- Yuriy Kryvoruchko (Ukraine, born 1986)
- Arvid Kubbel (Russia, 1889–1938)
- Leonid Kubbel (Russia, 1891–1942)
- Sergey Kudrin (Russia, US, born 1959)
- Adam Kuligowski (Poland, born 1955)
- Kaido Külaots (Estonia, born 1976)
- Abhijit Kunte (India, born 1977)
- Abraham Kupchik (Belarus, US, 1892–1970)
- Viktor Kupreichik (Belarus, 1949–2017)
- Bojan Kurajica (Bosnia and Herzegovina, born 1947)
- Igor Kurnosov (Russia, 1985–2013)
- Alla Kushnir (Russia, Israel, 1941–2013)
- Gennady Kuzmin (Russia, 1946–2020)
- Yuriy Kuzubov (Ukraine, born 1990)
- Jan Kvicala (Czechoslovakia, 1868–1939)
- Nijat Khalfazade (Azerbaijan, born 2013)

== L ==
- Kateryna Lahno (Ukraine, born 1989)
- Bogdan Lalić (Yugoslavia/Croatia, England, born 1964)
- Erwin l'Ami (Netherlands, born 1985)
- Frank Lamprecht (Germany, born 1968)
- Konstantin Landa (Russia, 1972–2022)
- Salo Landau (Poland, Netherlands, 1903–1944)
- Gary Lane (England, Australia, born 1964)
- Lisa Lane (US, born 1938)
- Max Lange (Germany, 1832–1899)
- Salomon Langleben (Poland, 1862–1939)
- Prin Laohawirapap (Thailand, born 2006)
- Bent Larsen (Denmark, 1935–2010)
- Ernst Larsson (Sweden, 1897–1963)
- Baron Tassilo von Heydebrand und der Lasa (Prussia/Germany, 1818–1899)
- Berthold Lasker (Germany, 1860–1928)
- Edward Lasker (Poland, Germany, US, 1885–1981)
- Emanuel Lasker (Germany, Russia, US, 1868–1941)
- Milda Lauberte (Latvia, 1918–2009)
- Leho Laurine (Estonia, Sweden, 1904–1998)
- Jessica Lauser (US, born 1980)
- Joël Lautier (Canada, France, born 1973)
- Darwin Laylo (Philippines, born 1980)
- Frédéric Lazard (France, 1883–1948)
- Gustave Lazard (France, 1876–1949)
- Milunka Lazarević (Serbia, 1932–2018)
- Viktor Láznička (Czech Republic, born 1988)
- Lê Quang Liêm (Vietnam, born 1991)
- Sergey Lebedev (Russia, 1868–1942)
- Peter Lee (England, born 1943)
- Peter Leepin (Switzerland, 1920–1995)
- Legall de Kermeur (France, 1702–1792)
- Anatoly Lein (Russia, US, 1931–2018)
- Péter Lékó (Hungary, born 1979)
- Giovanni Leonardo (Italy, 1542–1587)
- Paul Saladin Leonhardt (Poland, Germany, 1877–1934)
- Alex Lenderman (US, born 1989)
- James A. Leonard (US, 1841–1862)
- Konstantin Lerner (Ukraine, 1950–2011)
- Jean-Pierre Le Roux (France, born 1982)
- Alexandre Lesiège (Canada, born 1975)
- Norman Lessing (US, 1911–2001)
- René Letelier (Chile, 1915–2006)
- Grigory Levenfish (Poland, Russia, 1889–1961)
- Aleksandr Levin (Russia, 1871–1929)
- Jacob Levin (US, 1904–1992)
- Naum Levin (Ukraine, Australia, born 1933)
- Caleb Levitan (South Africa, born 2010)
- Yuliya Levitan (USA, born 1973)
- Irina Levitina (Russia, US, born 1954)
- Stepan Levitsky (Russia, 1876–1924)
- David Levy (Scotland, born 1945)
- Jerzy Lewi (Poland, Sweden, 1949–1972)
- Moritz Lewitt (Germany, 1863–1936)
- Li Chao (China, born 1989)
- Li Ruofan (Singapore, born 1978)
- Li Shilong (China, born 1977)
- Li Shongjian (China, born 1939)
- Li Wenliang (China, born 1967)
- Li Zunian (China, born 1958)
- Liang Chong (China, born 1980)
- Liang Jinrong (China, born 1960)
- Vladimir Liberzon (Russia, Israel, 1937–1996)
- Theodor Lichtenhein (Germany, US, 1829–1874)
- Espen Lie (Norway, born 1984)
- Kjetil Aleksander Lie (Norway, born 1980)
- Andor Lilienthal (Hungary, Russia, 1911–2010)
- Darcy Lima (Brazil, born 1962)
- Lin Ta (China, born 1963)
- Lin Weiguo (China, born 1970)
- Paul Lipke (Germany, 1870–1955)
- Isaac Lipnitsky (Ukraine, 1923–1959)
- Samuel Lipschütz (Hungary, US, 1863–1905)
- Georgy Lisitsin (Russia, 1909–1972)
- Paul List (Ukraine, Germany, England, 1887–1954)
- Marta Litinskaya-Shul (Ukraine, born 1949)
- John Littlewood (England, 1931–2009)
- Liu Shilan (China, born 1962)
- Liu Wenzhe (China, 1940–2010)
- Ljubomir Ljubojević (Serbia, born 1950)
- Eric Lobron (US, Germany, born 1960)
- Josef Lokvenc (Austria, 1899–1974)
- Giambattista Lolli (Italy, 1698–1769)
- Rudolf Loman (Netherlands, 1861–1932)
- William Lombardy (US, 1937–2017)
- Ruy López de Segura (Spain, c. 1530 – c. 1580)
- Edward Löwe (England, 1794–1880)
- Otto Löwenborg (Sweden, 1888–1969)
- Johann Löwenthal (Hungary, England, 1810–1876)
- Leopold Löwy, Jr (Austria, 1871–1940)
- Leopold Löwy, Sr (Austria, 1840–after 1904)
- Moishe Lowtzky (Ukraine, Poland, 1881–1940)
- Sam Loyd (US, 1841–1911)
- Smbat Lputian (Armenia, born 1958)
- Luis Ramirez Lucena (Spain, c. 1465 – c. 1530)
- Markas Luckis (Lithuania, Argentina, 1905–1973)
- Andrey Lukin (Russia, born 1948)
- Stig Lundholm (Sweden, 1917–2009)
- Erik Lundin (Sweden, 1904–1988)
- Francisco Lupi (Portugal, 1920–1954)
- Constantin Lupulescu (Romania, born 1984)
- Thomas Luther (Germany, born 1969)
- Christopher Lutz (Germany, born 1971)

== M ==
- Gottlieb Machate (Germany, 1904–1974)
- Aleksandras Machtas (Lithuania, Israel, 1892–1973)
- Bartłomiej Macieja (Poland, born 1977)
- George Henry Mackenzie (Scotland, US, 1837–1891)
- Nicholas MacLeod (Canada, 1870–1965)
- Carlos Maderna (Argentina, 1910–1976)
- Ildikó Mádl (Hungary, born 1969)
- Elmar Magerramov (Azerbaijan, born 1958)
- Joanna Majdan (Poland, born 1988)
- Kazimierz Makarczyk (Poland, 1901–1972)
- Vladimir Makogonov (Azerbaijan, 1904–1993)
- Gyula Makovetz (Hungary, 1860–1903)
- Vadim Malakhatko (Ukraine, Belgium, born 1977)
- Vladimir Malakhov (Russia, born 1980)
- Vidmantas Mališauskas (Lithuania, born 1963)
- Vladimir Malaniuk (Russia, Ukraine, 1957–2017)
- Boris Maliutin (Russia, 1883–1920)
- Nidjat Mamedov (Azerbaijan, born 1985)
- Shakhriyar Mamedyarov (Azerbaijan, born 1985)
- Rauf Mamedov (Azerbaijan, born 1988)
- Maria Manakova (Serbia, born 1974)
- Karmen Mar (Slovenia, born 1987)
- Napoleon Marache (France, US, 1818–1875)
- Max Marchand (Netherlands, 1888–1957)
- Georg Marco (Romania, Austria, 1863–1923)
- Alisa Marić (Serbia, born 1970)
- Mirjana Marić (Serbia, born 1970)
- Mihail Marin (Romania, born 1965)
- Beatriz Marinello (Chile, born 1964)
- Sergio Mariotti (Italy, born 1946)
- Ján Markoš (Slovakia, born 1985)
- Tomasz Markowski (Poland, born 1975)
- Robert Markuš (Serbia, born 1983)
- Géza Maróczy (Hungary, 1870–1951)
- Davide Marotti (Italy, 1881–1940)
- Dražen Marović (Croatia, born 1938)
- Frank Marshall (US, 1877–1944)
- Dion Martinez (Cuba, US, 1837–1928)
- Giovanni Martinolich (Italy, 1884–1910)
- Rico Mascariñas (Philippines, born 1953)
- Houshang Mashian (Iran, Israel, born 1938)
- James Mason (Ireland, US, England, 1849–1905)
- Dimitrios Mastrovasilis (Greece, born 1983)
- Aleksandar Matanović (Serbia, born 1930)
- Hermanis Matisons (Latvia, 1894–1932)
- Milan Matulović (Serbia, 1935–2013)
- Svetlana Matveeva (Russia, born 1969)
- Carl Mayet (Germany, 1810–1868)
- Isaak Mazel (Belarus, Russia, 1911–1943)
- Neil McDonald (England, born 1967)
- Alexander McDonnell (Ireland, 1798–1835)
- Colin McNab (Scotland, born 1961)
- Luke McShane (England, born 1984)
- Henrique Mecking (Brazil, born 1952)
- Antonio Medina (Spain, 1919–2003)
- Edmar Mednis (Latvia, US, 1937–2002)
- Susanto Megaranto (Indonesia, born 1987)
- Philipp Meitner (Austria, 1838–1910)
- Hrant Melkumyan (Armenia, born 1989)
- Olga Menchik (Russia, Czechoslovakia, England, 1908–1944)
- Vera Menchik (Russia, Czechoslovakia, England, 1906–1944)
- Julius Mendheim (Germany, 1788–1836)
- Jonathan Mestel (England, born 1957)
- Johannes Metger (Germany, 1850–1926)
- Voldemārs Mežgailis (Latvia, 1912–1998)
- Paul Michel (Germany, Argentina, 1905–1977)
- Walter Michel (Switzerland, 1888–1969)
- Reginald Pryce Michell (England, 1873–1938)
- Jacques Mieses (Germany, England, 1865–1954)
- Samuel Mieses (Germany, 1841–1884)
- Lu Miaoyi (China, born 2010)
- Vladas Mikėnas (Estonia, Lithuania, 1910–1992)
- Adrian Mikhalchishin (Ukraine, Slovenia, born 1954)
- Victor Mikhalevski (Belarus, Israel, born 1972)
- Igor Miladinović (Serbia, born 1974)
- Tony Miles (England, 1955–2001)
- Zdravko Milev (Bulgaria, 1929–1984)
- Borislav Milić (Yugoslavia, 1925–1986)
- Sophie Milliet (France, born 1983)
- Stuart Milner-Barry (England, 1906–1995)
- Vadim Milov (Russia, Israel, Switzerland, born 1972)
- Artashes Minasian (Armenia, born 1987)
- Johannes Minckwitz (Germany, 1843–1901)
- Nikolay Minev (Bulgaria, US, 1931–2017)
- Dragoljub Minić (Montenegro, 1936–2005)
- Evgenij Miroshnichenko (Ukraine, born 1978)
- Azer Mirzoev (Azerbaijan, born 1978)
- Vesna Mišanović (Bosnia, born 1964)
- Abhimanyu Mishra (US, born 2009)
- Kamil Mitoń (Poland, born 1984)
- Jack Mizzi (Malta, born 2006)
- Lilit Mkrtchian (Armenia, born 1982)
- Stasch Mlotkowski (US, 1881–1943)
- Abram Model (Latvia, Russia, 1896–1976)
- Charles Moehle (US, 1859–1898)
- Ariah Mohiliver (Poland, Israel, 1904–1996)
- Stefan Mohr (Germany, born 1967)
- Alexander Moiseenko (Ukraine, born 1980)
- Baldur Möller (Iceland, 1914–1999)
- Jørgen Møller (Denmark, 1873–1944)
- Augustus Mongredien (England, 1807–1888)
- Léon Monosson (Belarus, France, 1892–1943)
- Julius du Mont (France, England, 1881–1956)
- Mario Monticelli (Italy, 1902–1995)
- María Teresa Mora (Cuba, 1902–1980)
- Elshan Moradi (Iran, born 1985)
- Luciana Morales Mendoza (Peru, born 1987)
- Kalikst Morawski (Poland, 1859 – c. 1939)
- Bruno Moritz (Germany, Ecuador, 1898–?)
- Iván Morovic (Chile, born 1963)
- Alexander Moroz (Ukraine, 1961–2009)
- Alexander Morozevich (Russia, born 1977)
- Paul Morphy (US, 1837–1884)
- John Morrison (Canada, 1889–1975)
- Paul Motwani (Scotland, born 1962)
- Alexander Motylev (Russia, born 1979)
- Sergei Movsesian (Armenia, Slovakia, born 1978)
- Paul Mross (Poland, Germany, 1910–1991)
- Martin Mrva (Slovakia, born 1971)
- Fatos Muço (Albania, born 1949)
- André Muffang (France, 1897–1989)
- Hans Müller (Austria, 1896–1971)
- Karsten Müller (Germany, born 1970)
- César Muñoz (Ecuador, 1929–2000)
- Piotr Murdzia (Poland, born 1975)
- Jacob Murey (Russia, Israel, born 1941)
- Augusto de Muro (Argentina, ? –1959)
- Niaz Murshed (Bangladesh, born 1966)
- Phiona Mutesi (Uganda, born 1996)
- Anna Muzychuk (Ukraine, Slovenia, born 1990)
- Mariya Muzychuk (Ukraine, born 1992)
- Lhamsuren Myagmarsuren (Mongolia, born 1938)
- Hugh Myers (US, 1930–2008)

== N ==
- Ashot Nadanian (Armenia, born 1972)
- Arkadij Naiditsch (Latvia, Germany, born 1985)
- Oskar Naegeli (Switzerland, 1885–1959)
- Géza Nagy (Hungary, 1892–1953)
- Miguel Najdorf (Poland, Argentina, 1910–1997)
- Hikaru Nakamura (Japan, US, born 1987)
- William Napier (England, US, 1881–1952)
- Mario Napolitano (Italy, 1910–1995)
- Renato Naranja (Philippines, born 1940)
- Srinath Narayanan (India, born 1994)
- Daniel Naroditsky (US, 1995–2025)
- David Navara (Czech Republic, born 1985)
- Vera Nebolsina (Russia, born 1989)
- Ozren Nedeljković (Serbia, 1903–1984)
- Gastón Needleman (Argentina, born 1990)
- Parimarjan Negi (India, born 1993)
- Iivo Nei (Estonia, born 1931)
- Oleg Neikirch (Georgia, Bulgaria, 1914–1985)
- Kateřina Němcová (Czech Republic, born 1990)
- Vladimir Nenarokov (Russia, 1880–1953)
- Ian Nepomniachtchi (Russia, born 1990)
- Vincenzo Nestler (Italy, 1912–1988)
- Augustin Neumann (Austria, 1879–1906)
- Gustav Neumann (Germany, 1838–1881)
- Vladislav Nevednichy (Romania, born 1969)
- Valeriy Neverov (Ukraine, born 1964)
- Rashid Nezhmetdinov (Russia, 1912–1974)
- Ni Hua (China, born 1983)
- Arno Nickel (Germany, born 1952)
- Bryon Nickoloff (Canada, 1956–2004)
- Bjørn Nielsen (Denmark, 1907–1949)
- Peter Heine Nielsen (Denmark, born 1973)
- Torkil Nielsen (Faroe Islands, born 1964)
- Hans Niemann (US, born 2003)
- Walter Niephaus (Germany, 1923–1992)
- Aleksandr Nikitin (Russia, 1935–2022)
- Yuri Nikolaevsky (Ukraine, 1937–2004)
- Ioannis Nikolaidis (Greece, born 1971)
- Predrag Nikolić (Bosnia and Herzegovina, born 1960)
- Allan Nilsson (Sweden, 1899–1949)
- Aron Nimzowitsch (Latvia, Denmark, 1886–1935)
- Ning Chunhong (China, born 1968)
- Bhupendra Niraula (Nepal, born 1981)
- Liviu-Dieter Nisipeanu (Romania, born 1976)
- Josef Noa (Hungary, 1856–1903)
- Jesús Nogueiras (Cuba, born 1959)
- Federico Norcia (Italy, 1904–1985)
- Holger Norman-Hansen (Denmark, 1899–1984)
- David Norwood (England, born 1968)
- Daniël Noteboom (Netherlands, 1910–1932)
- Igor Novikov (Ukraine, US, born 1962)
- Nikolay Novotelnov (Russia, 1911–2006)
- Heinz Nowarra (Germany, 1897–c. 1945)
- John Nunn (England, born 1955)
- Friedrich Nürnberg (Germany, 1909–1984)
- Tomi Nybäck (Finland, born 1985)
- Gustaf Nyholm (Sweden, 1880–1957)
- Illia Nyzhnyk (Ukraine, born 1996)

== O ==
- Kevin O'Connell (England, Ireland, born 1949)
- Handszar Odeev (Turkmenistan, born 1972)
- Leif Øgaard (Norway, born 1952)
- John O'Hanlon (Ireland, 1876–1960)
- Tõnu Õim (Estonia, born 1941)
- Kaarle Ojanen (Finland, 1918–2009)
- Albéric O'Kelly de Galway (Belgium, 1911–1980)
- Friðrik Ólafsson (Iceland, 1935–2025)
- Helgi Ólafsson (Iceland, born 1956)
- Mikhailo Oleksienko (Ukraine, born 1986)
- Lembit Oll (Estonia, 1966–1999)
- Adolf Georg Olland (Netherlands, 1867–1933)
- Anton Olson (Sweden, 1881–1967)
- Alexander Onischuk (Ukraine, US, born 1975)
- Karel Opočenský (Czechoslovakia, 1892–1975)
- Wilhelm Orbach (Germany, 1894–1944)
- Menachem Oren (Poland, Israel, 1901–1962)
- Gerard Oskam (Netherlands, 1880–1952)
- Faustino Oro (Argentina, born 2013)
- Berge Østenstad (Norway, born 1964)
- John Owen (England, 1827–1901)
- Karlis Ozols (Latvia, Australia, 1912–2001)

== P ==
- Luděk Pachman (Czechoslovakia, Germany, 1924–2003)
- Nikola Padevsky (Bulgaria, born 1933)
- Elisabeth Pähtz (Germany, born 1985)
- Mladen Palac (Croatia, born 1971)
- Sam Palatnik (Ukraine, US, born 1950)
- Luis Palau (Argentina, 1897–1971)
- Victor Palciauskas (Lithuania, US, born 1941)
- Richard Palliser (England, born 1981)
- Rudolf Palme (Austria, 1910–2005)
- Ryan Palmer (Jamaica, born 1974)
- Davor Palo (Denmark, born 1985)
- Eero Paloheimo (Finland, born 1936)
- Ethan Pang (England, born 2015)
- Oscar Panno (Argentina, born 1935)
- Vasily Panov (Russia, 1906–1973)
- Mark Paragua (Philippines, born 1984)
- Shadi Paridar (Iran, born 1986)
- Mircea Pârligras (Romania, born 1980)
- Bruno Parma (Slovenia, born 1941)
- Frank Parr (England, 1918–2003)
- Louis Paulsen (Germany, 1833–1891)
- Wilfried Paulsen (Germany, 1828–1901)
- Duško Pavasovič (Croatia, Slovenia, born 1976)
- Max Pavey (US, 1918–1957)
- Rahul Srivatshav Peddi (US, born 2002)
- Jiří Pelikán (Czechoslovakia, Argentina, 1906–1985)
- Yannick Pelletier (Switzerland, born 1976)
- Roman Pelts (Ukraine, Canada, born 1937)
- Peng Xiaomin (China, born 1973)
- Peng Zhaoqin (China, born 1968)
- Jonathan Penrose (England, 1933–2021)
- Corina Peptan (Romania, born 1978)
- Julius Perlis (Poland, Austria, 1880–1913)
- Frederick Perrin (England, US, 1815–1889)
- Raaphi Persitz (England, Israel, Switzerland, 1934–2009)
- Nick Pert (England, born 1981)
- John Peters (US, born 1951)
- Jusefs Petkevich (Latvia, born 1940)
- Arshak Petrosian (Armenia, born 1953)
- Davit G. Petrosian (Armenia, born 1984)
- Tigran Petrosian (Armenia, Georgia, USSR, 1929–1984)
- Alexander Petrov (Russia, 1794–1867)
- Vladimirs Petrovs (Latvia, 1907–1943)
- Gerhard Pfeiffer (Germany, 1923–2000)
- Helmut Pfleger (Germany, born 1943)
- François-André Danican Philidor (France, 1726–1795)
- Luis Piazzini (Argentina, 1905–1980)
- Jeroen Piket (Netherlands, born 1969)
- Harry Nelson Pillsbury (US, 1872–1906)
- Hermann Pilnik (Germany, Argentina, 1914–1981)
- Karol Piltz (Poland, 1903–1939)
- Albert Pinkus (US, 1903–1984)
- József Pintér (Hungary, born 1953)
- Vasja Pirc (Slovenia, 1907–1980)
- Rudolf Pitschak (Czechoslovakia, US, 1902–1988)
- Karl Pitschel (Austria, 1829–1883)
- Aaron Pixton (US, born 1986)
- Ján Plachetka (Slovakia, born 1945)
- Albin Planinc (Slovenia, 1944–2008)
- James Plaskett (England, Spain, born 1960)
- Kazimierz Plater (Poland, 1915–2004)
- Igor Platonov (Ukraine, 1934–1995)
- Joseph Platz (Germany, US, 1905–1981)
- Isaías Pleci (Argentina, 1907–1979)
- David Podhorzer (Austria, 1907–1998)
- Natalia Pogonina (Russia, born 1985)
- Henryk Pogorieły (Poland, 1908–1943)
- Ernest Pogosyants (Ukraine, 1935–1990)
- Iosif Pogrebyssky (Ukraine, 1906–1971)
- Amos Pokorný (Czechoslovakia, 1890–1949)
- Rudolph Pokorny (Bohemia, Mexico, US, 1880–after 1920)
- Giulio Polerio (Italy, 1548–1612)
- Judit Polgár (Hungary, born 1976)
- Zsuzsa Polgar (Hungary, US, born 1969)
- Zsofia Polgar (Hungary, Israel, born 1974)
- Elisabeta Polihroniade (Romania, 1935–2016)
- David Polland (US, born 1915)
- William Pollock (United Kingdom, 1859–1896)
- Lev Polugaevsky (Belarus, Russia, 1934–1995)
- Arturo Pomar (Spain, 1931–2016)
- Ruslan Ponomariov (Ukraine, born 1983)
- Domenico Ponziani (Italy, 1719–1796)
- Stepan Popel (Poland, France, US, 1909–1987)
- Ignatz von Popiel (Austria-Hungary, Poland, 1863–1941)
- Petar Popović (Yugoslavia, Serbia, born 1959)
- Artur Popławski (Poland, Switzerland, 1860–1918)
- Yosef Porat (Germany, Israel, 1909–1996)
- Moritz Porges (Bohemia/Austria-Hungary, 1857–1909)
- Atippat Pornariyasombat (Thailand, born 1973)
- Lajos Portisch (Hungary, born 1937)
- Ehrhardt Post (Germany, 1881–1947)
- Evgeny Postny (Israel, born 1981)
- Peter Potemkine (Russia, France, 1886–1926)
- Vladimir Potkin (Russia, born 1982)
- Ludovit Potuček (Slovakia, 1912–1982)
- Christian Poulsen (Denmark, 1912–1981)
- Atousa Pourkashiyan (Iran, born 1988)
- R Praggnanandhaa (India, born 2005)
- Borki Predojević (Bosnia, born 1987)
- Edith Charlotte Price (England, 1872–1952)
- Lodewijk Prins (Netherlands, 1913–1999)
- Luca Protopopescu (France, born 2016)
- Svetlana Prudnikova (Russia, born 1967)
- Dawid Przepiórka (Poland, 1880–1942)
- Lev Psakhis (Russia, Israel, born 1958)
- Lenka Ptáčníková (Czechoslovakia, Iceland, born 1976)
- Stojan Puc (Slovenia, 1921–2004)
- Viktors Pupols (Latvia, US, born 1934)
- Cecil Purdy (New Zealand, Australia, 1906–1979)
- John Purdy (Australia, 1935–2011)

== Q ==
- Qi Jingxuan (China, born 1947)
- Qin Kanying (China, born 1974)
- Oscar Quiñones (Peru, born 1941)
- Miguel Quinteros (Argentina, born 1947)

== R ==
- Braslav Rabar (Croatia, 1919–1973)
- Abram Rabinovich (Lithuania, Russia, 1878–1943)
- Ilya Rabinovich (Russia, 1891–1942)
- Teimour Radjabov (Azerbaijan, born 1987)
- Ivan Radulov (Bulgaria, born 1939)
- Markus Ragger (Austria, born 1988)
- Viacheslav Ragozin (Russia, 1908–1962)
- Ziaur Rahman (Bangladesh, born 1974)
- Maurice Raizman (Moldova/Russia, France, 1905–1974)
- Iweta Rajlich (Poland, born 1981)
- Ramachandran Ramesh (India, born 1976)
- Alejandro Ramírez (Costa Rica, born 1988)
- Richárd Rapport (Hungary, born 1996)
- Nukhim Rashkovsky (Russia, born 1946)
- Ilmar Raud (Estonia, Argentina, 1913–1941)
- Vsevolod Rauzer (Ukraine, 1908–1941)
- Yuri Razuvayev (Russia, 1945–2012)
- Damian Reca (Argentina, 1894–1937)
- Hans Ree (Netherlands, born 1944)
- Brian Reilly (France, England, Ireland, 1901–1991)
- Dimitri Reinderman (Netherlands, born 1972)
- Fred Reinfeld (US, 1910–1964)
- Heinrich Reinhardt (Germany, Argentina, 1903–1990)
- Salome Reischer (Austria, Palestine, US, 1899–1980)
- Teodor Regedziński (Poland, 1894–1954)
- Arturo Reggio (Italy, 1863–1917)
- Josef Rejfíř (Czechoslovakia, 1909–1962)
- Ludwig Rellstab (Germany, 1904–1983)
- Georges Renaud (France, 1893–1975)
- Samuel Reshevsky (Poland, US, 1911–1992)
- Pál Réthy (Hungary, 1905–1962)
- Richard Réti (Austria-Hungary, Czechoslovakia, 1889–1929)
- Ramón Rey Ardid (Spain, 1903–1988)
- Alexander Riazantsev (Russia, born 1985)
- Zoltán Ribli (Hungary, born 1951)
- Pablo Ricardi (Argentina, born 1962)
- Isaac Rice (US, 1850–1915)
- Kurt Richter (Germany, 1900–1969)
- Antonio Rico (Spain, 1908–1988)
- Alessandra Riegler (Italy, born 1961)
- Fritz Riemann (Germany, 1859–1932)
- Friedl Rinder (Germany, 1905–2001)
- Horst Rittner (Germany, 1930–2021)
- Nikolai Riumin (Russia, 1908–1942)
- Jules Arnous de Rivière (France, 1830–1905)
- Karl Robatsch (Austria, 1929–2000)
- Walter Robinow (Germany, 1867–1938)
- Ray Robson (US, born 1994)
- Ludwig Rödl (Germany, 1907–1970)
- Maxim Rodshtein (Israel, born 1989)
- Hans Roepstorff (Germany, 1910–1945)
- Ian Rogers (Australia, born 1960)
- Gustav Rogmann (Germany, 1909–1947)
- Kenneth Rogoff (US, born 1953)
- Dorian Rogozenko (Romania, born 1973)
- Ivan Vladimir Rohaček (Slovakia, 1909–1977)
- Michael Rohde (US, born 1959)
- Michael Roiz (Russia, Israel, born 1983)
- Oleg Romanishin (Ukraine, born 1952)
- Alexander Romanovsky (Lithuania, Russia, 1880–1943)
- Peter Romanovsky (Russia, 1892–1964)
- Max Romih (Croatia, Italy, 1893–1979)
- Chris de Ronde (Netherlands, Argentina, 1912–1996)
- Catharina Roodzant (Netherlands, 1896–1999)
- Salme Rootare (Estonia, 1913–1987)
- Vidrik Rootare (Estonia, c.1900–1985)
- Jakob Rosanes (Ukraine/Austria-Hungary, Germany, 1842–1922)
- Bernardo Roselli (Uruguay, born 1965)
- Leon Rosen (Poland, US, 1869–1942)
- Andreas Rosendahl (Denmark, 1864–1909)
- Karl Wilhelm Rosenkrantz (Latvia, Russia, 1876–1942)
- Jacob Rosenthal (US, 1881–1954)
- Samuel Rosenthal (Poland, France, 1837–1902)
- Laura Ross (US, born 1988)
- Stefano Rosselli del Turco (Italy, 1877–1947)
- Héctor Rossetto (Argentina, 1922–2009)
- Nicolas Rossolimo (Ukraine, France, US, 1910–1975)
- Gersz Rotlewi (Poland, 1889–1920)
- Eugéne Rousseau (France, 1805–1870)
- Jonathan Rowson (Scotland, born 1977)
- Shreyas Royal (India, England, born 2009)
- Solomon Rozental (Lithuania, Belarus, Russia, 1890–1955)
- Eduardas Rozentalis (Lithuania, born 1963)
- Vesna Rožič (Slovenia, 1987–2013)
- Levy Rozman (US, born 1995)
- Ruan Lufei (China, born 1987)
- Serge Rubanraut (China, Australia, 1948–2008)
- Karl Ruben (Denmark, 1903–1938)
- Jorge Rubinetti (Argentina, 1945–2016)
- Akiba Rubinstein (Poland, Germany, Belgium, 1880–1961)
- Emanuel Rubinstein (Poland, 1897–?)
- José Rubinstein (Argentina, 1940–1997)
- Simon Rubinstein (Austria, South Africa, c. 1910–1942)
- Solomon Rubinstein (Poland, US, 1868–1931)
- Sergei Rublevsky (Russia, born 1974)
- Olga Rubtsova (Russia, 1909–1994)
- Iosif Rudakovsky (Ukraine, 1914–1947)
- Lyudmila Rudenko (Ukraine, Russia, 1904–1986)
- Mary Rudge (England, 1842–1919)
- Nikoly Rudnev (Ukraine, Uzbekistan, 1895–1944)
- Anna Rudolf (Hungary, born 1987)
- Alexander Rueb (Netherlands, 1882–1959)
- Mikhail Rytshagov (Estonia, born 1967)

== S ==
- Peter Alexandrovich Saburov (Russia, 1835–1918)
- Peter Petrovich Saburov (Russia, Switzerland, 1880–1932)
- Antonio Sacconi (Italy, 1895–1968)
- Tania Sachdev (India, born 1986)
- Matthew Sadler (England, born 1974)
- Darmen Sadvakasov (Kazakhstan, born 1979)
- Yousof Safvat (Iran, 1940–2003)
- Pierre Charles Fournier de Saint-Amant (France, 1800–1872)
- Jaroslav Šajtar (Czechoslovakia, 1921–2003)
- Konstantin Sakaev (Russia, born 1974)
- Yuri Sakharov (Ukraine, 1922–1981)
- Valery Salov (Russia, born 1964)
- Alessandro Salvio (Italy, c. 1570 – c. 1640)
- Gersz Salwe (Poland, 1862–1920)
- Friedrich (Fritz) Sämisch (Germany, 1896–1975)
- Sergiu Samarian (Romania, Germany, 1923–1991)
- Grigory Sanakoev (Russia, 1935–2021)
- Luis Augusto Sánchez (Colombia, 1917–1981)
- Albert Sandrin Jr. (US, 1923–2004)
- Raúl Sanguineti (Argentina, 1933–2000)
- Anthony Santasiere (US, 1904–1977)
- Emmanuel Sapira (Romania, Belgium, 1900–1943)
- Ortvin Sarapu (Estonia, New Zealand, 1924–1999)
- Jonathan Sarfati (Australia, New Zealand, born 1964)
- Gabriel Sargissian (Armenia, born 1983)
- Ivan Šarić (Croatia, born 1990)
- Nihal Sarin (India, born 2004)
- Zoltan Sarosy (Hungary, Canada, 1906–2017)
- Jacob Sarratt (England, 1772–1819)
- Jeff Sarwer (Canada, born 1978)
- Krishnan Sasikiran (India, born 1981)
- Harold Saunders (England, 1875–1950)
- Stanislav Savchenko (Ukraine, born 1967)
- Vladimir Savon (Ukraine, 1940–2005)
- Gyula Sax (Hungary, 1951–2014)
- Emil Schallopp (Germany, 1843–1919)
- Morris Schapiro (Lithuania, US, 1903–1996)
- Willem Schelfhout (Netherlands, 1874–1951)
- Theodor von Scheve (Germany, 1851–1922)
- Emanuel Schiffers (Russia, 1850–1904)
- Willi Schlage (Germany, 1888–1940)
- Carl Schlechter (Austria, 1874–1918)
- Roland Schmaltz (Germany, born 1974)
- Carl Friedrich Schmid (Latvia, 1840–1897)
- Lothar Schmid (Germany, 1928–2013)
- Paul Felix Schmidt (Estonia, Germany, US, 1916–1984)
- Włodzimierz Schmidt (Poland, born 1943)
- Ludwig Schmitt (Germany, 1902–1980)
- Wilhelm Schönmann (Germany, 1889–1970)
- Georg Schories (Germany, 1874–1934)
- Karl Schorn (Germany, 1803–1850)
- Arnold Schottländer (Germany, 1854–1909)
- František Schubert (Czechoslovakia, 1894–1940)
- John William Schulten (US, 1821–1875)
- Jan Schulz (Czechoslovakia, 1899–1953)
- Aaron Schwartzman (Argentina, 1908–2013)
- Gabriel Schwartzman (Romania, US, born 1976)
- Leon Schwartzmann (Poland, France, 1887–1942)
- Paulette Schwartzmann (Latvia, France, Argentina, 1894–1953?)
- Adolf Schwarz (Hungary, Austria, 1836–1910)
- Jacques Schwarz (Austria, 1856–1921)
- Samuel Schweber (Argentina, 1936–2017)
- Marie Sebag (France, born 1986)
- Yasser Seirawan (Syria, US, born 1960)
- Adolf Seitz (Germany, Argentina, 1898–1970)
- Alexey Selezniev (Russia, France, 1888–1967)
- Lidia Semenova (Ukraine, born 1951)
- Olav Sepp (Estonia, born 1969)
- Edward Guthlac Sergeant (England, 1881–1961)
- Philip Walsingham Sergeant (England, 1872–1952)
- Aleksandr Sergeyev (Russia, 1897–1970)
- Dražen Sermek (Slovenia, born 1969)
- Gregory Serper (Uzbekistan, US, born 1969)
- Samuel Sevian (US, born 2000)
- Alexander Shabalov (Latvia, US, born 1967)
- Eglantina Shabanaj (Albania, born 1979)
- Greg Shahade (US, born 1978)
- Jennifer Shahade (US, born 1980)
- Leonid Shamkovich (Russia, Israel, US, 1923–2005)
- Gauri Shankar (India, born 1992)
- Samuel Shankland (US, born 1991)
- Andrey Shariyazdanov (Russia, born 1976)
- Elizabeth Shaughnessy (Ireland, US, born 1937)
- Shen Yang (China, born 1989)
- James Sherwin (US, England, born 1933)
- Sergei Shipov (Russia, born 1966)
- Kamran Shirazi (Iran, US, France, born 1952)
- Alexei Shirov (Latvia, Spain, born 1972)
- Roman Shogdzhiev (Russia, born 2015)
- Nigel Short (England, born 1965)
- Jackson Showalter (US, 1860–1935)
- Yury Shulman (Belarus, US, born 1975)
- Ilya Shumov (Russia, 1819–1881)
- Polina Shuvalova (Russia, born 2001)
- Félix Sicre (Cuba, 1817–1871)
- Bruno Edgar Siegheim (Germany, South Africa, 1875–1952)
- Guðmundur Sigurjónsson (Iceland, born 1947)
- Jeremy Silman (US, 1954–2023)
- Vladimir Simagin (Russia, 1919–1968)
- Albert Simonson (US, 1914–1965)
- Amon Simutowe (Zambia, born 1982)
- Javokhir Sindarov (Uzbekistani, born 2005)
- Marcel Sisniega Campbell (Mexico, 1959–2013)
- Stanislaus Sittenfeld (Poland, France, 1865–1902)
- Bodhana Sivanandan (England, born 2015)
- Sanan Sjugirov (Russia, born 1993)
- Karel Skalička (Czechoslovakia, Argentina, 1896–1979)
- Almira Skripchenko (Moldova, France, born 1976)
- Bogdan Śliwa (Poland, 1922–2003)
- Sam Sloan (United States, born 1944)
- Roman Slobodjan (Germany, born 1975)
- Jørn Sloth (Denmark, born 1944)
- Jan Smeets (Netherlands, born 1985)
- Jan Smejkal (Czechoslovakia, born 1946)
- David Smerdon (Australia, born 1984)
- Shlomo Smiltiner (Israel, 1915–2015)
- Ilya Smirin (Belarus, Israel, born 1968)
- Pavel Smirnov (Russia, born 1982)
- Stephen Francis Smith (Canada, England, 1861–1928)
- Vasily Osipovich Smyslov (Russia, 1881–1943)
- Vasily Smyslov (Russia, 1921–2010)
- Wesley So (Philippines, born 1993)
- Bartosz Soćko (Poland, born 1978)
- Monika Soćko (Poland, born 1978)
- Andrei Sokolov (Russia, France, born 1963)
- Ivan Sokolov (Bosnia, Netherlands, born 1968)
- Alexey Sokolsky (Russia, Ukraine, Belarus, 1908–1969)
- Dragan Šolak (Serbia, born 1980)
- Alexander Solovtsov (Russia, 1847–1923)
- Andrew Soltis (US, born 1947)
- Julien Song (France, born 1993)
- Ariel Sorín (Argentina, born 1967)
- Genna Sosonko (Russia, Netherlands, born 1943)
- Victor Soultanbeieff (Russia, Belgium, 1895–1972)
- Vladimir Sournin (Russia, US, 1875–1942)
- João de Souza Mendes (Brazil, 1892–1969)
- Hugo Spangenberg (Argentina, born 1975)
- Vasil Spasov (Bulgaria, born 1971)
- Boris Spassky (Russia, France, 1937–2025)
- Jon Speelman (England, born 1956)
- Abraham Speijer (Netherlands, 1873–1956)
- Rudolf Spielmann (Austria, Sweden, 1883–1942)
- Kevin Spraggett (Canada, born 1954)
- Ana Srebrnič (Slovenia, born 1984)
- Gideon Ståhlberg (Sweden, 1908–1967)
- Wilhelm von Stamm (Latvia, before 1899–1905)
- Philipp Stamma (Syria, England, France, 1705–1755)
- Fabian Stanach (Poland, born 1980)
- Nikolaus Stanec (Austria, born 1968)
- Charles Stanley (England, US, 1819–1901)
- Nava Starr (Latvia, Canada, born 1949)
- Howard Staunton (England, 1810–1874)
- Michael Stean (England, born 1953)
- Antoaneta Stefanova (Bulgaria, born 1979)
- Hannes Stefánsson (Iceland, born 1972)
- Elias Stein (Alsace, Netherlands, 1748–1812)
- Leonid Stein (Ukraine, 1934–1973)
- Endre Steiner (Hungary, 1901–1944)
- Lajos Steiner (Hungary, Australia, 1903–1975)
- Herman Steiner (Slovakia/Hungary, US, 1905–1955)
- Wilhelm Steinitz (Bohemia, Austria, England, US, 1836–1900)
- Daniël Stellwagen (Netherlands, born 1987)
- Károly Sterk (Hungary, 1881–1946)
- Adolf Stern (Germany, 1849–1907)
- Agnes Stevenson (England, before 1901–1935)
- Lara Stock (Croatia, born 1992)
- Mark Stolberg (Russia, 1922–1943)
- Gösta Stoltz (Sweden, 1904–1963)
- Leon Stolzenberg (Poland, US, 1895–1974)
- Zurab Sturua (Georgia, born 1959)
- Mihai Șubă (Romania, born 1947)
- Mladen Šubarić (Croatia, 1908–1991)
- Hugo Süchting (Germany, 1874–1916)
- Alexey Suetin (Russia, 1926–2001)
- Berthold Suhle (Poland, Germany, 1837–1904)
- Franciszek Sulik (Poland, Argentina, Australia, 1908–2000)
- Šarūnas Šulskis (Lithuania, born 1972)
- Aaron Summerscale (England, born 1969)
- Anne Sunnucks (England, 1927–2014)
- Jaime Sunye Neto (Brazil, born 1957)
- Emil Sutovsky (Azerbaijan, Israel, born 1977)
- Duncan Suttles (Canada, born 1945)
- Evgeny Sveshnikov (Latvia, 1950–2021)
- Dmitry Svetushkin (Moldova, 1980–2020)
- Peter Svidler (Russia, born 1976)
- Rudolf Swiderski (Germany, 1878–1909)
- Eugenio Szabados (Hungary, Italy, 1898–1974)
- László Szabó (Hungary, 1917–1998)
- Gedali Szapiro (Poland, Israel, 1929–1972)
- Salomon Szapiro (Poland, 1882–1944)
- Rudolph Sze (China, US, c.1890–1938)
- József Szén (Hungary, 1805–1857)
- József Szily (Hungary, 1913–1976)
- Jorge Szmetan (Argentina, 1950–2015)
- Aleksander Sznapik (Poland, born 1951)
- Abram Szpiro (Germany, Poland, 1912–1943)

== T ==
- Mark Taimanov (Ukraine, Russia, 1926–2016)
- Sándor Takács (Hungary, 1893–1932)
- Mikhail Tal (Latvia, 1936–1992)
- Tan Chengxuan (China, born 1963)
- Hiong Liong Tan (Indonesia, Netherlands, 1938–2009)
- Lian Ann Tan (Singapore, born 1947)
- Tan Zhongyi (China, born 1991)
- László Tapasztó (Hungary, Venezuela, US, born 1930)
- James Tarjan (US, born 1952)
- Siegbert Tarrasch (Germany, 1862–1934)
- Savielly Tartakower (Austria/Poland, France, 1887–1956)
- Emory Tate (United States, 1958-2015)
- Jean Taubenhaus (Poland, France, 1850–1919)
- Lev Taussig (Czechoslovakia, 1880–?)
- Povilas Tautvaišas (Lithuania, US, 1916–1980)
- Jan Willem te Kolsté (Netherlands, 1874–1936)
- Richard Teichmann (Germany, 1868–1925)
- Oscar Tenner (Germany, US, 1880–1948)
- Rudolf Teschner (Germany, 1922–2006)
- Vitaly Teterev (Belarus, born 1983)
- Praveen Thipsay (India, born 1959)
- Murugan Thiruchelvam (England, born 1988)
- George Alan Thomas (Turkey, England, 1881–1972)
- James Thompson (England, US, 1804–1870)
- Theophilus Thompson (US, 1855–1881)
- Tian Tian (China, born 1983)
- Viktor Tietz (Czechoslovakia, 1859–1937)
- Hans Tikkanen (Sweden, born 1985)
- Jan Timman (Netherlands, 1951-2026)
- Gert Jan Timmerman (Netherlands, born 1956)
- Artyom Timofeev (Russia, born 1985)
- Samuel Tinsley (England, 1847–1903)
- Sergei Tiviakov (Russia, Netherlands, born 1973)
- Jonathan Tisdall (US, Norway, born 1958)
- Vladislav Tkachiev (Russia, Kazakhstan, France, born 1973)
- Miodrag Todorcevic (Serbia, France, born 1940)
- Alexander Tolush (Russia, 1910–1969)
- Evgeny Tomashevsky (Russia, born 1987)
- Vasilije Tomović (Montenegro, 1906–?)
- Tong Yuanming (China, born 1972)
- Alice Tonini (Italy, ?)
- Veselin Topalov (Bulgaria, born 1975)
- Eugenio Torre (Philippines, born 1951)
- Carlos Torre Repetto (México, 1904–1978)
- Yury Toshev (Bulgaria, 1907–1974)
- Izaak Towbin (Ukraine, Poland, 1899–1941)
- Karel Traxler (Czechoslovakia, 1866–1936)
- Lawrence Trent (England, born 1986)
- František Treybal (Czechoslovakia, 1882–1942)
- Karel Treybal (Czechoslovakia, 1885–1941)
- George Treysman (US, 1881–1959)
- Petar Trifunović (Croatia, Serbia, 1910–1980)
- Georgi Tringov (Bulgaria, 1937–2000)
- Paul Truong (Vietnam, US, born 1965)
- Cindy Tsai (US, born 1985)
- Anatol Tschepurnoff (Finland, 1871–1942)
- Mark Tseitlin (Russia, Israel, born 1943)
- Mikhail Tseitlin (Belarus, Russia, born 1947)
- Vitaly Tseshkovsky (Russia, 1944–2011)
- Alexander Tsvetkov (Bulgaria, 1914–1990)
- Leon Tuhan-Baranowski (Poland, Germany, 1907–1954)
- Vladimir Tukmakov (Ukraine, born 1946)
- Johannes Türn (Estonia, 1899–1993)
- Abe Turner (US, 1924–1962)
- Maxim Turov (Russia, born 1979)
- Isador Samuel Turover (Belgium, US, 1892–1978)
- Theodore Tylor (England, 1900–1968)
- Dimitri Tyomkin (Canada, born 1977)
- Alexandru Tyroler (Romania, 1891–1990)

== U ==
- Louis Uedemann (US, 1854–1912)
- Shinsaku Uesugi (Japan, born 1991)
- Wolfgang Uhlmann (Germany, 1935–2020)
- Tüdeviin Üitümen (Mongolia, 1939–1993)
- Maximilián Ujtelky (Hungary/Slovakia, 1915–1979)
- Mikhail Ulibin (Russia, born 1971)
- Mikhail Umansky (Russia, 1952–2010)
- Wolfgang Unzicker (Germany, 1925–2006)
- Anna Ushenina (Ukraine, born 1985)

== V ==
- Maxime Vachier-Lagrave (France, born 1990)
- Rafael Vaganian (Armenia, born 1951)
- Samuil Vainshtein (Russia, 1894–1942)
- R Vaishali (India, born 2003)
- Anatoly Vaisser (Kazakhstan, France, born 1949)
- Povilas Vaitonis (Lithuania, Canada, 1911–1983)
- Árpád Vajda (Hungary, 1896–1967)
- Francisco Vallejo Pons (Spain, born 1982)
- Michael Valvo (US, 1942–2004)
- Johannes van den Bosch (Netherlands, 1906–1994)
- Arnold van den Hoek (Netherlands, 1921–1945)
- Paul van der Sterren (Netherlands, born 1956)
- John van der Wiel (Netherlands, born 1959)
- Dirk van Foreest (Netherlands, 1862–1956)
- Jorden van Foreest (Netherlands, born 1999)
- Lucas van Foreest (Netherlands, born 2001)
- Norman van Lennep (Netherlands, 1872–1897)
- Herman Claudius van Riemsdijk (Netherlands, Brazil, born 1948)
- Theo van Scheltinga (Netherlands, 1914–1994)
- Louis van Vliet (Netherlands, 1870–1932)
- Loek van Wely (Netherlands, born 1972)
- Cyril Vansittart (England, Italy, 1852–1887)
- Zoltán Varga (Hungary, born 1970)
- Egon Varnusz (Hungary, 1933–2008)
- Evgeni Vasiukov (Russia, 1933–2018)
- Petar Velikov (Bulgaria, born 1951)
- Dragoljub Velimirović (Serbia, 1942–2014)
- Gavriil Veresov (Russia, 1912–1979)
- Beniamino Vergani (Italy, 1863–1927)
- Giovanni Vescovi (Brazil, born 1978)
- Boris Verlinsky (Ukraine, Russia, 1888–1950)
- Milan Vidmar (Slovenia, 1885–1962)
- Milan Vidmar Jr. (Slovenia, 1909–1980)
- Subbaraman Vijayalakshmi (India, born 1979)
- Benito Villegas (Argentina, 1877–1952)
- Yakov Vilner (Ukraine, 1899–1931)
- William Samuel Viner (Australia, 1881–1933)
- Fernando Visier Segovia (Spain, born 1943)
- Isakas Vistaneckis (Lithuania, Israel, 1910–2000)
- Nikita Vitiugov (Russia, born 1987)
- Alvis Vītoliņš (Latvia, 1946–1997)
- Evgeny Vladimirov (Kazakhstan, born 1957)
- Erwin Voellmy (Switzerland, 1886–1951)
- Sergey Volkov (Russia, born 1974)
- Andrei Volokitin (Ukraine, born 1986)
- Larissa Volpert (Russia, 1926–2017)
- Andrey Vovk (Ukraine, born 1991)
- Yuri Vovk (Ukraine, born 1988)
- Zvonko Vranesic (Croatia, Canada, born 1938)
- Milan Vukcevich (Serbia, US, 1937–2003)
- Milan Vukić (Serbia, Bosnia, born 1942)
- Vladimir Vuković (Croatia, 1898–1975)
- Konstantin Vygodchikov (Belarus, Russia, 1892–1941)
- Alexey Vyzmanavin (Russia, 1960–2000)

== W ==
- Robert Wade (New Zealand, England, 1921–2008)
- Alexander Wagner (Poland, 1868–1942)
- Heinrich Wagner (Germany, 1888–1959)
- Victor Wahltuch (England, 1875–1953)
- Josh Waitzkin (United States, born 1976)
- Carl August Walbrodt (Netherlands, Germany, 1871–1902)
- George Walker (England, 1803–1879)
- Max Walter (Slovakia, 1896–1940)
- Wang Hao (China, born 1989)
- Wang Lei (China, born 1975)
- Wang Pin (China, born 1974)
- Puchen Wang (China, New Zealand, born 1990)
- Wang Rui (China, born 1978)
- Wang Yu (China, born 1982)
- Wang Yue (China, born 1987)
- Chris Ward (England, born 1968)
- Preston Ware (US, 1821–1891)
- Cathy Warwick (England, born 1968)
- Miyoko Watai (Japan, born 1945)
- John L. Watson (US, born 1951)
- William Watson (England, born 1962)
- William Wayte (England, 1829–1898)
- Simon Webb (England, 1949–2005)
- Tom Wedberg (Sweden, born 1953)
- Henri Weenink (Netherlands, 1892–1931)
- Otto Wegemund (Germany, 1870–1928)
- Wei Yi (China, born 1999)
- Wolfgang Weil (Austria, 1912–1945)
- Max Weiss (Hungary, Austria, 1857–1927)
- Peter Wells (England, born 1965)
- Carl Wemmers (Germany, 1845–1882)
- Wen Yang (China, born 1988)
- Jan Werle (Netherlands, born 1984)
- Guy West (Australia, born 1958)
- Heikki Westerinen (Finland, born 1944)
- Bernardo Wexler (Romania, Argentina, 1925–1992)
- Kasimir de Weydlich (Poland, 1859–1913)
- Norman Tweed Whitaker (US, 1890–1975)
- Michael Wiedenkeller (Sweden, born 1963)
- Arthur Wijnans (Indonesia, Netherlands, 1920–1945)
- Elijah Williams (England, 1810–1854)
- Simon Williams (England, born 1979)
- Szymon Winawer (Poland, 1838–1920)
- Karl Gottlieb von Windisch (Slovakia, Hungary, Austria, 1725–1793)
- Peter Winston (US, born 1958)
- William Winter (England, 1898–1955)
- Victor Winz (Germany, Israel, Argentina, 1906–?)
- John Wisker (England, 1846–1884)
- Alexander Wittek (Croatia, Austria, 1852–1894)
- Aleksandar Wohl (Australia, born 1963)
- Antoni Wojciechowski (Poland, 1905–1938)
- Radosław Wojtaszek (Poland, born 1987)
- Aleksander Wojtkiewicz (Latvia, Poland, US, 1963–2006)
- Heinrich Wolf (Austria, 1875–1943)
- Siegfried Reginald Wolf (Austria, Israel, 1867–1951)
- Paula Wolf-Kalmar (Austria, 1881–1931)
- Balduin Wolff (Germany, 1819–1907)
- Patrick Wolff (US, born 1968)
- Wong Meng Kong (Singapore, born 1963)
- Baruch Harold Wood (England, 1909–1989)
- Wu Mingqian (China, born 1961)
- Wu Shaobin (Singapore, born 1969)
- Wu Wenjin (China, born 1976)
- Marmaduke Wyvill (England, 1814–1896)

== X ==
- Xie Jun (China, born 1970)
- Jeffery Xiong (US, born 2000)
- Xu Jun (China, born 1962)
- Xu Yuanyuan (China, born 1981)
- Xu Yuhua (China, born 1976)

== Y ==
- Yuri Yakovich (Russia, born 1962)
- Daniel Yanofsky (Poland, Canada, 1925–2000)
- Frederick Yates (England, 1884–1932)
- Ye Jiangchuan (China, born 1960)
- Ye Rongguang (China, born 1963)
- Olavo Yépez (Ecuador, 1937–2021)
- Trotzky Yepez (Ecuador, 1940–2010)
- Alex Yermolinsky (US, born 1958)
- Betül Cemre Yıldız (Turkey, born 1989)
- Yin Hao (China, born 1979)
- Carissa Yip (US, born 2003)
- Jennifer Yu (US, born 2002)
- Yu Shaoteng (China, born 1979)
- Leonid Yudasin (Russia, Israel, born 1959)
- Mikhail Yudovich (Russia, 1911–1987)
- Peter Yurdansky (Russia, 1891–1937)
- Artur Yusupov (Russia, Germany, born 1960)

== Z ==
- Józef Żabiński (Poland, 1860–1928)
- Aron Zabłudowski (Poland, 1909–1941)
- Aldo Zadrima (Albania, born 1948)
- Vladimir Zagorovsky (Russia, 1925–1994)
- Sergey Zagrebelny (Uzbekistan, born 1965)
- Alexander Zaitsev (Russia, 1935–1971)
- Igor Zaitsev (Russia, born 1938)
- Lazar Zalkind (Ukraine, 1886–1945)
- Oswaldo Zambrana (Bolivia, born 1981)
- Abram Zamikhovsky (Ukraine, 1908–1978)
- Alonso Zapata (Colombia, born 1958)
- Pablo Zarnicki (Argentina, born 1972)
- Anna Zatonskih (Ukraine, US, born 1978)
- Tatiana Zatulovskaya (Azerbaijan, Russia, Israel, 1935–2017)
- Beata Zawadzka (Poland, born 1986)
- Jolanta Zawadzka (Poland, born 1987)
- Patrick Zelbel (Germany, born 1993)
- Elmārs Zemgalis (Latvia, US, 1923–2014)
- Zhang Jilin (China, born 1986)
- Zhang Pengxiang (China, born 1980)
- Zhang Weida (China, born 1949)
- Zhang Xiaowen (China, born 1989)
- Zhang Zhong (China, Singapore, born 1978)
- Zhao Jun (China, born 1986)
- Zhao Lan (China, born 1963)
- Zhao Xue (China, born 1985)
- Zhao Zong-Yuan (China, Australia, born 1986)
- Viktor Zheliandinov (Ukraine, 1935–2021)
- Zhou Jianchao (China, born 1988)
- Zhou Weiqi (China, born 1986)
- Zhu Chen (China, born 1976)
- Natalia Zhukova (Ukraine, born 1979)
- Yaacov Zilberman (Israel, born 1954)
- Otto Zimmermann (Switzerland, 1892–1979)
- Adolf Zinkl (Bohemia, Austria, 1871–1944)
- Emil Zinner (Czechoslovakia, 1909–1942)
- František Zíta (Czechoslovakia, 1909–1977)
- Eugene Znosko-Borovsky (Russia, France, 1884–1954)
- Leo Zobel (Slovakia, 1895–1962)
- Alexander Zubarev (Ukraine, born 1979)
- Nikolai Zubarev (Russia, 1894–1951)
- Bernard Zuckerman (US, born 1943)
- Igor Zugic (Canada, born 1981)
- Johannes Zukertort (Poland, Germany, England, 1842–1888)
- Vadim Zvjaginsev (Russia, born 1976)
- Kira Zvorykina (Ukraine, Russia, Belarus, 1919–2014)
- Adolf Zytogorski (Poland, England, c. 1811/1812–1882)

== Computers ==
- HAL 9000, fictional AI (see "Poole versus HAL 9000")
- Deep Blue, the IBM chess playing computer, was victorious in a 1997 match against then-world champion Garry Kasparov.
  - Deep Thought, an earlier version of Deep Blue, won many computer chess championships.
- Deep Fritz achieved a draw in the 2002 match, "Brains in Bahrain", against Vladimir Kramnik. A variant, X3D Fritz, drew against Kasparov in 2004, and the version Deep Fritz 10 defeated the world champion Vladimir Kramnik in 2006.
- Houdini (chess) Since the release of version 1.5 on 15 December 2010, it has taken the top spot in every rating list that includes it.
- Hydra (chess) is a very strong machine which uses custom parallel hardware.
- Junior is the winner of the 2006 World Computer Chess Championship, its third victory at this event.
- Rybka is an engine. As of December 2006, Rybka has topped all chess engine rating lists and won the 2007 WCCC.
- Shredder is another strong program, having won the WCCC twice.

== See also ==
- List of Armenian chess players
- List of Indian chess players
- List of Israeli chess players
- List of Russian chess players
- List of female chess players
- List of chess grandmasters
- List of amateur chess players
- List of chess players by peak FIDE rating
