= Bhupendra Niraula =

Nepali chess player (born 1981)

Personal information
- Born: 1981 (age 44–45)

Chess career
- Country: Nepal
- Title: Candidate Master (2015)
- Peak rating: 2071 (June 2016)

Bhupendra Niraula (born 1981) is a Nepalese chess player. He has held the title of FIDE Instructor since 2014 and the FIDE title of Candidate Master (CM) since 2015. He received the CM title at a zonal tournament in 2015. Niraula won the 19th National Individual Championship organized by the Nepal Chess Federation in 2016 with 7.0 out of 9 points. At the 2016 Chess Olympiad in Baku, he represented his country for the first time in the most important chess team tournament.

His Elo rating is 1963 (as of July 2024), which puts him in twelfth place in the Nepalese Elo rankings. His highest Elo rating was 2071 in June 2016.

== See also ==
- List of chess players
