= Simon Rubinstein =

Simon Rubinstein may refer to:

- Simon Rubinstein (chess player) (c. 1910–1942), Austrian chess master
- Simon Rubinstein (pimp) (c. 1880–1965), Argentine businessman and pimp
