= Laura Ross =

Laura Ross may refer to:

- Laura Ross (chess player), American chess player
- Laura Ross (politician), Canadian politician
