= George Treysman =

American chess player (1881–1959)

George Nelson Treysman (1881 – New York City, February 1959) was an American chess Master.

== Biography ==
George Nelson Treysman was primarily a coffee-house chess hustler who made his living by betting on games, usually offering material odds to his amateur chess opponents. His main base was the Stuyvesant Chess Club, located on the Lower East Side of Manhattan in New York City. Denker called Treysman the best odds-giver at chess in the United States.

He played very little formal tournament chess in his life, except for a brief period in the mid-1930s, when he was already 55 years old. He qualified for the 1936 United States Chess Championship finals in New York City, and scored 10.5/15, for a tied 3rd–4th place, only one point out of first; the winner was Samuel Reshevsky In this tournament, Treysman defeated established stars such as Isaac Kashdan, Arthur Dake, Alexander Kevitz, Herman Steiner, and Arnold Denker.

Treysman qualified for the finals at the 1937 U.S. Open Chess Championship / Western Open in Chicago, where he placed tied 3rd-4th with 6/10; the winner was David Polland. Then in 1938, Treysman again played in the U.S. Championship at New York, where he scored 7/16 for a tied 10–11th place, as Reshevsky won again.

Treysman's chess style and escapades were also described in the book The World of Chess, by Anthony Saidy and Norman Lessing, published by Random House, New York 1974. Lessing, himself a Master who faced Treysman many times and knew him well, credits him as a formidable player, and a great character.

When the inaugural rating list for the United States Chess Federation was published in 1950, Treysman was rated 2521, which was higher than young star Larry Evans (2484). Treysman suffered with throat cancer for the last portion of his life, and died of this disease in 1959.
