= Cyril Vansittart =

English-Italian chess player

Cyril Bexley Vansittart (1852 – 22 January 1887) was an English–Italian chess master.

Born in London, he moved to Rome in 1860, later establishing a bank there. He twice participated in unofficial Italian Chess Championships (Torneo Nazionale), taking 6th at Livorno 1878 (the 2nd Italian National Tournament, Luigi Sprega won); at Venice 1883 he only played the first half, though his second half games were not counted as forfeits. Vansittart tied for 18-19th at London 1883 (Vizayanagaram Tournament, Curt von Bardeleben won).

By the early 1880s, Vansittart had a chess library of around 300 volumes, and in 1883 he purchased the 400-volume library of the late Count Salimbeni. The library contained books and periodicals and had complete runs of the Chess Player's Chronicle, Le Palamède and Deutsche Schachzeitung. Hoffer stated in the Chess Monthly in 1887 that Vansittart had died of heart disease aged 35; Adriano Chicco said in the Dizionario Enciclopedico Degli Scacchi that there was a triple suicide that shocked Rome.
