= Jessica Lauser =

American chess player (born 1980)

Personal information
- Born: 1980 (age 45–46)

Chess career
- Country: United States
- Peak rating: 1827 (October 2024)

Jessica T. Lauser (/LAWser/, born 1980) is a visually-impaired American chess player and the current, six-time reigning U.S. Blind Champion. As of 2025, she is the first and only woman to win the US national chess championship for the blind and visually-impaired in 2018. Lauser has since won five more championships in 2019, 2020, 2021 (by default), 2022, and 2024.

== Early life ==
Born at just 24 weeks’ gestation, Lauser suffered a serious complication affecting premature infants, named Retinopathy of Prematurity (ROP), causing permanent and severe loss of sight during her first few months of life. ROP (and subsequent cataracts) left Lauser effectively blind in one eye, with limited sight in the other. Lauser first learned chess at age 7, and started playing more frequently at around 12, where she allegedly used her chess skills to counter teasing and bullying by classmates throughout her time in junior secondary education, during which she earned the moniker "Chessica" in her school.

== Career ==
Lauser began competing at age 13, but didn’t have access to regular tournaments until adulthood, primarily due to her living in a remote location and having only limited access to an active chess club or the Internet during her childhood. Having played a total of 469 USCF-rated tournaments, Lauser is ranked on the national Top Ten Player lists (including fully-sighted competitors). Lauser frequents multiple chess websites, including Chess.com, Lichess and the FIDE Online Arena.

In November 2020, Lauser joined TeamUSA which took part in the 1st FIDE Online Olympiad for People with Disabilities. TeamUSA, which included members with conditions other than visual impairment, was initially seeded 39th in this event, but finished tied for tenth position globally (and placing sixteenth on tiebreaks). Lauser's participation in the team secured TeamUSA's eligibility to participate in the tournament, since every team required at least one woman to play all nine rounds. Lauser was the strongest female chess player to qualify, as well as the only member of the team to hold a title recognised by FIDE (Arena FIDE Master), which made Lauser a target, as every team the U.S. faced switched its roster accordingly.

In November 2021, Lauser took part in the 4th World Championship for People with Disabilities, which was held online due to the COVID-19 pandemic, in a team of four American participants, of which she was the only woman. During this event, she drew against several-time Female Blind World Champion, WFM Anna Stolarczyk.

Lauser subsequently participated in two Pan-American Championships organised by the International Braille Chess Association Pan-American Championships, held in Mexico in 2022 and in Guatemala in 2023, where she won women’s silver and women’s gold, respectively, placing 4th overall in both events. Lauser then competed in Puebla, Mexico, in autumn 2024, ranking first place among the women and 4th overall, in the 1st International Championship for Blind & Visually Impaired.

From September 27 to October 7, 2024, Lauser ranked 5th in the 12th IBCA Women's World Championship, held in Bangalore, India. She also won a gold medal and overall silver in the women's category of the 12th IBCA Pan-American Championship, hosted in Salinas, Ecuador, from October 20 to 25, 2024, after which she became the only participant out of 37 to win two distinctions.

Lauser recently took part in the 2025 Pan-American Amateur Championship, held in San Pedro Sula, Honduras, from June 22 to 29, where she finished 3rd amongst all female participants in the U2000 category, and was awarded a trophy and the FIDE direct title of Women’s Candidate Master (WCM).
