= Alvaro Dias Huizar =

Venezuelan chess player (born 1980)

- Huízar at Secretariat of the Interior in 2025

Personal information
- Born: July 28, 1980 (age 46)

Chess career
- Country: Venezuela
- Title: FIDE Master (2013)
- Peak rating: 2409 (October 2019)

Alvaro Dias Huizar (born July 28, 1980) is a Mexican-Venezuelan chess player. Acoording to International Chess Federation he has been 2nd ranked of Venezuela and one of the strongest players in Americas continent. He has got high score and win several open local tournaments.

== Career ==
He is an attorney specializing in Criminal Law from the University of Nantes and Southampton. He was part of principal advisors in the Attorney General of Mexico office during the Alejandro Gertz Manero´s term. He was referenced as a speaker at the Supreme Court of Mexico.

== Books ==
- Unknown champion. A collection of games related to my repertoire. ISBN 978-607-00-8349-5.
- The prosecution of justice in Mexico. ISBN 978-607-00-8349-5.
