= Vladimir Afromeev =

Russian businessman and chess player (born 1954)

Personal information
- Born: 2 April 1954 (age 72) Magadan, Russia

Chess career
- Country: Russia
- Title: FIDE Master (2001)
- FIDE rating: 2603 (August 2026)
- Peak rating: 2646 (October 2007)
- Peak ranking: No. 66 (October 2007)

Vladimir Afromeev (born 2 April 1954) is a Russian businessman and chess player.

== Biography ==
In the mid-2000s, Afromeev gained improvements in his official FIDE Elo rating that were highly unusual for his age, breaking into the world top 100 at the age of 52 in July 2006. In October 2007, he achieved a rating of 2646 and ranked 66th in the world. Several authors questioned Afromeev's rise and suggested that it was due to Afromeev organizing tournaments in which he either played far lower-rated opponents or scored unusually quick wins against strong opponents, and even that some of the tournaments did not in fact take place. Afromeev denied these charges, putting them down to people being jealous because of his wealth.
