= Nepal Chess Federation =

National chess governing body in Nepal

- Abbreviation: NCF
- Formation: 1979
- Type: Sports federation
- Headquarters: Kathmandu, Nepal
- Region served: Nepal
- Official language: Nepali, English
- President: Dhruba Bahadur Pradhan
- Affiliations: FIDE, Asian Chess Federation

Nepal Chess Federation (NCF) is the national governing body for the sport of chess in Nepal. and representing Nepal in international chess events.

== History ==
The federation was established in 1979 and became affiliated with the Fédération Internationale des Échecs (FIDE), Th international chess federation, in the same year. Since its inception, the NCF has worked to develop the sport throughout the country and improve the standard of Nepali chess players.
