= Mehrdad Ardeshi =

Iranian chess player

Personal information
- Born: 1 January 1979 (age 47) Tehran, Iran

Chess career
- Country: Iran
- Title: International Master (2007)
- Peak rating: 2421 (January 2007)

Mehrdad Ardeshi (Persian: مهرداد اردشی) is an Iranian chess International Master born on January 1, 1979, in Tehran, Iran. He is also the coach of the Iranian national youth chess team.

== Early life ==
Mehrdad Ardeshi was interested in chess since he was a teenager, but his father strongly forbid him from doing so that as not to damage his studies, but he continued to try. After the death of his father in 1997, he continued in this field with the support of his mother, and after marriage, his wife became his second supporter in this field. He is also a close friend of Morteza Mahjoub and uncle of Iranian filmmaker Danial Hajibarat.

== Professional activity ==
Ardeshi is the head coach of the Iranian Chess national youth team, and in 2020, won the third place in the World Junior Chess Championship held online in Georgia. He is the chairman of the training committee of the Iranian Chess Federation, a member of the Iranian national team, and a participant in the World Chess Olympiad that It was the last year that Garry Kasparov was present.

Mehrdad Ardeshi is Champion of the West Asian Qualifiers, the first joint winner of the international competitions of the Fajr decade, two years champion of the Iranian Premier League with Bahman and Railway teams, 4 years individual champion of the Iranian Premier League.
