= Alexander Ferdinand von der Goltz =

German chess player

Alexander Ferdinand von der Goltz (1819–1858) was a German chess master.

Born in Prussia, he studied philology at University of Bonn, and was a friend of Tassilo von Heydebrand und der Lasa. After his study, von der Goltz served as a Prussian officer in Koblenz till 1848, and became one of the strongest chess players in Rhineland. During his visits in Berlin, he lost some matches to famous members of the Berlin Pleiades (Das Berliner Siebengestirn): von der Lasa (1 : 6) in 1837, Carl Mayet (9.5 : 14.5) and Wilhelm Hanstein (5 : 12) in 1847.
