= Peter Leepin =

Swiss chess player (1920–1995)

Peter Leepin (21 November 1920 in Basel – 24 July 1995) was a Swiss chess master.

He took 16th place at Munich 1941, where Gösta Stoltz won, took 4th in the Swiss Chess Championship at Lucerne 1950, where Hans Johner won, and won the Coupe Suisse twice.

Leepin played for Switzerland in friendly matches against France in 1946, Yugoslavia in 1949, and Saarland in 1955.
