= Moritz Billecard =

French chess player

Maurice (Moritz) Billecard (3 August 1876, in Lure – 8 December 1940) was a French chess master.

He tied for 7-8th at Paris 1896 (Dawid Janowski won), tied for 14-15th at Munich 1900 (the 12th DSB Congress, Géza Maróczy, Harry Pillsbury and Carl Schlechter won), took 4th at Paris 1901 (Quadrangular, Adolf Albin and Stanislaus Sittenfeld won), withdrew from the 1902 Monte Carlo chess tournament, and took 20th in the Ostend 1907 chess tournament (Masters' Tournament, Ossip Bernstein and Akiba Rubinstein won).

He lived in Algeria.
