= Arthur Bisguier =

American chess grandmaster (1929–2017)

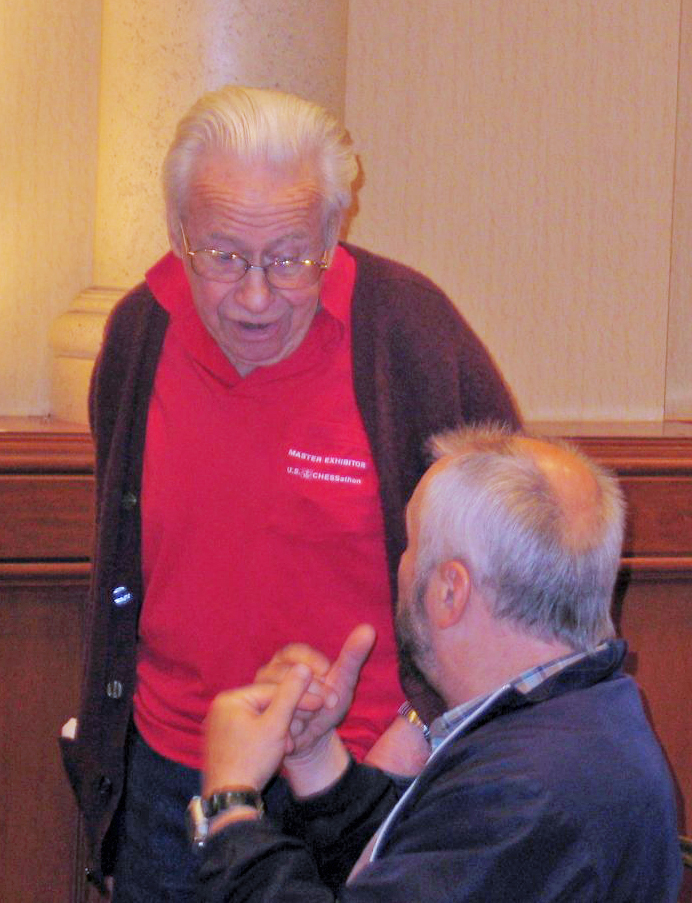
- Bisguier at the National Open, Las Vegas, Nevada, in 2009

Personal information
- Born: Arthur Bernard Bisguier; October 8, 1929 New York City, New York, U.S.
- Died: April 5, 2017 (aged 87) Framingham, Massachusetts, U.S.

Chess career
- Country: United States
- Title: Grandmaster (1957)
- Peak rating: 2455 (January 1980)

Arthur Bernard Bisguier (October 8, 1929 – April 5, 2017) was an American chess player, chess promoter, and writer who held the FIDE title of Grandmaster (GM).

Bisguier won two U.S. Junior Championships (1948, 1949), three U.S. Open Chess Championship titles (1950, 1956, 1959), and the 1954 United States Chess Championship title. He played for the United States in five chess Olympiads. He also played in two Interzonal tournaments (1955, 1962).

Bisguier died of respiratory failure on April 5, 2017, at age 87. On March 18, 2005, the United States Chess Federation (USCF) proclaimed him "Dean of American Chess".

== Early years ==
Bisguier was Jewish and was born in New York City and graduated from the Bronx High School of Science. He was taught chess at the age of 4 by his father Jesse (born Jechiel Max Bisgeier), a mathematician. In 1944, aged 15, he was third at the Bronx Empire Chess Club. In 1946, aged 17, he came fifth in the U.S. Open at Pittsburgh, followed by seventh place in 1948. Later that year, he took the U.S. Junior Championship and was invited to the New York City 1948–49 International Tournament. Throughout the 1940s, he was considered one of the United States' best players, with Larry Evans, George Kramer, and Walter Shipman. As he gained in strength, Bisguier was coached by Master Alexander Kevitz.

In 1949 he retained the U.S. Junior Championship title, and also won the Manhattan Chess Club Championship. In 1950 he won the first of his three U.S. Open titles, and also won at Southsea in England.

Army service interrupted his U.S. chess career during 1951 to 1953, but he managed to get leave to play in two European events. He played at the Helsinki Olympiad 1952, and then won the third annual Christmas tournament at Vienna 1952 with a 9–2 score. He earned the International Master title in 1950 from his Southsea victory.

== U.S. Champion, Grandmaster ==
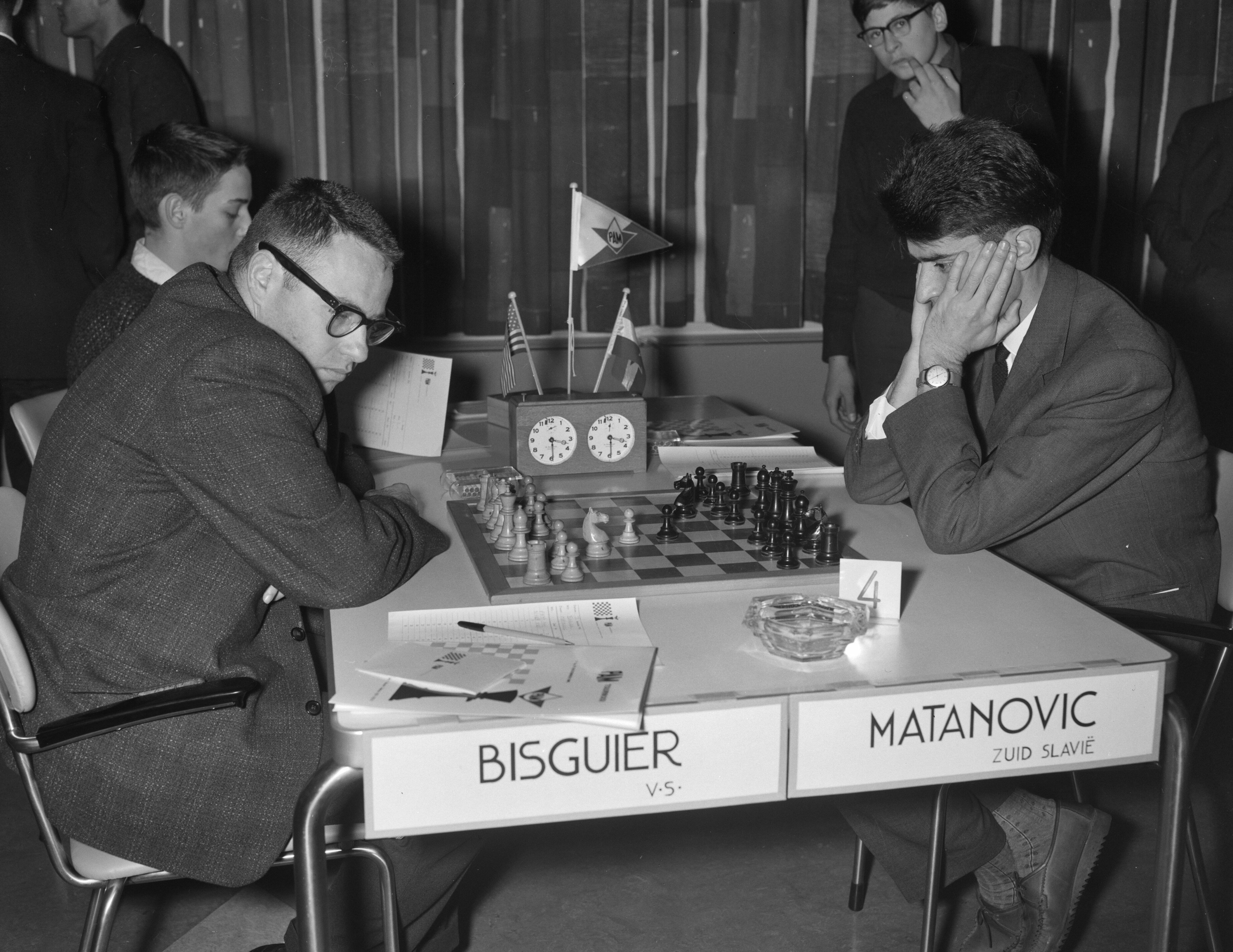
Bisguier vs. Matanovic (Utrecht, 1961)

After a poor performance in the U.S. Open in 1953, he entered the Philadelphia Candidates' Tournament for the U.S. Championship and came through with a first-place finish and another over-2600 performance. His meteoric rise culminated in winning the 1954 United States Chess Championship at New York. He also won the 2nd Pan American Chess Championship at Los Angeles 1954. In 1956 at Oklahoma City, he added the U.S. Open Chess Championship title to his U.S. Championship. Bisguier achieved the International Grandmaster title in 1957. He tied with Bobby Fischer for first–second places at the U.S. Open at Cleveland 1957, where Fischer was awarded the title on tiebreak.

== At the Olympiads ==
Bisguier represented the United States at five Chess Olympiads; his totals over 82 games are (+29−18=35), for 56.7 per cent. His detailed results, from olimpbase.org:

- Helsinki 1952, board 4, 7/15 (+3−4=8)
- Munich 1958, board 3, 8½/17 (+6−6=5)
- Leipzig 1960, board 4, 11½/16 (+9−2=5), team silver medal
- Tel Aviv 1964, board 4, 11½/18 (+8−3=7)
- Skopje 1972, board 4, 8/16 (+3−3=10)

== Further achievements ==
Following his U.S. title in 1954, Bisguier regularly returned to compete for the national championship, but was never able to repeat his success. The late 1950s saw the sensational rise of Bobby Fischer, who swept the eight U.S. Championship tournaments that he contested. Bisguier and Fischer were tied for first place going into the last round of the 1962–63 event, and they still had to face each other. Bisguier had a promising position but made a mistake, which Fischer punished spectacularly, allowing Fischer to take the game and the title. Fischer scored 8/11, with Bisguier a point back in clear second place. Bisguier also served as a second to Fischer at several international events.

Most of Bisguier's play after the mid-1960s was limited to U.S. events. He won National Opens in 1970 (jointly), 1974, and 1978. He won the Lone Pine tournament in 1973, tied for second place behind reigning world champion Boris Spassky in the international tournament in San Juan, Puerto Rico in 1969, and took first place in the first-ever Grand Prix in 1980. He took first place in the U.S. Senior Open in 1989, thus winning a U.S. championship at every age level of chess. He won the Senior Open again in 1997 and 1998.

Bisguier continued to play regularly at the Metrowest Chess Club in Natick, MA until 2014. He qualified for and competed in the 2011 Metrowest Club Championship.

Bisguier was the leading early proponent of the Berlin Defense to the Ruy Lopez, which was rarely used by grandmasters before him but later became popular at the highest levels. His successes with it included a draw with future world champion Anatoly Karpov at the 1970 tournament in Caracas, Venezuela.

== Chess promoter ==
For many years, Bisguier was hired to play in towns throughout the U.S. to give exhibitions, and to popularize chess and the USCF. For about 20 years, Bisguier was the representative the USCF chose to send to a state for one or two days to play at a hospital, college, or prison, so the public could get a chance to play the Grandmaster and former U.S. Champion. He commented: "I was delighted to do it. I was very lucky to get so much out of chess. I tried to give something back."

Victor Niederhoffer, the hedge fund manager, took chess lessons from Bisguier as an adult.

Bisguier was a regular contributor to Chess Life magazine. In 2003 he wrote a book on his best games from 1945 to 1960 titled The Art of Bisguier. A second volume, The Art of Bisguier: Selected Games 1961–2003, was released in 2008.

== Notable games ==
Bisguier vs. Fischer, 1956

Position: d8 black king, e8 white queen, b7 black pawn, d7 black queen, f7 black pawn, h7 black pawn, a6 black pawn, f6 black rook, g6 black pawn, d5 white knight, c4 white pawn, b3 white pawn, a2 white pawn, g2 white pawn, h2 white pawn, d1 white rook, g1 white king

Final position

The following game is Bisguier's sole win against Bobby Fischer, their first game played. Their second game was a draw, after which Fischer won 13 straight—perhaps the longest unbroken winning streak between grandmasters in history. Fischer was aged 13 at the time of this game, but already a strong player and won his celebrated Game of the Century against Donald Byrne in this same tournament.

Bisguier vs. Fischer, Rosenwald Memorial, New York 1956
1.d4 Nf6 2.c4 g6 3.Nc3 Bg7 4.e4 d6 5.f4 0-0 6.Nf3 c5 7.Be2 cxd4 8.Nxd4 Nc6 9.Nc2 Bd7 10.0-0 Rc8 11.Be3 Na5 12.b3 a6 13.e5 dxe5 14.fxe5 Ne8 15.Nd5 Rc6 16.Nd4 Rc8 17.Nc2 Rc6 18.Ncb4 Re6 19.Bg4 Rxe5 20.Bb6 Qc8 21.Bxd7 Qxd7 22.Bxa5 e6 23.Nd3 Rh5 24.N3f4 Rf5 25.Bb4 exd5 26.Bxf8 Bxa1 27.Qxa1 Kxf8 28.Qh8+ Ke7 29.Re1+ Kd8 30.Nxd5 Qc6 31.Qf8 Qd7 32.Rd1 Rf6 33.Qxe8+ 1–0

== See also ==
- List of Jewish chess players

Preceded by Larry Evans	United States Chess Champion; 1954–1958	Succeeded by Bobby Fischer
