= Patrick Zelbel =

German chess player (born 1993)

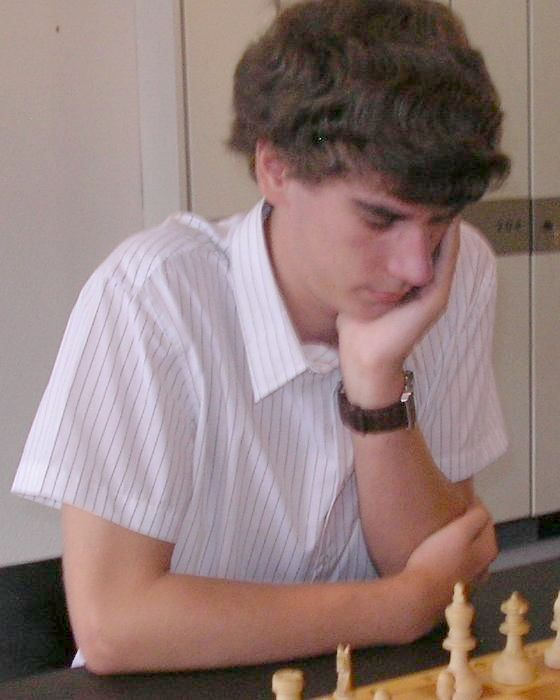
- Patrick Zelbel at the Dortmund Sparkassen Chess Meeting 2010

Personal information
- Born: May 8, 1993 (age 33) Dortmund, Germany

Chess career
- Country: Germany
- Title: International Master (2011)
- FIDE rating: 2465 (July 2026)
- Peak rating: 2493 (November 2024)

Patrick Zelbel (born 8 May 1993, in Dortmund) is a German chess player.

== Biography ==
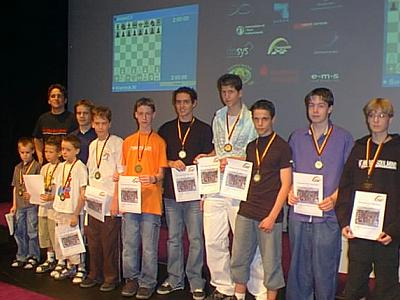
Patrick Zelbel at the Junior chess NRW 2004: From left to right: Matthias Blübaum, Leo Padva, Seva Bashylyn, Patrick Zelbel, Manuel Ebert, Thomas Stomberg, Alexander Hilverda, Wadim Rosenstein, Kevin Krug und Lukas Klein, at the back Martin Wojdyla (SJNRW) and Klaus Friedrichs.

Like Arkadij Naiditsch and David Baramidze, both now grandmasters, Zelbel visited the Dortmund chess school, founded in 1998, it promotes chess lessons at elementary schools. In 2000, he joined the Dortmund chess club Schachfreunde Brackel. Also aged nine, he played in Dortmund Sparkassen Chess Meeting 2002 in OPEN B. For Brackel, he first played in the youth teams and from the 2007/08 season in the first team in the regional league. At the award ceremony of the chess youth NRW, 2004 on the stage in the Dortmunder Schauspielhaus, he was honored together with his team. In the season 2011/12 to the season 2015/16, he played for Hansa Dortmund in the chess bundesliga 1 and 2. In the Season 2016/17, Zelbel played for SV Mülheim-Nord. In Belgium, he played in the season 2010/11 for KSK 47 Eynatten,

== Awards ==
In Willingen, he became the U10 German champion, at the U12 Championships in 2004 and 2005, also in Willingen, he finished third. At the Youth World Cup 2005 in Belfort, he scored in the age group U12 6.5 points from 11 games. In 2006, he won the German Internet Championship U14s. With the club Schachfreunden Brackel he won the 2008 German U16 team championship. In the same year he won in the Hernethe single championship of North Rhine-Westphalia. In 2009, he was the German U16 champion. With the German U18 national team, he finished third at the European Championships 2009 in Pardubice. In 2010, he won an IM tournament in Graz. In 2013, he was third in the German single championship in rapid chess in Gladenbach behind Martin Krämer and Igor Glek.

Since February 2011, he has been awarded the title International Master. He scored the standards needed in Saarbrücks 80th German Individual Championship in February 2009 and in Hoogeschool Zeeland Tournament in Vlissen in August of the same year.
