= Theophilus Thompson =

American chess player

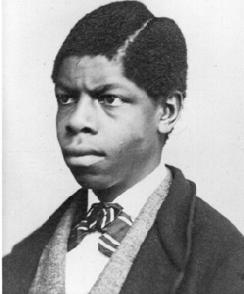
Profile of Thompson found in his Chess Problems book

Theophilus Augustus Thompson (April 21, 1855 - Oct 12, 1881) is the earliest documented African-American chess expert recognized in the United States. In addition to competing in tournaments, he wrote a book Chess Problems: Either to Play and Mate published in 1873.

== Early life ==
Thompson was born into slavery in Frederick, Maryland, as were his parents. After emancipation, in 1868, he worked as a house servant in Carroll County, Maryland, but returned to Frederick in 1870.

== Career ==
In April 1872, Thompson witnessed the game for the first time, in a match between John K. Hanshew and another man. Hanshew, who was the publisher of The Maryland Chess Review, gave Thompson a chessboard and some chess problems to solve. Thompson showed an immediate ability to learn the game and master its rules. Thompson's fame grew and he competed in a number of tournaments.

He gained lasting fame for his book of endgame positions: Chess Problems: Either to Play and Mate (1873). It was published by Orestes Brownson Jr., the editor of the Dubuque Chess Journal, for whom Thompson also worked as a servant.

Thompson faded into obscurity soon after gaining prominence with his book, and there is some uncertainty about the remainder of his life. The Dubuque Chess Journal closed in 1875 and Brownson Jr. died soon after, leaving Thompson without a job. In 1879, his mentor John K. Hanshew died of TB. Thompson infected himself with tuberculosis and suffered some years. When Hanshew had died, his health was so bad that he couldn't play competitive chess any longer. At Oct 12, 1881 Theophilus Thompson died of tuberculosis in his home town Frederick. The death notice was published in the local newspaper, the "Frederick Examiner". (Reference: The Chess Drum, notice from April 2020)

The U.S. Chess Center in Washington D.C. hosts the Theophilus Thompson Chess Club in his honor on Saturday afternoons.
