= Rudolph Sze =

Chinese chess master

Rudolph L. Sze (c. 1890 in Shanghai, China – June 14, 1938 in Philadelphia, USA) was a Chinese chess master.

He was sent by the Chinese government to study in America in the late 1890s, most probably with another group of Chinese students. It is very possible that he was related to two brothers who shared the same surname: Henry Sze and Alfred Sze. They came from a "high caste" and their father was the head of a large family and the superintendent of the China Merchants Steam Navigation Company.

According to the American Chess Bulletin of February 1911, Sze "acquired his experience in chess in Washington." He beat Emanuel Lasker 2–0 in simultaneous exhibition games at Washington 1910 and New York 1911.

The University of Pennsylvania Chess Club (Norman Whitaker and G.F. Weiner, with L.R. Sze as an alternate), finished 2nd in the Triangular League Tournament in late December 1910, behind Cornell University Chess Club but ahead of College of the City of New York. In April 1911, the University of Pennsylvania team (Whitaker, Sze and M. J. Teltelbaum) toured New England, where they played matches against Harvard University, Yale University, and Brown University Chess Clubs.

In the annual championship of the Franklin Chess Club of Pennsylvania for 1911, Sze finished on the 7th position with 8 wins and 6 losses, behind C.S. Martinez, Stasch Mlotkowski, etc. He was crowned as the new President of the University of Pennsylvania Chess Club by late 1911. The Washington Post of December 24, 1911 noted that "Sze, the Chinese Player, Will Take Place of Whitaker." In February and April 1912, Sze guided his team to spectacular victories against Yale University. He also tied for 3rd-4th in the Pennsylvania State Chess Championship, and played in the Franklin Chess Championship. By the end of December 1912, Penn would emerge as the victor of the 14th Triangular College Chess League Championship, confirming their good performances in recent years. The same happened in 1913, when Sze led his team to victory in the 15th edition of the same tournament.

After he achieved fame in Pennsylvania and the neighboring states during 1910 and 1914, he sailed to Shanghai in the early stages of the World War I. Sze would return to the United States via San Francisco in September 1916. He came back to Philadelphia, but there is no mention of him returning to chess.
