= Olena Boytsun =

Ukrainian chess player

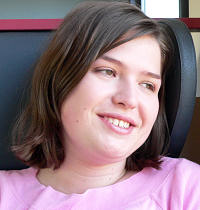
- Boytsun in 2005

Personal information
- Born: Олена Бойцун; 22 March 1983 (age 43)

Chess career
- Country: Ukraine
- Title: Woman International Master (2002)
- Peak rating: 2319 (January 2002)

Olena Boytsun (born 22 March 1983) is a Ukrainian chess player. She has an MA in International Economics, having graduated from the Dnipropetrovsk National University. She is currently doing research for her PhD on "The effects of financial globalization on developing countries".

Boytsun has been playing chess since her childhood. Her current title is Woman International Master. For the last four years she has been cooperating with Internet and regular newspapers, writing mainly (but not only) about economics. Boytsun is a regular contributor to the ChessBase news page.
