= Solomon Rubinstein =

Polish-American chess player

Solomon Rubinstein (1868 in Poland – 27 November 1931 in Los Angeles, United States) was a Polish–American chess master.

Born in Poland, he left his native country for the United States. He tied for 10-11th in the American National Chess Masters Tournament at New York 1913 (José Raúl Capablanca won).
