= Alexander Kevitz =

American chess player (1902–1981)

Alexander Kevitz (September 1, 1902 – October 24, 1981) was an American chess master. Kevitz also played correspondence chess, and was a creative chess analyst and theoretician. He was a pharmacist by profession.

== Early life ==
Kevitz was born in Brooklyn, New York. He graduated from Cornell University in 1923. He later earned degrees in law and pharmacy from Brooklyn College of Pharmacy. His professional career was that of a pharmacist.

== Major chess results ==
Kevitz defeated world champion José Raúl Capablanca in a simultaneous display at New York City 1924, and defeated former world champion Emanuel Lasker in a 1928 simultaneous, also in New York. He won the Manhattan Chess Club Championship six times: in 1929, 1936, 1946, 1955, 1974, and 1977 (according to other sources: in 1929, 1933, 1935, 1936, 1946, 1947, and 1955, and also in 1927, 1932, 1934, 1955, 1975, and 1977). From the 1920s through the 1950s, the top section of Manhattan C.C. Championship was usually at the level of a strong International tournament. Kevitz also represented the Manhattan Club in the "Metropolitan Chess League".

Kevitz made his international debut at Bradley Beach 1929, with 4/9 for 8th place; world champion Alexander Alekhine won. Kevitz scored 7/11 at New York City 1931 for 3rd place, as José Raúl Capablanca won. In the 16th Marshall Chess Club Championship 1932, Kevitz scored 9/13 for 2nd place, behind Reuben Fine. In the 17th Marshall Chess Club Championship 1933-34, Kevitz scored 8/11, tied 2nd-3rd, again behind Fine. In the United States Chess Championship, New York 1936, Kevitz scored 7.5/15 for 8th place, as Samuel Reshevsky won. In the team match, USA vs USSR at Moscow 1946, Kevitz made the best American result with 1.5/2 against Igor Bondarevsky. He drew both of his games against Borislav Milić in a 1950 radio match with Yugoslavia. He placed 13th at the U.S. Open at Milwaukee 1953. Kevitz lost to Paul Keres in a USA vs USSR team match at New York 1954, and he lost both his games against Alexander Kotov in a USA vs USSR team match at Moscow 1955. In the Manhattan Chess Club Championship, 1955–56, Kevitz scored 8.5/15 for 6-7th place, and defeated his student, Arthur Bisguier, a future Grandmaster, who was then U.S. champion.

On the first official United States Chess Federation rating list, July 31, 1950, Kevitz ranked third at 2610, behind only Reuben Fine and Samuel Reshevsky.

In his later years, Kevitz was active in correspondence chess, often playing under the pseudonym 'Palmer Phar' (he worked at Palmer Pharmacy).

== Theoretical contributions ==
Kevitz made important contributions to several chess openings. In the Réti Opening, he developed the line 1.Nf3 d5 2.c4 dxc4 3.e4. The variation of the Symmetrical English Opening (A31) arising after 1.c4 c5 2.Nf3 Nf6 3.d4 cxd4 4.Nxd4 e5 5.Nb5 d5 is often referred to as the Kevitz Gambit. In the English Opening, Flohr-Mikenas variation (A18), the line 1.c4 Nf6 2.Nc3 e6 3.e4 Nc6 is known as the Kevitz Variation. The variation 1.d4 Nf6 2.c4 Nc6 is sometimes called the Kevitz-Trajkovic Defence, alternatively the Black Knights' Tango or Mexican Defence. In the Nimzowitsch Defence, 1.e4 Nc6, the Kevitz Variation continues 2.d4 e5. In the 1940s, Kevitz analyzed a new idea in the Ruy Lopez, Marshall Attack, after 1.e4 e5 2.Nf3 Nc6 3.Bb5 a6 4.Ba4 Nf6 5.0-0 Be7 6.Re1 b5 7.Bb3 0-0 8.c3 d5 9.exd5 Nxd5 10.Nxe5 Nxe5 11.Rxe5 c6 12.Bxd5 cxd5 13.d4 Bd6 14.Re3, which prepares 15.h3 in the event of 14...Qh4. 1.e4 e5 2.Nf3 Nc6 3.Bb5 g6 4.c3 f5 – the so-called Kevitz Gambit!

Kevitz was respected by his chess rivals as an original player, thinker, and analyst. He was active in tournament play until age 78 in 1980, the year before his death.
