= Leopold Hoffer =

Jewish-British chess player and journalist

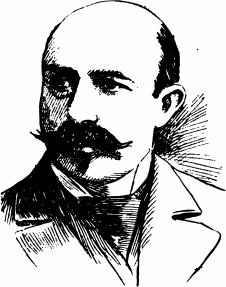
Leopold Hoffer

Leopold Hoffer (1842 in Hungary – 28 August 1913 in England) was an English chess player and journalist.

He left Budapest for Switzerland. From 1867, he lived in Paris, where he won matches against, among others, Ignatz von Kolisch, Samuel Rosenthal and Jules Arnous de Rivière. In 1870, Hoffer emigrated to England, where he spent the remainder of his life.

From 1879-1896, Hoffer was a founder and editor (with Johannes Zukertort) of the magazine Chess Monthly.

== Publications ==
- Hoffer, L; Zukertort, Johannes, eds. (1879–1896), "Chess Monthly", reprint catalogue, vol. 1–17, Moravian chess, archived from the original on 4 July 2007
- L. Hoffer, ed. (1908), The Championship Match: Lasker v. Tarrasch, London: E.A. Michell & Frank Hollings
- L. Hoffer (1916), Chess (10th ed.), Petersburg: Will H. Lyons; Kentucky, U.S.A: Boone Co
