= Simon Rubinstein (chess player) =

Austrian chess player

Simon Rubinstein (c. 1910–1942) was an Austrian chess master. He participated several times in the Leopold Trebitsch Memorial Tournament in Vienna; took 12th in 1932 (Albert Becker won), tied for 11–12th in 1933 (Ernst Grünfeld and Hans Müller won), tied for 6–7th in 1936 (Henryk Friedman won), and took 2nd, behind Lajos Steiner, in 1937/38. He died in a concentration camp in 1942.
