= Laura Ross (chess player) =

American chess player

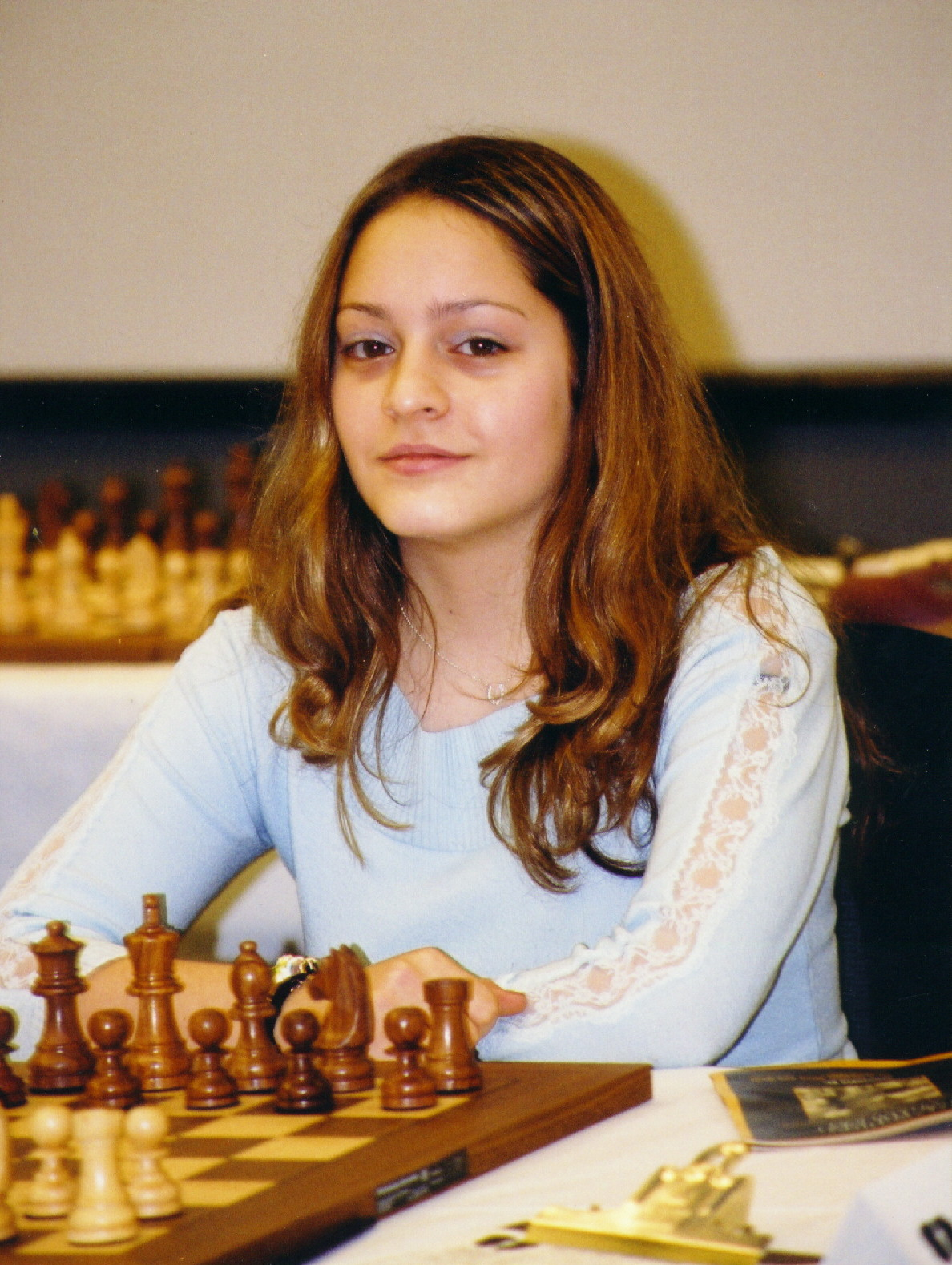
- Ross at the 2003 U.S. Chess Championships

Personal information
- Full name: Laura R. Ross
- Born: 1988 (age 37–38)

Chess career
- Country: United States
- Title: Woman FIDE Master
- FIDE rating: 2129 (May 2013)
- Peak rating: 2179 (July 2006)

Laura R. Smith (born 1988), formerly Laura R. Ross, is an American chess player.

== Chess career ==
She holds the title of Woman FIDE Master. As of September 2011, her FIDE rating was 2142. She is no longer an active player, but she does enjoy playing for fun. Laura also teaches private chess lessons.

In 1998 she finished eighth in the World Championship Girls Under 10.

Ross was the first US female to head a "Top 100 Players" list of both male and female players, as published by the United States Chess Federation. In April 2002 she became the highest rated 13-year-old, male or female, in the US.

Laura is an alumna of Binghamton University.

After college Laura taught for the non-profit Chess-in-the-Schools. She enjoyed teaching so much that she went on to earn her Master's in Childhood Education. She is now a 3rd Grade teacher in Brooklyn and she helps run the chess team at the school.

== Professional affiliations ==
- FIDE World Chess Federation
- United States Chess Federation
- Chess-in-the-Schools

== Professional achievements ==
- Women's FIDE Master
- FIDE rated 2142 (September 2011).
- Rated 11th top US Female player

== Awards ==
- Women's US Championship (San Diego CA): won USCF Chess-Scholar Award; placed 2nd in competition
- Pan-American Championship (Cordoba, Argentina): earned silver medal in Girls Under 14 category
- Earned a spot on the US Youth Chess Team for 8 consecutive years. Placed in the Top Ten 3 times, WFM Laura Ross (accessed September 7, 2011)
