= Ivan Radulov =

Bulgarian chess grandmaster

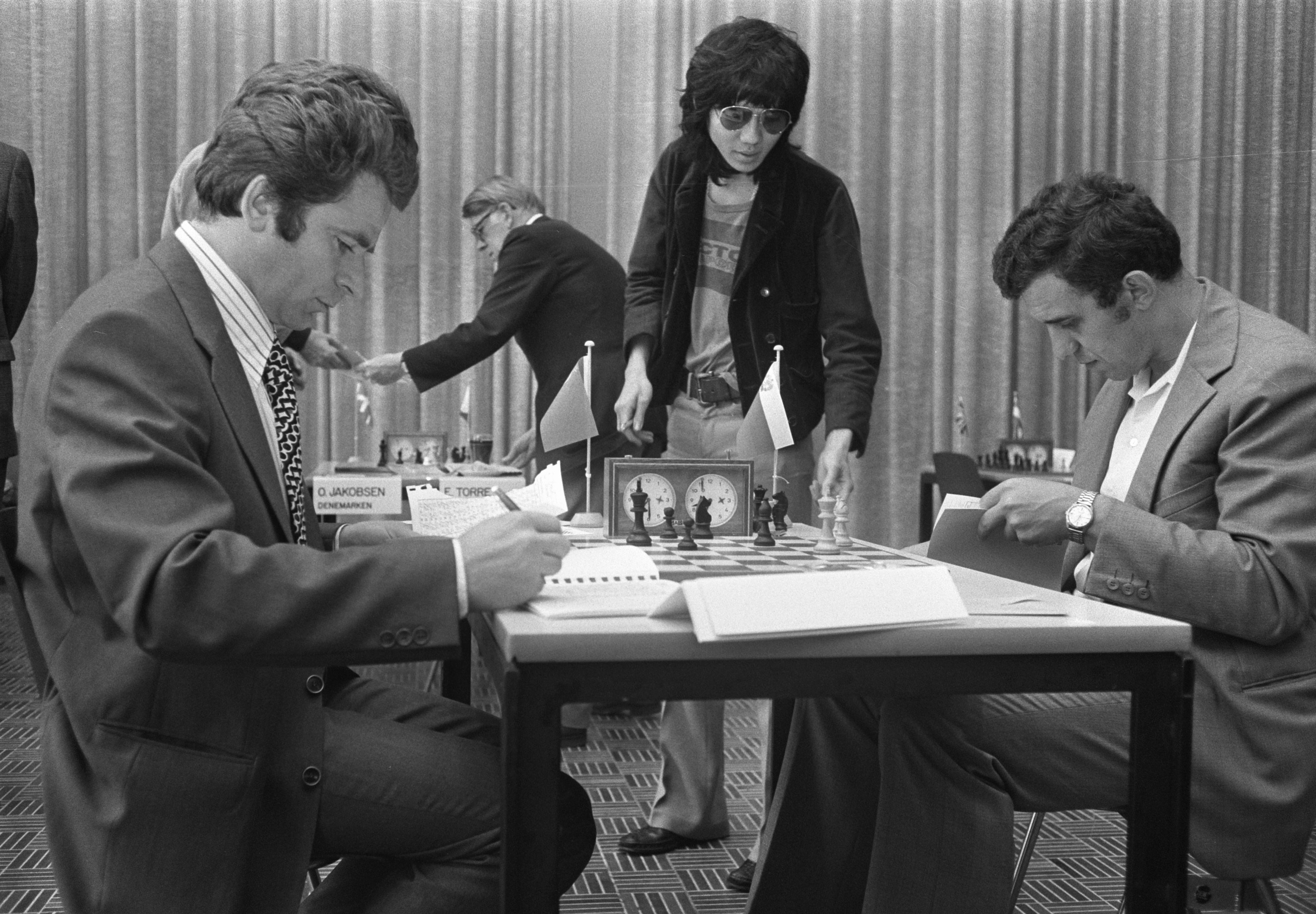
- Spassky vs. Radulov (1973)

Personal information
- Born: Ivan Georgiev Radulov; January 7, 1939 (age 87) Burgas, Bulgaria

Chess career
- Country: Bulgaria
- Title: Grandmaster (1972)
- FIDE rating: 2245 (October 2013)
- Peak rating: 2530 (July 1973)
- Peak ranking: No. 47 (July 1973)

Ivan Georgiev Radulov (Bulgarian: Иван Георгиев Радулов; born 7 January 1939) is a Bulgarian chess grandmaster.

As a chess player, he was most prominent during the 1970s, winning the Bulgarian Championship in 1971, 1974, 1977 and 1980. He just missed out at the 1976 event, finishing 2nd (with Peicho Peev, after Evgeny Ermenkov). It was during this decade that Radulov took over from Georgi Tringov as Bulgaria's leading player, eventually giving way to Kiril Georgiev in the 1980s.

His international tournament victories included Torremolinos in 1971 (shared with Miguel Quinteros), Helsinki in 1972, Montilla in 1974, Bajmok in 1975 (shared with Milan Matulović and Milan Vukić), Montilla in 1975 (shared with Lev Polugaevsky) and Kikinda in 1976. At the 1974 Montilla tournament, he finished ahead of players including Lubomir Kavalek, Helmut Pfleger, Miguel Quinteros, Florin Gheorghiu, and Ulf Andersson. He also finished second at Varna and Debrecen in 1968 and at Silkeborg in 1983, and placed third at Albena in 1975. In 2013, he won the European Senior Rapid Championship in Plovdiv.

He was a regular member of the Bulgarian Olympiad team, competing eight times between 1968 and 1986 and winning bronze team and individual medals at his first appearance.

International Master and International Grandmaster titles were awarded to Radulov in 1968 and 1972, respectively. For many years, he was a practicing civil engineer and among other projects, contributed to the design of the central train station of Sofia.

Ivan Radulov has been married for more than 40 years to Eleonora and together they have two children and four grandchildren: Viktoria, Ivan, another Ivan, and Julian.
