= Atanas Kolarov =

Bulgarian chess player (1934–2016)

Personal information
- Born: 2 March 1934 Ruse, Bulgaria
- Died: 22 September 2016 (aged 82)

Chess career
- Country: Bulgaria
- Title: International Master (1957)
- FIDE rating: 2415 (July 2026)
- Peak rating: 2445 (July 1973)

Atanas Kolarov (Bulgarian: Атанас Коларов; 2 March 1934 – 22 September 2016) was a Bulgarian chess International Master (1957) and Chess Olympiad team bronze medal winner (1968).

== Biography ==
In 1964, Atanas Kolarov shared the first place Bulgarian Chess Championship with Nikola Padevsky, but lost in an additional match for champion title with 1½:2½. In the Bulgarian Chess Championships he another four times won silver medal (1955, 1957, 1958, 1970) and once won bronze medal (1953). Atanas Kolarov was winner of many international chess tournament awards. In 1957, he was awarded the FIDE International Master (IM) title.

Atanas Kolarov played for Bulgaria in the Chess Olympiads:

- In 1956, at third board in the 12th Chess Olympiad in Moscow (+1, =5, -4),
- In 1960, at fourth board in the 14th Chess Olympiad in Leipzig (+5, =7, -0),
- In 1962, at fourth board in the 15th Chess Olympiad in Varna (+2, =5, -1),
- In 1966, at reserve board in the 17th Chess Olympiad in Havana (+4, =5, -1),
- In 1968, at fourth board in the 18th Chess Olympiad in Lugano (+4, =4, -3) and won team bronze medal,
- In 1970, at second reserve board in the 19th Chess Olympiad in Siegen (+6, =1, -1).

Atanas Kolarov played for Bulgaria in the European Team Chess Championship:

- In 1970, at sixth board in the 4th European Team Chess Championship in Kapfenberg (+1, =3, -3).

Atanas Kolarov played for Bulgaria in the World Student Team Chess Championships:

- In 1954, at first reserve board in the 1st World Student Team Chess Championship in Oslo (+5, =0, -0) and won team bronze medal and individual gold medal,
- In 1955, at first reserve board in the 2nd World Student Team Chess Championship in Lyon (+2, =4, -0),
- In 1956, at second board in the 3rd World Student Team Chess Championship in Uppsala (+2, =3, -3),
- In 1957, at first board in the 4th World Student Team Chess Championship in Reykjavík (+7, =4, -1) and won team silver medal,
- In 1958, at second board in the 5th World Student Team Chess Championship in Varna (+1, =6, -1) and won team silver medal,
- In 1960, at first board in the 7th World Student Team Chess Championship in Leningrad (+4, =6, -3).

Atanas Kolarov graduated from Technical University (Sofia) and was a programmer by profession.

Kolarov died on 22 September 2016, at the age of 82.
