= Vera Jürgens =

German chess player (born 1969)

Personal information
- Born: 5 September 1969 (age 56) Stara Zagora, Bulgaria

Chess career
- Country: Bulgaria; Germany
- Title: Woman Grandmaster (1993)
- Peak rating: 2340 (January 1994)

Vera Jürgens (née Peicheva, born 5 September 1969), also known as Vera Peicheva-Jürgens, is a Bulgarian and German female chess player. She earned the FIDE title of Woman Grandmaster (WGM) in 1993 and won the Bulgarian Women's Chess Championship in 1990.

== Biography ==
At the end of the 1980s she was one of the leading female chess players in Bulgaria. In 1987, in Sofia she won silver medal in the Bulgarian Women's Chess Championship. In 1989, she won bronze medal in the European Girl's Junior Championship in U20 age group and won second place in Athens International Women's Chess Tournament behind winner Svetlana Prudnikova. In 1990, she won Bulgarian Women's Chess Championship.

She played for Bulgaria in the Women's Chess Olympiad:

- In 1990, at second board in the 29th Chess Olympiad (women) in Novi Sad (+4, =3, -4).

In 1991, she married and moved to Germany. Since 1992, she has been representing this country in chess tournaments. In 1993, in Dresden she ranked second in International Women's Chess tournament behind winner Margarita Voiska. In 1993, in Graz she won Women's World Chess Championship Zonal Tournament. In 1993, Vera Jürgens participated in Women's World Chess Championship Interzonal Tournament in Jakarta where ranked 32nd place. In 2002, she won silver medal in German Women's Chess Championship behind winner Gisela Fischdick. In 2007, she won the German Women's Fast Chess Championship.

Vera Jürgens played for Germany in the Women's Chess Olympiad:

- In 2006, at first reserve board in the 37th Chess Olympiad (women) in Turin (+3, =6, -1).

In 1988, she was awarded the FIDE Woman International Master (WIM) title and received the FIDE Woman Grandmaster (WGM) title five years later.
