= Gochev =

Gochev (masculine, Bulgarian: Гочев) or Gocheva (feminine, Bulgarian: Гочева) is a Bulgarian surname. Notable people with the surname include:

- Miroslav Gochev (born 1973), Bulgarian sport wrestler
- Rumiana Gocheva (born 1957), Bulgarian chess player
- Rusi Gochev (born 1958), Bulgarian footballer

== See also ==
- Karolina Gočeva (born 1980), Macedonian singer
