= Georgi Tringov =

Bulgarian chess grandmaster (1937–2000)

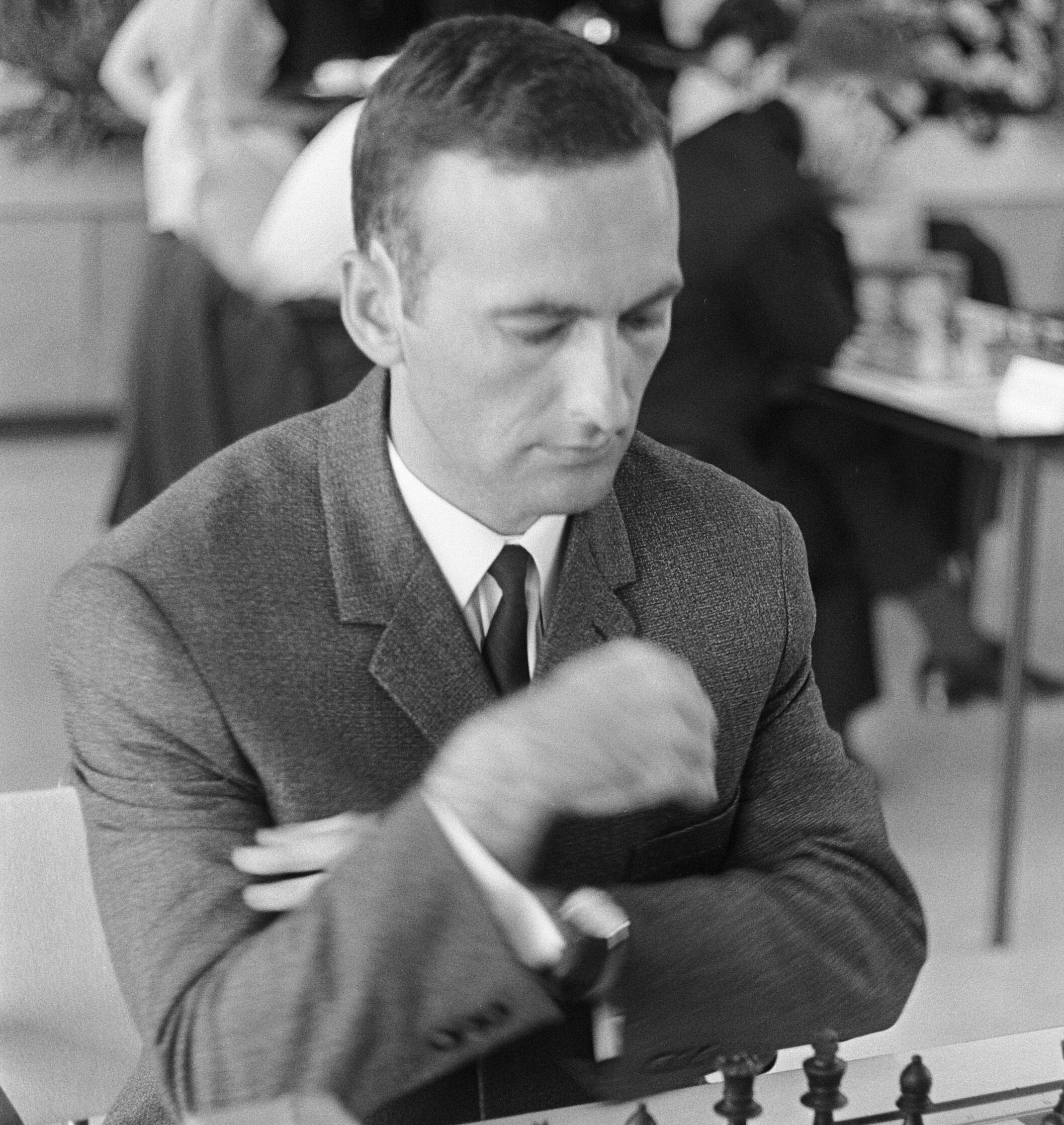
- Georgi Tringov (1966)

Personal information
- Born: 7 March 1937 Plovdiv, Bulgaria
- Died: 2 July 2000 (aged 63) Plovdiv, Bulgaria

Chess career
- Country: Bulgaria
- Title: Grandmaster (1963)
- Peak rating: 2495 (January 1977)
- Peak ranking: No. 83 (July 1971)

Georgi Petrov Tringov (Bulgarian: Георги Петров Трингов) (7 March 1937 – 2 July 2000) was a Grandmaster of chess from Bulgaria. He won the Bulgarian national chess championship in 1963, the year he was awarded the Grandmaster title, only the second Bulgarian player thus honored (after Milko Bobotsov). He was active mainly during the 1960s and 1970s and qualified for the 1964 Interzonal stage of the process for selecting a challenger for the World Chess Championship, but finished fifteenth in the Interzonal held in Amsterdam, so did not advance to the Candidates matches held in 1965. Tringov had numerous successes in international tournaments to his credit, including first place at Vrsac 1973.

Tringov placed fifth in the 1955 World Junior Championship. He played for Bulgaria in five World Student Team Championships (1957 through 1960), winning the individual gold in three consecutive competitions: on board four in 1957 and 1958 and on board two in 1959 with a 92.3% score (+11=2−0). The Bulgarian student team was also successful those years, taking the team silver medal in 1957 and 1958 and the gold in 1959. Tringov was a regular member of the Bulgarian team in the Chess Olympiads, playing in 12 Olympiads (every contest from 1956 to 1982 except 1960 and 1976). In 1968 and in 1978 he had his best Olympiad results, twice winning the individual gold medal with a score of 78.6% (+8=6-0) on board two and ten years later with 77.3% (+6=5−0) on board three respectively.

A controversy involving Tringov took place at the 20th Chess Olympiad in 1972. In the fourth round of Final Group A, the Bulgarian and Soviet Union teams met. A game between Tringov and Viktor Korchnoi was adjourned after 41 moves with Tringov to seal his next move. At this Olympiad, sealed moves were written on a separate piece of paper, not the player's score sheet. Tringov rejected this way of sealing his move and instead wrote it on his score sheet.

When the game was resumed, the arbiter opened the envelope. In the envelope was Korchnoi's score sheet but not the one belonging to Tringov. The arbiter ruled the game a forfeit win for Korchnoi. Oleg Neikirch, who was serving as Bulgarian team captain, instituted protest proceedings but an arbitration committee upheld the arbiter's ruling.

After the Olympiad was over, it was learned that Tringov had accidentally placed his score sheet in his pocket. Tringov discovered his mistake several days after his forfeit but was too ashamed to admit his mistake to the organizers of the Olympiad.

Tringov earned the International Master (IM) title in 1962 and became a GM in 1963.
