= Peev =

Peev or Peyev (Bulgarian: Пеев) is a Bulgarian masculine surname, its feminine counterpart is Peeva or Peyeva. It may refer to:

- Daniel Peev (born 1984), Bulgarian football player
- Georgi Peev (born 1979), Bulgarian footballer
- Gerri Peev, Bulgarian-British journalist
- Irena Peeva, professor of mathematics at Cornell University
- Peicho Peev (1940–2007), Bulgarian chess master
- Vela Peeva (1922–1944), Bulgarian activist during World War II
- Vinkenti Peev (1873–1941), Bulgarian Catholic priest
