= Ventzislav Inkiov =

Bulgarian chess grandmaster (born 1956)

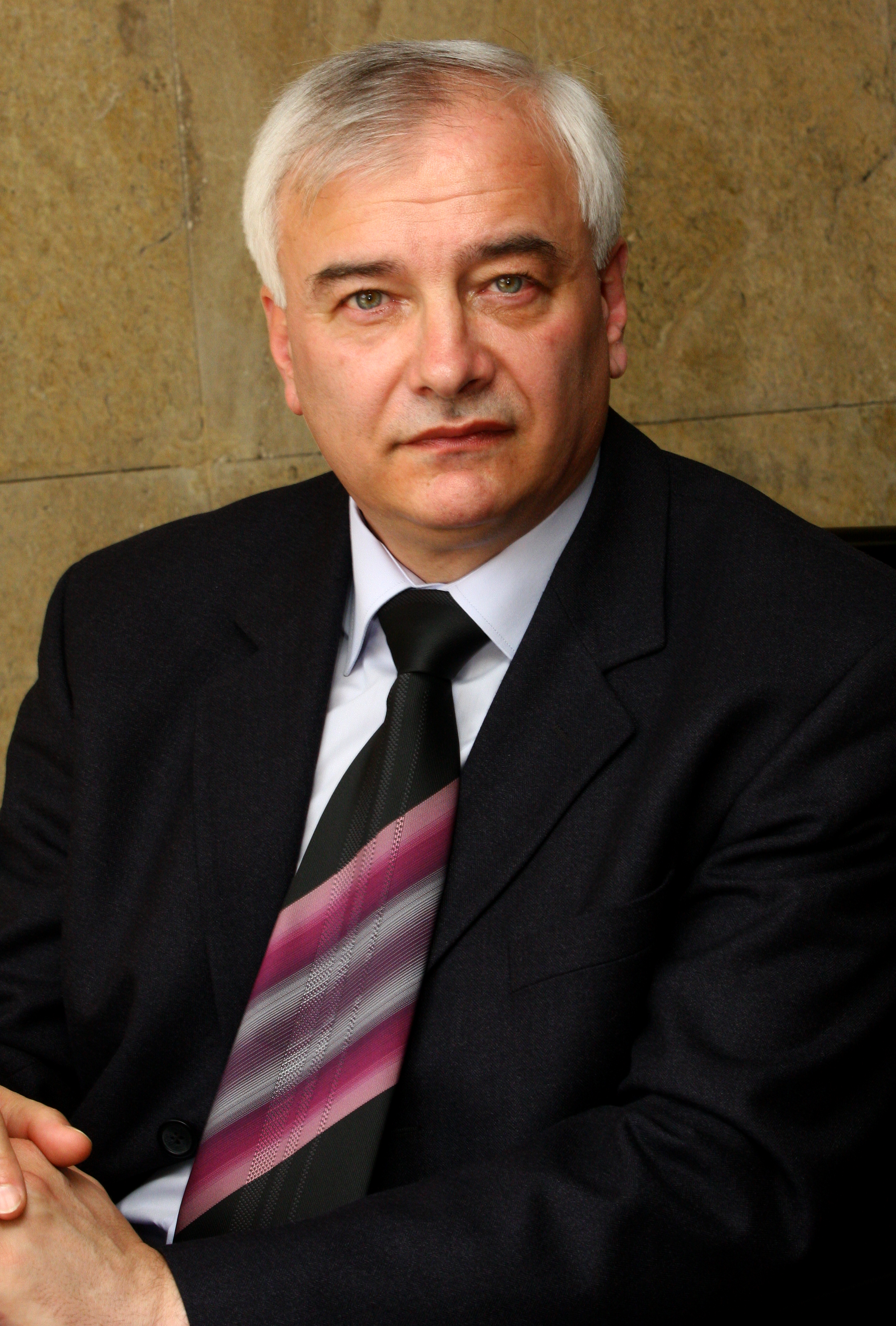
- Ventzislav Inkiov in 2010

Personal information
- Born: 19 May 1956 (age 70) Dupnitsa, Bulgaria

Chess career
- Country: Bulgaria
- Title: Grandmaster (1982)
- FIDE rating: 2409 (July 2026)
- Peak rating: 2538 (July 2006)

Ventzislav Inkiov (Bulgarian: Венцислав Инкьов; born 19 May 1956) is a Bulgarian chess Grandmaster (GM) (1982), Bulgarian Chess Championship winner (1982).

== Biography ==
From the 1980s to the 2000s, Ventzislav Inkiov was one of the leading Bulgaria chess players. He won Bulgarian Chess Championship in 1982. Also Ventzislav Inkiov four times won Bulgarian Chess Championship silver (1977, 1980, 1984, 1989) and bronze (1981) medals.

In 1987 in Zagreb he participated in the World Chess Championship Interzonal Tournament where ranked in 13th place.

Ventzislav Inkiov won or shared the 1st place in many international chess tournaments, include Łódź (1978), Niš (1983), Varna (1985), Clichy (1999), Bois-Colombes (1999), Robecchetto con Induno (2000), Rijeka (2001), Plancoët (2001), Condom (2002), Le Touquet (2002), Bad Neustadt (2003), Guingamp (2004), Schwäbisch Gmünd (2006).

Ventzislav Inkiov played for Bulgaria in the Chess Olympiads:

- In 1978, at second reserve board in the 23rd Chess Olympiad in Buenos Aires (+1, =3, -1),
- In 1982, at fourth board in the 25th Chess Olympiad in Lucerne (+6, =3, -2),
- In 1984, at third board in the 26th Chess Olympiad in Thessaloniki (+5, =5, -2),
- In 1986, at second board in the 27th Chess Olympiad in Dubai (+3, =5, -2),
- In 1988, at third board in the 28th Chess Olympiad in Thessaloniki (+3, =1, -4),
- In 1990, at second board in the 29th Chess Olympiad in Novi Sad (+1, =4, -3).

Ventzislav Inkiov played for Bulgaria in the European Team Chess Championships:

- In 1980, at seventh board in the 7th European Team Chess Championship in Skara (+0, =4, -2),
- In 1983, at third board in the 8th European Team Chess Championship in Plovdiv (+0, =4, -2),
- In 1989, at third board in the 9th European Team Chess Championship in Haifa (+1, =4, -2).

Ventzislav Inkiov played for Bulgaria in the Men's Chess Balkaniads:

- In 1973, at seventh board in the 5th Men's Chess Balkaniad in Poiana Brașov (+1, =2, -1) and won team gold and individual silver medal,
- In 1978, at third board in the 10th Men's Chess Balkaniad in Băile Herculane (+1, =1, -0) and won team bronze and individual gold medals,
- In 1979, at sixth board in the 11th Chess Balkaniad in Bihać (+3, =2, -0) and won team silver and individual gold medals,
- In 1980, at first reserve board in the 12th Chess Balkaniad in Istanbul (+2, =1, -0) and won team bronze and individual silver medals,
- In 1981, at third board in the 13th Chess Balkaniad in Athens (+3, =0, -1) and won team bronze and individual silver medals,
- In 1982, at fourth board in the 14th Chess Balkaniad in Plovdiv (+3, =2, -0) and won team silver and individual bronze medals,
- In 1983, at third board in the 15th Chess Balkaniad in Băile Herculane (+0, =2, -0) and won team gold and individual gold medals,
- In 1985, at third board in the 17th Chess Balkaniad in Irakleio (+2, =1, -0) and won team bronze and individual gold medals,
- In 1986, at second board in the 18th Chess Balkaniad in Sofia (+0, =6, -0) and won team gold and individual bronze medals,
- In 1988, at third board in the 19th Chess Balkaniad in Kaštel Stari (+1, =4, -1) and won team gold and individual bronze medals.

In 1977, he was awarded the FIDE International Master (IM) title and received the FIDE Grandmaster (GM) title five years later.
