= Adriana Nikolova =

Bulgarian chess player (born 1988)

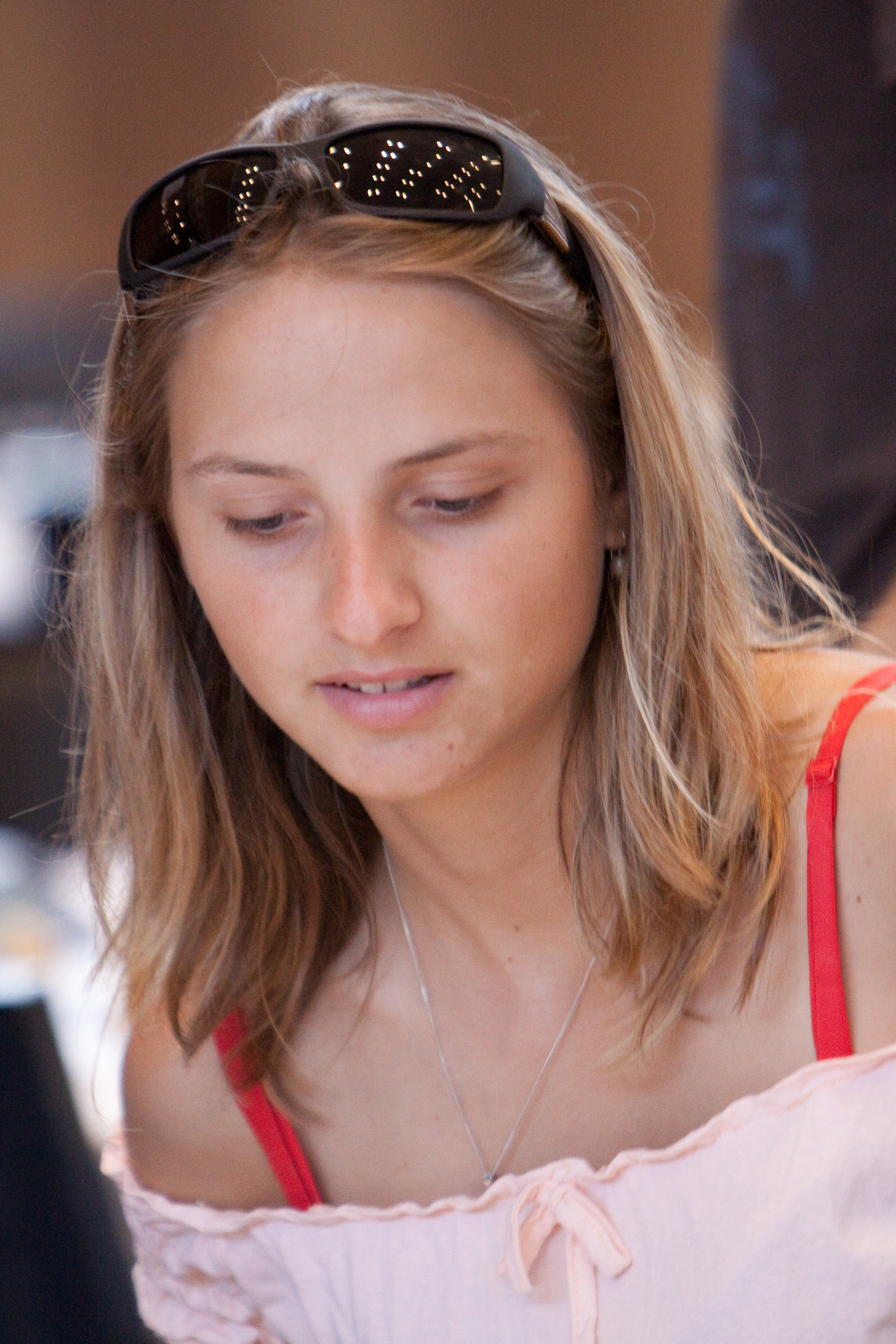
- Nikolova in 2009

Personal information
- Full name: Adriana Kostadinova Nikolova
- Born: November 9, 1988 (age 37) Stara Zagora, Bulgaria

Chess career
- Country: Bulgaria
- Title: Woman Grandmaster (2011)
- Peak rating: 2389 (November 2009)

Adriana Kostadinova Nikolova (Bulgarian Cyrillic: Адриана Костадинова Николова; born November 8, 1988) is a Bulgarian chess player who holds the FIDE title of Woman Grandmaster (WGM). She is Bulgaria's newest WGM and her chess club team is Lokomotiv 2000 from Plovdiv, with which she has won three national championships.

In November 2008, Nikolova earned the title of Woman International Master (WIM). She has so far represented her country in six major chess championships: the European Team Chess Championship, which was held in Novi Sad in 2009 (scoring 1.5/7 on Board 2), the 2010 Chess Olympiad in Khanty-Mansiysk (achieving 5/9 on Board 3), the 2011 European Team Chess Championship hosted at the Porto Carras resort in Greece (managing 4.5/7 on Board 4), the 2012 Chess Olympiad in Istanbul (finishing with 5/9 points on Board 3), the 2014 Chess Olympiad in Tromsø (securing 6/9 points on Board 3), as well as the 2016 Chess Olympiad in Baku (her final score being 6/10 on Board 3).

In July 2011, she received a gold medal and an official certificate to honour her achievement in becoming a woman grandmaster. Nikolova also won the 2011 edition of the Bulgarian Women Chess Championship (scoring 9/11).
