= Maria Velcheva =

Bulgarian chess player

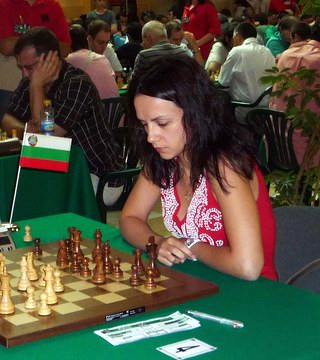
- Velcheva in 2008

Personal information
- Full name: Maria Nikolaeva Velcheva
- Born: 14 October 1976 (age 49) Mezdra, Bulgaria

Chess career
- Country: Bulgaria
- Title: Woman Grandmaster (1999)
- FIDE rating: 2197 (June 2018)
- Peak rating: 2364 (January 2000)

Maria Nikolaeva Velcheva (Bulgarian: Мария Николаева Велчева; born 14 October 1976) is a Bulgarian chess player who received the FIDE title of Woman Grandmaster (WGM) in 1999. She is a five-time winner of the Bulgarian Women's Chess Championship (1996, 1997, 1999, 2000, 2001).

== Biography ==
From 1990 to 1996 Maria Velcheva played for Bulgaria at the European Youth Chess Championship and at the World Youth Chess Championship in different age groups, where the best result was shown in 1995 in Holon, when she won the European Girl's Chess Championship in the age group U20. She won five times the Bulgarian Women's Chess Championship: 1996, 1997, 1999, 2000 and 2001. Multiple winner of various international chess tournaments, including winning in Pula (1998), in Bucharest (1999) and in women's classification in Biel Chess Festival (2000).

In 2008, in Nalchik Maria Velcheva participated in the Women's World Chess Championship 2008, where in the first round lost Anna Muzychuk.

Played for Bulgaria at eight Women's Chess Olympiads (1996-2010) and five Women's European Team Chess Championships (1999-2007).
