= Vasil Spasov (chess player) =

Bulgarian chess grandmaster (born 1971)

Personal information
- Born: February 17, 1971 (age 55) Varna, Bulgaria

Chess career
- Country: Bulgaria
- Title: Grandmaster (1991)
- Peak rating: 2621 (September 2010)
- Peak ranking: No. 50 (January 1998)

Vasil Spasov (sometimes spelled Spassov; Bulgarian: Васил Спасов; born 17 February 1971 in Varna) is a Bulgarian chess grandmaster. He won the World Junior Chess Championship in 1989, and the Bulgarian championship five times, in 1990, 1997, 2000, 2003 and 2008. Spasov also won the Balkan Individual Championship in 2001.

He played for the Bulgarian national team in eight Chess Olympiads (1990, 1992, 1994, 1996, 1998, 2002, 2004 and 2006) and in four European Team Chess Championships (1992, 2001, 2003 and 2005).
