= Nikola Spiridonov =

Bulgarian chess grandmaster (1938–2021)

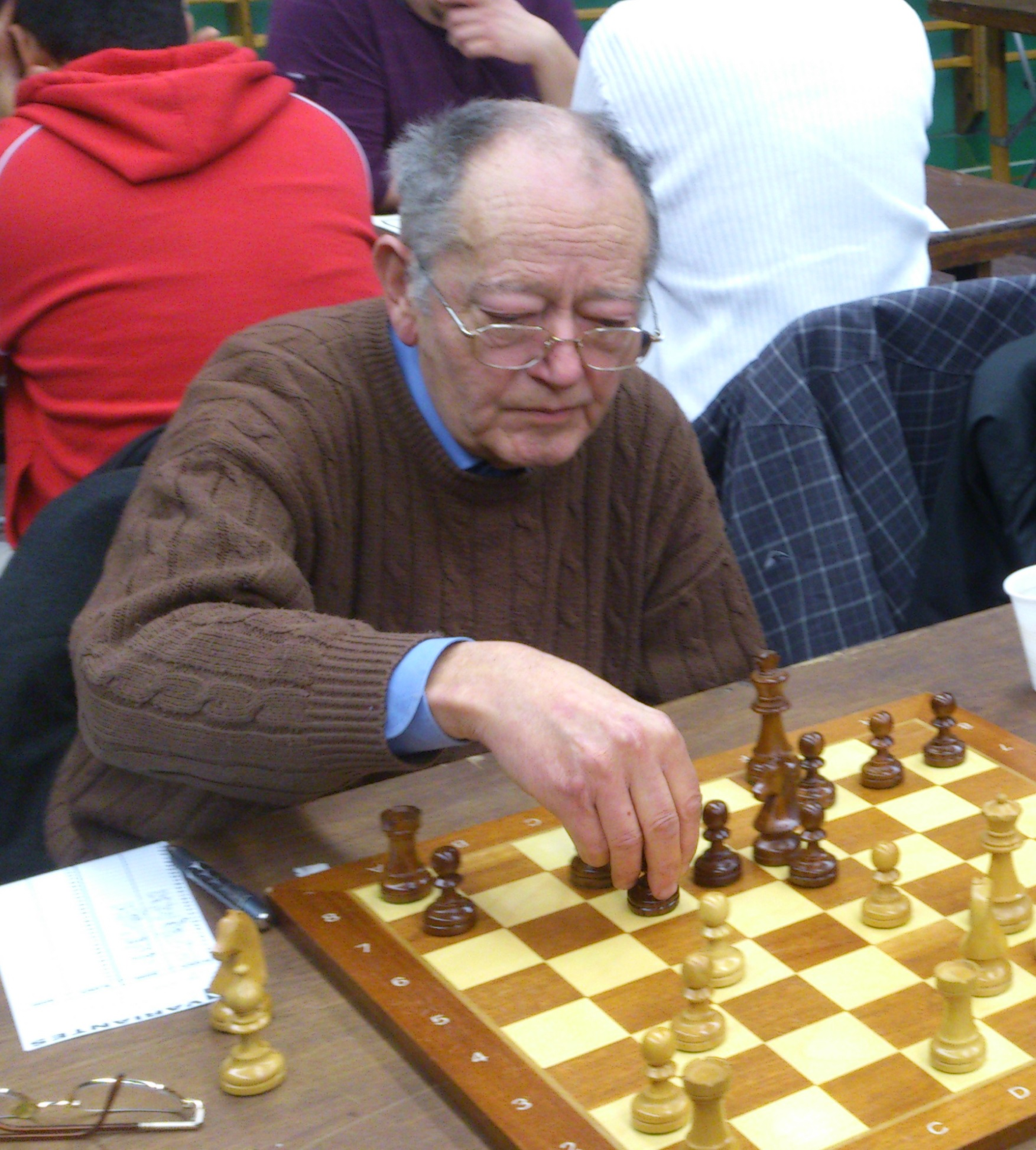

Personal information
- Born: 28 February 1938 Pleven, Bulgaria
- Died: 13 March 2021 (aged 83)

Chess career
- Country: Bulgaria
- Title: Grandmaster (1979)
- Peak rating: 2490 (January 1976)

Nikola Spiridonov (Bulgarian: Никола Спиридонов; 28 February 1938 – 13 March 2021) was a Bulgarian chess player, who was awarded the title of grandmaster (GM) by FIDE in 1979. He was the Bulgarian national champion in 1969.

== Biography ==
From the early 1960s to the mid-1980s Spiridonov was one of the leading Bulgarian chess players. In 1969, he won Bulgarian Chess Championship. He finished second on two occasions, in 1975 and 1982. He was winner of many international chess tournaments, including shared first place with Helmut Pfleger in Rubinstein Memorial in Polanica-Zdrój (1971).

Spiridonov played for Bulgaria in the Chess Olympiad:

- In 1964, at second reserve board in the 16th Chess Olympiad in Tel Aviv (+4, =3, -2).

He played for Bulgaria in the European Team Chess Championships:

- In 1970, at eighth board in the 4th European Team Chess Championship in Kapfenberg (+0, =3, -2),
- In 1980, at second reserve board in the 7th European Team Chess Championship in Skara (+3, =0, -2) and won individual bronze medal,
- In 1983, at eighth board in the 8th European Team Chess Championship in Plovdiv (+2, =3, -1) and won individual bronze medal.

Also Nikola Spiridonov four times played for Bulgaria in the World Student Team Chess Championships (1961, 1964, 1965, 1966) and won individual gold medal (1965). He was awarded the FIDE titles of International Master (IM) in 1970 and Grandmaster (GM) in 1979.
