= Iva Videnova =

Bulgarian chess player

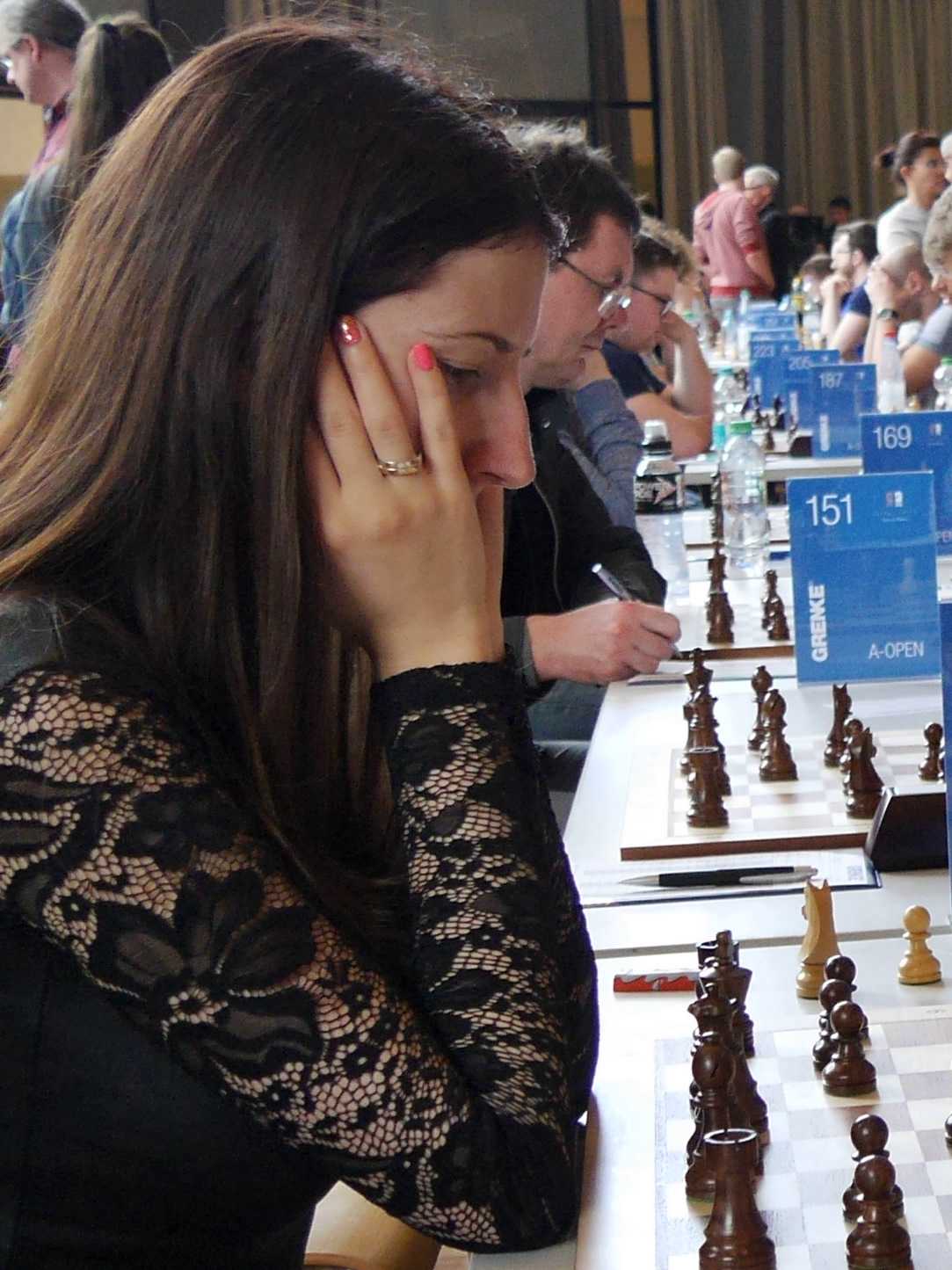
- Iva Videnova, 2018 in Karlsruhe

Personal information
- Born: 17 October 1987 (age 38) Sofia, Bulgaria

Chess career
- Country: Bulgaria
- Title: International Master (2015); Woman Grandmaster (2011)
- Peak rating: 2401 (February 2015)

Iva Videnova (Bulgarian: Ива Виденова; born 17 October 1987 in Sofia) is a Bulgarian chess player. She was awarded by FIDE the titles Woman Grandmaster (WGM) in 2011 and International Master (IM) in 2015. Her current chess clubs are "Lokomotiv-2000" from Plovdiv, Bulgaria, with which she has won two national championships, "Schwäbisch Hall" from Schwäbisch Hall, Germany, and "Liburnija" from Rijeka, Croatia.

Videnova learnt to play chess at the age of four, but only at the age of 13 did she take part for the first time in an official chess tournament. In 2002, she won the Bulgarian championship for girls under 16, and in 2006 the Bulgarian championship for girls under 20. In 2007 and 2008 Videnova became the Bulgarian women's champion in blitz chess. She won the Bulgarian Women's Chess Championship in 2012, 2013 and 2014.

Videnova has played for the Bulgarian national team in the Women's Chess Olympiad since 2010 and Women's European Team Chess Championship since 2009. In the 2011 Women's European Team Championship, held in Porto Carras, Greece, she won the individual bronze medal on board two thanks to her score of 6/9 points.
