= Svetla Yordanova =

Bulgarian chess player

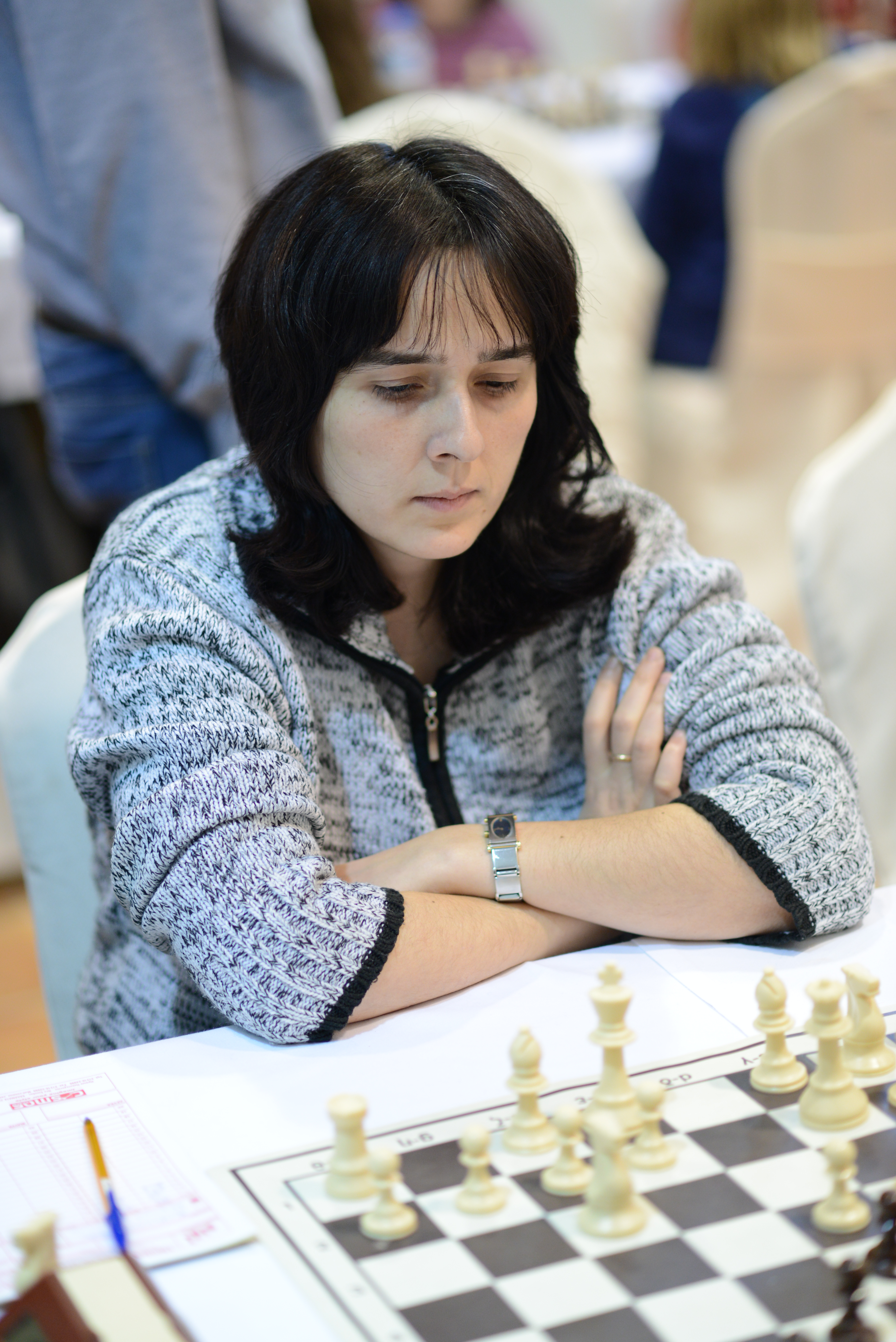
- Yordanova in 2013

Personal information
- Born: 8 May 1976 (age 50)

Chess career
- Country: Bulgaria
- Title: FIDE Woman Intl. Master (2008); ICCF Lady Grandmaster (2011)
- FIDE rating: 2097 (September 2019)
- Peak rating: 2248 (October 2006)
- ICCF rating: 2308 (April 2019)
- ICCF peak rating: 2350 (April 2012)

Svetla Yordanova (Bulgarian: Светла Йорданова, née Besheva; born 8 May 1976) is a Bulgarian chess player and winner of the 2015 Women's Bulgarian Chess Championship.

In over-the-board chess, she received the FIDE titles of Woman FIDE Master (WFM) in 2007 and Woman International Master (WIM) in 2008. In correspondence chess, she received the ICCF titles of Lady International Master (LIM) in 2010 and Lady Grandmaster (LGM) in 2011.

Yordanova became an FIDE Arbiter in 2011 and an International Arbiter in 2013.
