= Kiril Georgiev =

Bulgarian chess grandmaster (born 1965)

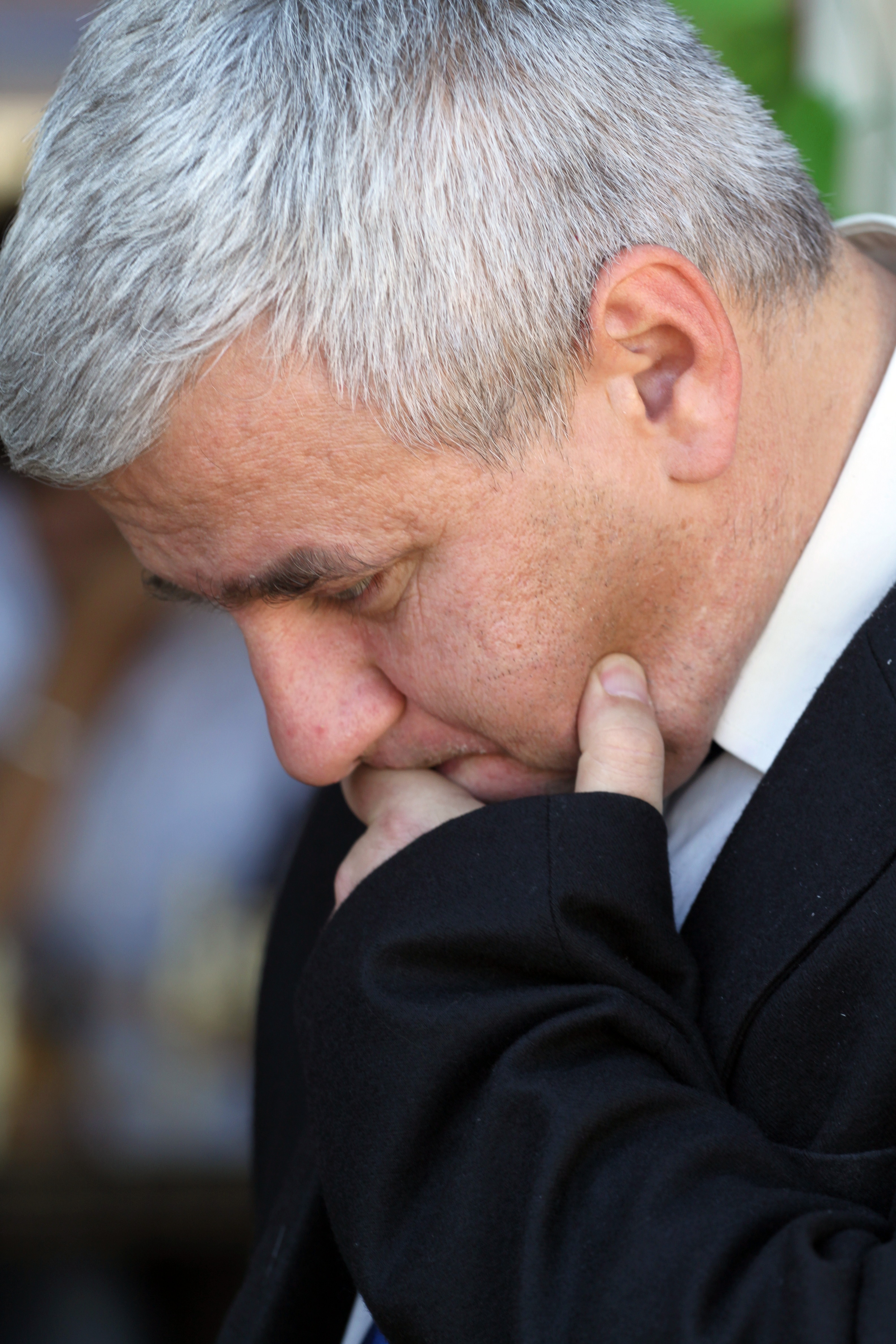
- Georgiev in 2011

Personal information
- Born: 28 November 1965 (age 60) Petrich, Bulgaria

Chess career
- Country: Bulgaria (Note: Georgiev represented Bulgaria until 2002, then from 2004 to 2018, and again since 2024.); North Macedonia (Note: Georgiev represented North Macedonia from 2002 to 2004, and from 2018 to 2024.)
- Title: Grandmaster (1985)
- FIDE rating: 2520 (September 2026)
- Peak rating: 2695 (July 2001)
- Peak ranking: No. 9 (January 1993)

Kiril Dimitrov Georgiev (Bulgarian: Кирил Димитров Георгиев; born 28 November 1965 in Petrich) is a Bulgarian and Macedonian chess grandmaster, and seven-time Bulgarian Chess Champion.

From 2002 to 2004, he was affiliated to the Macedonian Chess Federation, to which he returned in July 2018, after playing under the FIDE banner.

== Chess career ==
Georgiev first caught the eye of the chess world in 1983, when he became the World Junior Champion with an unusually strong score of 11½ out of 13. This result automatically gave him the International Master title. Two years later, FIDE awarded him the Grandmaster title.

In the process of becoming the Bulgarian Champion of 1984 (shared), 1986 and 1989, he rapidly became recognised as Bulgaria's number one player, taking over from Ivan Radulov and eventually giving way to Veselin Topalov. He has represented his country at the Chess Olympiad many times, playing on either board 1 or 2. Exceptionally, in 2002 he played for Macedonia, while he was temporarily resident there.

At the 1988 World Blitz Championship in Saint John, Canada, Kiril Georgiev finished third after eliminating world champion Garry Kasparov (3 - 1) in the quarterfinal. In the semifinal he lost to Rafael Vaganian (3.5 - 4.5). The tournament was eventually won by Mikhail Tal.

Although he has never reached supergrandmaster status (Elo 2700 or above), he has had major tournament victories in international competition. He was a winner at Sarajevo 1986 (and would meet board boy Ivan Sokolov there again, some 15 years later), San Bernardino 1988, Elenite (Burgas) 1992 (ahead of Sokolov, Topalov, Josif Dorfman, Yuri Razuvayev and Vassilios Kotronias) and the 1993 Budapest Zonal (ahead of Judit Polgár and Ľubomír Ftáčnik). He repeated his Elenite success in 1995 (with Topalov, ahead of Nigel Short, Boris Gulko and Sergey Dolmatov) and won at Belgrade 2000 (ahead of Alexander Beliavsky and Ulf Andersson).

Since 2000, his tournament successes continued. First at Sarajevo 2001 (his first Category 16 tournament win - ahead of Topalov, Ilya Smirin, Alexei Dreev and Ivan Sokolov) and first at Bad Wörishofen 2002. At Gibraltar Chess Festival, he was joint winner (with Levon Aronian, Zahar Efimenko, Alexei Shirov and Emil Sutovsky) in 2005 and the outright winner in 2006 (ahead of Short, Sutovsky, Shirov, Vladimir Akopian and Viktor Bologan) with an 8½/10 score. This was also the year that he won a bronze medal at the European Individual Chess Championship (behind Zdenko Kožul and Vassily Ivanchuk). At the Aeroflot Open in Moscow, he finished only a half point off the lead.

Accordingly, these results have caused his Elo rating to advance rapidly during 2005 and 2006, reaching 2680 in July 2006, and placing him at number 26 in the (FIDE) World's 100 top players.

Georgiev has also participated in the World Chess Championship cycle. In 1990, he qualified for the Interzonal Tournament in Manila and placed a creditable 14th out of 64, surpassing expectation and losing only to Alexei Dreev. At Groningen in 1997, he lost in round 4 to Loek van Wely. In December 2009, he tied for 1st-4th with Georg Meier, Julio Granda and Viktor Láznička in the 19th Magistral Pamplona Tournament. In 2010, he came third at the World Chess Open in León. In 2011 he won the 29th Andorra Open.

In 2009, he broke the world record for the most simultaneous chess games played: 360 games in just over 14 hours. He won 284, drew 70 and lost 6 for a total score of 88%. A score of at least 80% was required for the record to be accepted.

He won the Bulgarian championship again for three consecutive years, in 2013, 2014 and 2015, and again in 2023.

== Books ==
- Squeezing the Gambits: The Benko, Budapest, Albin, and Blumenfeld (Chess Stars, 2010)
