= Yulian Radulski =

Bulgarian chess grandmaster (1972–2013)

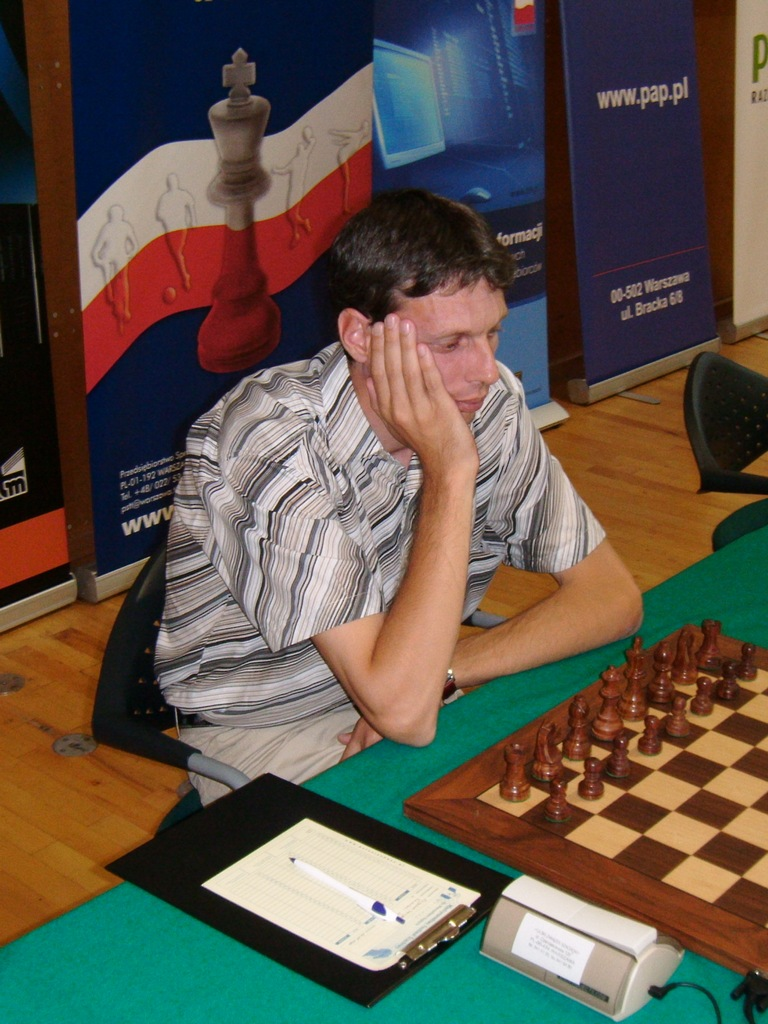
- Radulski in 2010

Personal information
- Born: 24 May 1972 Plovdiv, Bulgaria
- Died: 16 February 2013 (aged 40) Plovdiv, Bulgaria

Chess career
- Country: Bulgaria
- Title: Grandmaster (2004)
- Peak rating: 2606 (November 2010)

Yulian Radulski (sometimes also transliterated as Julian Radulski or Yuliyan Radulski) (Bulgarian: Юлиян Радулски; 24 May 1972 – 16 February 2013), was a Bulgarian chess Grandmaster. Actively practicing chess since 1983 and attaining the GM title in 2004, he represented his country in Chess Olympiads and was the Bulgarian chess champion for 2011.
