= Nino Kirov =

Bulgarian chess grandmaster (1945–2008)

Personal information
- Born: 11 September 1945 Dolna Dzhumaya, Bulgaria
- Died: 25 September 2008 (aged 63) Sofia, Bulgaria

Chess career
- Country: Bulgaria
- Title: Grandmaster (1975)
- Peak rating: 2505 (January 1993)

Nino Kirov (Bulgarian: Нино Киров; 11 September 1945 – 25 September 2008) was a Bulgarian chess Grandmaster (GM) (1975), two-times Bulgarian Chess Championship winner (1973, 1978).

== Biography ==
In the 1970s and 1980s Nino Kirov was one of the leading Bulgarian chess players. In 1962, he won Bulgarian Junior Chess Championship. From 1971 to 1985 Nino Kirov participated in Bulgarian Chess Championships and two times won gold medal: 1973 and 1978.

Nino Kirov was winner of many international chess tournament awards, including first place or shared first place in Čoka (1973), Vršac (1975), Białystok (1978), Thessaloniki (1978), Warsaw (1980), Cannes (1996).

Nino Kirov played for Bulgaria in the Chess Olympiads:

- In 1974, at second reserve board in the 21st Chess Olympiad in Nice (+7, =3, -1),
- In 1984, at first reserve board in the 26th Chess Olympiad in Thessaloniki (+0, =5, -1).

Nino Kirov played for Bulgaria in the European Team Chess Championships:

- In 1977, at fifth board in the 6th European Team Chess Championship in Moscow (+1, =3, -1),
- In 1980, at fourth reserve board in the 7th European Team Chess Championship in Skara (+2, =3, -2).

Nino Kirov played for Bulgaria in the World Student Team Chess Championship:

- In 1972, at first board in the 19th World Student Team Chess Championship in Graz (+4, =9, -1).

Also Nino Kirov nine times played for Bulgaria in the Men's Chess Balkaniads (1974-1977, 1979-1981, 1984-1985) and won 1 gold (1974), 4 silver (1975, 1976, 1979, 1984) and 4 bronze (1977, 1980, 1981, 1985) medals in team competition, and won 3 gold (1974, 1979, 1985), 1 silver (1981) and 2 bronze (1976, 1977) medals in individual competition.

In 1972, he was awarded the FIDE International Master (IM) title and received the FIDE Grandmaster (GM) title three years later.
