= Pavlina Chilingirova =

Bulgarian chess player (born 1955)

Personal information
- Born: 22 October 1955 (age 70)

Chess career
- Country: Bulgaria
- Title: Woman International Master (1982)
- Peak rating: 2305 (January 1994)

Pavlina Chilingirova (Bulgarian: Павлина Чилингирова, also Pavlina Angelova (Bulgarian: Павлина Ангелова) (Note: FIDE rating records list her as Pavlina Angelova in January 1984, Pavlina Angelova-Chilingirova in January 1985, and Pavlina Chilingirova in her current profile.); born 22 October 1955) is a Bulgarian chess player who holds the FIDE title of Woman International Master (WIM, 1982). She is a Bulgarian Women Chess Champion (1993).

== Biography ==
In the 1980s and 1990s, she was one of the leading Bulgarian women's chess players. Chilingirova has participated in many Bulgarian women's chess championships where she won gold (1993), 2 silver (1981, 2007) and 6 bronzes (1980, 1986, 1989, 1990, 2004, 2006) medals. Several times she played in the Women's World Chess Championships zonal tournaments (1981, 1987, 1993, 1995). In 1988, Chilingirova won Dortmund international women's tournament. In 2007, she won Open Women Bulgarian Championship.

Chilingirova played for Bulgaria in the Women's Chess Olympiads:

- In 1980, at first reserve board in the 9th Chess Olympiad (women) in Valletta (+1, =4, -1),
- In 1982, at first reserve board in the 10th Chess Olympiad (women) in Lucerne (+5, =2, -3),
- In 1984, at third board in the 26th Chess Olympiad (women) in Thessaloniki (+5, =7, -0) and won team silver medal,
- In 1986, at third board in the 27th Chess Olympiad (women) in Dubai (+6, =2, -2),
- In 1988, at second board in the 28th Chess Olympiad (women) in Thessaloniki (+4, =2, -4),
- In 1990, at third board in the 29th Chess Olympiad (women) in Novi Sad (+5, =4, -1),
- In 1992, at third board in the 30th Chess Olympiad (women) in Manila (+6, =1, -4),
- In 1994, at first reserve board in the 31st Chess Olympiad (women) in Moscow (+2, =1, -4).

At the 1988 Thessaloniki Olympiad, Chilingirova played a famous 17-move game against 12-year-old Judit Polgár, who won after sacrificing her queen on the final move. The game is popularly knows as Angelova Death.

She played for Bulgaria in the European Team Chess Championships:

- In 1992, at fourth board in the 1st European Team Chess Championship (women) in Debrecen (+1, =0, -2),
- In 2007, at first reserve board in the 7th European Team Chess Championship (women) in Heraklion (+5, =1, -1) and won individual silver medal.

In 1982, Chilingirova was awarded the FIDE Woman International Master (WIM) title.
