= Stefka Savova =

Bulgarian chess player (born 1958)

Personal information
- Born: 28 November 1958 (age 67) Pazardzhik, Bulgaria

Chess career
- Country: Bulgaria
- Title: Woman International Master (1983)
- Peak rating: 2245 (January 1987)

Stefka Savova (Bulgarian: Стефка Савова; born 28 November 1958) is a Bulgarian chess player. She received the FIDE title of Woman International Master (WIM) in 1983 an is a Bulgarian Women Chess Champion (1986).

== Biography ==
In 1977, in Novi Sad, Savova won bronze medal in European Junior Chess Championship for under age 20. In the 1980s, she was one of the leading Bulgarian women's chess players. Savova has participated in many Bulgarian women's chess championships where she won gold (1986), 2 silver (1988, 2005) and bronze (1982) medals. In 1986, Savova won Athens international women's tournament Acropolis. Two times she played in the Women's World Chess Championships zonal tournaments (1987, 1989). In 2002, Savova won bronze medal in Balkan Women's Individual Chess Championship in Istanbul.

Stefka Savova played for Bulgaria in the Women's Chess Olympiads:

- In 1984, at first reserve board in the 26th Chess Olympiad (women) in Thessaloniki (+4, =3, -2) and won team silver medal,
- In 1986, at second board in the 27th Chess Olympiad (women) in Dubai (+5, =1, -5),
- In 1988, at third board in the 28th Chess Olympiad (women) in Thessaloniki (+5, =2, -2).

In 1983, Savova was awarded the FIDE Woman International Master (WIM) title.
