= Yury Toshev =

Bulgarian chess player

Yury Toshev (Bulgarian: Юрий Георгиев Тошев) (24 December 1907 – 19 April 1974) was a Bulgarian chess master.

He thrice won the Bulgarian Chess Championship: 1933 (jointly with Georgy Geshev but lost a play-off match to him), 1942, and 1947 (jointly with Kamen Piskov).

He represented Bulgaria in the 3rd unofficial Chess Olympiad at Munich 1936. After World War II, he twice played for Bulgaria in Balkaniad team tournaments, and won bronze medals at Belgrade 1946 and Sofia 1947.
