= Antonia Ivanova =

Bulgarian chess player (1930–2014)

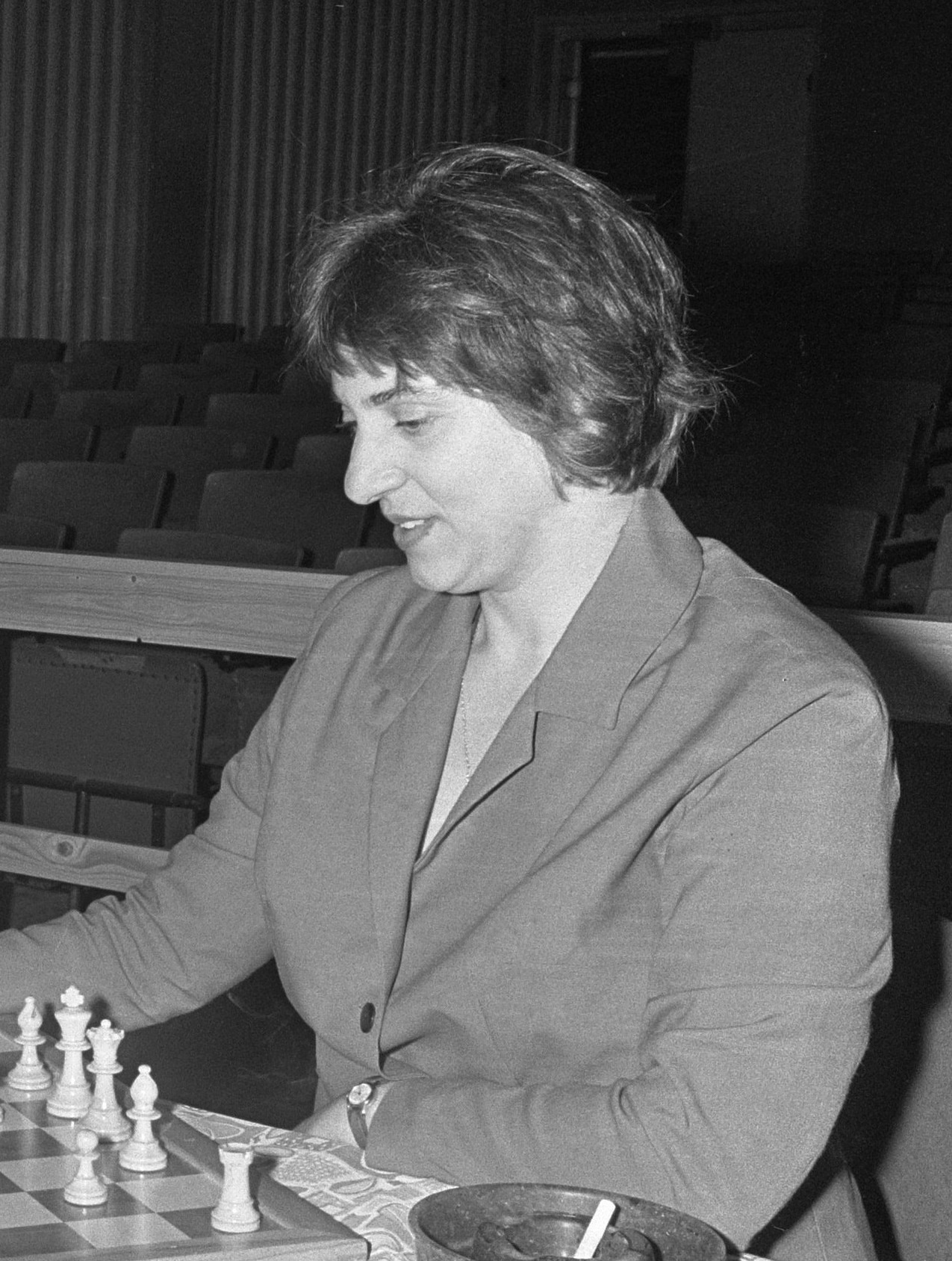
- Antonia Ivanova in 1966

Personal information
- Born: Антония Иванова; 12 May 1930 Sofia, Bulgaria
- Died: 25 May 2004 (aged 74) Sofia, Bulgaria
- Spouse: Milko Bobotsov

Chess career
- Country: Bulgaria
- Title: Woman Grandmaster (1983)

Antonia Petrova Ivanova (Bulgarian: Антония Петрова Иванова; 12 May 1930 – 25 May 2004) was a Bulgarian chess player with the title Woman Grandmaster.

She was born Sofia, and was the national girls' champion in 1948. A short time later she captured the first of her six Bulgarian Women's Championships. As the first very strong woman player in her country, she was chosen to be the subject of a propaganda film. Probably her best result in individual competition was the first place attained at the 1954 Leipzig zonal tournament. She became a Woman International Master in the same year and much later, in 1983, was honoured with the title Woman Grandmaster.

Antonia Ivanova was 6 times Bulgarian Women's Champion in 1951, 1952, 1954, 1957, 1958 and 1967.

She played for Bulgaria in two Chess Olympiads; Emmen 1957 (the Netherlands) and Split 1963 (Yugoslavia, today's Croatia).

She was married to the International Grandmaster Milko Bobotsov, but continued to play under her maiden name. She died in Sofia.
