= Antonina Dragašević =

Bulgarian and Serbian chess player

Personal information
- Born: 25 March 1948 (age 78) Varna, Bulgaria

Chess career
- Country: Bulgaria (before 1978); Yugoslavia → Serbia (after 1978)
- Title: Woman International Master (1972)
- FIDE rating: 2082 (July 2018)
- Peak rating: 2172 (January 2000)

Antonina Dragašević (Serbian: Антонина Драгашевић; born 25 March 1948), née Antonina Georgieva (Bulgarian: Антонина Георгиева), is a Bulgarian and Serbian chess player who holds the title of Woman International Master (WIM, 1972). She was a four-time winner of the Bulgarian Women's Chess Championship (1968, 1970, 1971, 1977).

== Biography ==
From the mid-1960s to the end of the 1970s, she was one of the leading Bulgarian women's chess players. She won Bulgarian Women's Chess Championship four times: 1968, 1970, 1971 and 1977. The winner of many international chess tournaments, including second place in Plovdiv (1974) and won Belgrade (1975). In 1972, Antonina Dragašević was awarded the FIDE Woman International Master (WIM) title.

In 1978, she married a Montenegrin chess player Srdja Dragašević, with whom she has a daughter Dolja Dragašević and a son Vuko Dragašević, and moved to Yugoslavia. After marriage Dragašević representing Yugoslavia in chess tournaments, but after breakup of Yugoslavia she represented Serbia.

Dragašević played for Bulgaria and Yugoslavia in the Women's Chess Olympiads:

- In 1966, at first reserve board in the 3rd Chess Olympiad (women) in Oberhausen (+2, =2, -2),
- In 1969, at first reserve board in the 4th Chess Olympiad (women) in Lublin (+5, =3, -2) and won the individual bronze medal,
- In 1972, at first board in the 5th Chess Olympiad (women) in Skopje (+3, =7, -1),
- In 1974, at second board in the 6th Chess Olympiad (women) in Medellín (+5, =3, -2) and won the team bronze medal,
- In 1980, at second board in the 9th Chess Olympiad (women) in Valletta (+3, =6, -3).

Actively participated in Senior Chess tournaments. In 2005, Antonina Dragašević took the 6th place in the World Senior Women's Championship Chess Championship, but in 2006 she took the 5th place in this tournament. In 2008, Antonina Dragašević won the 4th place in the European Senior Women's Championship Chess Championship.
