= Vesmina Shikova =

Bulgarian chess player

Personal information
- Full name: Vesmina W. Shikova
- Born: 3 October 1951 (age 74) Varna, Bulgaria

Chess career
- Country: Bulgaria
- Title: Woman Intl. Master (1971)
- Peak rating: 2175 (January 1989)

Vesmina W. Shikova (Bulgarian: Весмина Шикова; born 3 October 1951) is a Bulgarian chess player. She received the FIDE title of Woman International Master (WIM) in 1971 and won the Bulgarian Women's Chess Championship in 1972.

== Biography ==
From the end of 1960s to the mid-1980s, Vesmina Shikova was one of the leading Bulgarian women's chess players. She participated several times in Bulgarian Women's Chess Championship and won eleven medals: gold (1972), silver (1978) and nine bronze (1968, 1969, 1970, 1971, 1973, 1977, 1982, 1984, 1985). In 1972, in Pernik Vesmina Shikova participated in Women's World Chess Championship European Zonal tournament, where shared 13th-14th place. She won Women's International chess tournament in Halle (1969) and shared the 2nd place in Sofia (1970).

Vesmina Shikova played for Bulgaria in the Women's Chess Olympiads:

- In 1972, at first reserve board in the 5th Chess Olympiad (women) in Skopje (+1, =0, -1),
- In 1978, at third board in the 8th Chess Olympiad (women) in Buenos Aires (+5, =4, -3).
