= Petar Velikov =

Bulgarian chess grandmaster (born 1951)

Personal information
- Born: March 30, 1951 (age 75) Dobrich, Bulgaria

Chess career
- Country: Bulgaria
- Title: Grandmaster (1982)
- Peak rating: 2500 (July 1998)

Petar Velikov (Bulgarian: Петър Великов; born March 30, 1951, in Dobrich) is a Bulgarian chess player, who won the Bulgarian Chess Championship in 1987. He has represented Bulgaria in four Chess Olympiads (1982, 1984, 1986, 1990) and was awarded the Grandmaster title in 1982. He is a medical doctor by profession.

== Tournament victories ==
- Ulm 1971;
- Wrocław 1976;
- Reggio Emilia 1980;
- Primorsko 1986;
- Acropolis 1989;
- Besançon 2003;
- Paris 2004;
- Paris 2005.
