= Georgy Geshev =

Bulgarian chess player

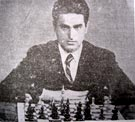
Georgy Geshev (20 January 1927)

Georgy (Georgi) Geshev (Geschew) (Bulgarian: Георги Христов Гешев) (born October 8, 1903, in Sofia – died July 15, 1937) was a Bulgarian chess master.

At the beginning of his career, he tied for 6-7th at Varna 1926 (K. Atanasov, G. Slavchev, and A. Telegin won), shared 1st with Pinkas at Sofia 1927, won at Trnovo 1928, and took 2nd, behind A. Gyurov, at Sofia 1929.

He won the Bulgarian Chess Championship four times (1933 – jointly, 1934, 1935, and 1936. At the play-off match for the 1933 title, he triumphed against Yury Toshev (4½ : 3½), to become the first official Bulgarian Champion.

Geshev represented Bulgaria on first board at the 3rd unofficial Chess Olympiad held in Munich 1936.
