= Valentin Iotov =

Bulgarian chess player

Personal information
- Full name: Valentin Lyubomirov Iotov
- Born: 6 September 1988 (age 37) Pleven, Bulgaria

Chess career
- Country: Bulgaria
- Title: Grandmaster (2008)
- FIDE rating: 2485 (July 2026)
- Peak rating: 2603 (July 2009)

Valentin Lyubomirov Iotov (Bulgarian: Валентин Любомиров Йотов, also transliterated Yotov; born 6 September 1988 in Pleven) is a Bulgarian chess player received the FIDE title of Grandmaster in 2008. He has represented his country in Chess Olympiads and was the Bulgarian chess champion for 2006. In August 2014, Yotov played on Board 3 for Bulgaria at the Chess Olympiad in Tromsø, scoring 8/11 points for a performance rating of 2741, narrowly missing out on an individual bronze medal.

There is also a different Bulgarian chess player also known as Valentin Iotov (full name: Valentin Dimitrov Iotov) who received the ICCF title of Correspondence Chess Grandmaster in 2012.
