= Bulgarian Chess Championship =

The Bulgarian Chess Championship is an event inaugurated in 1933 to crown the best chess player in Bulgaria. The championship has been held on a nearly annual basis since, with only a few years missed. In recent years some of the very best Bulgarian players have not participated in the championship, including former World Champions Veselin Topalov and Antoaneta Stefanova.

== Open championship ==
#	Year	City	Men's Champion	Comment
1	1933	Varna	Georgy Geshev	Geshev defeated Yury Toshev (4.5 : 3.5) in a play-off match
2	1934	Sofia	Georgy Geshev	
3	1935	Rousse	Georgy Geshev	
4	1936	Sofia	Georgy Geshev	
5	1937	Sofia	Oleg Neikirch	
6	1938	Varna	Oleg Neikirch	
7	1940	Sofia	Alexander Tsvetkov; Oleg Neikirch	
8	1942	Sofia	Yury Toshev	
9	1943	Sofia	Oleg Neikirch	
10	1945	Sofia	Alexander Tsvetkov	Svetozar Gligoric won (off contest)
11	1946	Sofia	Peter Petrov	
12	1947	Sofia	Kamen Piskov; Yury Toshev	
13	1948	Sofia	Oleg Neikirch; Alexander Tsvetkov	
14	1949	Sofia	Krstiu Krstev Dimitrov	
15	1950	Sofia	Alexander Tsvetkov	
16	1951	Sofia	Alexander Tsvetkov; Nikolay Minev; Milko Bobotsov	Tsvetkov won ahead of Bobotsov and Minev in BUL-ch playoffs in January 1952
17	1952	Sofia	Zdravko Milev	
18	1953	Sofia	Nikolay Minev; Oleg Neikirch	
19	1954	Sofia	Nikola Padevsky	
20	1955	Sofia	Nikola Padevsky	
21	1957	Sofia	Oleg Neikirch	
22	1958	Sofia	Milko Bobotsov	
23	1959	Sofia	Vladilen Todorov Popov	
24	1960	Sofia	Zdravko Milev	
25	1961	Sofia	Zdravko Milev	
26	1962	Sofia	Nikola Padevsky	
27	1963	Sofia	Georgi Tringov	
28	1964	Sofia	Nikola Padevsky	Padevsky defeated Atanas Kolarov (2.5 : 1.5) in a play-off match
29	1965	Varna	Nikolay Minev	
30	1966	Sofia	Nikolay Minev	
31	1968	Sofia	Peicho Chanev Peev	
32	1969	Plovdiv	Nikola Spiridonov	
33	1970	Sofia	Lyuben Stoyanov Popov	
34	1971	Sofia	Ivan Radulov	
35	1972	Sofia	Sarkis Stepn Bohosjan	
36	1973	Sofia	Evgenij Ermenkov	
37	1973	Sofia	Nino Kirov	
38	1974	Asenovgrad	Ivan Radulov	
39	1975	Pernik	Evgenij Ermenkov	Match-tournament: 1. Ermenkov; 2. Nikola Spiridonov 3. Nikolai Radev
40	1976	Sofia	Evgenij Ermenkov	
41	1977	Sofia	Ivan Radulov	
42	1978	Vratza	Nino Kirov	
43	1979	Sofia	Evgenij Ermenkov	Ermenkov defeated Krum Georgiev in a play-off match
44	1980	Sofia	Ivan Radulov	Radulov defeated Ventzislav Inkiov (2 : 1) in a play-off match
45	1981	Sofia	Georgi Tringov	
46	1982	Sofia	Ventzislav Inkiov	Inkiov defeated Valentin Lukov in a play-off match
47	1983	Pernik	Dimitar Donchev	
48	1984	Sofia	Kiril Georgiev	
49	1985	Sofia	Georgi Tringov	
50	1986	Sofia	Kiril Georgiev	
51	1987	Elenite	Petar Velikov	
52	1988	Sofia	Dimitar Donchev	
53	1989	Sofia	Kiril Georgiev	
54	1990	Sofia	Vasil Spasov	
55	1991	Pazardzhik	Boris Chatalbashev	
56	1992	Bankya	Atanas Kolev	
57	1993	Pirdop	Petar Genov	
58	1994	Sofia	Aleksander Delchev	
59	1995	Sofia	Vladimir Georgiev	
60	1996	Sofia	Aleksander Delchev	
61	1997	Shumen	Vasil Spasov	
62	1998	Dupnitsa	Boris Chatalbashev	
63	1999	Plovdiv	Petar Genov	
64	2000	Asenovgrad	Vasil Spasov	
65	2001	Tsarevo	Aleksander Delchev	
66	2002	Sofia	Marijan Petrov	
67	2003	Sofia	Vasil Spasov	
68	2004	Sofia	Ivan Cheparinov	
69	2005	Pleven	Ivan Cheparinov	
70	2006	Svilengrad	Valentin Iotov	
71	2007	Pernik	Boris Chatalbashev	
72	2008	Plovdiv	Vasil Spasov	
73	2009	Blagoevgrad	Dejan Bojkov	
74	2010	Kiustendil	Boris Chatalbashev	
75	2011	Bankya	Julian Radulski	
76	2012	Panagyurishte	Ivan Cheparinov	
77	2013	Bankya	Kiril Georgiev	
78	2014	Kozloduy	Kiril Georgiev	
79	2015	Pleven	Kiril Georgiev	
80	2016	Pleven	Momchil Nikolov	
81	2017	Montana	Marian Petrov	
82	2018	Kozloduy	Ivan Cheparinov	
83	2019	Kozloduy	Aleksander Delchev	
84	2020	Sofia	Martin Petrov	
	2023	Sofia	Kiril Georgiev	half a point ahead of 2017 Women's champion Nurgyul Salimova

== Women's championship ==
#	Year	City	Women's Champion
1	1951		Antonia Ivanova
2	1952		Antonia Ivanova
3	1953		Venka Asenova
4	1954		Antonia Ivanova
5	1955		Paunka Todorova
6	1956		Venka Asenova
7	1957		Antonia Ivanova
8	1958		Antonia Ivanova
9	1960		Venka Asenova
10	1961		Venka Asenova
11	1962		Venka Asenova
12	1963		Venka Asenova
13	1964		Paunka Todorova
14	1965		Venka Asenova
15	1966		Venka Asenova
16	1967		Antonia Ivanova
17	1968		Antonina Georgieva
18	1969		Venka Asenova
19	1970		Antonina Georgieva
20	1971		Antonina Georgieva
21	1972		Vesmina Shikova
22	1973		Evelina Trojanska
23	1974		Tatjana Lematschko
24	1975		Tatjana Lematschko
25	1976		Borislava Borisova-Ornstein
26	1977		Antonina Georgieva
27	1978		Tatjana Lematschko
28	1979		Tatjana Lematschko
29	1980		Rumiana Bojadjieva-Gocheva
30	1981		Tatjana Lematschko
31	1982	Sofia	Rumiana Bojadjieva-Gocheva; Margarita Voiska
32	1983		Margarita Voiska
33	1984		Rumiana Bojadjieva-Gocheva; Margarita Voiska
34	1985		Marlen Petrova
35	1986		Stefka Savova
36	1987	Sofia	Rumiana Bojadjieva-Gocheva
37	1988		Ruzka Genova
38	1989	Sofia	Rumiana Bojadjieva-Gocheva
39	1990		Vera Peicheva
40	1991	Bankya	Rumiana Bojadjieva-Gocheva
41	1992	Pernik	Maja Koen
42	1993		Pavlina Chilingirova
43	1994		Maja Koen
44	1995		Antoaneta Stefanova
45	1996		Maria Velcheva
46	1997		Maria Velcheva
47	1998		Margarita Voiska
48	1999		Maria Velcheva
49	2000		Maria Velcheva
50	2001	Plovdiv	Maria Velcheva
51	2002	Plovdiv	Margarita Voiska
52	2003	Sofia	Margarita Voiska
53	2004	Sofia	Margarita Voiska
54	2005	Veliko Tarnovo	Liubka Georgieva-Genova
55	2006	Svilengrad	Margarita Voiska
56	2007	Pernik	Margarita Voiska
57	2008	Plovdiv	Elitsa Raeva
58	2009	Dupnitsa	Margarita Voiska
59	2010	Dupnitsa	Margarita Voiska
60	2011	Bankya	Adriana Nikolova
61	2012	Panagyurishte	Iva Videnova
62	2013	Bankya	Iva Videnova
63	2014	Kozloduy	Iva Videnova
64	2015	Pleven	Svetla Yordanova
65	2016	Pleven	Elitsa Raeva
66	2017	Pleven	Nurgyul Salimova
67	2018	Chavdar	Viktoria Radeva
68	2019	Chavdar	Viktoria Radeva
69	2020	Sofia	Beloslava Krasteva

== Sources ==
- Whyld, Ken (1986), Chess: The Records, Guinness Books, p. 94, ISBN 0-85112-455-0 (results through 1985)
- Bojkov, Dejan (2007-03-24), The Bulgarian Chess Championship 2007, Chessbase.com News
- Crowther, Mark (21 May 2001), The Week in Chess 341, London Chess Center
- Crowther, Mark (19 May 2003), The Week in Chess 445, London Chess Center
- Crowther, Mark (11 May 2004), The Week in Chess 496, London Chess Center
- Crowther, Mark (6 June 2005), The Week in Chess 552, London Chess Center
- Crowther, Mark (13 March 2006), The Week in Chess 592, London Chess Center
- Crowther, Mark (19 March 2007), The Week in Chess 645, London Chess Center
