= Nikolay Minev =

Bulgarian chess player (1931–2017)

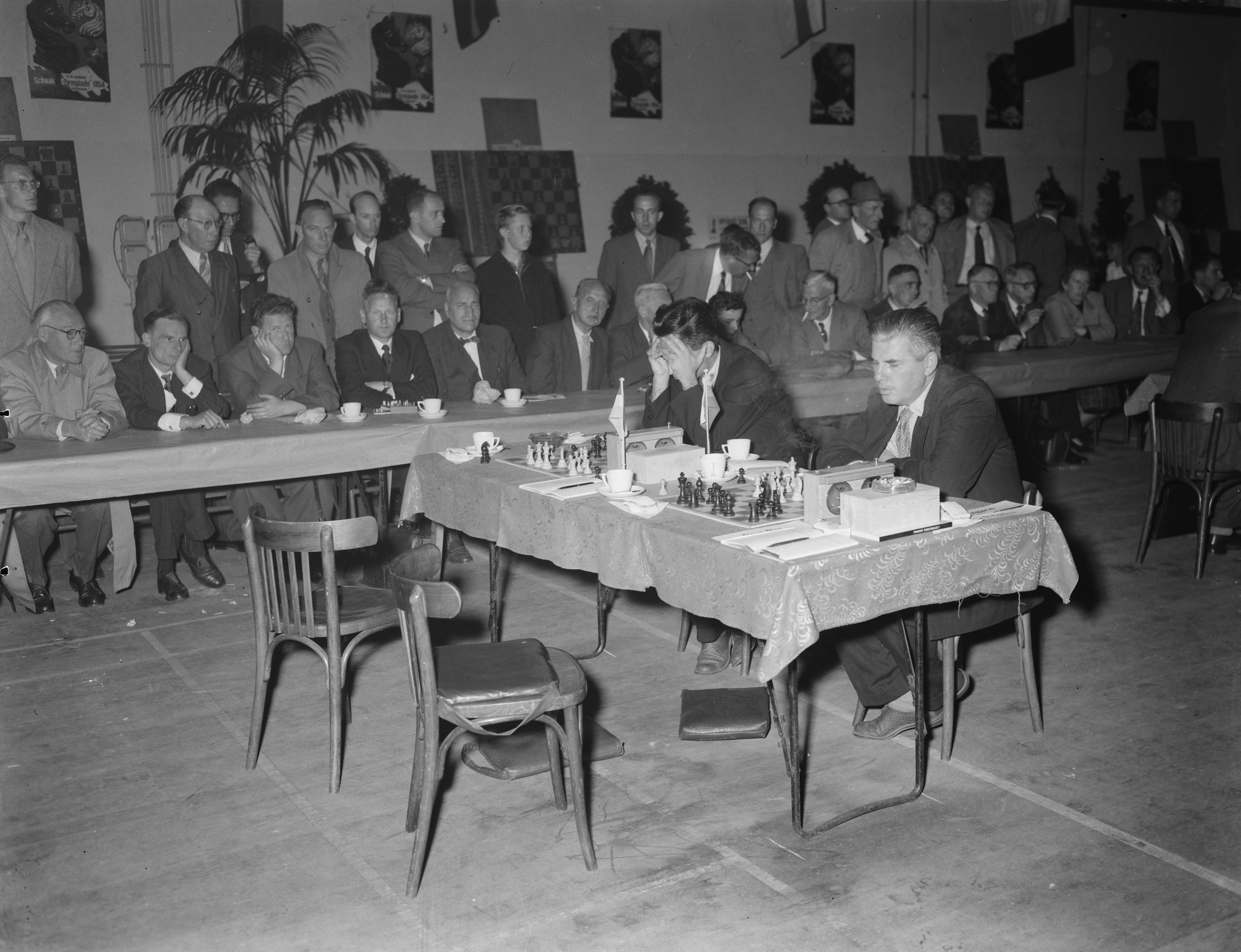

Personal information
- Born: November 8, 1931 Rousse, Bulgaria
- Died: March 10, 2017 (aged 85) Seattle, Washington

Chess career
- Country: Bulgaria
- Title: International Master (1960)
- Peak rating: 2455 (July 1971)

Nikolay (or Nikolai) Nikolaev Minev (Bulgarian: Николай Николаев Минев, 8 November 1931 – 10 March 2017) was a Bulgarian chess International Master (IM) and noted chess author.

Minev was born on 8 November 1931, in Rousse, Bulgaria. He was awarded the IM title by FIDE in 1960. He was the champion of Bulgaria in 1953, 1965, and 1966. He played for Bulgaria in the Chess Olympiad six times (1954, 1956, 1958, 1960, 1962, and 1966). Minev's best international results were: third at Varna in 1960, second at Warsaw in 1961, а tie for first at Sombor in 1966, and second at Albena in 1975. He contributed to early editions of the Encyclopaedia of Chess Openings and the Encyclopaedia of Chess Endings (see Chess endgame literature). Minev and his wife emigrated to the United States in the mid-1980s and settled in Seattle, Washington. He was associated with Grandmaster Yasser Seirawan and his magazine Inside Chess in the 1980s and 1990s.

He died on 10 March 2017 in Seattle.

== Books ==
- Minev, Nikolay; Bobekov, Radko; Milev, Zdravko (1961), Shahmatni Kombinatsii, Sofia: Meditsina i Fizkultura
- Minev, Nikolay (1967), Karo-Kan, Sofia: Meditsina i Fizkultura
- Minev, Nikolay (1969), Strategia i Taktika na Shahmata, Sofia: Meditsina i Fizkultura
- Minev, Nikolay; Neikirch, Oleg (1972), Parvi Stapki v Shahmata, Sofia: Meditsina i Fizkultura
- Minev, Nikolay (1976), Sitsilianska Zashtita – Variant "Drakon", Sofia: Meditsina i Fizkultura
- Minev, Nikolay; Yuchormanski, Nikolay (1978), Bulgaria na Shahmatnite Olimpiadi, Sofia: Meditsina i Fizkultura
- Minev, Nikolay; Kaykamdzhozov, Zhivko (1980), Klasichesko Benoni, Sofia: Meditsina i Fizkultura
- Minev, Nikolay (1980), Ednotopovni Endshpili, Sofia: Meditsina i Fizkultura
- Minev, Nikolay (1988), French Defense: New and Forgotten Ideas!, Thinkers Press, ISBN 978-0-938650-36-2
- Minev, Nikolay; Seirawan, Yasser (1991), Take My Rooks, Seattle: International Chess Enterprises, ISBN 978-1-879479-01-2
- Minev, Nikolay; Seirawan, Yasser; Donaldson, John (1992), Alekhine in the Americas, Seattle: International Chess Enterprises, ISBN 978-1-879479-06-7
- Minev; Seirawan, Yasser (1993), B12: Caro-Kann, Šahovski Informator
- Minev, Nikolay; Seirawan, Yasser; Donaldson, John (1993), Alekhine in Europe and Asia, Seattle: International Chess Enterprises, ISBN 978-1-879479-12-8
- Minev, Nikolay (1993), King's Indian Defense: Tactics, Ideas, Exercises, Seattle: International Chess Enterprises, ISBN 978-1-879479-13-5
- Minev, Nikolay; Donaldson, John (1994), Akiba Rubinstein: Uncrowned King, Seattle: International Chess Enterprises, ISBN 978-1-879479-19-7
- Minev, Nikolay; Donaldson, John (1995), Akiba Rubinstein: The Later Years, Seattle: International Chess Enterprises, ISBN 978-1-879479-27-2
- Minev, Nikolay (1995), The Sicilian Defense: Last Decade (1986-1995), 250 Good and Bad Ideas, Seattle: International Chess Enterprises, ISBN 978-1-879479-28-9
- Minev, Nikolay (1996), Caro-Kann: Fantasy Variation, Seattle: The Chess Library, ISBN 978-0-9661889-0-5
- Minev, Nikolay (1997), Miguel Najdorf: King of the King's Indian Defense, Seattle: The Chess Library, ISBN 978-0-9661889-1-2
- Minev, Nikolay (1998), French Defense 2: New and Forgotten Ideas! (2nd ed.), Thinkers Press, ISBN 978-0-938650-92-8
- Minev, Nikolay (2000), Mastering Tactical Ideas, Seattle: International Chess Enterprises, ISBN 978-1-879479-83-8
- Minev, Nikolay (2003), Dutch Defense: New and Forgotten Ideas!, Thinkers Press, ISBN 978-1-888710-01-4
- Minev, Nikolay (2005), A Practical Guide to Rook End Games, Russell Enterprises, ISBN 978-1-888690-22-4
- Minev, Nikolay; Donaldson, John (2007), Akiba Rubinstein: Uncrowned King (2nd ed.), Russell Enterprises, ISBN 978-1-888690-29-3
- Minev, Nikolay (2008), David Bronstein: Fifty Great Short Games, Seattle: The Chess Library, ISBN 978-0-9661889-2-9
- Minev, Nikolay (2008), Tony Miles: Fifty Great Short Games, Seattle: The Chess Library, ISBN 978-0-9661889-3-6
- Minev, Nikolay (2008), Rudolf Spielmann: Fifty Great Short Games, Seattle: The Chess Library, ISBN 978-0-9661889-4-3
- Minev, Nikolay; Donaldson, John (2012), Akiba Rubinstein: The Later Years (2nd ed.), Russell Enterprises, ISBN 978-1-9364903-9-4
- Minev, Nikolay (2012), Mikhail Chigorin and Dawid Janowsky: Fifty Great Short Games, Seattle: The Chess Library, ISBN 978-0-9661889-5-0
