= Boris Chatalbashev =

Bulgarian chess grandmaster (born 1974)

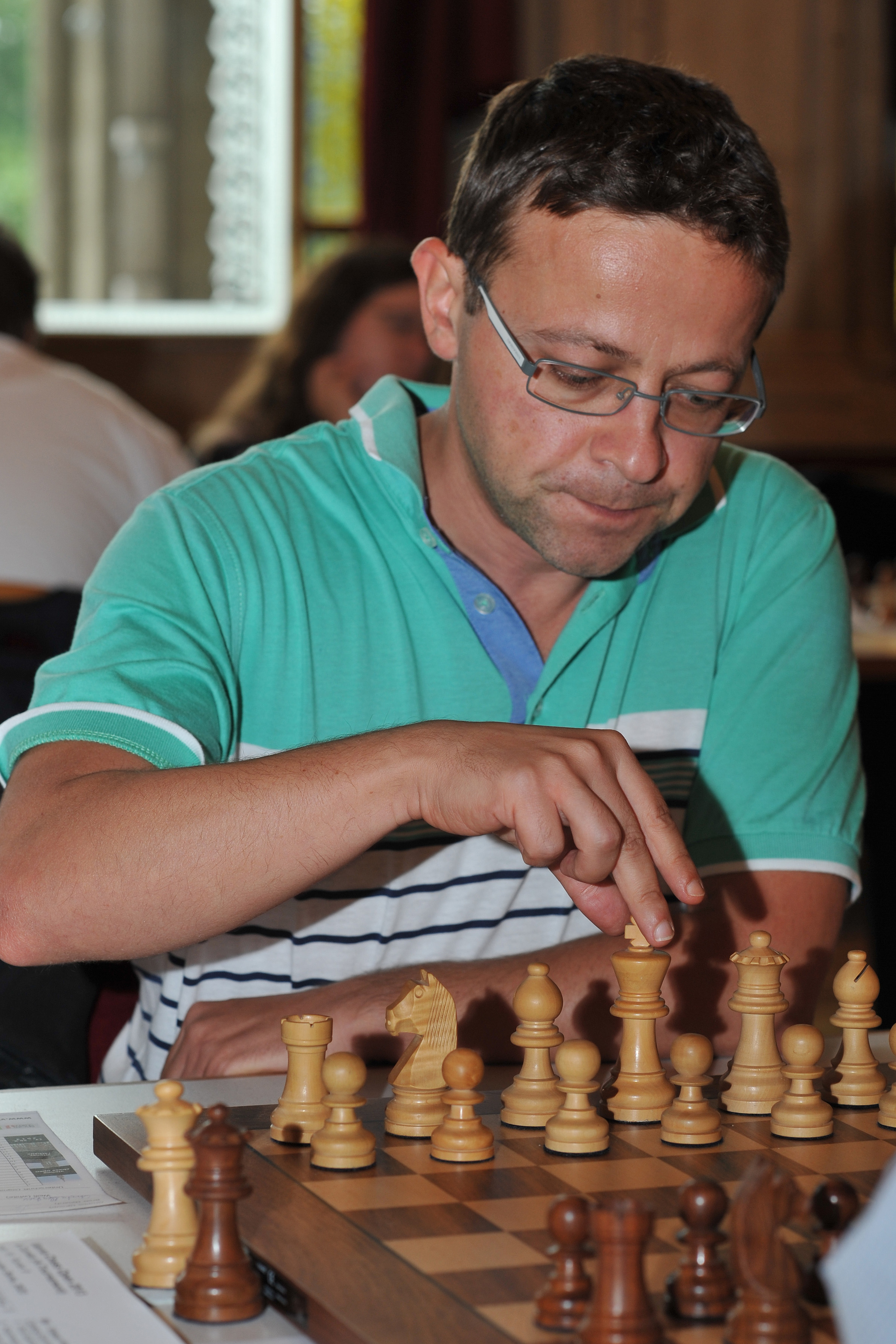
- Boris Chatalbashev in 2013

Personal information
- Born: 30 January 1974 (age 52) Pleven, Bulgaria

Chess career
- Country: Bulgaria (until 2018); Denmark (since 2018)
- Title: Grandmaster (1997)
- FIDE rating: 2470 (October 2026)
- Peak rating: 2613 (July 2010)

Boris Chatalbashev (Bulgarian: Борис Чаталбашев; born 30 January 1974) is a Bulgarian and Danish chess Grandmaster (GM) (1997), four-times Bulgarian Chess Championship winner (1991, 1998, 2007, 2010). He won the Danish Chess Championship in 2023 and 2024.

== Biography ==
In the 1990s and 2000s, Boris Chatalbashev was one of the leading Bulgaria chess players. He four times won Bulgarian Chess Championship: in 1991 (he became youngest champion in the history of Bulgarian chess), 1998, 2007, and 2010. Also he two times won Bulgarian Chess Championship silver medals: in 2004 and 2009. Boris Chatalbashev four times won Bulgarian Team Chess Championship with various chess clubs (2008, 2009, 2012, 2013).

He won or shared the 1st place in many international chess tournaments, include Albena (1992), Pavlikeni (1994), Chambéry (1996), Paris (1997), Saint-Affrique (1998), Cutro (1998, 2001), Porto San Giorgio (2000, 2003), Imperia (2001), Val Thorens (2001, 2004), Reggio Emilia (2001/02), Balatonlelle (2002, 2003), Agde (2002), La Roda (2004), Genoa (2005), Sunny Beach (2005, 2006) and Rijeka (2007).

Boris Chatalbashev played for Bulgaria in the Chess Olympiads:

- In 1996, at second reserve in the 32nd Chess Olympiad in Yerevan (+1, =2, -1).
- In 1998, at first reserve board in the 33rd Chess Olympiad in Elista (+3, =3, -2),
- In 2004, at first reserve board in the 36th Chess Olympiad in Calvià (+3, =2, -1).

Boris Chatalbashev played for Bulgaria in the European Team Chess Championships:

- In 2003, at third board in the 14th European Team Chess Championship in Plovdiv (+1, =3, -2),
- In 2007, at first reserve board in the 16th European Team Chess Championship in Heraklion (+0, =6, -1).

Boris Chatalbashev played for Bulgaria in the Men's Chess Balkaniads:

- In 1992, at sixth board in the 23rd Chess Balkaniad in Mangalia (+3, =0, -0) and won team silver and individual gold medal.

In 1995, he was awarded the FIDE International Master (IM) title and received the FIDE Grandmaster (GM) title two years later.

In December 2021 he won 20000 leva on the Bulgarian version of "Who Wants to Be a Millionaire".
