= Zdravko Milev =

Bulgarian chess player

Zdravko Milev Milev (Bulgarian: Здравко Милев) (October 25, 1929 – January 1, 1984) was a Bulgarian chess International Master.

He became an International Master in 1952 after becoming Bulgarian National Champion. He went on to win the national championship again in 1960 and 1961.
