= Alexander Tsvetkov =

Bulgarian chess player (1914–1990)

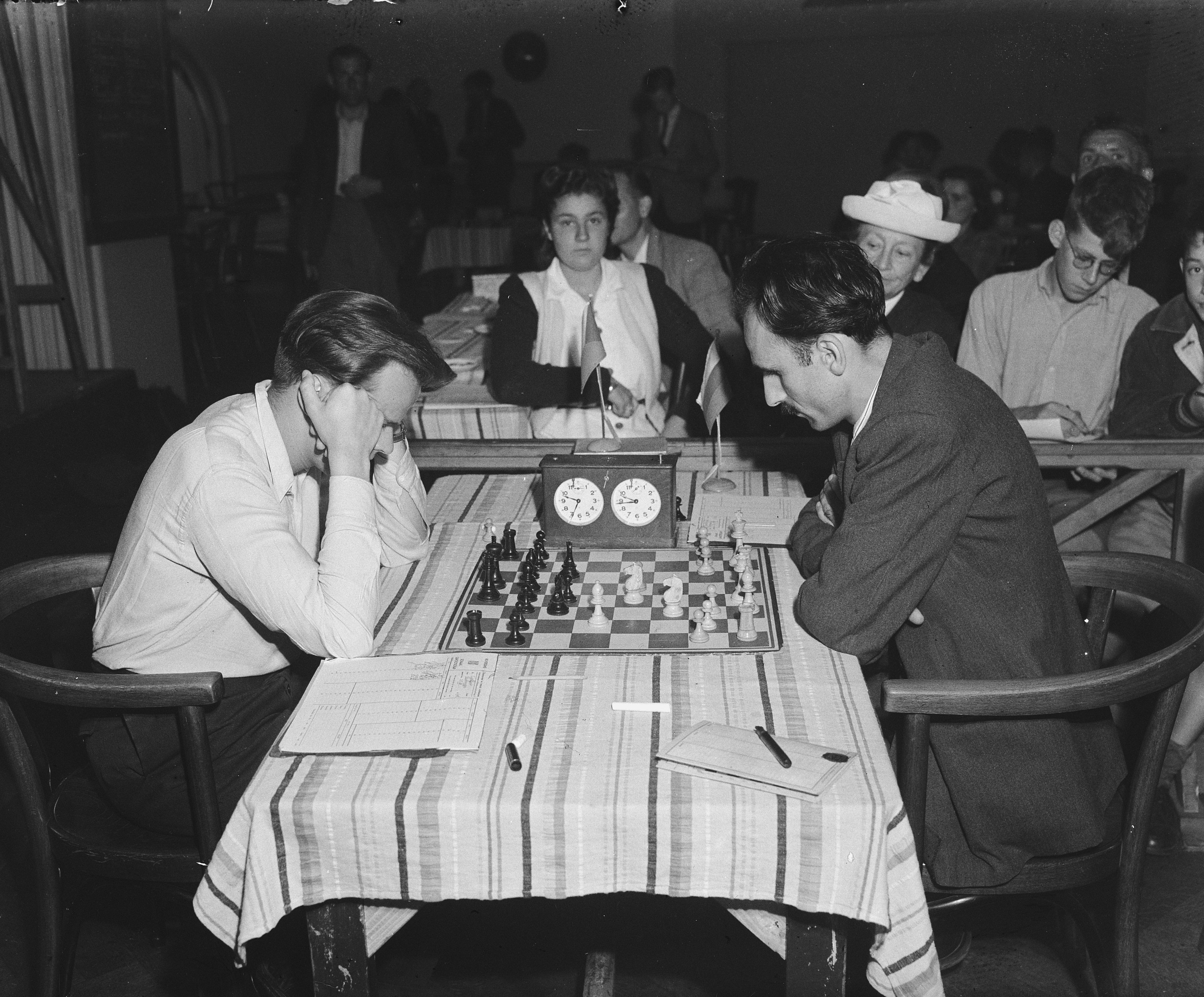
Alexander Tsvetkov vs. Luděk Pachman (Zonal, 1947)

Alexander (Alexandar) Kristov Tsvetkov (Cwetkow) (Bulgarian: Александър Христов Цветков) (7 October 1914 in Topolovgrad, Bulgaria – 29 May 1990) was a Bulgarian chess master.

In April 1936, he won a game against Alexander Alekhine at Alekhine's Simultaneous Exhibition in Sofia. He was Bulgarian Champion in 1938, 1940 (jointly), 1945, 1948 (jointly), 1950, and 1951.

Tsvetkov represented Bulgaria in Chess Olympiads.

- In 1936, at second board in 3rd unofficial Olympiad in Munich (+3 –13 =2);
- In 1939, at first board in the 8th Chess Olympiad in Buenos Aires (+7 –5 =4);
- In 1954, at fourth board in the 11th Chess Olympiad in Amsterdam (+2 –2 =7);
- In 1956, at first reserve board in the 12th Chess Olympiad in Moscow (+3 –1 =5).

In September 1942, he tied for 7–8th in Munich (Wertungsturnier – Qualification Tournament; Gösta Danielsson won) at Europameisterschaft (European Championship; Alekhine won).

After World War II, he played for Bulgaria in some friendly matches: BUL–CSR (1949), BUL–GDR (1953), BUL–RUS (1958).

In 1947, he took 16th in Moscow (1st Chigorin Memorial; Mikhail Botvinnik won). In 1947, he took 10th in Hilversum (zonal; Albéric O'Kelly de Galway won). In 1951, he tied for 13–14th in Mariánské Lázně (Marienbad, zonal; Luděk Pachman won). In 1964, he tied for 4–9th in Polanica Zdrój (Rubinstein Memorial).

Tsvetkov was awarded the International Master (IM) title in 1950. He was the first Bulgarian player to get the title.
