= Paunka Todorova =

Bulgarian chess player

Personal information
- Born: January 26, 1930 (age 96) Valchi Dol, Bulgaria

Chess career
- Country: Bulgaria

Paunka Todorova (Bulgarian: Паунка Тодорова; born 26 January 1930) is a Bulgarian chess player. She was a two-time winner of the Bulgarian Women's Chess Championship (1955, 1964).

== Biography ==
From the mid-1950s to the end of the 1960s, Paunka Todorova was one of the leading Bulgarian women's chess players. She won in Bulgarian Women's Chess Championships six medals: two gold (1955, 1964), silver (1970) and three bronze (1951, 1952, 1954). In 1958, Paunka Todorova won 3rd place in International Women's chess tournament in Bela Crkva. In 1959, she participated at Women's World Chess Championship Candidates Tournament in Plovdiv and ranked 14th place.

Paunka Todorova played for Bulgaria in the Women's Chess Olympiad:

- In 1963, at first reserve board in the 2nd Chess Olympiad (women) in Split (+1, =1, -2).

She stopped her chess player career in 1978.
