= Sarkis Bohosjan =

Bulgarian chess player

Personal information
- Born: 27 March 1941 (age 85) Plovdiv, Bulgaria

Chess career
- Country: Bulgaria
- Title: International Master (1978)
- Peak rating: 2365 (January 2000)

Sarkis Bohosjan (Bulgarian: Саркис Бохосян; born 27 March 1941) is a Bulgarian chess International Master (1978), Bulgarian Chess Championship winner (1972).

== Biography ==
Sarkis Bohosjan active chess player career was in the period from 1967 to 1981. He won the Bulgarian Chess Championship in 1972. In the same year Sarkis Bohosjan was included in the Bulgarian team for 20th Chess Olympiad in Skopje at second reserve board, but does not play any party. In 1972 Sarkis Bohosjan also participated in the European Zonal Chess tournament in Caorle (Italy), where he shared 7th-10th place. Sarkis Bohosjan won first place with the national team of railwaymen at the Team Chess Championship of the International Union of Railways (UIC) in Golden Sands. Sarkis Bohosjan played for Plovdiv chess club ШК Локомотив.

Sarkis Bohosjan played for Bulgaria in the European Team Chess Championship:

- In 1970, at first reserve board in the 4th European Team Chess Championship in Kapfenberg (+1, =1, -1).

Sarkis Bohosjan played for Bulgaria in the Men's Chess Balkaniad:

- In 1972, at sixth board in the 4th Men's Chess Balkaniad in Sofia (+2, =1, -0) and won team silver and individual gold medals.

In 1978, he was awarded the FIDE International Master (IM) title.
