= Venka Asenova =

Bulgarian chess player (1930–1986)

Personal information
- Born: 17 October 1930 Sofia, Bulgaria
- Died: 29 December 1986 (aged 56) Sofia, Bulgaria

Chess career
- Country: Bulgaria
- Title: Woman Grandmaster (1986)

Venka Asenova (Bulgarian: Венка Асенова; 17 October 1930 – 29 December 1986) was a Bulgarian chess player who held the title of Woman Grandmaster (WGM, 1986). She was a nine-time winner of the Bulgarian Women's Chess Championship (1953, 1956, 1960, 1961, 1962, 1963, 1965, 1966, 1969).

== Biography ==
From the 1950s to the 1970s, Venka Asenova was one of the leading Bulgarian women's chess players. She won Bulgarian Women's Chess Championship nine times: 1953, 1956, 1960, 1961, 1962, 1963, 1965, 1966 and 1969. The winner of many international chess tournaments, including the 2nd place in Sofia (1967), shared the 1st-2nd place in Piotrków Trybunalski (1969), shared 2nd place in Wijk aan Zee (1970) and Piotrków Trybunalski (1970). In 1967, she participated in Women's World Chess Championship Candidates Tournament in Subotica, where shared 14th-15th place.

Venka Asenova played for Bulgaria in the Women's Chess Olympiads:

- In 1957, at first board in the 1st Chess Olympiad (women) in Emmen (+5, =7, -2),
- In 1963, at first board in the 2nd Chess Olympiad (women) in Split (+6, =4, -2),
- In 1966, at first board in the 3rd Chess Olympiad (women) in Oberhausen (+8, =3, -2) and won the individual bronze medal,
- In 1969, at first board in the 4th Chess Olympiad (women) in Lublin (+5, =2, -4),
- In 1972, at second board in the 5th Chess Olympiad (women) in Skopje (+5, =6, -0),
- In 1974, at first reserve board in the 6th Chess Olympiad (women) in Medellín (+2, =2, -1) and won the team bronze medal,
- In 1978, at first reserve board in the 8th Chess Olympiad (women) in Buenos Aires (+0, =2, -3).

In 1965, Venka Asenova was awarded the FIDE Woman International Master (WIM) title, but in 1986 she received the honorary title of FIDE Woman Grandmaster (WGM).
