= Petar Genov =

Bulgarian chess grandmaster (born 1970)

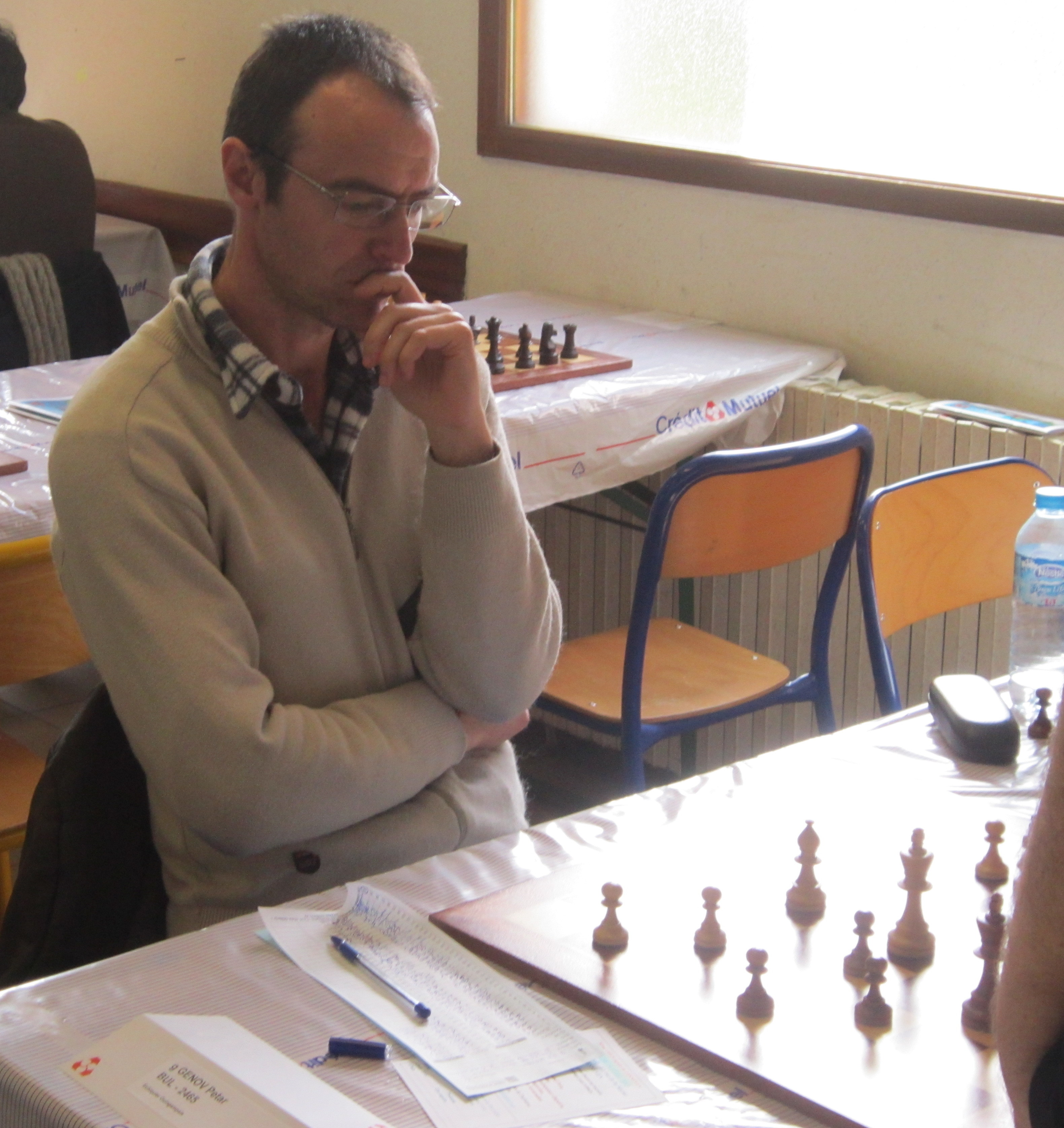

Personal information
- Born: 5 April 1970 (age 56)

Chess career
- Country: Bulgaria
- Title: Grandmaster (2002)
- FIDE rating: 2418 (July 2026)
- Peak rating: 2526 (July 2002)

Petar Genov (Bulgarian: Петър Генов; born 5 April 1970) is a Bulgarian chess grandmaster (2002).

He was taught how to play chess at the age of 7-8 by his father. He won the Bulgarian Chess Championship in 1993 and 1999 and played for Bulgaria in the 35th Chess Olympiad in Bled 2002. In the same year he came first at Herceg Novi. In 2004, tied for first with Vadim Malakhatko in the 3rd Condom Chess Open.

He is married to Woman International Master Lyubka Genova.
