= Rumiana Gocheva =

Bulgarian chess player

Personal information
- Born: Румяна Гочева; July 21, 1957 (age 68) Asenovgrad, Bulgaria

Chess career
- Country: Bulgaria
- Title: Woman International Master (1982)
- Peak rating: 2290 (July 1988)

Rumiana Hristova Bojadjieva-Gocheva (Bulgarian: Румяна Христова Бояджиева-Гочева) (born July 21, 1957) is a Bulgarian chess Woman International Master from 1981.

Rumiana Gocheva was six-time Bulgarian Women's Champion - 1980, 1982, 1984, 1987, 1989, 1991.

She has played for Bulgaria in five Chess Olympiads, La Valletta 1980 (Malta), Lucerne 1982 (Switzerland), Thessaloniki 1984 (Greece), Dubai 1986 (United Arab Emirates) and Novi Sad 1990 (Yugoslavia, today's Serbia).
