= Margarita Voyska =

Bulgarian chess player

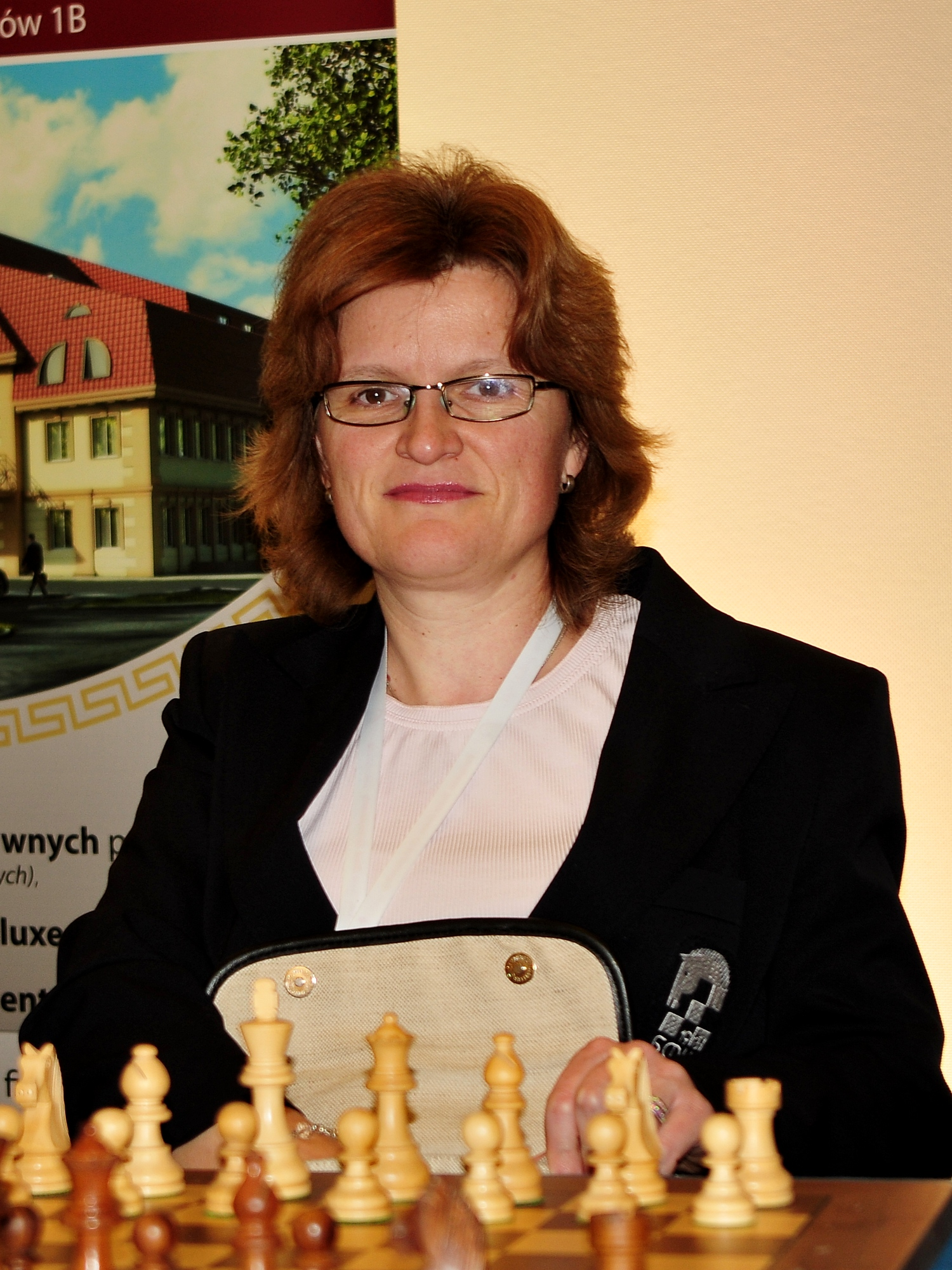

Personal information
- Born: April 3, 1963 (age 63) Sofia, Bulgaria

Chess career
- Country: Bulgaria
- Title: Woman Grandmaster (1985)
- Peak rating: 2390 (January 1995)

Margarita Voyska (Bulgarian: Маргарита Войска; born April 3, 1963, Sofia) is a Bulgarian chess player.

She has won the Women's Bulgarian Chess Championship 11 times.

She has competed for the Women's World Chess Championship several times, and has competed in the Women's Chess Olympiad in total 19 times between 1980-2016 which is the women's record in number of times one has participated in the Chess Olympiads. She was in the Bulgarian team that won the silver medal in 1984. She won the Women's European Senior Chess Championship in 2013.
