= Oleg Neikirch =

Bulgarian chess player

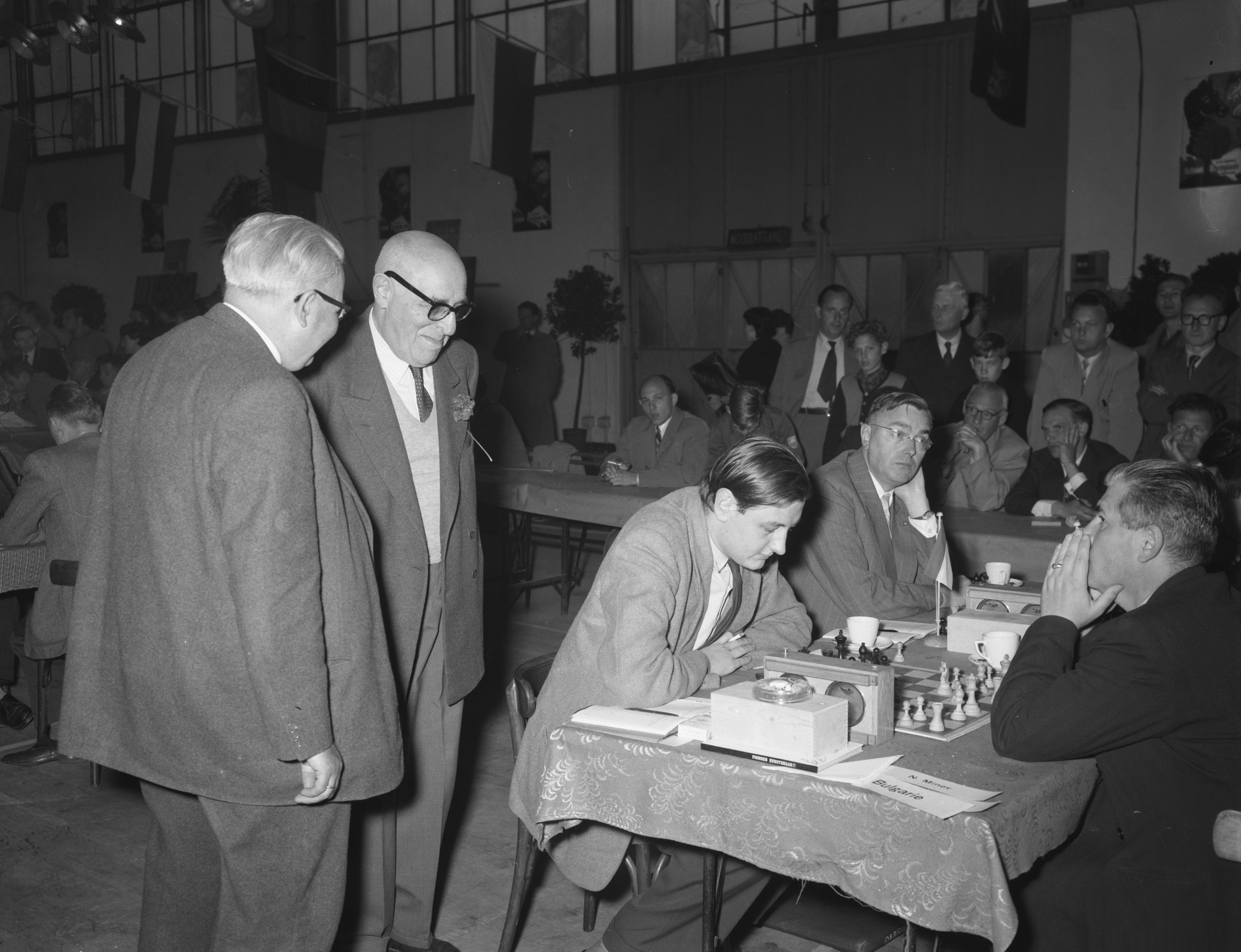
Chess Olympiad 1954: Neikirch (right) playing J. H. Donner

Oleg Nikolaev Neikirch (Neikirh, Nejkirch, Neykirch) (Bulgarian: Олег Николаев Нейкирх) (8 March 1914, Tbilisi, Georgia - 26 August 1985, Bulgaria) was a Bulgarian chess master.

He won seven times Bulgarian Chess Championship (in 1937, 1938, 1940 (jointly), 1943, 1948 (jointly), 1953 (jointly), and 1957).

He represented Bulgaria in four Chess Olympiads (1939, 1954, 1958, and 1960).

- In 1939, at second board in 8th Chess Olympiad in Buenos Aires (+6 –5 =4);
- In 1954, at second board in 11th Chess Olympiad in Amsterdam (+1 –2 =4);
- In 1958, at first board in 13th Chess Olympiad in Munich (+1 –6 =6);
- In 1960, at third board in 14th Chess Olympiad in Leipzig (+4 –4 =6).

He tied for 2nd-4th at Sofia 1957 (zonal; Miroslav Filip won), and took 15th at Portorož 1958 (Interzonal; Mikhail Tal won).

He was awarded the International Master (IM) title in 1957.
