= Peicho Peev =

Bulgarian chess player (1940–2007)

Personal information
- Born: 2 April 1940 Plovdiv, Bulgaria
- Died: 15 September 2007 (aged 67) Plovdiv, Bulgaria

Chess career
- Country: Bulgaria
- Title: International Master (1973)

Peicho Peev (Bulgarian: Пейчо Пеев; 2 April 1940 – 15 September 2007) was a Bulgarian chess International Master (1973). Bulgarian Chess Championship winner (1968) and Chess Olympiad team bronze medal winner (1968).

== Biography ==
In the 1960s and 1970s Peev was one of the leading Bulgarian chess players. He won the Bulgarian Chess Championship in 1968, and won the silver medal in this tournament in the 1971. Peev was winner of many international chess tournament awards. In 1973, he was awarded the FIDE International Master (IM) title.

Peev played for Bulgaria in the Chess Olympiads:

- In 1968, at second reserve board in the 18th Chess Olympiad in Lugano (+2, =2, -1) and won team bronze medal,
- In 1972, at first reserve board in the 20th Chess Olympiad in Skopje (+6, =4, -2).

Peev played for Bulgaria in the European Team Chess Championship:

- In 1970, at ninth board in the 4th European Team Chess Championship in Kapfenberg (+2, =2, -2),
- In 1977, at seventh board in the 6th European Team Chess Championship in Moscow (+1, =2, -3).

Peev played for Bulgaria in the World Student Team Chess Championship:

- In 1956, at first reserve board in the 3rd World Student Team Chess Championship in Uppsala (+3, =1, -1).

Peev played for Bulgaria in the Men's Chess Balkaniads:

- In 1971, at sixth board in the 3rd Men's Chess Balkaniad in Athens (+2, =2, -0) and won team silver and individual gold medals,
- In 1972, at fifth board in the 4th Men's Chess Balkaniad in Sofia (+3, =0, -1) and won team and individual silver medals,
- In 1973, at sixth board in the 5th Men's Chess Balkaniad in Poiana Brașov (+3, =1, -0) and won team and individual gold medals.

For many years Peev worked as a chess coach for children and young people in the native Plovdiv chess club ШК Локомотив.
