= Evgenij Ermenkov =

Bulgarian chess grandmaster (born 1949)

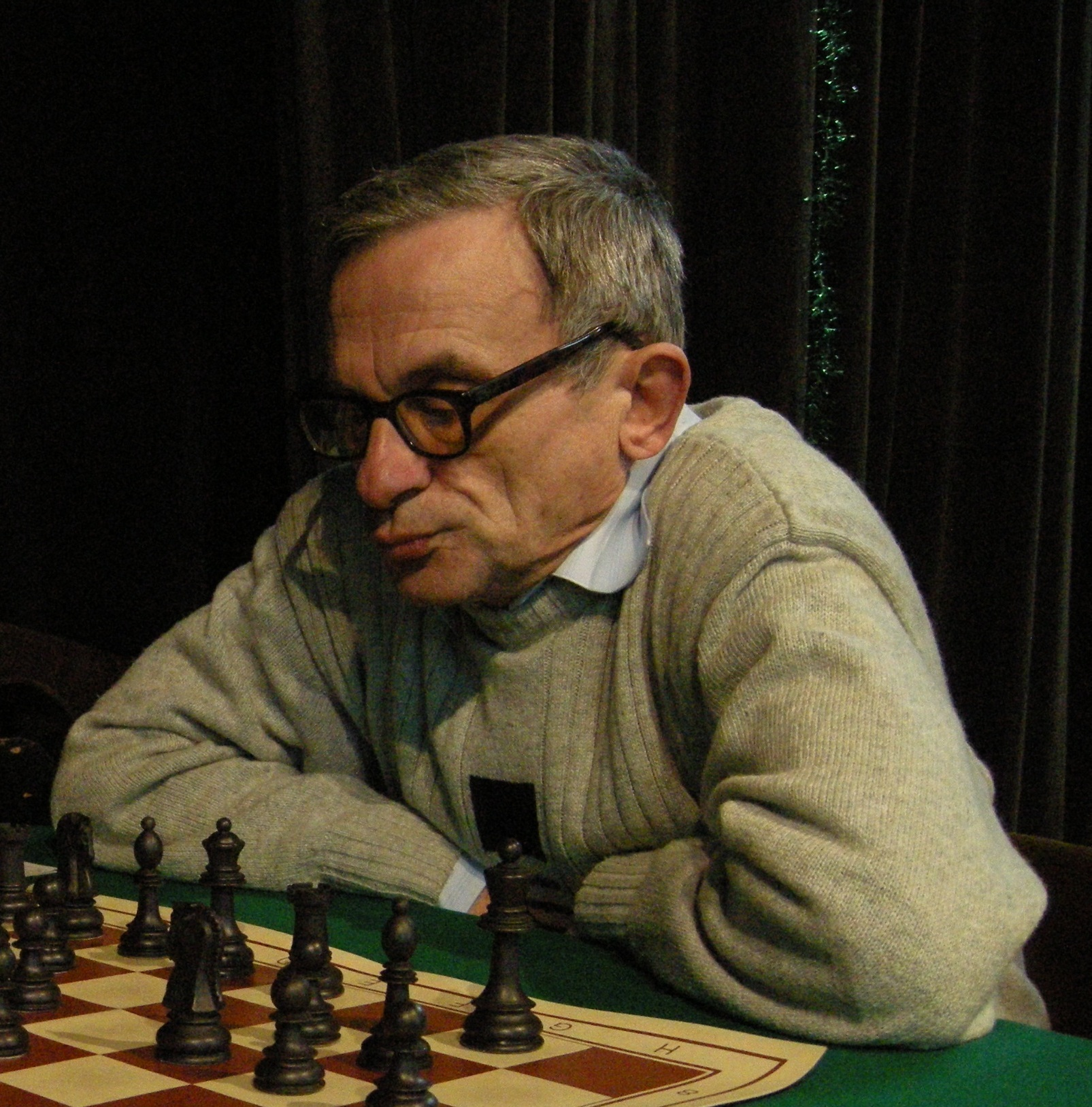
- Ermenkov in 2008

Personal information
- Native name: Евгени Петков Ерменков
- Born: 29 September 1949 (age 76) Sofia, Bulgaria

Chess career
- Country: Bulgaria; Palestine (2003–2010)
- Title: Grandmaster (1977)
- Peak rating: 2520 (January 1978)

Evgenij Petkov Ermenkov (Bulgarian: Евгени Петков Ерменков; born 29 September 1949) is a Bulgarian chess player. FIDE awarded him the titles International Master, in 1974, and Grandmaster in 1977. Ermenkov represented Palestine from October 2003 to December 2010.

Ermenkov won the Bulgarian championship in 1973, 1975 (after a play-off), 1976, 1979 (after a play-off) and 1984 (jointly). In international competition, he has had tournament victories, including Albena 1977 (and 1979), Plovdiv 1978 (and 1979), Varna 1986, Dieren 1990 (Open Dutch Championship), Beirut 2004 and Imperia 2005.

He has a long career in team chess, beginning at the World Student Olympiad of 1972, where he represented his country of birth. Graduating to the full Bulgarian men's team, he first played at the European Team Chess Championship in 1977 (Moscow) and won an individual bronze medal in 1983 (Plovdiv). At the Chess Olympiad, he represented Bulgaria from 1978 to 1992, taking individual bronze in 1990.

From 1992, there was a break from team chess which lasted twelve years, during which time he switched his place of residence and chess registration to Palestine. Playing for his adopted nation in the Olympiad from 2004 to 2008, he won the gold medal at Calvià 2004 for the best result on first board (87.5%, 10½/12) and at Turin 2006, the silver medal (85%, 8½/10, again on top board). But later, he returned to Bulgaria.
