= Milko Bobotsov =

Bulgarian chess grandmaster (1931–2000)

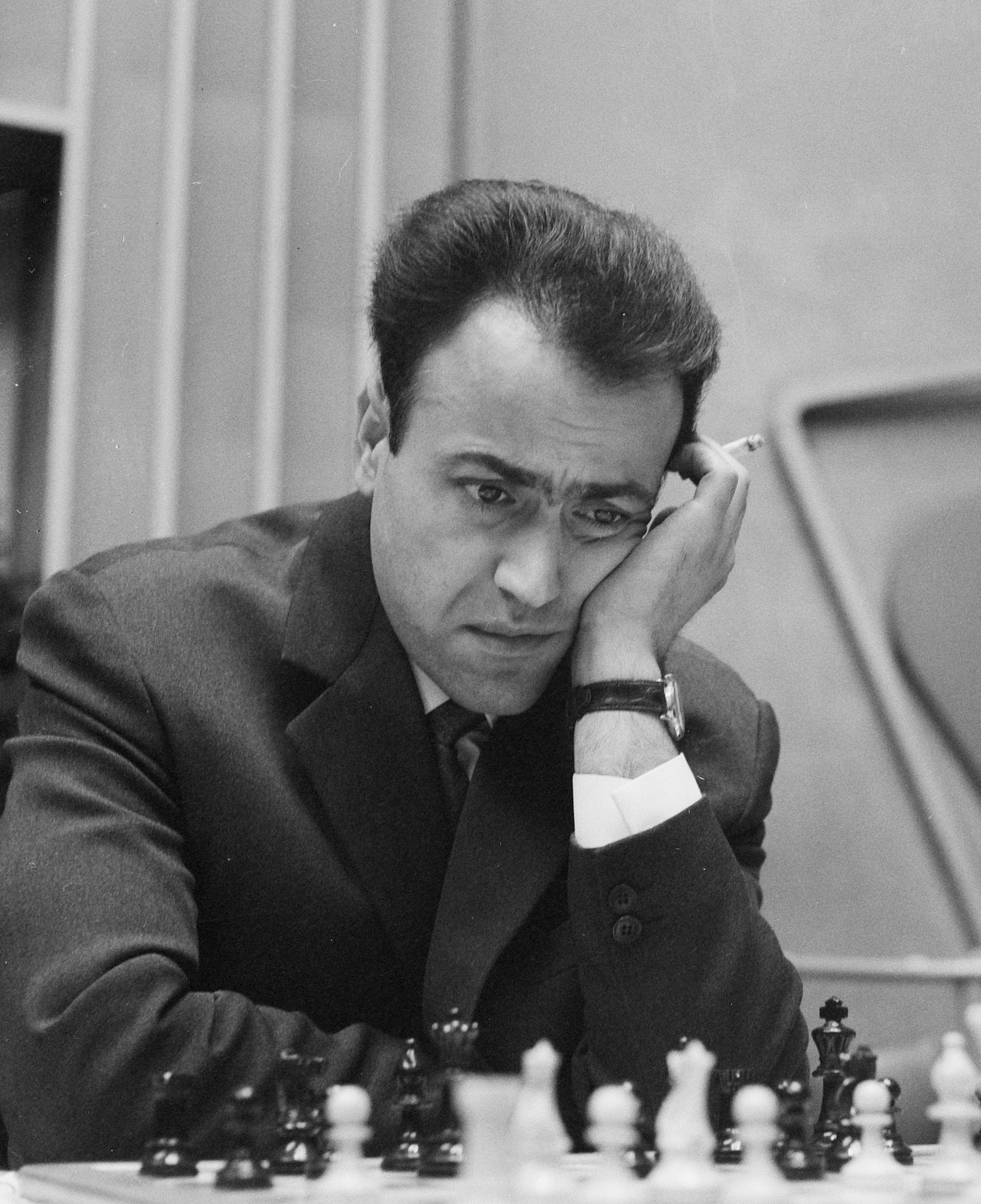
- Bobotsov in 1966

Personal information
- Born: September 30, 1931 Plovdiv, Bulgaria
- Died: April 3, 2000 (aged 68) Sofia, Bulgaria
- Spouse: Antonia Ivanova

Chess career
- Country: Bulgaria
- Title: Grandmaster (1961)
- Peak rating: 2485 (July 1971)
- Peak ranking: No. 96 (July 1971)

Milko Georgiev Bobotsov (Bulgarian: Милко Георгиев Бобоцов; 30 September 1931, in Plovdiv – 3 April 2000, in Sofia, Bulgaria) was the first Bulgarian to attain the chess title of Grandmaster, achieving this title in 1961. Prior to gaining the title he won the Bulgarian national championship in 1958. Probably his best result was equal second at the powerful Alekhine Memorial tournament in Moscow in 1967. Other successes included first or shared first places at Varna 1957, Pécs (Asztalos Memorial) 1964 and Sarajevo, Bosna 1971.

He was not a full-time chess player, working as an instructor of gymnastics for several years before suffering a near-fatal stroke in 1972 that severely curtailed his chess and other activities. However, after 18 years of inactivity, he participated in a tournament in Iran in 1991. He was married to the Woman Grandmaster Antonia Ivanova.

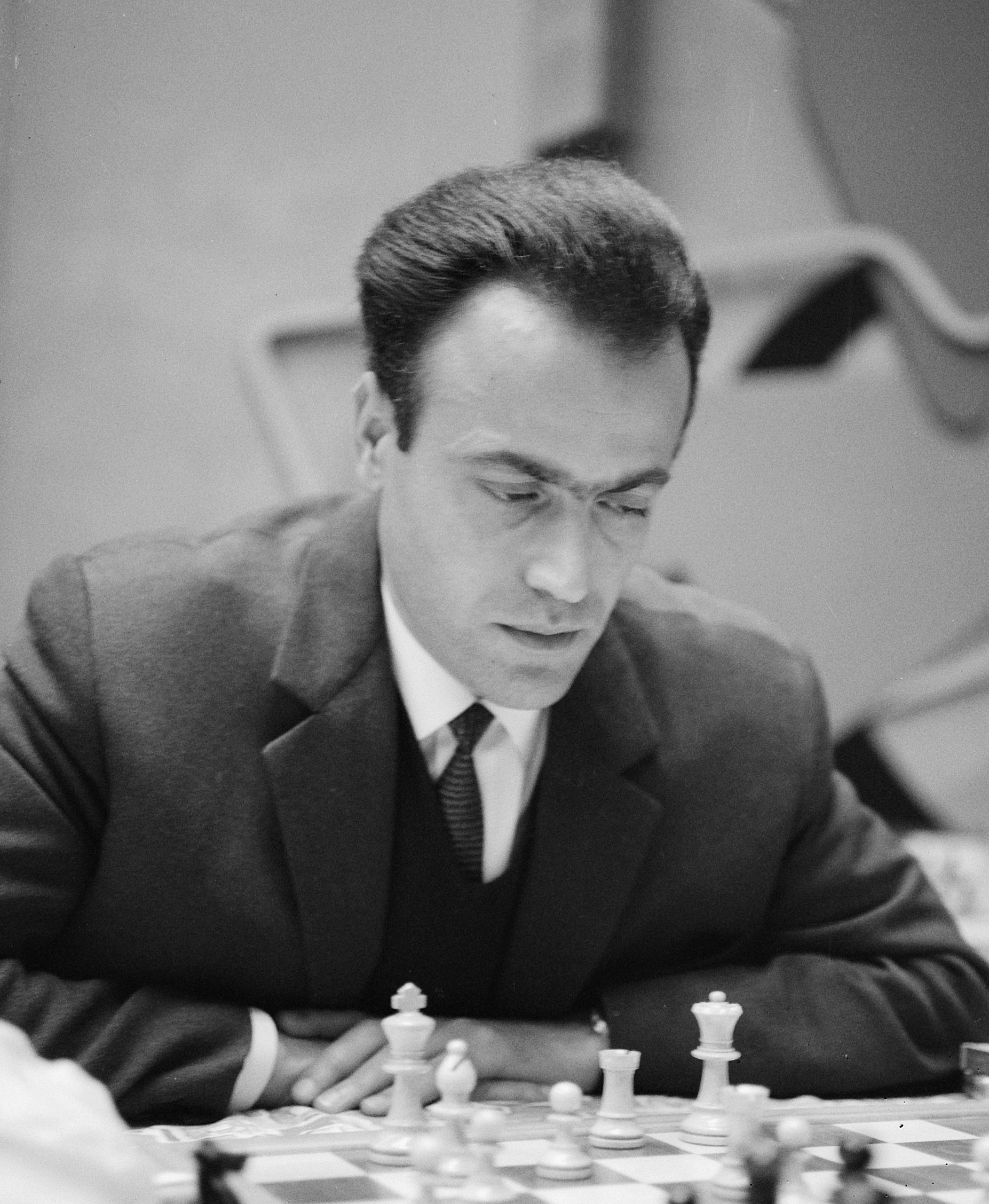
Milko Bobotsov in 1965
