= Nikola Padevsky =

Bulgarian chess grandmaster (1933–2023)

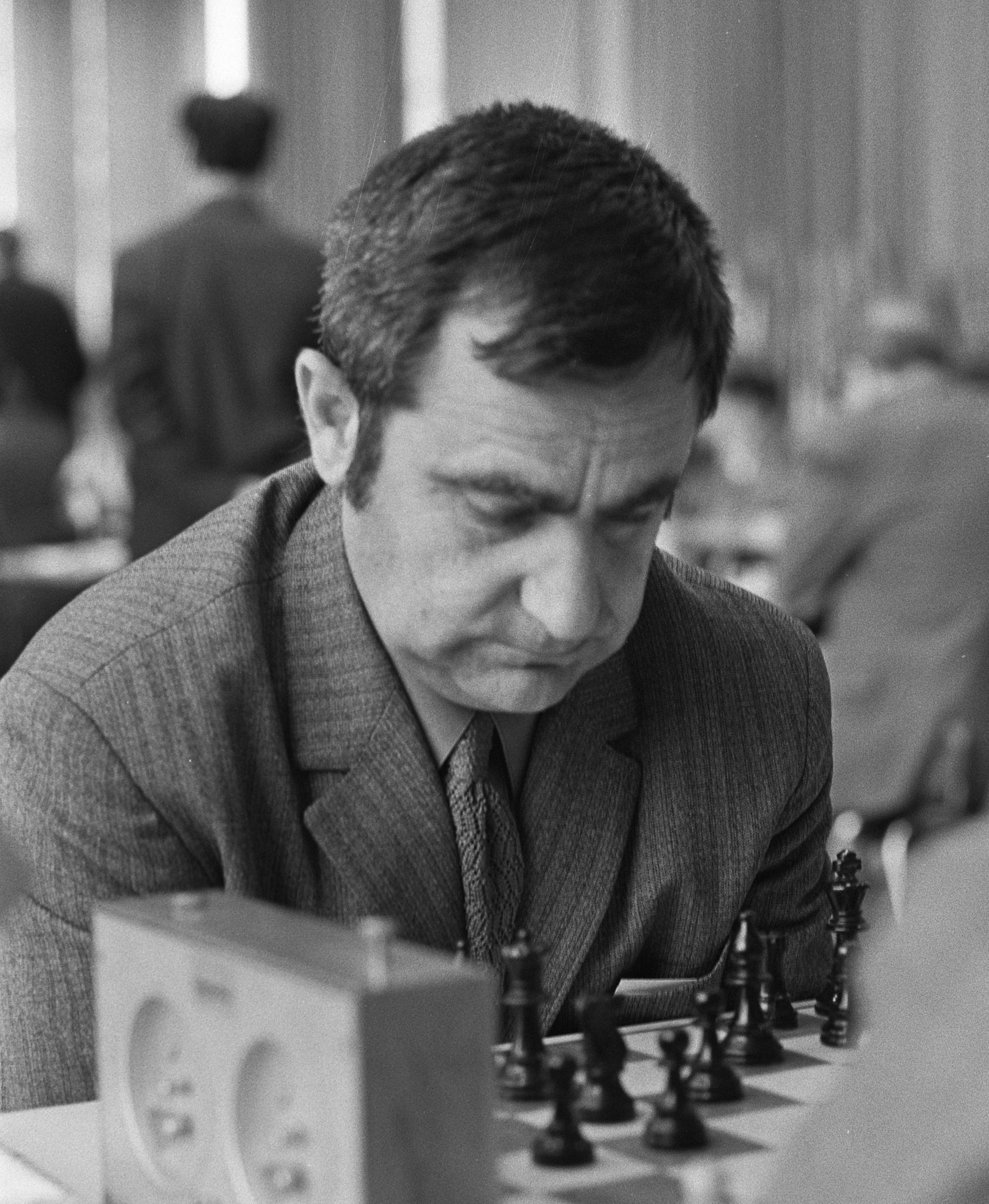
- Padevsky in 1972

Personal information
- Born: 29 May 1933 Plovdiv, Bulgaria
- Died: 17 December 2023 (aged 90)

Chess career
- Country: Bulgaria
- Title: Grandmaster (1964)
- Peak rating: 2490 (July 1973)

Nikola Bochev Padevsky (Bulgarian: Никола Бочев Пъдевски; 29 May 1933 – 17 December 2023) was a Bulgarian chess Grandmaster.

== Biography ==
Padevsky was born in Plovdiv, Bulgaria's second largest city. He became Bulgarian National Champion in 1954, going on to win it in 1955, 1962 and 1964 in a play off after which he gained the status of a grandmaster, after initially being awarded International Master in 1957.

Padevsky played in the World Student Team Championship six times (every year from 1954 through 1959). Playing first board in 1959 he helped Bulgaria win the team gold medal. He played on the Bulgarian team in eleven Chess Olympiads (every Olympiad from 1956 through 1978 except for 1976), playing first board in his first Olympiad appearance in 1956 and again in 1962 and 1964.

Padevsky won the Rubinstein Memorial in Polanica-Zdrój in 1963 at its inception, and shared first place at the international tournaments Varna 1960 and Varna 1975, and at Athens 1983 (Acropolis International).

Padevsky was also a corporate lawyer. He died on 17 December 2023, at the age of 90.
