= Duhm =

Duhm is a surname. Notable people with the surname include:

- Andreas Duhm (1883–1975), German–Swiss chess master
- Bernhard Duhm (1847–1928), German Lutheran theologian
- Dieter Duhm (born 1942), German sociologist, psychoanalyst, art historian and author
- Dietrich Duhm (1880–1954), German–Swiss chess master
- Hans Duhm (1878–1946), German–Swiss chess master
