= Gundula Heinatz =

Swiss chess player (born 1969)

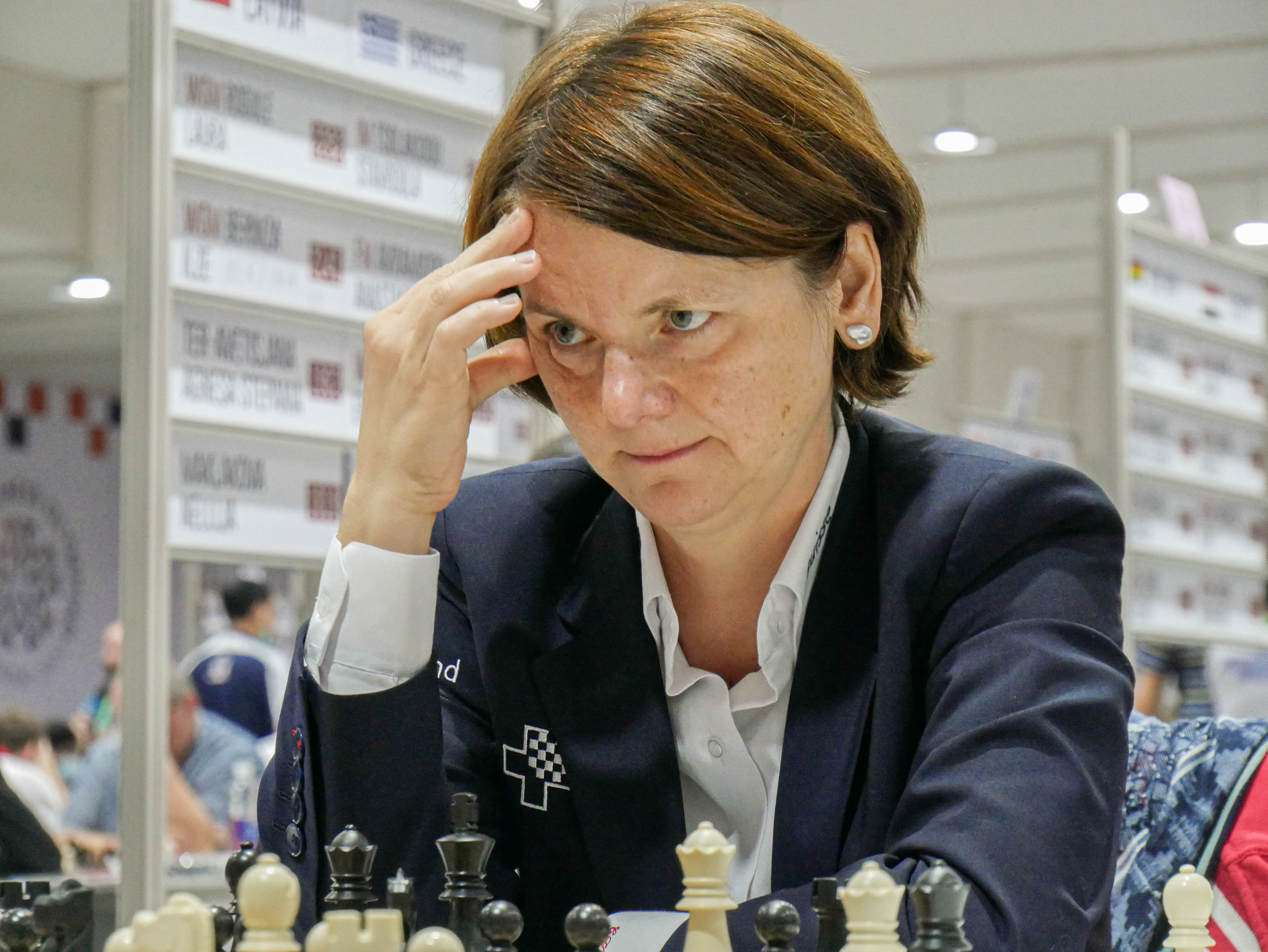
- Gundula Heinatz in 2022

Personal information
- Born: 12 May 1969 (age 57) Halle (Saale), East Germany

Chess career
- Country: Germany (until 2001); Switzerland (since 2001)
- Title: Woman International Master (1993)
- Peak rating: 2277 (July 2005)

Gundula Heinatz (née Nehse, born 12 May 1969) is a German and Switzerland (from 2001) chess Woman International Master (1993) who won East Germany Women's Chess Championship (1990) and two times Swiss Women's Chess Championship (2014, 2018).

== Life ==
Gundula Heinatz grew up as Gundula Nehse in East Germany. She learned to play chess from her father. The real training started at the BSG Chemie IW (Ilmenau) chess section. As Gundula Nehse, she went down in German chess history in 1990 in Bad Blankenburg as the last East Germany Women's Chess champion.

She moved her place of residence to Switzerland and works as a doctoral specialist for information technology at the company Schweizerische Mobiliar Versicherungsgesellschaft. The title of her dissertation at the Technical University of Dresden was Communication patterns and their application in the information landscape.

Her daughter Maria is also a powerful chess player. At the Chess Mitropa Cup in 2015, mother and daughter were part of the Swiss women's chess team.

== Chess career ==
As a girl, she won the U18 singles Youth Chess Championship in Ilmenau in the East Germany.

=== Tournaments (selection) ===
She played in the following East Germany Women's Chess Championships: 1987 in Glauchau (4th place), 1988 in Stralsund (5th place), 1989 in Zittau (4th place), 1990 in Bad Blankenburg (1st place).

Her women's chess tournaments followed in Dresden in 1990 (shared 2nd place behind Zoya Lelchuk), the Ingrid Larsen Memorial Tournament in Farum in 1991 (3rd place, Eliška Richtrová won), a women's chess tournament in Dresden in 1992 (shared 2nd place, Margarita Voyska won), the Farum Open 1993 (shared 3rd place, first was Eliška Richtrová).

At the German Women's Individual Championship in 1993 in Bad Mergentheim she finished 4th behind Marina Olbrich, Anke Koglin and Isabel Hund.

She participated in Women's World Chess Championship Zonal Tournaments in 1993 in Graz, in 1995 in Ptuj and in 1998 in Dresden.

After moving to Switzerland, she finished second behind Tatjana Lematschko at the Swiss Women's Chess Championship in 2002 in Leukerbad.

In 2014 and 2018, Heinatz won the Swiss Women's Chess Championships.

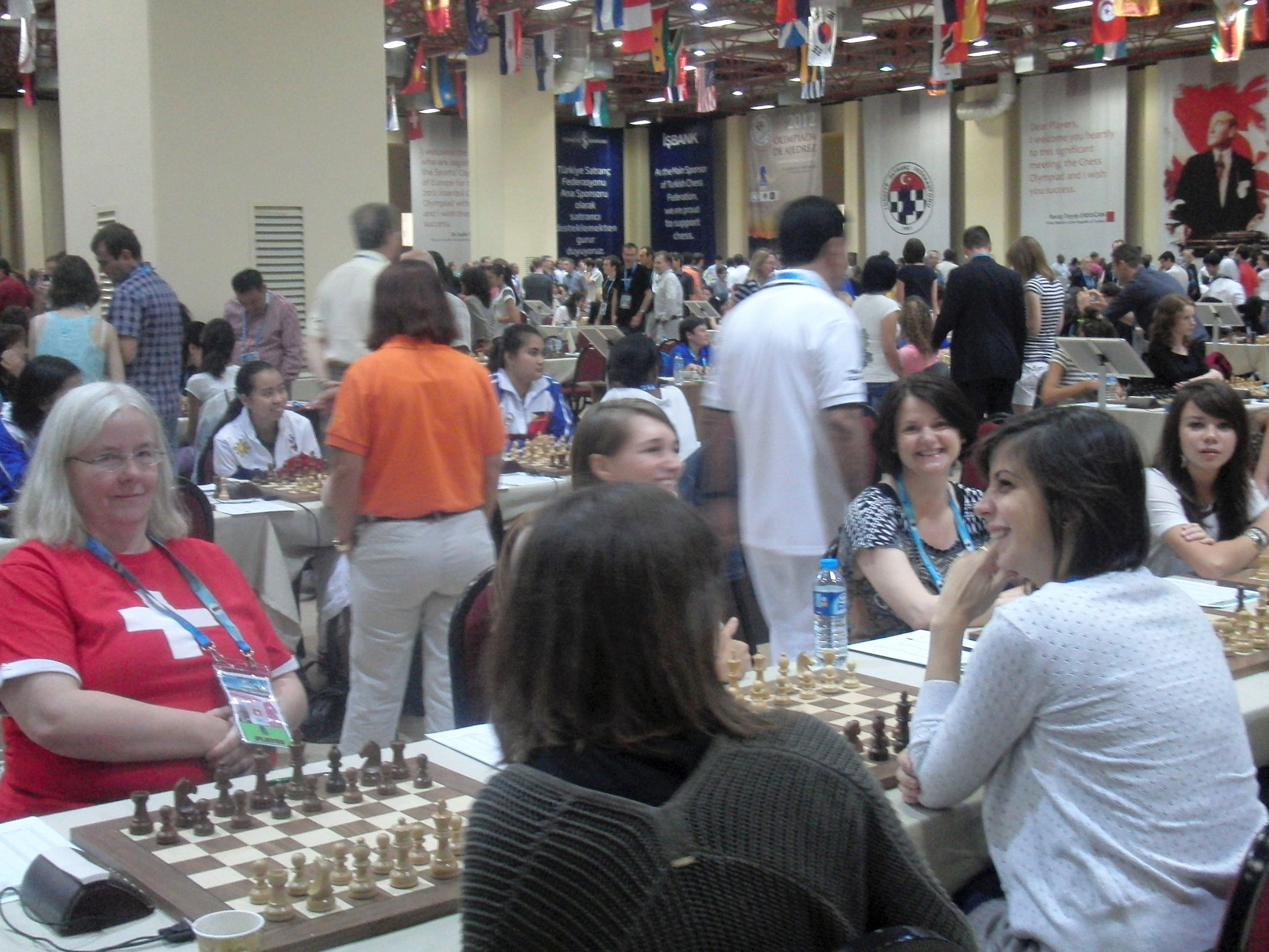
40th Chess Olympiad in Istanbul, 5th round: Switzerland (Barbara Hund, Monika Seps, Gundula Heinatz and Laura Stoeri) against Montenegro

=== National team ===
In 1992 Gundula Heinatz participated in the 30th Chess Olympiad in Manila with the German women's chess team.

With the Swiss women's team she played in all seven Chess Olympiads since the 35th Chess Olympiad from 2002 in Bled.

She took part in the European Women's Team Chess Championships in 1992 with Germany, as well as in 2007, in 2011 and in 2013 with Switzerland, where she achieved the second-best individual result on the third board in 2007.

=== Clubs ===
Gundula Heinatz played in the Chess Women's 1st Bundesliga from 1991 to 1999 for the Dresdner SC (until 1994 Post SV Dresden), with which she in 1995 won the championship, and from 2002 to 2013 and again since 2015 for the Karlsruher Schachfreunde, which she continued to belong to in the meantime after being relegated to the Chess Women's 2nd Bundesliga.

In Switzerland, her club is SK Trubschachen, with whom she plays in the National League A (Chess) in season 2014, in the Swiss Chess 1st Bundesliga she had an assignment at N. N. Bern.
