= Thürig =

Thürig is a Swiss surname. Notable people with the surname include:

- Andrea Thürig (born 1978), Swiss road cyclist
- Catherine Thürig (born 1958), Swiss chess master
- Karin Thürig (born 1972), Swiss racing cyclist and triathlete
