= Lena Georgescu =

Swiss chess player (born 1999)

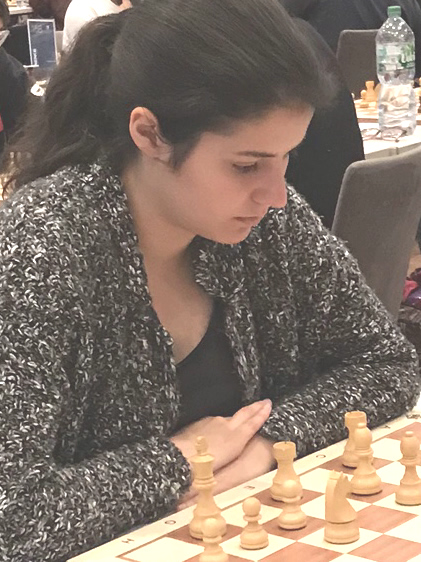
- Lena Georgescu in 2019

Personal information
- Born: 18 September 1999 (age 27) Bern, Switzerland

Chess career
- Country: Switzerland
- Title: FIDE Master (2023); Woman Grandmaster (2024)
- Peak rating: 2318 (June 2023)

Lena Georgescu (born 18 September 1999) is a Swiss chess player. She is a Woman Grandmaster (2024) and three time Swiss Women's Chess Championship winner (2017, 2021, 2022).

== Chess career ==
Georgescu grew up in Moosseedorf near Bern and initially learned to play chess from her father at the age of five. At the age of eight she became a member of the Bern Chess Club. From 2013 she was trained by Grandmaster Artur Yusupov and this year she also took part in her first international tournament, the European Youth Chess Championship in girls age group U14 in Budva.

In 2016 she achieved the title of FIDE Women's Master, becoming the youngest FIDE Master in Swiss chess history before Laura Stoeri.

She has competed many times in the individual finals of the Swiss Women's Chess Championships and won three gold medals in 2017, 2021, and 2022.

In Switzerland she is a member of the Winterthur Chess Society and the Bern Chess Club. With the Chess Club Lucerne, Georgescu won the Swiss Women's Team Chess Championship in 2018. From 2017 to 2019 she played with the SC Kirchberg in the Swiss Bundesliga. In the German Women's Chess League, Georgescu played for SG Augsburg 1873 in the 2016/17 season and has been active for Karlsruher Schachfreunde since the 2017/18 season.

Lena Georgescu played for Switzerland in the Women's Chess Olympiads:

- In 2016, at third board in the 42nd Chess Olympiad (women) in Baku (+4, =3, -2),
- In 2018, at first board in the 43rd Chess Olympiad (women) in Batumi (+5, =1, -4),
- In 2022, at first board in the 44th Chess Olympiad (women) in Chennai (+3, =4, -3).

Lena Georgescu played for Switzerland in the European Women's Team Chess Championships:

- In 2015, at reserve board in the 11th European Team Chess Championship (women) in Reykjavík (+3, =1, -3),
- In 2017, at first board in the 12th European Team Chess Championship (women) in Crete (+1, =5, -2),
- In 2019, at first board in the 13th European Team Chess Championship (women) in Batumi (+2, =5, -2),
- In 2021, at first board in the 14th European Team Chess Championship (women) in Čatež ob Savi (+2, =3, -3),
- In 2023, at second board in the 15th European Team Chess Championship (women) in Budva (+2, =4, -3).

Georgescu attended a sports support class at the Gymnasium Neufeld in Bern. She is studying computer science with minors in mathematics, business informatics and economics at the University of Bern.
