= Zurich 1934 chess tournament =

Zurich 1934 was an international chess tournament held in Zurich from 14 to 29 July 1934 to commemorate the 125th anniversary of Schachgesellschaft Zürich (the Zurich Chess Society). Alexander Alekhine won, followed by Max Euwe and Salo Flohr tied for second-third. The tournament also served as the 1934 Swiss Championship, won by Hans Johner as the highest-ranking Swiss player.

== The tournament field ==
The tournament pitted seven Swiss players against nine internationals, including six of the world's leading players. The major omissions were José Raúl Capablanca (Cuba) and Samuel Reshevsky (United States). There were no Soviet players either, and they would not return to international competition until the next year. This type of international tournament in which one third to one half of players were from the host country was first used at Moscow 1925, and later at Moscow 1935 and Kemeri 1937.

The tournament field featured the world champion Alexander Alekhine (France), former world champion Emanuel Lasker (Germany), two-time championship challenger Efim Bogoljubov (Germany), future champion Max Euwe (Netherlands), and championship contender Salo Flohr (Czechoslovakia). Alekhine won with 13/15 points, his only loss being to Euwe who finished tied for second with Flohr at 12. Alekhine again demonstrated his superiority over his contemporaries, although his winning margin of 1 point was much narrower than at Bled 1931 (5½ points) or San Remo 1930 (3½ points).

About a month before the tournament began, Euwe had accepted Alekhine's terms for a championship match to be held in the autumn of the next year. Euwe would win that 1935 World Championship match, becoming the fifth world chess champion. The Czech master Flohr was considered a worthy championship challenger for many years in the 1930s, but the Great Depression and German occupation of Czechoslovakia made it impossible for Flohr to arrange a match. Flohr was leading after 11 rounds, but Alekhine caught up in round 12 when they each had 10 points, a half point ahead of Euwe and a full point ahead of Bogoljubov. Alekhine took the lead in round 13 with a win over Gideon Ståhlberg (Sweden) while Flohr drew with Bogoljubov.

One month earlier Bogoljubov had lost the 1934 World Championship match, his second attempt to challenge Alekhine. At Zurich he finished fourth at 11½, a half point behind Euwe and Flohr. Lasker was returning to competition for the first time since Moscow 1925—a nine-year layoff. Lasker started strong, beginning the tournament with a fine win playing black against Euwe in round 1. After 7 rounds Lasker was tied for the lead with Flohr at 5½ points. At age 65 and being out of practice, Lasker was at a disadvantage in a long tournament and lost in rounds 8, 10 and 12 to Bogoljubov, Nimzowitsch, and Alekhine to finish at a very creditable fifth with 10 points. This was the only time that Alekhine, Bogoljubov and Nimzowitsch beat Lasker. Earlier in round 5 Ståhlberg and Lasker played for the first time in their careers, with the younger Swede victorious.

Aron Nimzowitsch (Denmark) was formerly a world championship contender, but in 1934 his health was declining and he would die just a year later at age 48. He finished tied for sixth with Ossip Bernstein (France). Bernstein was a tournament veteran who would be in the inaugural group of grandmasters when FIDE created the title in 1950. According to a well-known anecdote, after missing a winning line against Fritz Gygli (Switzerland), Bernstein is reported to have asked "Am I not a chess idiot?" When Lasker agreed, Bernstein had the former world champion sign an affidavit attesting to that fact.

== Selected games ==
Euwe–Lasker, Zürich 14 July 1934

Position: d8 black rook, e8 black knight, g8 black king, a7 black pawn, f7 black pawn, c6 black pawn, e6 black pawn, g6 black pawn, e5 white pawn, g5 black queen, a4 white pawn, c4 white bishop, e4 white knight, b3 white pawn, f3 white rook, c2 black knight, d2 black rook, f2 white pawn, g2 white pawn, e1 white rook, f1 white queen, g1 white king

Lasker wins with 35...Qxe5!
Euwe–Alekhine, Zürich 18 July 1934

Position: c8 black knight, d8 black queen, g8 black king, c7 black rook, g7 black pawn, h7 black pawn, a6 black pawn, c6 black pawn, e6 black rook, f6 black pawn, a5 white pawn, b5 black pawn, c5 white queen, e5 white knight, b4 white pawn, d4 white pawn, e4 white rook, f2 white pawn, g2 white pawn, h2 white pawn, c1 white rook, g1 white king

Euwe wins a pawn 31. Nf7!
Alekhine–Lasker, Zürich 25 July 1934

Position: d8 black rook, f8 black rook, g8 black knight, h8 black king, a7 black pawn, b7 black pawn, d7 black knight, h7 black pawn, b6 black queen, c6 black pawn, f6 black pawn, g6 black pawn, f5 white knight, g5 white queen, e4 white pawn, b3 white bishop, d3 white rook, a2 white pawn, b2 white pawn, f2 white pawn, g2 white pawn, h2 white pawn, c1 white rook, g1 white king

Alekhine wins at once with 26. Qxg6!

In round 1 Lasker defended a Queen's Gambit Declined against Euwe. After 35. Ng3-e4 (see diagram) Euwe's knight forked Lasker's queen and rook. Lasker turned the tables by trading his queen for a rook, knight and pawn, winning with 35...Qxe5! 36. Nf6+ Qxf6 37. Rxf6 Nxf6 38. Rc1 Ne4 39. Be2 Nd4 40. Bf3 Nxf2 41. Qc4 Nd3 42. Rf1 Ne5 43. Qb4 Nexf3+ 44. gxf3 Ne2+ 45. Kh2 Nf4+ 46. Kh1 R2d4 47. Qe7 Kg7 48. Qc7 R8d5 49. Re1 Rg5 50. Qxc6 Rd8 0–1.

Euwe was again on the white side of a Queen's Gambit Declined in round 5 against Alekhine. Euwe won a pawn and the game with 31. Nf7!. After 31...Kxf7 32. Qh5+ Ke7 33. Rxe6+ Kxe6 34. Re1+ Kd6 35. Qc5+ Kd7 36. Qf5+ Black will be mated. Instead Alekhine gave up a pawn with 31...Qe8 32. Rxe6 Qxe6 33. Nd8 Qe4 34. Nxc6 but was forced to resign on his 53rd move.

In round 12 Alekhine defeated Lasker for the only time in yet another Queen's Gambit Declined. After 25. Nd6-f5+ Kg7-h8 (see diagram), Alekhine forced Lasker to resign at once with 26. Qxg6! as Black has no defense against the threat of Qg7# (26...hxg6 27. Rh3+ Nh6 28. Rxh6#).

== Crosstable ==
Zürich 1934
	Player	01	02	03	04	05	06	07	08	09	10	11	12	13	14	15	16	Score
1	Alexander Alekhine (France)		0	½	½	1	1	1	1	1	1	1	1	1	1	1	1	13
2	Max Euwe (Netherlands)	1		½	1	0	½	1	½	1	1	1	1	½	1	1	1	12
3	Salo Flohr (Czechoslovakia)	½	½		½	½	½	½	1	1	1	1	1	1	1	1	1	12
4	Efim Bogoljubov (Germany)	½	0	½		1	½	½	½	1	1	1	1	1	1	1	1	11½
5	Emanuel Lasker (Germany)	0	1	½	0		0	1	0	½	1	1	1	1	1	1	1	10
6	Aron Nimzowitsch (Denmark)	0	½	½	½	1		½	½	0	0	1	1	½	1	1	1	9
7	Ossip Bernstein (France)	0	0	½	½	0	½		1	½	½	½	1	1	1	1	1	9
8	Gideon Ståhlberg (Sweden)	0	½	0	½	1	½	0		½	1	0	1	1	½	1	½	8
9	Hans Johner (Switzerland)	0	0	0	0	½	1	½	½		0	1	1	1	1	½	½	7½
10	Walter Henneberger (Switzerland)	0	0	0	0	0	1	½	0	1		0	0	1	0	1	1	5½
11	Fritz Gygli (Switzerland)	0	0	0	0	0	0	½	1	0	1		½	0	½	½	1	5
12	Stefano Rosselli del Turco (Italy)	0	0	0	0	0	0	0	0	0	1	½		½	1	1	½	4½
13	Henri Grob (Switzerland)	0	½	0	0	0	½	0	0	0	0	1	½		0	½	1	4
14	Hans Müller (Switzerland)	0	0	0	0	0	0	0	½	0	1	½	0	1		0	1	4
15	Oskar Naegeli (Switzerland)	0	0	0	0	0	0	0	0	½	0	½	0	½	1		½	3
16	Hermann Joss (Switzerland)	0	0	0	0	0	0	0	½	½	0	0	½	0	0	½		2

== See also ==
- Zurich 1953 chess tournament
- Zurich Chess Challenge
