= Erwin Voellmy =

Swiss chess player

Dr. Erwin Voellmy

Erwin Voellmy (9 September 1886, Herzogenbuchsee – 15 January 1951, Basel) was a Swiss chess master.

Voellmy, a mathematics teacher by profession, edited the chess column in Basler Nachrichten for 40 years, and was an author of several chess books.

He was Swiss Champion three times; in 1911 (jointly), 1920 and 1922. Voellmy represented Switzerland at:

- the 1st unofficial Chess Olympiad at Paris 1924 (+6 –2 =5),
- the 2nd Chess Olympiad at The Hague 1928 (+5 –2 =4),
- the 3rd unofficial Chess Olympiad at Munich 1936 (+5 –7 =5).

He won team bronze medal at Paris 1924.

He shared 1st with Alexander Alekhine and Oskar Naegeli at Bern 1932 (Qudrangular).
