= Kaenel =

Kaenel is a surname. Notable people with the surname include:

- Gilbert Kaenel (1949–2020), Swiss archaeologist
- Hansjürg Kaenel (born 1952), Swiss chess master
- Jack Kaenel (born 1965), retired American jockey
