= Artur Popławski =

Polish chess player

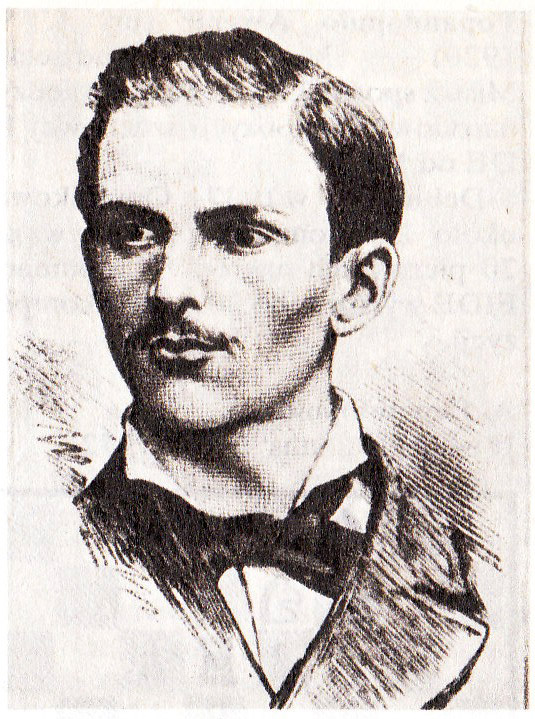

Artur Popławski (1860, in Warsaw – 1918, in Warsaw) was a Polish chess master.

He started his studies at Imperial University of Warsaw (with a Russian language) in 1879, and moved to ETH Zurich (Eidgenössische Technische Hochschule Zürich) in 1884.

In 1883/84, he took second place, behind Józef Żabiński, in the Warsaw City Chess Championship, scoring 19/22. In Switzerland, Poplawski twice shared first place with Max Pestalozzi in the Swiss Chess Championship, at Zürich in 1889 and at Winterthur in 1890.

He returned to Warsaw in the early 1890s and worked as an engineer.
