= Walter Henneberger =

Swiss chess player

Walter Henneberger (19 May 1883, Ennenda – 15 January 1969, Zurich) was a Swiss chess master.

He was Swiss Champion in 1904, 1906 (jointly), 1911 (jointly), and 1912. He took 16th at The Hague 1928 (World Amateur Chess Championship, Max Euwe won). took 6th at Winterthur 1931 (SUI-ch, Aron Nimzowitsch won – off contest).

He shared 9th at Bern 1932 (Alexander Alekhine won), took 10th at Zürich 1934 (Alekhine won), took 11th at Bad Liebwerda 1934 (Salo Flohr won), and tied for 5-8th at Lucerne 1950 (SUI-ch, Hans Johner won).

He played for Switzerland in friendly matches against Yugoslavia (1949), Belgium (1950), and West Germany (1952).
