= Myrta Ludwig =

Swiss chess player

Personal information
- Born: 1928 Zürich, Switzerland
- Died: 18 November 2003

Chess career
- Country: Switzerland

Myrta Ludwig (1928 - 18 November 2003) was a Swiss chess player who three times won the Swiss Women's Chess Championship (1969, 1977, 1978).

== Biography ==
Ludwig learned to play chess from her father. Her first chess club was the Schachclub Oerlikon, which she did not join until the age of 28. Myrta Ludwig won the Swiss Women's Chess Championships in 1969 in Lucerne, in 1977 in Muttenz and in 1978 in St. Moritz.

Ludwig played for Switzerland in the Women's Chess Olympiad:

- In 1976, at first reserve board in the 7th Chess Olympiad (women) in Haifa (+3, =1, -2).

Ludwig died in 2003 after a long illness. Her husband also played chess. Her daughter, Silvia Faust-Ludwig, is also a chess player.
