= Vanda Bilinski =

Swiss chess player (born 1944)

Personal information
- Born: 27 January 1944 (age 82)

Chess career
- Country: Switzerland

Vanda Bilinski (known as Veprek-Bilinski from 1975 from 1982, born 27 January 1944) is a Swiss chess player who won the Swiss Women's Chess Championship (1981). Women's Chess Olympiad individual bronze medalist (1976).

== Biography ==
From the mid-1970s to the mid-1980s Vanda Bilinski was one of the leading Swiss women's chess players. She won the Swiss Women's Chess Championship in 1981.

Vanda Bilinski played for Switzerland in the Women's Chess Olympiads:

- In 1976, at second board in the 7th Chess Olympiad (women) in Haifa (+6, =3, -1) and won individual bronze medal,
- In 1980, at first board in the 9th Chess Olympiad (women) in Valletta (+4, =5, -3),
- In 1982, at first board in the 10th Chess Olympiad (women) in Lucerne (+3, =3, -4),
- In 1984, at third board in the 26th Chess Olympiad (women) in Thessaloniki (+0, =3, -4).
