= Jean-Luc Costa =

Swiss chess player (born 1965)

Personal information
- Born: 25 January 1965 (age 61)

Chess career
- Country: Switzerland
- Title: International Master (1991)
- Peak rating: 2450 (July 1992)

Jean-Luc Costa (born 25 January 1965) is a Swiss chess player, International Master (1991), two time Swiss Chess Championship winner (1991, 1993).

== Chess career ==
In the mid-1990s, Jean-Luc Costa was one of the strongest Swiss chess players. In the individual finals of the Swiss Chess Championships, he won gold medals twice (1991, 1993).

Jean-Luc Costa played for Switzerland in the Chess Olympiad:

- In 1992, at first reserve board in the 30th Chess Olympiad in Manila (+5, =3, -2).

Jean-Luc Costa played for Switzerland in the World Team Chess Championship:

- In 1993, at reserve board in the 3rd World Team Chess Championship in Lucerne (+0, =2, -4).

Jean-Luc Costa played for Switzerland in the European Team Chess Championship:

- In 1992, at third board in the 10th European Team Chess Championship in Debrecen (+0, =0, -5).

Jean-Luc Costa played for Switzerland in the World Youth U26 Team Chess Championship:

- In 1991, at second board in the 8th World Youth U26 Team Chess Championship in Maringá (+4, =2, -2).

Jean-Luc Costa played for Switzerland in the Men's Chess Mitropa Cup:

- In 1990, at third board in the 13th Chess Mitropa Cup in Leibnitz (+4, =1, -1) and won individual gold medal,
- In 1991, at first board in the 14th Chess Mitropa Cup in Brno (+2, =3, -1),
- In 1995, at fourth board in the 16th Chess Mitropa Cup in Bükfürdő (+4, =1, -4).

In 1991, he was awarded the FIDE International Master (IM) title.
