= André Lombard =

Swiss chess player (1950–2025)

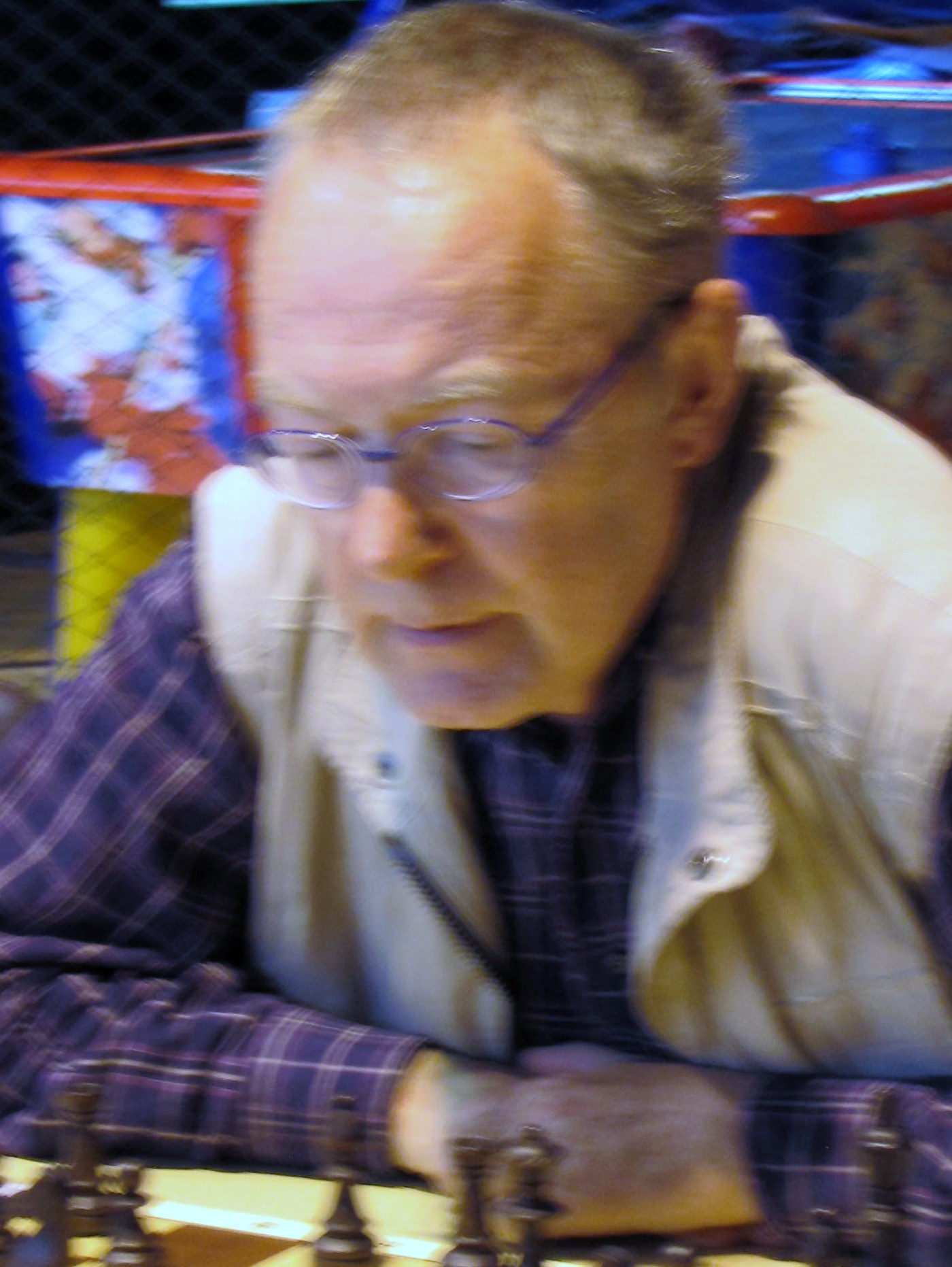
- Lombard in 2013

Personal information
- Born: 19 September 1950 Bern, Switzerland
- Died: October 2025 (aged 75)

Chess career
- Country: Switzerland
- Title: International Master (1976)
- Peak rating: 2420 (January 1976)

André Lombard (19 September 1950 – October 2025) was a Swiss chess player. Lombard won the Swiss Chess Championship five times: 1969, 1970, 1973, 1974, and 1977. He also played on the Swiss team in all five Chess Olympiads from 1970 to 1978. Lombard received the International Master title in 1976. He died in October 2025, at the age of 75.
