= Beat Züger =

Swiss chess player (1961–2023)

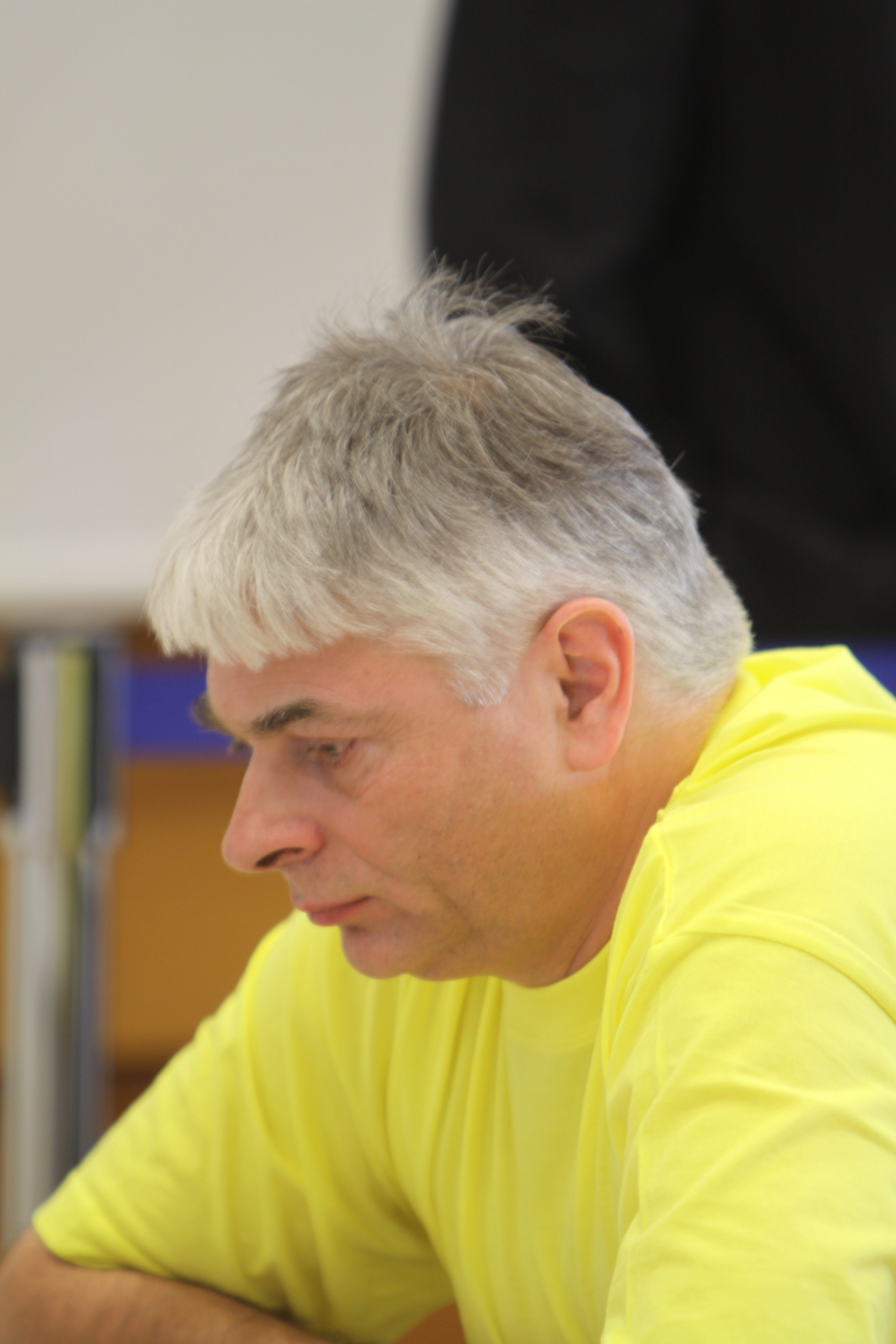
- Beat Züger in 2009

Personal information
- Born: 3 June 1961 Lachen, Switzerland
- Died: 4 July 2023 (aged 62) Lachen, Switzerland

Chess career
- Country: Switzerland
- Title: International Master (1984)
- Peak rating: 2480 (January 1995)

Beat Züger (3 June 1961 – 4 July 2023) was a Swiss chess player, International Master (1984), Swiss Chess Championship winner (1989).

== Chess career ==
Beat Züger was the only chess player to win all Swiss national chess titles: Junior Championship, Individual Championship, Team Championship, Team Cup and Coupe Suisse. Together with Claude Landenbergue he was coach of the Swiss junior national team.

In 1978, he became Swiss chess junior champion and won the Coupe Suisse. In 1980, he shared 1st place in Master Open Tournament in Biel Chess Festival. In 1983, he won a young masters tournament in Zug. In 1987, he won the Crédit Suisse World Mixed Tournament in Biel. He won the Swiss Chess Championship in Biel in 1989.

In 1984, he was awarded the FIDE International Master (IM) title. He achieved Grandmaster norms in 1995 at the Credis Grandmaster Tournament in Horgen, in 1997 in the Swiss team championship and in 2009 at the European Individual Chess Championship in Budva. However, he could not be awarded the Grandmaster title because he had not achieved the required Elo rating of at least 2500.

Beat Züger played for Switzerland in the Chess Olympiads:

- In 1980, at first reserve board in the 24th Chess Olympiad in La Valletta (+4, =6, -1),
- In 1982, at first reserve board in the 25th Chess Olympiad in Lucerne (+1, =3, -1),
- In 1984, at second board in the 26th Chess Olympiad in Thessaloniki (+1, =3, -2),
- In 1986, at second board in the 27th Chess Olympiad in Dubai (+1, =5, -3),
- In 1988, at third board in the 28th Chess Olympiad in Thessaloniki (+3, =4, -3),
- In 1992, at third board in the 30th Chess Olympiad in Manila (+5, =2, -3),
- In 1994, at fourth reserve board in the 31st Chess Olympiad in Moscow (+1, =5, -2),
- In 1996, at second board in the 32nd Chess Olympiad in Yerevan (+3, =3, -3),
- In 1998, at first reserve board in the 33rd Chess Olympiad in Elista (+1, =2, -2),
- In 2006, at second reserve board in the 37th Chess Olympiad in Turin (+0, =3, -2).

Beat Züger played for Switzerland in the World Team Chess Championship:

- In 1989, at third board in the 2nd World Team Chess Championship in Lucerne (+0, =2, -3).

Beat Züger played for Switzerland in the European Team Chess Championships:

- In 1989, at fourth board in the 9th European Team Chess Championship in Haifa (+0, =5, -2),
- In 1992, at first reserve board in the 10th European Team Chess Championship in Debrecen (+2, =3, -3),
- In 1997, at fourth board in the 11th European Team Chess Championship in Pula (+0, =4, -1).

Beat Züger played for Switzerland in the World Youth U26 Team Chess Championships:

- In 1983, at third board in the 4th World Youth U26 Team Chess Championship in Chicago (+4, =5, -0),
- In 1985, at second board in the 5th World Youth U26 Team Chess Championship in Mendoza (+5, =3, -2).

Beat Züger played for Switzerland in the Men's Chess Mitropa Cup (1981–1982, 1984–1993, 1998, 2000, 2003, 2005, 2007, 2011–2013) and won team silver (1985) and three bronze (1981, 1988, 1993) medals.

He had a chess column in the Tages-Anzeiger.

Beat Züger died in July 2023 after a long illness at the age of 62.
