= Heinz Wirthensohn =

Swiss chess player (born 1951)

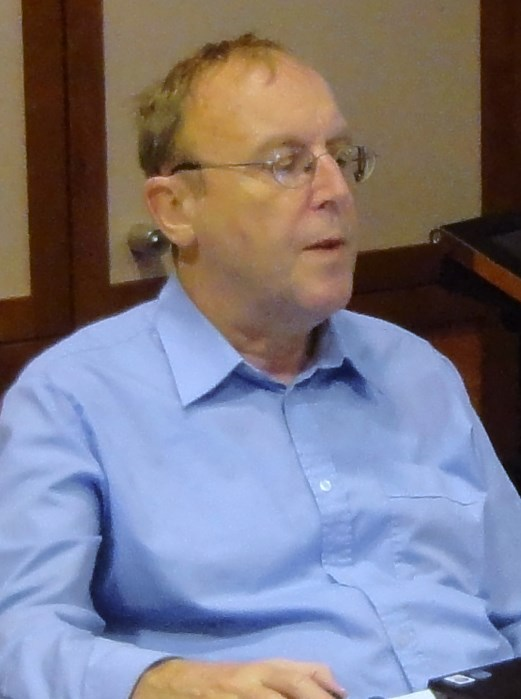
- Heinz Wirthensohn in 2014

Personal information
- Born: 4 May 1951 (age 75) Basel, Switzerland

Chess career
- Country: Switzerland
- Title: International Master (1977)
- Peak rating: 2460 (January 1991)

Heinz Wirthensohn (born 4 May 1951), is a Swiss chess International Master (1977), three-times Swiss Chess Championship winner (1979, 1981, 1992), European Team Chess Championship individual silver medal winner (1973).

== Biography ==
From the mid-1970s until the mid-1990s Heinz Wirthensohn was one of the leading Swiss chess players. He took part in Swiss Chess Championship finals many times and won gold medals in 1979, 1981 and 1992.

He achieved several successes in international chess tournaments, including 1st place in Bad Meinberg (1975), 2nd place in Biel Chess Festival main tournament (1979, behind winner Viktor Korchnoi) and 2nd place in Altensteig (1990, behind winner Alexander Chernin). He participated in World Chess Championships Zonal tournaments three times - Caorle (1972), Vratsa (1975) and Graz (1993).

Heinz Wirthensohn played for Switzerland in the Chess Olympiads:

- In 1972, at first reserve board in the 20th Chess Olympiad in Skopje (+7, =3, -7),
- In 1974, at fourth board in the 21st Chess Olympiad in Nice (+5, =5, -6),
- In 1976, at third board in the 22nd Chess Olympiad in Haifa (+4, =4, -2),
- In 1978, at fourth board in the 23rd Chess Olympiad in Buenos Aires (+3, =6, -0),
- In 1980, at second board in the 24th Chess Olympiad in La Valletta (+2, =7, -0),
- In 1982, at third board in the 25th Chess Olympiad in Lucerne (+3, =5, -3),
- In 1986, at first board in the 27th Chess Olympiad in Dubai (+4, =4, -3),
- In 1988, at second reserve board in the 28th Chess Olympiad in Thessaloniki (+5, =2, -3),
- In 1990, at third board in the 29th Chess Olympiad in Novi Sad (+3, =6, -0),
- In 1996, at first reserve board in the 32nd Chess Olympiad in Yerevan (+3, =2, -3).

Heinz Wirthensohn played for Switzerland in the World Team Chess Championship:

- In 1985, at third board in the 1st World Team Chess Championship in Lucerne (+1, =4, -2).

Heinz Wirthensohn played for Switzerland in the European Team Chess Championships:

- In 1973, at seventh board in the 5th European Team Chess Championship in Bath (+2, =3, -0) and won individual silver medal,
- In 1989, at fifth board in the 9th European Team Chess Championship in Haifa (+3, =4, -1).

Also Heinz Wirthensohn twelve times played for Switzerland in the Men's Chess Mitropa Cup (1976-1977, 1980-1981, 1985-1988, 1991-1993, 1997-1998, 2006) and won 3 silver (1976, 1977, 1985) and 3 bronze (1981, 1988, 1993) medals in team competition, and gold medal (1985) in individual competition. Heinz Wirthensohn three times played for Switzerland in the Clare Benedict Chess Cups (1974-1979) and won bronze medal (1974) in team competition.

In 1977, Heinz Wirthensohn was awarded the FIDE International Master (IM) title.
