= Anna Näpfer =

Swiss chess player

Personal information
- Born: 3 September 1913
- Died: 1 December 2007 (aged 94)

Chess career
- Country: Switzerland

Anna Näpfer (3 September 1913 – 1 December 2007) was a Swiss chess player who nine times won the Swiss Women's Chess Championship (1953, 1955, 1956, 1958, 1959, 1960, 1967, 1970, 1976).

== Biography ==
From the 1950s to the 1970s Anna Näpfer was one of the leading Swiss women's chess players. Between 1953 and 1976, she won nine times won the Swiss Women's Chess Championship and it is an all-time record. In 1960, in Vrnjačka Banja Anna Näpfer participated in FIDE Women's World Chess Championship West European Zonal Tournament.

Anna Näpfer played for Switzerland in the Women's Chess Olympiads:

- In 1972, at first board in the 5th Chess Olympiad (women) in Skopje (+4, =2, -3),
- In 1976, at first board in the 7th Chess Olympiad (women) in Haifa (+0, =3, -4).
