= Florian Jenni =

Swiss chess grandmaster (born 1980)

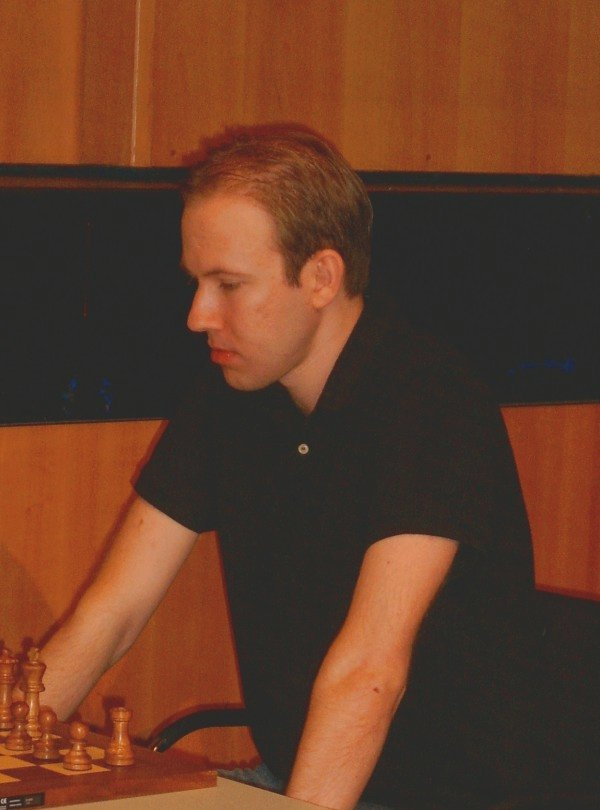

Personal information
- Born: March 24, 1980 (age 46) Lieli, Switzerland

Chess career
- Country: Switzerland
- Title: Grandmaster (2002)
- FIDE rating: 2463 (July 2026)
- Peak rating: 2550 (April 2008)

Florian Jenni (born 24 March 1980 in Lieli) is a Swiss chess grandmaster.

When he was five years old, he was taught to play chess by his mother and later on by his father. He was awarded the title of Grandmaster in 2003. On the March 2010 FIDE rating list his Elo rating is 2520.

Jenni, who studied economics and plays the piano in his free time, won tournaments in Lenk (2002), the Swiss Championship in Silvaplana (2003), and Winterthur (2005).

He is also a member of the Swiss National Team.
