= Claude Baumann =

Swiss chess player (born 1953)

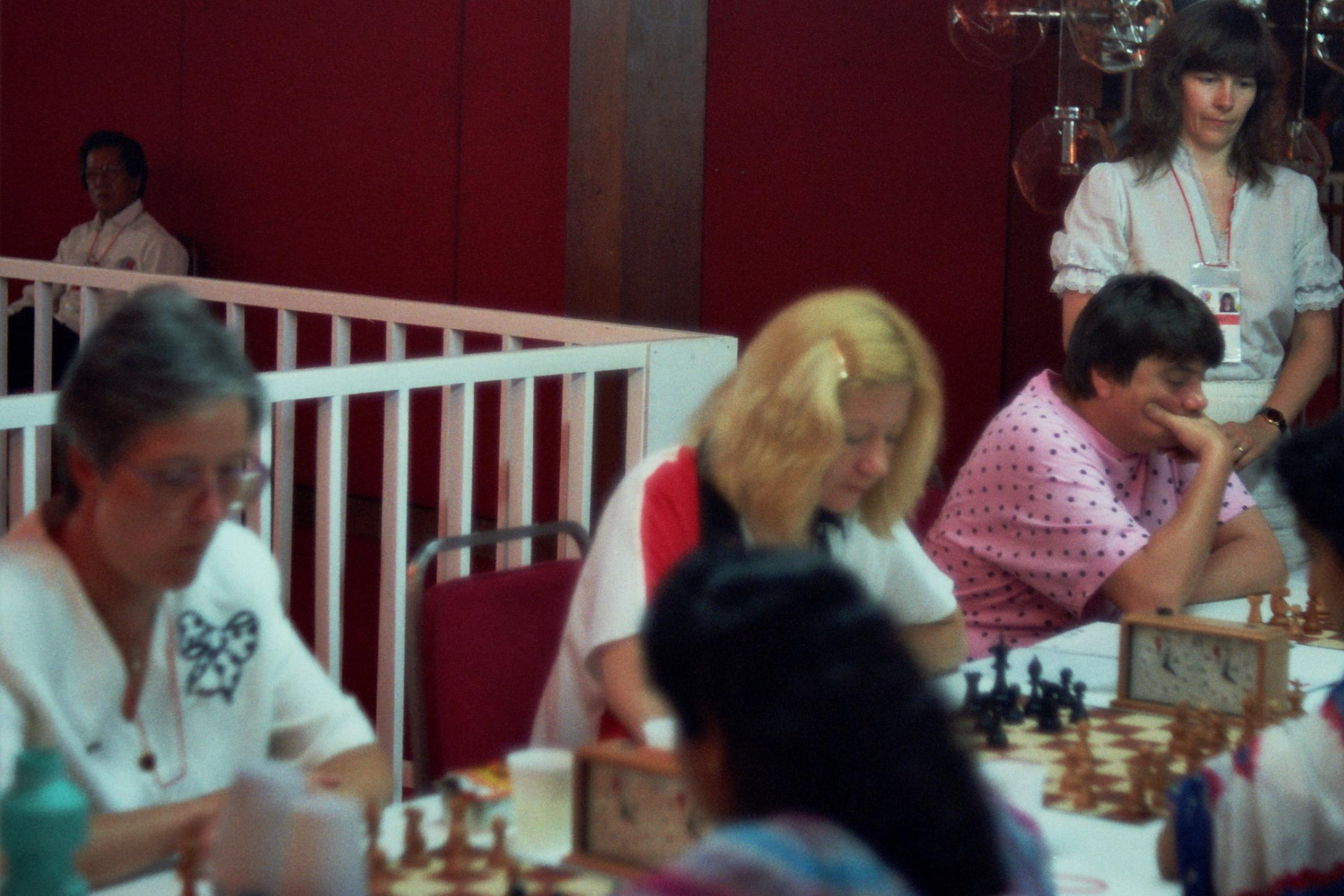
- Claude Baumann (in the center) in 1992 Women's Chess Olympiad

Personal information
- Born: 4 April 1953 (age 73)

Chess career
- Country: Switzerland
- Title: Woman FIDE Master (1990)
- Peak rating: 2085 (January 1991)

Claude Baumann (born 4 April 1953) is a Swiss chess player, Woman FIDE Master (1990), four time Swiss Women's Chess Championship winner (1982, 1987, 1988, 1991).

== Chess career ==
From the beginning of the 1980s to the beginning of the 1990s, Claude Baumann was one of the best Swiss female chess players. She has competed many times in the individual finals of the Swiss Women's Chess Championships and won gold medals four times (1982, 1987, 1988, 1991).

Claude Baumann four times participated in Women's World Chess Championship Zonal tournaments:

- in 1985, in Bad Lauterberg and has taken 9th place;
- in 1989, in Haifa and shared 5th - 6th place;
- in 1991, in Graz and has taken 9th place;
- in 1993, in Graz and shared 7th - 8th place;

Claude Baumann played for Switzerland in the Women's Chess Olympiads:

- In 1982, at third board in the 10th Chess Olympiad (women) in Lucerne (+3, =4, -3),
- In 1984, at second board in the 26th Chess Olympiad (women) in Thessaloniki (+4, =2, -6),
- In 1986, at third board in the 27th Chess Olympiad (women) in Dubai (+4, =2, -4),
- In 1988, at second board in the 28th Chess Olympiad (women) in Thessaloniki (+4, =3, -5),
- In 1990, at second board in the 29th Chess Olympiad (women) in Novi Sad (+3, =5, -3),
- In 1992, at third board in the 30th Chess Olympiad (women) in Manila (+2, =4, -5).

Claude Baumann played for Switzerland in the European Women's Team Chess Championship:

- In 1992, at first reserve board in the 1st European Team Chess Championship (women) in Debrecen (+0, =2, -0).
