= Sebastian Bogner =

German-Swiss chess grandmaster (born 1991)

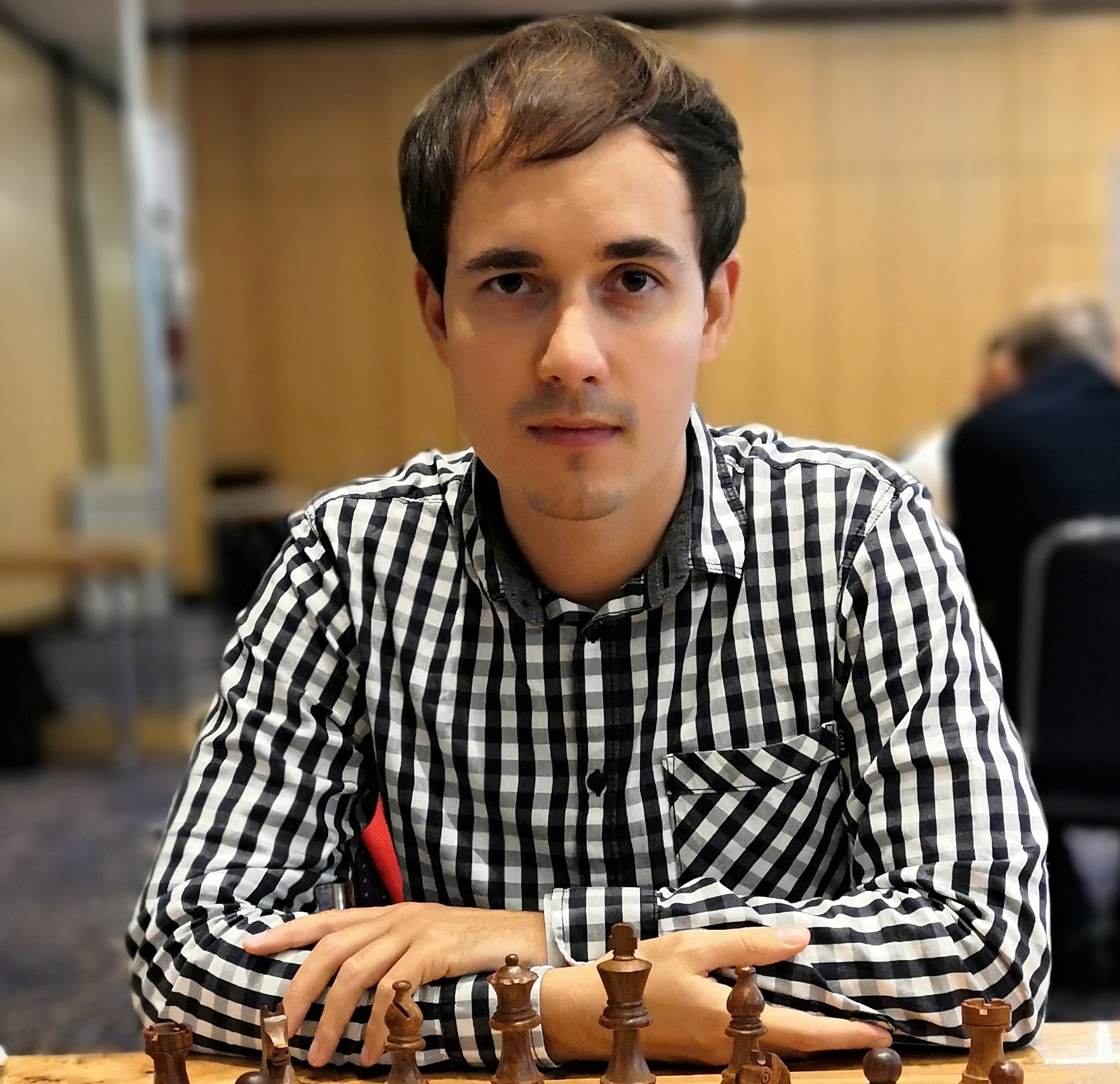
- Sebastian Bogner, 2016

Personal information
- Born: 17 January 1991 (age 35) Pforzheim, Germany

Chess career
- Country: Germany (until 2013); Switzerland (since 2013)
- Title: Grandmaster (2009)
- FIDE rating: 2545 (July 2026)
- Peak rating: 2619 (August 2018)

Sebastian Bogner (born 17 January 1991) is a German-Swiss chess grandmaster. He represented Germany until transferring to Switzerland in 2013. He won the Swiss Chess Championship in 2018, 2024 and 2025.

== Chess career ==
Born in 1991, Bogner earned his international master title in 2005 and his grandmaster title in 2009. He competed for Germany at the 39th Chess Olympiad. He transferred to Switzerland in 2013. He competed for Switzerland at the 42nd Chess Olympiad. In March 2018, he competed in the European Individual Chess Championship. He placed sixty-eighth, scoring 6½/11 (+4–2=5). He won the Swiss Chess Championship in July 2018. He is the No. 2 ranked Swiss player as of July 2021, with a rating of 2581, behind only Vadim Milov.

In July 2021, Bogner competed in the FIDE World Cup, and was eliminated in the first round by Indian grandmaster P. Iniyan.
