= Josef Kupper =

Swiss chess player (1932–2017)

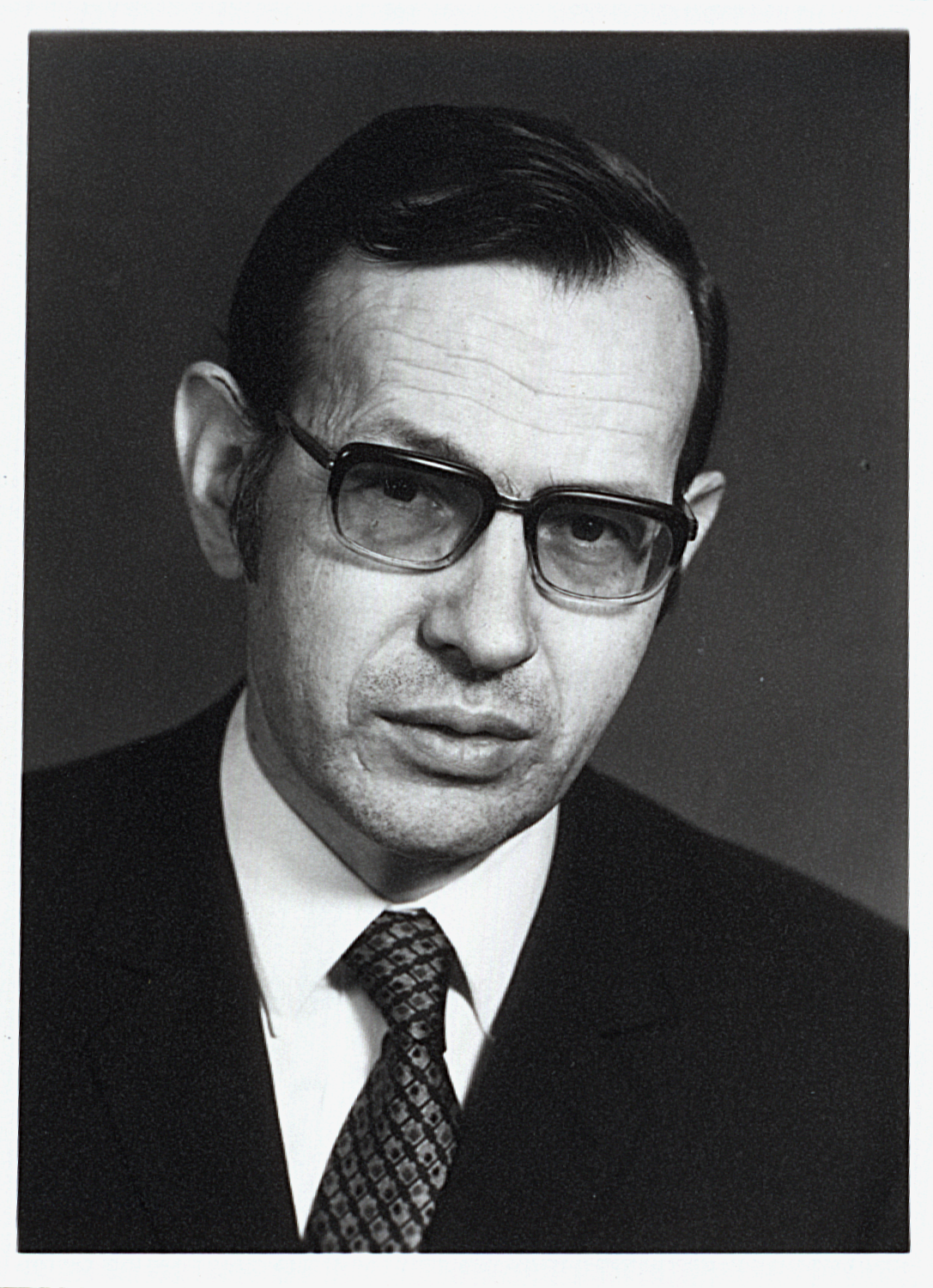

Personal information
- Born: 10 March 1932 Lucerne, Switzerland
- Died: 5 June 2017 (aged 85) Zürich, Switzerland

Chess career
- Country: Switzerland
- Title: International Master (1955)
- Peak rating: 2380 (July 1971)

Josef Kupper (10 March 1932 – 5 June 2017) was a Swiss chess International Master (IM) (1955), three-time Swiss Chess Championship winner (1954, 1957, 1962) and Chess Olympiad individual silver medal winner (1954).

== Biography ==
In the 1950s and 1960s, Josef Kupper was one of the leading Swiss chess players. He three times won Swiss Chess Championships: in 1954, 1957 and 1962. In 1959, Josef Kupper participated in the Zürich International Chess Tournament, which took the 9th place, the highest among all Swiss chess players playing in the tournament.

Josef Kupper played for Switzerland in the Chess Olympiads:

- In 1954, at first board in the 11th Chess Olympiad in Amsterdam (+8, =4, -2) and won individual silver medal,
- In 1958, at first board in the 13th Chess Olympiad in Munich (+4, =6, -4),
- In 1964, at first board in the 16th Chess Olympiad in Tel Aviv (+8, =6, -1),
- In 1968, at second board in the 18th Chess Olympiad in Lugano (+5, =4, -5).

Josef Kupper played for Switzerland in the European Team Chess Championship preliminaries:

- In 1961, at second board in the 2nd European Team Chess Championship preliminaries (+1, =0, -1),
- In 1973, at fifth board in the 5th European Team Chess Championship preliminaries (+2, =0, -0),
- In 1977, at sixt board in the 6th European Team Chess Championship preliminaries (+1, =3, -0).

Also Josef Kupper twelve times participated in Clare Benedict Chess Cup (1953, 1956, 1958, 1960, 1962–1963, 1966–1967, 1969–1970, 1972–1973) and in team competition won gold (1958), silver (1969) and two bronze (1953, 1960) medals, and in individual competition won five gold (1953, 1956, 1963, 1969, 1970) medals.

In 1955, he awarded the FIDE International Master (IM) title.
