= Shahanah Schmid =

Swiss chess player (born 1976)

Personal information
- Born: 13 February 1976 (age 50) Saanen, Switzerland

Chess career
- Country: Switzerland
- Title: Woman FIDE Master (1999)
- Peak rating: 2135 (July 1997)

Shahanah Dawn Schmid (born 13 February 1976) is a Swiss chess player, Woman FIDE Master (1999), two time Swiss Women's Chess Championship winner (1994, 1999).

== Biography ==
Shahanah Schmid grew up in Saanen. She studied sociology, social anthropology and pedagogy at the University of Zurich, where she was a research assistant at the Institute for Social and Cultural Anthropology. She then began doctoral studies at the London School of Economics. She is a teaching assistant at the Institute of Sociology there.

== Chess career ==
She won the Swiss Girls U16 Chess Championship three times: in 1990 in Gstaad, 1991 in Uzwil and 1992 in Reiden. Shahanah Schmid represented Switzerland in World Girls U20 Chess Championships (1995, 1996). She has competed many times in the individual finals of the Swiss Women's Chess Championships and won gold medals two times (1994, 1999). In 1999 Shahanah Schmid participated in Women's World Chess Championship Central Europe Zonal tournament in Dresden and shared 16th–17th place.

Shahanah Schmid played for Switzerland in the Women's Chess Olympiads:

- In 1994, at third board in the 31st Chess Olympiad (women) in Moscow (+1, =1, -7),
- In 1998, at second board in the 33rd Chess Olympiad (women) in Elista (+4, =4, -4).
