= Dieter Keller =

Swiss chess player

Personal information
- Born: 19 July 1936 (age 89)

Chess career
- Country: Switzerland
- Title: International Master (1961)
- Peak rating: 2420 (January 1986)

Dieter René Keller (born 19 July 1936) is a Swiss chess master. He worked as a lawyer.

In 1953, he tied for 5-8th in Copenhagen (2nd World Junior Championship; Oscar Panno won the title; Keller was the only player to beat Panno during that tournament, winning their individual game in the preliminaries, drawing it in the final stage). In 1955, he took 6th in Antwerp (3rd World Junior-ch; Boris Spassky won). At this Tournament he met his future wife.

In 1955, he took 4th in San Benedetto del Tronto. In 1959, he took 12th in Zurich (Mikhail Tal won). Keller beat Robert James Fischer in their individual game there. In 1960, he took 2nd in Zurich. In 1961, he took 8th in Zurich (Paul Keres won). In 1961, he tied for 1st-2nd with Carlos Guimard in Enschede. In 1975, he tied for 1st-3rd in Zurich International.

Always an amateur player, he did not play much international tournaments and missed many team events due to professional obligations. Nevertheless, Dieter Keller beat many greats of his time: Robert James Fischer, Bent Larsen, Efim Geller, Jan Hein Donner, Arturo Pomar, Jonathan Penrose, or mentioned Oscar Panno.

Keller was Swiss Champion in 1958, 1960, 1961, and 1963. He played for Switzerland in three Chess Olympiads, representing his country on board one when Switzerland was the hosting nation of the Chess Olympiad at Lugano in 1968.

- In 1956, at fourth board in 12th Olympiad in Moscow (+5 –5 =6);
- In 1958, at third board in 13th Olympiad in Munich (+0 –1 =4);
- In 1968, at first board in 18th Olympiad in Lugano (+4 –3 =7).

Keller also played once in 1st World Team Chess Championship at Lucerne 1985 (+3 –2 =3).

He played for Switzerland in Clare Benedict Cup three times, 1958, 1960, and 1969.

Keller was awarded the International Master (IM) title in 1961.

== Notable chess games ==
- Efim Geller vs Dieter Keller, Moscow 1956, English, Symmetrical, A34, 0-1
- Robert James Fischer vs Dieter, Zürich 1959, Ruy Lopez, Closed, C92, 0-1
- Bent Larsen vs Dieter Keller, Zürich 1961, Hungarian Opening, A00, 0-1
