= Lucas Brunner =

Swiss chess grandmaster (born 1967)

Personal information
- Born: 29 May 1967 (age 59) Bern, Switzerland

Chess career
- Country: West Germany (until 1990); Switzerland (since 1990)
- Title: Grandmaster (1994)
- FIDE rating: 2402 (July 2026)
- Peak rating: 2535 (January 1995)

Lucas Brunner (born 29 May 1967) is a Swiss chess grandmaster. He was Swiss Chess Champion in 1994.

== Chess career ==
Brunner was born in Bern on 29 May 1967. He moved to West Germany as a child, where he won the German U20 Chess Championship and earned his international master title in 1986. He returned to Switzerland in 1990 and became the first Swiss-born grandmaster when he achieved the title in 1994. He also won the Swiss Chess Championship that year. He is the No. 9 ranked Swiss player as of February 2018.
