= Jules Ehrat =

Swiss chess player

Jules Ehrat (1 February 1905 – 1997) was a Swiss chess player born in Lohn, Schaffhausen. He was the 1942 Swiss Chess Champion jointly with Martin Christoffel.

The Jules Ehrat Memorial chess tournament held in Zürich 13–22 August 1999 pitted two five–player teams against each other. The German team, led by Christopher Lutz, defeated the Swiss team, led by Viktor Korchnoi, by 26½ to 23½.
