= Andreas Huss =

Swiss chess player (born 1950)

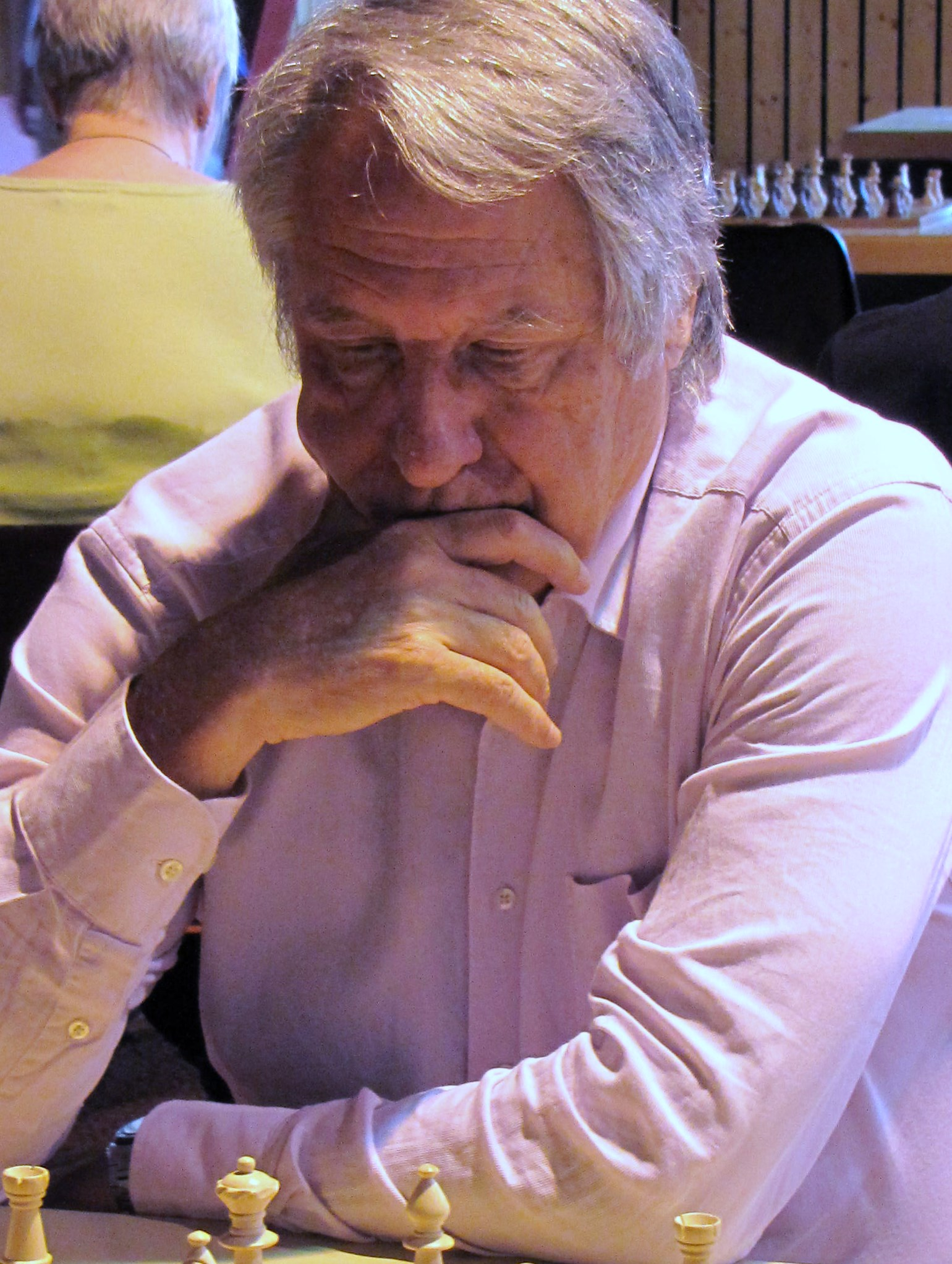
- Andreas Huss in 2013

Personal information
- Born: 15 October 1950 (age 75)

Chess career
- Country: Switzerland
- Title: International Master (1987)
- Peak rating: 2430 (July 1994)

Andreas Huss (born 15 October 1950) is a Swiss chess International Master (IM), Swiss Chess Championship winner (1983), Chess Olympiads individual medalist (1976, 1982).

== Biography ==
From the begin 1970s to the mid-1990s, Andreas Huss was one of the leading Swiss chess players. In 1970/71, in Groningen he ranked 11th in 9th Niemeyer Chess Tournament. In 1983 Andreas Huss won Swiss Chess Championship.

Andreas Huss played for Switzerland and Switzerland-2 in the Chess Olympiads:

- In 1970, at first reserve board in the 19th Chess Olympiad in Siegen (+2, =3, -1),
- In 1976, at fourth board in the 22nd Chess Olympiad in Haifa (+5, =3, -2) and won individual silver medal,
- In 1978, at first reserve board in the 23rd Chess Olympiad in Buenos Aires (+3, =3, -3),
- In 1980, at third board in the 24th Chess Olympiad in La Valletta (+1, =2, -5),
- In 1982, at fourth board in the 25th Chess Olympiad in Lucerne (+6, =2, -2) and won individual bronze medal,
- In 1984, at first reserve board in the 26th Chess Olympiad in Thessaloniki (+3, =4, -3),
- In 1994, at second reserve board in the 31st Chess Olympiad in Moscow (+4, =3, -2).

Andreas Huss played for Switzerland in the European Team Chess Championship preliminaries:

- In 1977, at seventh board in the 6th European Team Chess Championship preliminaries (+2, =2, -0),
- In 1980, at sixth board in the 7th European Team Chess Championship preliminaries (+0, =2, -2),
- In 1983, at first reserve board in the 8th European Team Chess Championship preliminaries (+0, =3, -0).

Andreas Huss played for Switzerland in the World Student Team Chess Championships:

- In 1972, at third board in the 19th World Student Team Chess Championship in Graz (+4, =3, -4),
- In 1974, at first board in the 20th World Student Team Chess Championship in Teesside (+4, =3, -4),
- In 1976, at second board in the 21st World Student Team Chess Championship in Caracas (+4, =2, -3).

Andreas Huss played for Switzerland in the Men's Chess Mitropa Cups:

- In 1977, at second board in the 2nd Chess Mitropa Cup in Bad Kohlgrub (+3, =2, -0) and won team silver and individual gold medals,
- In 1980, at third board in the 5th Chess Mitropa Cup in Rovinj (+1, =1, -3),
- In 1981, at fourth board in the 6th Chess Mitropa Cup in Luxembourg (+5, =1, -0) and won team bronze and individual gold medals,
- In 1982, at fourth board in the 7th Chess Mitropa Cup in Bourgoin-Jallieu (+2, =1, -2),
- In 1983, at second board in the 8th Chess Mitropa Cup in Lienz (+1, =3, -1) and won team bronze medal,
- In 1984, at fourth board in the 9th Chess Mitropa Cup in Bad Lauterberg (+3, =2, -1),
- In 1987, at fourth board in the 11th Chess Mitropa Cup in Mürren (+1, =1, -2),
- In 1993, at fourth board in the 15th Chess Mitropa Cup in Bad Wörishofen (+1, =6, -2),
- In 1995, at second board in the 16th Chess Mitropa Cup in Bükfürdö (+2, =4, -0),
- In 2003, at reserve board in the 22nd Chess Mitropa Cup in Pula (+2, =2, -3),
- In 2008, at third board in the 27th Chess Mitropa Cup in Olbia (+1, =3, -3),
- In 2009, at third board in the 28th Chess Mitropa Cup in Rogaška Slatina (+0, =0, -6).

Andreas Huss played for Switzerland in the Clare Benedict Chess Cups:

- In 1974, at fourth board in the 21st Clare Benedict Chess Cup in Cala Galdana (+2, =0, -1) and won team bronze medal,
- In 1979, at fourth board in the 23rd Clare Benedict Chess Cup in Cleveland (+1, =3, -1).

In 1987, Andreas Huss was awarded the FIDE International Master (IM) title.
