= Fritz Gygli =

Swiss chess player

Fritz Gygli (12 November 1896 in Villachern – 27 April 1980 in Zürich) was a Swiss chess master.

He tied for 3rd-4th at St. Gallen 1920, tied for 4-8th at Neuchâtel 1922, shared 2nd at Interlaken 1924, took 2nd at Zurich 1925, tied for 3rd-4th at Geneva 1926, tied for 5-6th at Biel 1927, tied for 4-5th at Basel 1928, took 3rd at Schaffhausen, and took 5th at Lausanne 1930.

In the 1930s, he took 4th at Berne 1932 (Quadrangular), took 15th at Berne 1932 (an event won by Alexander Alekhine), tied for 3rd-4th at Berne 1933 (Quadrangular), took 11th at Zürich 1934 (Alekhine won), and took 6th at Montreux 1939.

Gygli represented Switzerland in Chess Olympiads at The Hague 1928, Warsaw 1935, and in 3rd unofficial Chess Olympiad, Munich 1936. He also played in friendly matches for Switzerland against France (1946), Yugoslavia (1949), and West Germany (1952).

He won the Swiss Championship in 1941.
