= Ivan Nemet =

Serbian-born Croat-Swiss chess grandmaster

Personal information
- Born: 14 April 1943 Sombor, Kingdom of Hungary
- Died: 16 December 2007 (aged 64) Basel, Switzerland

Chess career
- Country: Yugoslavia; Switzerland
- Title: Grandmaster (1978)
- Peak rating: 2470 (January 1979)

Ivan Nemet (14 April 1943 – 16 December 2007) was a Serbian-born Croat-Swiss chess grandmaster. He was Croatian Chess Champion in 1973 , Yugoslav Chess Champion in 1979 and Swiss Chess Champion in 1990.

== Biography ==
Nemet was born in Sombor, Yugoslavia (now part of Vojvodina, Serbia). He became an international master in 1976, and earned his grandmaster title in 1978. He won the Yugoslav Chess Championship in 1979. He moved to Switzerland in the early 1980s, winning the Swiss Chess Championship in 1990. He died on 16 December 2007, due to a heart attack.
