= Roland Ekström =

Swiss chess player (born 1956)

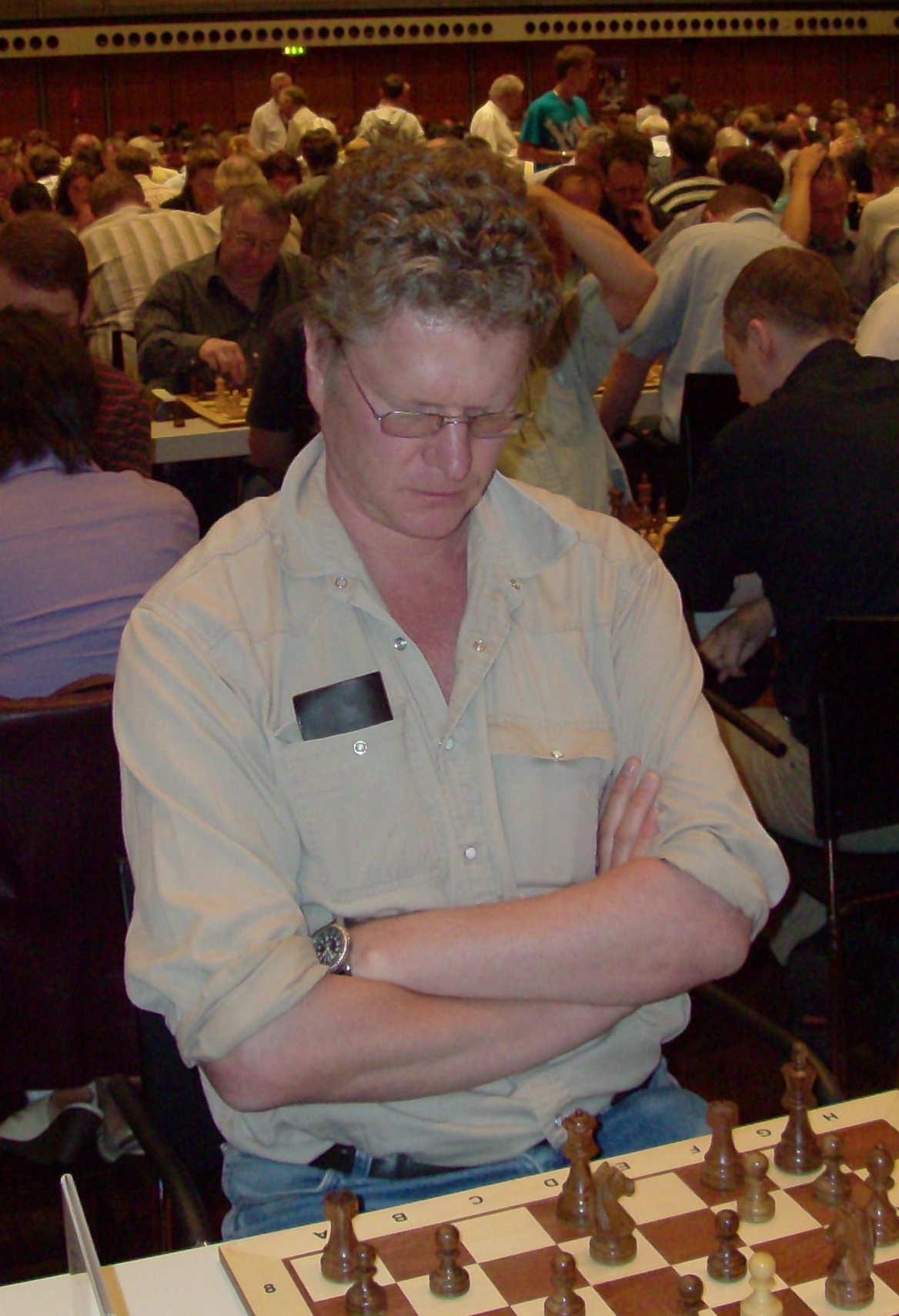
- Roland Ekström in 2009

Personal information
- Born: 22 May 1956 (age 70) Stockholm, Sweden

Chess career
- Country: Sweden (until 1993); Switzerland (since 1993)
- Title: International Master (1982)
- Peak rating: 2510 (July 1998)

Roland Ekström (born 22 May 1956) is a Swedish and Swiss chess player, International Master (1982), four time Swiss Chess Championship winner (1988, 1989, 2001, 2008).

== Chess career ==
In 1972, Roland Ekström won Swedish Junior Chess Championship in Skellefteå. In 1975–1979 he participated in the individual finals of the Swedish Chess Championship four times, achieving his greatest success in 1975 in Gothenburg where he won silver medal. From the beginning of the 1980s, he started playing mainly in chess tournaments organized in Switzerland. Roland Ekström has four individual gold medals in the Swiss Chess Championships, which he won in 1988, 1999, 2001 and 2008.

Roland Ekström twice took part in World Chess Championship Zonal tournaments (1998 and 2000), but did not achieve significant results. His successes in international chess tournaments include: shared 1st place in Banja Luka (1987, together with Krunoslav Hulak) and shared 1st place in Bad Wiessee (2000, together with Gerald Hertneck, Konstantin Lerner and Alexander Graf).

Roland Ekström played for Switzerland in the Chess Olympiads:

- In 1996, at fourth board in the 32nd Chess Olympiad in Yerevan (+5, =3, -2),
- In 1998, at fourth board in the 33rd Chess Olympiad in Elista (+4, =6, -1),
- In 2002, at first reserve board in the 35th Chess Olympiad in Bled (+1, =2, -3),
- In 2010, at third board in the 39th Chess Olympiad in Khanty-Mansiysk (+3, =3, -1).

Roland Ekström played for Sweden (1989) and Switzerland in the European Team Chess Championships:

- In 1989, at sixth board in the 9th European Team Chess Championship in Haifa (+2, =1, -3),
- In 2001, at first reserve board in the 13th European Team Chess Championship in León (+1, =2, -3),
- In 2007, at first reserve board in the 16th European Team Chess Championship in Heraklion (+1, =3, -1),
- In 2009, at fourth board in the 17th European Team Chess Championship in Novi Sad (+2, =4, -1).

Roland Ekström played for Switzerland in the World Team Chess Championship:

- In 1997, at second reserve board in the 4th World Team Chess Championship in Lucerne (+1, =1, -2).

In 1982, he was awarded the FIDE International Master (IM) title.

Roland Ekström achieved the highest rating in his career so far on July 1, 1998, with a score of 2510 points, he was then 5th among Swiss chess players.

== Other successes ==
In 1998, 2000 and 2005 he won the Swiss backgammon championship three times.
