= Max Pestalozzi =

Swiss chess player

Max Pestalozzi (1857 in Zurich – 1925 in Zurich) was a Swiss chess master.

Son of Adolf Salomon, banker, and Magdalena Berta Schulthess. He was a mathematician until 1889. From 1889 to 1921 he worked for the Swiss Railways. He was co-founder and first president of the Schachgesellschaft Zürich, the oldest chess club in the world.

He was joint Swiss champion in 1889, 1890 and 1901, and defeated Dietrich Duhm in 1900.

== Bibliography ==
- F. Schumacher, Das eidgenössische Eisenbahndepartement, 1914, 321
- Der Bund, 10.6.1925
- Schweizerische Schachzeitung / Revue Suisse D'Echecs / Rivista Scacchistica Svizzera, 1925, 108 sg.; 1989, 81 sg.
- The World’s Oldest Chess Club: Part I (1809–1914), https://web.archive.org/web/20131015163527/http://en.chessbase.com/home/TabId/211/PostId/4005531 (retrieved 15/10/13).
- Two great presidents, https://web.archive.org/web/20140716155210/http://www.sgzurich2009.ch/pages/jubeAds/presidents.php?lang=en (retrieved 15/10/13).
- Dizionario storico della Svizzera, http://www.hls-dhs-dss.ch/textes/i/I26417.php?topdf=1 (in Italian, retrieved 15/10/13).
