= Andreas Duhm =

German–Swiss chess player

Andreas Duhm (22 August 1883, Göttingen – 23 November 1975, Heidelberg) was a German–Swiss chess master.

Born in Göttingen, Germany, he was the younger brother of Hans Duhm and Dietrich Duhm. His father, Bernhard Duhm, was a professor for Protestant theology (Old Testament) in Göttingen and Basel, Switzerland. Andreas studied theology too.

He won three Swiss Chess Championships at Bern 1900, St. Gallen 1901 (jointly with Pestalozzi, Hans Duhm, and Meyer), and at Basel 1913. He also won at Karlsruhe 1911, Kitzingen 1913 (triangular), and Heidelberg 1913 (followed by Solomon Rosenthal, Dietrich Duhm, etc.), and tied for 4-5th with Alexander Ilyin-Genevsky at Montreux 1914 (SUI-ch, D. Duhm and Moriz Henneberger won), and took 4th at Baden-Baden 1921 (the 3rd Badischen Kongress, quadrangular, D. Duhm won).
