= Adolf Staehelin =

Swiss chess player

Personal information
- Born: 5 April 1901 Basel, Switzerland
- Died: 30 May 1965 (aged 64) Zürich, Switzerland

Chess career
- Country: Switzerland

Adolf Staehelin (also Adolf Stähelin; 5 April 1901 — 30 May 1965) was a Swiss chess player, Swiss Chess Championship winner (1927).

== Biography ==
In the 1920s and 1930s, Adolf Staehelin was one of the leading Swiss chess players. In 1927, he won the Swiss Chess Championship. In 1932, Staehelin participated in strong International Chess Tournament in Bern (tournament won Alexander Alekhine). He was Vice President of the Zürich Chess Society.

Staehelin played for Switzerland in the Chess Olympiad:

- In 1935, at fourth board in the 6th Chess Olympiad in Warsaw (+2, =3, -11).

He played for Switzerland in the unofficial Chess Olympiad:

- In 1936, at sixth board in the 3rd unofficial Chess Olympiad in Munich (+4, =5, -9).
