= Swiss Chess Championship =

National chess competition

The Swiss Chess Championship is held annually during two weeks of July. It is organised by the Swiss Chess Federation (the SSB), which has been a member of the overall governing body, Swiss Olympic, since 2000. The SSB is itself a relatively new organising body, created in 1995 as a fusion of two older organisations; these were the former Swiss Chess Federation (the SSV, founded 1889 for the inaugural Championship and prior to 1960, known as the Swiss Chess Association) and the Swiss Worker Chess Federation (the SASB, founded 1923).

From its inception, the Championship format was a 10-player all-play-all, open to both nationals and overseas players. The title of Swiss Champion was however reserved for the highest placed Swiss national. Various changes have been implemented along the way, particularly in respect of the introduction of new Championship categories. The two world wars prevented the Championship from taking place on a small number of occasions, but due to Switzerland's neutral status, the event was less badly affected than in many other countries. There was no competition held in 1968 due to the clash with the Chess Olympiad held in Lugano.

In 2008 the Championship underwent major changes, including running two alternate formats effectively in parallel. The changes were aimed at keeping the tournament accessible to home and overseas players, while expanding the range of opportunities for nationals, both in terms of the Championship itself and also for Elo rating and title seeking purposes. This radically different approach gave rise to a two-year cycle, comprising an open tournament every odd year and a closed (Swiss nationals only) tournament every even year.

Since 2018, the Championship is conducted as an annual, closed, 10-Player Single Round Robin Invitational featuring the best Swiss chess players. Since 2019, The Women's title is distributed in a 6-Player Double Round Robin Invitational. The title for Swiss Junior Champion is awarded to the best placed U20-player in the parallel Master Tournament. Whilst both closed title tournaments are reserved for Switzerland's chess elite, The Master Tournament still features many foreign players. Yet, only Swiss players are eligible for the U20 title. Furthermore, the best placed Swiss player is awarded a spot in the title tournament of the following year.

Throughout the event's long history, several players have won multiple titles, but Hans Johner earns a special mention for his 12 titles, spanning an incredible forty-two years (1908–1950). Joe Gallagher, a seven-times Champion, has dual nationality and also won the British Championship in 2001, a unique achievement.

== Open Champions ==
Year	Venue	Men's champion
1889	Zürich	Max Pestalozzi; Artur Popławski
1890	Winterthur	Max Pestalozzi; Artur Popławski
1892	Basel	Oswald Corrodi; Paul Fahrni
1893	Bern	Alex Popoff
1895	Zürich	Ulrich Bachmann
1896	Luzern	Ulrich Bachmann; Alfred Stooss
1897	Aarau	Hermann Sack
1898	Basel	Ulrich Bachmann
1899	Lausanne	Moriz Henneberger
1900	Bern	Andreas Duhm
1901	St. Gallen	Max Pestalozzi; Eugen Meyer; Andreas Duhm; Hans Duhm
1902	Biel	Eugen Meyer
1903	Zürich	Ernst Müller
1904	Luzern	Walter Henneberger
1905	Neuenburg	Alfred Hänni
1906	Basel	Moriz Henneberger; Walter Henneberger
1907	Schaffhausen	Dietrich Duhm; Paul Johner; Karl Kunz
1908	Bern	Hans Johner; Paul Johner
1909	Zürich	Moriz Henneberger
1910	Geneva	Oskar Naegeli
1911	Davos	Moriz Henneberger; Walter Henneberger; Kurt Krantz; Erwin Voellmy
1912	Lausanne	Walter Henneberger
1913	Basel	Andreas Duhm
1914	Montreux	Dietrich Duhm; Moriz Henneberger
1920	St. Gallen	Erwin Voellmy
1922	Neuenburg	Erwin Voellmy
1923	Bern	Hans Johner
1924	Interlaken	Otto Zimmermann
1925	Zürich	Paul Johner
1926	Geneva	Walter Michel
1927	Biel	Adolf Staehelin
1928	Basel	Hans Johner; Paul Johner
1929	Schaffhausen	Hans Johner
1930	Lausanne	Paul Johner
1931	Winterthur	Hans Johner
1932	Bern	Hans Johner; Paul Johner

Year	Venue	Men's champion
1934	Zürich	Hans Johner
1935	Aarau	Hans Johner
1936	Luzern	Oskar Naegeli
1937	Interlaken	Hans Johner
1938	Basel	Hans Johner
1939	Montreux	Henri Grob
1941	Aarau, Basel; Bern, Zürich	Fritz Gygli
1942	Lausanne	Jules Ehrat
1943	St. Gallen	Martin Christoffel
1944	Vevey	Paulin Lob
1945	Lugano	Martin Christoffel
1946	Winterthur	Ernst Strehle
1947	Neuenburg	Hans Johner
1948	Bern	Martin Christoffel
1949	Schaffhausen	Serge Tordion
1950	Luzern	Hans Johner
1951	Geneva	Henri Grob
1952	Zürich	Martin Christoffel
1953	Solothurn	Max Blau
1954	Basel	Josef Kupper
1955	Rapperswil	Max Blau
1956	Thun	Max Blau
1957	Lausanne	Josef Kupper
1958	Lugano	Dieter Keller
1959	Biel	Paulin Lob
1960	Balgach	Dieter Keller
1961	Interlaken	Dieter Keller
1962	St. Gallen	Josef Kupper
1963	Basel	Dieter Keller
1964	Montreux	Marcel Markus
1965	Bern	Marcel Markus
1966	Lugano	Edwin Bhend
1967	Biel	Max Blau
1968		Not held
1969	Luzern	André Lombard
1970	Riehen	André Lombard
1971	Winterthur	Heinz Schaufelberger
1972	Locarno	Heinz Schaufelberger
1973	Weggis	André Lombard
1974	Wettingen	André Lombard
1975	Zürich	Werner Hug
1976	Ascona	Hansjürg Kaenel
1977	Muttenz	André Lombard
1978	St. Moritz	Hansjürg Kaenel
1979	Biel	Heinz Wirthensohn
1980	Ascona	Hansjürg Kaenel
1981	Biel	Heinz Wirthensohn
1982	Silvaplana	Viktor Korchnoi
1983	Baden	Andreas Huss
1984	Arosa	Viktor Korchnoi

Year	Venue	Men's champion
1985	Silvaplana	Viktor Korchnoi
1986	Basel	Markus Klauser
1987	Lenk	Richard Gerber
1988	Silvaplana	Roland Ekström
1989	Biel	Beat Züger
1990	Arosa	Ivan Nemet
1991	Chiasso	Jean-Luc Costa
1992	Leukerbad	Heinz Wirthensohn
1993	Silvaplana	Jean-Luc Costa
1994	Luzern	Lucas Brunner
1995	Villars, Ollon	Yannick Pelletier
1996	Arosa	Viktor Gavrikov
1997	Silvaplana	Joe Gallagher
1998	Engelberg	Joe Gallagher
1999	Grächen	Roland Ekström
2000	Pontresina	Yannick Pelletier
2001	Scuol	Roland Ekström
2002	Leukerbad	Yannick Pelletier
2003	Silvaplana	Florian Jenni
2004	Samnaun	Joe Gallagher
2005	Saas Almagell	Joe Gallagher
2006	Lenzerheide	Florian Jenni
2007	Leukerbad	Joe Gallagher
2008	Samnaun	Roland Ekström
2009	Grächen	Viktor Korchnoi
2010	Lenzerheide	Yannick Pelletier
2011	Leukerbad	Viktor Korchnoi
2012	Flims	Joe Gallagher
2013	Grächen	Alexandra Kosteniuk
2014	Bern	Yannick Pelletier
2015	Leukerbad	Vadim Milov
2016	Flims	Noel Studer
2017	Grächen	Yannick Pelletier
2018	Lenzerheide	Sebastian Bogner
2019	Leukerbad	Noel Studer
2020		Not held
2021	Flims	Joe Gallagher
2022	Samnaun	Fabian Bänziger
2023	Leukerbad	Fabian Bänziger
2024	Flims	Sebastian Bogner
2025	Disentis	Sebastian Bogner
2026	Grächen	Teimur Toktomushev

== Women's Champions ==
Year	Venue	Women's champion
1946	Winterthur	Mathilde Laeuger-Gasser
1948	Bern	Elisabeth Schild
1950	Luzern	Elisabeth Schild
1951	Genf	Lina Wiget
1953	Solothurn	Anna Näpfer
1954	Basel	Elisabeth Schild
1955	Rapperswil	Anna Näpfer
1956	Thun	Anna Näpfer
1957	Lausanne	Madeleine Batchinsky-Gaille
1958	Lugano	Anna Näpfer
1959	Biel	Anna Näpfer
1960	Balgach	Anna Näpfer
1961	Interlaken	Madeleine Batchinsky-Gaille
1963	Basel	Mathilde Laeuger
1964	Montreux	Monique Petit
1965	Bern	Maria Fässler; Cécile Huser; K. Fischler
1966	Lugano	Mathilde Laeuger
1967	Biel	Anna Näpfer
1968		Not held
1969	Luzern	Myrta Ludwig
1970	Riehen	Anna Näpfer
1971	Winterthur	Elsa Lüssy
1972	Locarno	Carla Wettstein
1973	Weggis	Elsa Lüssy
1974	Wettingen	Trudy André
1975	Zürich	Carla Wettstein
1976	Ascona	Anna Näpfer
1977	Muttenz	Myrta Ludwig
1978	St. Moritz	Myrta Ludwig
1979	Biel	Monique Ruck-Petit
1980	Ascona	Theres Leu
1981	Biel	Vanda Veprek-Bilinski
1982	Silvaplana	Claude Baumann
1983	Baden	Erika Vogel
1984	Arosa	Tatiana Lematschko
1985	Silvaplana	Anne Knecht
1986	Basel	Tatiana Lematschko
1987	Lenk	Claude Baumann
1988	Silvaplana	Claude Baumann
1989	Biel	Evi Reimer

Year	Venue	Women's champion
1990	Arosa	Silvia Schladetzky
1991	Chiasso	Claude Baumann
1992	Leukerbad	Evi Grünenwald-Reimer
1993	Silvaplana	Barbara Hund
1994	Luzern	Shahanah Schmid
1995	Villars, Ollon	Tatiana Lematschko
1996	Arosa	Evi Grünenwald-Reimer
1997	Silvaplana	Tatiana Lematschko
1998	Engelberg	Catherine Thürig
1999	Grächen	Shahanah Schmid
2000	Pontresina	Evi Grünenwald-Reimer
2001	Scuol	Monika Seps
2002	Leukerbad	Monika Seps
2003	Silvaplana	Tatiana Lematschko
2004	Samnaun	Tatiana Lematschko
2005	Saas Almagell	Monika Seps
2006	Lenzerheide	Tatiana Lematschko
2007	Leukerbad	Monika Seps
2008	Samnaun	Tatjana Lematschko
2009	Grächen	Tatjana Lematschko
2010	Lenzerheide	Tatjana Lematschko
2011	Leukerbad	Alexandra Kosteniuk
2012	Flims	Monika Seps
2013	Grächen	Alexandra Kosteniuk
2014	Bern	Gundula Heinatz
2015	Leukerbad	Alexandra Kosteniuk
2016	Flims	Laura Stoeri
2017	Grächen	Lena Georgescu
2018	Lenzerheide	Gundula Heinatz
2019	Leukerbad	Elena Sedina
2020		Not held
2021	Flims	Lena Georgescu
2022	Samnaun	Lena Georgescu
2023	Leukerbad	Sofiia Hryzlova
2026	Grächen	Sofiia Hryzlova
