= Carla Wettstein =

Australian chess player (born 1946)

Personal information
- Born: 1946 (age 79–80)

Chess career
- Country: Switzerland; Australia
- Peak rating: 1591 (November 2025)

Carla Wettstein (born 1946) is a Swiss and Australian chess player who two times won the Swiss Women's Chess Championship (1972, 1975). Women's Chess Olympiad individual bronze medalist (1976).

== Biography ==
In the 1970s Carla Wettstein was one of the leading Swiss women's chess players. She two times won the Swiss Women's Chess Championship: 1972 and 1975. In 1973, in Wijk aan Zee Carla Wettstein participated in FIDE Women's World Chess Championship European Zonal Tournament.

Carla Wettstein played for Switzerland in the Women's Chess Olympiad:

- In 1976, at third board in the 7th Chess Olympiad (women) in Haifa (+5, =3, -2) and won individual bronze medal.

Carla Wettstein later moved to Australia and rarely played in chess tournaments.
