= Monique Ruck-Petit =

French chess player

Personal information
- Born: 20 October 1942 (age 84)

Chess career
- Country: Switzerland; France

Monique Ruck-Petit, née Petit (French: [mɔnik ʁyk pəti]; born 20 October 1942), is a Swiss and French chess player, two-times Swiss Women's Chess Championship winner (1964, 1979), French Women's Chess Championship winner (1979), Women's Chess Olympiad individual bronze medal winner (1984).

== Biography ==
Ruck-Petit discovered chess at the age of 12. Her talent pushed her father to register her for several junior chess tournaments in Switzerland and allowed her, while a student at the Belvédère gymnasium in Lausanne, to be invited to the Jelmoli Cup in Zürich. In 1964, she won Swiss Women's Chess Championship without specific training, because at the same time she was preparing for her teacher's certificate. Three years later, she left Switzerland for France following her marriage to a Frenchman.

In 1979, the Swiss Women's Chess Championship was an international chess tournament played within the framework of the Biel Chess Festival and Monique Ruck-Petit finished sixth and became first Swiss women in the tournament. She won a second Swiss championship title, but her victory caused controversy because of her dual nationality obtained after her marriage. The next month, she also won French Women's Chess Championship.

Ruck-Petit played for France in the Women's Chess Olympiads:

- In 1976, at third board in the 7th Chess Olympiad (women) in Haifa (+1, =4, -2),
- In 1978, at third board in the 8th Chess Olympiad (women) in Buenos Aires (+3, =5, -2),
- In 1980, at second board in the 9th Chess Olympiad (women) in Valletta (+3, =2, -5),
- In 1982, at second board in the 10th Chess Olympiad (women) in Lucerne (+3, =1, -5),
- In 1984, at first reserve board in the 26th Chess Olympiad (women) in Thessaloniki (+5, =1, -1) and won individual bronze medal.
