= Max Blau =

Swiss chess player (1918–1984)

Max Blau (19 December 1918, Munich – 1984, Bern) was a Swiss chess master.

He won the Swiss Chess Championship four times (1953, 1955, 1956, and 1967), and was awarded the International Master title in 1953.

Blau represented Switzerland in Chess Olympiads (seven times, from 1954 to 1968), in Clare Benedict Chess Cup (fourteen times, from 1953 to 1972, and won three individual and one team gold medals), and in friendly matches against France (1946, 1965), Yugoslavia (1949, 1950), West Germany (1951, 1952), Spain (1953, 1954), Austria (1953, 1955), and Italy (1951, 1952, 1958, 1969).

In tournaments, he tied for 7–8th at Hilversum 1947 (zonal), won at Lucerne 1949/50, took 4th at Zurich 1952, tied for 15–16th at Zurich 1959, and won at Birseck 1961.
