= Martin Christoffel =

Swiss chess player

Christoffel (right) (Groningen, 1946)

Dr. Martin Christoffel (21 September 1922 – 3 April 2001) was a Swiss chess champion born in Basel. In 1944 he won the Coupe Suisse knockout tournament. Christoffel won the Swiss Chess Championship in 1943, 1945, 1948, and 1952, and was joint champion with Jules Ehrat in 1942. In 1946, he represented Switzerland at the Groningen International Tournament - the first major Post WWII chess event but finished last.

The 1952 Swiss Championship was an international tournament with eight Swiss players and six international players organized by Schachgesellschaft Zürich. Christoffel tied for second with Max Euwe (Netherlands), behind Erik Lundin (Sweden). FIDE subsequently awarded Christoffel the International Master title in 1952.

In 1989, Christoffel became an International Master of Correspondence Chess (IMC), and a Senior IMC in 1990. He won the Swiss Senior Championship in 1990, 1991, 1992, and 1994. From 1987 to 1991, he was president of the Swiss Chess Federation.

He died in Rombach.
