= Evi Grünenwald =

Swiss chess player

Personal information
- Born: Evi Reimer; 5 January 1964 Therwil, Switzerland
- Died: 5 June 2026 (aged 62)

Chess career
- Country: Switzerland
- Title: Woman FIDE Master (1990)
- Peak rating: 2115 (July 1990)

Evi Grünenwald (5 January 1964 – 5 June 2026) was a Swiss chess player, Woman FIDE Master (1990), four time Swiss Women's Chess Championship winner (1989, 1992, 1996, 2000).

== Chess career ==
Evi Grünenwald was born in Therwil and grew up there. She was a member of the Therwil chess club.

She has competed many times in the individual finals of the Swiss Women's Chess Championships and won gold medals four times (1989, 1992, 1996, 2000).

Evi Grünenwald played for Switzerland in the Women's Chess Olympiads:

- In 1996, at second board in the 32nd Chess Olympiad (women) in Yerevan (+1, =2, -6),
- In 2000, at third board in the 34th Chess Olympiad (women) in Istanbul (+3, =3, -4).

In 2002 she played her last competitive game in the Swiss Team Chess Championship] and in the German 2nd Women's Chess Bundesliga.
