= Heinz Schaufelberger =

Swiss chess player (1947–2020)

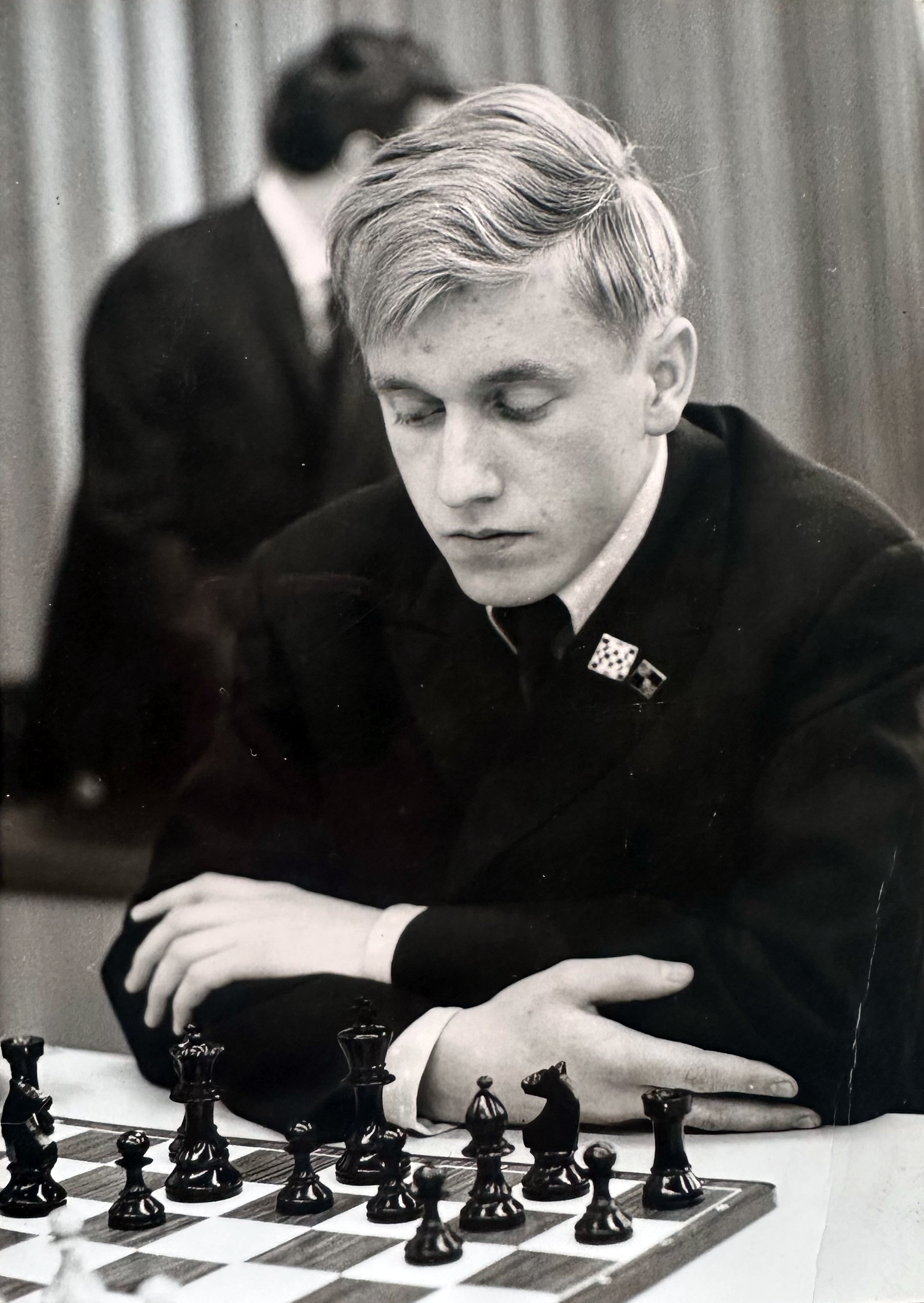

Personal information
- Born: 19 November 1947
- Died: 16 February 2020 (aged 72)

Chess career
- Country: Switzerland
- Title: FIDE Master (1983)
- Peak rating: 2355 (July 1973)

Heinz Schaufelberger (19 November 1947 – 16 February 2020) was a Swiss chess FIDE Master who won the Swiss Chess Championship twice (1971, 1972).

== Biography ==
In 1966–1968, Heinz Schaufelberger represented Switzerland three times at the European Junior Chess Championship, achieving the best result in 1969 in Groningen, where he finished sixth. In 1969, in Praia da Rocha, he participated in the World Chess Championships Zonal tournament and ranked 9th. In 1971, in Birseck, he shared 3rd place with Andreas Dückstein behind Gedeon Barcza and Stefano Tatai. In 1971 and 1972, he won the Swiss Chess Championship twice in a row.

Heinz Schaufelberger played for Switzerland in the Chess Olympiads:

- In 1970, at the second board in the 19th Chess Olympiad in Siegen (+7, =0, -4),
- In 1972, at the fourth board in the 20th Chess Olympiad in Skopje (+5, =6, -4),
- In 1974, at the third board in the 21st Chess Olympiad in Nice (+5, =6, -3).

Heinz Schaufelberger played for Switzerland in the European Team Chess Championship:

- In 1973, at the third board in the 5th European Team Chess Championship in Bath (+0, =4, -2).

Heinz Schaufelberger also played for Switzerland in the Men's Chess Mitropa Cup twice (1976, 1982) and won a silver medal in team competition (1976). Heinz Schaufelberger three times played for Switzerland in the Clare Benedict Chess Cups (1970-1971, 1973).
