= Hansjürg Kaenel =

Swiss chess player

Personal information
- Born: 16 February 1952 (age 74)

Chess career
- Country: Switzerland
- Title: International Master (1995)
- Peak rating: 2452 (July 2000)

Hansjürg Kaenel (born 16 February 1952) is a Swiss chess player, International Master (1995), and three time Swiss Chess Championship winner (1976, 1978, 1980).

== Chess career ==
In 1972 in Arosa Hansjürg Kaenel won the international chess tournament for juniors up to 20 years old. In the following years, he repeatedly took part in the individual finals of the Swiss Chess Championships, winning gold medals three times (1976, 1978, 1980).

Hansjürg Kaenel achieved several successes in international chess tournaments, including: 3rd place in Zweisimmen (1993, after Eliahu Shvidler and Ovidiu-Doru Foișor), 1st place in Bern (1996, before, among others . Adrian Mikhalchishin, Andrei Sokolov, Henrik Teske and Vladimir Tukmakov), shared 1st place in Zürich (1999, together with, among others, Florin Gheorghiu), shared 2nd place in Lugano (2000, after Stefan Đurić, together with, among others, Csaba Horváth) and shared 1st place in Lenzerheide (2006, Swiss Open Championship, together with, among others, Sophie Milliet).

Hansjürg Kaenel played for Switzerland and Switzerland-2 (1982) in the Chess Olympiads:

- In 1982, at first reserve board in the 25th Chess Olympiad in Lucerne (+6, =0, -5),
- In 1986, at second reserve board in the 27th Chess Olympiad in Dubai (+4, =3, -2),
- In 1996, at second reserve board in the 32nd Chess Olympiad in Yerevan (+2, =2, -3).

Hansjürg Kaenel played for Switzerland in the Clare Benedict Chess Cup:

- In 1977, at second board in the 22nd Clare Benedict Chess Cup in Copenhagen (+1, =2, -3).

In 1995, he was awarded the FIDE International Master (IM) title.

Hansjürg Kaenel achieved the highest rating in his career on July 1, 2000, with a score of 2452 points. He was 9th among Swiss chess players at that time.
