= Hans Johner =

Swiss chess player (1889–1975)

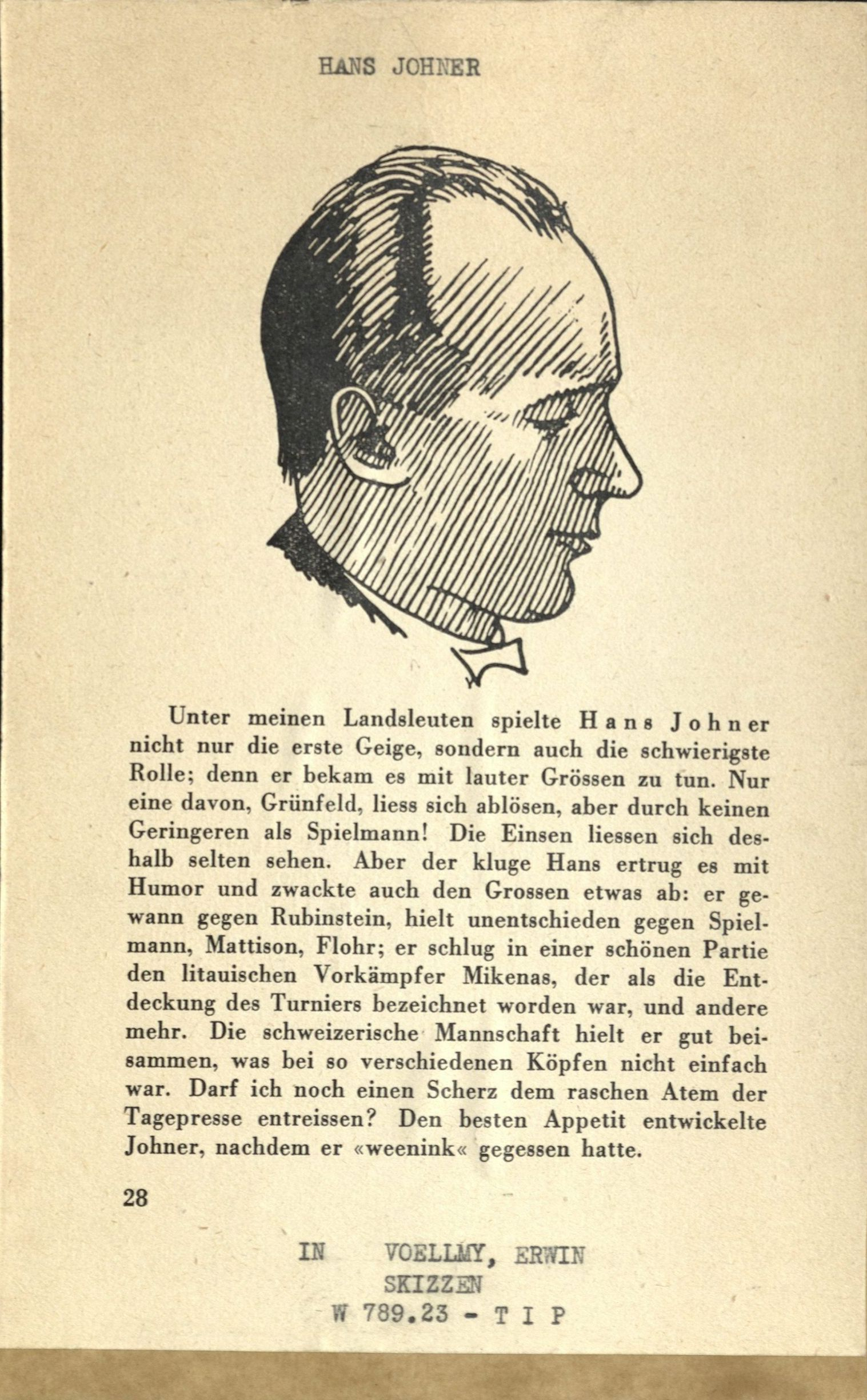
Hans Johner

Hans Johner (7 January 1889 in Basel – 2 December 1975 in Thalwil) was a Swiss chess player.

He was awarded the title of International Master in 1950, having been Swiss Champion on a number of occasions. His heyday was in the 1930s when he won this title on six occasions (in 1931, 1932, 1934, 1935, 1937, and 1938).

He played for Switzerland in 1st unofficial Chess Olympiad at Paris 1924, and thrice in official Chess Olympiads (1927, 1931, and 1956).

Younger brother of Paul Johner.

== Musical career ==
Hans Johner was also an accomplished musician, playing the viola and violin.

== Notable chess games ==
- Alexander Alekhine vs Hans Johner, Zürich 1934, Spanish Game, Morphy Defense, Steinitz Deferred, C79, 1-0
- Hans Muller vs Hans Johner, Zürich 1934, King's Indian, E70, 0-1
