= Catherine Thürig =

Swiss chess player

Personal information
- Born: 1958 (age 67–68)

Chess career
- Country: Switzerland
- Peak rating: 2120 (January 1996)

Catherine Thürig (born 1958) is a Swiss chess player, Swiss Women's Chess Championship winner (1998).

== Chess career ==
In the first half of the 1990s, Catherine Thürig was one of the strongest Swiss chess female players. She has competed many times in the individual finals of the Swiss Women's Chess Championships and won gold medal in 1998 in Engelberg. She is a member of the Olten chess club.

Catherine Thürig played for Switzerland in the Women's Chess Olympiads:

- In 1990, at first reserve board in the 29th Chess Olympiad (women) in Novi Sad (+3, =1, -4),
- In 1994, at first reserve board in the 31st Chess Olympiad (women) in Moscow (+5, =1, -5),
- In 1996, at third board in the 32nd Chess Olympiad (women) in Yerevan (+3, =3, -5).

Catherine Thürig played for Switzerland in the European Women's Team Chess Championships:

- In 2011, at reserve board in the 9th European Team Chess Championship (women) in Porto Carras (+0, =2, -0),
- In 2013, at reserve board in the 10th European Team Chess Championship (women) in Warsaw (+1, =0, -2).

In 2017 she was president of the organizing committee for the national chess tournament in Olten.

Catherine Thürig is IT manager for the municipality of Wallisellen.
