= Dietrich Duhm =

German–Swiss chess player

Dietrich Duhm (1880 in Göttingen – 22 July 1954 in Gailingen am Hochrhein) was a German–Swiss chess master.

Born in Göttingen, Germany, he was the brother of Hans Duhm and Andreas Duhm. His father, Bernhard Duhm, was a professor for Protestant theology (Old Testament) in Göttingen and Basel, Switzerland. Dietrich studied theology too.

He twice won Swiss Chess Championship at Schaffhausen 1907 (jointly with Paul Johner and Kunz) and at Montreux 1914 (jointly with Moriz Henneberger). He tied for 3rd-5th, behind Andreas Duhm and Solomon Rosenthal, at Heidelberg 1913, and won at Baden-Baden 1921 (the 3rd Badischen Kongress, quadrangular).
