= Tatjana Lematschko =

Swiss chess player (1948–2020)

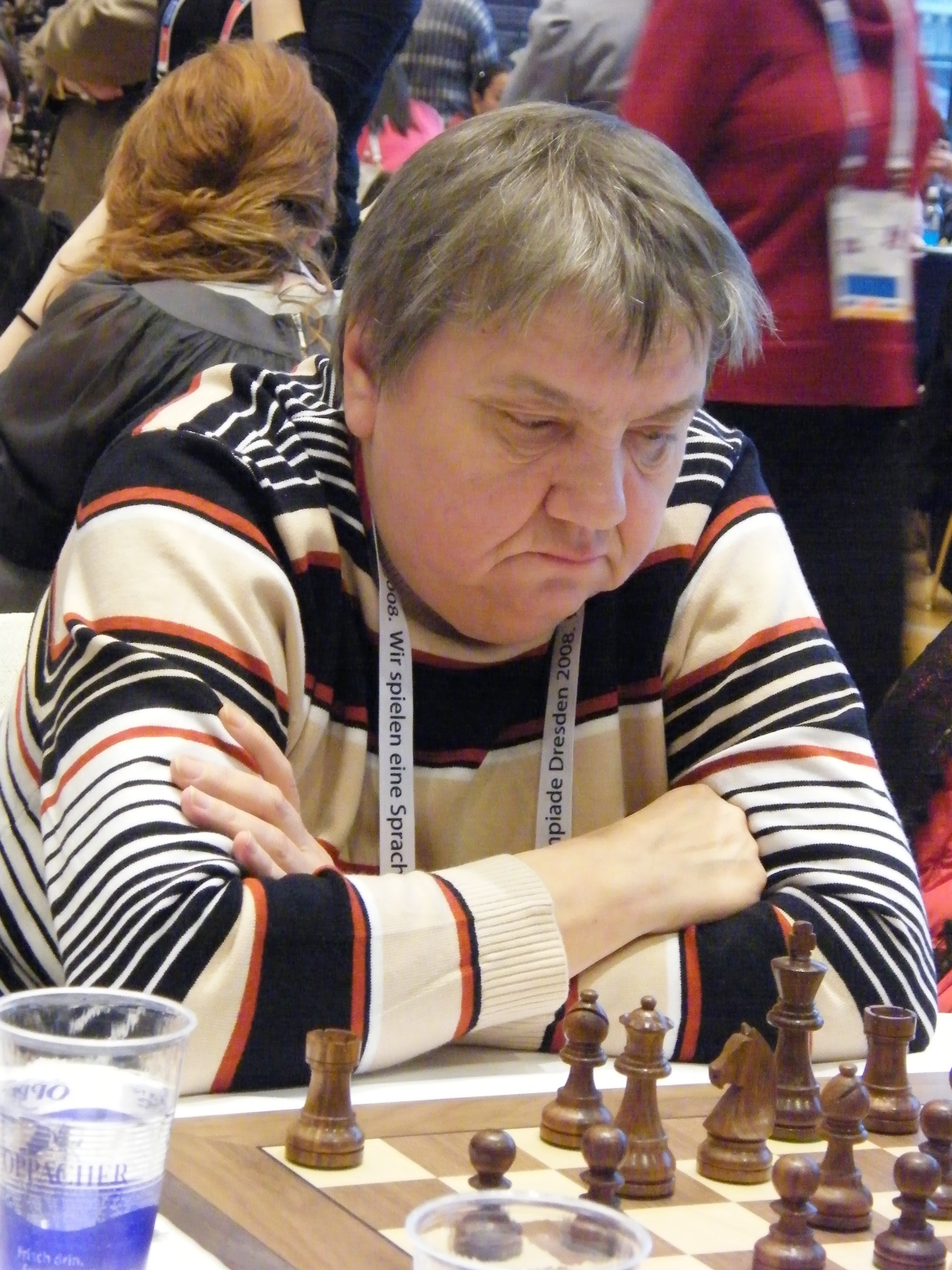
- Lematschko in 2008

Personal information
- Born: March 16, 1948 Moscow, Soviet Union
- Died: May 17, 2020 (aged 72) Zurich, Switzerland

Chess career
- Country: Switzerland (after 1983); Bulgaria (1974–1983); Soviet Union (before 1974)
- Title: Woman Grandmaster (1977)
- Peak rating: 2370 (January 1988)

Tatjana Lematschko (Russian: Татьяна Лемачко; March 16, 1948 – May 17, 2020) was a Soviet-born Swiss chess player, She was born in Moscow, but lived in Bulgaria for several years.

She won both the Women's Bulgarian Chess Championship and Swiss Chess Championship several times.

She has competed for the world championship, most recently in the Women's World Chess Championship 1999.

At the 27th Chess Olympiad she won a medal for the best performance on no. 1 board.

WGM Tatjana Lematschko died in Zurich, aged 72.
