= Bernhard Duhm =

German Lutheran theologian (1847–1928)

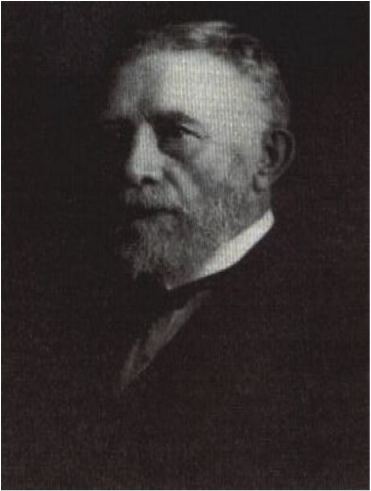
Bernhard Lauardus Duhm (1847-1928)

Bernhard Lauardus Duhm (October 10, 1847 – November 1, 1928) was a German Lutheran theologian, born in Bingum, today part of Leer, East Frisia. He was a member of the history of religions school.

== Early life and education ==
Duhm studied theology at the University of Göttingen, where he had as instructors Albrecht Ritschl (1822–1889), Heinrich Ewald (1803–1875) and Julius Wellhausen (1844–1918), with the latter becoming a good friend and colleague to Duhm. In 1873, he became a lecturer at the University of Göttingen and subsequently an associate professor of Old Testament studies (1877). In 1888, he relocated to the University of Basel, where he was one of the more influential Old Testament scholars of his time.

== Work ==
Duhm is remembered for his exegetical work on the prophets of the Old Testament, particularly studies dealing with the complexities of the Books of Jeremiah and Isaiah. He pioneered the theory of multiple authors of the Book of Isaiah and was the first to identify its servant songs as such. His commentary outlined the structure and content of Isaiah chapters 1-39 (called "First Isaiah" or "Isaiah of Jerusalem"). Duhm in the same commentary provides an in-depth analysis of Deutero-Isaiah or Deuterojesaja (Second Isaiah, chapters 40-55), and the so-called Tritojesaja (Third Isaiah, chapters 56-66).

== Servant songs ==
Duhm originated the concept of the Servant songs in the Book of Isaiah, identifying four of them in Isaiah's text; Isaiah 42:1-4; Isaiah 49:1-6; Isaiah 50:4-7; and Isaiah 52:13-53:12. Joseph Blenkinsopp summarizes Duhm's theories of the servant songs and their reception in modern academia;

His conclusions may be summarized as follows: the "Servant songs" were composed by a member of a Jewish community, but not of the diaspora, during the first half of the fifth century, between the composition of Job and Malachi; the author drew on Jeremiah, Deutero-Isaiah, and Job and in his turn influenced Trito-Isaiah and Malachi; the protagonist of the "songs" was a historical figure, a teacher of the law who suffered abuse, first of all from his own people; the "songs" are distinguished from their Deutero-Isaian context by a more deliberate and sober style, more regular prosody, and especially by the contrast with Deutero-Isaiah's description of Israel as ebed they originally formed one composition, together with editorial additions (42:5-7; 50:10-11); they were inserted into Deutero-Isaiah by a later hand wherever there was space on the papyrus copy. It would be safe to say that none of these conclusions would pass unchallenged today.

== Personal life ==
He was the father of three sons, Hans (1878-1946) Dietrich (1880-1940) and Andreas (1883-1975), all of whom were professional chess players. Bernhard Duhm died in Basel on November 1, 1928 as the result of car accident.

== Selected publications ==
- Die Theologie der Propheten als Grundlage für die innere Entwicklungsgeschichte der israelitischen Religion (The theology of the prophets as the basis for internal development of the Israelite religion), 1875.
- Das Buch Jesaia übersetzt und erklärt (The Book of Isaiah translated and explained), 1892.
- Das Buch Jeremia, (The Book of Jeremiah), 1901.
- Israels Propheten (Israel's prophets), 1922.
