= Monika Müller-Seps =

Swiss chess player (born 1986)

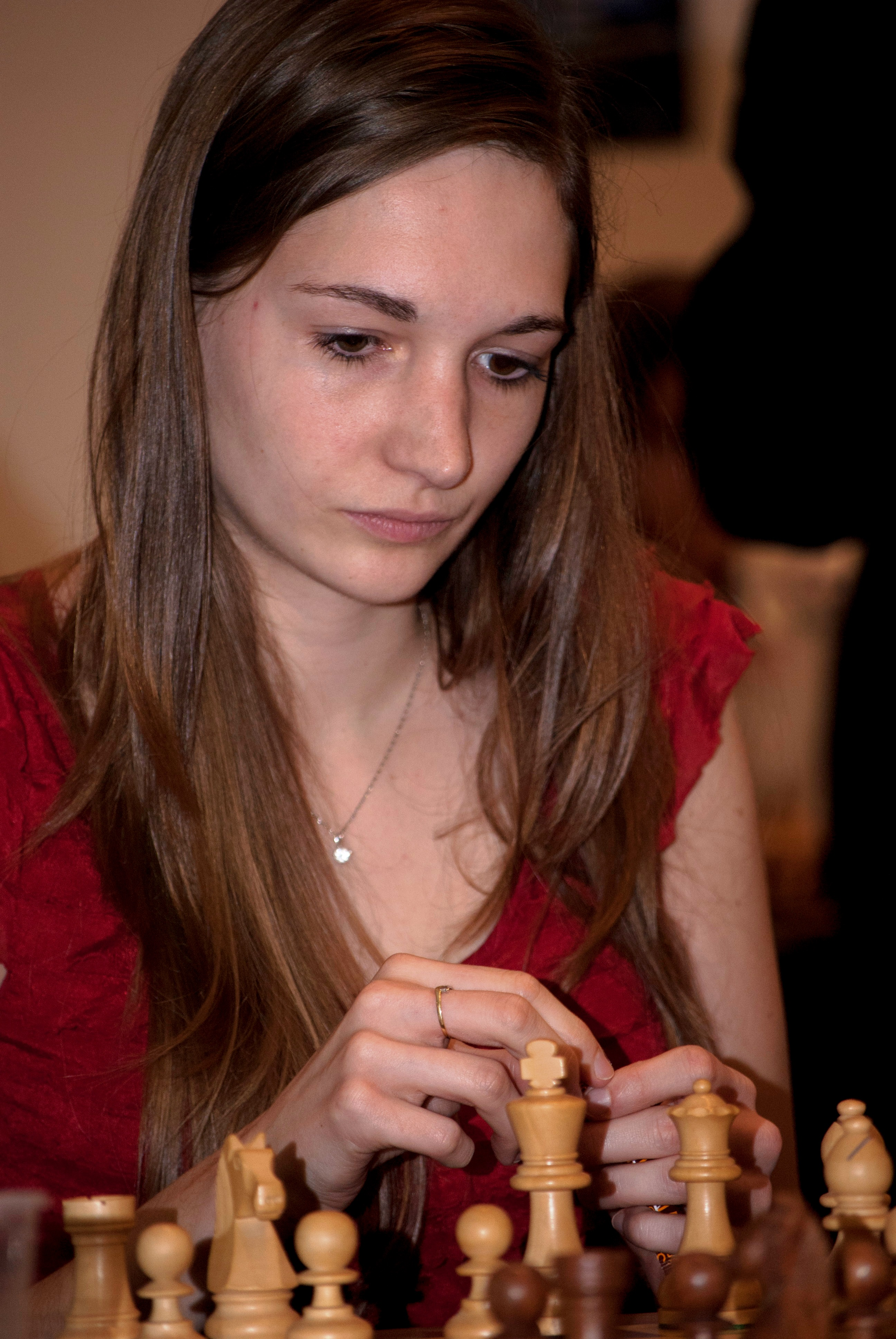
- Monika Müller-Seps in 2011

Personal information
- Born: 22 February 1986 (age 40) Zürich, Switzerland

Chess career
- Country: Switzerland
- Title: Woman Grandmaster (2014)
- Peak rating: 2290 (October 2007)

Monika Gabriela Müller-Sep (born 22 February 1986) is a Swiss chess player, Woman Grandmaster (2014), five time Swiss Women's Chess Championship winner (2001, 2002, 2005, 2007, 2012).

== Chess career ==
She is two-time Swiss chess champion among girls under 16 (1999, 2000). From 1997 to 2004, she represented Switzerland many times at the European Youth Chess Championships and World Youth Chess Championships in various age groups. She has competed many times in the individual finals of the Swiss Women's Chess Championships and won gold medals five times (2001, 2002, 2005, 2007, 2012). She is winner of three Swiss team chess championships: 2011 and 2013 with chess club Zürich Reti ASK, and 2016 with chess club "Schachgesellschaft Zürich". She also played for chess clubs Luzern SK and SG Winterthur. In 2008 she won the open chess tournament in Thun.

Monika Müller-Seps played for Switzerland in the Women's Chess Olympiads:

- In 2002, at third board in the 35th Chess Olympiad (women) in Bled (+5, =4, -2),
- In 2004, at first reserve board in the 36th Chess Olympiad (women) in Calvià (+5, =1, -5),
- In 2006, at second board in the 37th Chess Olympiad (women) in Turin (+5, =3, -3),
- In 2008, at second board in the 38th Chess Olympiad (women) in Dresden (+3, =2, -5),
- In 2010, at second board in the 39th Chess Olympiad (women) in Khanty-Mansiysk (+5, =2, -2),
- In 2012, at second board in the 40th Chess Olympiad (women) in Istanbul (+4, =1, -4),
- In 2014, at first board in the 41st Chess Olympiad (women) in Tromsø (+6, =2, -2),
- In 2016, at first board in the 42nd Chess Olympiad (women) in Baku (+3, =2, -5),
- In 2018, at second board in the 43rd Chess Olympiad (women) in Batumi (+4, =2, -0).

Monika Müller-Seps played for Switzerland in the European Women's Team Chess Championships:

- In 2003, at second board in the 5th European Team Chess Championship (women) in Plovdiv (+0, =2, -3),
- In 2005, at second board in the 6th European Team Chess Championship (women) in Gothenburg (+3, =1, -4),
- In 2007, at first board in the 7th European Team Chess Championship (women) in Heraklion (+2, =3, -3),
- In 2011, at first board in the 9th European Team Chess Championship (women) in Porto Carras (+1, =1, -6),
- In 2013, at first board in the 10th European Team Chess Championship (women) in Warsaw (+4, =2, -2),
- In 2015, at first board in the 11th European Team Chess Championship (women) in Reykjavík (+2, =1, -5).

In 2006, she was awarded the FIDE Women International Master (WIM) title and received the FIDE Women Grandmaster (WGM) title eight years later.

She achieved the highest Elo rating in her career so far on October 1, 2007, with a score of 2290 points, she was then ranked first among Swiss female chess players.

She graduated from ETH Zurich with a degree in neurobiology.
