= Hans Duhm =

German–Swiss chess player

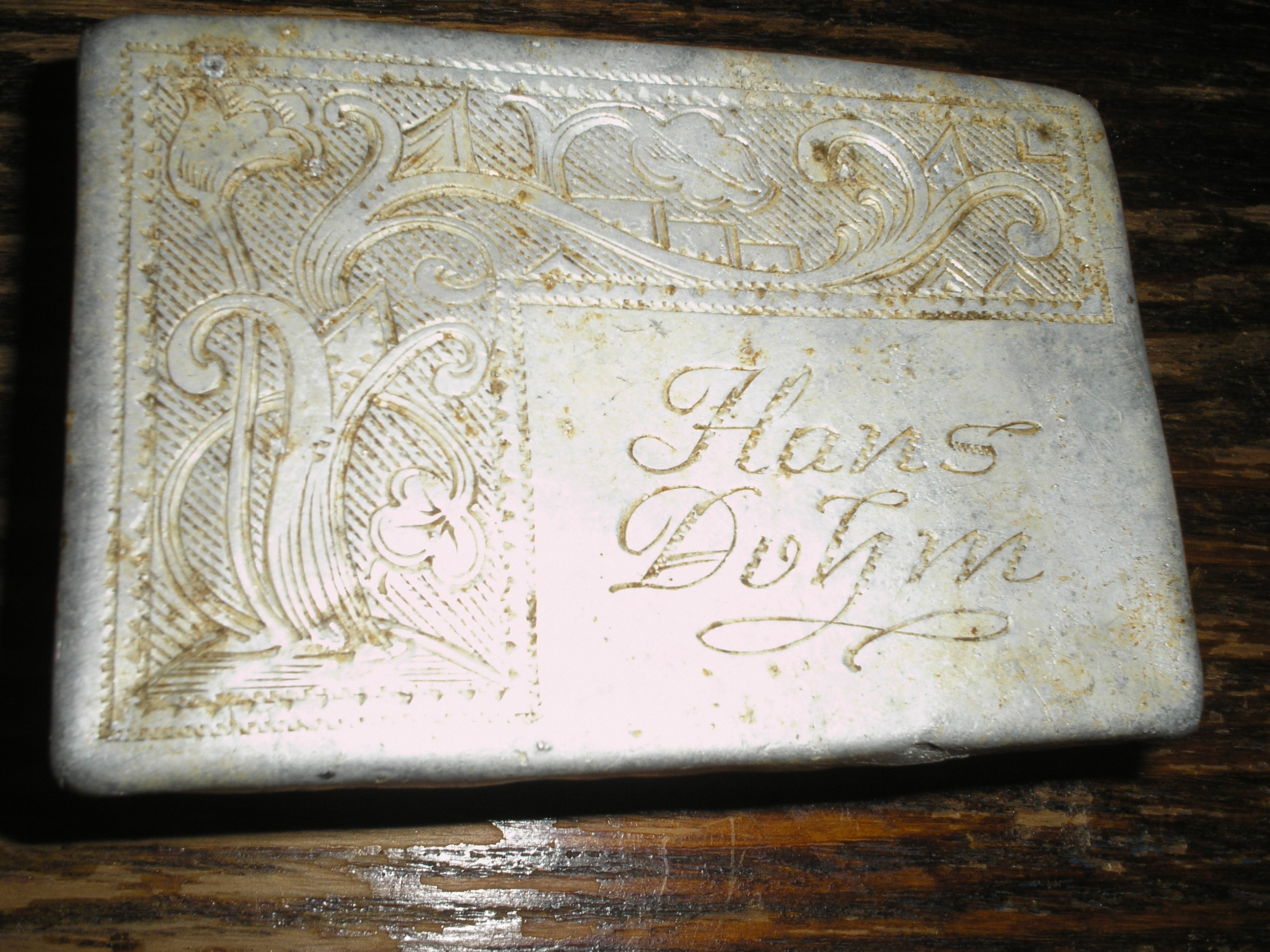
Hans Duhm

Hans Duhm (12 August 1878, Göttingen – 4 January 1946) was a German–Swiss chess master.

Born in Göttingen, Germany, he was the elder brother of Dietrich Duhm and Andreas Duhm. His father, Bernhard Duhm, was a professor for Protestant theology (Old Testament) in Göttingen and Basel, Switzerland. Hans studied theology too, graduated from the University of Strasbourg, Alsace (then German Empire), and received the Lizentiate degree (post graduate Doctorate). He published a theologian book Die bösen Geister im Alten Testament (Mohr Verlag, Tübingen und Leipzig 1904). He was a professor of Exegesis of the Old Testament in Göttingen and Breslau.

He shared 1st at St. Gallen 1901 (Swiss Chess Championship) and became a co-champion. He tied for 16-17th in the Mannheim 1914 chess tournament (the 19th DSB Congress, Hauptturnier A, Hallegua won), and tied for 7-8th at Hannover 1926 (Aron Nimzowitsch won). Dr. Hans Duhm was five-time Lower Saxony Champion (Der Niedersächsische Schachverband, 1924, 1925, 1927, 1928, and 1929).
