= Moriz Henneberger =

Swiss chess player

Moriz Henneberger (16 October 1878, Bümpliz – 7 April 1959, Basel) was a Swiss chess master and chess composer.

He was Swiss Champion in 1899, 1906 (jointly), 1909, 1911 (jointly), and 1914 (jointly).

He played for Switzerland in the 2nd Chess Olympiad at The Hague 1928.
