= Laura Stoeri =

Swiss chess player (born 1996)

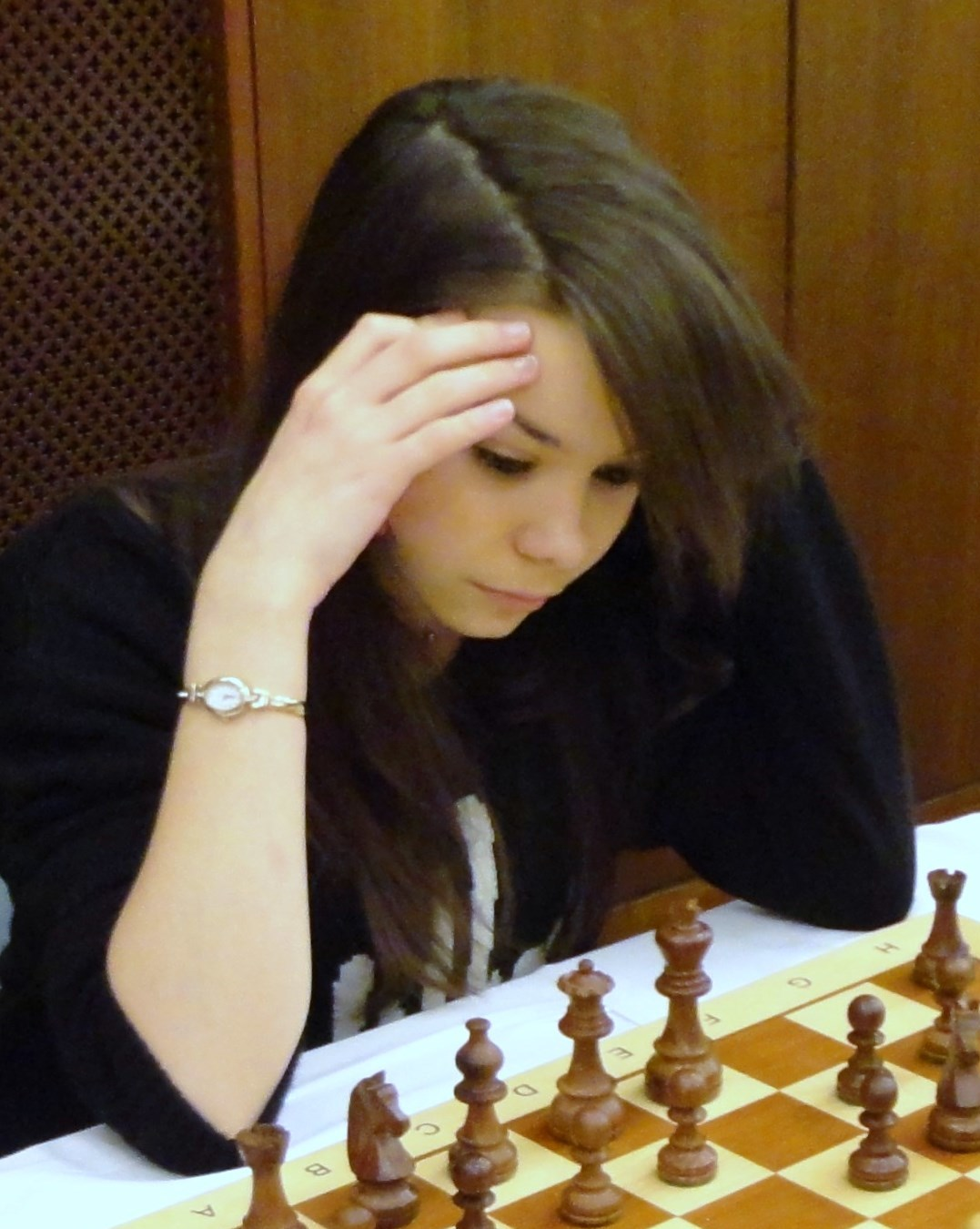
- Laura Stoeri in 2014

Personal information
- Born: 30 July 1996 (age 29)

Chess career
- Country: Switzerland
- Title: Woman FIDE Master (2013)
- Peak rating: 2169 (October 2014)

Laura Stoeri (born 30 July 1996) is a Swiss chess player, Woman FIDE Master (2013), Swiss Women's Chess Championship winner (2016).

== Chess career ==
As a youth, Laura Stoeri was trained by, among others, Chess Grandmaster Artur Yusupov. She has competed many times in the individual finals of the Swiss Women's Chess Championships and won gold medal in 2016 in Flims.

In the Swiss National League A Laura Stoeri played for the Club d'Echecs de Genève and for the Club d'échecs de Neuchâtel. She is a member of the Club d'échecs de Payerne, with whom she played in the Swiss Bundesliga in the 2019/20 season. In the French Top 12, the highest French league, she played for Club de L'Echiquier Chalonnais and in the British Four Nations Chess she played for League for Cheddleton.

Laura Stoeri played for Switzerland in the Women's Chess Olympiads:

- In 2012, at reserve board in the 40th Chess Olympiad (women) in Istanbul (+3, =1, -4),
- In 2014, at reserve board in the 41st Chess Olympiad (women) in Tromsø (+6, =1, -3),
- In 2016, at reserve board in the 42nd Chess Olympiad (women) in Baku (+3, =3, -1),
- In 2018, at reserve board in the 43rd Chess Olympiad (women) in Batumi (+6, =1, -2),
- In 2022, at fourth board in the 44th Chess Olympiad (women) in Chennai (+4, =3, -2).

Laura Stoeri played for Switzerland in the European Women's Team Chess Championships:

- In 2011, at fourth board in the 9th European Team Chess Championship (women) in Porto Carras (+2, =2, -4),
- In 2013, at third board in the 10th European Team Chess Championship (women) in Warsaw (+4, =0, -5),
- In 2015, at fourth board in the 11th European Team Chess Championship (women) in Reykjavík (+1, =1, -4),
- In 2017, at fourth board in the 12th European Team Chess Championship (women) in Crete (+4, =2, -3),
- In 2021, at third board in the 14th European Team Chess Championship (women) in Čatež ob Savi (+2, =1, -3).
