= Oskar Naegeli =

Swiss chess player and dermatologist

Personal information
- Born: 25 January 1885 Ermatingen, Switzerland
- Died: 16 November 1959 (aged 74) Fribourg, Switzerland

Chess career
- Country: Switzerland

Oskar Naegeli (25 January 1885 in Ermatingen – 16 November 1959 in Fribourg), was a Swiss chess player and dermatologist. He represented Switzerland at the Chess Olympiads in 1927, 1928, 1931 and 1935, as well as at the unofficial Olympiad in 1936 at Munich.

Naegeli won twice Swiss Chess Championship (1910 and 1936). He lost a match to Ossip Bernstein (1 : 3) in 1932, and to Salo Flohr (2 : 4) in 1933. He participated in the strong international tournaments at Berne 1932 and Zurich 1934, both won by Alexander Alekhine. He was the brother of Otto Naegeli and is a great-uncle of Harald Naegeli.

In the field of dermatology, the Naegeli syndrome is named after him.
