= Fatos =

Fatos is an Albanian masculine given name, which means "daring", "brave" or "valiant". The name may refer to:

- Fatos Arapi (1930–2018), Albanian poet
- Fatos Beja (born 1948), Albanian politician
- Fatos Bećiraj (born 1988), Albanian-Montenegrin footballer
- Fatos Daja (born 1968), Albanian footballer
- Fatos Hoxha (born 1961), Albanian politician
- Fatos Kongoli (born 1944), Albanian writer
- Fatos Lala (born 1995), Albanian footballer
- Fatos Lubonja (born 1951), Albanian writer
- Fatos Muço (born 1949), Albanian chess player
- Fatos Nano (1952–2025), Albanian politician and prime minister
- Fatos Omari, Albanian chess player
- Fatos Pilkati (born 1951), Albanian sports shooter
- Fatos Tarifa (born 1954), Albanian diplomat
