= Konçi =

Konçi is an Albanian surname. Notable people with the surname include:

- Eqrem Konçi (1937–1997), Albanian chess master
- Mira Konçi (born 1973), Albanian singer and songwriter
- Zyber Konçi (1927–2015), Albanian football coach
