= Nóbrega =

Nóbrega is a surname and may refer to:

- Adaucto Nóbrega (born 1939), Brazilian chess master
- Ana Nóbrega (born 1980), Brazilian Christian singer and songwriter
- Braulio Nóbrega (born 1985), Spanish footballer
- Ana Sofia Nóbrega (born 1990), Angolan swimmer
- Antonio Nóbrega (born 1952), Brazilian singer, dancer and actor
- Francisco Nóbrega (born 1942), Portuguese footballer
