= Ylvi Pustina =

Albanian chess player (1935–2018)

Personal information
- Born: 19 February 1935 Tirana, Albania
- Died: February 15, 2018 (aged 82)

Chess career
- Country: Albania

Ylvi Pustina (19 February 1935 – 15 February 2018) was an Albanian chess player, nine-time Albanian Chess Championship winner.

== Biography ==
From the begin 1950s to the begin 1970s, Ylvi Pustina was one of Albania's leading chess players. He nine time won Albanian Chess Championship: in 1952 (together with Bujar Hoxha), 1957, 1959, 1960, 1961, 1964, 1965, 1969 and 1970. Only Fatos Muço has more Albanian chess champion titles than Ylvi Pustina.

Ylvi Pustina played for Albania in the Chess Olympiads:

- In 1960, at first board in the 14th Chess Olympiad in Leipzig (+7, =5, -8),
- In 1962, at first board in the 15th Chess Olympiad in Varna (+5, =5, -6),
- In 1970, at first board in the 19th Chess Olympiad in Siegen (+3, =9, -4),
- In 1972, at first board in the 20th Chess Olympiad in Skopje (+2, =5, -0),
- In 1980, at third board in the 24th Chess Olympiad in La Valletta (+2, =3, -2),
- In 2000, at fourth board in the 34th Chess Olympiad in Istanbul (+0, =6, -3).

Ylvi Pustina played for Albania in the European Team Chess Championship preliminaries:

- In 1977, at third board in the 6th European Team Chess Championship in Moscow (+0, =1, -2).

Ylvi Pustina played for Albania in the World Student Team Chess Championships:

- In 1958, at first board in the 5th World Student Team Chess Championship in Varna (+1, =4, -5).

Ylvi Pustina played for Albania in the Men's Chess Balkaniads:

- In 1980, at third board in the 12th Chess Balkaniad in Istanbul (+0, =3, -2).

In 1999 and 2007 he participated in World Senior Chess Championships.
