= Seitaj =

Seitaj is a surname. Notable people with the surname include:

- Aleksandër Seitaj (born 1991), Albanian drag queen
- Ilir Seitaj (born 1957), Albanian chess International Master
