= Albanian Chess Championship =

National chess competition in Albania

The Albanian Chess Championship is the annual individual national chess championship of Albania. The first tournament took place in 1933. A separate championship for women has been held since 1977.

== Winners ==
Year	Champion	Women's Champion
1933	Xhaferr Çaushi	
1946	Gaspër Shoshi	
1947	Sotir Qirjaku	
1948	Skënder Çarçani; Teodor Siliqi	
1949	Skënder Çarçani	
1950	Skënder Çarçani; Sotir Qirjaku	
1951	Bujar Hoxha	
1952	Bujar Hoxha; Ylvi Pustina	
1953	Mendim Veizaj	
1954	Esat Duraku	
1955	Esat Duraku	
1956	Esat Duraku	
1957	Ylvi Pustina	
1958	Esat Duraku	
1959	Ylvi Pustina	
1960	Ylvi Pustina	
1961	Ylvi Pustina	
1962	Florian Vila	
1963	Esat Duraku	
1964	Ylvi Pustina	
1965	Ylvi Pustina	
1966	Vangjel Adhami	
1967	Eqrem Konçi	
1968	Fatos Omari	
1969	Ylvi Pustina	
1970	Ylvi Pustina	
1971	Vangjel Adhami	
1972	Vangjel Adhami	
1973	Florian Vila	
1974	Fatos Muço	
1975	Llambi Qendro	
1976	Fatos Muço	
1977	Fatos Muço	Leonora Shllaku
1978	Fatos Muço	Teuta Manjani
1979	Fatos Muço	Teuta Manjani
1980	Fatos Muço	Liri Bajo
1981	Fatos Muço	Liri Bajo
1982	Fatos Muço	Vega Paja
1983	Ilir Seitaj	Ylvije Boriçi
1984	Fatos Muço	Albana Vuji
1985	Vangjel Adhami	Albana Vuji
1986	Ilir Karkanaqe	Ylvije Boriçi
1987	Fatos Muço	Ylvije Boriçi
1988	Llambi Qendro	Ylvije Boriçi
1989	Fatos Muço	Albana Vuji
1990	Shkëlqim Çela	Rozana Gjergji
1991	Ilir Seitaj	Rozana Gjergji
1992	Altin Çela	Valbona Bramo
1993	Luan Elezi	Valbona Bramo
1994	Aldo Zadrima	Eglantina Shabanaj
1995	Anton Gurakuqi	Eglantina Shabanaj
1996	Erald Dervishi	Eglantina Shabanaj
1997	Erald Dervishi	Eglantina Shabanaj
1998	Zeqir Sula	Eglantina Shabanaj
1999	Ilir Seitaj	Eglantina Shabanaj
2000	Vangjel Adhami	not played
2001	Lorenc Rama	Rozana Gjergji
2002	Lorenc Rama	Arta Alushi Driza
2003	Luca Shytaj	Alda Shabanaj
2004	Lorenc Rama	Rozana Gjergji
2005	Ilir Karkanaqe	Roela Pasku
2006	Dritan Mehmeti	Roela Pasku
2007	Dritan Mehmeti	Eglantina Shabanaj
2008	Lorenc Rama	Roela Pasku
2009	Ilir Seitaj	Eglantina Shabanaj
2010	Lorenc Rama	Rozana Gjergji
2011	Saimir Shabanaj	Eglantina Shabanaj
2012	Llambi Pasko	Eglantina Shabanaj
2013	Dritan Mehmeti	Rozana Gjergji
2014	Dritan Mehmeti	Eglantina Shabanaj
2015	Franc Ashiku	Alda Shabanaj
2016	Dritan Mehmeti	Eglantina Shabanaj
2017	Llambi Pasko	Alda Shabanaj
2018	Llambi Pasko	Eglantina Shabanaj
2019	Franc Ashiku	Eglantina Shabanaj
2020	Franc Ashiku	Rozana Gjergji
2021	Llambi Pasko	Kler Çaku
2022	Llambi Pasko	Klean Shuqja
2023	Franc Ashiku	Kler Çaku
2024	Llambi Pasko	Klean Shuqja
2025	Mehmeti Dritan	Klean Shuqja

== Open champions by number of titles ==
Player	Number of Titles
Fatos Muço	11
Ylvi Pustina	9
Llambi Pasko, Dritan Mehmeti	6
Vangjel Adhami, Esat Duraku, Lorenc Rama,	5
Ilir Seitaj, Franc Ashiku	4
Skënder Çarçani	3
Bujar Hoxha, Erald Dervishi, Ilir Karkanaqe, Llambi Qendro, Sotir Qirjaku, Florian Vila	2
Xhaferr Çaushi, Altin Çela, Shkëlqim Çela, Luan Elezi, Anton Gurakuqi, Eqerem Konçi, Fatos Omari, Saimir Shabanaj, Gaspër Shoshi, Luca Shytaj, Teodor Siliqi, Zeqir Sula, Mendim Veizaj, Aldo Zadrima	1

== Women's champions by number of titles ==
Player	Number of Titles
Eglantina Shabanaj	14
Rozana Gjergji (Çima)	7
Ylvije Boriçi	4
Albana Vuji, Roela Pasku, Alda Shabanaj, Klean Shuqja	3
Liri Bajo, Valbona Bramo, Teuta Manjani, Kler Çaku	2
Arta Driza, Vega Paja, Leonora Shllaku	1

== Albanian clubs championship ==
1969	Dinamo Tiranë
1970	17 Nëntori Tiranë (nowadays Sportklub T.)
1971	Dinamo Tiranë
1972	Partizani Tiranë
1973	Studenti Tiranë
1974	Lokomotiva Durrës (nowadays Teuta)
1975	17 Nëntori Tiranë (nowadays Sportklub T.)
1976	Dajti Tiranë
1977	17 Nëntori Tiranë (nowadays Sportklub T.)
1978	Dajti Tiranë
1979	Dajti Tiranë
1980	Lokomotiva Durrës (nowadays Teuta)
1981	Lokomotiva Durrës (nowadays Teuta)
1982	Lokomotiva Durrës (nowadays Teuta)
1983	Dajti Tiranë
1984	Dajti Tiranë
1985	Lokomotiva Durrës (nowadays Teuta)
1986	Dinamo Tiranë
1987	Partizani Tiranë
1988	17 Nëntori Tiranë (nowadays Sportklub T.)
1989	17 Nëntori Tiranë (nowadays Sportklub T.)
1990	Dajti Tiranë
1991	Teuta Durrës (former Lokomotiva)
1992	not played
1993	not played
1994	not played
1995	not played
1996	Teuta Durrës (former Lokomotiva)
1997	not played
1998	Partizani Tiranë
1999	Studenti Tiranë
2000	Dinamo Tiranë
2001	Studenti Tiranë
2002	Studenti Tiranë
2003	Studenti Tiranë
2004	Studenti Tiranë
2005	Butrinti Sarandë
2006	Luftëtari Gjirokastër
2007	Butrinti Sarandë
2008	Vllaznia Shkodër
2009	Butrinti Sarandë
2010	Veleçiku Koplik
2011	Teuta Durrës
2012	Teuta Durrës
2013	Butrinti Sarandë
2014	Naftëtari Kuçovë
2015	Butrinti Sarandë
2016	Naftëtari Kuçovë (open)
2017	Naftëtari Kuçovë (open)
2018	Naftëtari Kuçovë
2019	Tirana
2020	Tirana
2021	Tirana
2022	Butrinti Sarandë
2023	Butrinti Sarandë
2024	Partizani Tiranë
2025	Tirana

== Albanian women clubs championship ==
1983	Vllaznia Shkodër
1984	Lokomotiva Durrës (nowadays Teuta)
1985	not played
1986	Vllaznia Shkodër
1987	Vllaznia Shkodër
1988	Partizani Tiranë
1989	Vllaznia Shkodër
1990	Vllaznia Shkodër
1991	Dajti Tiranë
2024	Teuta Durrës
2025	Tirana

National Spartakiadas

Year	Men	Women
1979	Dajti Tiranë	-
1984	Lokomotiva Durrës (nowadays Teuta)	Vllaznia Shkodër
1989	Lokomotiva Durrës (nowadays Teuta)	Vllaznia Shkodër

- List of winners with respective teams included
