= 19th Chess Olympiad =

1970 chess tournament in Siegen, West Germany

Official Logo of the Siegen Olympiad

The 19th Chess Olympiad (German: Die 19. Schacholympiade), comprising an open team tournament as well as the annual FIDE congress, took place between September 5–27, 1970, in Siegen, West Germany.

The Soviet team with six Grandmasters, led by world champion Boris Spassky, lived up to expectations and won their tenth consecutive gold medal, although only by a single point, with Hungary and Yugoslavia taking the silver and bronze, respectively.

== Tournament report ==
Held at the Siegerland Hall venue, a total of 64 nations applied to enter the tournament. Unfortunately, space constraints and FIDE's intended model format meant that only 60 could be accommodated. It was then found that four teams were to have their applications rejected on the grounds that they had missed the deadline. These four teams were: Argentina, France, Ecuador, and Venezuela. When Panama withdrew their application, Argentina took their place.

The tournament was run as a two-stage round-robin. Six preliminary groups of 10 teams each determined the composition of five Finals of 12 teams each, with the top two from each group ending up in Final A etc. Several unsatisfactory aspects of this system were voiced, however, and they manifested themselves in a variety of ways.

Firstly, the pressure was raised to fever pitch at a very early stage in the proceedings. A single poor result in the preliminaries could condemn a team to a low final group. All this proved too much for England's top player, Jonathan Penrose, who in his crucial last-round preliminary match, blundered a piece and fainted from the shock. A nervous player at the best of times, he was retired from the rest of the contest on medical grounds and England ended up in Group C, below their seeding, which they then went on to win by a hefty margin.

The Sunday Times reported several instances of cheating. For example, in the Indonesia versus Switzerland preliminary match, a player moved his queen next to the opponent's king with check. Capturing the queen with the king was forced and so the player made the move for his opponent, declaring stalemate and shaking hands all in one movement. His dazed opponent ended up signing the scoresheet before recovering his wits and realizing (too late) that it was not a stalemate at all.

It was possible for strong teams, sitting comfortably in favourable qualification spots, to not try as hard as they might have in other circumstances. Such actions could influence the qualification process below them and, as a deliberate ploy, could have assisted in assigning a strong rival to a lower final group.

Then there was the whole question of apartheid. Albania decided to forfeit their game against South Africa as a protest against racial segregation and so lost 4–0. Naturally, this meant that the whole group dynamic was lost and the resulting placings somewhat distorted. Some teams and a small number of strong players did not compete at all as a protest against the participation of the South African team.

The teams competed for the Hamilton-Russell Cup. Matches were scored by game points, with match points being used in the event of a tie-break. The Chief Referee was International Arbiter Harry de Graaf. A total of 360 players took part, including 35 grandmasters and 66 international masters.

Spassky versus Fischer

As was customary, the FIDE congress was also held during the Olympiad and the major news concerned the retirement of President Folke Rogard after 21 years of service. He was to be replaced by former World Champion Max Euwe and this appeared to be a universally popular decision. Another important issue was the presentation of a proposed new system for the awarding GM and IM titles; the congress adopted in full the report submitted by a committee comprising top player Svetozar Gligorić, Professor Arpad Elo and FIDE Vice President Mr. Dorazil.

The tournament was very well attended by the public, particularly on the day that current World Champion Boris Spassky played future champion Bobby Fischer, with an estimated 3000 spectators turning up (Spassky won).

== Individual performances ==
World Champion Boris Spassky took the best score on board one (79.17%) and won a suit as a prize. Bobby Fischer finished a close second with 76.9% and Bent Larsen a close third with 76.5%.

Tigran Petrosian extended his amazing run of unbeaten Olympiad games to 90 (won 58, drawn 32).

Viktor Korchnoi lost only one game - as a result of oversleeping he defaulted to the Spaniard, Díez del Corral. There was no satisfactory explanation as to why (non-playing) team captain Paul Keres or one of Korchnoi's teammates could not have telephoned his room when noticing he was a few minutes late.

Oscar Panno drew a record 15 games; however this may be partially explained by his accommodation. Siegen was a small place and many competitors were housed in the surrounding area. When Korchnoi asked Panno where he was living, his reply was "in a pure field".

== Results ==
=== Preliminaries ===
Preliminary head-to-head results were carried over to the finals, so no teams met more than once. All preliminary groups and finals were played as round-robin tournaments. The results were as follows:

- Group 1:

| № | Country | 1 | 2 | 3 | 4 | 5 | 6 | 7 | 8 | 9 | 10 | + | − | = | Points |
|---|---|---|---|---|---|---|---|---|---|---|---|---|---|---|---|
| «A» | Soviet Union | - | 3 | 3 | 3 | 3 | 3 | 4 | 4 | 4 | 4 | 9 | 0 | 0 | 31 |
| «A» | Spain | 1 | - | 2 | 2½ | 3½ | 4 | 3½ | 4 | 4 | 4 | 7 | 1 | 1 | 28½ |
| «B» | Poland | 1 | 2 | - | 3 | 2 | 1½ | 3½ | 3 | 4 | 4 | 5 | 2 | 2 | 24 |
| «B» | Australia | 1 | 1½ | 1 | - | 3 | 3½ | 2 | 3 | 4 | 4 | 5 | 3 | 1 | 23 |
| «C» | Tunisia | 1 | ½ | 2 | 1 | - | 1 | 2 | 4 | 3 | 3½ | 3 | 4 | 2 | 18 |
| «C» | Greece | 1 | 0 | 2½ | ½ | 3 | - | 1½ | 2½ | 2½ | 4 | 5 | 4 | 0 | 17½ |
| «D» | Peru | 0 | ½ | ½ | 2 | 2 | 2½ | - | 2 | 4 | 4 | 3 | 3 | 3 | 17½ |
| «D» | Dominican Republic | 0 | 0 | 1 | 1 | 0 | 1½ | 2 | - | 2 | 3½ | 1 | 6 | 2 | 11 |
| «E» | Faroe Islands | 0 | 0 | 0 | 0 | 1 | 1½ | 0 | 2 | - | 4 | 1 | 7 | 1 | 8½ |
| «E» | Monaco | 0 | 0 | 0 | 0 | ½ | 0 | 0 | ½ | 0 | - | 0 | 9 | 0 | 1 |

- Group 2:

| № | Country | 1 | 2 | 3 | 4 | 5 | 6 | 7 | 8 | 9 | 10 | + | − | = | Points |
|---|---|---|---|---|---|---|---|---|---|---|---|---|---|---|---|
| «A» | Yugoslavia | - | 2½ | 3½ | 4 | 2½ | 3½ | 3½ | 4 | 4 | 4 | 9 | 0 | 0 | 31½ |
| «A» | Canada | 1½ | - | 1 | 2 | 3 | 2½ | 2½ | 3 | 3½ | 4 | 6 | 2 | 1 | 23 |
| «B» | Indonesia | ½ | 3 | - | 1½ | 1 | 3½ | 2½ | 4 | 2½ | 4 | 6 | 3 | 0 | 22½ |
| «B» | Mongolia | 0 | 2 | 2½ | - | 2 | 2½ | 2½ | 4 | 3½ | 3 | 6 | 1 | 2 | 22 |
| «C» | England | 1½ | 1 | 3 | 2 | - | 2 | 2 | 3 | 3 | 4 | 4 | 2 | 3 | 21½ |
| «C» | Iran | ½ | 1½ | ½ | 1½ | 2 | - | 2 | 4 | 4 | 3½ | 3 | 4 | 2 | 19½ |
| «D» | Switzerland | ½ | 1½ | 1½ | 1½ | 2 | 2 | - | 2½ | 3 | 4 | 3 | 4 | 2 | 18½ |
| «D» | Luxembourg | 0 | 1 | 0 | 0 | 1 | 0 | 1½ | - | 3 | 2 | 1 | 7 | 1 | 8½ |
| «E» | Andorra | 0 | ½ | 1½ | ½ | 1 | 0 | 1 | 1 | - | 2 | 0 | 8 | 1 | 7½ |
| «E» | Hong Kong | 0 | 0 | 0 | 1 | 0 | ½ | 0 | 2 | 2 | - | 0 | 7 | 2 | 5½ |

- Group 3:

| № | Country | 1 | 2 | 3 | 4 | 5 | 6 | 7 | 8 | 9 | 10 | + | − | = | Points |
|---|---|---|---|---|---|---|---|---|---|---|---|---|---|---|---|
| «A» | East Germany | - | 2½ | 3 | 3 | 2½ | 3½ | 4 | 4 | 4 | 4 | 9 | 0 | 0 | 30½ |
| «A» | United States | 1½ | - | 2 | 3 | 2½ | 4 | 4 | 4 | 3½ | 4 | 7 | 1 | 1 | 28½ |
| «B» | Netherlands | 1 | 2 | - | 2 | 3½ | 4 | 3½ | 4 | 4 | 4 | 6 | 1 | 2 | 28 |
| «B» | Finland | 1 | 1 | 2 | - | 1 | 2 | 4 | 4 | 3½ | 4 | 4 | 3 | 2 | 22½ |
| «C» | Belgium | 1½ | 1½ | ½ | 3 | - | 2 | 1½ | 3 | 2½ | 3½ | 4 | 4 | 1 | 19 |
| «C» | Brazil | ½ | 0 | 0 | 2 | 2 | - | 2½ | 2½ | 3½ | 4 | 4 | 3 | 2 | 17 |
| «D» | Mexico | 0 | 0 | ½ | 0 | 2½ | 1½ | - | 2 | 2 | 3½ | 2 | 5 | 2 | 12 |
| «D» | Japan | 0 | 0 | 0 | 0 | 1 | 1½ | 2 | - | 3½ | 4 | 2 | 6 | 1 | 12 |
| «E» | Turkey | 0 | ½ | 0 | ½ | 1½ | ½ | 2 | ½ | - | 3 | 1 | 7 | 1 | 8½ |
| «E» | United States Virgin Islands | 0 | 0 | 0 | 0 | ½ | 0 | ½ | 0 | 1 | - | 0 | 9 | 0 | 2 |

- Group 4:

| № | Country | 1 | 2 | 3 | 4 | 5 | 6 | 7 | 8 | 9 | 10 | + | − | = | Points |
|---|---|---|---|---|---|---|---|---|---|---|---|---|---|---|---|
| «A» | Romania | - | 1½ | 1½ | 3 | 2½ | 2½ | 3½ | 4 | 4 | 4 | 7 | 2 | 0 | 26½ |
| «A» | Hungary | 2½ | - | 2½ | 2½ | 2 | 2½ | 2½ | 3½ | 4 | 4 | 8 | 0 | 1 | 26 |
| «B» | Denmark | 2½ | 1½ | - | 2 | 3½ | 2½ | 2 | 3½ | 4 | 4 | 6 | 1 | 2 | 25½ |
| «B» | Sweden | 1 | 1½ | 2 | - | 2½ | 1½ | 2 | 3½ | 4 | 4 | 4 | 3 | 2 | 22 |
| «C» | Philippines | 1½ | 2 | ½ | 1½ | - | 2½ | 2½ | 3½ | 3½ | 4 | 5 | 3 | 1 | 21½ |
| «C» | Italy | 1½ | 1½ | 1½ | 2½ | 1½ | - | 2 | 3½ | 4 | 3½ | 4 | 4 | 1 | 21½ |
| «D» | Ireland | ½ | 1½ | 2 | 2 | 1½ | 2 | - | 3 | 3 | 3½ | 3 | 3 | 3 | 19 |
| «D» | Lebanon | 0 | ½ | ½ | ½ | ½ | ½ | 1 | - | 1½ | 3 | 1 | 8 | 0 | 8 |
| «E» | Morocco | 0 | 0 | 0 | 0 | ½ | 0 | 1 | 2½ | - | 3½ | 2 | 7 | 0 | 7½ |
| «E» | Guernsey | 0 | 0 | 0 | 0 | 0 | ½ | ½ | 1 | ½ | - | 0 | 9 | 0 | 2½ |

- Group 5:

| № | Country | 1 | 2 | 3 | 4 | 5 | 6 | 7 | 8 | 9 | 10 | + | − | = | Points |
|---|---|---|---|---|---|---|---|---|---|---|---|---|---|---|---|
| «A» | Argentina | - | 2 | 2½ | 2 | 2½ | 3½ | 3½ | 2½ | 4 | 3½ | 7 | 0 | 2 | 26 |
| «A» | Czechoslovakia | 2 | - | 2½ | 2 | 2 | 3½ | 2 | 4 | 4 | 3½ | 5 | 0 | 4 | 25½ |
| «B» | Israel | 1½ | 1½ | - | 2 | 2½ | 3½ | 2½ | 3½ | 4 | 3½ | 6 | 2 | 1 | 24½ |
| «B» | Cuba | 2 | 2 | 2 | - | 2½ | 3 | 3 | 2½ | 3 | 2½ | 6 | 0 | 3 | 22½ |
| «C» | Norway | 1½ | 2 | 1½ | 1½ | - | 2 | 4 | 3 | 3 | 3½ | 4 | 3 | 2 | 22 |
| «C» | Scotland | ½ | ½ | ½ | 1 | 2 | - | 4 | 3 | 3 | 4 | 4 | 4 | 1 | 18½ |
| «D» | Singapore | ½ | 2 | 1½ | 1 | 0 | 0 | - | 2 | 3½ | 3½ | 2 | 5 | 2 | 14 |
| «D» | Portugal | 1½ | 0 | ½ | 1½ | 1 | 1 | 2 | - | 2½ | 4 | 2 | 6 | 1 | 14 |
| «E» | Malta | 0 | 0 | 0 | 1 | 1 | 1 | ½ | 1½ | - | 3 | 1 | 8 | 0 | 8 |
| «E» | Rhodesia | ½ | ½ | ½ | 1½ | ½ | 0 | ½ | 0 | 1 | - | 0 | 9 | 0 | 5 |

- Group 6:

| № | Country | 1 | 2 | 3 | 4 | 5 | 6 | 7 | 8 | 9 | 10 | + | − | = | Points |
|---|---|---|---|---|---|---|---|---|---|---|---|---|---|---|---|
| «A» | West Germany | - | 2 | 3½ | 3 | 3 | 4 | 3½ | 3 | 3½ | 4 | 8 | 0 | 1 | 29½ |
| «A» | Bulgaria | 2 | - | 2½ | 3½ | 2 | 3 | 3½ | 4 | 3½ | 4 | 7 | 0 | 2 | 28 |
| «B» | Austria | ½ | 1½ | - | 2 | 2½ | 4 | 4 | 1½ | 2½ | 3 | 5 | 3 | 1 | 21½ |
| «B» | Colombia | 1 | ½ | 2 | - | 2½ | 2½ | 3½ | 2 | 3½ | 3 | 5 | 2 | 2 | 20½ |
| «C» | Iceland | 1 | 2 | 1½ | 1½ | - | 2 | 2½ | 3 | 1½ | 4 | 3 | 4 | 2 | 19 |
| «C» | Puerto Rico | 0 | 1 | 0 | 1½ | 2 | - | 2½ | 2½ | 3 | 3½ | 4 | 4 | 1 | 16 |
| «D» | South Africa | ½ | ½ | 0 | ½ | 1½ | 1½ | - | 4 | 1½ | 4 | 2 | 7 | 0 | 14 |
| «D» | Albania | 1 | 0 | 2½ | 2 | 1 | 1½ | 0 | - | 2½ | 3 | 3 | 5 | 1 | 13½ |
| «E» | New Zealand | ½ | ½ | 1½ | ½ | 2½ | 1 | 2½ | 1½ | - | 3 | 3 | 6 | 0 | 13½ |
| «E» | Cyprus | 0 | 0 | 1 | 1 | 0 | ½ | 0 | 1 | 1 | - | 0 | 9 | 0 | 4½ |

- Team Albania refused to play South Africa due to political reasons.

=== Finals ===
Final A
| # | Country | Players | Points | MP | Head- to-head |
|---|---|---|---|---|---|
| 1 | Soviet Union | Spassky, Petrosian, Korchnoi, Polugaevsky, Smyslov, Geller | 27½ | | |
| 2 | Hungary | Portisch, Lengyel, Bilek, Forintos, Csom, Ribli | 26½ | | |
| 3 | Yugoslavia | Gligorić, Ivkov, Matulović, Matanović, Parma, Minić | 26 | | |
| 4 | United States | Fischer, Reshevsky, Evans, Benko, Lombardy, Mednis | 24½ | | |
| 5 | Czechoslovakia | Hort, Filip, Jansa, Smejkal, Přibyl, Blatný | 23½ | | |
| 6 | West Germany | Unzicker, Schmid, Darga, Hecht, Mohrlok, Klundt | 22 | | |
| 7 | Bulgaria | Bobotsov, Tringov, Padevsky, Popov, Radulov, Kolarov | 21½ | 10 | 2½ |
| 8 | Argentina | Najdorf, Panno, Bolbochán, Quinteros, Rubinetti, Juárez | 21½ | 10 | 1½ |
| 9 | East Germany | Uhlmann, Malich, Liebert, Hennings, Zinn, Baumbach | 19 | | |
| 10 | Romania | Gheorghiu, Ciocâltea, Ghițescu, Ungureanu, Mititelu, Reicher | 18½ | | |
| 11 | Canada | Yanofsky, Suttles, Vranesic, Witt, Amos, Fuster | 17½ | | |
| 12 | Spain | Pomar, Díez del Corral, Torán, Medina, Calvo, Bellón López | 16 | | |

Final B
| # | Country | Players | Points | MP | Head- to-head |
|---|---|---|---|---|---|
| 13 | Israel | Kagan, Kraidman, Peretz, Geller, Gelfer, Bleiman | 27 | | |
| 14 | Poland | Kostro, Doda, Adamski, Schmidt, Bednarski, Filipowicz | 25 | | |
| 15 | Australia | Browne, Fuller, Hamilton, Shaw, Purdy, Koshnitsky | 24½ | | |
| 16 | Mongolia | Myagmarsuren, Üitümen, Lhagva, Zorigt, Jigjidsuren, Gungabazar | 23½ | | |
| 17 | Sweden | Andersson, Jansson, Kinnmark, Liljedahl, Johansson, Olsson | 23 | 13 | 2½ |
| 18 | Netherlands | Scholl, Ree, Langeweg, Zuidema, Bouwmeester, Hartoch | 23 | 13 | 1½ |
| 19 | Denmark | Larsen, Petersen, Jakobsen, Moe, Holm, Enevoldsen | 22 | | |
| 20 | Finland | Westerinen, Ojanen, Sirkiä, Koskinen, Lahti, Gostowski | 21½ | | |
| 21 | Cuba | García Martínez, Jiménez, Cobo Arteaga, Hernández, Carlos Diaz, Lebredo Zarragoitia | 20 | | |
| 22 | Austria | Dückstein, Holaszek, Kinzel, Röhrl, Steiner, Janetschek | 19½ | | |
| 23 | Colombia | Rodríguez, Cuéllar, Cuartas, Alzate, de Greiff, Muñoz | 18 | | |
| 24 | Indonesia | Wotulo, Ardiansyah, Rusli, Bachtiar, Bessaria, Hamdan A. H. | 17 | | |

Final C
| # | Country | Players | Points | MP |
|---|---|---|---|---|
| 25 | England | Penrose, Keene, Hartston, Lee, Whiteley, Corden | 30 | |
| 26 | Philippines | Naranja, Torre, Rodríguez, De Castro, Lobigas, Estimo | 27½ | |
| 27 | Iceland | Sigurjónsson, Kristinsson, Thorbergsson, Magnússon, Sólmundarson, Angantýsson | 26 | |
| 28 | Brazil | Câmara, Rocha, Nóbrega, Toth, Resende, Pinto Paiva | 25½ | |
| 29 | Norway | Johannessen, Hoen, Vinje-Gulbrandsen, Wibe, de Lange, Øgaard | 24 | |
| 30 | Italy | Tatai, Paoli, Primavera, Zichichi, Cosulich, Romani | 22½ | |
| 31 | Greece | Siaperas, Vizantiadis, Trikaliotis, Kazilaris, Skalkotas, Papapostolou | 20 | |
| 32 | Iran | Hemmasi, Mashian, Safvat, Harandi, Ebrahimi, Sharif | 19 | |
| 33 | Belgium | Boey, Cornelis, Beyen, Schumacher, Van Schoor, Wostyn | 18½ | 10 |
| 34 | Scotland | Levy, Pritchett, McKay, Bonner, Jamieson, Freeman | 18½ | 9 |
| 35 | Tunisia | Bouaziz, Belkadi, Kchouk, Amandou, Nouisseri, Lagha | 17½ | |
| 36 | Puerto Rico | Kaplan, Colón Romero M., Berríos Pagán, Martínez Buitrago, Sacarello, Cintrón | 14½ | |

Final D
| # | Country | Players | Points | MP |
|---|---|---|---|---|
| 37 | Switzerland | Lombard, Schaufelberger, Gereben, Hohler, Huss, Castagna | 29½ | |
| 38 | Albania | Pustina, Duraku, Vila, Adhami, Omari, Konçi | 28 | |
| 39 | Peru | Rodríguez Vargas, Súmar Casis, Quiñones, Vásquez, Espinoza, Miranda | 27½ | |
| 40 | Singapore | Tan Lian Ann, Lim Kok Ann, Giam Choo Kwee, Lee Chee Seng, Pang Kwok Leong, Leow | 26½ | |
| 41 | Portugal | Cordovil, Durão, Gilbert, Ribeiro, Santos, Rego | 24½ | |
| 42 | Ireland | Littleton, Patterson, Moles, Heidenfeld, Henry, Kennefick | 23½ | |
| 43 | South Africa | Friedgood, Price, Heyns, Griffiths, Dreyer, Bloch | 22½ | |
| 44 | Mexico | Campos López, Acevedo, Winter Gallegos, Mondragón, Rizo, Terrazas | 21 | |
| 45 | Lebanon | Sursock, Tarazi, Loheac-Ammoun, Salameh, Bedros, Galeb | 17 | |
| 46 | Luxembourg | Feller, Stull, Philippe, Schammo, Weber, Milbers | 15½ | |
| 47 | Japan | Miyasaki, Matsumoto, Higashi, Hoshino I., Nonaka, Arita | 15 | |
| 48 | Dominican Republic | Belliard Alonzo, Malagón, Yabra, Andujar, Gonzáles, Belliard | 13½ | |

Final E
| # | Country | Players | Points | MP |
|---|---|---|---|---|
| 49 | New Zealand | Sarapu, Wade, Anderson, Evans C. A., Kerr, Green | 36 | |
| 50 | Rhodesia | Donnely, Hope, Fox, Lampitt, Bennett, Levy | 28 | 17 |
| 51 | Turkey | İbrahimoğlu, Bilyap, Uzman, Nutku, Öztürk, Günsav | 28 | 16 |
| 52 | Malta | Camilleri, Gouder, Saliba, Sollars, Cilia Vincenti, Pace Floridia | 27½ | |
| 53 | Hong Kong | Krstic, Kazanski, Hasan, Krouk, Fung Yee Wang, Hasan | 26 | |
| 54 | Morocco | Kaderi, Belarbi, Marachi, Bouadid, Kattani, Bendriss | 25 | |
| 55 | Faroe Islands | Petersen, Olsen, Midjord, Thomsen, Vilhelm, Durhuus | 19 | |
| 56 | Andorra | Ulvestad, Clua Ballague, Calderó, Sanz, Pantebre Martínez, Grimpera | 18 | |
| 57 | Cyprus | Avgousti, Kleopas, Constantinou, Georgiades G., Hadjittofis, Lantsias | 16 | |
| 58 | British Virgin Islands | Hook, Hoyt, Abraham, Potter, Scherman, Edwards | 15 | |
| 59 | Guernsey | Withers, Palmer, Jones, Lainé, Naftel, Bisson | 13 | |
| 60 | Monaco | Lorinczi Retek, Barriera, Dusclaux, Zapuzek, Scharf, Martelli R. | 12½ | |

=== Final «A» ===
- Matches played in semi-finals are italicized.

| № | Country | 1 | 2 | 3 | 4 | 5 | 6 | 7 | 8 | 9 | 10 | 11 | 12 | + | − | = | Points |
|---|---|---|---|---|---|---|---|---|---|---|---|---|---|---|---|---|---|
| 1 | Soviet Union | - | 2 | 2 | 2½ | 2½ | 2½ | 2 | 2 | 3 | 2½ | 3½ | 3 | 7 | 0 | 4 | 27½ |
| 2 | Hungary | 2 | - | 1½ | 2½ | 2 | 2½ | 2½ | 2½ | 3 | 2½ | 3 | 2½ | 8 | 1 | 2 | 26½ |
| 3 | Yugoslavia | 2 | 2½ | - | 2 | 2 | 2½ | 2½ | 2½ | 2½ | 2½ | 2½ | 2½ | 8 | 0 | 3 | 26 |
| 4 | United States | 1½ | 1½ | 2 | - | 2 | 2½ | 3½ | 3 | 1½ | 2½ | 2 | 2½ | 5 | 3 | 3 | 24½ |
| 5 | Czechoslovakia | 1½ | 2 | 2 | 2 | - | 2½ | 1 | 2 | 2 | 2 | 3½ | 3 | 3 | 2 | 6 | 23½ |
| 6 | West Germany | 1½ | 1½ | 1½ | 1½ | 1½ | - | 2 | 2½ | 2 | 3 | 2½ | 2½ | 4 | 5 | 2 | 22 |
| 7 | Bulgaria | 2 | 1½ | 1½ | ½ | 3 | 2 | - | 2½ | 2 | 1½ | 2 | 3 | 3 | 4 | 4 | 21½ |
| 8 | Argentina | 2 | 1½ | 1½ | 1 | 2 | 1½ | 1½ | - | 2½ | 2½ | 2½ | 3 | 4 | 5 | 2 | 21½ |
| 9 | East Germany | 1 | 1 | 1½ | 2½ | 2 | 2 | 2 | 1½ | - | 2 | 2 | 1½ | 1 | 5 | 5 | 19 |
| 10 | Romania | 1½ | 1½ | 1½ | 1½ | 2 | 1 | 2½ | 1½ | 2 | - | 1½ | 2 | 1 | 7 | 3 | 18½ |
| 11 | Canada | ½ | 1 | 1½ | 2 | ½ | 1½ | 2 | 1½ | 2 | 2½ | - | 2½ | 2 | 6 | 3 | 17½ |
| 12 | Spain | 1 | 1½ | 1½ | 1½ | 1 | 1½ | 1 | 1 | 2½ | 2 | 1½ | - | 1 | 9 | 1 | 16 |

=== Final «B» ===
- Matches played in semi-finals are italicized.

| № | Country | 13 | 14 | 15 | 16 | 17 | 18 | 19 | 20 | 21 | 22 | 23 | 24 | + | − | = | Points |
|---|---|---|---|---|---|---|---|---|---|---|---|---|---|---|---|---|---|
| 13 | Israel | - | 2½ | 2½ | 3 | 3 | 3 | 2 | 2½ | 2 | 2 | 1½ | 3 | 7 | 1 | 3 | 27 |
| 14 | Poland | 1½ | - | 3 | 3½ | 1½ | 2 | 3½ | 0 | 2 | 2½ | 3 | 2½ | 6 | 3 | 2 | 25 |
| 15 | Australia | 1½ | 1 | - | 2½ | 3½ | 1 | 1½ | 1½ | 3 | 3½ | 2½ | 3 | 6 | 5 | 0 | 24½ |
| 16 | Mongolia | 1 | ½ | 1½ | - | 2½ | 2 | 3 | 3 | 3 | 2 | 2½ | 2½ | 6 | 3 | 2 | 23½ |
| 17 | Sweden | 1 | 2½ | ½ | 1½ | - | 2½ | 2 | 3 | 2 | 3½ | 2½ | 2 | 5 | 3 | 3 | 23 |
| 18 | Netherlands | 1 | 2 | 3 | 2 | 1½ | - | 2½ | 2 | 2½ | 2½ | 2 | 2 | 4 | 2 | 5 | 23 |
| 19 | Denmark | 2 | ½ | 2½ | 1 | 2 | 1½ | - | 3 | 3 | ½ | 2½ | 3½ | 5 | 4 | 2 | 22 |
| 20 | Finland | 1½ | 4 | 2½ | 1 | 1 | 2 | 1 | - | 1½ | 2½ | 3 | 1½ | 4 | 6 | 1 | 21½ |
| 21 | Cuba | 2 | 2 | 1 | 1 | 2 | 1½ | 1 | 2½ | - | 3 | 2 | 2 | 2 | 4 | 5 | 20 |
| 22 | Austria | 2 | 1½ | ½ | 2 | ½ | 1½ | 3½ | 1½ | 1 | - | 2 | 3½ | 2 | 6 | 3 | 19½ |
| 23 | Colombia | 2½ | 1 | 1½ | 1½ | 1½ | 2 | 1½ | 1 | 2 | 2 | - | 1½ | 1 | 7 | 3 | 18 |
| 24 | Indonesia | 1 | 1½ | 1 | 1½ | 2 | 2 | ½ | 2½ | 2 | ½ | 2½ | - | 2 | 6 | 3 | 17 |

=== Final «C» ===
- Matches played in semi-finals are italicized.

| № | Country | 25 | 26 | 27 | 28 | 29 | 30 | 31 | 32 | 33 | 34 | 35 | 36 | + | − | = | Points |
|---|---|---|---|---|---|---|---|---|---|---|---|---|---|---|---|---|---|
| 25 | England | - | 3 | 3 | 1½ | 2 | 2½ | 2½ | 2 | 4 | 3½ | 3 | 3 | 8 | 1 | 2 | 30 |
| 26 | Philippines | 1 | - | 2 | 1½ | 1 | 2½ | 3½ | 2½ | 4 | 3 | 3 | 3½ | 7 | 3 | 1 | 27½ |
| 27 | Iceland | 1 | 2' | - | 3 | 3 | 2½ | 2 | 3 | 1½ | 3½ | 2½ | 2 | 6 | 2 | 3 | 26 |
| 28 | Brazil | 2½ | 2½ | 1 | - | 2½ | 2 | 2½ | 2 | 2 | 3 | 3 | 2½ | 7 | 1 | 3 | 25½ |
| 29 | Norway | 2 | 3 | 1 | 1½ | - | 1 | 3 | 2½ | 2½ | 2 | 2 | 3½ | 5 | 3 | 3 | 24 |
| 30 | Italy | 1½ | 1½ | 1½ | 2 | 3 | - | 2 | 2 | 1½ | 2 | 2½ | 3 | 3 | 4 | 4 | 22½ |
| 31 | Greece | 1½ | ½ | 2 | 1½ | 1 | 2 | - | 2 | 2 | 3 | 3 | 2 | 2 | 4 | 5 | 20½ |
| 32 | Iran | 2 | 1½ | 1 | 2 | 1½ | 2 | 2 | - | 2½ | 1½ | 1 | 2 | 1 | 5 | 5 | 19 |
| 33 | Belgium | 0 | 0 | 2½ | 2 | 1½ | 2½ | 2 | 1½ | - | 2 | 2½ | 2 | 3 | 4 | 4 | 18½ |
| 34 | Scotland | ½ | 1 | ½ | 1 | 2 | 2 | 1 | 2½ | 2 | - | 3 | 3 | 3 | 5 | 3 | 18½ |
| 35 | Tunisia | 1 | 1 | 1½ | 1 | 2 | 1½ | 1 | 3 | 1½ | 1 | - | 3 | 2 | 8 | 1 | 17½ |
| 36 | Puerto Rico | 1 | ½ | 2 | 1½ | ½ | 1 | 2 | 2 | 2 | 1 | 1 | - | 0 | 7 | 4 | 14½ |

=== Final «D» ===
- Matches played in semi-finals are italicized.

| № | Country | 37 | 38 | 39 | 40 | 41 | 42 | 43 | 44 | 45 | 46 | 47 | 48 | + | − | = | Points |
|---|---|---|---|---|---|---|---|---|---|---|---|---|---|---|---|---|---|
| 37 | Switzerland | - | 2½ | 1½ | 2 | 3 | 2 | 3 | 3½ | 3 | 2½ | 3 | 3½ | 8 | 1 | 2 | 29½ |
| 38 | Albania | 1½ | - | 2 | 2 | 2½ | 3 | 0 | 3 | 3 | 3½ | 4 | 3½ | 7 | 2 | 2 | 28 |
| 39 | Peru | 2½ | 2 | - | 2½ | 2½ | 2 | 2 | 3 | 3 | 2½ | 3½ | 2 | 7 | 0 | 4 | 27½ |
| 40 | Singapore | 2 | 2 | 1½ | - | 2 | 2 | 2½ | 3½ | 3 | 2 | 2½ | 3½ | 5 | 1 | 5 | 26½ |
| 41 | Portugal | 1 | 1½ | 1½ | 2 | - | 3 | 2 | 1 | 2 | 3 | 4 | 3½ | 4 | 4 | 3 | 24½ |
| 42 | Ireland | 2 | 1 | 2 | 2 | 1 | - | 3½ | 2½ | 3 | 2 | 2 | 2½ | 4 | 2 | 5 | 23½ |
| 43 | South Africa | 1 | 4 | 2 | 1½ | 2 | ½ | - | 1 | 3 | 3 | 1½ | 3 | 4 | 5 | 2 | 22½ |
| 44 | Mexico | ½ | 1 | 1 | ½ | 3 | 1½ | 3 | - | 1½ | 3 | 2 | 4 | 4 | 6 | 1 | 21 |
| 45 | Lebanon | 1 | 1 | 1 | 1 | 2 | 1 | 1 | 2½ | - | 1½ | 3 | 2 | 2 | 7 | 2 | 17 |
| 46 | Luxembourg | 1½ | ½ | 1½ | 2 | 1 | 2 | 1 | 1 | 2½ | - | 1½ | 1 | 1 | 8 | 2 | 15½ |
| 47 | Japan | 1 | 0 | ½ | 1½ | 0 | 2 | 2½ | 2 | 1 | 2½ | - | 2 | 2 | 6 | 3 | 15 |
| 48 | Dominican Republic | ½ | ½ | 2 | ½ | ½ | 1½ | 1 | 0 | 2 | 3 | 2 | - | 1 | 7 | 3 | 13½ |

=== Final «E» ===
- Matches played in semi-finals are italicized.

| № | Country | 49 | 50 | 51 | 52 | 53 | 54 | 55 | 56 | 57 | 58 | 59 | 60 | + | − | = | Points |
|---|---|---|---|---|---|---|---|---|---|---|---|---|---|---|---|---|---|
| 49 | New Zealand | - | 4 | 3½ | 3 | 2 | 2 | 4 | 3½ | 3 | 3½ | 4 | 3½ | 9 | 0 | 2 | 36 |
| 50 | Rhodesia | 0 | - | 2 | 1 | 2½ | 2½ | 3½ | 3½ | 3½ | 4 | 2½ | 3½ | 8 | 2 | 1 | 28 |
| 51 | Turkey | ½ | 2 | - | 1½ | 3 | 2½ | 4 | 3½ | 2 | 3 | 3 | 3 | 7 | 2 | 2 | 28 |
| 52 | Malta | 1 | 3 | 2½ | - | 2 | 2 | 2 | 3 | 2½ | 3½ | 3 | 3 | 7 | 1 | 3 | 27½ |
| 53 | Hong Kong | 2 | 1½ | 1 | 2 | - | 3 | 3 | 2 | 2½ | 3 | 3 | 3 | 6 | 2 | 3 | 26 |
| 54 | Morocco | 2 | 1½ | 1½ | 2 | 1 | - | 1 | 2½ | 3½ | 3 | 3½ | 3½ | 5 | 4 | 2 | 25 |
| 55 | Faroe Islands | 0 | ½ | 0 | 2 | 1 | 3 | - | 1 | 2 | 2 | 3½ | 4 | 3 | 5 | 3 | 19 |
| 56 | Andorra | ½ | ½ | ½ | 1 | 2 | 1½ | 3 | - | 3 | 2½ | 1½ | 2 | 3 | 6 | 2 | 18 |
| 57 | Cyprus | 1 | ½ | 2 | 1½ | 1½ | ½ | 2 | 1 | - | 3 | 1½ | 1½ | 1 | 8 | 2 | 16 |
| 58 | British Virgin Islands | ½ | 0 | 1 | ½ | 1 | 1 | 2 | 1½ | 1 | - | 3½ | 3 | 2 | 8 | 1 | 15 |
| 59 | Guernsey | 0 | 1½ | 1 | 1 | 1 | ½ | ½ | 2½ | 2½ | ½ | - | 2 | 2 | 8 | 1 | 13 |
| 60 | Monaco | ½ | 1 | 1 | 1 | 1 | ½ | 0 | 2 | 2½ | 1 | 2 | - | 1 | 8 | 2 | 12½ |

=== Individual medals ===
- Board 1: (Soviet Union) Boris Spassky 9½ / 12 = 79.2%
- Board 2: (Socialist Federal Republic of Yugoslavia) Borislav Ivkov 10 / 13 = 76.9%
- Board 3: (England) William Hartston 12½ / 16 = 78.1%
- Board 4: (Socialist Federal Republic of Yugoslavia) Aleksandar Matanović 10 / 12 = 83.3%
- 1st reserve: (United States) William Lombardy 11 / 14 = 78.6%
- 2nd reserve: (Philippines) Samuel Estimo 8 / 10 = 80.0%

=== Best game ===
The 'Best Game' prize went to Lothar Schmid (West Germany) - Anton Kinzel (Austria) from the preliminaries.
