= Iranian Chess Championship =

Yearly Iranian chess championship

The Iranian Chess Championship is the yearly national chess championship of Iran. The competition was not held between 1980 and 1990 (1359 and 1369 according to the Iranian calendar), when chess was forbidden in Iran. There is also a gap between 1978 and 1980 (1356 and 1358) because of the Iran Revolution.

== Champions ==
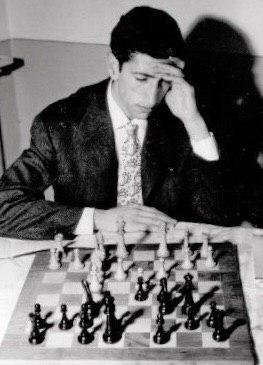
Yousof Safvat, the first Iran chess champion

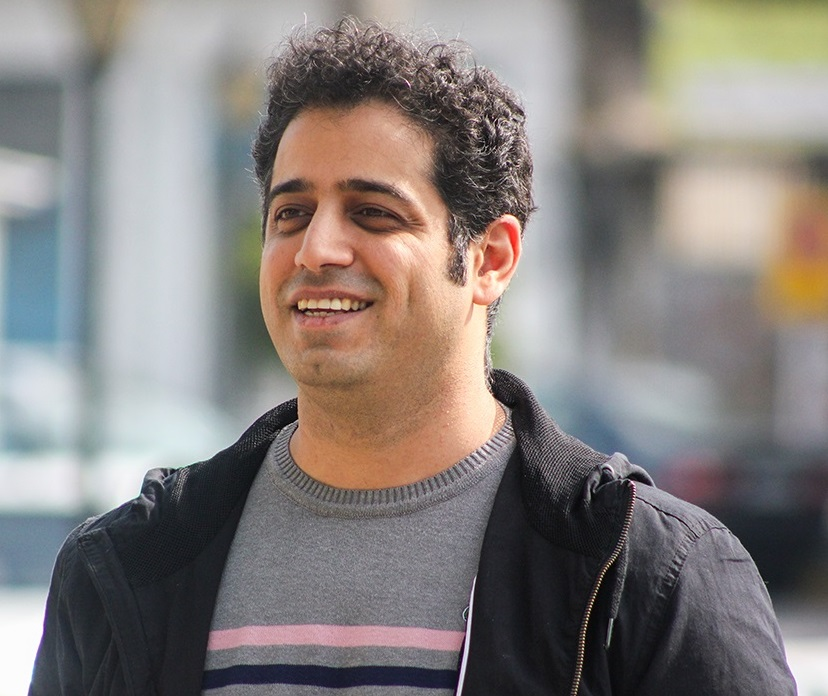
Ehsan Ghaem-Maghami, the 13-time Iran chess champion

#	Gregorian	Iranian	Winner
1	1955/1956	1334	Yousof Safvat
2	1956/1957	1335	Yousof Safvat
3	1957/1958	1336	Yousof Safvat
4	1958/1959	1337	Houshang Mashian
5	1959/1960	1338	Yousof Safvat
6	1960/1961	1339	Robert Lalazarian
7	1961/1962	1340	Touraj Ebrahimi
8	1962/1963	1341	Morteza Hemmasian
9	1963/1964	1342	Mansour Jelveh
10	1964/1965	1343	Keikhosro Kahyaei
11	1966/1967	1345	Mohammad Hossein Farboud
12	1967/1968	1346	Mohammad Hossein Farboud
13	1968/1969	1347	Nasser Hemmasi
14	1969/1970	1348	Nasser Hemmasi
15	1970/1971	1349	Nasser Hemmasi
16	1971/1972	1350	Khosro Harandi
17	1973/1974	1352	Mehrshad Sharif
18	1974/1975	1353	Mehrshad Sharif
19	1975/1976	1354	Mehrshad Sharif
20	1976/1977	1355	Mehrshad Sharif
21	1977/1978	1356	Khosro Harandi
22	1979/1980	1358	Mehrshad Sharif
23	1980/1981	1359	Mehrshad Sharif
24	1990/1991	1369	Khosro Harandi
25	1991/1992	1370	Hadi Momeni
26	1992/1993	1371	Hossein Aryanejad
27	1993/1994	1372	Hadi Momeni
28	1994/1995	1373	Esmaeil Safarzadeh
29	1995/1996	1374	Hossein Aryanejad
30	1996/1997	1375	Mohammad Deljou
31	1997/1998	1376	Ehsan Ghaem-Maghami
32	1998/1999	1377	Hassan Abbasifar
33	1999/2000	1378	Ehsan Ghaem-Maghami
34	2000/2001	1379	Ehsan Ghaem-Maghami
35	2001/2002	1380	Elshan Moradi
36	2002/2003	1381	Ehsan Ghaem-Maghami
37	2003/2004	1382	Mohsen Ghorbani
38	2004/2005	1383	Ehsan Ghaem-Maghami
39	2005/2006	1384	Morteza Mahjoub
40	2006/2007	1385	Ehsan Ghaem-Maghami
41	2007/2008	1386	Ehsan Ghaem-Maghami
42	2008/2009	1387	Morteza Mahjoub
43	2009/2010	1388	Ehsan Ghaem-Maghami
44	2010/2011	1389	Ehsan Ghaem-Maghami
45	2011/2012	1390	Ehsan Ghaem-Maghami; Asghar Golizadeh
46	2012/2013	1391	Asghar Golizadeh
47	2013/2014	1392	Ehsan Ghaem-Maghami
48	2014/2015	1393	Ehsan Ghaem-Maghami
49	2015/2016	1394	Alireza Firouzja
50	2016/2017	1395	Parham Maghsoodloo
51	2017/2018	1396	Parham Maghsoodloo
52	2018/2019	1397	Alireza Firouzja
53	2019/2020	1398	Ehsan Ghaem-Maghami
54	2020/2021	1399	Parham Maghsoodloo
55	2021/2022	1401	Bardiya Daneshvar
56	2022/2023	1402	Amirreza Pour Agha Bala
57	2023/2024	1403	Abtin Atakhan
58	2024/2025	1404	Abtin Atakhan

== Women ==
#	Gregorian	Iranian	Winner
1	1974/1975	1353	Shokooh Soroush-Azar
2	1976/1977	1355	Shokooh Soroush-Azar
3	1977/1978	1356	Shokooh Soroush-Azar
4	2000/2001	1379	Shadi Paridar
5	2003/2004	1382	Shadi Paridar
6	2004/2005	1383	Shadi Paridar
7	2006/2007	1385	Shadi Paridar
8	2007/2008	1386	Atousa Pourkashiyan
9	2008/2009	1387	Atousa Pourkashiyan
10	2009/2010	1388	Atousa Pourkashiyan
11	2010/2011	1389	Ghazal Hakimifard
12	2011/2012	1390	Atousa Pourkashiyan
13	2012/2013	1391	Mitra Hejazipour
14	2013/2014	1392	Atousa Pourkashiyan
15	2014/2015	1393	Atousa Pourkashiyan
16	2015/2016	1394	Sarasadat Khademalsharieh
17	2016/2017	1395	Vesal Hamedinia
18	2017/2018	1396	Mobina Alinasab
19	2018/2019	1397	Anousha Mahdian
20	2019/2020	1398	Anahita Zahedifar
