= Kler Çaku =

Albanian chess player (born 2010)

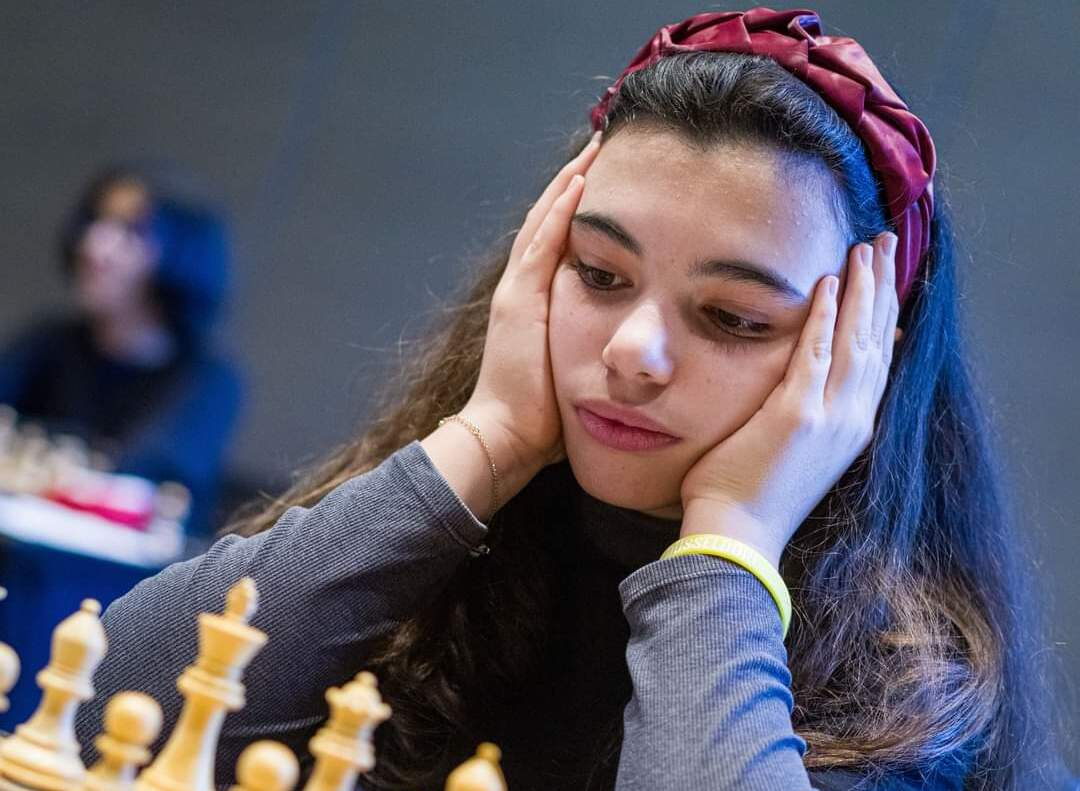
- Çaku in 2022

Personal information
- Born: 4 April 2010 (age 16) Shkodër, Albania

Chess career
- Country: Albania
- Title: Woman FIDE Master (2024)
- Peak rating: 2184 (October 2026)

Kler Çaku (born 4 April 2010) is an Albanian chess player.

== Career ==
Çaku won the 2021 Albanian Women's Chess Championship, aged 11, finishing half a point ahead of 14–time Albania champion Eglantina Shabanaj.

Çaku is an Arena Grand Master. In February 2021, she was a winner of the Worldwide Junior Chess Festival, held on the Lichess platform.

In July 2021, she won the online tournament Rudaga-Kaissa 2021 in the Girls U12 category.

In July 2022, the European Youth Blitz Championship was held in Thessaloniki, and Çaku finished the event in third place with 12 points.

From 29 July 2022 to 9 August 2022, she played for the first time for the Albanian team at the 44th Chess Olympiad 2022 Women in Chennai on the third table, scoring 5 points in 10 games played. She was named a conditional Woman Candidate Chess Master (WCM).

In September 2022, Çaku played in Balkan Youth Chess Championship 2022 and won the gold medal in the Girls U12 in Standard, the gold medal in the Blitz Tournament for both boys and girls in Open U12, and the silver medal in the Rapid Tournament for Girls U12.

In November 2022, the European Youth Chess Championship 2022 was held in Antalya, Turkey. Çaku finished the event in fifth place, scoring 6.5 points in 9 games played with no defeats.

From 21 to 25 February 2023, she won the event 1 World Chess Juniors 2023 in girls section G14 held in Düsseldorf, scoring 4.5 points in 5 games played.

In September 2023, the European Youth Rapid and Blitz Championship was held in Terme Catez, Slovenia. Çaku won the Rapid tournament with seven victories and two ties. In the Blitz tournament, she shared first place with the Croatian player, scoring the same number of points. After Buchholz system (Buchholz system) she took second place.

In December 2023, she won her second championship title at the Albanian Women's Chess Championship, after 8 rounds with 6.5 points, 6 victories, 1 tie and 1 loss.

From 11 to 22 September 2024, she played for the second time for the Albanian team at the 45th Chess Olympiad 2024 Women in Budapest on the third table, scoring 6.5 points in 10 games played. She won the Woman Fide Master title (WFM).

In August 2025, the European Youth Rapid Championship was held in Thessaloniki, and Çaku finished the event in third place with 6.5 points in 9 games played.

In November 2025, the European Rapid & Blitz Chess Champions 2025 crowned in Prishtina, and Kler Çaku won Second Place "Female of the Tournament" in Rapid and 1-st place as G18 player in Blitz.

In July 2026, the Mediterranean Rapid Championship 2026 - U20 crowned in Budva, Montenegro and Kler Çaku won Second Place in section Girls 20.

From 16 to 27 September 2026, she played for the third time for the Albanian team at the 46th Chess Olympiad 2026 Women in Samarkand on the second table, scoring 8.5 points in 11 games played
