= Liljedahl =

Liljedahl is a surname. Notable people with the surname include:

- Edvard Liljedahl (1845–1924), Norwegian politician
- Magnus Liljedahl (born 1954), American sailor
- Marie Liljedahl (born 1950), Swedish actress
- Lennart Liljedahl (born 1947), Swedish chess player
- Peter Liljedahl (born 1967), Swedish sprint canoer
