= Cosulich =

Cosulich is an Italian surname. Notable people with the surname include:

- Callisto Cosulich (1922–2015), Italian film critic
- Roberto Cosulich (1946–1980), Italian chess master
