= Nasser Hemmasi =

Iranian chess player (born 1944)

Personal information
- Born: 17 July 1944 (age 81)

Chess career
- Country: Iran

Nasser Hemmasi (Persian: ناصر حمصی; born July 17, 1944) was an Iranian chess player, three-times Iranian Chess Championship winner (1969, 1970, 1971).

== Biography ==
From the late 1960's Nasser Hemmasi was one of the leading Iranian chess players. He won the Iranian Championship 3 times in a row Iranian Chess Championship: 1969, 1970, and 1971. In 1969, in Singapore Nasser Hemmasi participated in FIDE World Chess Championship West Asian Zonal tournament and shared 6th-7th place.

Nasser Hemmasi played for Iran in the Chess Olympiad:

- In 1970, at first board in the 19th Chess Olympiad in Siegen (+4, =6, -7).
