= Esat Duraku =

Albanian chess player (1936–2021)

Personal information
- Born: 16 January 1936
- Died: 2 January 2021 (aged 84)

Chess career
- Country: Albania

Esat Duraku (16 January 1936 – 2 January 2021) was an Albanian chess player, five-time Albanian Chess Championship winner (1954, 1955, 1956, 1958, 1963).

== Biography ==
From the mid-1950s to the end of 1960s Esat Duraku was one of Albania's leading chess players. He five time won Albanian Chess Championship: 1954, 1955, 1956, 1958, and 1963.

Duraku played for Albania in the Chess Olympiads:

- In 1962, at second board in the 15th Chess Olympiad in Varna (+5, =8, -3),
- In 1970, at second board in the 19th Chess Olympiad in Siegen (+5, =5, -6).

Duraku played for Albania in the World Student Team Chess Championship:

- In 1958, at second board in the 5th World Student Team Chess Championship in Varna (+2, =4, -4).

After 1970 Esat Duraku did not participate in international chess tournaments.

Esat Duraku died on 2 January 2021, two weeks shy of his 85th birthday.
