= Florian Vila =

Albanian chess player

Personal information
- Born: unknown
- Died: unknown

Chess career
- Country: Albania

Florian Vila (unknown – unknown) was an Albanian chess player, two-times Albanian Chess Championship winner (1963, 1973).

== Biography ==
From the begin to 1960s to the begin 1970s Florian Vila was one of Albania's leading chess players. He two times won Albanian Chess Championship: 1963, and 1973.

Florian Vila played for Albania in the Chess Olympiads:

- In 1970, at third board in the 19th Chess Olympiad in Siegen (+7, =4, -4),
- In 1972, at second board in the 20th Chess Olympiad in Skopje (+3, =2, -2).

Florian Vila played for Albania in the European Team Chess Championship preliminaries:

- In 1977, at fourth board in the 6th European Team Chess Championship preliminaries (+1, =0, -2).
