= Klaus Klundt =

German chess player

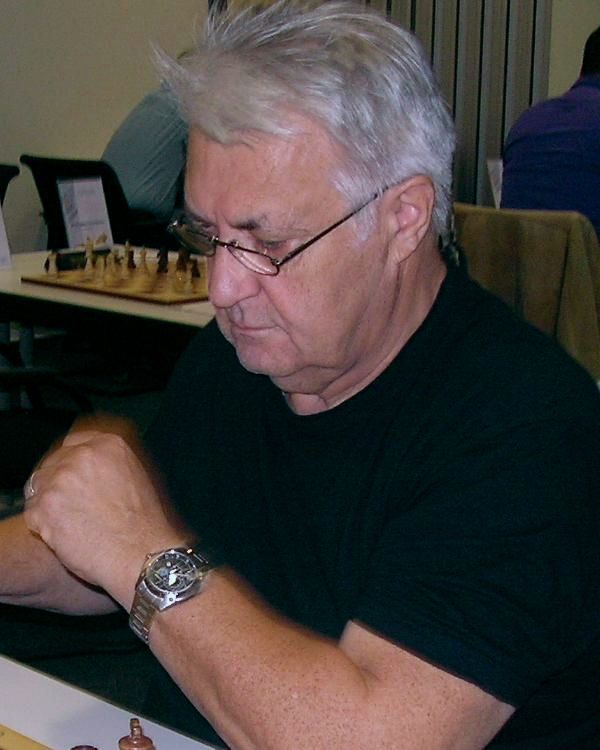
- Klaus Klundt in 2010

Personal information
- Born: 25 December 1941 (age 84) Mühlwitz, Silesia, Germany

Chess career
- Country: Germany
- Title: International Master (1988)
- Peak rating: 2415 (January 1990)

Klaus Klundt (born 25 December 1941) is a German chess International Master (1988), German Chess Championship medalist (1969, 1970), and World Senior Chess Championship medalist (2004).

== Biography ==
Klundt was multiple participant in the West German Chess Championship finals, where he won two medals: silver (1970) and bronze (1969).

He played for West Germany in the World Student Team Chess Championships:

- In 1968, at first reserve board in the 15th World Student Team Chess Championship in Ybbs (+4, =2, -2) and won team silver medal.

Klundt played for West Germany in the Chess Olympiads:

- In 1970, at second reserve board in the 19th Chess Olympiad in Siegen (+4, =2, -2).

Klundt played for West Germany in the Clare Benedict Cup:

- In 1971, at third board in the 18th Clare Benedict Chess Cup in Madrid (+1, =1, -2).

He played for West Germany in the Nordic Chess Cups:

- In 1972, at third board in the 3rd Nordic Chess Cup in Großenbrode (+1, =1, -2) and won team bronze medal.

He returned to active chess play in the second half of the 1980s, achieving successes on the international chess tournaments: shared 2nd place in Augsburg (1987/88), shared 2nd place in Würzburg (1989), ranked 3rd place in Linz (1995) and shared 1st place in Augsburg (1997). In 1988, he was awarded the FIDE International Master (IM) title.

In Halle in 2004, Klundt won silver medal in the World Senior Chess Championship (S60 age group), and won the German Senior Chess Championship in Essen the following year.
