= Bujar Hoxha =

Albanian chess player

Personal information
- Born: 1930
- Died: unknown

Chess career
- Country: Albania

Bujar Hoxha (1930 – unknown) was an Albanian chess player, two-time Albanian Chess Championship winner.

== Biography ==
In the 1950s Bujar Hoxha was one of Albania's leading chess players. He twice won Albanian Chess Championship: in 1951, 1952 (together with Ylvi Pustina). In 1954, Bujar Hoxha represented Albania in World Chess Championship Zonal Tournament. In this tournament, he finished last, gaining 2 points out of 19 possible, played draw with Gideon Ståhlberg, Eigil Pedersen, Victor Ciocâltea and Ilmari Solin.

Bujar Hoxha played for Albania in the Chess Olympiad:

- In 1960, at second board in the 14th Chess Olympiad in Leipzig (+3, =8, -5).

Bujar Hoxha played for Albania in the Men's Chess Balkaniad:

- In 1946, at second board in the 1st Men's Chess Balkaniad in Belgrade (+0, =0, -3).
