= Emanoil-George Reicher =

Romanian chess player (1930–2019)

Personal information
- Born: 27 March 1930 Bucharest, Romania
- Died: 3 October 2019 (aged 89) Bucharest, Romania

Chess career
- Country: Romania
- Title: FIDE Master (1981)
- Peak rating: 2360 (July 1971)

Emanoil-George Reicher (27 March 1930 – 3 October 2019), also known as Emanuel-George Reicher, was a Romanian chess player. He held the FIDE titles of FIDE Master (FM) and International Arbiter.

== Biography ==
From the late 1960s to the early 1970s, Emanoil-George Reicher was one of the leading Romanian chess players. He was a multiple participant in the Romanian Chess Championships, several major international chess tournaments and the World Senior Chess Championships.

Emanoil-George Reicher played for Romania in the Chess Olympiads:

- In 1970, at the second reserve board in the 19th Chess Olympiad in Siegen (+2, =3, -1).

Emanoil-George Reicher played for Romania in the European Team Chess Championship preliminaries:

- In 1961, at the second board in the 2nd European Team Chess Championship preliminaries (+0, =2, -2),
- In 1965, at the fifth board in the 3rd European Team Chess Championship preliminaries (+0, =4, -2).
