= Hossein Aryanejad =

Iranian chess player (born 1958)

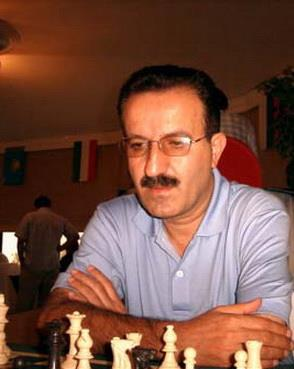

Personal information
- Born: 11 October 1958 (age 67) Sowme'eh Sara, Gilan province, Iran

Chess career
- Country: Iran
- Title: FIDE Master (1996)
- Peak rating: 2340 (July 1995)

Hossein Aryanejad (Persian: حسین آریانژاد; born 11 October 1958) is an Iranian chess player who holds the titles of FIDE Master and FIDE Trainer (2009). He won the Iranian Chess Championship in 1992 and 1995 and represented Iran in four Chess Olympiads.
