= Mehrshad Sharif =

Iranian chess player (born 1952)

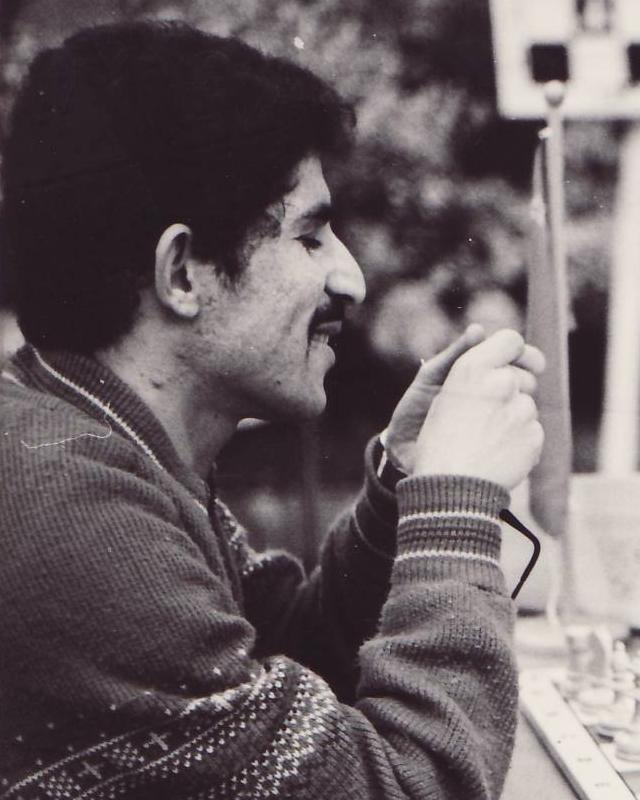
- Mehrshad Sharif in 1982

Personal information
- Born: 11 July 1952 (age 74) Pahlavi Iran

Chess career
- Country: Iran; France
- Title: International Master (1975)
- Peak rating: 2500 (January 1996)

Mehrshad Sharif (Persian: مهرشاد شریف; born 11 July 1952) is an Iranian and French chess International Master (1975) and a six-time Iranian Chess Championship winner (1974, 1975, 1976, 1977, 1980, 1981).

== Biography ==
From the mid-1970s to the beginning of the 1980s, Sharif was one of the leading Iranian chess players. He won the Iranian Chess Championship six times: in 1974, 1975, 1976, 1977, 1980, and 1981.

In the first half of the 1980s Sharif moved to France. He tied for first place in the French Chess Championship in 1985 but was beaten in the tiebreaker by Jean-Luc Seret, and he placed second in 1995 (behind Éric Prié).

Sharif played for Iran and France in the Chess Olympiads:

- In 1970, at second reserve board in the 19th Chess Olympiad in Siegen (+0, =2, -3),
- In 1972, at fourth board in the 20th Chess Olympiad in Skopje (+8, =6, -7),
- In 1974, at second board in the 21st Chess Olympiad in Nice (+12, =4, -3),
- In 1976, at first board in the 22nd Chess Olympiad in Haifa (+4, =5, -4),
- In 1986, at second reserve board in the 27th Chess Olympiad in Dubai (+2, =2, -0),

Sharif played for France in the World Team Chess Championship:

- In 1985, at fourth board in the 1st World Team Chess Championship in Lucerne (+0, =2, -2).

Sharif played for Iran in the World Student Team Chess Championships:

- In 1972, at third board in the 19th World Student Team Chess Championship in Graz (+5, =5, -3),
- In 1976, at first board in the 21st World Student Team Chess Championship in Caracas (+6, =2, -2).

Sharif played for France in the Men's Chess Mitropa Cup:

- In 1985, at first board in the 10th Chess Mitropa Cup in Aranđelovac (+1, =4, -1),
- In 1988, at first board in the 12th Chess Mitropa Cup in Aosta (+1, =4, -1).

In 1975, Sharif was awarded the FIDE International Master title.
