= Morteza Hemmasian =

Iranian chess player (born 1942)

Personal information
- Born: 1942 (age 83–84)

Chess career
- Country: Iran

Morteza Hemmasian (Persian: مرتضی حمصیان; born 1942) is an Iranian chess player, Iranian Chess Championship winner (1963).

== Biography ==
During the early 1960s, Morteza Hemmasian was one of Iran's leading chess players. He won the Iranian Chess Championship in 1963. In 1969, Hemmasian competed in the World Chess Championship West Asian Zonal tournament in Singapore, where he finished in eighth place.

Hemmasian represented Iran in the Chess Olympiad::

- In 1962, he played at the first board in the 15th Chess Olympiad in Varna (+5, =5, -9).
