= Luca Shytaj =

Albanian-Italian chess grandmaster and virologist (born 1986)

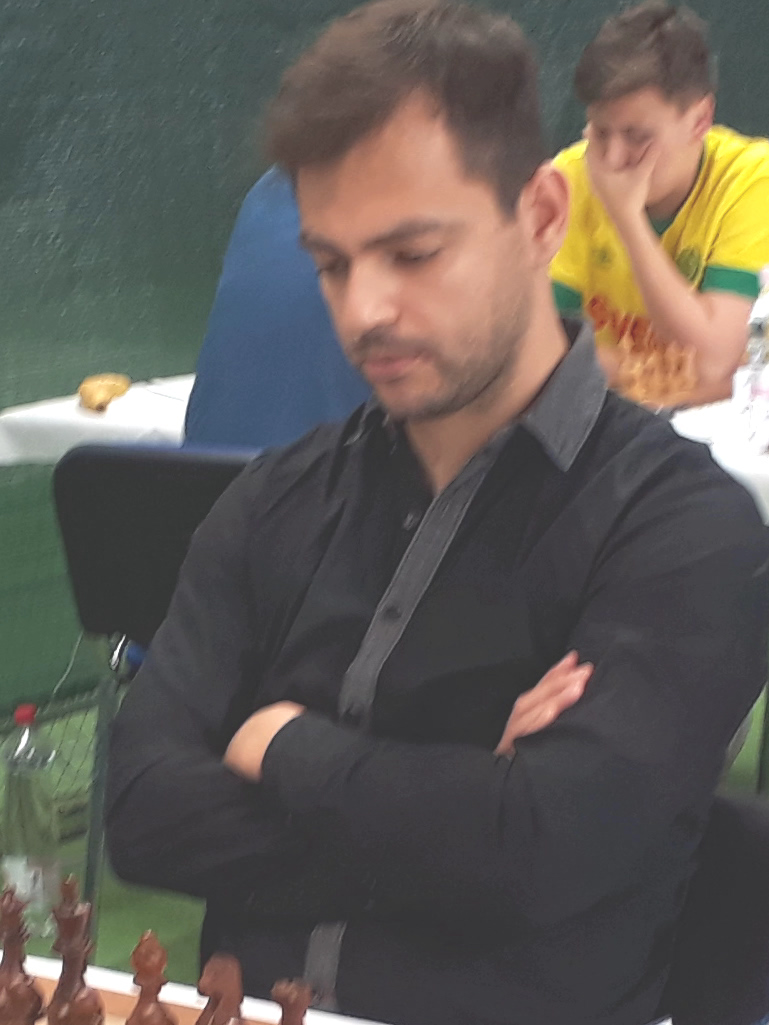
- Luca Shytaj, Mitropa Cup 2019

Personal information
- Born: Iart Luca Shytaj; 3 February 1986 (age 40) Tirana, Albania
- Spouse: Elisabeth Pähtz (m. 2015; sep. 2018)

Chess career
- Country: Albania (until 2007); Italy (since 2007)
- Title: Grandmaster (2018)
- FIDE rating: 2408 (July 2026)
- Peak rating: 2507 (September 2011)

Iart Luca Shytaj (born 3 February 1986) is an Albanian and Italian chess grandmaster and virologist.

== Chess career ==
Born on 3 February 1986, Shytaj won the Albanian Chess Championship in 2003. He earned his international master (IM) title in 2006, and won the Italian Rapid Chess Championship in 2009. He achieved his first grandmaster (GM) norm at the Arctic Chess Challenge in August 2009, his second during the 2016/17 Chess Bundesliga season, and his third at the Mulhouse Festival in July 2018. He was awarded the title in October 2018. He is the 14th Italian player to achieve the title of GM.

Shytaj represented Albania at the 36th and 37th Chess Olympiads, and Italy at the 38th Chess Olympiad.

== Scientific career ==
Shytaj received a bachelor's degree in biology from the Sapienza University of Rome, and a master's degree in genetics and molecular biology from the same university. His Ph.D. thesis, which resulted in a functional cure of AIDS in macaques, was named as one of the three best presentations at HIV Dart 2012, an international conference on drug development processes in antiretroviral research. As of 2017, Shytaj works at Heidelberg University.

== Personal life ==
Shytaj was born in Tirana. He moved to Italy with his parents at age six, and he became an Italian citizen in 2007. He married German GM Elisabeth Pähtz in September 2015. They separated in 2018.
