= Yousof Safvat =

Iranian chess player

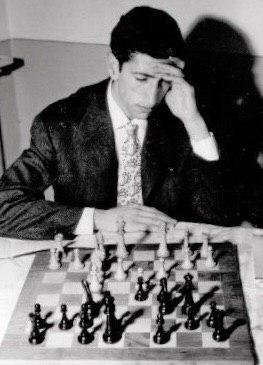
- Yousof Safvat in 1960s

Personal information
- Born: 15 February 1940 Tehran, Iran
- Died: 29 January 2003 (aged 72) Tehran, Iran

Chess career
- Country: Iran
- Peak rating: 2270 (July 1971)

Yousof (Younnus, Younus) Safvat (Persian: یوسف صفوت; 15 February 1940 in Tehran – 29 January 2003 in Tehran) was an Iranian chess player. He was the first official chess champion and national master of Iran.

He was a five-time winner (first time at the age of 15) of the Iranian Chess Championship (1955, 1956, 1957, 1959, 1965), and represented Iran in Chess Olympiads at Moscow 1956, Munich 1958, Varna 1962, Tel Aviv 1964, and Siegen 1970.
