= Aldo Zadrima =

Albanian chess player and FIDE trainer

Personal information
- Born: Aldo Zadrima; January 15, 1948 (age 78) Tirana, Albania

Chess career
- Country: Albania
- Years active: 1970s–present
- Peak rating: 2270 (January 1995)

Aldo Zadrima (born 15 January 1948) is an Albanian chess player, the Albanian national champion in 1994, and a licensed FIDE trainer. He has represented Albania in numerous international competitions since the early 1970s, including six Chess Olympiads and several regional and club events.

== Chess career ==
Zadrima emerged as one of Albania’s most notable players in the late twentieth century. In July 1994 he won the Albanian Chess Championship, becoming national champion.

He represented Albania in six Chess Olympiads: Skopje 1972, La Valletta 1980, Lucerne 1982, Thessaloniki 1984, Moscow 1994, and Bled 2002. He also competed in the Balkaniad team events of 1979 and 1994, and appeared in the European Chess Club Cup in 1999, representing Partizani Tirana.

His games are preserved in major international databases, and he is recorded with a peak FIDE rating of 2270 in January 1995. A selection of his recorded tournament games can be found in global databases such as 365Chess and ChessTempo.

=== Style of play and notable games ===
Zadrima is frequently described in Albanian chess circles as a highly technical player, known for creating original schemes and positional ideas. His play often emphasized long-term planning and subtle maneuvering rather than sharp tactical battles. One of his most cited performances is the victory against Selim Gürcan at the Zonal Tournament in Ankara 1995 (Sicilian Defence, Sozin Attack), where Zadrima introduced an uncommon plan in the middlegame that led to a decisive kingside initiative. His encounters with strong international masters and grandmasters from the Balkans and Central Europe are noted for inventive opening play.

== Coaching and international involvement ==
Zadrima holds the title of FIDE Trainer (awarded 2015) and the certification School Instructor (2017). He served as captain of the Albania women's team at the 45th Chess Olympiad (Budapest 2024), where the official team list explicitly records “Captain: Zadrima, Aldo.” He has also participated in various international activities as both player and coach, representing Albania in the broader European and world chess scene.

== Legal career ==
Alongside his involvement in chess, Zadrima has also pursued a career in law. He is recognized as a jurist in Albania and has served in judicial roles. Some sources also note his engagement in sports arbitration within the Albanian National Olympic Committee (KOKSH), although further reliable citations are required for verification.

== See also ==
- Chess Olympiad
