= Erald Dervishi =

Albanian chess grandmaster (born 1979)

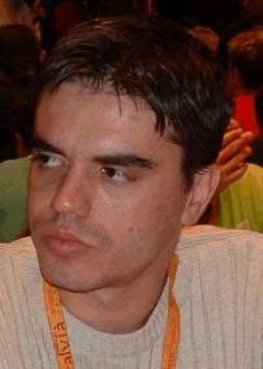
- Erald Dervishi, 2004

Personal information
- Born: 10 November 1979 (age 46) Durrës, People's Socialist Republic of Albania

Chess career
- Country: Albania
- Title: Grandmaster (1998)
- FIDE rating: 2520 (July 2026)
- Peak rating: 2582 (April 2014)

Erald Dervishi (born 10 November 1979) is an Albanian chess grandmaster. He is a two-time Albanian Chess Champion.

== Chess career ==
Born in 1979, Dervishi won the Albanian Chess Championship in 1996 and 1997. He earned his grandmaster title in 1998, becoming the first Albanian to achieve the title. He was awarded the Grand Master of Work Order by Albanian President Bujar Nishani in May 2017. In 2017, he won the 5th Francophonie Championship with a score of 7.5/9.

He is the No. 1 ranked Albanian player as of July 2022.
