= Olafur Magnússon =

Icelandic chess player (born 1939)

Personal information
- Born: 1939 (age 86–87)

Chess career
- Country: Iceland

Olafur Magnússon (born 1939) is an Icelandic chess player, and two-time winner of the Icelandic Chess Championship (1970, 1973).

== Biography ==
From the beginning of the 1960s to the mid-1970s Olafur Magnússon was one of the leading Icelandic chess players. He twice won the Icelandic Chess Championships: in 1970 after play-off against Ingvar Ásmundsson (4:2) and in 1973 after play-off against Magnús Sólmundarson (5:4).

Olafur Magnússon played for Iceland in the Chess Olympiads:

- In 1960, at fourth board in the 14th Chess Olympiad in Leipzig (+3, =5, -8),
- In 1970, at fourth board in the 19th Chess Olympiad in Siegen (+3, =5, -2),
- In 1972, at second reserve board in the 20th Chess Olympiad in Skopje (+5, =4, -2).
