= Bruce Amos =

Canadian chess player (born 1946)

Personal information
- Born: December 30, 1946 (age 79) Toronto, Ontario, Canada

Chess career
- Country: Canada
- Title: International Master (1969)
- Peak rating: 2460 (July 1971)

Bruce Murray Amos (born December 30, 1946) is a Canadian chess master.

== Biography ==
Amos was awarded the International Master title in 1969 for his tied 4th-5th place finish at the Canadian Chess Championship Zonal at Pointe Claire; Duncan Suttles and Zvonko Vranesic shared the top spots. Amos played twice more in Canadian Zonals. At Toronto 1972, he scored 9/17, for a shared 9–11th place, and at Calgary 1975, he scored 9/15 for a shared 5–7th place; Peter Biyiasas won both events.

Amos represented Canada three times at Chess Olympiads. He won the silver medal on board two at the 1971 Student Olympiad at Mayagüez, Puerto Rico; the team won the bronze medal. In 49 international team games in the four events, he scored (+23 =20 –6), for 67.3 percent.

- Siegen 1970 Olympiad, 1st reserve, 9/13 (+7 =4 –2)
- Mayagüez 1971 Student Olympiad, board 2, 8/11 (+6 =4 –1)
- Skopje 1972 Olympiad, 1st reserve, 10.5/15 (+6 =9 –0);
- Haifa 1976 Olympiad, board 4, 5.5/10 (+4 =3 –3), Canada placed 8th, its best-ever finish.

Amos narrowly missed a grandmaster result when he placed 3rd with 11/15, ahead of several grandmasters, at Reykjavík 1970; Guðmundur Sigurjónsson won. He played in the 1973 Canadian Open and U.S. Open. After 1976, Amos largely withdrew from competitive chess in favour of Go, the Oriental board game, and became a top-ranking amateur player. An alumnus of the University of Toronto, he completed graduate studies in mathematics at Yale University.

Amos's game against future world champion Anatoly Karpov at Mayagüez 1971 was annotated by Karpov in a published game collection.
