= Vangjel Adhami =

Albanian chess player (born 1948)

Personal information
- Born: March 23, 1948 (age 78)

Chess career
- Country: Albania
- Peak rating: 2335 (January 1980)

Vangjel Adhami (born 1948) is an Albanian chess player, five-times Albanian Chess Championship winner (1966, 1971, 1972, 1985, 2000).

== Biography ==
From the begin to 1970s to the begin 2000s Vangjel Adhami was one of Albania's leading chess players. He five times won Albanian Chess Championship: 1966, 1971, 1972, 1985, and 2000.

Vangjel Adhami played for Albania in the Chess Olympiads:

- In 1970, at fourth board in the 19th Chess Olympiad in Siegen (+5, =2, -4),
- In 1972, at third board in the 20th Chess Olympiad in Skopje (+3, =3, -0),
- In 1980, at second board in the 24th Chess Olympiad in La Valletta (+4, =3, -3),
- In 1988, at first reserve board in the 28th Chess Olympiad in Thessaloniki (+1, =1, -2),
- In 2000, at second board in the 34th Chess Olympiad in Istanbul (+1, =2, -5).

Vangjel Adhami played for Albania in the European Team Chess Championship preliminaries:

- In 1977, at second board in the 6th European Team Chess Championship preliminaries (+2, =0, -1).

Vangjel Adhami played for Albania in the Men's Chess Balkaniads:

- In 1980, at second board in the 12th Chess Balkaniad in Istanbul (+0, =3, -2),
- In 1993, at second board in the 24th Chess Balkaniad in Ankara (+0, =1, -3).
