= Ehsan Ghaem Maghami =

Iranian chess grandmaster (born 1982)

Ehsan Ghaem-Maghami
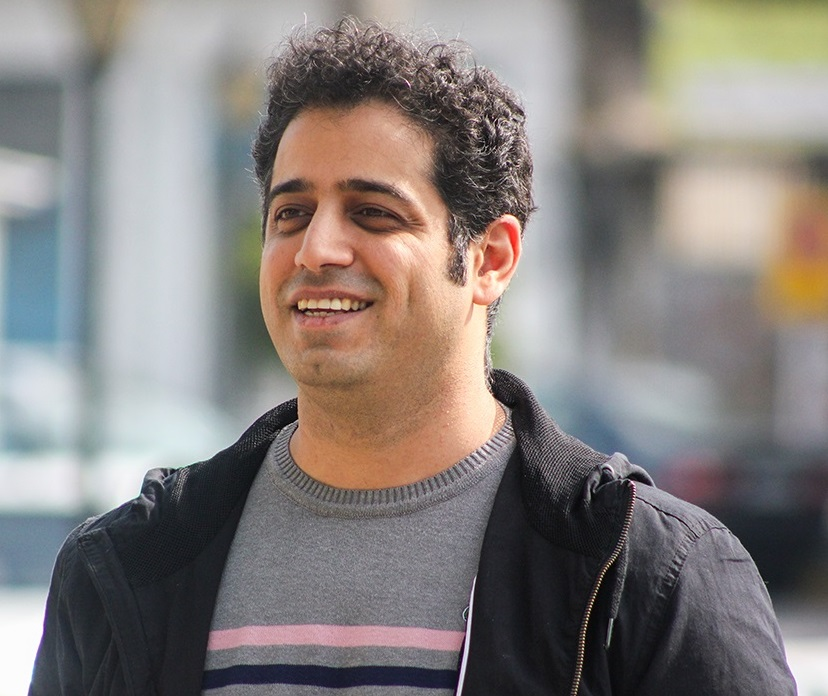
- Ghaem-Maghami in 2018

Personal information
- Born: 11 August 1982 (age 43) Tehran, Iran

Chess career
- Country: Iran
- Title: Grandmaster (2000)
- FIDE rating: 2445 (July 2026)
- Peak rating: 2633 (April 2005)
- Peak ranking: No. 67 (April 2005)

Ehsan Ghaem-Maghami (Persian: احسان قائم‌مقامی; born 11 August 1982) is an Iranian chess grandmaster (2000). He is the record holder of the Iranian Chess Championship with 13 titles.

On the September 2011 FIDE list, he had an Elo rating of 2583.

In 2004, he finished first in the Kish GM Tournament. In 2009, he won a 20-game combined match (four classical, four rapid and twelve blitz games) against Anatoly Karpov, played with the proviso that each game be played to mate or dead draw. The overall score was eight wins to Ghaem-Maghami, seven wins to Karpov, and five draws. In 2011, he finished first in the 10th Avicenna International Open Tournament in Hamadan, Iran.

== Early life ==
Ehsan was born in Tehran and learned to play chess from his father. He won the Iranian men's championship title aged 14.

== Career achievements ==
He was the first International Grandmaster in Iranian chess history.

He was Captain and player of the 1st board in Iran chess national team for the previous 14 years, and held the Iranian championship title at different ages.

== Guinness World Record ==
An Iranian grandmaster, he ousted the Israeli title holder on 9 February 2011 to regain the Guinness record for simultaneous chess games after facing more than 600 players in over 25 hours.

Ehsan Ghaem-Maghami, then 28 years old, won 97.35 percent of his games which began on 2011/02/08 in Tehran's Shahid Beheshti University, a feat reportedly making him the new Guinness title holder of the game.

Of the total 604 games, Ghaem-Maghami won 580, lost 8 and drew 16 in a feat that took more than 25 hours and treading around 55 kilometres (34 mi) as he moved from opponent to opponent. "I am so happy to break the record" a victorious yet exhausted Ehsan remarked, adding "but now I have to break my sleep record". Reportedly, a physician, a masseur and a dietician were monitoring him throughout the match. He said he would have put in the same zeal even if the previous title holder was a non-Israeli. "Iran is great and deserves the best. Let's not talk politics ... even if this record was held by another person, I would have gone all out to break it," he said after the matches when asked about ousting Israeli Alik Gershon.

== Chess career ==
In October 2011, Ehsan Ghaem-Maghami was expelled from the Corsica Masters in Bastia, France for refusing to play in his scheduled match against Israeli player Ehud Shachar. Ghaem-Maghami told organizers he would not play the Israeli for political reasons. The Islamic Republic of Iran has long refused to engage in sporting competition against Israel.

In 2013 he played against British Grandmaster Nigel Short in Tehran.
