= Ghazal Hakimifard =

Iranian-Swiss chess player (born 1994)

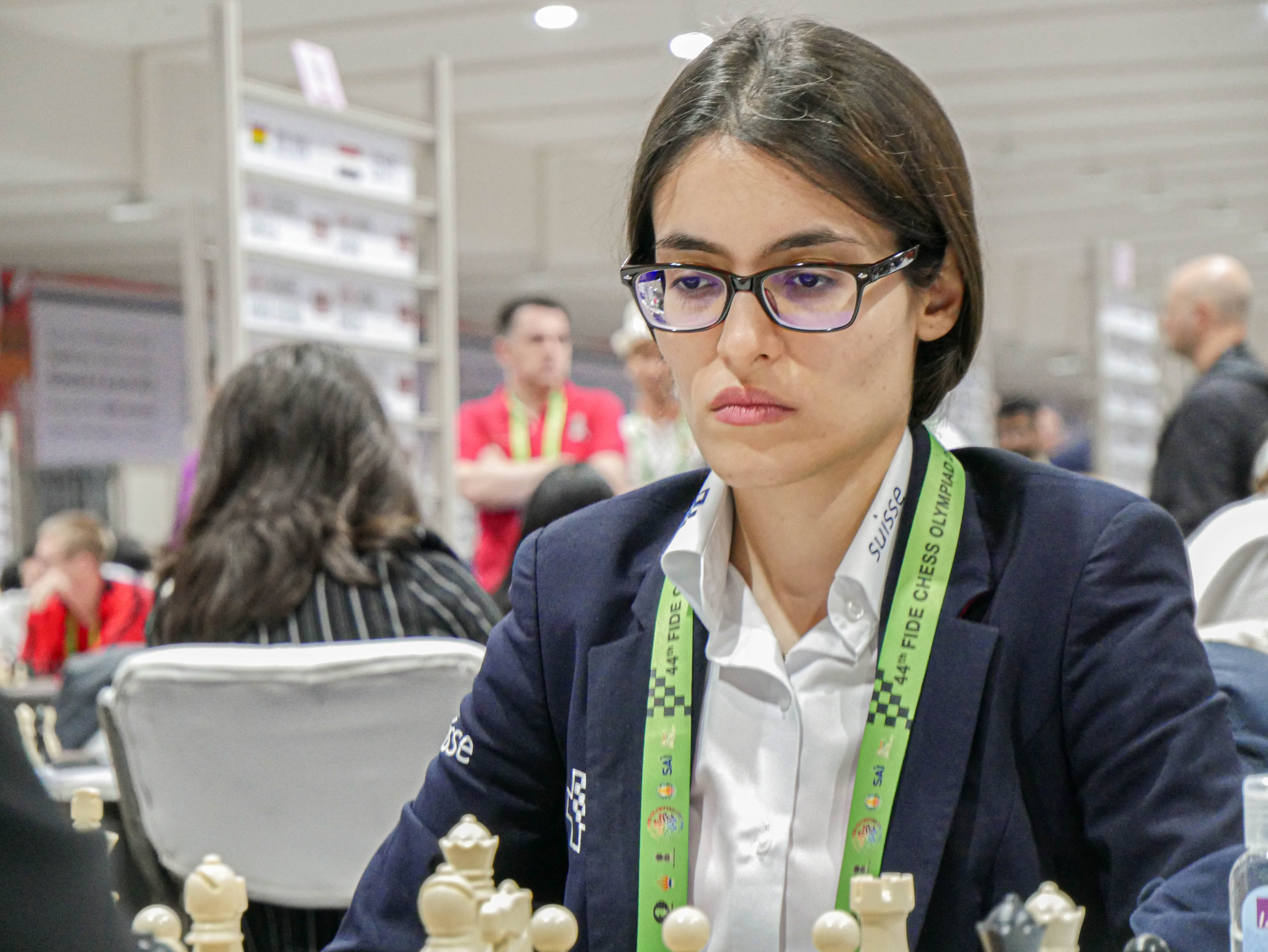

Personal information
- Born: 14 April 1994 (age 32)

Chess career
- Country: Iran (until May 2020); Switzerland (since June 2020)
- Title: Woman Grandmaster (2016)
- Peak rating: 2308 (September 2016)

Ghazal Hakimifard (Persian: غزل حکیمی‌فرد; born 14 April 1994) is an Iranian chess player who holds the FIDE title of Woman Grandmaster (WGM, 2016). She is an Iranian Women's Chess Championship winner (2010).

== Biography ==
In 2007, Hakimifard won bronze medal in Asian Youth Chess Championship in U14 girl's age group. She is multiple medalist of Iranian Women's Chess Championship: gold (2010), silver (2012) and bronze (2011).

She played for Iran in the Women's Chess Olympiads:

- In 2010, at reserve board in the 39th Chess Olympiad (women) in Khanty-Mansiysk (+5, =0, -2),
- In 2012, at fourth board in the 40th Chess Olympiad (women) in Istanbul (+6, =2, -0),
- In 2014, at fourth board in the 41st Chess Olympiad (women) in Tromsø (+5, =0, -2),
- In 2016, at fourth board in the 42nd Chess Olympiad (women) in Baku (+5, =4, -1).

Hakimifard played for Iran and Iran 2 teams in the Women's Asian Team Chess Championships:

- In 2005, at first reserve board in the 4th Asian Team Chess Championship (women) in Isfahan (+2, =1, -1) and won team bronze medal,
- In 2014, at fourth board in the 8th Asian Women's Nations Chess Cup in Tabriz (+0, =2, -1) and won team bronze medal.

She played for Iran in the Asian Games:

- In 2010, at fourth board in the 16th Asian Games (chess - women) in Guangzhou (+2, =2, -1).

In 2011, Hakimifard received the FIDE Woman International Master (WIM) title, and in 2016, she received the FIDE Woman Grandmaster (WGM) title.
