= Josef Přibyl (chess player) =

Czech chess player (1947–2026)

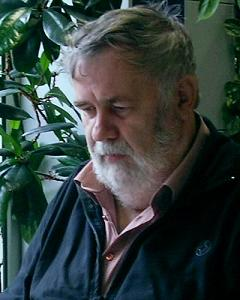
- Přibyl in 2010

Personal information
- Born: 12 October 1947 Prague, Czechoslovakia
- Died: 29 June 2026 (aged 78)

Chess career
- Country: Czechoslovakia; Czech Republic
- Title: International Master (1972)
- Peak rating: 2485 (January 1977)

Josef Přibyl (12 October 1947 – 29 June 2026) was a Czech chess International Master (IM) (1972) and Czechoslovak Chess Championship medalist (1971, 1972, 1980, 1982, 1983).

== Biography ==
From the early 1970s to the early 1980s, Josef Přibyl was one of the leading Czechoslovak chess players. He was a multiple participant in the Czechoslovak Chess Championships, where he won silver (1983) and four bronze (1971, 1972, 1980, 1982) medals. Josef Přibyl was winner of many international chess tournament awards, including first or shared first place in Starý Smokovec (1976), IBM international chess tournament - B (1976), Olomouc (1982), Tapolca (1986), Lázně Bohdaneč (1997), Tatrzańskie Zręby (2005). In 1972, he was awarded the FIDE International Master (IM) title.

Přibyl played for Czechoslovakia in the Chess Olympiads:

- In 1970, at first reserve board in the 19th Chess Olympiad in Siegen (+1, =5, -0),
- In 1972, at first reserve board in the 20th Chess Olympiad in Skopje (+2, =2, -4),
- In 1974, at fourth board in the 21st Chess Olympiad in Nice (+7, =8, -2).

He played for Czechoslovakia in the European Team Chess Championships:

- In 1970, at ninth board in the 4th European Team Chess Championship in Kapfenberg (+1, =4, -1),
- In 1977, at fifth board in the 6th European Team Chess Championship in Moscow (+1, =4, -2),
- In 1980, at second reserve board in the 7th European Team Chess Championship in Skara (+1, =1, -2).

Přibyl died on 29 June 2026, at the age of 78.
