= Elisabeth Pähtz =

German chess grandmaster (born 1985)

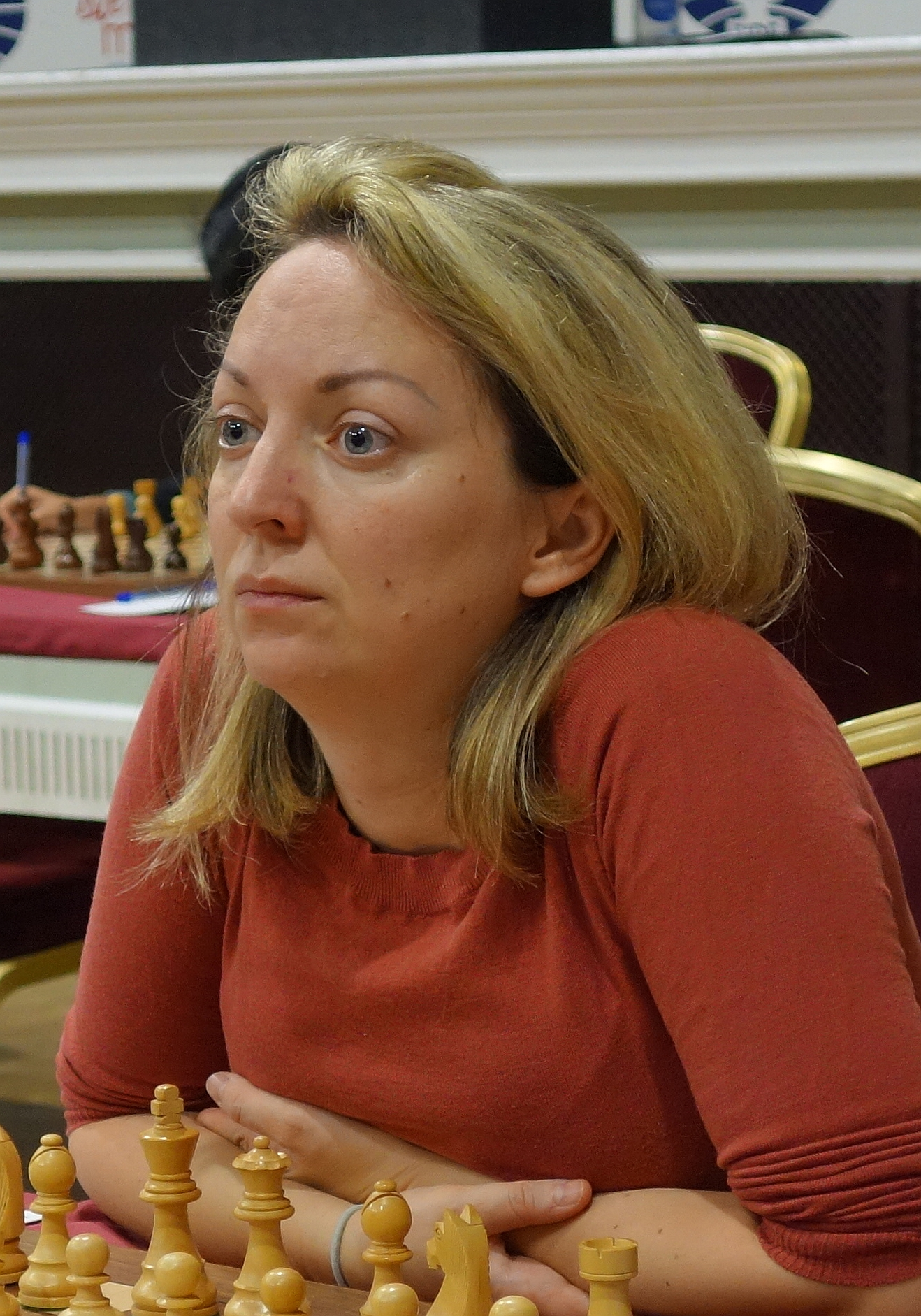
- Pähtz at the 2023 FIDE Women's Grand Swiss Tournament

Personal information
- Born: January 8, 1985 (age 41) Erfurt, East Germany
- Spouse: Luca Shytaj (m. 2015; sep. 2018)

Chess career
- Country: Germany
- Title: Grandmaster (2022)
- FIDE rating: 2404 (August 2026)
- Peak rating: 2513 (September 2018)

Elisabeth Pähtz (born January 8, 1985, sometimes spelt Elisabeth Paehtz) is a chess player, who in 2022 became the first German woman, and the 40th woman in history, to be awarded the title of grandmaster.

She has been among the strongest German female chess players since her youth. In 2002, Pähtz became the World Youth Champion of the girls' under-18 age group, and in 2005, the World Junior Girls Champion.

She won the 2018 European Women's Championship in rapid chess. In 2021, she scored what was reported to be her third grandmaster norm; however, the validity of one of her earlier presumed norms was in doubt. After a lengthy process, FIDE made an individual decision on her case in December 2022.

== Early life ==
Pähtz was born in 1985 in Erfurt, Germany. Her father, Thomas Pähtz, is a chess grandmaster and played chess with his daughter from a young age on. At the age of nine years she won her first German championship, in the under-11 age group. In 1999 she became Germany's women's chess champion. She served as one of four advisors on the World team in the 1999 Kasparov versus The World chess match.

Pähtz attended the Sport High School Dresden until 2004 where she was awarded her Abitur diploma in 2005. She plays - among others - for the Dresdner Sport Club 1898 in the German women's league and for the SC Kreuzberg in the German chess men's league. As one of the strongest German female talents, Pähtz was the subject of media interest when growing up and was featured in a multitude of television shows. After High School she enlisted in the Bundeswehr, as part of the army's sports promotion group.

In September 2015 she married Italian GM Luca Shytaj. They separated in 2018.

== International career ==
In 2002 Pähtz became the World Youth Champion of the girls' under-18 age group, and in 2005 the World Junior Girls Champion.

She has played for Germany in 10 women's chess olympiads between 1998 and 2016. She also played for Germany in the women's World Team Chess Championship in 2007, scoring +2 =6 -0 for which she won the individual bronze medal on board one. She has also played for Germany in nine women's European Team Chess Championships between 1999 and 2015. She won the individual bronze medal on board two in 2001 with a score of +3 =4 -1 at León, Spain.

In 2017 she won the bronze medal in the women's World Rapid Chess Championship in Riyadh.

Pähtz won the 2018 European Women's Championship in rapid chess and was the runner-up in the respective blitz chess tournament. Her performance in classic chess was also very strong and she entered the top 10 in the women's FIDE world rankings in September 2018.

In 2019 she won the bronze medal in the women's European Individual Chess Championship.

In November 2021 she finished second in the FIDE Women's Grand Swiss Tournament, scoring a grandmaster norm. Three norms are needed to become a grandmaster, and Pähtz has a previous norm from 2011, and another possible norm from 2016. Her 2016 result was initially considered to be a GM norm by the tournament's referee and the then-leader of the FIDE Title Commission, Werner Stubenvoll. However, after Pähtz' 2021 norm and the official application for a GM title in early 2022, Stubenvoll reversed his position, and the Title Commission recommended not to accept her 2016 result as a norm, as she only had two GM opponents instead of the three required for a norm. It was reported in May 2022 that the FIDE Council deferred the decision whether Pähtz will receive the grandmaster title or not. After a decision in December 2022, Pähtz was awarded the title.
