= Rauli Gostowski =

Finnish chess player

Personal information
- Born: 24 May 1946 (age 80)

Chess career
- Country: Finland

Rauli Gostowski (born 24 May 1946) is a Finnish chess player, Finnish Chess Championship medalist (1969).

== Biography ==
From the end of 1960s to the begin 1970s, Rauli Gostowski was one of Finland's leading chess players. In Finnish Chess Championships he has won bronze medal in 1969.

Rauli Gostowski played for Finland in the Chess Olympiad:

- In 1970, at second reserve board in the 19th Chess Olympiad in Siegen (+2, =3, -2).

Rauli Gostowski played for Finland in the European Team Chess Championship preliminaries:

- In 1973, at fifth board in the 5th European Team Chess Championship preliminaries (+1, =1, -3).
