= Mendim Veizaj =

Albanian chess player

Personal information
- Born: unknown
- Died: unknown

Chess career
- Country: Albania

Mendim Veizaj (unknown – unknown) was an Albanian chess player, Albanian Chess Championship winner (1953).

== Biography ==
From the begin to 1950s to the end of 1970s Mendim Veizaj was one of Albania's leading chess players. In 1953, he won Albanian Chess Championship.

Mendim Veizaj played for Albania in the Chess Olympiads:

- In 1960, at fourth board in the 14th Chess Olympiad in Leipzig (+2, =4, -7),
- In 1962, at fourth board in the 15th Chess Olympiad in Varna (+5, =2, -5).

Mendim Veizaj played for Albania in the Men's Chess Balkaniads:

- In 1979, at sixth board in the 11th Chess Balkaniad in Bihać (+1, =0, -2).
