= Mohammad Hossein Farboud =

Iranian chess player

Personal information
- Born: unknown
- Died: unknown

Chess career
- Country: Iran

Mohammad Hossein Farboud was an Iranian chess player. He was one of the leading Iranian chess players in the 1960s. He won the Iranian Chess Championship in 1967 and 1968. He played for Iran in the Chess Olympiads in 1962, at the second board in the 15th Chess Olympiad in Varna (+3, =6, -10). He again played in 1964, as the first reserve board in the 16th Chess Olympiad in Tel Aviv (+3, =1, -4).
