= Khosro Harandi =

Iranian chess player (1950–2019)

Khosro Sheikh Harandi
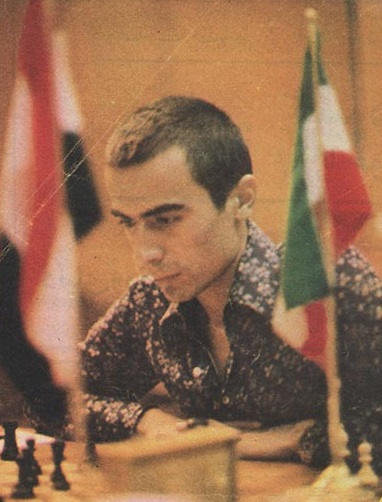
- 1974 West Asian chess championship, Tehran

Personal information
- Born: 1 September 1950 Tehran, Pahlavi Iran
- Died: 8 January 2019 (aged 68) Tehran, Iran

Chess career
- Country: Iran
- Title: International Master (1975)
- Peak rating: 2430 (January 1988)

Khosro (Hosrov) Sheikh Harandi (Persian: خسرو هرندی; 1 September 1950 – 8 January 2019) was the first Iranian chess International Master and 3-time Iran chess champion. He was a member of the national team in five Chess Olympiads.

- In 1970, at fourth board in 19th Chess Olympiad in Siegen (+6 –3 =10);
- In 1972, at first board in 20th Chess Olympiad in Skopje (+8 –3 =11);
- In 1974, at first board in 21st Chess Olympiad in Nice (+10 –6 =4);
- In 1976, at second board in 22nd Chess Olympiad in Haifa (+5 –3 =5);
- In 1990, at first board in 29th Chess Olympiad in Novi Sad (+4 –3 =6).

He represented Iran at first board in 19th World Student Team Chess Championship at Graz 1972 (+6 –3 =3).

Harandi won twice zonal FIDE tournaments held in Tehran (1975 and 1978). He tied for 18-20th at Manila 1976 (interzonal; Henrique Mecking won). In 1977, he tied for 1st-3rd in Netanya. In 1978, he tied for 4-5th in Baguio. In 1979, he took 15th place (drew with Huebner & Timman as well as scored a victory over Sax) in Rio de Janeiro (interzonal; Lajos Portisch, Tigran Petrosian and Robert Hübner won).

He was awarded the International Master title in 1975 and FIDE Senior Trainer title in 2009.
