= Teodor Siliqi =

Albanian chess player

Personal information
- Born: March 23, 1931
- Died: March 3, 2011 (aged 79)

Chess career
- Country: Albania

Teodor Siliqi (March 23, 1931 – March 3, 2011) was an Albanian chess player, Albanian Chess Championship winner (1948).

== Biography ==
From the mid-1940s to the begin of 1960s Teodor Siliqi was one of Albania's leading chess players. In 1948, he shared 1st—2nd place with Skënder Çarçani in Albanian Chess Championship.

Teodor Siliqi played for Albania in the Chess Olympiad:

- In 1962, at first reserve board in the 15th Chess Olympiad in Varna (+5, =3, -3).

Teodor Siliqi played for Albania in the World Student Team Chess Championship:

- In 1958, at fourth board in the 5th World Student Team Chess Championship in Varna (+4, =4, -2).
