= Rozana Gjergji (Çima) =

Albanian chess player (born 1975)

Personal information
- Born: 17 September 1975 (age 50) Albania

Chess career
- Country: Albania
- Title: Woman FIDE Master (2022)
- Peak rating: 2055 (January 2000)

Rozana Gjergji (Çima) is an Albanian chess player.

== Career ==
She is a seven-time female Albanian chess champion.
