= Magnús Sólmundarson =

Icelandic chess player (born 1939)

Personal information
- Born: 14 November 1939 (age 86)

Chess career
- Country: Iceland
- Peak rating: 2390 (July 1972)

Magnús Sólmundarson (born 14 November 1939) is an Icelandic chess player. He is an Icelandic Chess Championship medalist (1973).

== Biography ==
From the mid-1960s to the mid-1970s Magnús Sólmundarson was one of the leading Icelandic chess players. He has regularly participated in Icelandic Chess Championships, where he won the silver medal in 1973 after losing in the play-off against Olafur Magnússon, and Reykjavík International Chess tournaments (1964, 1972, 1974, 1982).

Magnús Sólmundarson played for Iceland in the Chess Olympiads:

- In 1964, at first reserve board in the 16th Chess Olympiad in Tel Aviv (+5, =3, -3),
- In 1970, at first reserve board in the 19th Chess Olympiad in Siegen (+5, =3, -3),
- In 1972, at fourth board in the 20th Chess Olympiad in Skopje (+8, =4, -5),
- In 1976, at fourth board in the 22nd Chess Olympiad in Haifa (+4, =2, -3).

Magnús Sólmundarson played for Iceland in the European Team Chess Championship preliminaries:

- In 1983, at eighth board in the 8th European Team Chess Championship preliminaries (+0, =0, -1).

Magnús Sólmundarson played for Iceland in the Nordic Chess Cups:

- In 1974, at fourth board in the 5th Nordic Chess Cup in Eckernförde (+0, =4, -1) and won team bronze medal,
- In 1976, at fourth board in the 7th Nordic Chess Cup in Bremen (+2, =2, -1).

Also Magnús Sólmundarson has successfully participated in correspondence chess tournaments and won the Icelandic Correspondence Chess Championship (1991–1993).
