= Hasan Abbasifar =

Iranian-Spanish chess grandmaster (born 1972)

Personal information
- Born: August 11, 1972 (age 53) Shiraz, Iran

Chess career
- Country: Iran (until 2023); Spain (since 2023)
- Title: Grandmaster (2013)
- Peak rating: 2506 (April 2013)

Hasan Abbasifar (Persian: حسن عباسی‌فر; born 11 August 1972) is an Iranian-Spanish chess grandmaster, titled in 2013. He was a member of the Iran chess national team.

== Awards ==
Hassan Abbassifar is the first international grandmaster of Shiraz and the province of Fars, where he won the 1990 and 1991 chess championship. In 1994, he managed to reach the final of the national championship, which allowed him to qualify as a member of the Iranian national chess team at the World Olympics in Russia. In 1994–95, he was placed second in the national semi-rapid championship.

During the 1999–2000 season, he beat the players in the Iranian league to win with a difference of 1.5 points over his runner-up. The same year, he participated in the student world championship in the Netherlands and won the gold medal for his personal performance on his chess board while playing for the national team at the Asian games in China.

In 2001, he was again a finalist in the Iranian championship which allowed him to be selected for the Olympiad. Once again crowned student chess champion, he participates in the world student championship in Malaysia .

== Other chess activities ==
Hassan Abbassifar coaches the Iranian national youth team in international tournaments in Turkey and India and at the Asian Games in Singapore. He headed the chess federation of the province of Fars for eight years, the province of which he created the first chess school. Hassan Abbassifar is also the author of several books on chess.

== Tournaments ==
- Karoun Masters Cup 2019
- 13th Dubai Open
- Aeroflot Open B
- Fajr op 14th
