= Ilir Seitaj =

Albanian chess player (born 1957)

Personal information
- Born: Ilir Seitaj Moscow, Russia

Chess career
- Country: Albania
- Title: International Master
- Peak rating: 2425 (July 1992)

Ilir Seitaj (born 1957) is an Albanian chess International Master. Seitaj has won the Albanian Chess Championship tournament four times (1983, 1991, 1999, and 2009).
