= Lennart Liljedahl =

Swedish chess player (born 1947)

Personal information
- Born: 27 August 1947 (age 78)

Chess career
- Country: Sweden

Lennart Liljedahl (born 27 August 1947), is a Swedish chess player, two-times Swedish Chess Championship medalist (1970, 1973).

== Biography ==
In the 1970s Lennart Liljedahl was one of the leading Swedish chess players. Lennart Liljedahl participated many times in the finals of Swedish Chess Championship and won two silver medals: 1970 and 1973.

Lennart Liljedahl played for Sweden in the Chess Olympiads:

- In 1970, at fourth board in the 19th Chess Olympiad in Siegen (+3, =3, -5),
- In 1972, at fourth board in the 20th Chess Olympiad in Skopje (+4, =8, -3),
- In 1974, at fourth board in the 21st Chess Olympiad in Nice (+4, =4, -6).

Lennart Liljedahl played for Sweden in the World Student Team Chess Championships:

- In 1970, at second board in the 17th World Student Team Chess Championship in Haifa (+2, =4, -3),
- In 1974, at second board in the 20th World Student Team Chess Championship in Teesside (+4, =4, -5).

Lennart Liljedahl played for Sweden in the Clare Benedict Cup:

- In 1974, at fourth board in the 21st Clare Benedict Chess Cup in Cala Galdana (+1, =4, -1).

Lennart Liljedahl played for Sweden in the Nordic Chess Cups:

- In 1971, at fourth board in the 2nd Nordic Chess Cup in Großenbrode (+1, =4, -0) and won team gold medal,
- In 1973, at sixt board in the 4th Nordic Chess Cup in Ribe (+0, =3, -2) and won team silver medal.
