= Houshang Mashian =

Iranian-Israeli chess player (born 1938)

Personal information
- Born: 17 December 1938 (age 87) Tehran, Iran

Chess career
- Country: Iran (until 1971); Switzerland (1972–1976); Israel (since 1977)
- Peak rating: 2293 (January 1999)

Houshang (Yaakov, Yaacov) Mashian (Persian: هوشنگ (یاکوف) مشیان; born 17 December 1938) is an Iranian-Israeli chess master.

Mashian won Iranian Chess Championship in 1958 and represented Iran in Chess Olympiads: at Munich 1958, Tel Aviv 1964 and Siegen 1970. He took 14th at Reggio Emilia 1970/71, an event won by Bruno Parma. Mashian emigrated to Israel in the middle of the 1970s.

In the Israeli Chess Championship at Tel Aviv 1980, he lost to Yedael Stepak after 24 hours and 30 minutes, consisting of 193 moves, in the world's longest decisive chess game as well as the world's longest in time.
