= Eglantina Shabanaj =

Albanian chess player (born 1979)

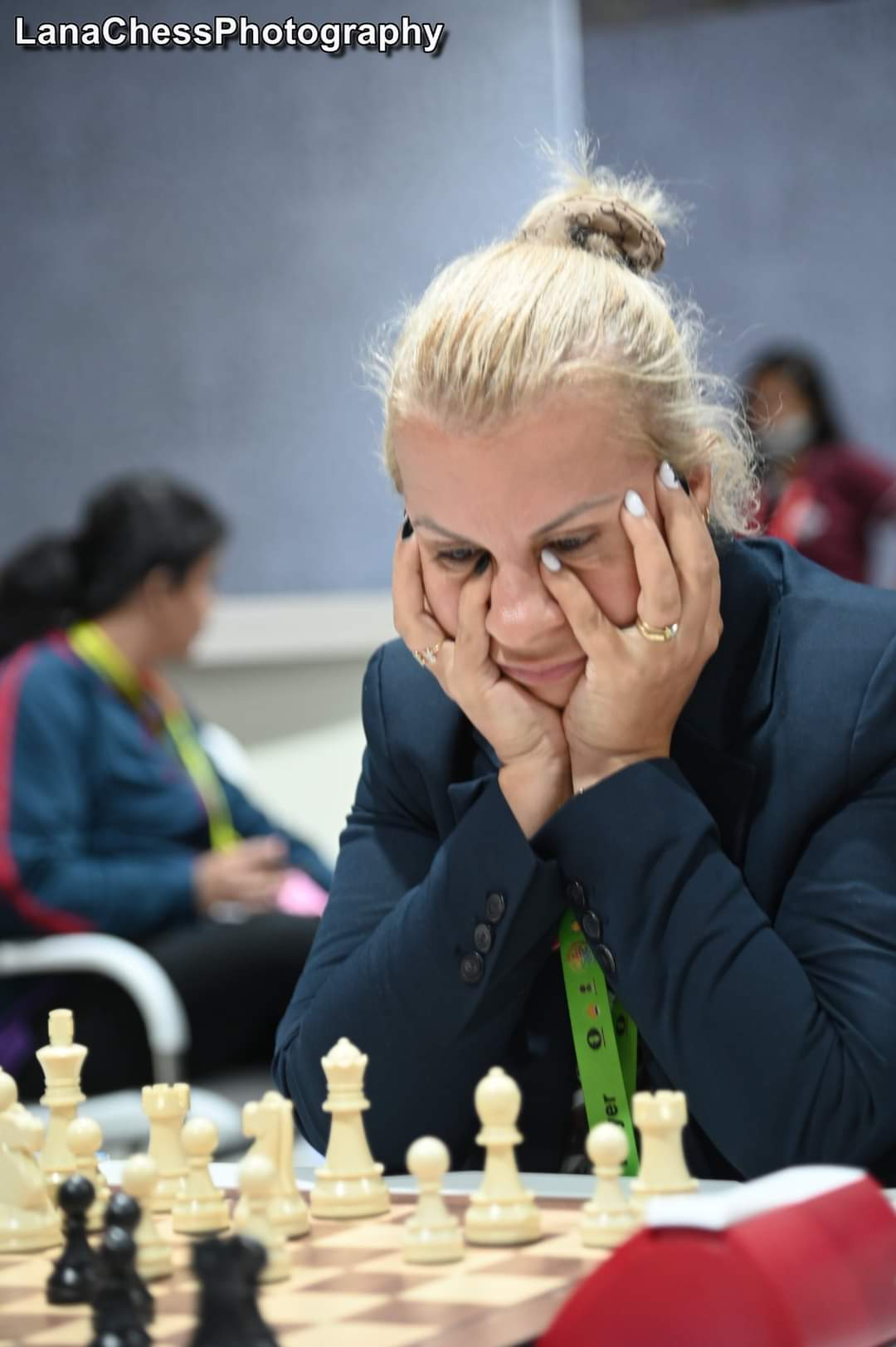

Personal information
- Born: 27 March 1979 (age 47) Tirana, Albania

Chess career
- Country: Albania
- Title: Woman FIDE Master (2025)
- Peak rating: 2176 (January 2000)

Eglantina Shabanaj (born 1979) is an Albanian chess player.

She earned the title of Woman FIDE Master (WFM) in 2025.

== Career ==
She won the women's section of the Albanian Chess Championship 14 times in the years 1994–1999, 2007, 2009, 2011, 2012, 2014, 2016, 2018 and 2019.

She has played for the Albania Chess Team in 10 Olympiads in the years 1994, 2000, 2006, 2008, 2010, 2014, 2016, 2018, 2022, 2024.

In the "2nd International Open Chess Tournament “Durrës 2014″ on 1–8 November 2014 in Durrës, Albania, WCM Eglantina Shabanaj (Albania) was ranked second female player of tournament.
