= Adaucto Nóbrega =

Brazilian chess player

Personal information
- Born: 18 February 1939 (age 87) São Bento do Sul, Brazil

Chess career
- Country: Brazil
- Title: FIDE Master (2010)
- Peak rating: 2340 (May 1974)

Adaucto Wanderley da Nóbrega (born 18 February 1939) is a Brazilian chess FIDE master (FM) and Brazilian Chess Championship medalist (1970, 1972).

== Biography ==
In the 1970s Nóbrega was one of Brazil's leading chess players. He won two medals in Brazilian Chess Championships: silver (1970) and bronze (1972).

Nóbrega played for Brazil in the Chess Olympiads:

- In 1970, at third board in the 19th Chess Olympiad in Siegen (+2, =4, -4)
- In 1972, at third board in the 20th Chess Olympiad in Skopje (+9, =3, -5)
- In 1974, at first reserve board in the 21st Chess Olympiad in Nice (+5, =7, -1)

In later years, Nóbrega actively participated in correspondence chess tournaments. In 1980, he was awarded the International Correspondence Chess Master (IM) title.

He is one of the founders of the Brazilian chess history site BrasilBase.
