= Roberto Cosulich =

Italian chess player (1946–1980)

Personal information
- Born: 30 July 1946 Venice, Italy
- Died: 1980 (aged 33–34) Peru

Chess career
- Country: Italy
- Title: FIDE Master (2001)
- Peak rating: 2430 (July 1973)

Roberto Cosulich (30 July 1946 – 1980) was an Italian chess player, FIDE Master (FM) (posthumously awarded in 2001), six time Italian Chess Championship silver medalist (1969, 1971, 1973, 1974, 1975, 1976).

== Chess career ==
Roberto Cosulich, born to a family of Istrian origin, grew up in South America where his father, a ship commander, was on business. Here he learned the game of chess and had as a teacher the International Grandmaster Hermann Pilnik. Returning to Italy in 1965 he quickly became one of the strongest Italian players, obtaining the title of National Master in 1966.

Gifted with great talent, he participated in tournaments mainly to earn some money. The reason for his numerous second places in Italian Chess Championships from 1969 to 1976 was precisely in his being satisfied with a safe placing – and prize money – rather than taking a risk for first place and then finding himself without the prize money.

Roberto Cosulich played for Italy in the Chess Olympiads:

- In 1970, at first reserve board in the 19th Chess Olympiad in Siegen (+7, =6, −1),
- In 1974, at fourth board in the 21st Chess Olympiad in Nice (+9, =4, −4).

In 1967 he won the 8th Italian Team Chess Championship with the Trieste chess club Società Scacchistica Triestina.

== Last years and disappearance ==
From the 1960s Cosulich abandoned his family and chess became his only means of support. Always in search of himself and strongly tempted by oriental philosophies, Cosulich lived day by day, in the hippie style of those years.

In 1977 Cosulich was investigated during the investigations into the Red Brigades. He was cleared quite quickly and, as soon as he got his passport back, he decided to leave for India. He returned after a year to leave for South America where he had grown up. There has been no news of him since. In 1980 the French chess magazine Europe Échecs reported to the director of L'Italia Scacchistica Giovanni Ferrantes about the discovery of the passport of a chess master named Cosulich in Peru, who would have been the victim of a natural disaster. The absolute lack of news after then suggests, despite the failure to find his body, that Cosulich died in that event.

In 2001, Roberto Cosulich was posthumously awarded the FIDE Master (FM) title.
