= Fatos Omari =

Albanian chess player

Personal information
- Born: unknown
- Died: unknown

Chess career
- Country: Albania

Fatos Omari (unknown – unknown) was an Albanian chess player, Albanian Chess Championship winner (1968).

== Biography ==
From the begin to 1960s to the mid-1970s Fatos Omari was one of Albania's leading chess players. In 1968, he won Albanian Chess Championship.

Fatos Omari played for Albania in the Chess Olympiads:

- In 1960, at first reserve board in the 14th Chess Olympiad in Leipzig (+6, =3, -4),
- In 1962, at second reserve board in the 15th Chess Olympiad in Varna (+3, =5, -3),
- In 1970, at first reserve board in the 19th Chess Olympiad in Siegen (+2, =5, -1),
- In 1972, at first reserve board in the 20th Chess Olympiad in Skopje (+1, =0, -0).

Fatos Omari played for Albania in the World Student Team Chess Championships:

- In 1958, at third board in the 5th World Student Team Chess Championship in Varna (+1, =3, -6).

In 2001, Fatos Omari participated in 1st European Senior Chess Championship.
