= Eqrem Konçi =

Albanian chess player (1937–1997)

Personal information
- Born: 1937
- Died: 1997 (aged 59–60)

Chess career
- Country: Albania

Eqrem Konçi (1937 – 1997) was an Albanian chess player, Albanian Chess Championship winner (1967), Chess Olympiad individual silver medalist (1970).

== Biography ==
In the 1960s and 1970s Eqrem Konçi was one of Albania's leading chess players. In 1965, in Tirana he won International Chess Tournament. In 1967, Eqrem Konçi won Albanian Chess Championship.

Eqrem Konçi played for Albania in the Chess Olympiads:

- In 1960, at third board in the 14th Chess Olympiad in Leipzig (+6, =6, -6).
- In 1962, at third board in the 15th Chess Olympiad in Varna (+6, =5, -3),
- In 1970, at second reserve board in the 19th Chess Olympiad in Siegen (+5, =4, -1) and won individual silver medal.

Due to the fact that Albanian policy was aimed at international isolation during Enver Hoxha's reign, the Albanian public was not informed about Konçi's success at the 1970 World Chess Olympiad.
