= Fatos Muço =

Albanian chess player

Personal information
- Born: April 17, 1949 (age 77)

Chess career
- Country: Albania
- Title: International Master (1982)
- Peak rating: 2460 (January 1991)

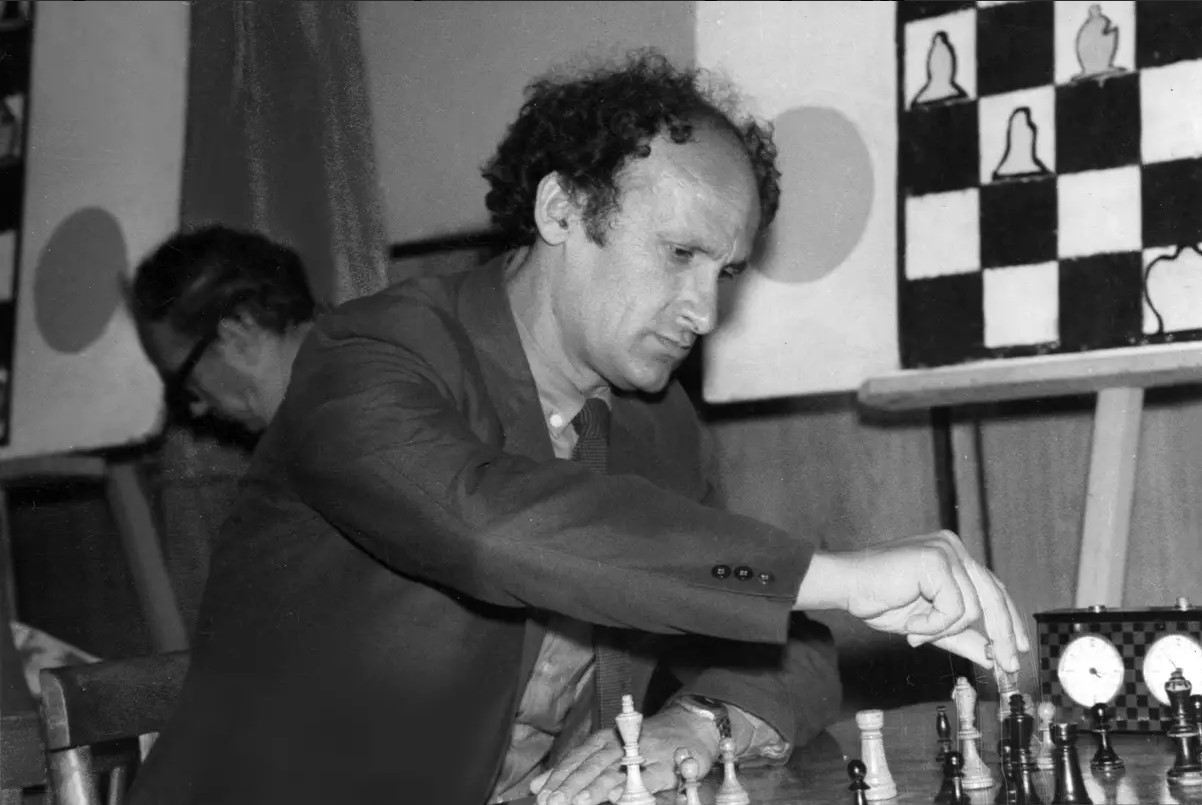

Fatos Muço (born 17 April 1949) is an Albanian chess player and International Master since 1982.

He is the record holder of Albania in terms of the number of gold medals won in individual national championships: between 1974 and 1989 he reached the highest podium 11 times. He has repeatedly represented Albania in team tournaments, including six times at the Chess Olympiads (in 1972, 1980, 1982, 1984, 1988, and 1990) and four times at the team championships of the Balkans (in 1979, 1980, 1982, and 1984). In 1989 he won the Acropolis B tournament in Athens.

He reached the highest chess ranking in his career on January 1, 1991, with 2460 points. He was then number one among Albanian chess players. Since 1996, he has not performed in tournaments classified by the International Chess Federation.
