= 17th Chess Olympiad =

1966 chess tournament in Havana, Cuba

The official poster for the Olympiad.

The 17th Chess Olympiad (Spanish: La 17^{a} Olimpíada de ajedrez), organized by FIDE and comprising an open team tournament, as well as several other events designed to promote the game of chess, took place between October 23 and November 20, 1966, in Havana, Cuba.

The Soviet team with 6 GMs, led by world champion Petrosian, lived up to expectations and won their eighth consecutive gold medals, with the United States and Hungary taking the silver and bronze, respectively.

When Hungary and Yugoslavia tied on both game and match points, and they had drawn 2–2 with each other, the rules dictated that the final ranking would be decided by using the Neustadtl score – but not which version of it. A so-called unweighted score was used, which placed Hungary ahead of Yugoslavia, giving them the bronze medals. Had the weighted variant been used instead, the result would have been the other way around.

== Results ==
=== Preliminaries ===
A total of 52 teams entered the competition and were divided into seven preliminary groups of seven or eight teams each. The top two from each group advanced to Final A, the teams placed 3rd-4th to Final B, no. 5-6 to Final C, and the rest to Final D. All preliminary groups and finals were played as round-robin tournaments. The preliminary results were as follows:

Group 1
| № | Country | 1 | 2 | 3 | 4 | 5 | 6 | 7 | 8 | + | − | = | Points |
|---|---|---|---|---|---|---|---|---|---|---|---|---|---|
| «A» | Soviet Union | - | 2½ | 3½ | 3½ | 3½ | 3½ | 4 | 4 | 7 | 0 | 0 | 24½ |
| «A» | Spain | 1½ | - | 3 | 2 | 3 | 4 | 3 | 4 | 5 | 1 | 1 | 20½ |
| «B» | Switzerland | ½ | 1 | - | 4 | 2½ | 3 | 3½ | 4 | 5 | 2 | 0 | 18½ |
| «B» | Sweden | ½ | 2 | 0 | - | 2½ | 3½ | 3 | 4 | 4 | 2 | 1 | 15½ |
| «C» | Philippines | ½ | 1 | 1½ | 1½ | - | 2½ | 2½ | 4 | 3 | 4 | 0 | 13½ |
| «C» | Uruguay | ½ | 0 | 1 | ½ | 1½ | - | 2 | 3½ | 1 | 5 | 1 | 9 |
| «D» | Monaco | 0 | 1 | ½ | 1 | 1½ | 2 | - | 1½ | 0 | 6 | 1 | 7½ |
| «D» | Hong Kong | 0 | 0 | 0 | 0 | 0 | ½ | 2½ | - | 1 | 6 | 0 | 3 |

Group 2
| № | Country | 1 | 2 | 3 | 4 | 5 | 6 | 7 | + | − | = | Points |
|---|---|---|---|---|---|---|---|---|---|---|---|---|
| «A» | Yugoslavia | - | 3½ | 3½ | 3½ | 3 | 4 | 3½ | 6 | 0 | 0 | 21 |
| «A» | Iceland | ½ | - | 1 | 3½ | 1½ | 3½ | 3½ | 3 | 3 | 0 | 13½ |
| «B» | Indonesia | ½ | 3 | - | 1½ | 2 | 2 | 3½ | 2 | 2 | 2 | 12½ |
| «B» | Austria | ½ | ½ | 2½ | - | 3 | 1½ | 4 | 3 | 3 | 0 | 12 |
| «C» | Turkey | 1 | 2½ | 2 | 1 | - | 2½ | 2 | 2 | 2 | 2 | 11 |
| «C» | Mongolia | 0 | ½ | 2 | 2½ | 1½ | - | 2½ | 2 | 3 | 1 | 9 |
| «D» | Mexico | ½ | ½ | ½ | 0 | 2 | 1½ | - | 0 | 5 | 1 | 5 |

Group 3
| № | Country | 1 | 2 | 3 | 4 | 5 | 6 | 7 | + | − | = | Points |
|---|---|---|---|---|---|---|---|---|---|---|---|---|
| «A» | United States | - | 1½ | 3 | 2 | 3½ | 3½ | 4 | 4 | 1 | 1 | 17½ |
| «A» | Norway | 2½ | - | 2 | 1½ | 4 | 3 | 3½ | 4 | 1 | 1 | 16½ |
| «B» | Poland | 1 | 2 | - | 3 | 3½ | 4 | 3 | 4 | 1 | 1 | 16½ |
| «B» | Israel | 2 | 2½ | 1 | - | 3 | 3 | 4 | 4 | 1 | 1 | 15½ |
| «C» | Ecuador | ½ | 0 | ½ | 1 | - | 2½ | 3 | 2 | 4 | 0 | 7½ |
| «C» | Portugal | ½ | 1 | 0 | 1 | 1½ | - | 2 | 0 | 5 | 1 | 6 |
| «D» | Bolivia | 0 | ½ | 1 | 0 | 1 | 2 | - | 0 | 5 | 1 | 4½ |

Group 4
| № | Country | 1 | 2 | 3 | 4 | 5 | 6 | 7 | + | − | = | Points |
|---|---|---|---|---|---|---|---|---|---|---|---|---|
| «A» | Argentina | - | 2½ | 3 | 3 | 4 | 4 | 4 | 6 | 0 | 0 | 20½ |
| «A» | Denmark | 1½ | - | 1½ | 3½ | 3½ | 4 | 4 | 4 | 2 | 0 | 18 |
| «B» | England | 1 | 2½ | - | 3 | 2½ | 3½ | 2½ | 5 | 1 | 0 | 15 |
| «B» | France | 1 | ½ | 1 | - | 2 | 2½ | 2½ | 2 | 3 | 1 | 9½ |
| «C» | Ireland | 0 | ½ | 1½ | 2 | - | 2½ | 1½ | 1 | 4 | 1 | 8 |
| «C» | Chile | 0 | 0 | ½ | 1½ | 1½ | - | 3½ | 1 | 5 | 0 | 7 |
| «D» | South Africa | 0 | 0 | 1½ | 1½ | 2½ | ½ | - | 1 | 5 | 0 | 6 |

Group 5
| № | Country | 1 | 2 | 3 | 4 | 5 | 6 | 7 | + | − | = | Points |
|---|---|---|---|---|---|---|---|---|---|---|---|---|
| «A» | Czechoslovakia | - | 2 | 3 | 4 | 4 | 4 | 4 | 5 | 0 | 1 | 21 |
| «A» | East Germany | 2 | - | 2½ | 3 | 3½ | 4 | 4 | 5 | 0 | 1 | 19 |
| «B» | Canada | 1 | 1½ | - | 4 | 3½ | 4 | 4 | 4 | 2 | 0 | 18 |
| «B» | Scotland | 0 | 1 | 0 | - | 2½ | 2½ | 3½ | 3 | 3 | 0 | 9½ |
| «C» | Italy | 0 | ½ | ½ | 1½ | - | 2½ | 3½ | 2 | 4 | 0 | 8½ |
| «C» | Luxembourg | 0 | 0 | 0 | 1½ | 1½ | - | 3½ | 1 | 5 | 0 | 6½ |
| «D» | Cyprus | 0 | 0 | 0 | ½ | ½ | ½ | - | 0 | 6 | 0 | 1½ |

Group 6
| № | Country | 1 | 2 | 3 | 4 | 5 | 6 | 7 | 8 | + | − | = | Points |
|---|---|---|---|---|---|---|---|---|---|---|---|---|---|
| «A» | Hungary | - | 3 | 2½ | 4 | 4 | 3 | 3½ | 3½ | 7 | 0 | 0 | 23½ |
| «A» | Cuba | 1 | - | 2 | 2½ | 3½ | 4 | 4 | 4 | 5 | 1 | 1 | 21 |
| «B» | Netherlands | 1½ | 2 | - | 2½ | 4 | 3½ | 3½ | 3½ | 5 | 1 | 1 | 20½ |
| «B» | Belgium | 0 | 1½ | 1½ | - | 2 | 2 | 3½ | 4 | 2 | 3 | 2 | 14½ |
| «C» | Venezuela | 0 | ½ | 0 | 2 | - | 2½ | 3½ | 4 | 3 | 3 | 1 | 12½ |
| «C» | Tunisia | 1 | 0 | ½ | 2 | 1½ | - | 3½ | 3 | 2 | 4 | 1 | 11½ |
| «D» | Panama | ½ | 0 | ½ | ½ | ½ | ½ | - | 4 | 1 | 6 | 0 | 6½ |
| «D» | Lebanon | ½ | 0 | ½ | 0 | 0 | 1 | 0 | - | 0 | 7 | 0 | 2 |

Group 7
| № | Country | 1 | 2 | 3 | 4 | 5 | 6 | 7 | 8 | + | − | = | Points |
|---|---|---|---|---|---|---|---|---|---|---|---|---|---|
| «A» | Romania | - | 2 | 2½ | 2½ | 3½ | 4 | 4 | 4 | 6 | 0 | 1 | 22½ |
| «A» | Bulgaria | 2 | - | 3 | 2 | 3 | 3½ | 4 | 4 | 5 | 0 | 2 | 21½ |
| «B» | Colombia | 1½ | 1 | - | 2½ | 2 | 2 | 4 | 4 | 3 | 2 | 2 | 17 |
| «B» | Finland | 1½ | 2 | 1½ | - | 2½ | 2 | 3½ | 4 | 3 | 2 | 2 | 17 |
| «C» | Greece | ½ | 1 | 2 | 1½ | - | 2 | 3 | 4 | 2 | 3 | 2 | 14 |
| «C» | Puerto Rico | 0 | ½ | 2 | 2 | 2 | - | 2 | 3½ | 1 | 2 | 4 | 12 |
| «D» | Morocco | 0 | 0 | 0 | ½ | 1 | 2 | - | 2½ | 1 | 5 | 1 | 6 |
| «D» | Nicaragua | 0 | 0 | 0 | 0 | 0 | ½ | 1½ | - | 0 | 7 | 0 | 2 |

=== Final ===
Final A
| # | Country | Players | Points | MP | Head- to-head | NS |
|---|---|---|---|---|---|---|
| 1 | Soviet Union | Petrosian, Spassky, Tal, Stein, Korchnoi, Polugaevsky | 39½ | | | |
| 2 | United States | Fischer, Byrne, Benko*, Evans, Addison, Rossolimo | 34½ | | | |
| 3 | Hungary | Portisch, Szabó, Bilek, Lengyel, Forintos, Bárczay | 33½ | 20 | 2 | 232.25 |
| 4 | Yugoslavia | Gligorić, Ivkov, Parma, Matanović, Matulović, Čirić | 33½ | 20 | 2 | 229.75 |
| 5 | Argentina | Najdorf, Panno, Bolbochán, Sanguineti, García, Schweber | 30 | | | |
| 6 | Czechoslovakia | Pachman, Hort, Filip, Kaválek, Jansa, Ujtelky* | 29½ | | | |
| 7 | Bulgaria | Minev, Bobotsov, Tringov, Padevsky, Kolarov, Popov | 28½ | | | |
| 8 | Romania | Gheorghiu, Ciocâltea, Ghițescu, Soós*, Drimer, Stanciu | 26½ | | | |
| 9 | East Germany | Uhlmann, Pietzsch, Fuchs, Malich, Zinn, Liebert | 25½ | | | |
| 10 | Denmark | Larsen, Brinck-Claussen, Andersen, Enevoldsen, Holm, Pedersen | 20 | | | |
| 11 | Iceland | Friðrik Ólafsson, Ingi Randver Jóhannsson, Guðmundur Pálmason, Freysteinn Thorbergsson, Gunnar Gunnarsson, Guðmundur Sigurjónsson | 19 | | | |
| 12 | Spain | Pomar, Medina García, Menvielle Laccourreye, Calvo, Franco Raymundo, Pérez Gonsalves | 18 | | | |
| 13 | Norway | Johannessen, Zwaig, Hoen, Kristiansen, De Lange, Wibe | 14 | | | |
| 14 | Cuba | Jiménez Zerquera, Ortega, Cobo Arteaga, Rodríguez Gonzáles, García Martínez, Santa Cruz | 12 | | | |

*HUN-born

Final B
| # | Country | Players | Points | MP |
|---|---|---|---|---|
| 15 | Netherlands | Bouwmeester, Prins, Zuidema, Langeweg, Ree, Kapsenberg G. | 37 | |
| 16 | Poland | Bednarski, Doda, Kostro, Śliwa, Balcerowski, Filipowicz | 31½ | |
| 17 | Austria | Prameshuber, Kinzel, Stoppel, Winiwarter, Janetschek, Schubirz | 30 | |
| 18 | Switzerland | Bhend, Walther, Blau, Roth, Glauser, Baumgartner | 28½ | 15 |
| 19 | Israel | Porat, Kraidman, Czerniak, Kagan, Aloni, Smiltiner | 28½ | 13 |
| 20 | Finland | Ojanen, Westerinen, Kanko, Rantanen, Lahti, Niemelä | 28 | |
| 21 | England | Clarke, Lee, Hartston, Littlewood, Hindle, Keene | 27½ | |
| 22 | Colombia | Cuartas, Alzate, de Greiff, Minaya Molano, Sánchez, Restrepo | 26½ | |
| 23 | Canada | Yanofsky, Vranesic, Witt, Suttles, Kalotay, Divinsky | 25½ | |
| 24 | Sweden | Johansson, Nilsson, Westman, Jansson, Kinnmark, Backström | 24½ | |
| 25 | Belgium | O'Kelly, Boey, Cornelis, Dunkelblum, Mollekens, Beyen | 23 | |
| 26 | France | Mazzoni, Boutteville, Ducic, Zinser, Huguet, Chiaramonti | 20 | |
| 27 | Indonesia | Bachtiar, Wotulo, Lim Hong Gie, Suwandhio, Hutagalung, Suradiradja | 18 | |
| 28 | Scotland | Fairhurst, Fallone, McAlpine, Pritchett, Freeman, Holmes H. D. | 15½ | |

Final C
| # | Country | Players | Points | MP |
|---|---|---|---|---|
| 29 | Italy | Tatai, Cappello, Zichichi, Romani, Norcia | 38 | |
| 30 | Mongolia | Myagmarsuren, Üitümen, Tsagan T., Zorigt, Badamgarav G., Chalkhasuren | 33½ | |
| 31 | Philippines | Naranja, De Castro, Balinas, Campomanes F., Viajar, Campomanes M. | 31 | |
| 32 | Greece | Vizantiadis, Ornithopoulos, Anastasopoulos, Bastas, Papapostolou, Kapralos | 29 | |
| 33 | Uruguay | Alvarez del Monte, Cabral, Olivera A., Olivera J. F., Elemberg, Vachini | 28 | |
| 34 | Tunisia | Belkadi, Bouaziz N., Kchouk, Ben Rehouma, Bouaziz S., Mohsen | 26½ | |
| 35 | Turkey | Süer, Bilyap, Onat, Erözbek, Külür, İbrahimoğlu | 25½ | |
| 36 | Venezuela | Schorr, Diaz, Villarroel, Caro, Hernández, Quintero | 25 | 12 |
| 37 | Portugal | Durão, Rocha, Cordovil, Ribeiro, Rego, Sardinha | 25 | 10 |
| 38 | Chile | Letelier, Larrain Cadaiz, Jiménez Rojas, Orpinas, Carrasco, Vergara | 23½ | 9 |
| 39 | Ecuador | Yépez Ol., Cevallos, Yepez Obando, Chonillo, Yépez Os., Calero | 23½ | 8 |
| 40 | Ireland | Heidenfeld, Cassidy R., Keogh, Reilly, Kerr, Cassidy P. | 21 | |
| 41 | Puerto Rico | Colón Romero A., Colón Romero M., Suárez Navas, Reissmann, Benítez, Kaplan | 18½ | |
| 42 | Luxembourg | Philippe, Schneider, Feller, Dietrich, Piscitelli, Greiveldinger | 16 | |

Final D
| # | Country | Players | Points | MP |
|---|---|---|---|---|
| 43 | South Africa | Dreyer, Kroon, Heyns, Hangelbroek, Price, Wilken | 28 | |
| 44 | Mexico | Iglesias, Acevedo, Araiza, Camarena, Delgado, Terrazas | 24½ | |
| 45 | Bolivia | García Soruco, Martínez Vaca, Salazar, Carvajal, Navarro | 22 | |
| 46 | Monaco | Casa, Weiss, Donné, Kostjoerin, Paris, Jezequelou | 20 | |
| 47 | Morocco | Bakali, Hadri, Bennis, Benabud, Kaderi, Bennouna | 19½ | |
| 48 | Nicaragua | Tenorio, Morales, Baca, Aguilar, Herdocia, Montalván | 17 | |
| 49 | Panama | Pérez, Ramón Martínez, Van der Hans, Rivera | 16½ | |
| 50 | Lebanon | Tarazi, Bedrossian, Galeb, Salameh, Daoud, Allam | 11 | 3 |
| 51 | Cyprus | Kleopas, Constantinou, Lantsias, Madelia, Chariklis | 11 | 2 |
| 52 | Hong Kong | Ko Chi, Sin Kuen, Krouk, Fung Yee Wang, Hobson | 10½ | |

=== Final «A» ===
| № | Country | 1 | 2 | 3 | 4 | 5 | 6 | 7 | 8 | 9 | 10 | 11 | 12 | 13 | 14 | + | − | = | Points |
|---|---|---|---|---|---|---|---|---|---|---|---|---|---|---|---|---|---|---|---|
| 1 | Soviet Union | - | 2½ | 2 | 2½ | 3 | 2½ | 3½ | 3 | 2½ | 4 | 3 | 3½ | 4 | 3½ | 12 | 0 | 1 | 39½ |
| 2 | United States | 1½ | - | 2 | 1½ | 3 | 2½ | 2 | 2 | 3 | 3½ | 3½ | 4 | 3 | 3 | 8 | 2 | 3 | 34½ |
| 3 | Hungary | 2 | 2 | - | 2 | 2 | 1½ | 2½ | 2½ | 2½ | 3½ | 3 | 3½ | 3 | 3½ | 8 | 1 | 4 | 33½ |
| 4 | Yugoslavia | 1½ | 2½ | 2 | - | 2 | 1½ | 2½ | 2½ | 3 | 3 | 3 | 3½ | 4 | 2½ | 9 | 2 | 2 | 33½ |
| 5 | Argentina | 1 | 1 | 2 | 2 | - | 2 | 2½ | 1½ | 3½ | 3 | 2½ | 2½ | 3 | 3½ | 7 | 3 | 3 | 30 |
| 6 | Czechoslovakia | 1½ | 1½ | 2½ | 2½ | 2 | - | 1 | 3 | 2 | 2 | 3 | 2½ | 3 | 3 | 7 | 3 | 3 | 29½ |
| 7 | Bulgaria | ½ | 2 | 1½ | 1½ | 1½ | 3 | - | 1½ | 2 | 2½ | 3 | 3 | 3½ | 3 | 6 | 5 | 2 | 28½ |
| 8 | Romania | 1 | 2 | 1½ | 1½ | 2½ | 1 | 2½ | - | 2½ | 2½ | 2 | 2 | 2 | 3½ | 5 | 4 | 4 | 26½ |
| 9 | East Germany | 1½ | 1 | 1½ | 1 | ½ | 2 | 2 | 1½ | - | 1½ | 3½ | 3 | 4 | 2½ | 4 | 7 | 2 | 25½ |
| 10 | Denmark | 0 | ½ | ½ | 1 | 1 | 2 | 1½ | 1½ | 2½ | - | 1 | 2½ | 2½ | 3½ | 4 | 8 | 1 | 20 |
| 11 | Iceland | 1 | ½ | 1 | 1 | 1½ | 1 | 1 | 2 | ½ | 3 | - | 1½ | 2½ | 2½ | 3 | 9 | 1 | 19 |
| 12 | Spain | ½ | 0 | ½ | ½ | 1½ | 1½ | 1 | 2 | 1 | 1½ | 2½ | - | 2 | 3½ | 2 | 9 | 2 | 18 |
| 13 | Norway | 0 | 1 | 1 | 0 | 1 | 1 | ½ | 2 | 0 | 1½ | 1½ | 2 | - | 2½ | 1 | 10 | 2 | 14 |
| 14 | Cuba | ½ | 1 | ½ | 1½ | ½ | 1 | 1 | ½ | 1½ | ½ | 1½ | ½ | 1½ | - | 0 | 13 | 0 | 12 |

=== Final «B» ===
| № | Country | 15 | 16 | 17 | 18 | 19 | 20 | 21 | 22 | 23 | 24 | 25 | 26 | 27 | 28 | + | − | = | Points |
|---|---|---|---|---|---|---|---|---|---|---|---|---|---|---|---|---|---|---|---|
| 15 | Netherlands | - | 2½ | 2½ | 1½ | 2½ | 3 | 2½ | 3½ | 3 | 3 | 3 | 3 | 3½ | 3½ | 12 | 1 | 0 | 37 |
| 16 | Poland | 1½ | - | 1½ | 3 | 2 | 1 | 1½ | 2 | 2½ | 3½ | 3 | 3 | 3 | 4 | 7 | 4 | 2 | 31½ |
| 17 | Austria | 1½ | 2½ | - | 2 | 2 | 2½ | 2 | 2½ | 2 | 1½ | 2½ | 3½ | 2 | 3½ | 6 | 2 | 5 | 30 |
| 18 | Switzerland | 2½ | 1 | 2 | - | 2½ | 2½ | 2 | 2 | 1½ | 4 | 2 | 1½ | 2 | 3 | 5 | 3 | 5 | 28½ |
| 19 | Israel | 1½ | 2 | 2 | 1½ | - | 1½ | 3 | 1 | 1½ | 2½ | 4 | 2 | 3 | 3 | 5 | 5 | 3 | 28½ |
| 20 | Finland | 1 | 3 | 1½ | 1½ | 2½ | - | 2½ | 2 | 3 | 3 | 1½ | 1½ | 3 | 2 | 6 | 5 | 2 | 28 |
| 21 | England | 1½ | 2½ | 2 | 2 | 1 | 1½ | - | 2 | 1½ | 2 | 2 | 3 | 3½ | 3 | 4 | 4 | 5 | 27½ |
| 22 | Colombia | ½ | 2 | 1½ | 2 | 3 | 2 | 2 | - | 2½ | 1 | 2 | 2½ | 3½ | 2 | 4 | 3 | 6 | 26½ |
| 23 | Canada | 1 | 1½ | 2 | 2½ | 2½ | 1 | 2½ | 1½ | - | 2½ | 1½ | 1½ | 3 | 2½ | 6 | 6 | 1 | 25½ |
| 24 | Sweden | 1 | ½ | 2½ | 0 | 1½ | 1 | 2 | 3 | 1½ | - | 2 | 3½ | 2½ | 3½ | 5 | 6 | 2 | 24½ |
| 25 | Belgium | 1 | 1 | 1½ | 2 | 0 | 2½ | 2 | 2 | 2½ | 2 | - | 2 | 2½ | 2 | 3 | 4 | 6 | 23 |
| 26 | France | 1 | 1 | ½ | 2½ | 2 | 2½ | 1 | 1½ | 2½ | ½ | 2 | - | 1½ | 1½ | 3 | 8 | 2 | 20 |
| 27 | Indonesia | ½ | 1 | 2 | 2 | 1 | 1 | ½ | ½ | 1 | 1½ | 1½ | 2½ | - | 3 | 2 | 9 | 2 | 18 |
| 28 | Scotland | ½ | 0 | ½ | 1 | 1 | 2 | 1 | 2 | 1½ | ½ | 2 | 2½ | 1 | - | 1 | 9 | 3 | 15½ |

=== Final «C» ===
| № | Country | 29 | 30 | 31 | 32 | 33 | 34 | 35 | 36 | 37 | 38 | 39 | 40 | 41 | 42 | + | − | = | Points |
|---|---|---|---|---|---|---|---|---|---|---|---|---|---|---|---|---|---|---|---|
| 29 | Italy | - | 2 | 3 | 4 | 2½ | 2½ | 3½ | 2½ | 2½ | 3 | 2½ | 3½ | 3 | 3½ | 12 | 0 | 1 | 38 |
| 30 | Mongolia | 2 | - | 1 | 3 | 3½ | 1½ | 2 | 3½ | 3 | 3 | 2½ | 3 | 3 | 2½ | 9 | 2 | 2 | 33½ |
| 31 | Philippines | 1 | 3 | - | 2 | 3 | 2½ | 2 | 1 | 2 | 3½ | 2½ | 1½ | 4 | 3 | 7 | 3 | 3 | 31 |
| 32 | Greece | 0 | 1 | 2 | - | 2½ | 2 | 2 | 2½ | 2½ | 2½ | 3 | 1½ | 3½ | 4 | 7 | 3 | 3 | 29 |
| 33 | Uruguay | 1½ | ½ | 1 | 1½ | - | 3½ | 3 | 3 | 2 | 2½ | 2 | 2 | 2 | 3½ | 5 | 4 | 4 | 28 |
| 34 | Tunisia | 1½ | 2½ | 1½ | 2 | ½ | - | 2 | 2½ | 2½ | 2½ | 2½ | 2 | 2½ | 2 | 6 | 3 | 4 | 26½ |
| 35 | Turkey | ½ | 2 | 2 | 2 | 1 | 2 | - | 1½ | 2½ | 1 | 3 | 2½ | 2½ | 3 | 5 | 4 | 4 | 25½ |
| 36 | Venezuela | 1½ | ½ | 3 | 1½ | 1 | 1½ | 2½ | - | 2 | 2 | 2 | 3 | 2 | 2½ | 4 | 5 | 4 | 25 |
| 37 | Portugal | 1½ | 1 | 2 | 1½ | 2 | 1½ | 1½ | 2 | - | 1½ | 2½ | 3 | 3 | 2 | 3 | 6 | 4 | 25 |
| 38 | Chile | 1 | 1 | ½ | 1½ | 1½ | 1½ | 3 | 2 | 2½ | - | ½ | 3½ | 1½ | 3½ | 4 | 8 | 1 | 23½ |
| 39 | Ecuador | 1½ | 1½ | 1½ | 1 | 2 | 1½ | 1 | 2 | 1½ | 3½ | - | 1 | 2½ | 3 | 3 | 8 | 2 | 23½ |
| 40 | Ireland | ½ | 1 | 2½ | 2½ | 2 | 2 | 1½ | 1 | 1 | ½ | 3 | - | 2 | 1½ | 3 | 7 | 3 | 21 |
| 41 | Puerto Rico | 1 | 1 | 0 | ½ | 2 | 1½ | 1½ | 2 | 1 | 2½ | 1½ | 2 | - | 2 | 1 | 8 | 4 | 18½ |
| 42 | Luxembourg | ½ | 1½ | 1 | 0 | ½ | 2 | 1 | 1½ | 2 | ½ | 1 | 2½ | 2 | - | 1 | 9 | 3 | 16 |

=== Final «D» ===
| № | Country | 43 | 44 | 45 | 46 | 47 | 48 | 49 | 50 | 51 | 52 | + | − | = | Points |
|---|---|---|---|---|---|---|---|---|---|---|---|---|---|---|---|
| 43 | South Africa | - | 2½ | 3 | 3 | 4 | 2 | 2½ | 4 | 4 | 3 | 8 | 0 | 1 | 28 |
| 44 | Mexico | 1½ | - | 2 | 2 | 3 | 3 | 3 | 2½ | 3½ | 4 | 6 | 1 | 2 | 24½ |
| 45 | Bolivia | 1 | 2 | - | 2½ | 2 | 2 | 3½ | 3½ | 2½ | 3 | 5 | 1 | 3 | 22 |
| 46 | Monaco | 1 | 2 | 1½ | - | 2 | 2 | 3 | 3 | 2½ | 3 | 4 | 2 | 3 | 20 |
| 47 | Morocco | 0 | 1 | 2 | 2 | - | 3½ | 2½ | 2½ | 3 | 3 | 5 | 2 | 2 | 19½ |
| 48 | Nicaragua | 2 | 1 | 2 | 2 | ½ | - | 2 | 1½ | 3 | 3 | 2 | 3 | 4 | 17 |
| 49 | Panama | 1½ | 1 | ½ | 1 | 1½ | 2 | - | 3½ | 2½ | 3 | 3 | 5 | 1 | 16½ |
| 50 | Lebanon | 0 | 1½ | ½ | 1 | 1½ | 2½ | ½ | - | 2 | 1½ | 1 | 7 | 1 | 11 |
| 51 | Cyprus | 0 | ½ | 1½ | 1½ | 1 | 1 | 1½ | 2 | - | 2 | 0 | 7 | 2 | 11 |
| 52 | Hong Kong | 1 | 0 | 1 | 1 | 1 | 1 | 1 | 2½ | 2 | - | 1 | 7 | 1 | 10½ |

=== Individual medals ===
- Board 1: (Soviet Union) Tigran Petrosian 11½ / 13 = 88.5%
- Board 2: (Argentina) Oscar Panno 14 / 18 = 77.8%
- Board 3: (Soviet Union) Mikhail Tal 12 / 13 = 92.3%
- Board 4: (Netherlands) Christian Langeweg 12 / 15 = 80.0%
- 1st reserve: (Soviet Union) Viktor Korchnoi 10½ / 13 = 80.8%
- 2nd reserve: (Hungary) László Bárczay 11 / 12 = 91.7%
