= 16th Chess Olympiad =

1964 chess tournament in Tel Aviv, Israel

An official medal from the Olympiad.

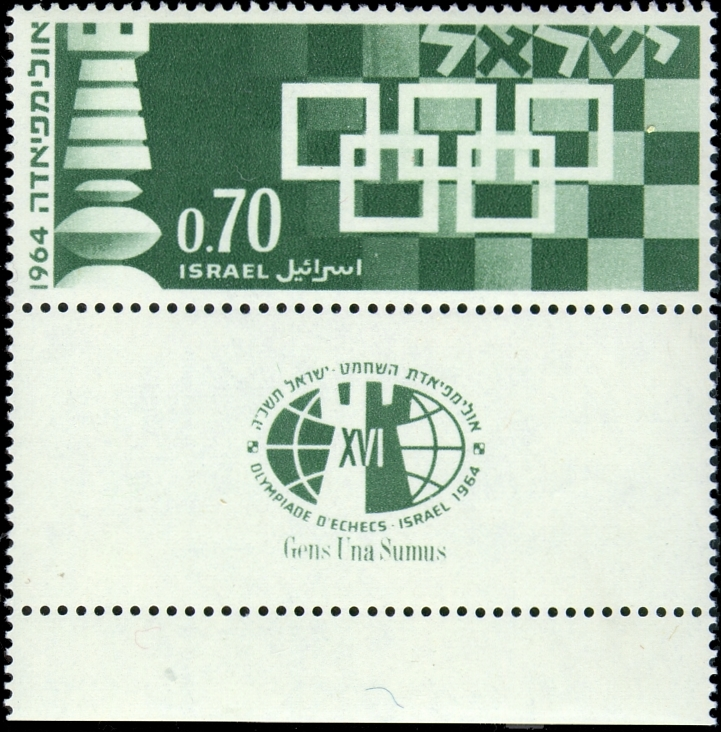
Israeli postal stamp, 1964

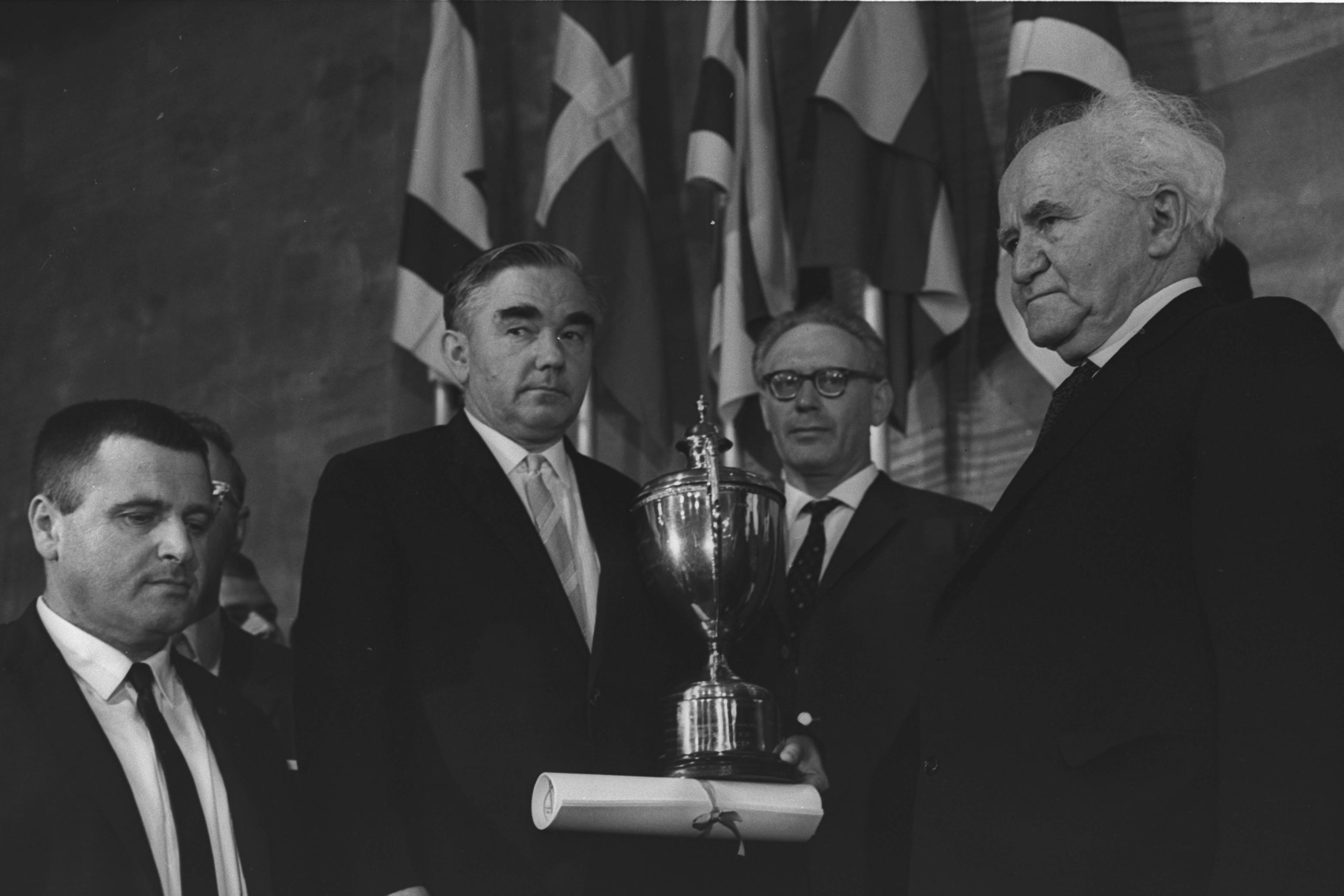
David Ben-Gurion presenting the trophy to the winning USSR team

The 16th Chess Olympiad (Hebrew: אולימפיאדת השחמט ה-16, Olimpiadat ha-shachmat ha-16), organized by FIDE and comprising a team tournament, took place between November 2 and November 25, 1964, in Tel Aviv, Israel.

The Soviet team with 6 GMs, led by world champion Petrosian, lived up to expectations and won their seventh consecutive gold medals, with Yugoslavia and West Germany taking the silver and bronze, respectively.

== Results ==
=== Preliminaries ===
A total of 50 teams entered the competition and were divided into seven preliminary groups of seven or eight teams each. With Australia making its debut, this was the first Olympiad where all six continents were represented. The top two from each group advanced to Final A, the teams placed 3rd-4th to Final B, no. 5–6 to Final C, and the rest to Final D. All preliminary groups and finals were played as round-robin tournaments. The preliminary results were as follows:

- Group 1:

No.	Country	1	2	3	4	5	6	7	+	−	=	Points
«A»	Soviet Union	-	3½	4	4	4	4	4	6	0	0	23½
«A»	Spain	½	-	1½	3½	2½	3	3	4	2	0	14
«B»	Philippines	0	2½	-	2	1½	2½	2½	3	2	1	11
«B»	Chile	0	½	2	-	2½	3	2½	3	2	1	10½
«C»	Switzerland	0	1½	2½	1½	-	2½	2½	3	3	0	10½
«C»	Venezuela	0	1	1½	1	1½	-	2½	1	5	0	7½
«D»	South Africa	0	1	1½	1½	1½	1½	-	0	6	0	7

- Group 2:

No.	Country	1	2	3	4	5	6	7	+	−	=	Points
«A»	Yugoslavia	-	2	2½	4	3	4	4	5	0	1	19½
«A»	Netherlands	2	-	3½	3½	2	4	4	4	0	2	19
«B»	Mongolia	1½	½	-	2½	3½	3	3½	4	2	0	14½
«B»	Austria	0	½	1½	-	3	4	3½	3	3	0	12½
«C»	Mexico	1	2	½	1	-	2½	3	2	3	1	10
«C»	India	0	0	1	0	1½	-	2	0	5	1	4½
«D»	Bolivia	0	0	½	½	1	2	-	0	5	1	4

- Group 3:

No.	Country	1	2	3	4	5	6	7	+	−	=	Points
«A»	Hungary	-	3	2	3	4	4	4	5	0	1	20
«A»	Israel	1	-	2½	2½	2½	4	3½	5	1	0	16
«B»	Sweden	2	1½	-	3½	1½	3	3½	3	2	1	15
«B»	Scotland	1	1½	½	-	3	2½	3	3	3	0	11½
«C»	France	0	1½	2½	1	-	3	3	3	3	0	11
«C»	Ireland	0	0	1	1½	1	-	3	1	5	0	6½
«D»	Luxembourg	0	½	½	1	1	1	-	0	6	0	4

- Group 4:

No.	Country	1	2	3	4	5	6	7	+	−	=	Points
«A»	United States	-	2½	3	3½	4	4	4	6	0	0	21
«A»	Poland	1½	-	1½	2	3	3	3½	3	2	1	14½
«B»	England	1	2½	-	1½	3½	2	2½	3	2	1	13
«B»	Norway	½	2	2½	-	1	3½	1½	2	3	1	11
«C»	Turkey	0	1	½	3	-	2	3	2	3	1	9½
«C»	Iran	0	1	2	½	2	-	2½	1	3	2	8
«D»	Portugal	0	½	1½	2½	1	1½	-	1	5	0	7

- Group 5:

No.	Country	1	2	3	4	5	6	7	+	−	=	Points
«A»	Romania	-	2½	2	2½	3½	3½	4	5	0	1	18
«A»	Czechoslovakia	1½	-	2½	3	3½	4	3½	5	1	0	18
«B»	Cuba	2	1½	-	2½	2½	½	3½	3	2	1	12½
«B»	Paraguay	1½	1	1½	-	1	2½	3½	2	4	0	11
«C»	Colombia	½	½	1½	3	-	2	3	2	3	1	10½
«C»	Puerto Rico	½	0	3½	1½	2	-	2	1	3	2	9½
«D»	Australia	0	½	½	½	1	2	-	0	5	1	4½

- Group 6:

No.	Country	1	2	3	4	5	6	7	+	−	=	Points
«A»	Argentina	-	2	3	3	3½	3	4	5	0	1	18½
«A»	Canada	2	-	2½	2½	3½	3	4	5	0	1	17½
«B»	East Germany	1	1½	-	3	4	4	3½	4	2	0	17
«B»	Ecuador	1	1½	1	-	1½	3	3½	2	4	0	11½
«C»	Monaco	½	½	0	2½	-	1½	2	1	4	1	7
«C»	Iceland	1	1	0	1	2½	-	1½	1	5	0	7
«D»	Uruguay	0	0	½	½	2	2½	-	1	4	1	5½

- Group 7:

No.	Country	1	2	3	4	5	6	7	8	+	−	=	Points
«A»	Bulgaria	-	2	3	3½	3½	3	3½	4	6	0	1	22½
«A»	West Germany	2	-	2	3½	3½	4	3½	4	5	0	2	22½
«B»	Denmark	1	2	-	2½	2	3	4	4	4	1	2	18½
«B»	Peru	½	½	1½	-	3	3½	4	4	4	3	0	17
«C»	Finland	½	½	2	1	-	2½	4	4	3	3	1	14½
«C»	Greece	1	0	1	½	1½	-	2½	3	2	5	0	9½
«D»	Dominican Republic	½	½	0	0	0	1½	-	3	1	6	0	5½
«D»	Cyprus	0	0	0	0	0	1	1	-	0	7	0	2

=== Final ===
Final A
#	Country	Players	Points	MP	Head- to-head
1	Soviet Union	Petrosian, Botvinnik, Smyslov, Keres, Stein, Spassky	36½		
2	Yugoslavia	Gligorić, Ivkov, Matanović, Parma, Udovčić, Matulović	32		
3	West Germany	Unzicker, Darga, Schmid, Pfleger, Mohrlok, Bialas	30½		
4	Hungary	Portisch, Szabó, Bilek, Lengyel, Forintos, Flesch	30		
5	Czechoslovakia	Pachman, Filip, Hort, Kaválek, Jansa, Blatný	28½		
6	United States	Reshevsky, Benko, Saidy, Bisguier, Byrne, Addison	27½		
7	Bulgaria	Padevsky, Tringov, Bobotsov, Popov, Milev, Spiridonov	27	13	3
8	Romania	Ghițescu, Gheorghiu, Ciocâltea, Radovici, Mititelu, Botez	27	13	1
9	Argentina	Eliskases, García, Schweber, Wexler, Cruz	26		
10	Poland	Doda, Bednarski, Śliwa, Filipowicz, Balcerowski, Schmidt	24		
11	Netherlands	Kuijpers, Bouwmeester, Langeweg, Zuidema, Prins	21		
12	Canada	Yanofsky, Anderson, Vranesic, Macskasy, Suttles, Witt	19		
13	Spain	Pomar, Medina García, Saborido, Menvielle Laccourreye, Mora, Pérez Gonsalves	17½	5	
14	Israel	Porath, Kraidman, Domnitz, Aloni, Guthi, Stepak	17½	3	

Final B
#	Country	Players	Points	MP
15	East Germany	Uhlmann, Malich, Liebert, Fuchs, Golz, Möhring	38½	
16	Sweden	Ståhlberg, Johansson, Sköld, Nilsson, Jansson, Fridh	32	
17	Denmark	Andersen, Kølvig, Brinck-Claussen, Blom, Jakobsen, From	31½	
18	England	Kottnauer, Clarke, Haygarth, Littlewood, Hindle, Franklin	31	
19	Peru	Quiñones, Súmar Casis, Ascencios J., Rodríguez Vargas, Pinzón Sánchez, Miranda M.	27½	15
20	Austria	Dückstein, Beni, Prameshuber, Gragger, Stöckl, Winiwarter	27½	14
21	Cuba	Jiménez, José Pérez, Rodríguez Gonzáles, Ortega, García, Cobo	26	
22	Norway	Johannessen, Zwaig, Hoen, Vinje-Gulbrandsen, Svedenborg, Kristiansen	25½	14
23	Mongolia	Myagmarsuren, Üitümen, Purevzhav, Tsagan T., Chalkhasuren, Namzhil	25½	13
24	Chile	Letelier, Hausman, Vergara, Jauregui, Godoy Bugueño, Espinoza	24	
25	Philippines	Naranja, Balinas, Borja, Campomanes, Badilles, De Castro	22½	
26	Ecuador	Yépez, Moritz, Garcés, Ottati, Yepez Obando, Cevallos	18	
27	Paraguay	Silva, Saguier, Cantero, Gonzáles, Levy, Vely	17½	
28	Scotland	Fairhurst, Aitken, Fallone, Bonner, Baxter R, Thomson	17	

Final C
#	Country	Players	Points	MP
29	Iceland	Thorsteinsson, Björnsson, Torvaldsson, Kristinsson, Sólmundarson, Kristjánsson	37½	
30	Switzerland	Kupper, Blau, Bhend, Walther, Roth, Castagna	36½	
31	Colombia	Cuéllar, Minaya Molano, Cuartas, Tejada H., Fernández, Rodríguez	35	24
32	Finland	Kanko, Westerinen, Fred, Niemelä, Rantanen, Ketonen	35	19
33	Venezuela	Tapasztó, Villarroel, Caro, Schorr, Hernández, Boucchechter	30½	
34	France	Boutteville, Mazzoni, Thiellement, Bergraser, Noradounguian, Zinser	29½	
35	Greece	Paidousis, Kokkoris, Vizantiadis, Hadziotis, Papapostolou, Ornithopoulos	27½	
36	Iran	Mashian, Kahyai, Jelveh, Safvat, Farboud, Zafaranian	23½	
37	India	Ali, Aaron, Sakhalkar, Madon, Shukla, Shekhar G.	22	
38	Puerto Rico	Colón Romero M., Reissmann, Martínez Buitrago, Sitiriche, Sacarello, Cintrón	21½	
39	Turkey	Süer, Külür, Haralambof, Tebi, Nutku, Bilyap	20½	
40	Mexico	Aldrete, Camarena, Reza Delón, Delgado, Guerrero, Flores	20	
41	Ireland	Keogh, Reilly, Murphy P., O'Hare, Cassidy, De Loughrey	13	
42	Monaco	Casa, Weiss, Rometti, Deslauriers J., Kostjoerin	12	

Final D
#	Country	Players	Points
43	Australia	Koshnitsky, Hanks, Geus, Fuller, Hay, Viner	22½
44	South Africa	Dreyer, Kirby, Rubinsztein, Friedgood, Wolpert, Isaacson	18
45	Bolivia	Ramírez, Salazar, Zegada, Carvajal	15½
46	Uruguay	Olivera, del Monte, Cabral, Infantozzi, Kalkstein, Weizman	14½
47	Portugal	Ribeiro, Durão, Rocha, Santos, Vinagre, Cordovil	14
48	Luxembourg	Conrady, Philippe, Schneider, Wantz, Schneider, Thill	12
49	Dominican Republic	Peña, Yabra, Guerrero, Sánchez, Castrillón	10½
50	Cyprus	Kleopas, Papadopoulos, Hadjikypris, Ioannidis, Lantsias, Zappas	5

=== Final «A» ===
No.	Country	1	2	3	4	5	6	7	8	9	10	11	12	13	14	+	−	=	Points
1	Soviet Union	-	2	1	2½	2½	4	3	2½	3½	2	4	3	3½	3	10	1	2	36½
2	Yugoslavia	2	-	2	1½	2	2	2	3	2	3½	2½	3	3	3½	6	1	6	32
3	West Germany	3	2	-	1½	2	2	2½	2½	2	2½	3	3½	1	3	7	2	4	30½
4	Hungary	1½	2½	2½	-	2½	2	1	3	2	2½	3	2½	3	2	8	2	3	30
5	Czechoslovakia	1½	2	2	1½	-	1½	2	2	1½	2	3½	3	2½	3½	4	4	5	28½
6	United States	0	2	2	2	2½	-	2	2½	2½	2½	1½	2½	3	2½	7	2	4	27½
7	Bulgaria	1	2	1½	3	2	2	-	3	2	1½	1½	2½	2	3	4	4	5	27
8	Romania	1½	1	1½	1	2	1½	1	-	3	2½	2½	3	3½	3	6	6	1	27
9	Argentina	½	2	2	2	2½	1½	2	1	-	2	3	3	2	2½	4	3	6	26
10	Poland	2	½	1½	1½	2	1½	2½	1½	2	-	3	1	2½	2½	4	6	3	24
11	Netherlands	0	1½	1	1	½	2½	2½	1½	1	1	-	2½	3	3	5	8	0	21
12	Canada	1	1	½	1½	1	1½	1½	1	1	3	1½	-	2	2½	2	10	1	19
13	Spain	½	1	3	1	1½	1	2	½	2	1½	1	2	-	½	1	9	3	17½
14	Israel	1	½	1	2	½	1½	1	1	1½	1½	1	1½	3½	-	1	11	1	17½

=== Final «B» ===
No.	Country	15	16	17	18	19	20	21	22	23	24	25	26	27	28	+	−	=	Points
15	East Germany	-	2	3	3½	2½	2½	3½	4	1	2½	3	4	3½	3½	11	1	1	38½
16	Sweden	2	-	1	2½	1½	2	1½	2	3½	3½	3	3	4	2½	7	3	3	32
17	Denmark	1	3	-	2½	2	4	2	2	2	2½	3½	2	2½	2½	7	1	5	31½
18	England	½	1½	1½	-	2½	2	3	2	2	2½	3	3½	3½	3½	7	3	3	31
19	Peru	1½	2½	2	1½	-	1½	2½	½	3	2	3	2½	2	3	6	4	3	27½
20	Austria	1½	2	0	2	2½	-	3	2½	3	2	2	4	1½	1½	5	4	4	27½
21	Cuba	½	2½	2	1	1½	1	-	2	1½	2	1½	2½	4	4	4	6	3	26
22	Norway	0	2	2	2	3½	1½	2	-	3	2½	2	2	½	2½	4	3	6	25½
23	Mongolia	3	½	2	2	1	1	2½	1	-	3½	3	1½	2	2½	5	5	3	25½
24	Chile	1½	½	1½	1½	2	2	2	1½	½	-	1½	3½	3	3	3	7	3	24
25	Philippines	1	1	½	1	1	2	2½	2	1	2½	-	2½	3½	2	4	6	3	22½
26	Ecuador	0	1	2	½	1½	0	1½	2	2½	½	1½	-	2½	2½	3	8	2	18
27	Paraguay	½	0	1½	½	2	2½	0	3½	2	1	½	1½	-	2	2	8	3	17½
28	Scotland	½	1½	1½	½	1	2½	0	1½	1½	1	2	1½	2	-	1	10	2	17

=== Final «C» ===
No.	Country	29	30	31	32	33	34	35	36	37	38	39	40	41	42	+	−	=	Points
29	Iceland	-	3	3	2	2½	2½	3	3½	2	2½	3½	2	4	4	10	0	3	37½
30	Switzerland	1	-	1½	2½	3	2	4	2½	3	4	3	3	3½	3½	10	2	1	36½
31	Colombia	1	2½	-	2½	3	2½	2½	2½	3	2½	3	3½	4	2½	12	1	0	35
32	Finland	2	1½	1½	-	2½	3	2½	3½	1½	4	3	3½	4	2½	9	3	1	35
33	Venezuela	1½	1	1	1½	-	1	2½	3½	4	3	3½	1½	3½	3	7	6	0	30½
34	France	1½	2	1½	1	3	-	2	2	2	3	1½	3	3½	3½	5	4	4	29½
35	Greece	1	0	1½	1½	1½	2	-	4	2	2½	4	2	2½	3	5	5	3	27½
36	Iran	½	1½	1½	½	½	2	0	-	3	1½	3	2	3½	4	4	7	2	23½
37	India	2	1	1	2½	0	2	2	1	-	2	1½	2½	1½	3	3	6	4	22
38	Puerto Rico	1½	0	1½	0	1	1	1½	2½	2	-	1½	2½	3	3½	4	8	1	21½
39	Turkey	½	1	1	1	½	2½	0	1	2½	2½	-	3	3	2	5	7	1	20½
40	Mexico	2	1	½	½	2½	1	2	2	1½	1½	1	-	2	2½	2	7	4	20
41	Ireland	0	½	0	0	½	½	1½	½	2½	1	1	2	-	3	2	10	1	13
42	Monaco	0	½	1½	1½	1	½	1	0	1	½	2	1½	1	-	0	12	1	12

=== Final «D» ===
No.	Country	43	44	45	46	47	48	49	50	+	−	=	Points
43	Australia	-	2	4	3	3½	3½	2½	4	6	0	1	22½
44	South Africa	2	-	1½	3	2½	2½	2½	4	5	1	1	18
45	Bolivia	0	2½	-	1½	2½	1½	3½	4	4	3	0	15½
46	Uruguay	1	1	2½	-	2	2	3	3	3	2	2	14½
47	Portugal	½	1½	1½	2	-	3	2½	3	3	3	1	14
48	Luxembourg	½	1½	2½	2	1	-	2½	2	2	3	2	12
49	Dominican Republic	1½	1½	½	1	1½	1½	-	3	1	6	0	10½
50	Cyprus	0	0	0	1	1	2	1	-	0	6	1	5

=== Individual medals ===
- Board 1: (East Germany) Wolfgang Uhlmann 15 / 18 = 83.3%
- Board 2: (Mongolia) Tudev Ujtumen 13½ / 17 = 79.4%
- Board 3: (Soviet Union) Vassily Smyslov 11 / 13 = 84.6%
- Board 4: (Soviet Union) Paul Keres (10/12), (West Germany) Helmut Pfleger (12½/15), and (South Africa) David Friedgood (10/12) = 83.3%
- 1st reserve: (Soviet Union) Leonid Stein 10 / 13 = 76.9%
- 2nd reserve: (Socialist Federal Republic of Yugoslavia) Milan Matulović and (East Germany) Günther Möhring 11 / 13 = 84.6%

At the other end of the spectrum, Milton Ioannidis of Cyprus lost all of his 4 games, giving him a total score at the Olympiads of 0 / 24 = 0.0%.
