= Stanciu =

Stanciu is a surname. Notable people with the surname include:

- Anișoara Cușmir-Stanciu (born 1962), Romanian long jumper
- Constantin Stanciu (1907–1986), Romanian football player
- Daniela Stanciu (born 1987), Romanian high jumper
- Ion-Aurel Stanciu (born 1955), Romanian general
- Nicolae Stanciu (born 1993), Romanian football player
- Nicolae Stanciu (born 1973), Romanian football player
- Patricia Stanciu (born 2011), Romanian rhythmic gymnast
- Simion Stanciu (1949–2010), Romanian flute player and composer
- Traian Stanciu (1935–2019), Romanian chess master
