= Obando =

Obando may refer to:

== People ==
- Ángel Obando, retired Honduran footballer
- César Obando (1969-), retired Honduran footballer
- Jhon Obando (born 2001), Colombian para-athlete
- José María Obando (1795-1861), Neogranadine General and politician who twice served as President of Colombia
- Marvin Obando (1960-), retired Costa Rican footballer
- Miguel Aguilar Obando (1953-), Salvadoran football coach
- Miguel Obando y Bravo (1926-), Nicaraguan prelate of the Roman Catholic Church
- Sherman Obando (1970-), former Major League Baseball player
- Trotzky Augusto Yepez Obando, (1940-2010), Ecuadorian chess player

== Other uses ==
- Obando, Bulacan, a second class partially urban municipality in the province of Bulacan, Philippines
  - Obando Church, one of the oldest and most historic churches in the Philippines in the municipality above
  - Obando Fertility Rites, a Filipino dance ritual held at the church above
- Obando, Valle del Cauca, a municipality located in the Department of Valle del Cauca, Colombia
- Obando Airport, an airport in Puerto Inírida, Colombia
- Puebla de Obando, a municipality located in the province of Badajoz, Extremadura, Spain
