= Martin Emanuel Johansson =

Swedish chess player (1918–1999)

Personal information
- Born: 6 August 1918 Norrhyttan, Sweden
- Died: July 1999 (aged 80) Norrhyttan, Sweden

Chess career
- Country: Sweden

Martin Emanuel Johansson (6 August 1918 - July 1999) was a Swedish chess player, Swedish Chess Championship winner (1966).

== Biography ==
Martin Emanuel Johansson was one of the strongest chess players in Sweden in the 1960s. He won three medals in Swedish Chess Championship: gold (1966), silver (1965, he shared 1st-2nd place with Zandor Nilsson but lost additional match 2:3) and bronze (1964). In 1963, in Halle Martin Emanuel Johansson ranked 9th place in World Chess Championship Zonal tournament. The main achievement in the international arena for Martin Emanuel Johansson was the shared 1st-2nd place with the grandmaster Alexander Kotov at the New Year tournament in Stockholm (1959/60). Then Johansson managed, among others, to get ahead of the grandmaster Paul Keres.

Martin Emanuel Johansson was also played of correspondence chess. In 1950 and 1962, he twice won Swedish Correspondence Chess Championship.

Martin Emanuel Johansson played for Sweden in the Chess Olympiads:

- In 1960, at third board in the 14th Chess Olympiad in Leipzig (+7, =5, -3),
- In 1962, at first board in the 15th Chess Olympiad in Varna (+3, =5, -4),
- In 1964, at second board in the 16th Chess Olympiad in Tel Aviv (+7, =5, -1),
- In 1966, at first board in the 17th Chess Olympiad in Havana (+4, =7, -5),
- In 1968, at third board in the 18th Chess Olympiad in Lugano (+3, =6, -4).

Martin Emanuel Johansson played for Sweden in the European Team Chess Championship preliminaries:

- In 1961, at fifth board in the 2nd European Team Chess Championship preliminaries (+3, =0, -1),
- In 1970, at first board in the 4th European Team Chess Championship preliminaries (+0, =5, -1).
