= Zvonko Vranesic =

Croatian-Canadian chess player (born 1938)

Personal information
- Born: 4 October 1938 (age 87) Zagreb, Croatia

Chess career
- Country: Canada
- Title: International Master (1969)
- Peak rating: 2450 (July 1971)

Zvonko Vranesic (born 4 October 1938) is a Croatian–Canadian International Master of chess, and an International Master of Correspondence Chess. He is an electrical engineer, a university professor, and a developer of computer chess software.

== Early life, immigration, education ==
Zvonko Vranešić was born in Zagreb. He won the Junior Championship of Yugoslavia in 1957. He immigrated to Canada in October 1958, settling in Toronto, Ontario. He graduated in Electrical Engineering from the University of Toronto, earning bachelor and doctoral degrees. He began competing with success in Canadian chess tournaments, soon after his arrival. Vranesic won the Toronto City Championship in 1959 (with a perfect score), and repeated in 1967, 1970, and 1972. He won the Ontario Open Championship in 1959 and 1963.

== Near-misses in Canadian championships ==
Vranesic placed 2nd, with 8/11, in the 1961 Canadian Chess Championship, at Brockville, Ontario 1961 (Lionel Joyner won); he repeated this placing in the 1963 Canadian Chess Championship, Winnipeg, Manitoba 1963, with 11.5/15 (Daniel Yanofsky won). Vranesic placed 2nd, to GM Pal Benko, at the 1964 Canadian Open Chess Championship.

He represented Canada in the Interzonal at Amsterdam 1964 (Yanofsky had qualified, but declined his place in favour of Vranesic), but placed 24th (last). However, his game was improving with opportunities to compete at high levels. He tied for first place at the Canadian Chess Championship, Pointe-Claire 1969. He earned the International Master title for this result. But he lost the Vancouver playoff match (and the right to advance to the 1970 Interzonal) to Duncan Suttles, by 1.5-0.5.

== Olympiads ==
He represented Canada at five Chess Olympiads. Here are his detailed results:

- In 1964, he played at third board at 16th Chess Olympiad in Tel Aviv (+4 –6 =5).
- In 1966, he played at second board at 17th Chess Olympiad in Havana (+6 –2 =9).
- In 1970, he played at third board at 19th Chess Olympiad in Siegen (+7 –4 =5).
- In 1972, he played at third board at 20th Chess Olympiad in Skopje (+4 –0 =10).
- In 1980, he played at first reserve board at 24th Chess Olympiad in La Valletta (+4 –1 =3).

His totals in Olympiad play for Canada are (+25 -13 =32), for 58.6 per cent.

One noteworthy Olympiad win came in 1964 at Tel Aviv, when he defeated the Soviet champion GM Leonid Stein. In 1970, he scored a Grandmaster norm (a performance rating of over 2600) at Siegen; this would be his best career performance. He also served as the captain of the 1980 Canadian team, which attained Canada's second-best result to date, ninth place on tiebreak. Vranesic played chess at a high level, but was never a professional player. He earned the title of International Master of Correspondence Chess (IMC) in 1973. He has been virtually retired from serious chess competition since the mid-1990s.

== Professor, computer chess ==
Dr. Zvonko Vranesic is Professor Emeritus, Electrical and Computer Engineering, University of Toronto. He was co-developer of a computer chess program, Chute, which competed in Computer Chess Championships. Details of his career at the University of Toronto are given at his academic web page.

== Notable chess games ==
- Zvonko Vranesic vs Leonid Stein, Tel Aviv Olympiad 1964, Modern Benoni Defence (A78), 1-0 Vranesic catches the Soviet champion Stein in an incorrect tactic, gains an advantage, then pursues it relentlessly.
- Zvonko Vranesic vs Lawrence Day, Canadian Zonal Championship, Toronto 1972, Modern Benoni Defence (A79), 1-0 A hard grind between Toronto's top two players eventually goes to the veteran.
- David Levy vs Zvonko Vranesic, Lone Pine 1975, Sicilian Defence, Velimirovic Attack (B89), 0-1 The Scot Levy, a well-known chess author and master, tries the ultra-sharp Velimirovic Attack, but finds his plans dashed.
- Zvonko Vranesic vs Kevin Spraggett, Canadian Zonal Championship, Montreal 1981, King's Indian Defence, Saemisch Variation (E84), 1-0 The rising star Spraggett learns that Vranesic is a guru of King's Indian formations.
- Vladimir Tukmakov vs Zvonko Vranesic, Mississauga Croatia Club International 1990, Modern Benoni Defence (A73), 0-1
