= Edgar Walther =

Swiss chess player

Personal information
- Born: 24 December 1930
- Died: 23 October 2013 (aged 82)

Chess career
- Country: Switzerland
- Title: FIDE Master, ICCF International Master (1978)

Edgar Walther (24 December 1930 – 23 October 2013) was a Swiss chess player who held the titles of FIDE Master and International Correspondence Chess Master (1978). He was a Chess Olympiad individual medalist (1954).

== Biography ==
Walther three times won the Swiss Confederation Chess Championships (1949, 1957, 1971). In 1965, he was the best in the Swiss Cup. In 1965, he won first place in the Swiss Chess Championship, but lost additional match. Between 1953 and 2007, he participated in the Swiss team championships with one club - Zürich Chess Club, which is considered to be an unparalleled record in Swiss chess history. In 1968, he won the Swiss Chess Team Championship with his club.

He became more widely known for his participation in the Zürich International Chess Tournament of 1959. Although Walther shared only 13th place (behind winner Mikhail Tal), he played a drawn game with future World Chess Champion Bobby Fischer, in which Fischer only just managed to save a lost game, partly by exploiting of the possibilities of an endgame with opposite colored bishops two pawns down. In 1969, Fischer included this game in his book My 60 Memorable Games, admitting he was tempted to resign at move 37.

Walther played for Switzerland in the Chess Olympiads:

- In 1954, at second reserve board in the 11th Chess Olympiad in Amsterdam (+8, =3, -2) and won individual silver medal,
- In 1956, at third board in the 12th Chess Olympiad in Moscow (+8, =5, -4),
- In 1958, at fourth board in the 13th Chess Olympiad in Munich (+6, =5, -3),
- In 1964, at fourth board in the 16th Chess Olympiad in Tel Aviv (+9, =1, -4),
- In 1966, at second board in the 17th Chess Olympiad in Havana (+8, =3, -5),
- In 1968, at reserve board in the 18th Chess Olympiad in Lugano (+4, =1, -5).

He also played for Switzerland in the Clare Benedict Chess Cups (1958-1961, 1963-1966, 1968, 1971-1972). In team competition he won gold (1958) and bronze (1960) medals but in individual competition he won two gold (1961, 1963) medals.

In later years, Walther actively participated in correspondence chess tournaments. He won the Goldenen Springer tournament (196/7-1971) and the Swiss Correspondence Chess Championship. He successfully participated in the 8th World Correspondence Chess Championship semi-final, where he shared 1st-2nd place, but in the championship final (1975–80) he shared 11th-12th place. In 1978, Edgar Walther was awarded the International Correspondence Chess Master (ICM) title.
