= Hans Bouwmeester =

Dutch chess player (born 1929)

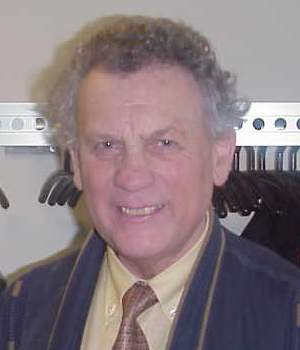
- Bouwmeester in 2004

Personal information
- Born: 16 September 1929 (age 96) Haarlem, Netherlands

Chess career
- Country: Netherlands
- Title: International Master (1954), International Correspondence Chess Grandmaster (1981)
- FIDE rating: 2343 (January 2010)
- Peak rating: 2430 (July 1971)

Hans Bouwmeester (born 16 September 1929) is a Dutch chess player who holds the chess titles of International Master (1954) and International Correspondence Chess Grandmaster (1981). He was a Dutch Chess Championship medalist (1967) and is an author of chess books.

== Biography ==
In the 1950s and 1960s Hans Bouwmeester was one of the top leaders of the Dutch chess players. He participated several times in the Dutch Chess Championship finals, where achieved the greatest success in 1967, when he shared 1st place with Hans Ree but lost additional match. In 1954 Hans Bouwmeester played FIDE Zonal Tournament in Munich and ranked in 15th place.

Hans Bouwmeester played for Netherlands in the Chess Olympiads:

- In 1956, at third board in the 12th Chess Olympiad in Moscow (+5, =12, -0),
- In 1960, at third board in the 14th Chess Olympiad in Leipzig (+3, =6, -2),
- In 1962, at third board in the 15th Chess Olympiad in Varna (+4, =8, -3),
- In 1964, at second board in the 16th Chess Olympiad in Tel Aviv (+3, =6, -4),
- In 1966, at first board in the 17th Chess Olympiad in Havana (+7, =10, -0),
- In 1968, at fourth board in the 18th Chess Olympiad in Lugano (+6, =8, -0),
- In 1970, at reserve board in the 19th Chess Olympiad in Siegen (+5, =2, -0).

Also Hans Bouwmeester twelve times played for Netherlands in the Clare Benedict Chess Cups (1955, 1957-1959, 1961-1964, 1968-1970, 1973) where in team competition won 2 gold (1955, 1969) and 4 silver (1957, 1963, 1964, 1968) medals, and in individual competition won 3 gold (1955, 1957, 1973) medals.

Hans Bouwmeester achieved several successes in international chess tournaments, the largest of which was shared 1st place (together with Vasja Pirc) in the traditional chess Hoogovens tournament in Beverwijk in 1954. In 1951, he shared 1st place in Detmold, while in the tournaments played in Beverwijk Hans Bouwmeester shared 2nd (in 1955, together with Jan Hein Donner behind Borislav Milić) and 3rd place (in 1958, together with Aleksandar Matanović and Gideon Ståhlberg behind Max Euwe and Jan Hein Donner). Since 1980, he very rare participated in chess tournaments classified by the FIDE. In 1996 Hans Bouwmeester took part in the World Senior Chess Championship (players over 60) and ranked in 25th place.

Hans Bouwmeester was known as a participant in Correspondence chess tournaments. In 1981, he was awarded the International Correspondence Chess Federation (ICCF) International Correspondence Chess Grandmaster title.

He is the author of several chess books published in Dutch language:

- Het eindspel (1975),
- Opgaven voor middenspel en eindspel (1976),
- Schaken als vak: brug naar het professionele schaak (1976),
- De opening (1977),
- De schaakstukken nader bezien (1981),
- Grote schaakmeesters (1981).
