= Yair Kraidman =

Israeli chess grandmaster (born 1932)

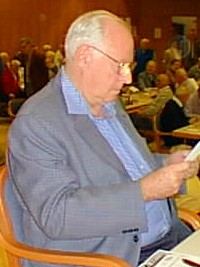
- Kraidman in 1998

Personal information
- Native name: יאיר קרידמן
- Born: November 1, 1932 (age 94) Haifa, Mandatory Palestine

Chess career
- Country: Israel
- Title: Grandmaster (1977)
- Peak rating: 2475 (January 1977)

Yair Kraidman (Hebrew: יאיר קרידמן; born 1 November 1932, in Haifa) is an Israeli chess grandmaster.

== Career ==
He played for Israel in ten Chess Olympiads.

- In 1958, he played at second reserve board at the 13th Chess Olympiad in Munich (+1 –3 =5).
- In 1960, he played at first reserve board at the 14th Chess Olympiad in Leipzig (+4 –2 =5).
- In 1962, he played at fourth board at the 15th Chess Olympiad in Varna (+5 –4 =1).
- In 1964, he played at second board at the 16th Chess Olympiad in Tel Aviv (+7 –3 =6).
- In 1966, he played at second board at the 17th Chess Olympiad in Havana (+6 –3 =6).
- In 1968, he played at third board at the 18th Chess Olympiad in Lugano (+9 –1 =4).
- In 1970, he played at second board at the 19th Chess Olympiad in Siegen (+6 –0 =10).
- In 1972, he played at second board at the 20th Chess Olympiad in Skopje (+7 –2 =9).
- In 1974, he played at second board at the 21st Chess Olympiad in Nice (+5 –5 =4).
- In 1976, he played at second board at the 22nd Chess Olympiad in Haifa (+2 –2 =5).

He won individual silver medal on third board at Lugano 1968.

In 1959, he took 2nd in the Israeli championship.

In tournaments he was 4th at Netanya 1961, 2nd at Tel Aviv 1966 (Svetozar Gligorić won), tied for 7-10th at Netanya 1968 (Bobby Fischer won), 8th at Netanya 1969 (Samuel Reshevsky won), 6th at Netanya 1971, 13th at Manila 1974, 2nd at Netanya 1975, 1st at Beer-Sheva 1976, 13th= at Hastings 1976/77 (Oleg Romanishin won), 3rd at Raman Ha-Sharon 1979.

In 2001, he was 7th in Saint Vincent (European Seniors). The event was won by Jacob Murey.

In 2004, he played for Israel at third board, and won team gold medal at 1st World Senior Team Championship, Port Erin (Isle of Man).

He was awarded the International Master (IM) title in 1965 and the Grandmaster (GM) title in 1976, becoming the first sabra to earn the GM title.

== See also ==
- List of Jewish chess players
