= Felix Winiwarter =

Austrian chess player (1930–2018)

Personal information
- Born: 21 March 1930
- Died: 9 September 2018 (aged 88)

Chess career
- Country: Austria

Felix Winiwarter (21 March 1930 – 9 September 2018) was an Austrian chess player, an Austrian Chess Championship medalist (1956).

== Biography ==
From the late 1950s to the early 1970s, Winiwarter was one of the leading Austrian chess players. In 1965, in Reichenau an der Rax, he won silver medal in the Austrian Chess Championship.

Winiwarter played for Austria in the Chess Olympiads:

- In 1964, at second reserve board in the 16th Chess Olympiad in Tel Aviv (+5, =2, -3),
- In 1966, at fourth board in the 17th Chess Olympiad in Havana (+7, =5, -5).

Winiwarter played for Austria in the European Team Chess Championship preliminaries:

- In 1957, at eighth board in the 1st European Team Chess Championship preliminaries (+1, =4, -1),
- In 1961, at seventh board in the 2nd European Team Chess Championship preliminaries (+2, =3, -4),
- In 1965, at fourth board in the 3rd European Team Chess Championship preliminaries (+1, =4, -1),
- In 1970, at seventh board in the 4th European Team Chess Championship preliminaries (+1, =0, -3),

Winiwarter played for Austria in the Clare Benedict Chess Cups:

- In 1958, at third board in the 5th Clare Benedict Chess Cup in Neuchâtel (+1, =1, -3),
- In 1967, at third board in the 14th Clare Benedict Chess Cup in Leysin (+0, =1, -3).

For a considerable time from the early 1990s, Winiwarter participated in the European and World level senior chess tournaments.
