= Erling Kristiansen (chess player) =

Norwegian chess player (1936–2022)

Personal information
- Born: 17 December 1936
- Died: 27 September 2022 (aged 85)

Chess career
- Country: Norway
- Title: FIDE Master (1985)
- Peak rating: 2405 (July 1973)

Erling Kristiansen (17 December 1936 – 27 September 2022) was a Norwegian chess FIDE Master (FM), Norwegian Chess Championship winner (1972).

== Biography ==
From the early 1960s to the early 1980s, Erling Kristiansen was one of Norway's leading chess players. In 1972, in Røros he won Norwegian Chess Championship.

Erling Kristiansen played for Norway in the Chess Olympiads:

- In 1964, at second reserve board in the 16th Chess Olympiad in Tel Aviv (+1, =3, -2),
- In 1966, at fourth board in the 17th Chess Olympiad in Havana (+1, =5, -4),
- In 1972, at first board in the 20th Chess Olympiad in Skopje (+6, =5, -3).

Erling Kristiansen played for Norway in the European Team Chess Championship preliminaries:

- In 1983, at seventh board in the 8th European Team Chess Championship preliminaries (+1, =0, -1).

In the 2000s and 2010s, Erling Kristiansen often participated in European and World Senior Chess Championships.
