= László Bárczay =

Hungarian chess grandmaster (1936–2016)

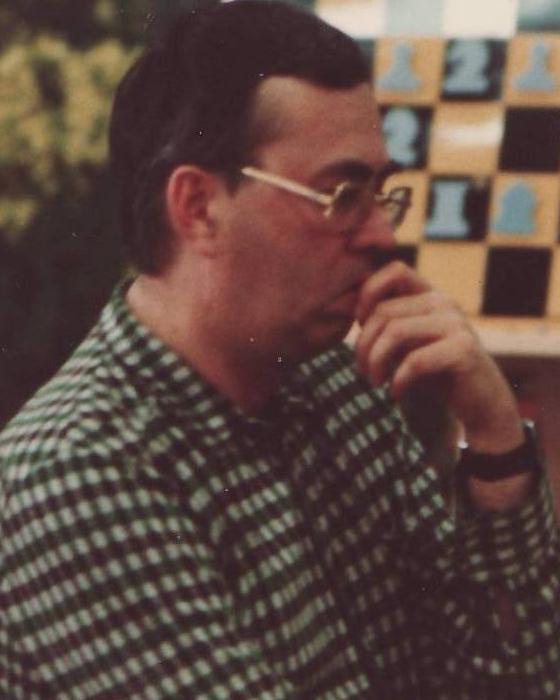
- László Bárczay, Dortmund 1982

Personal information
- Born: 21 February 1936 Miskolc, Hungary
- Died: 7 April 2016 (aged 80)

Chess career
- Country: Hungary
- Title: FIDE Grandmaster (1967); ICCF Grandmaster (1979)
- Peak rating: 2485 (January 1976)

László Bárczay (21 February 1936 – 7 April 2016) was a Hungarian chess Grandmaster.

== Biography ==
In 1966 he was awarded the FIDE International Master title. At the 1966 Olympiad in Havana, he scored 11/12 (ten wins and two draws) as second reserve for the bronze medal-winning Hungarian team, winning the individual gold medal for sixth board. In 1967 he was awarded the Grandmaster title.

Other tournament successes include:

- Asztalos Memorial in Salgótarján, 1967 – 1st=
- Zonal Tournament in Vrnjačka Banja, 1967 – 3rd
- Sarajevo, 1968 – 1st=
- Polanica-Zdrój, 1969 – 1st
- Bari, 1970 – 2nd
- Lublin, 1975 – 2nd
- Astor, 1982 – 1st

From 1972 to 1976 he was the editor of the Magyar Sakkélet. During this time he took up correspondence chess, and was awarded the ICCF International Master title in 1973. Bárczay earned the ICCF Grandmaster title in 1979 after finishing equal first in the Vidmar memorial tournament between 1975 and 1979.
