= Luben Popov =

Bulgarian chess player (born 1936)

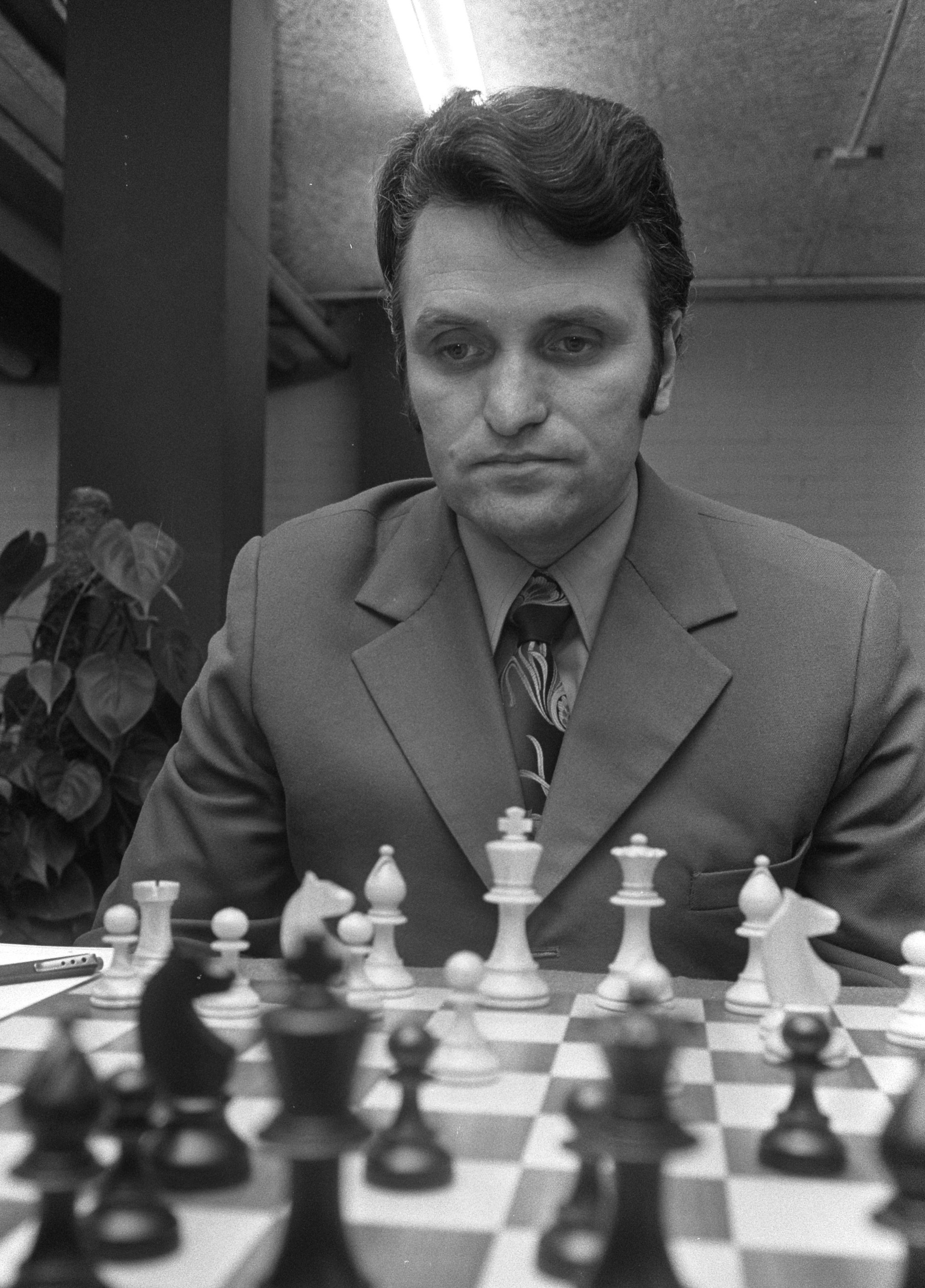

Personal information
- Born: 28 January 1936 (age 90) Pazardzhik, Bulgaria

Chess career
- Country: Bulgaria
- Title: International Master (1965)
- Peak rating: 2470 (July 1973)

Luben Popov (Bulgarian: Любен Попов; born 28 January 1936) is a Bulgarian chess International Master (IM) (1965), Bulgarian Chess Championship winner (1970), European Team Chess Championships individual medalist (1977, 1980), World Student Team Chess Championships winner (1959).

== Biography ==
In the 1960s and 1970s Luben Popov was one of the leading Bulgarian chess players. In 1970, he won Bulgarian Chess Championship.Luben Popov won bronze medals four times in the Bulgarian Chess Championships (1959, 1962, 1963, 1971). Three times he participated in FIDE Zonal tournaments: Budapest (1960), Enschede (1963), Warsaw (1979). Luben Popov was winner of many international chess tournament awards, including first place in Plovdiv (1973), Reggio Emilia (1973/74), Albena (1977), Rome (1981). In 1965, he was awarded the FIDE International Master (IM) title.

Luben Popov played for Bulgaria in the Chess Olympiads:

- In 1962, at second reserve board in the 15th Chess Olympiad in Varna (+1, =6, -1),
- In 1964, at fourth board in the 16th Chess Olympiad in Tel Aviv (+1, =5, -1),
- In 1966, at second reserve board in the 17th Chess Olympiad in Havana (+5, =3, -0),
- In 1970, at fourth board in the 19th Chess Olympiad in Siegen (+3, =6, -2),
- In 1974, at fourth board in the 21st Chess Olympiad in Nice (+7, =1, -3),
- In 1980, at first reserve board in the 24th Chess Olympiad in La Valletta (+2, =3, -1),
- In 1982, at second reserve board in the 25th Chess Olympiad in Lucerne (+1, =2, -2).

Luben Popov played for Bulgaria in the European Team Chess Championships:

- In 1970, at forth board in the 4th European Team Chess Championship in Kapfenberg (+2, =3, -2),
- In 1977, at eighth board in the 6th European Team Chess Championship in Moscow (+2, =3, -2) and won individual bronze medal,
- In 1980, at eighth board in the 7th European Team Chess Championship in Skara (+4, =2, -1) and won individual gold medal.

Luben Popov played for Bulgaria in the World Student Team Chess Championships:

- In 1958, at second reserve board in the 5th World Student Team Chess Championship in Varna (+1, =0, -2) and won team silver medal,
- In 1959, at third board in the 6th World Student Team Chess Championship in Budapest (+8, =4, -1) and won team gold medal,
- In 1960, at third board in the 7th World Student Team Chess Championship in Leningrad (+5, =5, -2).
