= Ilkka Antero Kanko =

Finnish chess player (1934–2026)

Personal information
- Born: 22 November 1934 Salo, Finland
- Died: 29 January 2026 (aged 91) Vantaa, Finland

Chess career
- Country: Finland
- Title: FIDE Master (1986); International Correspondence Chess Master (1984)
- Peak rating: 2345 (January 1995)

Ilkka Antero Kanko (22 November 1934 – 29 January 2026) was a Finnish chess player who holds the chess titles of FIDE Master (FM) and International Correspondence Chess Master (IM). He won the Finnish Chess Championship in 1964.

== Biography ==
From the early 1960s to the mid-1970s, Kanko was one of Finland's leading chess players. In Finnish Chess Championships he has won gold (1964), two silver (1965, 1968) and three bronze (1963, 1970, 1971) medals. Ilkka Antero Kanko participated in World Chess Championship Zonal tournament (1963).

He played for Finland in the Chess Olympiads:

- In 1964, at first board in the 16th Chess Olympiad in Tel Aviv (+8, =3, -7),
- In 1966, at third board in the 17th Chess Olympiad in Havana (+4, =6, -6),
- In 1972, at second reserve board in the 20th Chess Olympiad in Skopje (+3, =5, -2),
- In 1976, at fourth board in the 22nd Chess Olympiad in Haifa (+2, =3, -4).

Kanko played for Finland in the European Team Chess Championship preliminaries:

- In 1961, at ninth board in the 2nd European Team Chess Championship preliminaries (+1, =1, -2),
- In 1973, at second board in the 5th European Team Chess Championship preliminaries (+1, =3, -2).

He played for Finland in the World Student Team Chess Championships:

- In 1956, at third board in the 3rd World Student Team Chess Championship in Uppsala (+3, =3, -2),
- In 1959, at first board in the 6th World Student Team Chess Championship in Budapest (+3, =5, -4),
- In 1961, at first board in the 8th World Student Team Chess Championship in Helsinki (+4, =4, -3).

In later years, Kanko actively participated in correspondence chess tournaments. He participated with Finland team in 10th Correspondence Chess Olympiad (1987–1995). In 1984, Ilkka Antero Kanko was awarded the ICCF International Correspondence Chess Master (IM) title.

Kanko died on 29 January 2026, at the age of 91.
