= Norman Littlewood =

English chess player

Personal information
- Born: 31 January 1933 Sheffield, England
- Died: 1989 (aged 55–56)

Chess career
- Country: England

Norman Littlewood (31 January 1933 – May 1989) was an English chess player, British Chess Championship medalist (1963, 1965, 1966).

== Biography ==
Norman Littlewood was a representative of a well-known chess family. He was the younger brother of the master John Littlewood. Like his older brother, Norman Littlewood played in a sharply attacking style, for which he received the nickname "Little Tal" from British journalists in his youth. Norman Littlewood was British Chess Championship repeated participant where which won three silver medals: in 1963, 1965, and 1966. Also he was often participated in Hastings International Chess Congress.

Norman Littlewood played for England in the Chess Olympiads:

- In 1964, at fourth board in the 16th Chess Olympiad in Tel Aviv (+6, =2, -6),
- In 1966, at fourth board in the 17th Chess Olympiad in Havana (+5, =4, -5).
