= Nikolaos Ornithopoulos =

Greek chess player

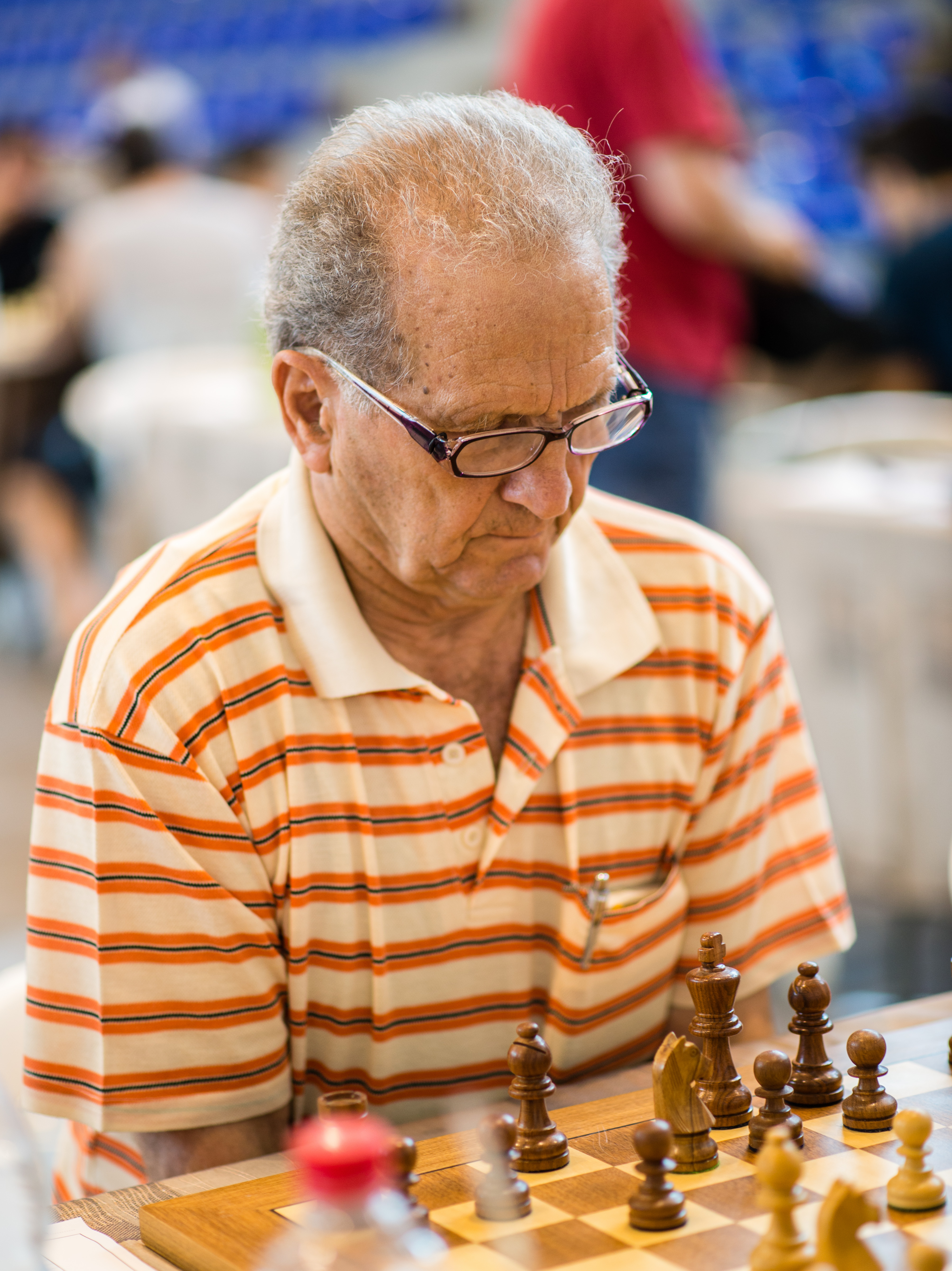
- Nikolaos Ornithopoulos in Ikaros International Chess Tournament 2016

Personal information
- Born: 7 February 1938 (age 88)

Chess career
- Country: Greece
- Peak rating: 2165 (July 2004)

Nikolaos Ornithopoulos (Greek: Νικόλαος Ορνιθόπουλος; born 7 February 1938) is a Greek chess player.

== Biography ==
From the mid-1960s to the mid-1970s Nikolaos Ornithopoulos was one of Greek leading chess players.

Nikolaos Ornithopoulos played for Greece in the Chess Olympiads:

- In 1964, at second reserve board in the 16th Chess Olympiad in Tel Aviv (+2, =1, -3),
- In 1966, at second board in the 17th Chess Olympiad in Havana (+10, =2, -6),
- In 1968, at fourth board in the 18th Chess Olympiad in Lugano (+1, =3, -5).

Nikolaos Ornithopoulos played for Greece in the European Team Chess Championship preliminaries:

- In 1977, at fourth board in the 6th European Team Chess Championship preliminaries (+1, =1, -1).

In 1990s and 2000s Nikolaos Ornithopoulos participated in senior chess tournaments.
