= Aki Lahti =

Finnish chess player

Personal information
- Born: December 22, 1931
- Died: 1998

Chess career
- Country: Finland

Aki Lahti (22 December 1931 – 1998) was a Finnish chess player, Finnish Chess Championship medalist (1966, 1969).

== Biography ==
From the end of the 1950s to the begin 1970s, Aki Lahti was one of Finland's leading chess players. In Finnish Chess Championships he has won silver (1969) and bronze (1966) medals. In 1969, in Raach Aki Lahti participated in World Chess Championship Zonal tournament.

Aki Lahti played for Finland in the Chess Olympiads:

- In 1966, at first reserve board in the 17th Chess Olympiad in Havana (+1, =3, -4),
- In 1970, at first reserve board in the 19th Chess Olympiad in Siegen (+0, =1, -4).

Aki Lahti played for Finland in the World Student Team Chess Championships:

- In 1955, at first board in the 2nd World Student Team Chess Championship in Lyon (+3, =5, -3),
- In 1956, at second board in the 3rd World Student Team Chess Championship in Uppsala (+0, =2, -6).
