= Yoel Aloni =

Israeli chess player and problemist (1937–2019)

Yoel Aloni (Hebrew: יואל אלוני; September 30, 1937 – September 9, 2019) was an Israeli chess master and problemist. His twin brother, Hillel Aloni (1937–2017), was also a chess player.

He played twice for Israel in Chess Olympiads.

- In 1964, at fourth board in 16th Chess Olympiad in Tel Aviv (+4 –6 =4);
- In 1966, at first reserve board in 17th Chess Olympiad in Havana (+8 –1 =2).

He took 4th in Israel Chess Solving Championship at Tel Aviv 2005 (Ram Soffer won). He took 53rd in the 29th World Chess Solving Championship at Eretria in 2005 (Piotr Murdzia won).
