= Lazaros Vizantiadis =

Greek chess player (1938–2008)

Personal information
- Born: 2 April 1938
- Died: May 2008 (aged 70)

Chess career
- Country: Greece
- Title: International Master (1968)
- Peak rating: 2300 (January 1983)

Lazaros Vizantiadis (Greek: Λάζαρος Βυζαντιάδης; 2 April 1938 – May 2008) was a Greek chess International Master (IM) (1969), two-times Greek Chess Championship winner (1965, 1966).

== Biography ==
From the 1960s to the begin 1980s Lazaros Vizantiadis was one of Greek leading chess players. He twice won Greek Chess Championship: in 1965, and 1966. In 1967, in Vrnjačka Banja Lazaros Vizantiadis participated in World Chess Championship European Zonal Tournament where shared in 17th–18th place.

Lazaros Vizantiadis played for Greece in the Chess Olympiads:

- In 1962, at fourth board in the 15th Chess Olympiad in Varna (+2, =1, -8),
- In 1964, at third board in the 16th Chess Olympiad in Tel Aviv (+4, =5, -6),
- In 1966, at first board in the 17th Chess Olympiad in Havana (+6, =6, -6),
- In 1968, at first board in the 18th Chess Olympiad in Lugano (+3, =5, -6),
- In 1970, at second board in the 19th Chess Olympiad in Siegen (+2, =5, -6),
- In 1972, at second board in the 20th Chess Olympiad in Skopje (+4, =5, -7),
- In 1974, at fourth board in the 21st Chess Olympiad in Nice (+9, =4, -5).

Lazaros Vizantiadis played for Greece in the European Team Chess Championship preliminaries:

- In 1970, at first board in the 4th European Team Chess Championship preliminaries (+0, =3, -3),
- In 1973, at second board in the 5th European Team Chess Championship preliminaries (+1, =1, -1),
- In 1977, at fourth board in the 6th European Team Chess Championship preliminaries (+0, =1, -1),
- In 1980, at fourth board in the 7th European Team Chess Championship preliminaries (+0, =1, -0).

Lazaros Vizantiadis played for Greece in the Men's Chess Balkaniads:

- In 1971, at first board in the 3rd Men's Chess Balkaniad in Athens (+0, =3, -1),
- In 1972, at second board in the 4th Men's Chess Balkaniad in Sofia (+0, =1, -3),
- In 1973, at second board in the 5th Men's Chess Balkaniad in Poiana Brașov (+0, =3, -1),
- In 1975, at first board in the 7th Men's Chess Balkaniad in Istanbul (+0, =2, -2),
- In 1976, at first board in the 8th Men's Chess Balkaniad in Athens (+1, =1, -2),
- In 1977, at third reserve board in the 9th Men's Chess Balkaniad in Albena (+0, =3, -1),
- In 1978, at sixth board in the 10th Men's Chess Balkaniad in Băile Herculane (+0, =2, -2).

In 1969, Lazaros Vizantiadis was awarded the FIDE International Master (IM) title.
