= Rolf Roth =

Swiss chess player (born 1938)

Personal information
- Born: 2 June 1938 (age 88)

Chess career
- Country: Switzerland
- Title: FIDE Master (1983)
- Peak rating: 2400 (May 1974)

Rolf Roth (born 2 June 1938) is a Swiss chess FIDE Master (FM) and a Clare Benedict Cup and Mitropa Cup medalist (1964, 1976).

== Biography ==
In the 1960s and 1970s, Rolf Roth was one of the leading Swiss chess players. He often participated in Swiss Chess Championships and local chess tournaments. In 1966, in The Hague, Rolf Roth participated in the World Chess Championship European Zonal Tournament, in which he ranked 13th, beating grandmasters Lubomir Kavalek and Helmut Pfleger.

Rolf Roth played for Switzerland in the Chess Olympiads:

- In 1962, at the third board in the 15th Chess Olympiad in Varna (+7, =3, -7),
- In 1964, at the first reserve board in the 16th Chess Olympiad in Tel Aviv (+2, =7, -1),
- In 1966, at the fourth board in the 17th Chess Olympiad in Havana (+3, =3, -3).

Rolf Roth played for Switzerland in the European Team Chess Championship preliminaries:

- In 1961, at the seventh board in the 2nd European Team Chess Championship preliminaries (+1, =0, -1).

Rolf Roth played for Switzerland in the Men's Chess Mitropa Cup:

- In 1976, at the fourth board in the 1st Chess Mitropa Cup in Innsbruck (+0, =2, -1), winning a team silver medal.

Rolf Roth played for Switzerland in the Clare Benedict Cup:

- In 1964, at the reserve board in the 11th Clare Benedict Cup in Lenzerheide (+2, =2, -0), winning an individual gold medal.
