= Matti Rantanen (chess player) =

Finnish chess player

Personal information
- Born: 20 February 1911
- Died: 1996

Chess career
- Country: Finland

Matti Rantanen (20 February 1911 – 1996) was a Finnish chess player, four-time Finnish Chess Championship medalist (1948, 1955, 1960, 1966).

== Biography ==
From the late 1940s to the late 1960s, Matti Rantanen was one of Finland's leading chess players. In Finnish Chess Championships he has won three silver (1955, 1960, 1966) and bronze (1948) medals.

Matti Rantanen played for Finland in the Chess Olympiads:

- In 1954, at first reserve board in the 11th Chess Olympiad in Amsterdam (+5, =2, -4),
- In 1956, at third board in the 12th Chess Olympiad in Moscow (+4, =8, -2),
- In 1958, at third board in the 13th Chess Olympiad in Munich (+1, =6, -6),
- In 1960, at third board in the 14th Chess Olympiad in Leipzig (+6, =3, -7),
- In 1962, at third board in the 15th Chess Olympiad in Varna (+4, =8, -4),
- In 1964, at first reserve board in the 16th Chess Olympiad in Tel Aviv (+4, =4, -3),
- In 1966, at fourth board in the 17th Chess Olympiad in Havana (+3, =5, -4).

Matti Rantanen played for Finland in the European Team Chess Championship preliminaries:

- In 1961, at third board in the 2nd European Team Chess Championship preliminaries (+0, =2, -2).
