= Siracettin Bilyap =

Turkish chess player (1923–1996

Personal information
- Born: 10 December 1923 İstanbul, Turkey
- Died: 26 August 1996 (aged 72)

Chess career
- Title: Turkish Chess Champion

Siracettin Bilyap (10 December 1923 – 26 August 1996) was a Turkish chess player, university professor of Construction technology. He was the 1966 Turkish Chess Champion.

== Biography ==
Bilyap was born in Istanbul in 1923, graduated from Istanbul Technical University. He started working at Izmir Dokuz Eylul University, later become the Head of the Department of Construction at the Faculty of Engineering and Architecture, and Associate Professor in 1973 and Professor in 1980. He retired in 1990

As a chess player, he took part in the 16th, 17th, 18th, 19th, 20th and 21st Chess Olympiad Turkish National Team. He participated in the Turkish Chess Championship 14 times and became the Champion in 1966.

Bilyap died in 1996. In his memory, the 2017 Turkish Chess Championship was named after him Since 2001, Sıracettin Bilyap Memorial Chess Tournament has been traditionally held in İzmir.

=== Personal life ===
Siracettin Bilyap married to Zuhal Arı in 1949. The couple had two children, Muhsin born in 1951 and Enis born in 1960.

== Achievements ==
- 1966 Turkish Chess Championship – Champion
