= Augusto Menvielle Laccourreye =

Spanish chess player (born 1938)

Personal information
- Born: 12 August 1938 (age 88)

Chess career
- Country: Spain
- Title: FIDE Master (1984)
- Peak rating: 2380 (January 1988)

Augusto Menvielle Laccourreye (born 12 August 1938) is a Spanish chess FIDE Master (FM), Spanish Team Chess Championship winner (1973).

== Biography ==
From the end of 1950s to the mid-1970s, Augusto Menvielle Laccourreye was one of Spain's leading chess players. He has won five medals at the Spanish Team Chess Championships with chess clubs La Caja de Canaries and Real Madrid: gold (1973), three silver (1956, 1964, 1974) and bronze (1976).

Augusto Menvielle Laccourreye played for Spain in the Chess Olympiads:

- In 1964, at fourth board in the 16th Chess Olympiad in Tel Aviv (+1, =3, -7),
- In 1966, at third board in the 17th Chess Olympiad in Havana (+4, =3, -8).

Augusto Menvielle Laccourreye played for Spain in the European Team Chess Championship preliminaries:

- In 1961, at ninth board in the 2nd European Team Chess Championship preliminaries (+0, =1, -1),
- In 1970, at fourth board in the 4th European Team Chess Championship preliminaries (+2, =1, -0),
- In 1973, at seventh board in the 5th European Team Chess Championship preliminaries (+2, =0, -0).

Augusto Menvielle Laccourreye played for Spain in the European Team Chess Championship:

- In 1970, at eighth board in the 4th European Team Chess Championship in Kapfenberg (+0, =2, -5).
