= Jacek Bednarski =

Polish chess player (1939–2008)

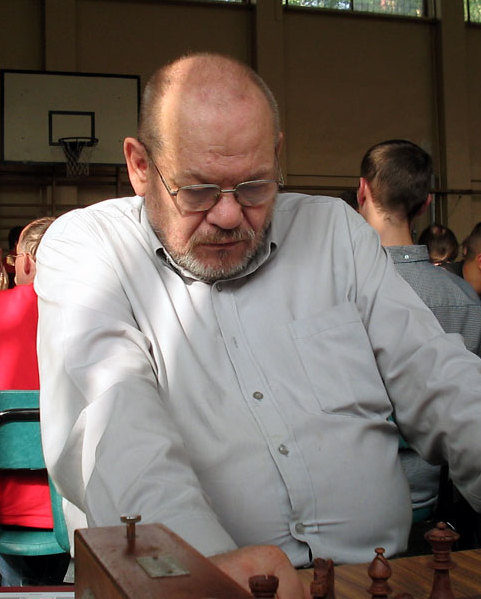
- Bednarski in Lublin, 2006

Personal information
- Born: Jacek Bogusław Bednarski; March 12, 1939 Kraków, Poland
- Died: 19 October 2008 (aged 69) Wrocław, Poland

Chess career
- Country: Poland
- Title: International Master (1964)
- Peak rating: 2425 (January 1975)

Jacek Bogusław Bednarski (12 March 1939 - 19 October 2008) was a Polish chess player and politician who won the Polish Chess Championship in 1963. He received the FIDE title of International Master (IM) in 1964.

== Chess career ==
Bednarski became interested in chess at the age of eleven. He met with a professional chess training while studying physics at the Moscow State University. After returning to the Poland Bednarski quickly became one of the leading Polish chess players and graduated from the Faculty of Philosophy in Jagiellonian University. From 1960 to 1979 he played fifteen times in the Polish Chess Championship's finals, and winning four medals: gold (1963), silver (1964) and two bronze (1972, 1975).

Bednarski represented the Poland in international matches and took part in more than sixty international tournaments. In 1967 he shared the seventh place (together with Jan Hein Donner) in very strongly Capablanca Memorial in Havana. In 1972 Bednarski won two international tournaments in Lublin and Hradec Králové. Three times he shared second place in the "Rilton Cup" tournament in Stockholm( 1976–1977, 1978–1979, 1979–1980).

Jacek Bednarski played for Poland in Chess Olympiads:

- In 1964, at second board in the 16th Chess Olympiad in Tel Aviv (+4, =7, -3),
- In 1966, at first board in the 17th Chess Olympiad in Havana (+8, =4, -3),
- In 1968, at second board in the 18th Chess Olympiad in Lugano (+2, =6, -3),
- In 1970, at reserve board in the 19th Chess Olympiad in Siegen (+6, =4, -3),
- In 1972, at second board in the 20th Chess Olympiad in Skopje (+5, =8, -4),

Jacek Bednarski played for Poland in European Team Chess Championship:

- In 1973, at third board in the 5th European Team Chess Championship in Bath (+1, =5, -1).

For the 2005 Polish parliamentary election he was a candidate for the political party Self-Defence of the Republic of Poland.
