= Edgar De Castro =

Filipino chess player (1942–2025)

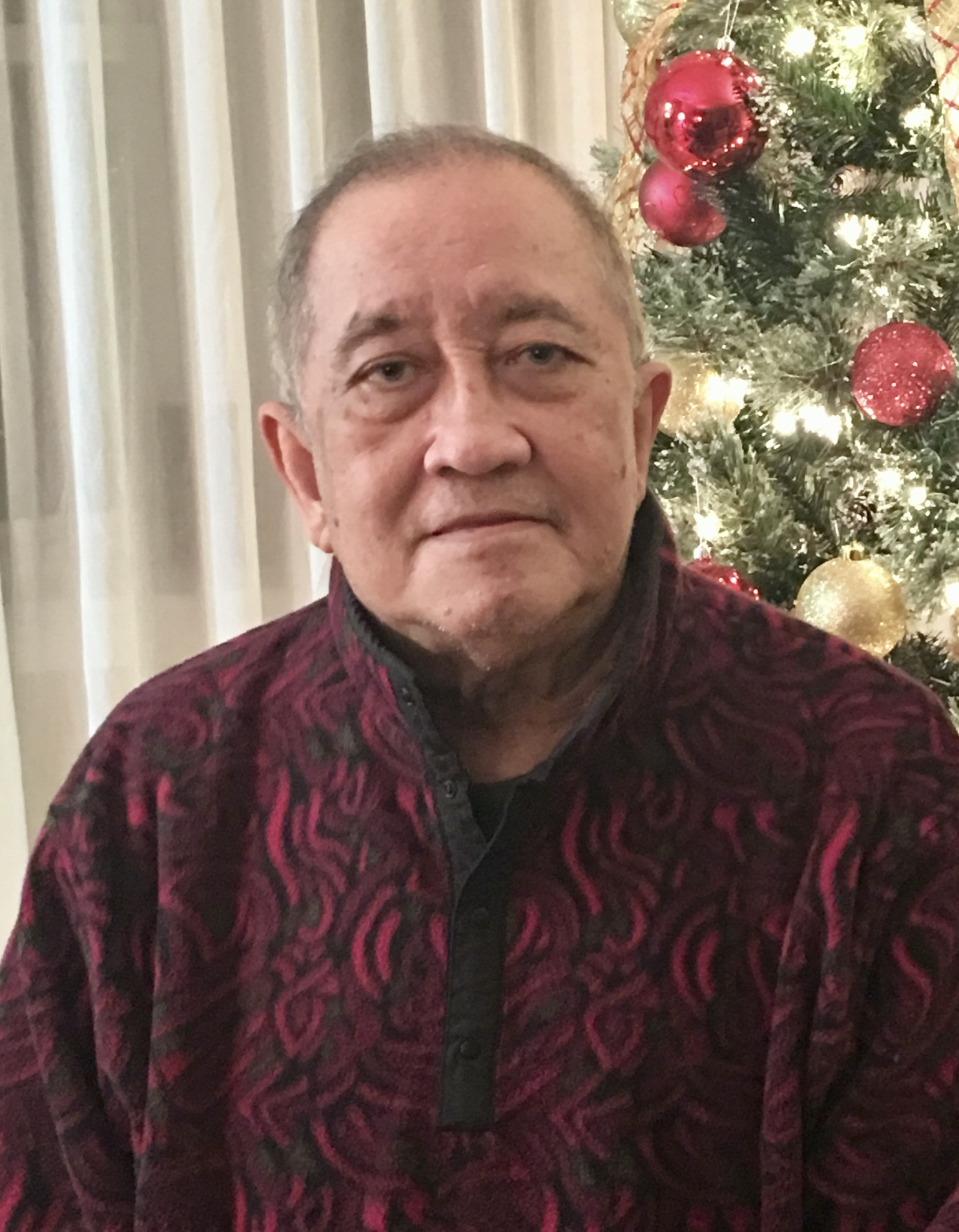
- De Castro at Christmas in 2018

Personal information
- Born: October 23, 1942 Manila, Philippines
- Died: September 28, 2025 (aged 82) Alexandria, Virginia

Chess career
- Country: Philippines
- Peak rating: 2385 (January 1990)

Edgar De Castro (October 23, 1942 – September 28, 2025) was a Filipino chess player & International Arbiter.

== Biography ==
From the beginning of the 1960s to the mid-1970s Edgar De Castro was one of the leading Filipino chess players. He three times participated in World Chess Championship South-East Asian Zonal tournaments (1966, 1969, 1972). His best result in this tournament was shared 5th–6th place in 1966.

Edgar De Castro played for the Philippines in the Chess Olympiads:

- In 1960, at first reserve board in the 14th Chess Olympiad in Leipzig (+3, =2, -3),
- In 1964, at second reserve board in the 16th Chess Olympiad in Tel Aviv (+2, =4, -4),
- In 1966, at second board in the 17th Chess Olympiad in Havana (+8, =6, -6),
- In 1968, at third board in the 18th Chess Olympiad in Lugano (+4, =3, -5),
- In 1970, at fourth board in the 19th Chess Olympiad in Siegen (+2, =8, -3),
- In 1972, at fourth board in the 20th Chess Olympiad in Skopje (+4, =4, -6).

In 1990, Edgar De Castro was awarded the FIDE International Arbiter (IA) title.
