= Christos Papapostolou =

Greek chess player (born 1929)

Personal information
- Born: 5 May 1929 (age 97)

Chess career
- Country: Greece

Christos Papapostolou (Greek: Χρήστος Παπαποστόλου; born 5 May 1929) is a Greek chess player.

== Biography ==
Papapostolou played for Greece in the Chess Olympiads:

- In 1960, at third board in the 14th Chess Olympiad in Leipzig (+3, =4, -12),
- In 1962, at third board in the 15th Chess Olympiad in Varna (+2, =0, -9),
- In 1964, at first reserve board in the 16th Chess Olympiad in Tel Aviv (+9, =0, -6),
- In 1966, at first reserve board in the 17th Chess Olympiad in Havana (+8, =4, -3),
- In 1970, at second reserve board in the 19th Chess Olympiad in Siegen (+5, =1, -3).

Papapostolou played for Greece in the European Team Chess Championship preliminaries:

- In 1970, at reserve board in the 4th European Team Chess Championship preliminaries (+0, =1, -4),
- In 1973, at sixth board in the 5th European Team Chess Championship preliminaries (+1, =0, -2).

Papapostolou played for Greece in the Men's Chess Balkaniad:

- In 1971, at fifth board in the 3rd Men's Chess Balkaniad in Athens (+0, =2, -2).

In 1990s and 2000s Papapostolou participated in senior chess tournaments.
