= Aarne Ilmari Niemelä =

Finnish chess player (1907–1975)

Personal information
- Born: September 16, 1907 Miehikkälä, Finland
- Died: November 12, 1975 (aged 68) Helsinki, Finland

Chess career
- Country: Finland

Aarne Ilmari Niemelä (16 September 1907 – 12 November 1975) was a Finnish chess player and Finnish Chess Championship winner (1948).

From the late 1940s to the late 1960s, Aarne Ilmari Niemelä was one of Finland's leading chess players. In Finnish Chess Championships he has won gold (1948) and three bronze (1956, 1959, 1962) medals. Aarne Ilmari Niemelä two times participated in FIDE European Zonal tournaments (1957, 1961). In 1959, he participated in International Chess tournament in Riga where ranked 12th place.

Aarne Ilmari Niemelä played for Finland in the Chess Olympiads:

- In 1950, at fourth board in the 9th Chess Olympiad in Dubrovnik (+3, =4, -3),
- In 1952, at second reserve board in the 10th Chess Olympiad in Helsinki (+0, =0, -2),
- In 1956, at second reserve board in the 12th Chess Olympiad in Moscow (+4, =2, -5),
- In 1960, at second reserve board in the 14th Chess Olympiad in Leipzig (+5, =4, -3),
- In 1962, at fourth board in the 15th Chess Olympiad in Varna (+3, =9, -3),
- In 1964, at fourth board in the 16th Chess Olympiad in Tel Aviv (+6, =2, -5),
- In 1966, at second reserve board in the 17th Chess Olympiad in Havana (+2, =1, -3).

Aarne Ilmari Niemelä played for Finland in the European Team Chess Championship preliminaries:

- In 1961, at six board (+1, =2, -1).
