= Eduardo Pérez Gonsalves =

Spanish chess player (1933–2016)

Personal information
- Born: 8 April 1933 Manuel, Spain
- Died: 26 July 2016 Sant Cugat del Vallès, Spain

Chess career
- Country: Spain

Eduardo Pérez Gonsalves or Gosalbes (8 April 1933 – 26 July 2016) was a Spanish chess player, Spanish Team Chess Championship winner (1967).

== Biography ==
From the begin of 1960s to the mid-1970s, Eduardo Pérez Gonsalves was one of Spain's leading chess players. He has won four medals at the Spanish Team Chess Championships with Barcelona chess clubs: gold (1967), silver (1975) and two bronze (1964, 1969).

Eduardo Pérez Gonsalves played for Spain in the Chess Olympiads:

- In 1964, at second reserve board in the 16th Chess Olympiad in Tel Aviv (+1, =6, -4),
- In 1966, at second reserve board in the 17th Chess Olympiad in Havana (+1, =2, -3).

Eduardo Pérez Gonsalves played for Spain in the European Team Chess Championship preliminaries:

- In 1961, at reserve board in the 2nd European Team Chess Championship preliminaries (+1, =1, -2),
- In 1965, at reserve board in the 3rd European Team Chess Championship preliminaries (+2, =0, -0),
- In 1970, at reserve board in the 4th European Team Chess Championship preliminaries (+1, =0, -0),
- In 1973, at sixth board in the 5th European Team Chess Championship preliminaries (+1, =1, -0).

Eduardo Pérez Gonsalves played for Spain in the European Team Chess Championships:

- In 1961, at ninth board in the 2nd European Team Chess Championship in Oberhausen (+1, =1, -4),
- In 1970, at ninth board in the 4th European Team Chess Championship in Kapfenberg (+0, =3, -3).

Eduardo Pérez Gonsalves played for Spain in the Clare Benedict Cup:

- In 1966, at reserve board in the 13th Clare Benedict Chess Cup in Brunnen (+0, =1, -0) and won team silver medal.
