= Armando Acevedo Milan =

Mexican chess player (born 1937)

Personal information
- Born: 4 July 1937 (age 89)

Chess career
- Country: Mexico
- Title: FIDE Master (1983)
- Peak rating: 2375 (January 1977)

Armando Acevedo Milan (born 4 July 1937) is a Mexican chess player.

== Biography ==
From the mid-1960s to the early 1970s, Armando Acevedo Milan was one of the leading chess players in Mexico. He was a former Mexico City Chess Championship winner. In 1966 in Willemstad Armando Acevedo Milan played for Mexico in 4th CACAC Team Chess Championship and won team silver medal.

Armando Acevedo Milan played for Mexico in the Chess Olympiad:

- In 1966, at second board in the 17th Chess Olympiad in Havana (+3, =2, -3),
- In 1970, at second board in the 19th Chess Olympiad in Siegen (+3, =10, -4).

Armando Acevedo Milan was the first Mexican FIDE master. He was founder of the most popular chess website in Mexico and former president of the Mexican Chess Federation (FENAMAC).
