= Raúl Ceferino Cruz =

Argentine chess player (1934–1985)

Personal information
- Born: 28 January 1934
- Died: 1985 (aged 50–51)

Chess career
- Country: Argentina

Raúl Ceferino Cruz (28 January 1934 — 1985), was an Argentine chess player, three-times Argentine Chess Championship medalist (1961, 1962, 1964), World Junior Chess Championship medalist (1951).

== Biography ==
In the 1950s and 1960s, Raúl Ceferino Cruz was one of Argentina's leading young chess players. In 1951, in England he participated in 1st World Junior Chess Championship and won bronze medal. From 1960 to 1965 Raúl Ceferino Cruz six times participated in the Argentine Chess Championship finals and won three medals: silver (1964) and two bronze (1961, 1962). He was participant a number of major International Chess Tournaments in South America.

Raúl Ceferino Cruz played for Argentina in the Chess Olympiad:

- In 1964, at first reserve board in the 16th Chess Olympiad in Tel Aviv (+2, =3, -4).
