= Miguel Colón Romero =

Puerto Rican chess player (1919–1998)

Personal information
- Born: 2 May 1919 Fajardo, Puerto Rico
- Died: 2 December 1998 (aged 79) San Juan, Puerto Rico

Chess career
- Country: Puerto Rico

Miguel Colón Romero (2 May 1919 - 2 December 1998) was a Puerto Rican chess player, who won the Puerto Rico Chess Championships six times (in 1948, 1957, 1961, 1964, 1969, 1980).

== Chess career ==
Like his brother Arturo, Miguel Colón Romero distinguished himself in chess in the city of Río Piedras, representing Puerto Rico in the international chess tournaments, during its active participation for 45 years. He won the Puerto Rico Chess Championships in 1948, 1957, 1961, 1964, 1969, and 1980. Also Miguel Colón Romero won the San Juan City Chess Championships from 1941 to 1944. In 1969 he participated in FIDE World Chess Championship Central American zonal tournament and ranked in 8th place. Miguel Colón Romero played for Puerto Rico in the CACAC Team Chess Championship and won several medals: 3 gold (1966, 1968, 1970), silver (1965) and bronze (1963).

Miguel Colón Romero played for Puerto Rico in the Chess Olympiads:

- In 1956, at second board in the 12th Chess Olympiad in Moscow (+1, =6, -5),
- In 1962, at first reserve board in the 15th Chess Olympiad in Varna (+5, =3, -5),
- In 1964, at first board in the 16th Chess Olympiad in Tel Aviv (+3, =3, -8),
- In 1966, at second board in the 17th Chess Olympiad in Havana (+3, =10, -5),
- In 1970, at second board in the 19th Chess Olympiad in Siegen (+1, =5, -10),
- In 1972, at second reserve board in the 20th Chess Olympiad in Skopje (+3, =3, -2),
- In 1980, at first board in the 24th Chess Olympiad in La Valletta (+1, =2, -6).

Miguel Colón Romero was the founder of the Santurce Chess Club, occupying for many years the position of Treasurer of the Puerto Rico Chess Federation, then becoming president in 1973.
