= Christian Langeweg =

Dutch chess player (born 1937)

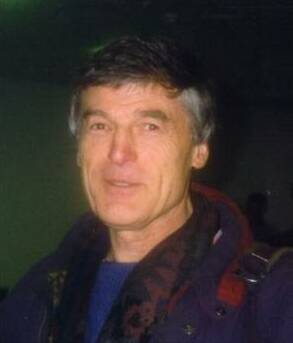

Personal information
- Born: 7 March 1937 (age 89)

Chess career
- Country: Netherlands
- Title: International Master (1962)
- Peak rating: 2455 (January 1981)

Christian Langeweg or Kick Langeweg (born 7 March 1937), is a Dutch chess International Master (IM) (1962), five-times Dutch Chess Championship medalist (1969, 1970, 1972, 1980, 1983) and Chess Olympiad three-times individual medalist (1966, 1970, 1980).

== Biography ==
In the 1960s and 1970s, Christian Langeweg was one of the leading Dutch chess players. He is multiple medalist of the Dutch Chess Championship: twice won silver medals (1969, 1980) and won bronze medals three times (1970, 1972, 1983). In 1961, in Amsterdam Christian Langeweg won the IBM international chess tournament. In 1974, he won the International Chess Tournament in Plovdiv. In 1976, in Zürich he ranked in 4th place in the first Switzerland Open Chess Championship. In 1962, he was awarded the FIDE International Master (IM) title.

Christian Langeweg played for Netherlands in the Chess Olympiads:

- In 1960, at second reserve board in the 14th Chess Olympiad in Leipzig (+0, =1, -3),
- In 1962, at fourth board in the 15th Chess Olympiad in Varna (+4, =5, -5),
- In 1964, at third board in the 16th Chess Olympiad in Tel Aviv (+8, =4, -5),
- In 1966, at fourth board in the 17th Chess Olympiad in Havana (+10, =4, -1) and won individual gold medal,
- In 1968, at third board in the 18th Chess Olympiad in Lugano (+5, =3, -4),
- In 1970, at third board in the 19th Chess Olympiad in Siegen (+8, =6, -1) and won individual bronze medal,
- In 1978, at second reserve board in the 23rd Chess Olympiad in Buenos Aires (+2, =4, -2),
- In 1980, at fourth board in the 24th Chess Olympiad in La Valletta (+4, =5, -0) and won individual silver medal.

Christian Langeweg played for Netherlands in the European Team Chess Championships:

- In 1965, at second board in the 3rd European Team Chess Championship in Hamburg (+1, =4, -5),
- In 1983, at first reserve board in the 8th European Team Chess Championship in Plovdiv (+0, =1, -2).

Christian Langeweg played for Netherlands in the World Student Team Chess Championships:

- In 1960, at first board in the 7th World Student Team Chess Championship in Leningrad (+4, =2, -7),
- In 1961, at first board in the 8th World Student Team Chess Championship in Helsinki (+3, =1, -8),
- In 1962, at first board in the 9th World Student Team Chess Championship in Mariánské Lázně (+6, =2, -4),
- In 1963, at first board in the 10th World Student Team Chess Championship in Budva (+5, =6, -1).

Also Christian Langeweg ten times played for Netherlands in the Clare Benedict Chess Cups (1961-1962, 1966–1970, 1972–1974) where in team competition won 2 gold (1966, 1969) and 2 silver (1968, 1972) medals, and in individual competition won gold (1966) medal.
