= Günther Möhring =

German chess player

Personal information
- Born: 25 November 1936 Gera, Germany
- Died: 14 January 2006 (aged 69) Berlin, Germany

Chess career
- Country: Germany
- Title: International Master (IM) (1976)

Günther Möhring (25 November 1936 – 14 January 2006) was a German chess International Master (IM) (1976), East Germany Chess Championship winner (1963), Chess Olympiad individual gold medalist (1964).

== Biography ==
Günther Möhring learned to play chess at the age of ten. In 1955 he won 2nd place in the German Youth Chess Championship. Also he won the German Youth Correspondence Chess Championship (1956-1958). Günther Möhring made the biggest success of his chess career in 1963, when he won the East Germany Chess Championship. In 1968, together with the Halle Chess Club he won the East Germany Team Chess Cup. In 1976, he was awarded the FIDE International Master (IM) title.

Günther Möhring played for East Germany in the Chess Olympiad:

- In 1964, at second reserve board in the 16th Chess Olympiad in Tel Aviv (+11, =2, -1) and won individual gold medal.

Also Günther Möhring four times played for East Germany in the World Student Team Chess Championships (1959, 1961-1963) and won team bronze medal (1961).

In 1968, Günther Möhring won East Germany Go Championship. By profession he was a mathematics teacher.
