= Olavo Yépez =

Ecuadorian chess master (1937–2021)

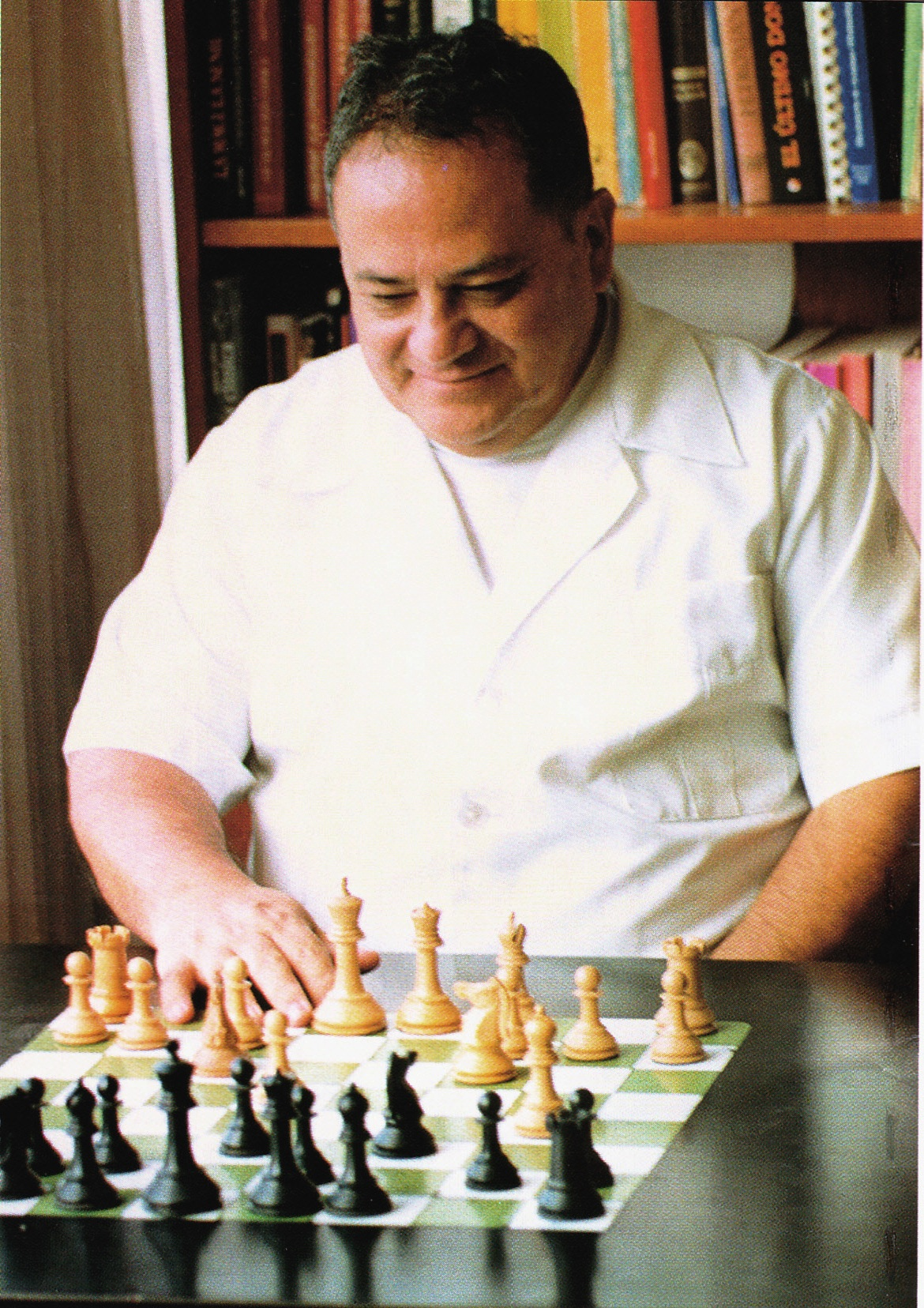

Personal information
- Born: Olavo Yépez Obando; 20 August 1937 San Gabriel, Carchi, Ecuador
- Died: 17 May 2021 (aged 83)

Chess career
- Country: Ecuador
- Title: International Master (1969)
- Peak rating: 2390 (January 1979 FIDE rating list)

Olavo Yépez Obando (20 August 1937 – 17 May 2021) was an Ecuadorian chess master.

He was born in San Gabriel in the Carchi province of Ecuador. Yépez won the Ecuadorian Chess Championship at Pichincha 1962, took 9th at Mar del Plata 1962 (Torneo Latino-americano, Raimundo García won), tied for 3rd–6th at Havana 1966 (Pan American Chess Championship, Eleazar Jiménez won), played at Caracas 1967 (zonal, Miguel Cuéllar won), took 2nd, behind Silvino Garcia Martinez, at Santa Clara 1968, shared 1st with Eleazar Jiménez Zerquera at Quito/Guayaquil 1969 (zonal), took 15th at Caracas 1970 (Oscar Panno, Leonid Stein and Lubomir Kavalek won), took 3rd at Caracas 1973 (Kenneth Frey Beckman won), and took 2nd, behind Jorge Rubinetti, at Quito 1975.

Olavo Yépez played thrice for Ecuador in Chess Olympiads (Tel Aviv 1964, Havana 1966, and Nice 1974) at first board.

He was awarded the International Master title in 1969.

He died of cancer on 17 May 2021, at the age of 83.
