= Arturo Colón Romero =

Puerto Rican chess player (born 1928)

Personal information
- Born: 19 June 1928 (age 98) Fajardo, Puerto Rico

Chess career
- Country: Puerto Rico

Arturo Colón Romero (born 19 June 1928) is a Puerto Rican chess player, who six times won Puerto Rico Chess Championships (1956, 1962, 1966, 1968, 1973, 1974).

== Chess career ==
Like his brother Miguel, Arturo Colón Romero distinguished himself in chess in the city of Río Piedras, representing Puerto Rico in the international chess tournaments, during its active participation for 46 years. He six times won Puerto Rico Chess Championships in 1956, 1962, 1966, 1968, 1973, and 1974. Also Arturo Colón Romero won San Juan City Chess Championships in 1945, 1955, 1981, 1983, and 1984. He represented Puerto Rico in the Central American and Caribbean Games in 1946. In the international arena Arturo Colón Romero obtained important triumphs against recognized and famous international and world masters, such as next world World Chess Champion Bobby Fischer in an exhibition match in San Juan in 1959, and Grandmaster Larry Evans (1949) and International Master Herman Steiner (1948).

Arturo Colón Romero played for Puerto Rico in the Chess Olympiads:

- In 1956, at first board in the 12th Chess Olympiad in Moscow (+4, =2, -7),
- In 1962, at first board in the 15th Chess Olympiad in Varna (+0, =0, -4),
- In 1966, at first board in the 17th Chess Olympiad in Havana (+1, =0, -5),
- In 1968, at third board in the 18th Chess Olympiad in Lugano (+6, =3, -7),
- In 1974, at third board in the 21st Chess Olympiad in Nice (+6, =6, -3).

Arturo Colón Romero played for Puerto Rico in the CACAC Team Chess Championship and won full complete of medals: gold (1966), silver (1965) and bronze (1963).

Arturo Colón Romero promoted sports-science by founding the Rosendo Matienzo Cintrón Middle School and Central High School Chess Club, occupying the Vice-Presidency of the Puerto Rico in 1982 and integrating the board of directors of the United States Chess Federation in that year.
