= Michael Fallone =

Scottish chess player

Personal information
- Born: 23 November 1938 (age 87) Bellshill, Scotland

Chess career
- Country: United Kingdom

Michael Fallone (born 23 November 1938) is a Scottish chess player, Scottish Chess Championship winner (1963).

== Biography ==
Michael Fallone showed great promise as a junior chess player. In 1954 he won the Glasgow Junior Chess Championship with a perfect result: 8 wins in 8 rounds. Also Michael Fallone represented Scotland in Glorney Cups between 1952 and 1957. He played for Scotland team against England team in the chess matches in 1955, 1958 and 1962.

Michael Fallone competed in several Scottish Chess Championships. In 1956 he captured second place without loss. Year later Michael Fallone scored 6½ from 9 and joint 2nd-4th places. In 1958 he shared 3rd-4th places. In 1963 Michael Fallone won Scottish Chess Championship.

Michael Fallone played for Scotland in the Chess Olympiads:

- In 1956, at second board in the 12th Chess Olympiad in Moscow (+0, =4, -7),
- In 1964, at third board in the 16th Chess Olympiad in Tel Aviv (+7, =4, -6),
- In 1966, at second board in the 17th Chess Olympiad in Havana (+4, =4, -9).

In recent years, Michael Fallone less frequently participates in chess tournaments.
