= Juan Minaya Molano =

Colombian chess player (born 1941)

Personal information
- Born: 20 November 1941 (age 84)

Chess career
- Country: Colombia
- Title: FIDE Master (1988)
- Peak rating: 2355 (January 1977)

Juan Manuel Minaya Molano (born 20 November 1941) is a Colombian chess FIDE Master (FM) and Colombian Chess Championship winner (1963).

== Biography ==
From the early 1960s to the mid-2000s, Juan Minaya Molano was one of Colombia's leading chess players. He won the Colombian Chess Championship in 1963. Juan Minaya Molano participated in the World Junior Chess Championship (1961), the World Chess Championship's Central American Zonal tournaments (1960, 1963) and the Pan American Chess Championships (2005, 2007).

Juan Minaya Molano played for Colombia in the Chess Olympiads:

- In 1964, at the second board in the 16th Chess Olympiad in Tel Aviv (+6, =5, -4),
- In 1966, at the fourth board in the 17th Chess Olympiad in Havana (+8, =3, -5),
- In 1972, at the first reserve board in the 20th Chess Olympiad in Skopje (+4, =6, -4),
- In 1976, at the third board in the 22nd Chess Olympiad in Haifa (+2, =5, -3).
