= Zandor Nilsson =

Swedish chess player (1913–1973)

Personal information
- Born: July 2, 1913 Stockholm, Sweden
- Died: July 1, 1973 (aged 59) Stockholm, Sweden

Chess career
- Country: Sweden
- Title: International Correspondence Chess Master (1961)

Zandor Nilsson (July 2, 1913, Stockholm – July 1, 1973, Stockholm) was a Swedish chess player, who two times won Swedish Chess Championship.

== Biography ==
In 1957 Zandor Nilsson won Swedish Chess Championship in Stockholm. In 1965 he repeated this success in Falköping.

Nilsson played for Sweden in seven Chess Olympiads and won individual bronze medal in 1958:

- In 1954, at reserve board in the 11th Chess Olympiad in Amsterdam (+5 −6 =2);
- In 1958, at fourth board in the 13th Chess Olympiad in Munich (+10 −4 =2);
- In 1960, at fourth board in the 14th Chess Olympiad in Leipzig (+10 −3 =3);
- In 1962, at third board in the 15th Chess Olympiad in Varna (+4 −6 =3);
- In 1964, at fourth board in the 16th Chess Olympiad in Tel Aviv (+7 −4 =2);
- In 1966, at second board in the 17th Chess Olympiad in Havana (+6 −9 =1);
- In 1968, at second board in the 18th Chess Olympiad in Lugano (+3 −5 =3).

In 1962 Nilsson played for Sweden in World Student Team Chess Championship. In 1970 he played for Sweden in Nordic Chess Cup. He won team silver medal and individual gold medal.

Nilsson was also a successful correspondence chess player. He was awarded the ICCF International Correspondence Chess Master (IMC) title in 1961.
