= Ove Kinnmark =

Swedish chess player

Ove Kinnmark (24 December 1944 – 26 October 2015) was a Swedish chess master.

At the beginning of his career, he won Swedish Junior championships at Växjö 1958, and played at Halle 1963 (zonal). He represented thrice Sweden in Chess Olympiads (1966, 1970, 1974).
