= Traian Stanciu =

Romanian chess player (1935–2019)

Personal information
- Born: 14 September 1935
- Died: 10 November 2019 (aged 84)

Chess career
- Country: Romania
- Title: FIDE Master (1981)
- Peak rating: 2400 (January 1982)

Traian Stanciu (14 September 1935 – 10 November 2019) was a Romanian chess player, FIDE Master (FM) and Romanian Chess Championship medalist (1963).

== Biography ==
In the 1960s, Traian Stanciu was one of the strongest Romanian chess players. He won a bronze medal in the Romanian Chess Championship in 1963.

Traian Stanciu played for Romania in the Chess Olympiad:

- In 1966, at the second reserve board in the 17th Chess Olympiad in Havana (+3, =2, -2).

Traian Stanciu played for Romania in the European Team Chess Championship:

- In 1965, at the seventh board in the 3rd European Team Chess Championship in Hamburg (+2, =5, -3).

Traian Stanciu played for Romania in the World Student Team Chess Championship:

- In 1965, at the third board in the 12th World Student Team Chess Championship in Sinaia (+5, =3, -3).
