= Trotzky Augusto Yepez Obando =

Personal information
- Born: 17 January 1940 San Gabriel, Carchi, Ecuador
- Died: 2 August 2010 (aged 70) Quito, Ecuador

Chess career
- Country: Ecuador
- Title: National Master
- Peak rating: 2250 (January 1979)

Trotzky Augusto Yepez Obando (January 17, 1940 – August 2, 2010) was an Ecuadorian chess player.

Yepez was born in San Gabriel, Carchi, on January 17, 1940. Second son of Rodolfo Yepez and Otilia Obando, he was an outstanding student in his classrooms. Together with his two brothers he moved to Quito in 1954, where he first attended "Instituto Nacional Mejía" High School, and later the Central University of Ecuador, where he gained his engineer degree in 1964. The University Council awarded him with a gold medal for his achievements and distinguished him with the title of "the best student of all times". Married with Genoveva Navarrete, he had two daughters, Vivian and Yarka.

Since childhood and throughout his life, chess was his great passion. His father taught him the first lessons using an antique chess game inherited from his grandmother Amada Guerrero Paez. His passion grew bigger through the time while studying by himself the Grand Masters Games and the FIDE Informants, which eventually led him to achieve the National Chess Championship twice, in September 1968, and 1982, as well as the second place in the National Championship of November 1983. He was granted with the FIDE's title of National Master with a registered score of 2180. Yepez was part of the Ecuadorian delegation in several international Championships and Tournaments: 16th Chess Olympiad of Tel Aviv 1964, 17th Chess Olympiad of Havana 1966, 18th Chess Olympiad of Lugano 1968, Open Tournament of Nice - 1974 (Capitan), Panamerican Tournament of Havana, 1968, II Tournament "Apertura" - Bogotá, 1970, Tournament "Ecopetrol - El Tiempo" - Bogotá, 1970, VIII Caribbean and Central America Zone Tournament FIDE, Bogotá – 1972. He was also an active participant in local tournaments, the most important: National Tournament of "Secretaria de Integracion Colombo - Ecuatoriana", First Place - April 11, 1970; International Tournament "Ciudad de Quito" - Concentración Deportiva de Pichincha, November 1975; Tournament "Simón Bolívar" - Club de Ajedrez "El Nacional", First Place - 1975; International Tournament Yacht Club Guayas - Federación Deportiva del Guayas, 1977; Open Tournament - "Comité de Ajedrez de Pichincha", Second Place - First Category, Azoguez, July 1987; Open Tournament - Filanbanco, First Place - Portoviejo, June 1993.

== Notable achievements ==
Yepez has contributed to the Ecuadorian chess history with notable distinctions and particular style. His first national Championship was held after a nine-hour match, when he defeated Francisco Aguirre with a final score of 2½–½, using the Grünfeld Defence. Another notable incident occurred during the Tournament "Ecopetrol - El Tiempo", where Yepez recorded a historic draw by agreement with Henrique Costa Mecking, who was regarded as one of the greatest chess players in the world. In the same event, he gained noteworthy victories over Carlos "El Mago" Cuartas, the National Colombian Champion. and Miguel Cuéllar. His match with Cuéllar took 84 movements and nine hours match, making it the longest of the contest.

In an effort to promote chess locally, Yepez and friends founded the "Club de Ajedrez Quito". During its existence, the Club organized some local tournaments with the best national chess players at the time, but finally it was closed due to lack of financial support.

In his last days, while struggling against the hardships of his illness, he managed to play his last matches in bed, leaving a chess book on his night table marked in a certain page with a little chess horse just a few days before his death on August 2, 2010.

The "Concentracion Deportiva de Pichincha" paid him homage "In Memoriam" with the 2010 Quito tournament "XV Prix Nacional de Ajedrez - Cuarta Parada Ing. Trotzky Yepez", and by naming the Chess School Audiovisual room after him.
