= Reinhart Fuchs =

German chess player

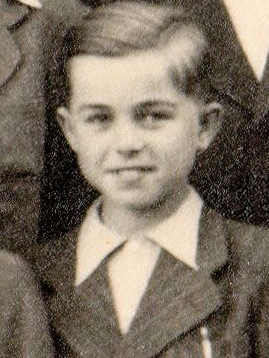
Reinhart Fuchs, 1949

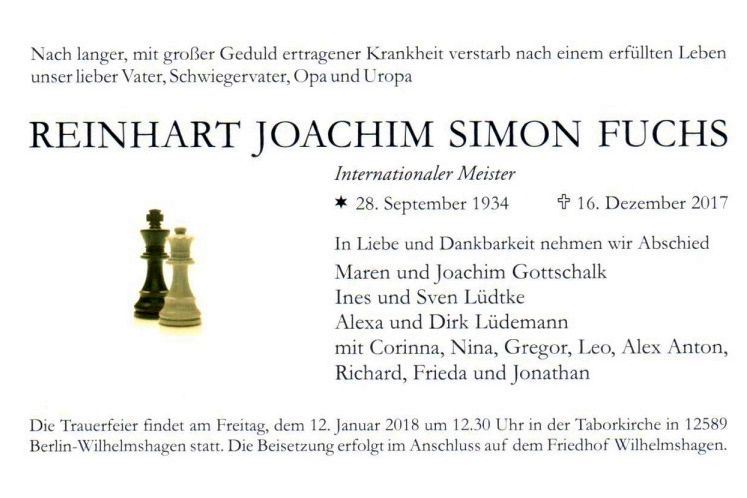
Fuchs: death notice

Reinhart Fuchs (September 28, 1934, Berlin – December 16, 2017, Berlin) was a German chess player, international master (1962).

In the national team of the GDR party of six Chess Olympiads (1956–1966) and IV European team championship (1970) in Kapfenberg.
