= Burkhard Malich =

German chess grandmaster (born 1936)

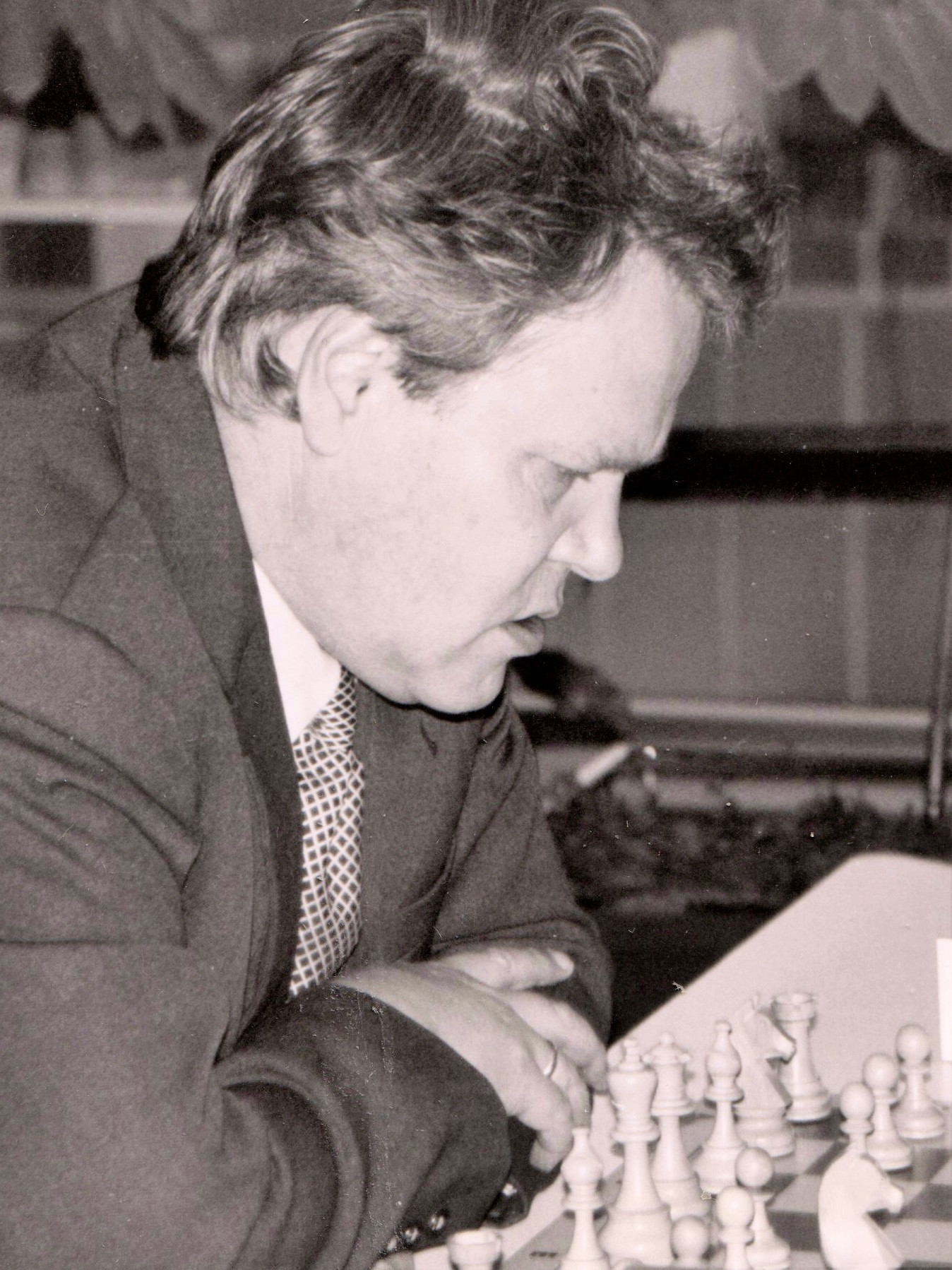
- Malich in 1994

Personal information
- Full name: Burkhard Georg Josef Malich
- Born: 29 November 1936 (age 89) Schweidnitz, Silesia, Germany

Chess career
- Country: East Germany; Germany
- Title: Grandmaster (1975)
- Peak rating: 2535 (January 1977)
- Peak ranking: No. 47 (January 1976)

Burkhard Malich (born 29 November 1936 in Schweidnitz, Silesia (now Świdnica, Poland)) is a German chess Grandmaster. He is a retired university lecturer who received his Ph. D in 1971 and until 2001 taught Byzantine history at Martin Luther University of Halle-Wittenberg.

== Chess career ==
Malich learned chess in 1948 at the age of 12. Three years later he won the East German Youth Championship, repeating the feat in 1953. Malich won the individual championship of East Germany in 1957 and 1973, and six times finished second. At the international level, he qualified for the zonal tournaments in 1963 and 1974 and won tournaments at Zinnowitz in three consecutive years from 1969 to 1971, Amsterdam in 1971, Děčín in 1976 and Leipzig in 1977.

Malich also played successfully in several team competitions, 10 times winning the East German Team Championship as a member of the SV Wissenschaft Halle, SC Chemie Halle and Buna Halle teams. After the German reunification, Malich played in the 1990/1991 season for Buna Halle and in the 1993/1994 for PSV Duisburg in the Chess Bundesliga.

He played for the East German team in all eight Olympiads between 1958 and 1972, and won the bronze medal in the 1970 European Team Chess Championship. In 2004, he was a member of the winning German team in the inaugural World Senior Team Championship.

He continues to play in team events, and as of July 2013 has an Elo rating of 2347.
