= Theodor Ghițescu =

Romanian chess player

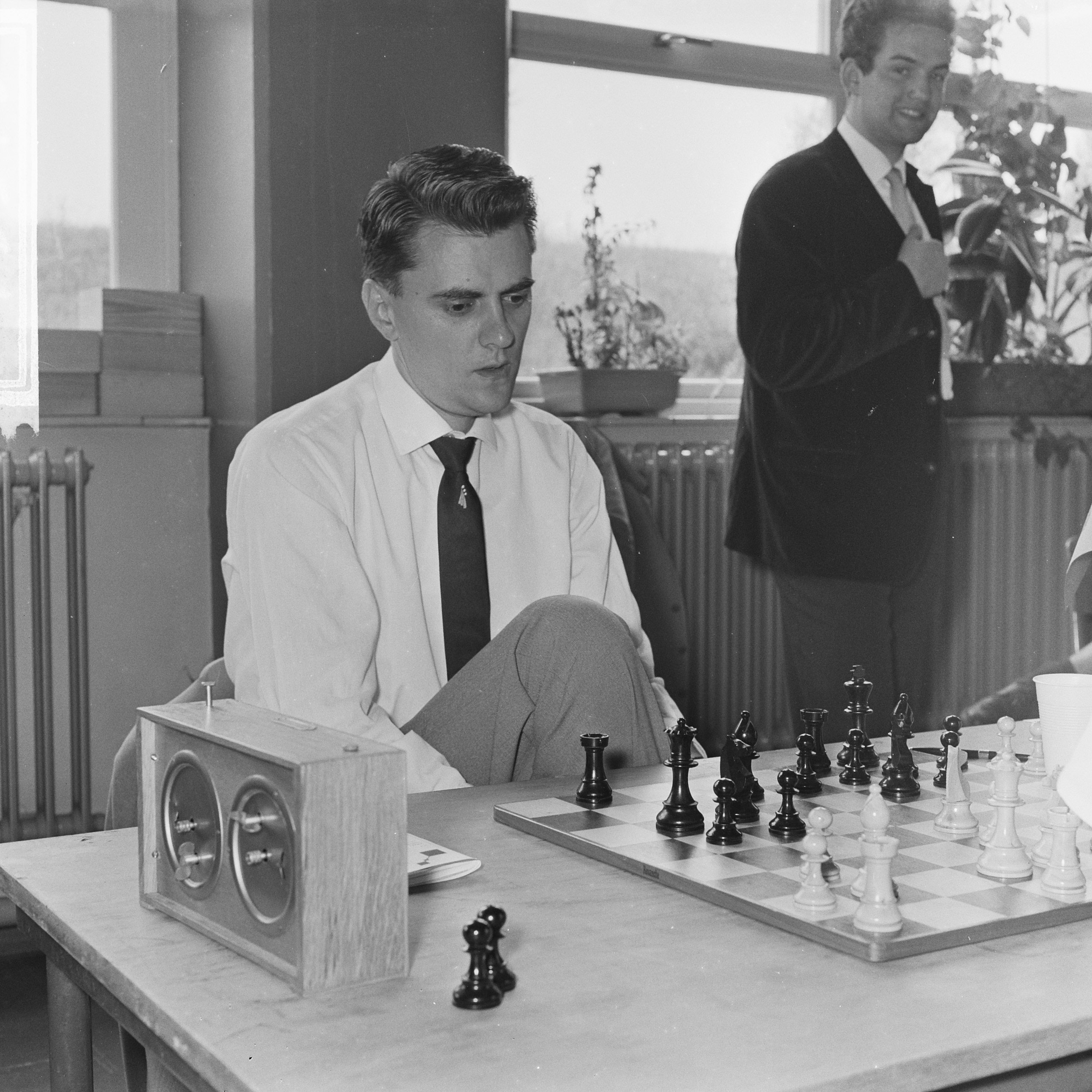
Ghițescu (1965)

Theodor Ghițescu (24 January 1934 ─ 22 November 2008) was a Romanian chess player. He was Romanian champion in 1963, and represented Romania at twelve chess olympiads from 1956 until 1984. He was awarded the International Master title in 1962, and in 1986 he was awarded the honorary Grandmaster title.

His tournament successes include wins at the Wijk aan Zee B tournament in 1966 and 1973, and at the Bucharest International tournament of 1976 (ahead of Jozsef Pinter and Evgeny Sveshnikov).

He competed in several Romanian championships, winning the event in 1963, finishing second in 1961, 1972, 1975 and 1977 and finishing third in 1959 and 1971. His peak FIDE rating was 2460 in the July 1971 list.
