= William Addison (chess player) =

American chess player (1933–2008)

Personal information
- Born: William Grady Addison; November 28, 1933 Baton Rouge, Louisiana, U.S.
- Died: October 29, 2008 (aged 74) San Francisco, California, U.S.

Chess career
- Country: United States
- Title: International Master (1967)
- Peak rating: 2490 (July 1971)
- Peak ranking: No. 78 (July 1972)

William Grady "Bill" Addison (November 28, 1933 in Baton Rouge, Louisiana – October 29, 2008 in San Francisco) was an American chess International Master (1967).

He played in the U.S. Chess Championships of 1962–63, 1963–64, 1965, 1966, and 1969. He took second place with 7.5/11 behind Samuel Reshevsky in the 1969 US Championship and qualified for the 1970 Interzonal at Palma de Mallorca, where he finished 18th. He represented the United States in the Chess Olympiads of 1964 and 1966 (team silver medal). His last published FIDE Elo rating was 2490 and his USCF rating was 2595.

From 1965 to 1969 he was director of the Mechanics' Institute Chess Club.

== Notable games ==
- William G Addison vs Donald Byrne (1963) US Championship 1963, King's Indian Defense: Fianchetto Variation. Immediate Fianchetto (E60), 1-0
- William G Addison vs Robert James Fischer (1965) New York ch-US 1965, Nimzo-Indian Defense: Normal. Bronstein (Byrne) Variation (E45), 1/2-1/2
- Robert James Fischer vs William G Addison (1966) New York ch-US 1966, Spanish Game: Open Variations (C80), 1/2-1/2
