= León Schorr =

Venezuelan chess player

Personal information
- Born: 1934 (age 91–92)

Chess career
- Country: Venezuela
- Title: Candidate Master (2014)
- Peak rating: 2215 (July 2001)

León Schorr (born 1934) is a Venezuelan chess master.

He tied for 6-7th at Caracas 1960 (blitz tournament, Antonio Medina won ahead of Bobby Fischer), and won Torneo Día de Galicia in 1961.

Schorr played for Venezuela and won gold medal in the 2nd Central American and Caribbean Team Chess Championship at Caracas 1964, and bronze team medal in the 9th CACAC Team-ch at Guatemala 1971. He also represented Venezuela in Chess Olympiads at Tel Aviv 1964, Havana 1966, Lugano 1968, and Haifa 1976.

In 2001, he played in Boston US-Open.
