= Edwin Bhend =

Swiss chess player and author (1931–2025)

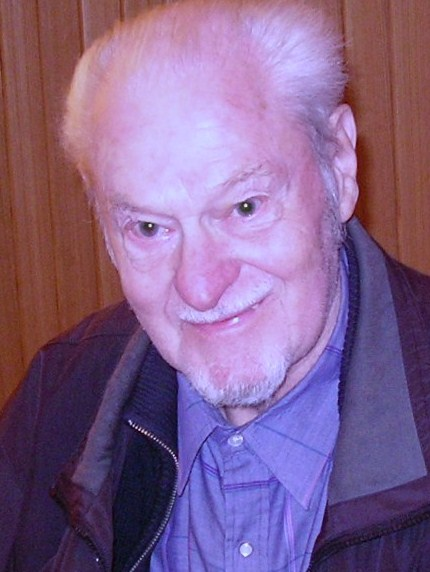
- Bhend in 2012

Personal information
- Born: 9 September 1931
- Died: 20 June 2025 (aged 93)

Chess career
- Country: Switzerland
- Title: FIDE International Master (1960); ICCF Senior International Master (2000)
- Peak rating: 2380 (July 1982)

Edwin Bhend (9 September 1931 – 20 June 2025) was a Swiss chess player and author. He was awarded the International Master title in 1960 and won the Swiss championship in 1966. He represented Switzerland in 10 Chess Olympiads from 1952 to 1982. At Zurich in 1959, he finished in a tie for 10th place behind future world champions Mikhail Tal and Bobby Fischer, but defeated Tal in the opening round after defending accurately in a complicated position. He died on 20 June 2025, at the age of 93.
