= 20th Chess Olympiad =

1972 chess tournament in Skopje, Yugoslavia

Coordinates: 42.003812°N 21.452246°E

Official logo of the Olympiad.

The 20th Chess Olympiad (Macedonian: 20. Шаховска олимпијада, 20. Šahovska olimpijada), organized by FIDE and comprising an open team tournament, as well as several other events designed to promote the game of chess, took place between September 18 and October 13, 1972, in Skopje, Yugoslavia (present-day North Macedonia).

== Summary ==
For the first time, the Soviet team only comprised 5 GMs and one IM (Savon). Since Bobby Fischer had beaten Spassky earlier in the year, the team wasn't led by the current world champion – also a first. It did, however, feature three previous (Smyslov, Tal, and Petrosian) as well as one future champion (Karpov). The team still lived up to expectations, though, and won their eleventh consecutive gold medal, with Hungary and Yugoslavia taking the silver and bronze, respectively.

Before the Soviet team could achieve a victory, there was some controversy. In the 4th round of Final Group A, the Soviets played a match against the team from Bulgaria. A game between Victor Korchnoi and Georgi Tringov was adjourned after 41 moves with Tringov to seal his next move. At this Olympiad, sealed moves were written on a separate piece of paper, not the player's score sheet. Tringov rejected this way of sealing his move and instead wrote it on his score sheet. When the game was resumed, the arbiter opened the envelope. In the envelope was Korchnoi's score sheet but not the one belonging to Tringov. The arbiter ruled the game a forfeit win for Korchnoi. The Bulgarian team captain instituted protest proceedings but an arbitration committee upheld the arbiter's ruling. After the Olympiad was over, it was learned that Tringov had absentmindedly placed his score sheet in his pocket. Tringov discovered his mistake several days after his forfeit but was too ashamed to admit his mistake to the organizers of the Olympiad.

In Final B, the Albanian team refused to play Israel and withdrew after round 11. Their matches were regarded as "friendlies" and didn't count in the overall standings.

Jens Enevoldsen represented Denmark at his 11th and final Olympiad, 39 years after his first appearance at Folkestone 1933. Both records at the time (although both have since been beaten by Lajos Portisch).

The 5th Women's Chess Olympiad also took place; this was the first time that it took place at the same time and in the same venue as the open event. It was won by the Soviet Union team.

== Open event ==
=== Preliminaries ===
A total of 63 teams were divided into eight preliminary groups of seven or eight teams each, from which the top two advanced to Final A, no. 3-4 to Final B etc. Unlike the last few tournaments, preliminary head-to-head results were not carried over to the finals, so each teams met one other team twice. All preliminary groups and finals were played as round-robin tournaments. The results were as follows:

- Group 1:

#	Country	1	2	3	4	5	6	7	+	−	=	Points
A	Soviet Union	-	3½	4	2½	4	4	4	6	0	0	22
A	Denmark	½	-	3	2	2½	3	4	4	1	1	15
B	Belgium	0	1	-	3	3	3½	3½	4	2	0	14
B	Cuba	1½	2	1	-	2½	2½	3½	3	2	1	13
C	Finland	0	1½	1	1½	-	4	3½	2	4	0	11½
C	Dominican Republic	0	1	½	1½	0	-	3	1	5	0	6
D	Luxembourg	0	0	½	½	½	1	-	0	6	0	2½

- Group 2:

#	Country	1	2	3	4	5	6	7	8	+	−	=	Points
A	Yugoslavia	-	2	3½	3	3	4	3	4	6	0	1	22½
A	Switzerland	2	-	2	1½	2½	3½	3½	4	4	1	2	19
B	Peru	½	2	-	2	2½	4	4	4	4	1	2	19
B	England	1	2½	2	-	3	2½	3½	4	5	1	1	18½
C	Brazil	1	1½	1½	1	-	3½	4	3	3	4	0	15½
C	Japan	0	½	0	1½	½	-	2½	3	2	5	0	8
D	Syria	1	½	0	½	0	1½	-	1½	0	7	0	5
D	Cyprus	0	0	0	0	1	1	2½	-	1	6	0	4½

- Group 3:

#	Country	1	2	3	4	5	6	7	8	+	−	=	Points
A	Hungary	-	2	3	3½	3	4	4	4	6	0	1	23½
A	Poland	2	-	2½	3	4	3	4	3½	6	0	1	22
B	Norway	1	1½	-	3½	3	3½	3½	4	5	2	0	20
B	Indonesia	½	1	½	-	3½	3	4	3	4	3	0	15½
C	Scotland	1	0	1	½	-	3½	2½	3	3	4	0	11½
C	Bolivia	0	1	½	1	½	-	2	3	1	5	1	8
D	Morocco	0	0	½	0	1½	2	-	2½	1	5	1	6½
D	Cyprus	0	½	0	1	1	1	1½	-	0	7	0	5

- Group 4:

#	Country	1	2	3	4	5	6	7	8	+	−	=	Points
A	West Germany	-	4	3½	4	3	3½	3	4	7	0	0	25
A	Argentina	0	-	3	2½	2	4	3	4	5	1	1	18½
B	Iceland	½	1	-	2½	3½	3	3½	3½	5	2	0	17½
B	Greece	0	1½	1½	-	3	1½	2½	4	3	4	0	14
C	New Zealand	1	2	½	1	-	2	3	4	2	3	2	13½
C	Mexico	½	0	1	2½	2	-	2	3	2	3	2	11
D	France	1	1	½	1½	1	2	-	3½	1	5	1	10½
D	Guernsey	0	0	½	0	0	1	½	-	0	7	0	2

- Group 5:

#	Country	1	2	3	4	5	6	7	8	+	−	=	Points
A	Czechoslovakia	-	3	3½	3	2	4	4	4	6	0	1	23½
A	Spain	1	-	2½	2½	4	1½	4	4	5	2	0	19½
B	Mongolia	½	1½	-	2	3½	2½	4	3½	4	2	1	17½
B	Israel	1	1½	2	-	2	3	3½	4	3	2	2	17
C	Portugal	2	0	½	2	-	2½	3½	3	3	2	2	13½
C	Ireland	0	2½	1½	1	1½	-	3	3	3	4	0	12½
D	Hong Kong	0	0	0	½	½	1	-	3½	1	6	0	5½
D	Malaysia	0	0	½	0	1	1	½	-	0	7	0	3

- Group 6:

#	Country	1	2	3	4	5	6	7	8	+	−	=	Points
A	East Germany	-	3	2½	3	3½	3½	4	4	7	0	0	23½
A	Sweden	1	-	2½	2	3½	4	3	4	5	1	1	20
B	Canada	1½	1½	-	2½	3½	2½	2½	4	5	2	0	18
B	Italy	1	2	1½	-	2½	2½	4	3½	4	2	1	17
C	Wales	½	½	½	1½	-	2½	3	3	3	4	0	11½
C	Turkey	½	0	1½	1½	1½	-	1½	3½	1	6	0	10
D	Singapore	0	1	1½	0	1	2½	-	3	2	5	0	9
D	Malta	0	0	0	½	1	½	1	-	0	7	0	3

- Group 7:

#	Country	1	2	3	4	5	6	7	8	+	−	=	Points
A	Bulgaria	-	1½	3	2	2½	3½	4	4	5	1	1	20½
A	Netherlands	2½	-	2	2½	3	2	4	4	5	0	2	20
B	Albania	1	2	-	2½	3½	3½	4	3	5	1	1	18
B	Colombia	2	1½	1½	-	2	3½	2½	3	3	2	2	16
C	Australia	1½	1	½	2	-	4	3	4	3	3	1	16
C	Puerto Rico	½	2	½	½	0	-	4	3	2	4	1	10½
D	Iraq	0	0	0	1½	1	0	-	3	1	6	0	5½
D	Andorra	0	0	1	1	0	1	1	-	0	7	0	4

- Group 8:

#	Country	1	2	3	4	5	6	7	8	+	−	=	Points
A	United States	-	2	2	3	3½	3	4	4	5	0	2	21½
A	Romania	2	-	2	2	3	3½	4	4	4	0	3	20½
B	Philippines	2	2	-	2	3½	2	4	4	3	0	4	19½
B	Austria	1	2	2	-	3½	2	2½	3½	3	1	3	16½
C	Tunisia	½	1	½	½	-	4	3	4	3	4	0	13½
C	Iran	1	½	2	2	0	-	4	3½	2	3	2	13
D	Faroe Islands	0	0	0	1½	1	0	-	4	1	6	0	6½
D	United States Virgin Islands	0	0	0	½	0	½	0	-	0	7	0	1

=== Finals ===
Final A
#	Country	Players	Average rating	Points	MP	Head- to-head
1	Soviet Union	Petrosian, Korchnoi, Smyslov, Tal, Karpov, Savon	2635	42		
2	Hungary	Portisch, Bilek, Forintos, Ribli, Csom, Sax	2531	40½		
3	Yugoslavia	Gligorić, Ivkov, Ljubojević, Matanović, Matulović, Rukavina	2543	38		
4	Czechoslovakia	Hort, Smejkal, Filip, Jansa, Přibyl, Trapl	2534	35½		
5	West Germany	Hübner, Darga, Pfleger, Hecht, Kestler, Dueball	2540	35		
6	Bulgaria	Bobotsov, Tringov, Radulov, Padevsky, Peev, Bohosjan	2459	32		
7	Romania	Gheorghiu, Ciocâltea, Ghițescu, Ungureanu, Ghizdavu, Partoș	2466	31½		
8	Netherlands	Donner, Ree, Zuidema, Timman, Hartoch, Enklaar	2465	29	13	2½
9	United States	Kavalek, Byrne, Benko, Bisguier, Martz, Kane	2515	29	13	1½
10	East Germany	Uhlmann, Malich, Knaak, Liebert, Schöneberg, Vogt	2490	27½		
11	Spain	Pomar, Díez del Corral, Medina, Torán, Bellón López, Visier Segovia	2434	26		
12	Poland	Schmidt, Bednarski, Pytel, Sznapik, Filipowicz, Sydor	2410	24½		
13	Denmark	Hamann, Jakobsen, Sloth, Holm, Enevoldsen, Pedersen	2428	23		
14	Argentina	Rossetto, García, Rubinetti, Emma, Debarnot, Hase	2418	22½	9	
15	Sweden	Andersson, Jansson, Ornstein, Liljedahl, Olsson, Uddenfeldt	2399	22½	8	
16	Switzerland	Hug, Lombard, Bhend, Schaufelberger, Wirthensohn, Gereben	2383	21½		

Final B
#	Country	Players	Average rating	Points	MP
17	England	Keene, Hartston, Wade, Markland, Whiteley, Littlewood	2413	37	
18	Israel	Kagan, Kraidman, Geller, Kaldor, Balshan, Friedman	2353	36½	
19	Canada	Suttles, Yanofsky, Vranesic, Biyiasas, Amos, Day	2443	33	
20	Philippines	Torre, Cardoso, Rodríguez, De Castro, Badilles, Lobigas	2365	31½	
21	Norway	Kristiansen, Wibe, Johannessen, Hoen, Øgaard, Zwaig	2404	30½	
22	Cuba	Rodríguez Cordoba, García Martínez, Cobo Arteaga, Hernández, Estévez Morales, Carlos Diaz	2383	30	16
23	Austria	Robatsch, Röhrl, Janetschek, Watzka, Strobel, Holaszek	2360	30	15
24	Iceland	Sigurjónsson, Kristinsson, Torsteinsson, Sólmundarson, Torvaldsson, Magnússon	2419	29	
25	Colombia	Cuéllar, Gutierrez, Cuartas, de Greiff, Minaya Molano, Castro	2361	27	
26	Indonesia	Wotulo, Ardiansyah, Bachtiar, Sampouw, Suradiradja, Turalakey	2318	25½	
27	Italy	Tatai, Mariotti, Paoli, Micheli, Cappello, Capece	2358	25	
28	Mongolia	Üitümen, Myagmarsuren, Tumurbator, Jigjidsuren, Niamdorzi, Zorigt	2330	24½	
29	Greece	Siaperas, Vizantiadis, Skalkotas, Trikaliotis, Makropoulos, Balaskas	2273	21	
30	Belgium	Boey, Van Seters, Cornelis, Beyen, Verstraeten, Wostyn	2298	20½	
31	Peru	Rodríguez Vargas, Quiñones, Vásquez, Pesantes Carbajal, Villasante, García Toledo	2303	19	
-	Albania	Pustina, Vila, Adhami, Muço, Omari, Zadrima	2245	-	

Final C
#	Country	Players	Average rating	Points	MP	Head- to-head
32	Australia	Browne, Fuller, Hay, Flatow, Hamilton, Shaw	2370	45		
33	Finland	Westerinen, Ojanen, Saren, Sorri, Rantanen, Kanko	2288	42½		
34	Scotland	Levy, Pritchett, Bonner, Jamieson, Denman, Aitken	2273	39		
35	Iran	Harandi, Shirazi, Shahsavar, Sharif, Sawadkuhi, Saloor	2250	37½		
36	Brazil	German, Trois, Nóbrega, Toth, van Riemsdijk, dos Santos	2236	25½		
37	Portugal	Ribeiro, Durão, Silva, Santos, Cardoso, Figueiredo	2285	32½		
38	Turkey	Süer, Külür, Onat, Erözbek, Uzman, Bilyap	2261	31		
39	Ireland	Moles, MacGrillen, Littleton, Cassidy, Coldrick, Keeshan M.	2200	28½	15	
40	Puerto Rico	Kaplan, Martínez Buitrago, Berríos Pagán, Benítez, Sacarello, Colón Romero M.	2280	28½	12	
41	Mexico	Campos López, Frey, Escondrillas, De la Cruz, Padilla, Barrientos	2213	26½	12	3
42	Tunisia	Belkadi, Kchouk, Drira, Teboudi K., Najar C., Lagha	2225	26½	12	1
43	Wales	Williams, Hutchings, Gavrilovic, Jones, Haigh, James	2248	26½	10	
44	New Zealand	Sarapu, Sutton, Stuart, Carpinter, Van Dijk, Kerr	2235	25		
45	Dominican Republic	Belliard Alonzo, Delgado, Gonzáles, Peña, Malagón, Álvarez	2200	21½		
46	Bolivia	Martínez Vaca, Chávez Chávez, Alvarez U., Carvajal, Mendivil	2200	19		
47	Japan	Miyasaki, Matsumoto, Gonda, Takahashi, Otami K., Nakamori	2220	15½		

Final D
#	Country	Players	Rating	Points	MP
48	France	Rossolimo, Todorcevic, Letzelter, Huguet, Raizman, Haïk	2276	46½	
49	Singapore	Tan Lian Ann, Lim Kok Ann, Giam Choo Kwee, Choong Liong On, Ee, Pang Kwok Leong	2263	42½	
50	Malta	Camilleri, Gouder, Attard, Saliba, Cilia Vincenti, Casha	2213	32½	
51	Hong Kong	Krstic, Hasan, Kwan Nam Seng, Hobson, Kong V., Krouk	2200	30½	
52	Lebanon	Sursock, Loheac-Ammoun, Maalouf, Bedrossian, Galeb	2200	30	
53	Luxembourg	Philippe, Weber, Stull, Schammo, Simon, Kirsch	2214	29½	
54	Faroe Islands	Petersen, Joensen, Midjord, Mikkelsen, Thomsen, Olsen	2200	29	
55	Syria	Shorbagay, Catalan, Nashed, Asfary, Sayed M., Tabba	2200	28	
56	Cyprus	Kleopas, Constantinou, Avgousti, Martidis, Vassiades, Hadjittofis	2200	27½	
57	Morocco	Belarbi, Kaderi, Abbou, Chami, Sbia, Abdelmalek	2205	26	
58	Andorra	Ballague, Calderon D., De la Casa, Gómez Abad, Pantebre Martínez, Iglesias	2200	24	
59	Malaysia	Foo Lum Choon, Chan Mun Fye, Kao Yin Keat, Fang Ewe Churh, Loh Chee Hoong, Ariff A.	2200	23½	
60	Guernsey	Palmer, Marquand, Bisson, Moriarty, Wallbridge, Gavey	2200	20½	9
61	Iraq	Taha, Al-Hamani, Al-Jassani, Ahmed K., Al-Mawla, Salim	2200	20½	5
62	United States Virgin Islands	Abraham, Grumer E., Potter H., Edwards, Grumer S.	2200	10½	

=== Final A ===
Place	Country	1	2	3	4	5	6	7	8	9	10	11	12	13	14	15	16	+	-	=	Points
1	Soviet Union	-	1½	2½	2	2½	2½	3	2½	3	3½	3½	3	3½	2	3	4	12	1	2	42
2	Hungary	2½	-	2½	2½	2	2½	2½	2½	2½	3½	3½	3	2	4	1½	3½	12	1	2	40½
3	Yugoslavia	1½	1½	-	1½	2	2	2	3	3	2½	3	3	3½	3	2½	4	9	3	3	38
4	Czechoslovakia	2	1½	2½	-	1½	2½	2½	2½	2	1½	1½	2½	3½	2½	4	3	9	4	2	35½
5	West Germany	1½	2	2	2½	-	2½	2½	2½	2½	2½	2½	2	2	3	2	3	9	1	5	35
6	Bulgaria	1½	1½	2	1½	1½	-	2½	3	2½	2½	2	2½	2½	2	2½	2	7	4	4	32
7	Romania	1	1½	2	1½	1½	1½	-	2	2	3	2½	2½	2½	3½	2	2½	6	5	4	31½
8	Netherlands	1½	1½	1	1½	1½	1	2	-	2½	3	3	2	2½	1½	2	2½	5	7	3	29
9	United States	1	1½	1	2	1½	1½	2	1½	-	2½	3	3	1½	2½	2½	2	5	7	3	29
10	East Germany	½	½	1½	2½	1½	1½	1	1	1½	-	2½	2	2	3	4	2½	5	8	2	27½
11	Spain	½	½	1	2½	1½	2	1½	1	1	1½	-	2	3½	3	1½	3	4	9	2	26
12	Poland	1	1	1	1½	2	1½	1½	2	1	2	2	-	2	2	2	2	0	7	8	24½
13	Denmark	½	2	½	½	2	1½	1½	1½	2½	2	½	2	-	2	2½	1½	2	8	5	23
14	Argentina	2	0	1	1½	1	2	½	2½	1½	1	1	2	2	-	2½	2	2	8	5	22½
15	Sweden	1	2½	1½	0	2	1½	2	2	1½	0	2½	2	1½	1½	-	1	2	9	4	22½
16	Switzerland	0	½	0	1	1	2	1½	1½	2	1½	1	2	2½	2	3	-	2	9	4	21½

=== Final B ===
Place	Country	17	18	19	20	21	22	23	24	25	26	27	28	29	30	31	-	+	-	=	Points
17	England	-	2½	2	2½	3	2	2½	3½	2½	3½	3	3	3	1½	2½	2½	11	1	2	37
18	Israel	1½	-	3	1½	3½	2	2½	3	2	3½	2½	3	3½	3	2	4	9	2	3	36½
19	Canada	2	1	-	1	2½	2½	2	2½	2	3	3	2½	2½	4	2½	1½	9	2	3	33
20	Philippines	1½	2½	3	-	1½	2½	½	2	3½	2½	1	2	3	2½	3½		8	4	2	31½
21	Norway	1	½	1½	2½	-	1	1½	3	3	2	2	3½	3	3	32	1	7	5	2	30½
22	Cuba	2	2	1½	1½	3	-	3	1½	2½	2	2½	2	2	2	2½	2½	5	3	6	30
23	Austria	1½	1½	2	3½	2½	1	-	2	2½	2½	1½	1	3½	2	3	3	6	5	3	30
24	Iceland	½	1	1½	2	1	2½	2	-	2	3	2½	2½	2	2½	4	3½	6	4	4	29
25	Colombia	1½	2	2	½	1	1½	1½	2	-	2	3	2	2½	2½	3	2½	4	5	5	27
26	Indonesia	½	½	1	1½	2	2	1½	1	2	-	3½	1½	3	4	1½	2	3	8	3	25½
27	Italy	1	1½	1	3	2	1½	2½	1½	1	½	-	1	2½	2	4	1½	4	8	2	25
28	Mongolia	1	1	1½	2	½	2	3	1½	2	2½	3	-	1	2½	1		4	7	3	24½
29	Greece	1	½	1½	1	1	2	½	2	1½	1	1½	3	-	2½	2		2	9	3	21
30	Belgium	2½	1	0	1½	1	2	2	1½	1½	0	2	1½	1½	-	2½	1	2	9	3	20½
31	Peru	1½	2	1½	½	1	1½	1	0	1	2½	0	3	2	1½	-		2	10	2	19
-	Albania	1½	0	2½		3	1½	1	½	1½	2	2½			3		-	-	-	-	-

- Team Albania refused to play Israel and withdrew after round 11. Their scores were set as friendlies.

=== Final C ===
Place	Country	32	33	34	35	36	37	38	39	40	41	42	43	44	45	46	47	+	-	=	Points
32	Australia	-	3	2	3	2	3½	3½	3	3	4	3	2½	3	3	2½	4	13	0	2	45
33	Finland	1	-	3	2	2	3½	2½	3	2	3½	2½	3½	2½	3	4	4	11	1	3	42
34	Scotland	2	1	-	2	2½	2½	2½	1½	3	2½	2	2½	3½	3½	4	4	10	2	3	39
35	Iran	1	2	2	-	3½	3	1	1½	2½	3	3	3	3	3½	3	2½	10	3	2	37½
36	Brazil	2	2	1½	½	-	1½	2	2½	3	2½	2	2	3½	3	4	3½	7	3	5	35½
37	Portugal	½	½	1½	1	2½	-	1½	3½	2	2½	2	2½	2	4	3	3½	7	5	3	32½
38	Turkey	½	1½	1½	3	2	2½	-	1½	3½	4	1	2	1½	2	2	2½	5	6	4	31
39	Ireland	1	1	2½	2½	1½	½	2½	-	2½	1	2	2	2	1½	3½	2½	6	6	3	28½
40	Puerto Rico	1	2	1	1½	1	2	½	1½	-	2½	4	2½	2	3½	2	1½	4	7	4	28½
41	Mexico	0	½	1½	1	1½	1½	0	3	1½	-	3	3	2	3	2	3	5	8	2	26½
42	Tunisia	1	1½	2	1	2	2	3	2	0	1	-	2	1½	2	2½	3	3	6	6	26½
43	Wales	1½	½	1½	1	2	1½	2	2	1½	1	2	-	2	2½	2	3½	2	7	6	26½
44	New Zealand	1	1½	½	1	½	2	2½	2	2	2	2½	2	-	1	2	2½	3	6	6	25
45	Dominican Republic	1	1	½	½	1	0	2	2½	½	1	2	1½	3	-	2½	2½	4	9	2	21½
46	Bolivia	1½	0	0	1	0	1	2	½	2	2	1½	2	2	1½	-	2	0	9	6	19
47	Japan	0	0	0	1½	½	½	1½	1½	2½	1	1	½	1½	1½	2	-	1	13	1	15½

=== Final D ===
Place	Country	48	49	50	51	52	53	54	55	56	57	58	59	60	61	62	+	-	=	Points
48	France	-	2	3	4	3	4	1½	2½	3½	3	4	4	4	4	4	12	1	1	46½
49	Singapore	2	-	3½	3	3½	3	2½	3½	2½	3	3½	2½	4	3	3	13	0	1	42½
50	Malta	1	½	-	2½	3	1	3½	2½	2	2½	2½	2	3½	3	2½	9	3	2	32
51	Hong Kong	0	1	1½	-	1½	2½	3½	1½	2	2½	3	3	3½	2½	2½	8	5	1	30½
52	Lebanon	1	½	1	2½	-	2	2½	2½	2	2	2	3	2½	3	3½	7	3	4	30
53	Luxembourg	0	1	3	1½	2	-	2	3	2½	3½	2	3	½	2½	3	7	4	3	29½
54	Faroe Islands	2½	1½	½	½	1½	2	-	1½	3½	2½	2½	2½	2	2½	3½	7	5	2	29
55	Syria	1½	½	1½	2½	1½	1	2½	-	2	1	1½	2½	3½	3½	3	6	7	1	28
56	Cyprus	½	1½	2	2	2	1½	½	2½	-	2½	2	2½	3	2½	3	5	4	5	27½
57	Morocco	1	1	1½	1½	2	½	1½	3	1½	-	2½	2½	1½	2	4	4	8	2	26
58	Andorra	0	½	1½	1	2	2	1½	2½	2	1½	-	2½	1	2½	3½	4	7	3	24
59	Malaysia	0	1½	2	1	1	1	1½	1½	1½	1½	1½	-	2½	2½	4	3	10	1	23
60	Guernsey	0	0	½	½	1½	3½	2	½	1	2½	3	1½	-	1½	2½	4	9	1	20½
61	Iraq	0	1	1	1½	1	1½	1½	½	1½	2	1½	1½	2½	-	3½	2	11	1	20½
62	United States Virgin Islands	0	1	1½	1½	½	1	½	1	1	0	½	0	1½	½	-	0	14	0	10½

=== Individual medals ===
- Board 1: (West Germany) Robert Hübner 15 / 18 = 83.3%
- Board 2: (Soviet Union) Viktor Korchnoi 11 / 15 = 73.3%
- Board 3: (Socialist Federal Republic of Yugoslavia) Ljubomir Ljubojević 15½ / 19 = 81.6%
- Board 4: (Soviet Union) Mikhail Tal 14 / 16 = 87.5%
- 1st reserve: (Soviet Union) Anatoly Karpov 13 / 15 = 86.7%
- 2nd reserve: (France) Aldo Haïk 11 / 12 = 91.7%

=== Best game ===
The Best Game prize went to Werner Hug (Switzerland) - Vlastimil Hort (Czechoslovakia) from Final A.

== Women's event ==
Twenty-three nations took part in the women's Olympiad. From four preliminary groups the teams were split into three finals. The Soviet Union won.

=== Preliminaries ===
- Group 1:

Final	Country	1	2	3	4	5	+	−	=	Points
A	Soviet Union	-	2	2	2	1½	4	0	0	7½
A	East Germany	0	-	1½	1½	2	3	1	0	5
B	Netherlands	0	½	-	1½	2	2	2	0	4
B	Australia	0	½	½	-	2	1	3	0	3
C	Ireland	½	0	0	0	-	0	4	0	½

- Group 2:

Final	Country	1	2	3	4	5	6	+	−	=	Points
A	England	-	1	1½	2	2	2	4	0	1	8½
A	Czechoslovakia	1	-	1	2	2	2	3	0	2	8
B	Yugoslavia	½	1	-	2	2	2	3	1	1	7½
B	Austria	0	0	0	-	1½	2	2	3	0	3½
C	Scotland	0	0	0	½	-	1½	1	4	0	2
C	Japan	0	0	0	0	½	-	0	5	0	½

- Group 3:

Final	Country	1	2	3	4	5	6	+	−	=	Points
A	Romania	-	1	2	2	1½	1½	4	0	1	8
A	Bulgaria	1	-	1½	1½	2	2	4	0	1	8
B	Mongolia	0	½	-	1	1	2	1	2	2	4½
B	Brazil	0	½	1	-	1½	1	1	2	2	4
C	Israel	½	0	1	½	-	1	0	3	2	3
C	Switzerland	½	0	0	1	1	-	0	3	2	2½

- Group 4:

Final	Country	1	2	3	4	5	6	+	−	=	Points
A	Hungary	-	1	1	2	2	2	3	0	2	8
A	West Germany	1	-	1	2	1½	2	3	0	2	7½
B	Poland	1	1	-	1	2	2	2	0	3	7
B	Sweden	0	0	1	-	1	2	1	2	2	4
C	Finland	0	½	0	1	-	1	0	3	2	2½
C	Singapore	0	0	0	0	1	-	0	4	1	1

=== Finals ===
Final A
#	Country	Players	Average rating	Points	MP
1	Soviet Union	Nona Gaprindashvili, Alla Kushnir, Irina Levitina	2373	11½	
2	Romania	Elisabeta Polihroniade, Gertrude Baumstark, Alexandra Nicolau	2258	8	8
3	Hungary	Mária Ivánka, Zsuzsa Verőci, Gyuláné Krizsán-Bilek	2233	8	8
4	Bulgaria	Tatjana Lematschko, Antonina Georgieva, Vesmina Shikova	2130	7½	
5	Czechoslovakia	Stepanka Vokřálová, Květa Eretová, Eva Hojdarová	2168	7	
6	West Germany	Anni Laakmann, Irmgard Kärner, Ursula Wasnetsky	1885	5½	
7	East Germany	Waltraud Nowarra, Gabriele Just, Christina Hölzlein	2148	4½	
8	England	Jana Hartston, Elaine Pritchard, Anne Sunnucks	2005	4	

Final B
#	Country	Players	Average rating	Points	MP
9	Poland	Krystyna Radzikowska, Hanna Ereńska-Radzewska, Mirosława Litmanowicz	2138	10½	
10	Yugoslavia	Milunka Lazarević, Katarina Jovanović, Henrijeta Konarkowska-Sokolov	2273	8½	
11	Austria	Ingeborg Kattinger, Alfreda Hausner, Wilma Samt	1800	7	7
12	Netherlands	Hendrika Timmer, Ingrid Jansen, Ada van der Giessen	2035	7	7
13	Sweden	Solveig Haraldsson, Ingrid Keményová-Svensson, Ulla Bohmgren	1848	6½	
14	Brazil	Ruth Cardoso, Regina Fontanelli, Ivone Moysés	1905	6	
15	Mongolia	Ganginchugin Hulgana, Sandagdorj Handsuren, Biamba	1800	5½	
16	Australia	Narelle Kellner, Marion McGrath, Lynda Maddern	1800	5	

Final C
#	Country	Players	Points	MP
17	Switzerland	Anna Näpfer, Elsa Lüssy, Fässler J.	9	
18	Israel	Frida Rabinovich, Lidia Gal, Klugas S.	8½	
19	Singapore	Mok Poh Pheng, Giam Yoke Chin, Jane Tan	6	
20	Ireland	Dorren O'Siochrú, Aileen Noonan, Ann O'Clery	5½	5
21	Finland	Sirkka-Liisa Vuorenpää, Johanna Tuomainen, Marjatta Palasto	5½	4
22	Scotland	Nancy Elder, Mary McGinn, Miriam Little	4½	
23	Japan	Miyoko Watai, Otani K., Kyoto Watanabe	3	

=== Final A ===
#	Country	1	2	3	4	5	6	7	8	+	−	=	Points
1	Soviet Union	-	2	1½	1½	1	2	1½	2	6	0	1	11½
2	Romania	0	-	2	1	1	2	1	1	2	1	4	8
3	Hungary	½	0	-	1	1½	1	2	2	3	2	2	8
4	Bulgaria	½	1	1	-	1	½	2	1½	2	2	3	7½
5	Czechoslovakia	1	1	½	1	-	1	1	1½	1	1	5	7
6	West Germany	0	0	1	1½	1	-	½	1½	2	3	2	5½
7	East Germany	½	1	0	0	1	1½	-	½	1	4	2	4½
8	England	0	1	0	½	½	½	1½	-	1	5	1	4

=== Final B ===
#	Country	9	10	11	12	13	14	15	16	+	−	=	Points
9	Poland	-	1½	1½	2	1	1½	1½	1½	6	0	1	10½
10	Yugoslavia	½	-	1	½	1½	2	1½	1½	4	2	1	8½
11	Austria	½	1	-	1½	2	1	0	1	2	2	3	7
12	Netherlands	0	1½	½	-	1	1	2	1	2	2	3	7
13	Sweden	1	½	0	1	-	1	1	2	1	2	4	6½
14	Brazil	½	0	1	1	1	-	1½	1	1	2	4	6
15	Mongolia	½	½	2	0	1	½	-	1	1	4	2	5½
16	Australia	½	½	1	1	0	1	1	-	0	3	4	5

=== Final C ===
#	Country	17	18	19	20	21	22	23	+	−	=	Points
17	Switzerland	-	1	2	1½	2	½	2	4	1	1	9
18	Israel	1	-	1	1½	1½	1½	2	4	0	2	8½
19	Singapore	0	1	-	1	1½	1½	1	2	3	1	6
20	Ireland	½	½	1	-	1½	1½	½	2	3	1	5½
21	Finland	0	½	½	½	-	2	2	2	4	0	5½
22	Scotland	1½	½	½	½	0	-	1½	2	4	0	4½
23	Japan	0	0	1	1½	0	½	-	1	4	1	3

=== Individual medals ===
- Board 1: (Soviet Union) Nona Gaprindashvili 6½ / 8 = 81.3%
- Board 2: (Soviet Union) Alla Kushnir 7 / 8 = 87.5%
- Reserve: (Socialist Federal Republic of Yugoslavia) Henrijeta Konarkowska-Sokolov 6½ / 9 = 72.2%
