= Baku 1980 (chess tournament) =

Chess event in Azerbaijan, USSR

Baku 1980 was an international chess tournament held in Baku, Azerbaijan from March 29 to April 18, 1980. The participants were Garry Kasparov (2595), Alexander Beliavsky (2590), Eugenio Torre (2520), Istvan Csom (2510), Eduard Gufeld (2510), Lothar Vogt (2510), Adrian Mikhalchishin (2490), Igor Zaitsev (2490), Vladimir Antoshin (2480), Karen Grigorian (2475), Slobodan Martinovic (2475), Silvino García Martínez (2450), Jiří Lechtýnský (2450), Elmar Magerramov (2435), Nikola Padevsky (2415), and Maia Chiburdanidze (2400).

== Table ==
No.	Participant	Country	1	2	3	4	5	6	7	8	9	10	11	12	13	14	15	16	+	−	=	Score	Place
1	Garry Kasparov	Soviet Union	style="color: red"	½	1	½	½	1	1	1	½	½	½	1	1	½	1	1	8	0	7	11½	1
2	Alexander Beliavsky	Soviet Union	½	style="color: red"	1	½	½	½	½	½	1	1	1	½	½	1	1	1	7	0	8	11	2
3	Karen Grigorian	Soviet Union	0	0	style="color: red"	½	½	1	½	½	½	1	½	½	½	½	1	1	4	2	9	8½	3—5
4	Eduard Gufeld	Soviet Union	½	½	½	style="color: red"	½	1	½	½	½	½	½	½	½	1	½	½	2	0	13	8½	3—5
5	Adrian Mikhalchishin	Soviet Union	½	½	½	½	style="color: red"	½	½	½	1	½	½	½	½	0	1	1	3	1	11	8½	3—5
6	Eugenio Torre	Philippines	0	½	0	0	½	style="color: red"	1	1	0	½	½	1	1	1	0	1	6	5	4	8	6—8
7	Maia Chiburdanidze	Soviet Union	0	½	½	½	½	0	style="color: red"	0	1	½	½	1	½	½	1	1	4	3	8	8	6—8
8	István Csom	Hungary Hungary	0	½	½	½	½	0	1	style="color: red"	½	1	½	½	1	½	½	½	3	2	10	8	6—8
9	Jiří Lechtýnský	Czechoslovakia	½	0	½	½	0	1	0	½	style="color: red"	½	½	½	½	½	1	1	3	3	9	7½	9—10
10	Elmar Magerramov	Soviet Union	½	0	0	½	½	½	½	0	½	style="color: red"	½	½	1	½	1	1	3	3	9	7½	9—10
11	Nikola Padevsky	Bulgaria	½	0	½	½	½	½	½	½	½	½	style="color: red"	0	½	1	½	½	1	2	12	7	11
12	Vladimir Antoshin	Soviet Union	0	½	½	½	½	0	0	½	½	½	1	style="color: red"	½	½	1	0	2	4	9	6½	12
13	Igor Zaitsev	Soviet Union	0	½	½	½	½	0	½	0	½	0	½	½	style="color: red"	½	1	½	1	4	10	6	13—14
14	Lothar Vogt	East Germany	½	0	½	0	1	0	½	½	½	½	0	½	½	style="color: red"	½	½	1	4	10	6	13—14
15	Slobodan Martinović	Yugoslavia	0	0	0	½	0	1	0	½	0	0	½	0	0	½	style="color: red"	1	2	9	4	4	15
16	Silvino García Martínez	Cuba	0	0	0	½	0	0	0	½	0	0	½	1	½	½	0	style="color: red"	1	9	5	3½	16

== Sources ==
- Шахматный бюллетень, 1980 No.7, С. 215—218
- "Baku". 365chess.com. Archived from the original on 22 September 2020.
