= 18th Chess Olympiad =

1968 chess tournament in Lugano, Switzerland

The official poster for the Olympiad.

The 18th Chess Olympiad (Italian: Le 18º Olimpiadi degli scacchi), organized by FIDE and comprising an open team tournament, as well as several other events designed to promote the game of chess, took place between October 17 and November 7, 1968, in Lugano, Switzerland.

The Soviet team with six GMs, led by world champion Petrosian, lived up to expectations and won their ninth consecutive gold medals, with Yugoslavia and Bulgaria taking the silver and bronze, respectively.

== Results ==
=== Preliminaries ===
A total of 53 teams entered the competition and were divided into seven preliminary groups of seven or eight teams each. The top two from each group advanced to Final A, the teams placed third-fourth to Final B, no. 5-6 to Final C, and the rest to Final D. Preliminary head-to-head results were carried over to the finals, so no teams met more than once. All preliminary groups and finals were played as round-robin tournaments. The results were as follows:

- Group 1:

No.	Country	1	2	3	4	5	6	7	8	+	−	=	Points
«A»	Soviet Union	-	4	3½	4	3½	4	4	4	7	0	0	27
«A»	Philippines	0	-	2½	1½	3½	3½	4	4	5	2	0	19
«B»	England	½	1½	-	2	3½	3½	4	4	4	2	1	19
«B»	Israel	0	2½	2	-	3	3	4	4	5	1	1	18½
«C»	Italy	½	½	½	1	-	2	3	3	2	4	1	10½
«C»	Portugal	0	½	½	1	2	-	3	3	2	4	1	10
«D»	Mexico	0	0	0	0	1	1	-	2½	1	6	0	4½
«D»	Cyprus	0	0	0	0	1	1	1½	-	0	7	0	3½

- Group 2:

No.	Country	1	2	3	4	5	6	7	+	−	=	Points
«A»	Denmark	-	2½	2	2½	2½	3½	3½	5	0	1	16½
«A»	United States	1½	-	2½	2½	3½	3½	3	5	1	0	16½
«B»	Mongolia	2	1½	-	1	3½	2½	2½	3	2	1	13
«B»	Austria	1½	1½	3	-	1½	2½	2	2	3	1	12
«C»	Australia	1½	½	½	2½	-	1½	3	2	4	0	9½
«C»	Venezuela	½	½	1½	1½	2½	-	2½	2	4	0	9
«D»	France	½	1	1½	2	1	1½	-	0	5	1	7½

- Group 3:

No.	Country	1	2	3	4	5	6	7	+	−	=	Points
«A»	Yugoslavia	-	2½	3	2½	4	3½	4	6	0	0	19½
«A»	Poland	1½	-	2½	3½	3½	3½	4	5	1	0	18½
«B»	Spain	1	1½	-	2½	4	4	4	4	2	0	17
«B»	Scotland	1½	½	1½	-	2	3	4	2	3	1	12½
«C»	South Africa	0	½	0	2	-	2½	3½	2	3	1	8½
«C»	Luxembourg	½	½	0	1	1½	-	1	0	6	0	4½
«D»	Dominican Republic	0	0	0	0	½	3	-	1	5	0	3½

- Group 4:

No.	Country	1	2	3	4	5	6	7	8	+	−	=	Points
«A»	Hungary	-	3	2½	3	3½	3½	3½	3½	7	0	0	22½
«A»	Canada	1	-	2½	2½	3½	3	3	4	6	1	0	19½
«B»	Netherlands	1½	1½	-	3½	2½	4	2½	4	5	2	0	19½
«B»	Belgium	1	1½	½	-	2½	3	3	4	4	3	0	15½
«C»	Monaco	½	½	1½	1½	-	1	3	3	2	5	0	11
«C»	Ireland	½	1	0	1	3	-	2	2½	2	4	1	10
«D»	Paraguay	½	1	1½	1	1	2	-	3	1	5	1	10
«D»	Costa Rica	½	0	0	0	1	1½	1	-	0	7	0	4

- Group 5:

No.	Country	1	2	3	4	5	6	7	8	+	−	=	Points
«A»	West Germany	-	2	3½	2½	2½	3½	4	4	6	0	1	22
«A»	Romania	2	-	3	2½	2½	2½	3½	4	6	0	1	20
«B»	Switzerland	½	1	-	3	3	3	3½	4	5	2	0	18
«B»	Brazil	1½	1½	1	-	2	3½	3½	4	3	3	1	17
«C»	Norway	1½	1½	1	2	-	2	3	4	2	3	2	15
«C»	Puerto Rico	½	1½	1	½	2	-	3	2½	2	4	1	11
«D»	Hong Kong	0	½	½	½	1	1	-	3	1	6	0	6½
«D»	Lebanon	0	0	0	0	0	1½	1	-	0	7	0	2½

- Group 6:

No.	Country	1	2	3	4	5	6	7	+	−	=	Points
«A»	Argentina	-	2½	2½	3	3½	4	4	6	0	0	19½
«A»	East Germany	1½	-	3	3½	4	3½	4	5	1	0	19½
«B»	Finland	1½	1	-	2½	2	3	3½	3	2	1	13½
«B»	Sweden	1	½	1½	-	3	2½	3	3	3	0	11½
«C»	Greece	½	0	2	1	-	4	3	2	3	1	10½
«C»	Morocco	0	½	1	1½	0	-	2	0	5	1	5
«D»	United States Virgin Islands	0	0	½	1	1	2	-	0	5	1	4½

- Group 7:

No.	Country	1	2	3	4	5	6	7	8	+	−	=	Points
«A»	Bulgaria	-	2½	3	2½	2½	4	4	4	7	0	0	22½
«A»	Czechoslovakia	1½	-	2	2½	4	4	4	4	5	1	1	22
«B»	Iceland	1	2	-	3½	2	3	4	4	4	1	2	19½
«B»	Cuba	1½	1½	½	-	2½	3½	3½	4	4	3	0	17
«C»	Tunisia	1½	0	2	1½	-	1½	2½	4	2	4	1	13
«C»	Turkey	0	0	1	½	2½	-	2½	4	3	4	0	10½
«D»	Singapore	0	0	0	½	1½	1½	-	4	1	6	0	7½
«D»	Andorra	0	0	0	0	0	0	0	-	0	7	0	0

=== Final ===
Final A
#	Country	Players	Points	MP
1	Soviet Union	Petrosian, Spassky, Korchnoi, Geller, Polugaevsky, Smyslov	39½	
2	Yugoslavia	Gligorić, Ivkov, Matanović, Matulović, Parma, Čirić	31	
3	Bulgaria	Bobotsov, Tringov, Padevsky, Kolarov, Radulov, Peev	30	
4	United States	Reshevsky, Evans, Benko, R. Byrne, Lombardy, D. Byrne	29½	
5	West Germany	Unzicker, Schmid, Darga, Pfleger, Hübner, Hecht	29	
6	Hungary	Portisch, Szabó, Bilek, Lengyel, Barcza, Csom	27½	
7	Argentina	Najdorf, Panno, Sanguineti, Rossetto, Rubinetti, García	26	15
8	Romania	Gheorghiu, Ciocâltea, Ghițescu, Drimer, Soós, Ungureanu	26	14
9	Czechoslovakia	Hort, Filip, Smejkal, Jansa, Augustin, Janata	24½	12
10	East Germany	Uhlmann, Pietzsch, Zinn, Malich, Liebert, Hennings	24½	11
11	Poland	Kostro, Bednarski, Doda, Schmidt, Adamski, Grąbczewski	23	
12	Denmark	Larsen, Brinck-Claussen, Hamann, Holm, Petersen, Nørby	21	
13	Canada	Yanofsky, Suttles, Macskasy, Allan, Day, Schulman	19	
14	Philippines	Reyes, Balinas, De Castro, Naranja, Bandal, Rodríguez	13½	

Final B
#	Country	Players	Points	MP
15	Netherlands	Donner, Ree, Langeweg, Bouwmeester, Kuijpers, Prins	33½	
16	England	Penrose, Kottnauer, Clarke, Keene, Lee, Basman	33	
17	Austria	Dückstein, Prameshuber, Stoppel, Janetschek, Kinzel, Niedermayr	30½	
18	Israel	Czerniak, Porat, Kraidman, Kagan, Domnitz, Peretz	30	
19	Spain	Pomar, Medina, Torán, Visier, Calvo, Palacios de la Prida	28½	
20	Cuba	Jiménez, García Martínez, Cobo, Rodríguez Gonzáles, Ortega, Carlos Diaz	27	14
21	Switzerland	Keller, Kupper, Blau, Bhend, Walther, Glauser	27	12
22	Iceland	Jóhannsson, Sigurjónsson, Kristjánsson, Kristinsson, Thorsteinsson, Ásmundsson	26	
23	Finland	Westerinen, Ojanen, Havansi, Koskinen, Kajan, Venäläinen	24½	
24	Sweden	Jansson, Nilsson, Johansson, Broström, Olsson, Sköld	22½	
25	Brazil	Mecking, German, Câmara, Rocha, Miranda, Pinto Paiva	21½	
26	Belgium	O'Kelly, Boey, Rooze, Cornelis, Beyen, Dunkelblum	20½	
27	Mongolia	Üitümen, Myagmarsuren, Lhagva, Zorigt, Badamgarav G., Purevzhav	20	
28	Scotland	Fairhurst, Davie, McAlpine, Levy, Freeman, McKay	19½	

Final C
#	Country	Players	Points	MP
29	Australia	Hamilton, Fuller, Koshnitsky, Flatow, Viner, Shaw	38	
30	Norway	Johannessen, Hoen, Svedenborg, Zwaig, Wibe, de Lange	36	
31	Italy	Giustolisi, Cappello, Zichichi, Primavera, Magrin, Romani	31½	
32	Venezuela	Caro, Villarroel, Budowski, Schorr, Diaz, Robles	30	
33	Turkey	Süer, İbrahimoğlu, Uzman, Boysan, Bilyap, Külür	29½	
34	Greece	Vizantiadis, Siaperas, Trikaliotis, Ornithopoulos, Kokkoris, Rizopoulos	28½	
35	Portugal	Cordovil, Sardinha, Durão, Santos, Pereira	27½	16
36	South Africa	Friedgood, Kroon, Heyns, Morschel, Griffiths, Hangelbroek	27½	14
37	Tunisia	Belkadi, Bouaziz, Kchouk, Lagha, Ben Rehouma, Hentati	26	
38	Ireland	Heidenfeld, Littleton, Reilly, O'Riordan, McCurdy, De Loughrey	21	
39	Luxembourg	Feller, Philippe, Wantz, Dietrich, Schammo, Stull	20½	
40	Puerto Rico	Kaplan, Buitrago, Colón Romero A., Reissmann, Sacarello, Benítez	19½	
41	Morocco	Bakali, Hadri, Kaderi, Nejjar, Soussi, Benabud	16	
42	Monaco	Casa, Weiss, Donné, Kostjoerin, Kann, Muziole	12½	

Final D
#	Country	Players	Points	MP
43	Singapore	Tan, Ann, Seng, Kwee, Seng, On	32	
44	France	Boutteville, Letzelter, Huguet, Jean, Thiellement, Ferry	30	
45	Paraguay	Silva, Recalde, Prieto, Gonzáles, Cantero, Levy	27½	
46	Mexico	Castro Aguilar, Winter Gallegos, Delgado, Flores Soto, Araiza, Terrazas	23½	13
47	Dominican Republic	Myers, Malagón A., Malagón C., Belliard Alonzo, Yabra, Andujar	23½	12
48	Hong Kong	Kazanski, Gibbs, Hardt, Hobson, Badilles	22½	
49	Costa Rica	Rovira Mas, Van der Laat Ulloa, Wyss, Rojas, Quesada, Batres	14½	
50	Lebanon	Salameh, Bedrossian, Galeb, Rizk, Cabbouche	13½	
51	Cyprus	Constantinou, Kleopas, Avgousti, Lantsias, Cababe	13	
52	United States Virgin Islands	Hook, Hoyt, Roebuck, Edwards, Potter, Garrison	11	
53	Andorra	Jiménez, De la Casa, Corominas, Gómez Abad, Soler, Pantebre Martínez	9	

=== Final «A» ===
- Matches played in semi-finals are italicized.

No.	Country	1	2	3	4	5	6	7	8	9	10	11	12	13	14	+	−	=	Points
1	Soviet Union	-	2½	3	3½	2	3	2½	3	3	3	4	4	2	4	11	0	2	39½
2	Yugoslavia	1½	-	1½	2	2	2½	1½	2½	2½	3	2½	3	2½	4	8	3	2	31
3	Bulgaria	1	2½	-	2	2	2½	1½	3½	2½	2½	2½	2	2	3½	7	2	4	30
4	United States	½	2	2	-	2½	2½	3	2½	2½	1½	3	1½	4	2	7	3	3	29½
5	Germany	2	2	2	1½	-	2½	3½	2	1½	2	2	2	2½	3½	4	2	7	29
6	Hungary	1	1½	1½	1½	1½	-	2½	2½	2	2	3	3	3	2½	6	5	2	27½
7	Argentina	1½	2½	2½	1	½	1½	-	2	2	2½	2	2½	3	2½	6	4	3	26
8	Romania	1	1½	½	1½	2	1½	2	-	2½	2½	2½	3	3	2½	6	5	2	26
9	Czechoslovakia	1	1½	1½	1½	2½	2	2	1½	-	2½	½	3	2½	2½	5	6	2	24½
10	East Germany	1	1	1½	2½	2	2	1½	1½	1½	-	2	2½	2½	3	4	6	3	24½
11	Poland	0	1½	1½	1	2	1	2	1½	3½	2	-	1½	3	2½	3	7	3	23
12	Denmark	0	1	2	2½	2	1	1½	1	1	1½	2½	-	2½	2½	4	7	2	21
13	Canada	2	1½	2	0	1½	1	1	1	1½	1½	1	1½	-	3½	1	10	2	19
14	Philippines	0	0	½	2	½	1½	1½	1½	1½	1	1½	1½	½	-	0	12	1	13½

=== Final «B» ===
- Matches played in semi-finals are italicized.

No.	Country	15	16	17	18	19	20	21	22	23	24	25	26	27	28	+	−	=	Points
15	Netherlands	-	3	2½	2	2	1½	2	2½	3½	2½	3½	3½	2½	2½	9	1	3	33½
16	England	1	-	2	2	2½	3½	1½	2½	2½	3	3	3	3½	3	9	2	2	33
17	Austria	1½	2	-	½	3	2	3	3	2½	2	3	2	3	3	7	2	4	30½
18	Israel	2	2	3½	-	2	2½	2	2	2½	2	2	2	2½	3	5	0	8	30
19	Spain	2	1½	1	2	-	2	2½	3	2	2½	1½	3	3	2½	6	3	4	28½
20	Cuba	2½	½	2	1½	2	-	1	½	2	3½	3½	3	2	3	5	4	4	27
21	Switzerland	2	2½	1	2	1½	3	-	1½	1½	1	3	2	4	2	4	5	4	27
22	Iceland	1½	1½	1	2	1	3½	2½	-	1½	2	2	3	2½	2	4	5	4	26
23	Finland	½	1½	1½	1½	2	2	2½	2½	-	2½	2	1½	1	3½	4	6	3	24½
24	Sweden	1½	1	2	2	1½	½	3	2	1½	-	1	1½	3	2	2	7	4	22½
25	Brazil	½	1	1	2	2½	½	1	2	2	3	-	2½	1½	2	3	6	4	21½
26	Belgium	½	1	2	2	1	1	2	1	2½	2½	1½	-	1	2½	3	7	3	20½
27	Mongolia	1½	½	1	1½	1	2	0	1½	3	1	2½	3	-	1½	3	9	1	20
28	Scotland	1½	1	1	1	1½	1	2	2	½	2	2	1½	2½	-	1	8	4	19½

=== Final «C» ===
- Matches played in semi-finals are italicized.

No.	Country	29	30	31	32	33	34	35	36	37	38	39	40	41	42	+	−	=	Points
29	Australia	-	3	2	1½	1½	3½	3½	2½	3	3½	3½	4	3	3½	10	2	1	38
30	Norway	1	-	2	2	2	3	4	4	1	3	4	2	4	4	7	2	4	36
31	Italy	2	2	-	1½	2½	3	2	2½	3	2½	2	1½	4	3	7	2	4	31½
32	Venezuela	2½	2	2½	-	2½	1½	1	1	2	4	3	2	3	3	7	3	3	30
33	Turkey	2½	2	1½	1½	-	2	1½	2	2½	1	2½	3½	3½	3½	6	4	3	29½
34	Greece	½	1	1	2½	2	-	1	3½	1½	3	2½	3	4	3	7	5	1	28½
35	Portugal	½	0	2	3	2½	3	-	1	1½	2½	2	3	3	3½	7	4	2	27½
36	South Africa	1½	0	1½	3	2	½	3	-	4	2	2½	3	1	3½	6	5	2	27½
37	Tunisia	1	3	1	2	1½	2½	2½	0	-	3	2½	2	2½	2½	7	4	2	26
38	Ireland	½	1	1½	0	3	1	1½	2	1	-	2	2	2½	3	3	7	3	21
39	Luxembourg	½	0	2	1	1½	1½	2	1½	1½	2	-	2½	2	2½	2	7	4	20½
40	Puerto Rico	0	2	2½	2	½	1	1	1	2	2	1½	-	2	2	1	6	6	19½
41	Morocco	1	0	0	1	½	0	1	3	1½	1½	2	2	-	2½	2	9	2	16
42	Monaco	½	0	1	1	½	1	½	½	1½	1	1½	2	1½	-	0	12	1	12½

=== Final «D» ===
- Matches played in semi-finals are italicized.

No.	Country	43	44	45	46	47	48	49	50	51	52	53	+	−	=	Points
43	Singapore	-	1½	2	3	4	2½	4	4	3	4	4	8	1	1	32
44	France	2½	-	1½	1½	3	3½	3½	3½	3	4	4	8	2	0	30
45	Paraguay	2	2½	-	2½	1½	2	3	3½	3	4	3½	7	1	2	27½
46	Mexico	1	2½	1½	-	2½	1½	2	3½	2½	3	3½	6	3	1	23½
47	Dominican Republic	0	1	2½	1½	-	3	3	1½	3½	3½	4	6	4	0	23½
48	Hong Kong	1½	½	2	2½	1	-	3½	3	2½	2	4	5	3	2	22½
49	Costa Rica	0	½	1	2	1	½	-	2½	2	3	2	2	5	3	14½
50	Lebanon	0	½	½	½	2½	1	1½	-	2½	3	1½	3	7	0	13½
51	Cyprus	1	1	1	1½	½	1½	2	1½	-	½	2½	1	8	1	13
52	United States Virgin Islands	0	0	0	1	½	2	1	1	3½	-	2	1	7	2	11
53	Andorra	0	0	½	½	0	0	2	2½	1½	2	-	1	7	2	9

=== Individual medals ===
- Board 1: (Soviet Union) Tigran Petrosian 10½ / 12 = 87.5%
- Board 2: (Bulgaria) Georgi Tringov 11 / 14 = 78.6%
- Board 3: (Soviet Union) Viktor Korchnoi 11 / 13 = 84.6%
- Board 4: (Israel) Shimon Kagan 10½ / 13 = 80.8%
- 1st reserve: (Hong Kong) Glicerio Badilles 11½ / 14 = 82.1%
- 2nd reserve: (Soviet Union) Vassily Smyslov 11 / 12 = 91.7%
