= Battsetseg =

Battsetseg (spelt Батцэцэг in Mongolian Cyrillic) is a female Mongolian given name meaning "strong flower".

Notable people with the name include:

- Altantsetsegiin Battsetseg (1994-), Mongolian freestyle wrestler
- Baatarzorigiin Battsetseg, Mongolian wrestler
- Battsetseg Batmunkh (1973-), Minister of Foreign Affairs of Mongolia
- Soronzonboldyn Battsetseg (1990-), Mongolian freestyle wrestler
- Tsagaan Battsetseg (1972-), Mongolian–American chess player
