= Dashiin Tserendagva =

Mongolian chess player

Personal information
- Born: 5 March 1916 Altachey, Russian Empire
- Died: unknown

Chess career
- Country: Mongolia

Dashiin Tserendagva (Mongolian: Дашиингийн Цэрэндагва; born 5 March 1916 in Altachey, Russian Empire) was a Mongolian chess player and three-time Mongolian Chess Championship winner (1953, 1954, 1957).

== Biography ==
After Dashiin Tserendagva graduated from the Rabfak in Ulan-Ude in 1936, he worked as a teacher and researcher in Ulaanbaatar. In the 1950s he became one of Mongolia's leading chess players. He was the first multiple chess champion of the country, winning the Mongolian Chess Championship in 1953, 1954, and 1957.

In 1956, Dashiin Tserendagva played for Mongolia on the first reserve board in the 12th Chess Olympiad in Moscow, scoring three wins, one draw, and two losses.
