= Artur Hennings =

German chess player (1940–2003)

Personal information
- Born: 11 July 1940 Schwerin, Germany
- Died: 12 November 2003 (aged 63) Schwerin, Germany

Chess career
- Country: Germany
- Title: International Master (1965)
- Peak rating: 2475 (July 1971)

Artur Hennings (11 July 1940 – 12 November 2003) was a German chess International Master (IM) (1965), East Germany Chess Championships medalist (1965, 1969, 1970), European Team Chess Championship team medalist (1970).

== Biography ==
In the 1960s and 1970s Artur Hennings was one of the leading East Germany chess players. From 1963 to 1973 he seven times played in East Germany Chess Championship finals and won three medals: silver (1969) and two bronze (1965, 1970). Artur Hennings has achieved several successes in international chess tournaments, including first or shared first place in Bydgoszcz (1964), Bucharest (1971, shared with Yuri Averbakh), Amsterdam (1972, IBM B tournament, shared with Dražen Marović and Gyula Sax), Lublin (1973) and Leipzig (1978, shared with Lothar Vogt). In 1965, he was awarded the FIDE International Master (IM) title.

Artur Hennings played for East Germany in the Chess Olympiads:

- In 1968, at second reserve board in the 18th Chess Olympiad in Lugano (+2, =4, -2),
- In 1970, at fourth board in the 19th Chess Olympiad in Siegen (+7, =7, -1).

Artur Hennings played for East Germany in the European Team Chess Championship:

- In 1970, at fourth board in the 4th European Team Chess Championship in Kapfenberg (+2, =3, -2), and won team bronze medal.

Artur Hennings played for East Germany in the World Student Team Chess Championships:

- In 1965, at first board in the 12th World Student Team Chess Championship in Sinaia (+3, =6, -3),
- In 1966, at first board in the 13th World Student Team Chess Championship in Örebro (+4, =3, -5),
- In 1967, at first board in the 14th World Student Team Chess Championship in Harrachov (+5, =3, -4).
