= Üitümen =

Üitümen is a masculine given name of Mongolian origin. People with that name include:

- Orgodolyn Üitümen (born 1989), Mongolian freestyle wrestler who competed at the 2012 and 2016 Summer Olympics
- Tüdeviin Üitümen (1939–1993), Mongolian chess master
