= George Kane =

George Kane may refer to:

- George Proctor Kane (1820–1878), mayor of Baltimore, Maryland, 1877–1878
- George Kane (American football) (1891–1969), American football player
- George Kane (literary scholar) (1916–2008), Canadian literary scholar
- George Francis Kane (born 1948), American chess player and writer
- George Kane (director), Irish film and television director

== See also ==
- George Cain (1943–2010), author
- George Caines (1771–1825), first official reporter of cases in the United States
- George Cane (1881–1968), British diver
