= Karl Pedersen =

Karl Pedersen may refer to:

- Karl Pedersen (chess player) (born 1940), Danish chess player
- Karl Pedersen (footballer) (1907–1977), Norwegian footballer
- Karl Pedersen (wrestler) (1902–1988), Norwegian wrestler at the 1928 Olympics
