= Sharavyn Pürevjav =

Mongolian chess player

Personal information
- Born: 1927 (age 98–99) Bulgan, Dornod, Mongolia

Chess career
- Country: Mongolia

Sharavyn Pürevjav (Mongolian: Шаравын Пүрэвжав; born 1927) is a Mongolian chess player and Mongolian Chess Championship winner (1962).

== Biography ==
By profession Sharavyn Pürevjav was a mathematics teacher. He learned to play chess at the age of 20. In the 1950s and 1960s Sharavyn Pürevjav was one of Mongolia's leading chess players. In 1962, he won the Mongolian Chess Championship.

Sharavyn Pürevjav played for Mongolia in the Chess Olympiads:

- In 1962, at first board in the 15th Chess Olympiad in Varna (+3, =7, -7),
- In 1964, at third board in the 16th Chess Olympiad in Tel Aviv (+2, =2, -6),
- In 1968, at second reserve board in the 18th Chess Olympiad in Lugano (+1, =3, -2),
- In 1974, at second reserve board in the 21st Chess Olympiad in Nice (+2, =3, -0).

Sharav Purevzhav played for Mongolia in the World Student Team Chess Championship:

- In 1958, at fourth board in the 5th World Student Team Chess Championship in Varna (+2, =2, -3).
