= Tseveenii Jügder =

Mongolian chess player

Personal information
- Born: 1919 Bulgan, Mongolia
- Died: unknown

Chess career
- Country: Mongolia

Tseveenii Jügder (Mongolian: Цэвээний Жүгдэр) was a Mongolian chess player and Mongolian Chess Championship winner (1955).

== Biography ==
He was born in 1919 in Bulgan, Dornod. In the 1950s, Tseveenii Jügder was one of Mongolia's leading chess players. In 1955 he won the Mongolian Chess Championship.

Tseveenii Jügder played for Mongolia in the Chess Olympiad:

- In 1956, at first board in the 12th Chess Olympiad in Moscow (+4, =3, -9).

Tseveenii Jügder played for Mongolia in the World Student Team Chess Championship:

- In 1957, at first reserve board in the 4th World Student Team Chess Championship in Reykjavík (+2, =2, -2).
