= Aldarkhaan, Zavkhan =

District in Zavkhan Province, Mongolia

Coordinates: 47°38′19″N 96°32′07″E

Aldarkhaan District Алдархаан сум ᠠᠯᠳᠠᠷ ᠬᠠᠭᠠᠨᠰᠤᠮᠤ
- District
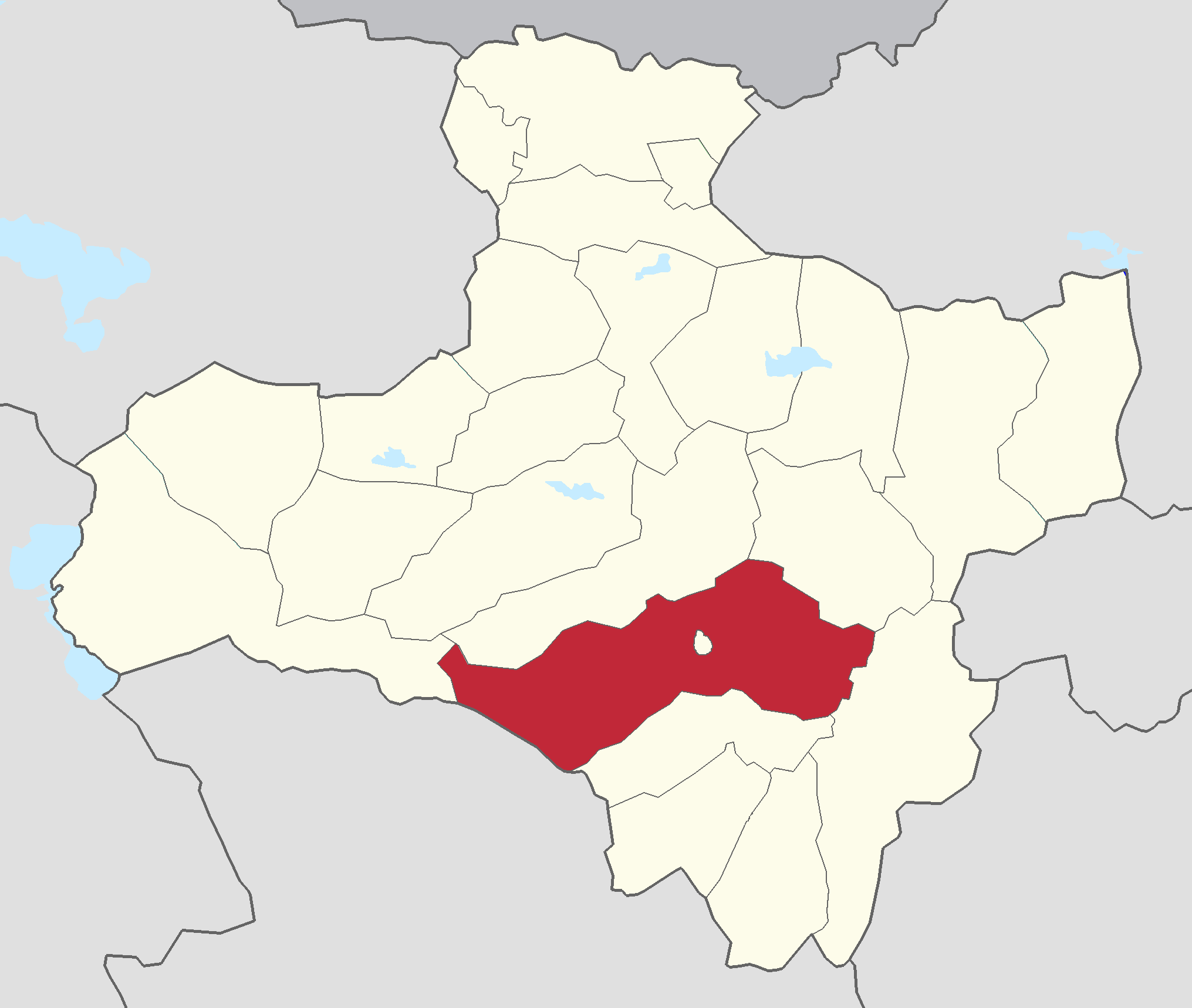
- Country: Mongolia
- Province: Zavkhan Province
- Time zone: UTC+8 (UTC + 8)
- Climate: BSk

Aldarkhaan (Mongolian: Алдархаан) is a sum of Zavkhan Province in western Mongolia. In 2005, its population was 3,708.

== Administrative divisions ==
The district is divided into six bags, which are:

- Aldar
- Argalant
- Bogdiin Gol
- Chigestei
- Mandaat
- Uguumur

== Infrastructures ==
- Borkh Solar Power Plant

== Notable natives ==
- Begziin Yavuukhulan, poet
- Noroviin Baatar, ballet dancer and actor
- Püreviin Jigjidsüren, chess player
