= Ganginchugin Hulgana =

Mongolian chess player (born 1929)

Personal information
- Born: 15 January 1929 (age 97)

Chess career
- Country: Mongolia
- Title: Woman FIDE Master (1992)
- Peak rating: 2105 (January 1988)

Ganginchugin Hulgana (Mongolian: Гангинчугин Хулгана; born 15 January 1929) is a Mongolian chess player who holds the title of Woman FIDE Master (WFM, 1992). She is a six-time winner of the Mongolian Women's Chess Championship (1958, 1962, 1972, 1976, 1978, 1982).

== Biography ==
From the end of 1950s to the begin to 1980s Ganginchugin Hulgana was the leading Mongolian women's chess player. She six time won Mongolian Women's Chess Championship: 1958, 1962, 1972, 1976, 1978, and 1982.

Ganginchugin Hulgana played for Mongolia in the Women's Chess Olympiads:

- In 1963, at first board in the 2nd Chess Olympiad (women) in Split (+4, =2, -8),
- In 1972, at first board in the 5th Chess Olympiad (women) in Skopje (+3, =3, -5),
- In 1982, at first board in the 10th Chess Olympiad (women) in Lucerne (+4, =5, -5).

In 1992, she awarded the Women FIDE Master (WFM) title.
