= Purev Tumurbator =

Mongolian chess player (born 1936)

Personal information
- Born: 6 January 1936 (age 90)

Chess career
- Country: Mongolia

Purev Tumurbator (Mongolian: Пүрэвийн Төмөрбаатар; born 6 January 1936) is a Mongolian chess player, two-times Mongolian Chess Championship winner (1956, 1969).

== Biography ==
From the 1950s to the 1980s Purev Tumurbator was one of Mongolian leading chess players. He twice won Mongolian Chess Championship: 1956 and 1969. Purev Tumurbator twice participated in World Chess Championship Zonal tournaments: in 1969 (he shared 4th–5th place in West Asian Zonal in Singapore) and in 1972 (he ranked in 8th place in Asia West Zonal in Teheran).

Purev Tumurbator played for Mongolia in the Chess Olympiads:

- In 1956, at fourth board in the 12th Chess Olympiad in Moscow (+3, =6, -6),
- In 1972, at third board in the 20th Chess Olympiad in Skopje (+5, =8, -4),
- In 1974, at first reserve board in the 21st Chess Olympiad in Nice (+6, =4, -4),
- In 1980, at second board in the 24th Chess Olympiad in La Valletta (+4, =5, -5).

Purev Tumurbator played for Mongolia in the World Student Team Chess Championships:

- In 1957, at first board in the 4th World Student Team Chess Championship in Reykjavík (+2, =1, -10),
- In 1958, at second board in the 5th World Student Team Chess Championship in Varna (+7, =1, -2) and won individual gold medal,
- In 1959, at first board in the 6th World Student Team Chess Championship in Budapest (+1, =4, -8),
- In 1960, at first board in the 7th World Student Team Chess Championship in Leningrad (+2, =1, -10),
- In 1961, at third board in the 8th World Student Team Chess Championship in Helsinki (+2, =2, -6),
- In 1963, at first board in the 10th World Student Team Chess Championship in Budva (+0, =0, -3).
