= Sandagdorj Handsuren =

Mongolian chess player (born 1940)

Personal information
- Born: 5 May 1940 (age 86) Ulaanbaatar, Mongolia

Chess career
- Country: Mongolia
- Title: Woman International Master (1972)
- Peak rating: 2065 (January 2000)

Sandagdorj Handsuren (also spelled Khandsuren, born 5 May 1940) is a Mongolian chess player who holds the FIDE title of Woman International Master (WIM, 1972). She is a winner of the Mongolian Women's Chess Championship (1968).

== Biography ==
From the 1960s to the 1970s, Sandagdorj Handsuren was one of the leading Mongolian women's chess players. In 1968, she won Mongolian Women's Chess Championship. In 1961, Sandagdorj Handsuren participated at Women's World Chess Championship Candidates Tournament in Vrnjačka Banja, making her the first Mongolian player to qualify for the Candidates and she finished in the 17th place.

Sandagdorj Handsuren played for Mongolia in the Women's Chess Olympiads:

- In 1963, at second board in the 2nd Chess Olympiad (women) in Split (+5, =1, -8),
- In 1972, at second board in the 5th Chess Olympiad (women) in Skopje (+2, =3, -4).

In 1972, she awarded the FIDE Woman International Master (WIM) title.
