= Kenneth McAlpine (chess player) =

Scottish chess player

Personal information
- Born: 11 April 1945 (age 81)

Chess career
- Country: United Kingdom
- Title: International Correspondence Chess Master (1990)

Kenneth McAlpine (born 11 April 1945) is a Scottish chess player, International Correspondence Chess Master (1990), Scottish Chess Championship medalist (1962, 1963).

== Biography ==
In 1960 in Leicester Kenneth McAlpine shared 2nd place in the British Youth Chess Championship (U15). In 1961 he won Scottish Boys' Chess Championship. Kenneth McAlpine twice played in British Junior Chess Championships (1962, 1963) and shared 2nd place in 1963. Kenneth McAlpine competed in several Scottish Chess Championships. He twice in row finished in 2nd place (1962, 1963). Also Kenneth McAlpine won British Universities' Individual Chess Championship in 1966.

In later years, Kenneth McAlpine active participated in correspondence chess tournaments. He won Scottish Correspondence Chess Championships in 1975–76, 1976–77 and 1977–78. In 1979, he was awarded the Scottish Master title for Correspondence Chess and received the ICCF International Master title in 1990.

Kenneth McAlpine played for Scotland in the Chess Olympiads:

- In 1966, at third board in the 17th Chess Olympiad in Havana (+2, =4, -7),
- In 1968, at third board in the 18th Chess Olympiad in Lugano (+0, =2, -7).

Kenneth McAlpine played for Scotland in the World Student Team Chess Championships:

- In 1966, at second board in the 13th World Student Team Chess Championship in Örebro (+3, =2, -4).
