= Bayarsaikhan Gundavaa =

Mongolian chess grandmaster (born 1989)

Personal information
- Native name: Баярсайханы Гүндаваа
- Born: 29 May 1989 (age 37) Övörkhangai Province, Mongolia

Chess career
- Country: Mongolia
- Title: Grandmaster (2013)
- FIDE rating: 2468 (November 2026)
- Peak rating: 2530 (October 2012)

Bayarsaikhan Gundavaa (Mongolian: Баярсайханы Гүндаваа, also transliterated as Bayarsaikhany Gündavaa; born 29 May 1989) is a Mongolian chess Grandmaster (2013). He was also awarded the title of FIDE Trainer in 2015.

== Chess career ==
Gundavaa is a four-time Mongolian Chess Champion, having won the national title in 2008, 2009, 2012, and 2013.

He has represented Mongolia in five Chess Olympiads (2006–2014) and two Asian Team Chess Championships (2012 and 2016).
