= Mongolian Chess Championship =

Sport competition in Mongolia

The Mongolian Chess Championship is currently organized by the Mongolian Chess Federation (Mongolian: Монголын Шатрын Холбоо). The first national championship was held in 1948 and the first women's championship was held in 1954. Bazar Khatanbaatar holds the record for most national championships won, with eight; Tsagaan Battsetseg leads in women's titles with seven.

== National championship winners ==
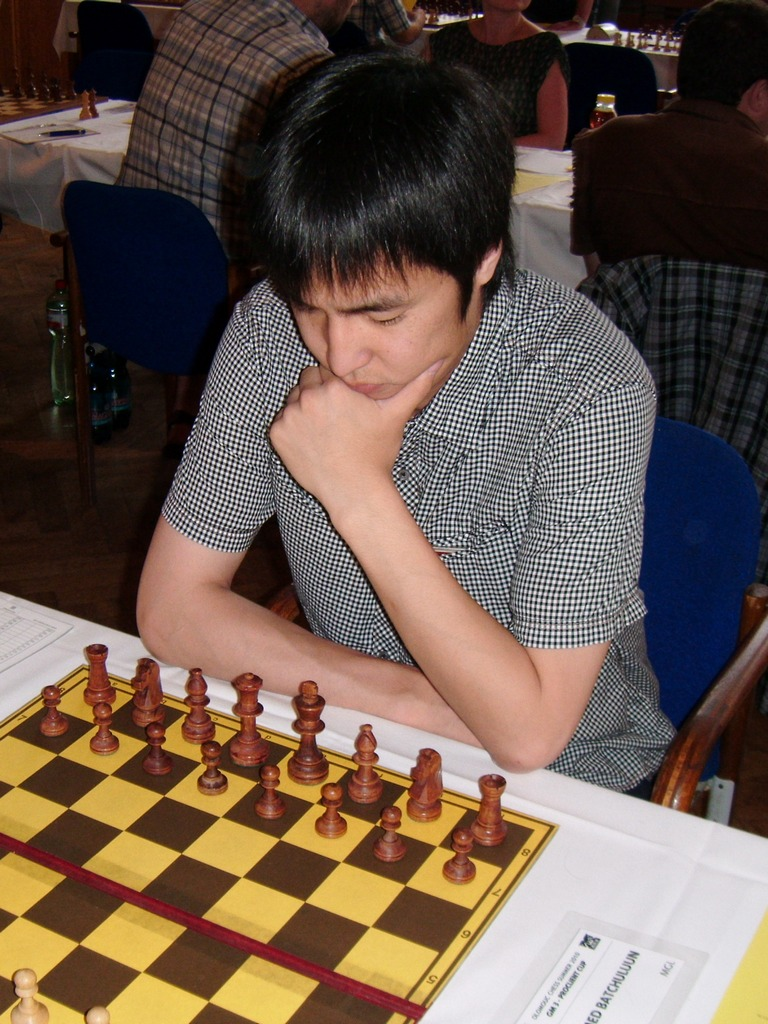
Tsegmed Batchuluun, Mongolian champion in 2006, 2014, 2015 and 2017

No.	Year	Champion
1	1948	Damdiny Namsrai
2	1950	Tserendorj Tsedenjav
3	1951	Idshingiin Yondon-Osor
4	1952	Jürmediin Dugar
5	1953	Dashiin Tserendagva
6	1954	Dashiin Tserendagva
7	1955	Tseveenii Jügder
8	1956	Purev Tumurbator
9	1957	Dashiin Tserendagva
10	1958	Sürengiin Möömöö
11	1959	Naidan Namzhil
12	1961	Gonchigiin Chalkhaasüren
13	1962	Sharavyn Pürevjav
14	1964	Donoy Tsend
15	1965	Lhamsuren Myagmarsuren
16	1969	Purev Tumurbator
17	1972	Tüdeviin Üitümen
18	1974	Jambaldoo Lhagva
19	1976	Jambaldoo Lhagva
20	1977	Jambaldoo Lhagva
21	1978	Tüdeviin Üitümen
22	1980	Lhamsuren Myagmarsuren
23	1981	Lhamsuren Myagmarsuren
24	1982	Lhamsuren Myagmarsuren
25	1984	Nyamaa Turbat
26	1985	Püreviin Jigjidsüren
27	1986	Tüdeviin Üitümen
28	1988	Ishdagva Ganbaatar
29	1989	Nyamaa Tumurhuyag
30	1990	Jambaldoo Lhagva
31	1991	Bazar Khatanbaatar
32	1992	Jambaldoo Lhagva
33	1993	Dashzeveg Sharavdorj
34	1994	Bazar Khatanbaatar
35	1995	Dashzeveg Sharavdorj
36	1996	Cedendemberel Lhagvasüren
37	1997	Jambaldoo Lhagva
38	1998	Bazar Khatanbaatar
39	1999	Nyamaa Tuvsanaa
40	2000	Bazar Khatanbaatar
41	2001	Bazar Khatanbaatar
42	2002	Dashzeveg Sharavdorj
43	2003	Bazar Khatanbaatar
44	2004	Bazar Khatanbaatar
45	2005	Bazar Khatanbaatar
46	2006	Tsegmed Batchuluun
47	2007	Balgan Bayarmandakh
48	2008	Bayarsaikhan Gundavaa
49	2009	Bayarsaikhan Gundavaa
50	2010	Namkhai Battulga
51	2011	Myagmarsüren Gunbayar
52	2012	Bayarsaikhan Gundavaa
53	2013	Bayarsaikhan Gundavaa
54	2014	Tsegmed Batchuluun
55	2015	Tsegmed Batchuluun
56	2016	Munkhgal Gombosuren
57	2017	Tsegmed Batchuluun
58	2018	Bilguun Sumiya
59	2019	Agibileg Uurtsaikh
60	2020	
61	2021	
62	2022	Dambasürengiin Batsüren

== National women's championship winners ==
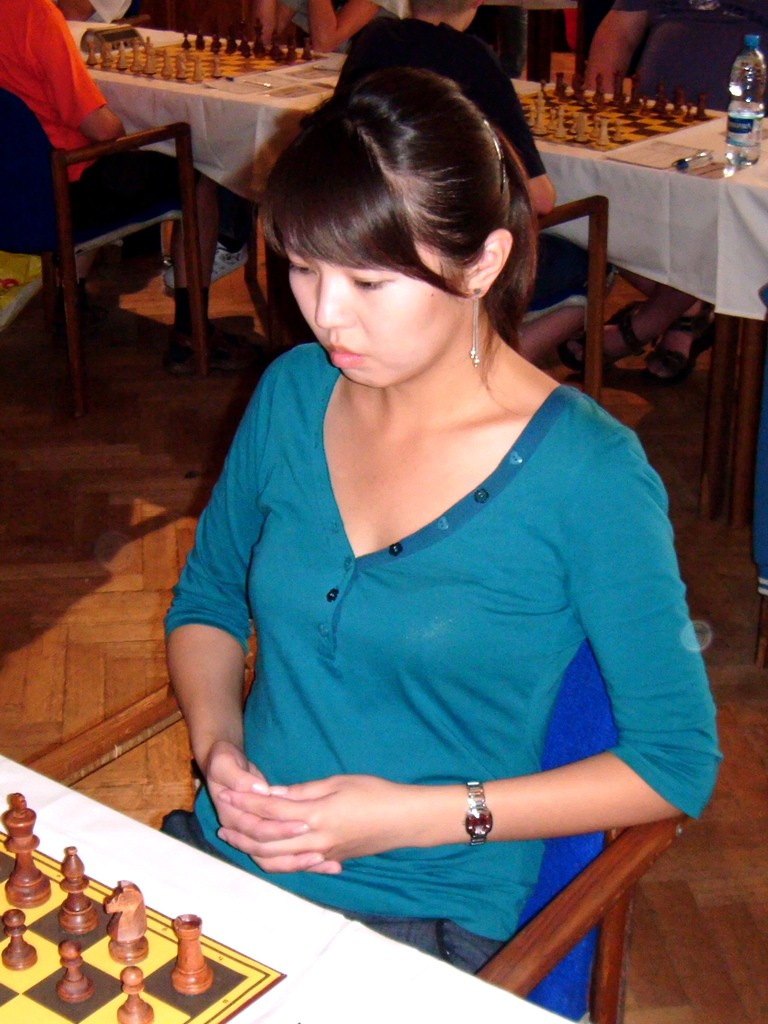
Dulamsüren Yanjindulam, Mongolian women's champion in 2006, 2008, 2012 and 2013

No.	Year	Champion
1	1954	Delgermörön Byambaa
2	1956	G. Ichinkhorloo
3	1958	Ganginchugin Hulgana
4	1960	Delgermörön Byambaa
5	1962	Ganginchugin Hulgana
6	1964	Delgermörön Byambaa
7	1965	Delgermörön Byambaa
8	1968	Sandagdorj Handsuren
9	1972	Ganginchugin Hulgana
10	1974	Purevdorj Büjinlkham
11	1976	Ganginchugin Hulgana
12	1977	Purevdorj Büjinlkham
13	1978	Ganginchugin Hulgana
14	1980	Gendenjamc Bayarmaa
15	1981	Shirchin Battsengel
16	1982	Ganginchugin Hulgana
17	1984	Suuri Tungalag
18	1985	B. Myagmarsüren
19	1986	Suuri Tungalag
20	1988	Ulziybat Gerelmaa
21	1989	Tsagaan Battsetseg
22	1990	Tsagaan Battsetseg
23	1991	Genden Oyuunchimeg
24	1992	Tsagaan Battsetseg
25	1993	Nyamaa Tungalag
26	1994	Tsagaan Battsetseg
27	1995	Tsagaan Battsetseg
28	1996	Tsagaan Battsetseg
29	1997	Tsagaan Battsetseg
30	1998	Dovdon Majigsüren
31	1999	Tüvshintugs Battsetseg
32	2000	Tüvshintugs Battsetseg
33	2001	Bayanmunkh Ankhchimeg
34	2002	Bayanmunkh Ankhchimeg
35	2003	Bayanmunkh Ankhchimeg
36	2004	Tüvshintugs Battsetseg
37	2005	Bayanmunkh Ankhchimeg
38	2006	Dulamsüren Yanjindulam
39	2007	Sengeravdan Otgonjargal
40	2008	Dulamsüren Yanjindulam
41	2009	Uuganbayar Lkhamsüren
42	2010	Uuganbayar Lkhamsüren
43	2011	Tüvshintugs Batchimeg
44	2012	Dulamsüren Yanjindulam
45	2013	Uuganbayar Lkhamsüren
46	2014	Bayarjargal Bayarmaa
47	2015	Bayanmunkh Ankhchimeg
48	2016	Tüvshintugs Batchimeg
49	2017	Uurtsaikh Uuriintuya
50	2018	Batkhuyag Munguntuul
51	2019	Altantuya Boldbaatar
52	2020	
53	2021	
54	2022	Altan-Ulzii Enkhtuul
