= Begziin Yavuukhulan =

Mongolian poet

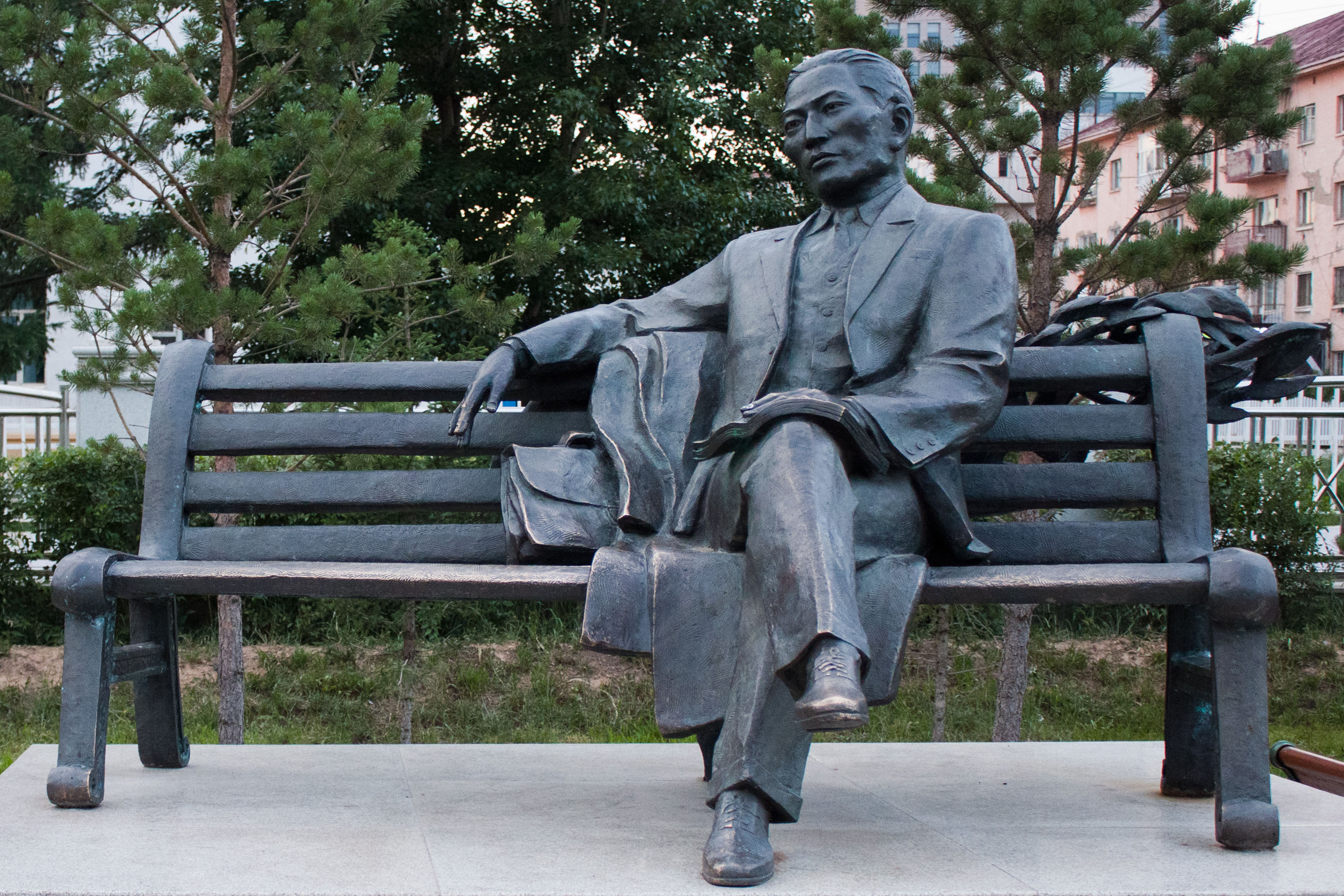
- Statue in Ulaanbaatar
- Born: Begziin Yavuukhulan; 1929; Jargalant, Aldarkhaan, Zavkhan, Mongolia
- Died: 1982 (aged 52–53)
- Occupation: Poet
- Children: 2 children
- Writing career
- Language: Mongolian, Russian
- Genre: Poetry
- Notable works: Би хаана төрөө вэ? Мөнгөн хазаарын чимээ Тэхийн зогсоол Хар-Ус нуурын шагшуурга Хээр хоносон сар

Begziin Yavuukhulan (Mongolian: Бэгзийн Явуухулан, 1929-1982) was a Mongolian poet of the communist era that wrote in Mongolian and Russian.

== Biography ==
Begziin Yavuukhulan was born into a family of a hunters in Jargalant, Aldarkhaan, Zavkhan, Mongolia. He graduated from the financial and economic technical school. He worked as an accountant. Then he went to work for a youth newspaper. He worked in the magazine "Tsog" ("Ogonyok"). He spent five years in the Soviet Union. In 1959 he graduated from the Maxim Gorky Literature Institute. He rose to fame as a poet. In addition to traditional genres, he mastered the genre of haiku. He also acted as a translator of Russian poets, in particular Sergei Yesenin.

He had a significant influence on Mongolian literature, and was the teacher of the poet G. Mend Ooyoo.

A collection of his poetry has been published by the Academy of Culture and Poetry. They were also featured in a collection of short stories, poems and songs titled A String of Pearly Drops (Suvdan dusaalyn khelkhees).
