= Andrzej Sydor =

Polish chess player (born 1937)

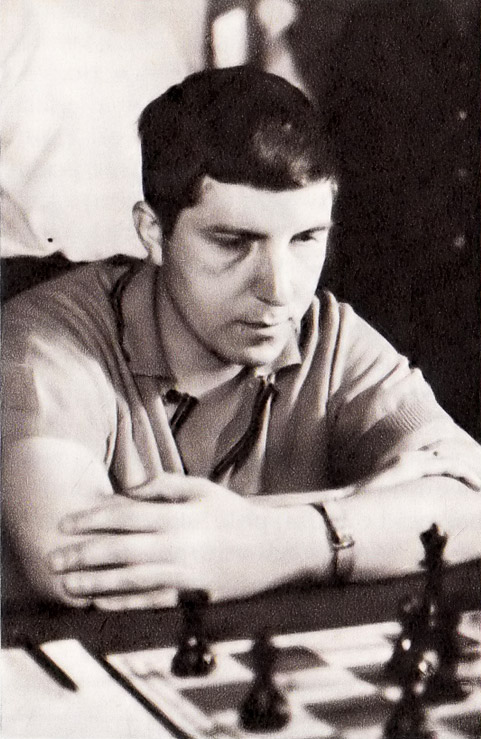
- Andrzej Sydor in 1970s

Personal information
- Born: 3 January 1937 (age 89) Lublin, Poland

Chess career
- Country: Poland
- Title: International Master (1970)
- Peak rating: 2425 (January 1976)

Andrzej Sydor (born 3 January 1937) is a Polish chess International Master (IM) (1970), Polish Chess Championship medalist (1965, 1969), European Team Chess Championship individual medalist (1973).

== Biography ==
Andrzej Sydor first success was in 1953 in Szczecin, where he won a gold medal in Polish Junior Chess Championship in U20 age group. In the years 1965–1984, Andrzej Sydor fourteen times participated in the Polish Chess Championships finals which were most successful in 1965 and in 1969 in Lublin, both of which he won bronze medals.

Andrzej Sydor was winner of many international chess tournament awards, including 1st place in Debrecen (1967), 2nd place in Čoka (1971), 3rd place in Gausdal (1978), 2nd place in Barcelona (1979), shared 2nd-3rd place in Zamárdi (1979), shared 1st-3rd place in Courchevel (1980), shared 1st-3rd place in Čoka (1981), 1st place in Bagneux (1981) and 2nd place in Val Thorens (1981). He was awarded the FIDE International Master (IM) title in 1970.

Andrzej Sydor played for Poland in the Chess Olympiads:

- In 1972, at second reserve board in the 20th Chess Olympiad in Skopje (+2, =8, -2).

Andrzej Sydor played for Poland in the European Team Chess Championship:

- In 1973, at eight board in the 5th European Team Chess Championship in Bath (+1, =4, -0) and won individual silver medal.

Andrzej Sydor played for Poland in the World Student Team Chess Championships:

- In 1956, at first reserve board in the 3rd World Student Team Chess Championship in Uppsala (+3, =1, -1),
- In 1958, at third board in the 5th World Student Team Chess Championship in Varna (+8, =0, -2) and won individual gold medal.

Since 1995, he has not participated in tournaments classified by FIDE.
