= Glicerio Badilles =

Filipino chess player

Chess career
- Country: Philippines

Glicerio Badilles (unknown – unknown), was a Filipino chess player, Chess Olympiad individual gold medalist (1968).

== Biography ==
From the begin of 1950s to the begin of 1970s Glicerio Badilles was one of Filipino leading chess players, nicknamed as "Chess Lion of Cebu".

Glicerio Badilles has three times represented the Philippine team in the Chess Olympiads (1956, 1964, 1972). In 1956, at first board, he replaced the then Philippine chess champion Florencio Campomanes, who excused himself with fatigue and asked Badilles to change boards. Also Glicerio Badilles participated in 18th Chess Olympiad in 1968. He arrived as the coach of the Philippine chess team, but at the last moment agreed to represent Hong Kong's national team, which lacked one player. At the reserve board, Badilles has won 11½ points out of 14 possible and won an individual gold medal, while the other Hong Kong chess players have collected only 17½ points.

In 1963, Glicerio Badilles represented the Philippines in the World Chess Championship Southeast Asian Zonal Tournament. In 1967, he participated in the simultaneous exhibition of the Filipino leading chess players against the next World Chess Champion Bobby Fischer. In 1968, he participated in Manila's International Chess Tournament.

Glicerio Badilles Memorial Chess Tournaments take place in the resort village of Moalboal, Cebu Island.
