= Buyant, Khovd =

District in Khovd Province, Mongolia

Coordinates: 48°10′22″N 91°46′05″E

Buyant District Буянт сум ᠪᠤᠶᠠᠨᠲᠤᠰᠤᠮᠤ
- District
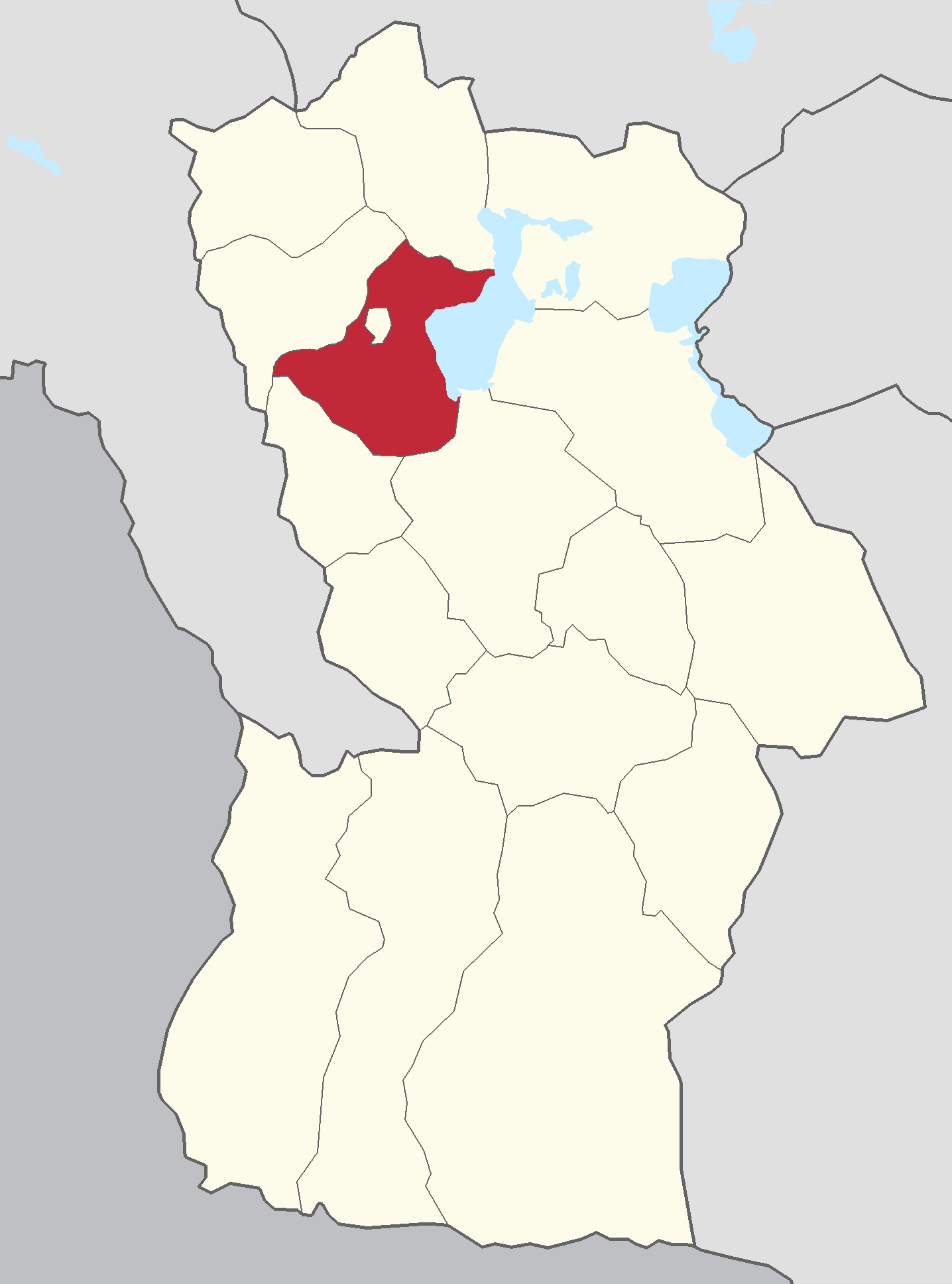
- Buyant District in Khovd Province
- Country: Mongolia
- Province: Khovd Province

Area
  - Total: 3,759 km^{2} (1,451 sq mi)
- Time zone: UTC+7 (UTC + 7)
- Website: http://buyant.kho.gov.mn/

Buyant (Mongolian: Буянт) is a sum (district) of Khovd Province in western Mongolia. It is 19 km away from the city of Khovd.

== Administrative divisions ==
The district is divided into five bags, which are:

- Narankhairkhan
- Nariin Gol
- Norjinkhairkhan
- Tsagaan-Ereg
- Tsagaanburgas

== Notable natives ==
- Lhamsuren Myagmarsuren, chess master
- Losolyn Laagan, politician
