= Jambaldoo Lhagva =

Mongolian chess player (born 1944)

Personal information
- Born: 10 September 1944 (age 81)

Chess career
- Country: Mongolia
- Title: FIDE Master (1989); International Arbiter
- FIDE rating: 2114 (August 2019)
- Peak rating: 2335 (January 1981)

Jambaldoo Lhagva (Mongolian: Жамбалдоогийн Лхагва; born 10 September 1944) is a Mongolian chess player who holds the FIDE titles of FIDE Master (FM) and International Arbiter (IA). He is a six-time Mongolian Chess Championship winner (1974, 1976, 1977, 1990, 1992, 1997).

== Biography ==
From the 1960s to the 1990s, Lhagva was one of leading Mongolian chess players. He won the Mongolian Chess Championship six times: 1974, 1976, 1977, 1990, 1992, and 1997. He participated in a number of international chess tournaments.

He played for Mongolia in the Chess Olympiads:

- In 1968, at the third board in the 18th Chess Olympiad in Lugano (+4, =5, -6),
- In 1970, at the third board in the 19th Chess Olympiad in Siegen (+9, =5, -5),
- In 1974, at the first board in the 21st Chess Olympiad in Nice (+8, =6, -6),
- In 1980, at the fourth board in the 24th Chess Olympiad in La Valletta (+3, =5, -6),
- In 1982, at the fourth board in the 25th Chess Olympiad in Lucerne (+9, =0, -5),
- In 1990, at the first reserve board in the 29th Chess Olympiad in Novi Sad (+4, =3, -3),
- In 1992, at the fourth board in the 30th Chess Olympiad in Manila (+3, =0, -3).

Lhagva is a graduate of the chess department at the Russian State University of Physical Education, Sport, Youth and Tourism where he was coached under Mark Dvoretsky.
