= Emil Ungureanu =

Romanian chess player (1936–2012)

Personal information
- Born: 1 November 1936 Târgu Jiu, Romania
- Died: 2012

Chess career
- Country: Romania
- Title: International Master (1978)

Emil Ungureanu (1 November 1936 – 2012) was a Romanian chess International Master (1978), Romanian Chess Championships medalist (1968, 1971, 1975).

== Biography ==
In the second half of the 1960s and in the 1970s, Emil Ungureanu was one of the leading Romanian chess players. He competed many times in the finals of Romanian Chess Championship and won three medals: two silver (1968, 1971) and bronze (1975).

Emil Ungureanu won International Chess Tournaments in Bucharest (1960), Sinaia (1961), Sibiu (1970), Craiova (1971), Oradea (1973) and Brașov (1974). In 1977, he divided the 4th place with Miodrag Todorcevic) in Round-robin tournament in Timișoara (behind Ratmir Kholmov, Nikola Padevsky and Vlastimil Jansa). In 1999, in Timișoara in the Open Chess tournament Emil Ungureanu shared the first place (ahead Cristina Adela Foișor). In 1978, he was awarded the FIDE International Master (IM) title.

Emil Ungureanu played for Romania in the Chess Olympiads:

- In 1968, at second reserve board in the 18th Chess Olympiad in Lugano (+3, =5, -2),
- In 1970, at fourth board in the 19th Chess Olympiad in Siegen (+4, =2, -4),
- In 1972, at fourth board in the 20th Chess Olympiad in Skopje (+3, =7, -3).

Emil Ungureanu played for Romania in the European Team Chess Championship:

- In 1973, at eight board in the 5th European Team Chess Championship in Bath (+1, =3, -1),
- In 1977, at eight board in the 6th European Team Chess Championship in Moscow (+3, =2, -2).

Emil Ungureanu played for Romania in the World Student Team Chess Championship:

- In 1962, at fourth board in the 9th World Student Team Chess Championship in Mariánské Lázně (+5, =2, -4).

Emil Ungureanu played for Romania in the Men's Chess Balkaniads:

- In 1971, at sixth board in the 3rd Men's Chess Balkaniad in Athens (+1, =1, -0) and won team gold and individual silver medals,
- In 1972, at sixth board in the 4th Men's Chess Balkaniad in Sofia (+2, =2, -0) and won team bronze and individual silver medals,
- In 1973, at seventh board in the 5th Men's Chess Balkaniad in Poiana Brașov (+1, =0, -1) and won team silver medal,
- In 1977, at first reserve board in the 9th Men's Chess Balkaniad in Albena (+2, =1, -0) and won team gold and individual silver medals,
- In 1978, at third board in the 10th Men's Chess Balkaniad in Băile Herculane (+0, =2, -0) and won team silver and individual bronze medals.
