= Ulla Bohmgren =

Swedish chess player

Personal information
- Born: 3 October 1953 (age 72)

Chess career
- Country: Sweden
- Peak rating: 2005 (January 1990)

Ulla Bohmgren (born 3 October 1953), is a Swedish chess player, Women's Chess Olympiad individual silver medalist (1972).

== Biography ==
In the first half of 1970s Ulla Bohmgren was one of Sweden's leading chess players. In 1971, she won Swedish Junior Chess Championship.

Ulla Bohmgren played for Sweden in the Women's Chess Olympiads:

- In 1972, at first reserve board in the 5th Chess Olympiad (women) in Skopje (+4, =1, -3) and won individual silver medal,
- In 1976, at first reserve board in the 7th Chess Olympiad (women) in Haifa (+3, =1, -4).

Since 1990 she has rarely participated in chess tournaments.
