= Franz Stoppel =

Austrian chess player (1930–2007)

Personal information
- Born: 3 October 1930
- Died: 10 April 2007 (aged 76)

Chess career
- Country: Austria
- Title: FIDE Master (1983)
- Peak rating: 2350 (January 1978)

Franz Stoppel (3 October 1930 – 10 April 2007) was an Austrian chess player who holds the FIDE title of FIDE Master (FM). He was an Austrian Chess Championship medalist (1965, 1967, 1977) and Mitropa Chess Cup winner (1977).

== Biography ==
In the 1960s and 1970s, Franz Stoppel was one of the leading Austrian chess players. He won three bronze medals in the Austrian Chess Championship: 1965, 1967, and 1977. In 1969, in Athens, Franz Stoppel participated in the World Chess Championship European Zonal Tournament, where he shared 13th–15th place.

Franz Stoppel played for Austria in the Chess Olympiads:

- In 1966, at the third board in the 17th Chess Olympiad in Havana (+5, =6, -5),
- In 1968, at the third board in the 18th Chess Olympiad in Lugano (+3, =7, -2),
- In 1974, at the second reserve board in the 21st Chess Olympiad in Nice (+4, =7, -0),
- In 1978, at the third board in the 23rd Chess Olympiad in Buenos Aires (+2, =5, -3).

Franz Stoppel played for Austria in the European Team Chess Championship preliminaries:

- In 1970, at the fifth board in the 4th European Team Chess Championship preliminaries (+1, =4, -0),
- In 1980, at the fourth board in the 7th European Team Chess Championship preliminaries (+0, =1, -2).

Franz Stoppel played for Austria in the Clare Benedict Cup:

- In 1968, at the second board in the 15th Clare Benedict Cup in Bad Aibling (+0, =2, -2),
- In 1973, at the reserve board in the 20th Clare Benedict Cup in Gstaad (+0, =1, -2),
- In 1977, at the third board in the 22nd Clare Benedict Cup in Copenhagen (+2, =2, -2),
- In 1979, at the fourth board in the 23rd Clare Benedict Cup in Cleveland (+0, =6, -0).

Franz Stoppel played for Austria in the Men's Chess Mitropa Cup:

- In 1976, at the fourth board in the 1st Chess Mitropa Cup in Innsbruck (+3, =0, -0), winning an individual gold medal,
- In 1977, at the second board in the 2nd Chess Mitropa Cup in Bad Kohlgrub (+2, =3, -0), winning a team gold medal,
- In 1981, at the first board in the 6th Chess Mitropa Cup in Luxembourg (+0, =6, -0),
- In 1982, at the third board in the 7th Chess Mitropa Cup in Bourgoin-Jallieu (+1, =4, -1), winning a team bronze medal.
