= Peter Nørby =

Danish chess player (born 1940)

Personal information
- Born: 1940 (age 85–86)

Chess career
- Country: Denmark

Peter Nørby (born 1940), is a Danish chess player, Danish Chess Championship medalist (1968, 1970).

== Biography ==
Peter Nørby was multiple participant in Danish Chess Championships. He achieved the best result in 1970, when he shared first place with Bjørn Brinck-Claussen, but lost an additional match. He was also the silver medalist of the Danish Chess Championship in 1968.

Peter Nørby played for Denmark in the Chess Olympiad:

- In 1968, at second reserve board in the 18th Chess Olympiad in Lugano (+0, =3, -4).

Peter Nørby played for Denmark in the European Team Chess Championship:

- In 1970, at second board in the 4th European Team Chess Championship in Kapfenberg (+0, =1, -5).
