= Püreviin Jigjidsüren =

Mongolian chess player (born 1947)

Personal information
- Born: 15 May 1947 (age 79) Aldarkhaan, Zavkhan, Mongolia

Chess career
- Country: Mongolia
- Title: International Master (1988)
- Peak rating: 2395 (January 1988)

Püreviin Jigjidsüren (Mongolian: Пүрэвийн Жигжидсүрэн; born 15 May 1947 in Aldarkhaan, Zavkhan) is a Mongolian chess FIDE International Master (IM) (1988), FIDE Trainer (2015), and a Mongolian Chess Championship winner (1985).

== Biography ==
From the 1970s to the 1980s Püreviin Jigjidsüren was one of Mongolian leading chess players. In 1988 he won the Mongolian Chess Championship.

Püreviin Jigjidsüren played for Mongolia in the Chess Olympiads:

- In 1970, at first reserve board in the 19th Chess Olympiad in Siegen (+3, =3, -2),
- In 1972, at fourth board in the 20th Chess Olympiad in Skopje (+3, =4, -5),
- In 1980, at third board in the 24th Chess Olympiad in La Valletta (+6, =3, -5),
- In 1982, at second board in the 25th Chess Olympiad in Lucerne (+5, =2, -7).
