= Borkh Solar Power Plant =

Photovoltaic power plant in Aldarkhaan, Zavkhan, Mongolia

- Official name: Борх Нарны Цахилгаан Станц
- Country: Mongolia
- Location: Aldarkhaan, Zavkhan
- Coordinates: 47°35′53.4″N 96°28′38.4″E
- Status: Operational
- Construction began: 2021
- Commission date: 2023
- Construction cost: US$7.95 million

Power generation
- Nameplate capacity: 5 MW
- Annual net output: 8.8 GWh

The Borkh Solar Power Plant (Mongolian: Борх Нарны Цахилгаан Станц) is a photovoltaic power station in Aldarkhaan District, Zavkhan Province, Mongolia.

== History ==
The project was approved in September 2018. The construction of the power plant began in 2021 and completed in 2022. It was then commissioned in 2023.

== Technical specifications ==
The power plant has an installed generation capacity of 5 MW. It was constructed with a battery energy storage system named Tsengeg with a capacity of 3.6 MW. Annually, the power plant produces 8.8 GWh of electricity to the central grid of Mongolia.

== Finance ==
The power plant was constructed with a cost of US$7.95 millions. It was financed by the Asian Development Bank.

== See also ==
- List of power stations in Mongolia
