= Bulgan, Dornod =

District in Dornod Province, Mongolia

Coordinates: 47°59′59″N 113°56′00″E

Bulgan District Булган сум ᠪᠤᠯᠠᠭᠠᠨᠰᠤᠮᠤ
- District
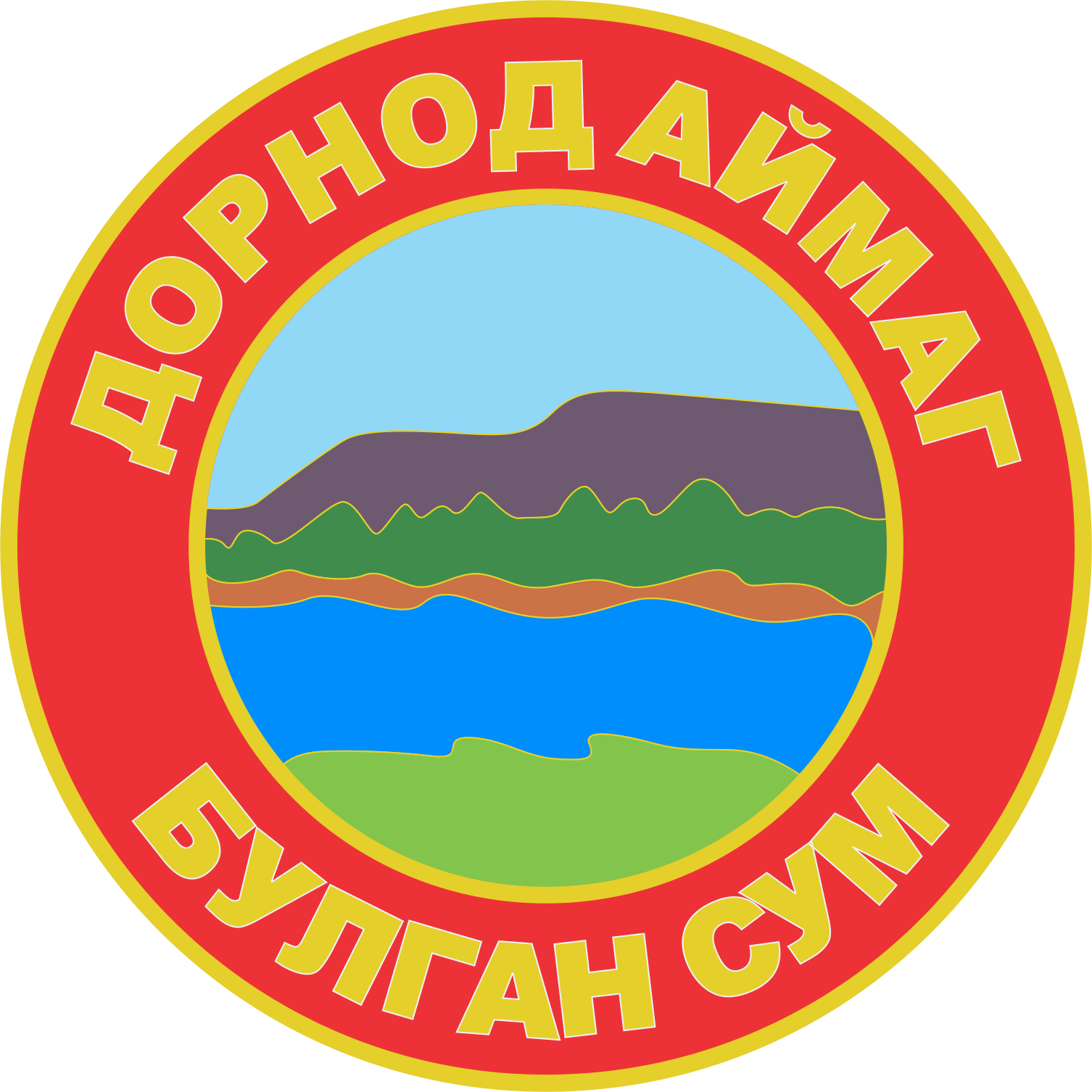
- Seal

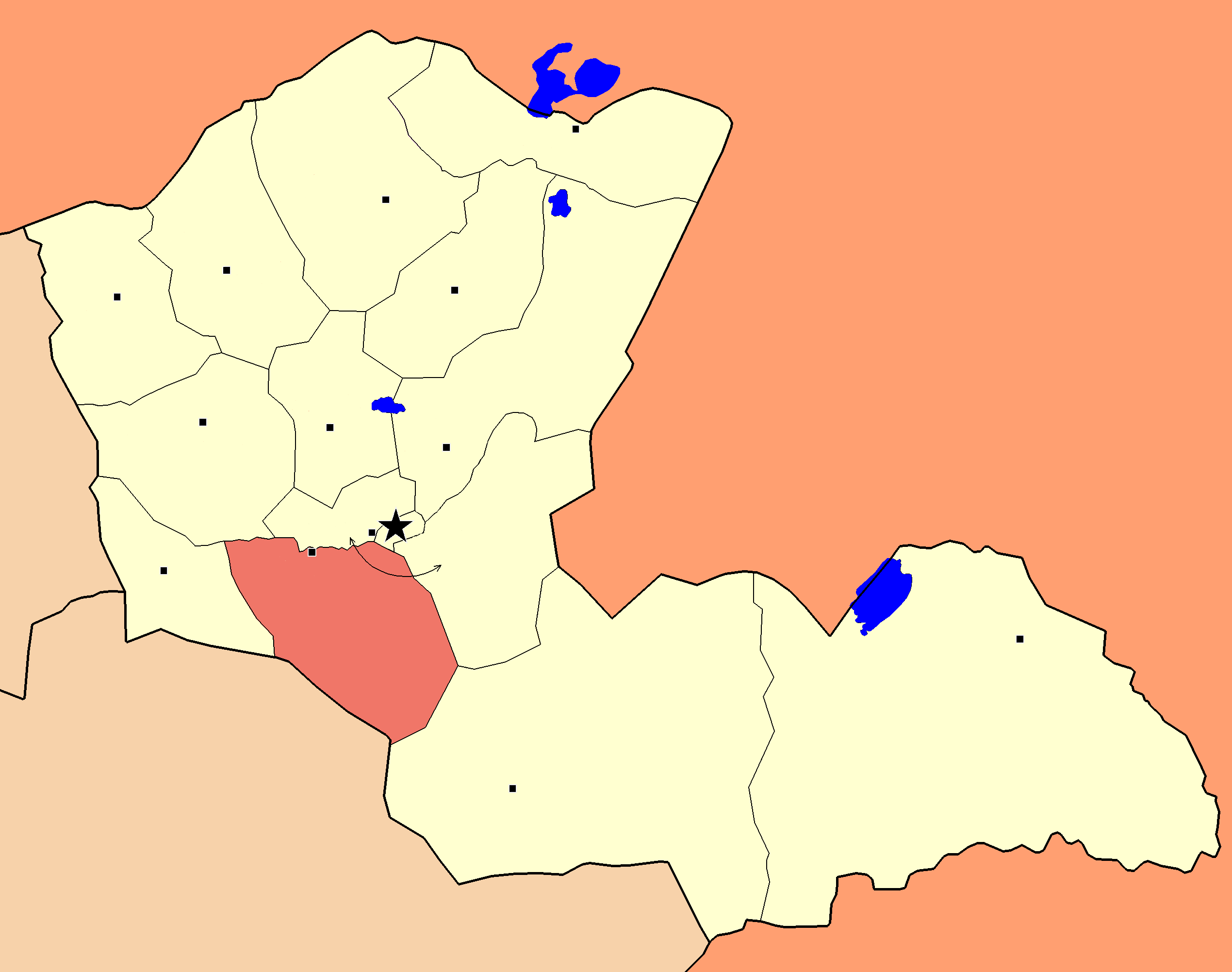
- Bulgan District in Dornod Province
- Country: Mongolia
- Province: Dornod Province

Area
  - Total: 7,111 km^{2} (2,746 sq mi)
- Time zone: UTC+8 (UTC + 8)

Bulgan (Mongolian: Булган) founded in 1931, is a sum (district) of Dornod Province in eastern Mongolia. In 2009, its population was 1,775.

== Location ==
Bulgan is a locality situated in Dornod Province, specifically in the Undurhoshuu area. It is located approximately 53 kilometers from Choibalsan, the provincial capital. This proximity to Choibalsan connects Bulgan to key regional infrastructure and services. It's located 614 km from Ulaanbaatar and 53 km from the province center.

=== Borders ===
The soum is bordered to the east and east by Bayantumen soum, to the southeast by Matad soum, and to the south by Sükhbaatar soum of Sükhbaatar aimag. It is bordered to the west by Khulunbuir soum and to the northwest by Tsagaan-Ovoo soum.

== Administrative divisions ==
The district is divided into four bags, which are:

- Bayan-Uul
- Chuluut
- Khulsan Shand
- Undur Khoshuu

== Notable natives ==
- Sharavyn Pürevjav, chess player
- Tseveenii Jügder, chess player
