= Women's World Chess Championship 1962 =

The 1962 Women's World Chess Championship was won by Nona Gaprindashvili, who beat the reigning champion Elisabeth Bykova in the title match.

== 1961 Candidates Tournament ==
The Candidates Tournament was held in Vrnjačka Banja in October–November 1961 and utterly dominated by rising star Gaprindashvili, who went through the event undefeated and finished a full two points ahead of her closest competitor.

1961 Women's Candidates Tournament
	Player	1	2	3	4	5	6	7	8	9	10	11	12	13	14	15	16	17	Points	Tie break
1	Nona Gaprindashvili (Soviet Union)	-	1	½	½	1	1	1	1	½	1	1	½	½	½	1	1	1	13	
2	Valentina Borisenko (Soviet Union)	0	-	0	½	1	1	1	½	1	½	½	½	½	1	1	1	1	11	
3	Kira Zvorykina (Soviet Union)	½	1	-	½	1	0	0	1	0	½	1	½	1	1	0	1	1	10	
4	Verica Nedeljković (Yugoslavia)	½	½	½	-	0	0	½	½	1	½	½	1	½	½	1	1	1	9½	68.00
5	Milunka Lazarević (Yugoslavia)	0	0	0	1	-	1	0	½	1	1	0	½	1	1	1	1	½	9½	67.75
6	Tatiana Zatulovskaya (Soviet Union)	0	0	1	1	0	-	1	0	0	½	0	1	1	1	1	1	1	9½	64.00
7	Alexandra Nicolau (Romania)	0	0	1	½	1	0	-	1	1	½	½	½	½	0	1	½	1	9	66.50
8	Larissa Volpert (Soviet Union)	0	½	0	½	½	1	0	-	1	1	½	0	1	1	0	1	1	9	65.00
9	Eva Ladanyike-Karakas (Hungary)	½	0	1	0	0	1	0	0	-	1	½	1	1	½	½	1	1	9	63.25
10	Elisabeta Polihroniade (Romania)	0	½	½	½	0	½	½	0	0	-	1	1	½	1	0	1	1	8	
11	Henrijeta Konarkowska (Poland)	0	½	0	½	1	1	½	½	½	0	-	½	0	½	½	½	½	7	
12	Chantal Chaudé de Silans (France)	½	½	½	0	½	0	½	1	0	0	½	-	1	0	½	0	½	6	48.75
13	Gisela Kahn Gresser (USA)	½	½	0	½	0	0	½	0	0	½	1	0	-	1	1	½	0	6	46.50
14	Lisa Lane (USA)	½	0	0	½	0	0	1	0	½	0	½	1	0	-	1	0	1	6	42.25
15	Fenny Heemskerk (Netherlands)	0	0	1	0	0	0	0	1	½	1	½	½	0	0	-	0	1	5½	40.50
16	Elfriede Rinder (West Germany)	0	0	0	0	0	0	½	0	0	0	½	1	½	1	1	-	1	5½	31.00
17	Sandagdorj Handsuren (Mongolia)	0	0	0	0	½	0	0	0	0	0	½	½	1	0	0	0	-	2½	

== 1962 Championship Match ==
The championship match was played in Moscow in 1962. A 21-year-old Gaprindashvili crushed the defending champion Bykova by 9–2, not losing a single game, to become the fifth - and by far youngest - Women's World Champion.

Women's World Championship Match 1962
	1	2	3	4	5	6	7	8	9	10	11	Total
Elisaveta Bykova (Soviet Union)	½	0	0	0	½	0	0	½	½	0	0	2
Nona Gaprindashvili (Soviet Union)	½	1	1	1	½	1	1	½	½	1	1	9
