= Hansruedi Glauser =

Swiss chess player (1945–2014)

Personal information
- Born: 28 June 1945
- Died: 22 January 2014 (aged 68)

Chess career
- Country: Switzerland
- Title: FIDE Master (1989); Senior International Correspondence Chess Master (2011)
- FIDE rating: 2375 (July 1983)
- ICCF rating: 2511 (January 2014)

Hansruedi Glauser (28 June 1945 – 22 January 2014) was a Swiss chess player who held the FIDE title of FIDE Master (FM). He was a Swiss Chess Championship medalist (1966, 1967) and Clare Benedict Cup winner (1969).

== Biography ==
In the 1960s, Hansruedi Glauser was one of the leading junior Swiss chess players. In 1962, he won the Swiss Junior Chess Championship. In 1963, in Vrnjačka Banja, Hansruedi Glauser participated in the 7th World Junior Chess Championship and ranked 26th. In 1964, in Groningen, he ranked 5th in the 3rd Niemeyer international chess tournament. Hansruedi Glauser won the Coupe-Suisse final five times: 1963, 1966, 1969, 1970, and 1971. He also often participated in Swiss Chess Championships, where his best results are shared 2nd place in 1966 and shared 3rd place in 1967.

Hansruedi Glauser played for Switzerland in the Chess Olympiads:

- in 1966, at the first reserve board in the 17th Chess Olympiad in Havana (+7, =7, -4),
- in 1968, at the second reserve board in the 18th Chess Olympiad in Lugano (+6, =4, -3).

Hansruedi Glauser played for Switzerland in the European Team Chess Championship:

- in 1973, at the eighth board in the 5th European Team Chess Championship in Bath (+1, =2, -3).

Hansruedi Glauser played for Switzerland in the World Student Team Chess Championships:

- in 1968, at the first board in the 15th World Student Team Chess Championship in Ybbs (+6, =5, -1),
- in 1970, at the second board in the 17th World Student Team Chess Championship in Haifa (+2, =5, -2).

Hansruedi Glauser played for Switzerland in the Clare Benedict Cups:

- in 1967, at the third board in the 14th Clare Benedict Cup in Leysin (+2, =1, -2),
- in 1968, at the third board in the 15th Clare Benedict Cup in Bad Aibling (+0, =4, -0),
- in 1969, at the reserve board in the 16th Clare Benedict Cup in Adelboden (+2, =1, -1), winning team silver and individual gold medals,
- in 1970, at the second board in the 17th Clare Benedict Cup in Paignton (+0, =2, -2).

In later years, due to his busy work schedule, Hansruedi Glauser participated mainly in correspondence chess tournaments. He became a Senior International Correspondence Chess Master (SIM) in 2011.
