= Abdul-Razzaq Ahmed Taha =

Abdul-Razzaq Ahmed Taha (Arabic: عبد الرزاق أحمد طه; died aged 88) was an Iraqi chess player and former president of the Iraqi Chess Federation.

He represented the Iraqi national team in the Chess Olympiad on three occasions, 1972 in Skopje, 1974 in Nice and 1984 in Thessaloniki. In the 1972 Olympiad he played the top board for Iraq which eventually finished second last, Taha scoring 4 wins, 4 draws and 9 losses. However his upset win over the grandmaster Walter Browne in the match against Australia was spectacular and became part of the chess education for all Iraqi chess players, and Simon Webb in Chess for Tigers selected this game as one of two examples of "How to trap Heffalumps", in a chapter on how to play against opponents who are considerably stronger than oneself.

== Win over Walter Browne ==
Position: h1 white rook, g1 white knight, f1 white bishop, e1 white king, a1 white queen, h2 white pawn, g2 white pawn, f2 white pawn, c2 white pawn, b2 white pawn, d4 white pawn, e5 white pawn, d5 black pawn, b5 black pawn, e6 black pawn, b6 white pawn, h7 black pawn, g7 black pawn, f7 black pawn, e7 black queen, c7 black pawn, b7 black pawn, h8 black rook, e8 black king, c8 black bishop, b8 black knight

Position after 11.Qxa1.

White: Walter Browne

Black: Abdul-Razzaq Ahmed Taha

Opening: French Defence, Classical Variation

1.e4 e6 2.d4 d5 3.Nc3 Nf6 4.Bg5 Be7 5.e5 Nfd7 6.Bxe7 Qxe7 7.Nb5 Nb6 8.a4 a6 9.a5 axb5 10.axb6 Rxa1 11.Qxa1 (diagram)

White is threatening 12.Qa8 which will win either the b8-knight or c8-bishop. Webb notes that castling is Black's main continuation. However, Taha decides to continue far more audaciously with a bold piece sacrifice.

11...c6 12.Qa8

Again, Webb notes that White has little choice but to accept the sacrifice, or else Black simply castles and will eventually win the b6-pawn. However, after White moves his queen to take the material, White has still not developed the kingside and Black prepares to attack the White king.

12...0-0 13.Qxb8 Qb4+ 14.c3 Qxb2 15.Ne2 b4 16.cxb4 Qxb4+ 17.Kd1 Qb3+ 18.Kd2 Qb4+ 19.Kd3

Browne is the stronger player, and still hoping to win the game, he (perhaps unwisely according to Webb) decides to avoid 19.Kd1 with perpetual check.

19...c5 20.Qc7 c4+ 21.Ke3 Qb3+ 22.Kf4 Qd3 23.f3 Qd2+ 24.Kg3 Qe1+ 25.Kh3 Qf2 26.Kg4 f6 27.exf6 e5+ 28.Kh5 gxf6 29.dxe5 fxe5 30.Qe7 Rf5+, White resigns

Mate will follow in a few moves
