= Tsagaan Battsetseg =

Mongolian-American chess player (born 1972)

Personal information
- Born: 30 January 1972 (age 54)

Chess career
- Country: Mongolia (until 2000); United States (since 2000)
- Title: Woman International Master (1990)
- Peak rating: 2273 (April 2005)

Tsagaan Battsetseg (born 30 January 1972) is a Mongolian–American chess player who holds the FIDE title of Woman International Master (WIM, 1990). She is an eight-time winner of the Mongolian Women's Chess Championship (1989, 1990, 1992, 1994, 1995, 1996, 1997).

== Biography ==
From the end of the 1980s to the end of the 1990s Tsagaan Battsetseg was one of the leading Mongolian female chess players. She eight times won Mongolian Women's Chess Championship: in 1989, 1990, 1992, 1994, 1995, 1996 and 1997. In 1990, Tsagaan Battsetseg participated in Women's World Chess Championship Interzonal Tournament in Azov where ranked 15th place.

Tsagaan Battsetseg played for Mongolia in the Women's Chess Olympiads:

- In 1990, at first board in the 29th Chess Olympiad (women) in Novi Sad (+8, =3, -3),
- In 1994, at first board in the 31st Chess Olympiad (women) in Moscow (+4, =5, -4).
- In 1996, at first board in the 32nd Chess Olympiad (women) in Yerevan (+6, =2, -5),
- In 1998, at first board in the 33rd Chess Olympiad (women) in Elista (+3, =4, -5).

In 1990, she was awarded the FIDE Woman International Master (WIM) title.

Since the beginning of 2000, Tsagaan Battsetseg moved to the United States. In 2009, she participated in U.S. Women's Chess Championship final.
