= George Francis Kane =

American chess player (born 1948)

Personal information
- Born: August 11, 1948 (age 78) Palo Alto, California, U.S.

Chess career
- Country: United States
- Title: FIDE Master (1997)
- Peak rating: 2330 (May 1974)

George Francis Kane (born August 11, 1948) is an American chess FIDE Master (FM) and writer.

== Biography ==
In 1972, George Francis Kane won the Marshall Chess Club Championship. overwhelmingly, gaining some 300 rating points, so many that the US Chess Federation changed the rules for awarding bonus points. In 1973, he debuted in the U.S. Chess Championship, sharing 12th and 13th place with Donald Byrne.

George Francis Kane played for the United States in the Chess Olympiad:

- in 1972, at the second reserve board in the 20th Chess Olympiad in Skopje (+2, =5, −5).

In 1974, George Francis Kane published a book for chess beginners, What's the Next Move?: A Book of Chess Tactics for Children and Other Beginners, which was the first book for children with algebraic chess notation in the United States. In 1976, he and co-author Pierre R. Schwob published another book, The Chess Tutor, Opening Moves.

George Francis Kane was active in Minnesota Atheists – the largest atheist organization in the state of Minnesota. He was secretary (1998–2005), chair (2005–2007), and president (since 2007) of the organization.
