= Jiří Lechtýnský =

Czech chess player (born 1947)

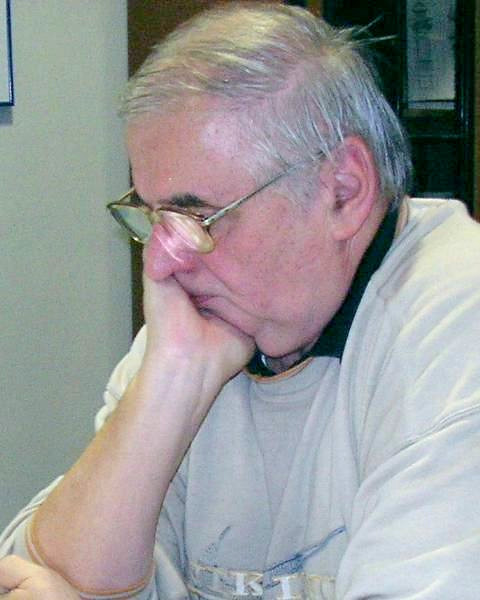
- Lechtýnský in 2010

Personal information
- Born: 25 November 1947 (age 78)

Chess career
- Country: Czechoslovakia; Czech Republic
- Title: Grandmaster (1982)
- Peak rating: 2487 (January 2005)

Jiří Lechtýnský (born 25 November 1947) is a Czech chess player who is a Grandmaster (GM) (1982). He is a Czechoslovak Chess Championship medalist (1986).

== Biography ==
From the 1970s to the 1980s, Jiří Lechtýnský was one of the leading Czechoslovak chess players. He was a multiple participant in the Czechoslovak Chess Championships, where he won bronze (1986) medal. Jiří Lechtýnský was winner of many international chess tournament awards, including first or shared first place in Děčín (1979), Halle (1981), Klatovy (1999), Augsburg (2002), Havlíčkův Brod (2004), Česká Třebová (2006). In 1974, he awarded the FIDE International Master (IM) title, but in 1982 - FIDE Grandmaster (GM) title.

Jiří Lechtýnský played for Czechoslovakia in the Chess Olympiads:

- In 1974, at second reserve board in the 21st Chess Olympiad in Nice (+5, =0, -2),
- In 1980, at second reserve board in the 24th Chess Olympiad in La Valletta (+1, =3, -0),
- In 1986, at second reserve board in the 27th Chess Olympiad in Dubai (+2, =4, -0).

Jiří Lechtýnský played for Czechoslovakia in the European Team Chess Championships:

- In 1970, at first reserve board in the 4th European Team Chess Championship in Kapfenberg (+1, =1, -2),
- In 1977, at sixth board in the 6th European Team Chess Championship in Moscow (+0, =2, -2),
- In 1980, at seventh board in the 7th European Team Chess Championship in Skara (+1, =0, -4).
