= Slobodan Martinović =

Serbian chess player

Slobodan Martinović (25 July 1945 – 10 January 2015) was a Serbian chess Grandmaster. He began in 1963, and played until his death.

== Statistics ==
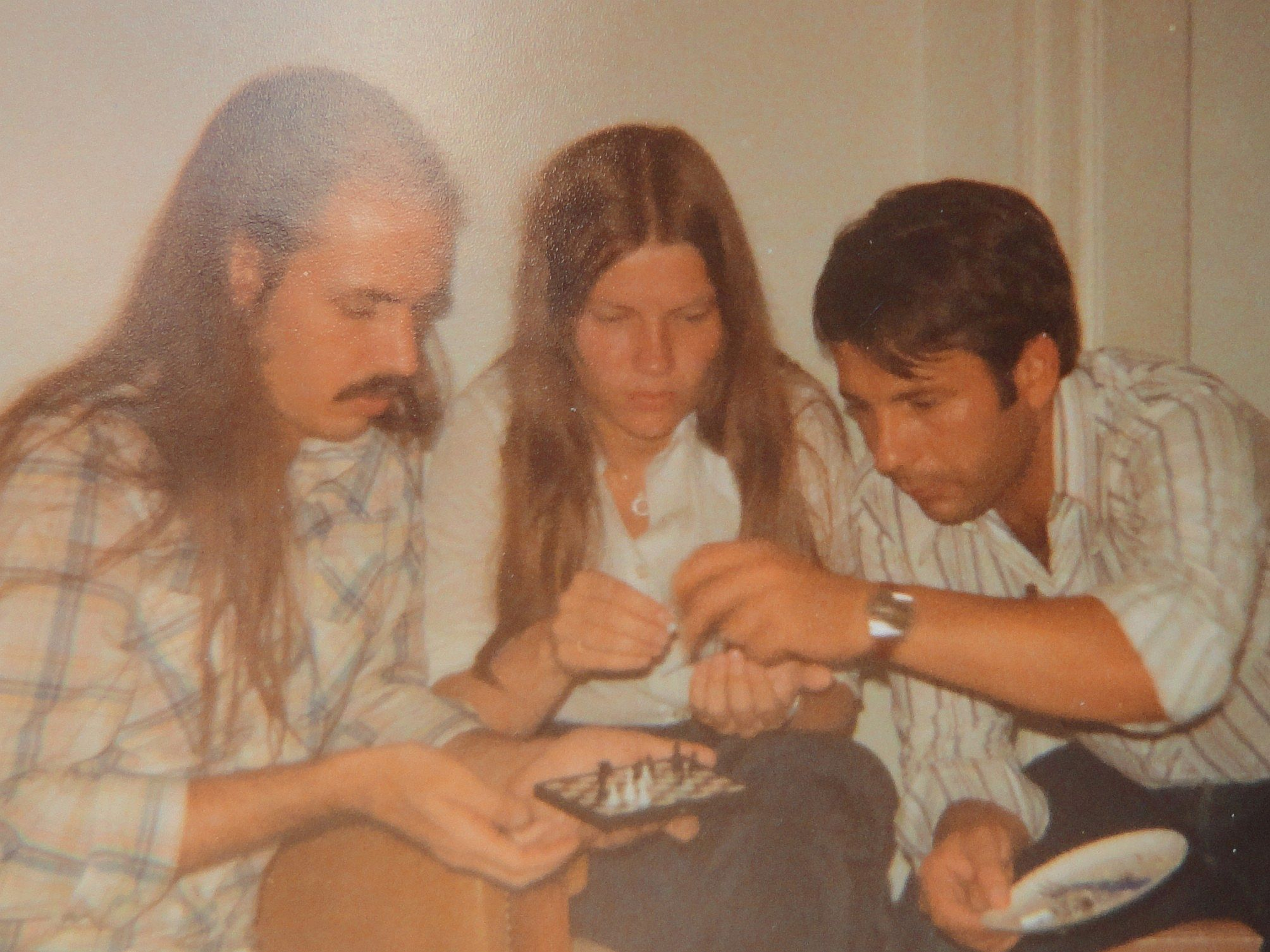
Slobodan Martinović (right), interzonal tournaments 1979 in Rio

Martinović played 269 master games that were tracked by FIDE. Of them, 83 (31%) he won, 157 (58%) were draws, and 29 (11%) he lost.

=== Ranking ===
Martinović's FIDE rating was 2447. He ranked 41 among the active players of Serbia, and 1345 among the active players of the whole world. His best rating was 2480, in October 2008.

== Games ==
Martinović played 264 master games that were recorded by FIDE.

=== Karpov ===
In 1985, Martinović drew with Anatoli Karpov in Amsterdam, using the Sicilian Defence, Scheveningen Variation. The game was 72 moves long.

== See also ==
- List of chess grandmasters
- List of chess players
