= Karl Pedersen (chess player) =

Danish chess player

Personal information
- Born: 1940 (age 85–86)

Chess career
- Country: Denmark

Karl Pedersen (born 1940), is a Danish chess player, Danish Chess Championship medalist (1967).

== Biography ==
Karl Pedersen participated many times in the finals of Danish Chess Championships and won silver medal in 1967.

Karl Pedersen played for Denmark in the Chess Olympiad:

- In 1972, at second reserve board in the 20th Chess Olympiad in Skopje (+6, =6, -3).

Karl Pedersen played for Denmark in the European Team Chess Championship:

- In 1970, at fifth board in the 4th European Team Chess Championship in Kapfenberg (+2, =2, -3).

Karl Pedersen played for Denmark in the World Student Team Chess Championship:

- In 1967, at third board in the 14th World Student Team Chess Championship in Harrachov (+1, =5, -1).

Karl Pedersen played for Denmark in the Nordic Chess Cups:

- In 1971, at first board in the 2nd Nordic Chess Cup in Großenbrode (+1, =1, -3) and won team silver medal,
- In 1972, at first board in the 3rd Nordic Chess Cup in Großenbrode (+3, =0, -1) and won team silver medal.
