= Altachey =

Altachey Алтачей
- Ulus
- Location within Republic of Buryatia Location within Russia
- Coordinates: 50°42′N 107°32′E
- Country: Russia
- Region: Republic of Buryatia
- District: Bichursky District
- Time zone: UTC+8:00

Altachey (Russian: Алтачей; Buryat: Алташа, Altasha) is a rural locality (an ulus) in Bichursky District, Republic of Buryatia, Russia. The population was 76 as of 2010. There is 1 street.

== Geography ==
Altachey is located 17 km north of Bichura (the district's administrative centre) by road. Petropavlovka is the nearest rural locality.
