= Lhamsuren Myagmarsuren =

Mongolian chess player (1938–2026)

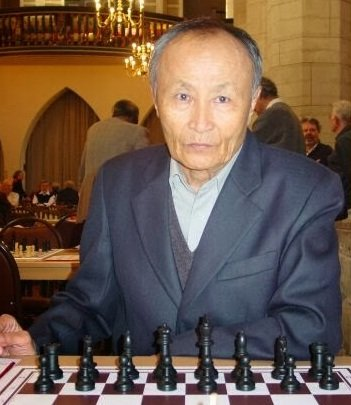

Personal information
- Born: 17 February 1938 Buyant, Khovd, Mongolia
- Died: 26 October 2026 (aged 88)

Chess career
- Country: Mongolia
- Title: International Master (1967)
- Peak rating: 2380 (July 1971)
Medal record
World Chess Olympiad
Gold medal – first place	1960 Leipzig	Individual

Lkhamsürengiin Myagmarsüren (Mongolian: Лхамсүрэнгийн Мягмарсүрэн; 17 February 1938 – 26 October 2026) was a Mongolian chess master.

== Biography ==
Myagmarsuren won the West Asian zonal tournament in 1966. and tied for 19–20th place in the Interzonal tournament in Sousse, Tunisia 1967 (Bent Larsen won).

In other international tournaments, he tied for 5–6th place at Dushanbe 1962 (Leonid Shamkovich won); took 12th place at Havana 1967 (4th Armies-ch, Vlastimil Hort won); took 16th place at Tallinn 1971 (Paul Keres and Mikhail Tal won); and tied for 8–9th place in the 10th Rubinstein Memorial at Polanica Zdrój 1972 (Jan Smejkal won).

He was a four-time Mongolian chess champion (1965, 1980, 1981, 1982). He played ten times for Mongolia in the Chess Olympiads (1960–1974 and 1980–1982), where he won an individual gold medal at the fourth board (+14 –1 =5) at Leipzig 1960.

Myagmarsuren was awarded the IM title in 1966. He still played chess and his handle on the Internet Chess Club was "Shatar".

Myagmarsuren died on 26 October 2026, at the age of 88.
