= Lothar Vogt =

German chess grandmaster (born 1952)

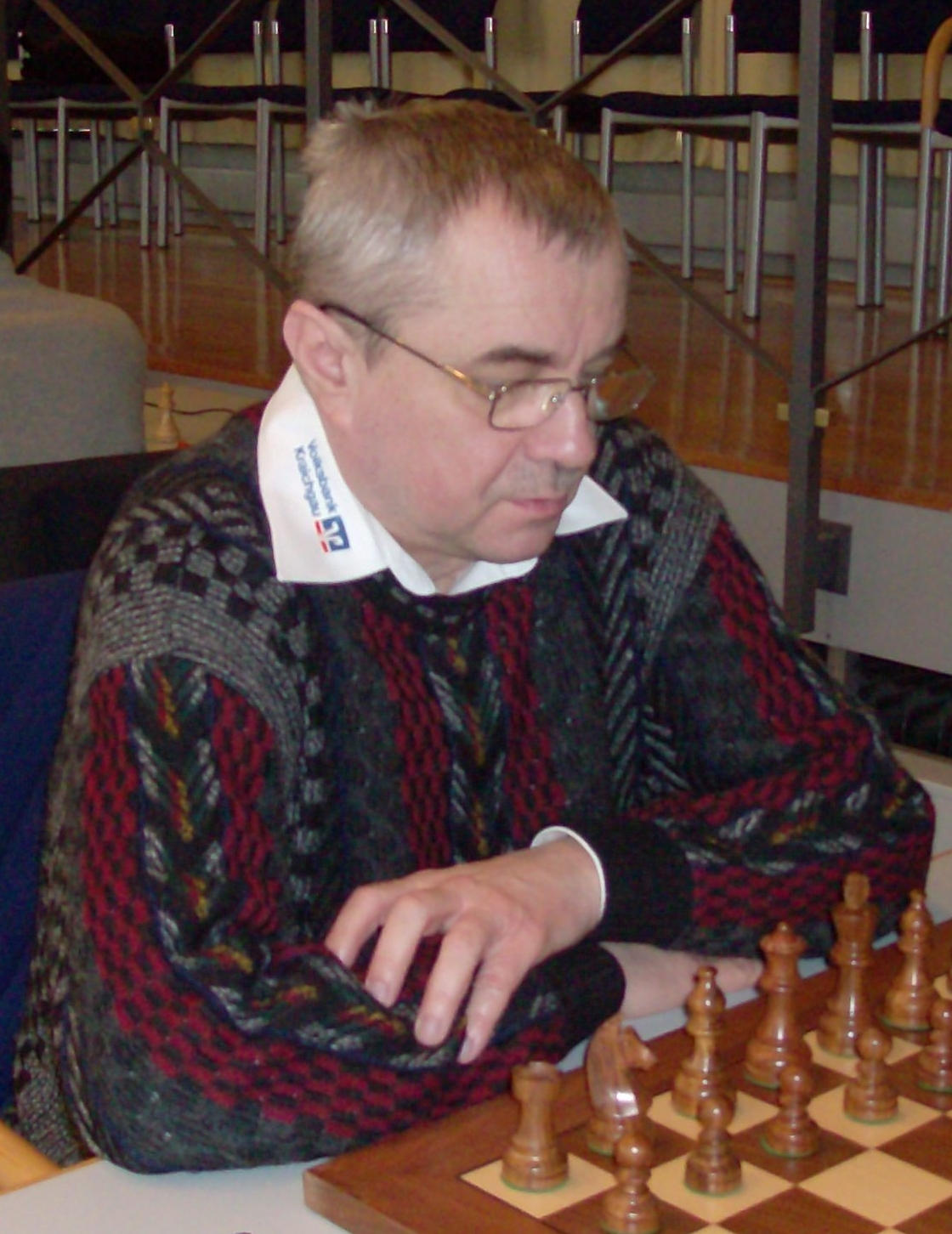
- Vogt in 2010

Personal information
- Born: 17 January 1952 (age 74) Görlitz, East Germany

Chess career
- Country: East Germany (1967-1990); Germany (1990-)
- Title: Grandmaster (1976)
- Peak rating: 2530 (July 1992)

Lothar Vogt (born 17 January 1952) is a German chess FIDE Grandmaster (GM) (1976), two-time East Germany Chess Championship winner (1977, 1979), European Team Chess Championship team bronze medal winner (1970).

== Biography ==
In 1968, Lothar Vogt won the East Germany Youth Chess Championship. In the 1970s and 1980s, he was one of the leaders in East Germany chess, winning two gold medals (Suhl in 1977 and Frankfurt in 1979) in East Germany Chess Championships.

He has appeared in many international chess tournaments, with successes including in Warsaw (1969, 1st place), Zinnowitz (1970, shared 1st-2nd place), Starý Smokovec (1972, shared 1st-2nd place and 1979, shared 1st-2nd place), Leipzig (1974, shared 1st-2nd place), Kecskemét (1977, 1st place), Nałęczów (1979, shared 1st-3rd place), Polanica-Zdrój (1982, shared 1st-2nd place in Rubinstein Memorial) and in Valby, (1991, shared 1st-4th place). In 2002, Lothar Vogt won the Open tournament in Leukerbad, while in 2006, he ranked 1st before Andrei Sokolov in Lenk.

Lothar Vogt played for East Germany in the Chess Olympiads:

- In 1972, at the second reserve board in the 20th Chess Olympiad in Skopje (+8, =7, -2),
- In 1988, at fourth board in the 28th Chess Olympiad in Thessaloniki (+6, =5, -1).

Lothar Vogt played for East Germany in the European Team Chess Championship:

- In 1970, at the tenth board in the 4th European Team Chess Championship in Kapfenberg (+0, =1, -2) and won the team bronze medal.

In 1973, he was awarded the FIDE International Master (IM) title and received the FIDE Grandmaster (GM) title three years later.
