= Tüdeviin Üitümen =

Mongolian chess player (1939–1993)

Personal information
- Born: August 27, 1939 Biger, Mongolia
- Died: 1993 (aged 53–54)

Chess career
- Country: Mongolia
- Title: International Master (1965)
Medal record
World Chess Olympiad
| Gold medal – first place | 1964 Tel Aviv | Individual |
| Silver medal – second place | 1970 Siegen | Individual |

Tüdeviin Üitümen (Mongolian: Түдэвийн Үйтүмэн, internationally often Tudev Ujtumen; born 27 August 1939 – died 1993) was a Mongolian chess master. He became Mongolia's first International Master in 1965.

In 1969, he won the West Asian Zonal tournament in Singapore. He tied for 20th-22nd in the Interzonal tournament at Palma de Mallorca 1970 (Bobby Fischer won). At that tournament, he played a draw against eleventh World Champion Fischer and grandmaster Bent Larsen, also beat grandmaster Samuel Reshevsky.

In other international tournaments, he played mainly in USSR. He took 15th at Sochi 1964 (Chigorin memorial, Nikolai Krogius won); took 15th at Sochi 1965 (Chigorin memorial, Wolfgang Unzicker and Boris Spassky won); took 9th at Havana 1967 (4th Armies-ch, Vlastimil Hort won); tied for 11-13th at Tbilisi 1971 (Goglidze memorial); and took 9th at Dubna 1973 (Mikhail Tal and Ratmir Kholmov won).

Ujtumen was a three-time winner of the Mongolian Chess Championship, in 1972, 1978 and 1986. He played six times for Mongolia in Chess Olympiads (1964–1974). He won the individual gold medal on second board (+11 −1 =5) at Tel Aviv 1964 and silver on second board (+12 −3 =3) at Siegen 1970. Also Ujtumen played a draw against tenth World Champion Boris Spassky on the seventh board at Nice 1974, however, he was unable to take any place
