= Jose Miguel (disambiguation) =

Jose Miguel may refer to:

- José Miguel Agrelot (1927–2004), Puerto Rican comedian and radio- and television host
- José Miguel Alcérreca (1845–1891), Chilean military officer
- José Miguel Alemán (born 1956), Panamanian politician
- José Miguel Antúnez (born 1967), Spanish retired ACB-, LNB-, and LPB player
- José Miguel Arenas Beltrán, real name of Valtònyc (born 1993), Spanish rapper
- Jose Miguel Arroyo (born 1946), Filipino lawyer
- José Miguel Arroyo Delgado (born 1969), Spanish bullfighter
- José Miguel Ballivian (born 1997), Chilean discus thrower
- Jose Miguel Barandiaran (1889–1991), Spanish anthropologist, ethnographer, and priest
- José Miguel Barriga Castro (1816–1886), Chilean lawyer, politician, and surveyor
- José Miguel Barros (1924–2020), Chilean lawyer, diplomat, historian, and academic
- José Miguel Battle Sr. (1929–2007), Cuban mafia leader and policeman
- José Miguel Beñaran Ordeñana (1949–1978), Spanish politician who was assassinated
- José-Miguel Bernardo (born 1950), Spanish mathematician and statistician
- José Miguel Blanco (1839–1897), Chilean sculptor, illustrator, and writer
- José Miguel Boissard (born 1978), Dominican Republic judoka
- José Miguel Bonetti (born 1938), Dominican Republic businessman
- José Miguel Cabrera Torres (born 1983), Venezuelan former MLB player
- José Miguel Cáceres (born 1981), Dominican Republic volleyball player
- José Miguel Campos (born 1966), Spanish retired footballer
- José Miguel Carrera (1785–1821), Chilean general
- José Miguel Castro (born 1974), Chilean politician
- José Miguel Class (1935–2017), Puerto Rican singer
- José Miguel Contreras, Canadian member of indie rock band By Divine Right
- José Miguel Corrales Bolaños (born 1938), Costa Rican politician
- José Miguel Covarrubias Duclaud, alternate name of Miguel Covarrubias (1904–1957), Mexican painter, caricaturist, illustrator, ethnologist, and art historian
- José Miguel Cubero (born 1987), Costa Rican former professional footballer
- Jose Miguel de Arciniega (1793–1849), Mexican military explorer and legislator
- José Miguel de Carvajal-Vargas, 2nd Duke of San Carlos (1771–1828), Peruvian-born Spanish duke
- José Miguel de la Cueva, 14th Duke of Alburquerque (1775–1811), Spanish aristocrat, diplomat, and senior officer in the Peninsular War
- José Miguel de Velasco (1795–1859), Bolivian military officer and statesman
- José Miguel Díaz Vélez (1770–1833), Argentine patriot and general
- José Miguel Domínguez Alemán (1756–1830), New Spanish colonial official
- José Miguel Echavarri (born 1947), Spanish former racing cyclist
- José Miguel Elías (born 1977), Spanish former professional road cyclist
- José Miguel Espinosa (1945–2024), Spanish freestyle swimmer
- José Miguel Falcón, American politician
- José Miguel Fernández (born 1988), Cuban MLB player
- José Miguel Fernández de Liencres (1898–1975), Spanish tennis player
- José Miguel Gallardo (1897–1976), Puerto Rican politician and professor
- José Miguel Gambra Gutiérrez (born 1950), Spanish philosopher and politician
- José Miguel Gaona (born 1957), Belgium-born Spanish physician, psychiatrist, and writer
- José Miguel García, several people
- José Miguel Gil (born 1971), Spanish diver
- José Miguel Gómez (1858–1921), Cuban politician and revolutionary
- José Miguel Gómez Rodríguez (born 1961), Colombian Roman Catholic clergyman and metropolitan archbishop
- José Miguel González, several people
- José Miguel Granadino (born 1988), Salvadoran former footballer
- José Miguel Guridi y Alcocer (1763–1828), Spanish-Mexican politician
- José Miguel Guzman (born 1956), Dominican Republic weightlifter
- José Miguel Huacuja (born 1950), Mexican former field hockey player
- José Miguel Infante (1778–1844), Chilean statesman and political figure
- José Miguel Insulza (born 1943), Chilean politician, lawyer, and academic
- José Miguel Martínez Hernández, Cuban dissident
- José Miguel Minhonha (born 1966), Angolan footballer
- José Miguel Miyar Barruecos (born 1932), Cuban politician and medical doctor
- José Miguel Morales (born 1976), Spanish former professional footballer
- José Miguel Moreno (born 1946), Spanish specialist of historical plucked string instruments
- José Miguel Noguera (1913–1954), Argentine footballer
- José Miguel Organista Simões Aguiar (born 1981), Portuguese former footballer
- José Miguel Ortíz (born 1941), Chilean politician
- José Miguel Oviedo (1934–2019), Peruvian writer and literary critic
- José Miguel Pérez, several people
- José Miguel Pey (1763–1838), Colombian statesman and soldier
- José Miguel Prieto (born 1971), Spanish former footballer
- José Miguel Reyes (born 1992), Venezuelan international footballer
- José Miguel Ribeiro (born 1966), Portuguese film director
- José Miguel Ridameya Tatche (1929–2015), Spanish chess player
- José Miguel Rodríguez Espinosa, Spanish astronomer
- José Miguel Rovira (1913–1993), Puerto Rican industrialist
- José-Miguel Ullán (1944–2009), Spanish television journalist, writer, and poet
- José Miguel Valdés (1837–1898), Chilean political figure, politician, and minister
- José Miguel Varas (1928–2011), Chilean writer
- José Miguel Vega Rodríguez (1913–1992), Spanish military officer
- José Miguel Velásquez (born 1967), Venezuelan-born American composer, music producer, and vocal coach
- José Miguel Vilar-Bou (born 1979), Spanish contemporary novelist, short story writer, and journalist
- José Miguel Villaú (born 1971), Spanish rugby union player
- José Miguel Viñuela (born 1974), Chilean television presenter and radio host
- José Miguel Vivanco (born 1961), Chilean human rights lawyer and former executive director
- José Miguel Wisnik (born 1948), Brazilian composer, musician, and essayist
- José Miguel Zúñiga (born 1962), Spanish former footballer

== See also ==
- José Miguel Agrelot Coliseum
- José Miguel de Velasco Province
- José Miguel Gallardo School
