= Sederberg =

Sederberg is a surname. Notable people with the surname include:

- Arelo C. Sederberg (1930–2020), American financial journalist, television commentator, public relations executive, and novelist
- Thomas Sederberg, American computer graphics researcher and academic administrator

== See also ==
- Söderberg
