= 15th Chess Olympiad =

1962 chess tournament in Varna, Bulgaria

The official poster of the Olympiad.

The 15th Chess Olympiad (Bulgarian: 15-ата Шахматна олимпиада, 15-ata Shahmatna olimpiada), organized by FIDE and comprising a team tournament, took place between September 15 and October 10, 1962, in Varna, Bulgaria.

The Soviet team with six grandmasters, led by world champion Botvinnik, lived up to expectations and won their sixth consecutive gold medals, with Yugoslavia and Argentina taking the silver and bronze, respectively.

== Results ==
=== Preliminaries ===
A total of 37 teams entered the competition and were divided into four preliminary groups of eight to ten teams each. The top three from each group advanced to Final A, the teams placed 4th-6th to Final B, and the rest to Final C, where they were joined by a Bulgarian "B" team that played outside the contest. All preliminary groups as well as Finals A and B were played as round-robin tournaments, while Final C with 14 teams was played as an 11-round Swiss system tournament.

The Soviet Union took first place in group 1, well ahead of the two German teams, East with half a point more than West. Sweden, Belgium, and Spain took the places 4–6, while Norway, Turkey, and Greece finished at the bottom of the group.

Group 2 was won by the United States, while the Bulgarian hosts and Romania were tied for second place. Israel, Mongolia, and Switzerland made up the middle part of the group, while Puerto Rico and Tunisia had to settle for Final C.

Yugoslavia clinched group 3, ahead of the Netherlands and Czechoslovakia. Poland, Iceland, and Finland had to settle for Final B. Meanwhile, France, Uruguay, Luxembourg, and Cyprus finished at the bottom of the group.

Group 4 was won by Argentina, ahead of Hungary and Austria. Denmark, Cuba, and England made up the middle part of the group, while Albania, India, Iran, and Ireland completed the field.

- Group 1:

Final	Country	1	2	3	4	5	6	7	8	9	+	−	=	Points
«A»	Soviet Union	-	3	3½	3	3	4	3	4	4	8	0	0	27½
«A»	East Germany	1	-	2	2½	2½	2½	3½	3½	4	6	1	1	21½
«A»	West Germany	½	2	-	2½	3	2½	2½	4	4	6	1	1	21
«B»	Sweden	1	1½	1½	-	2	3	3	2½	2½	4	3	1	17
«B»	Belgium	1	1½	1	2	-	2½	2	2½	3½	3	3	2	16
«B»	Spain	0	1½	1½	1	1½	-	2½	4	4	3	5	0	16
«C»	Norway	1	½	1½	1	2	1½	-	3	2½	2	5	1	13
«C»	Turkey	0	½	0	1½	1½	0	1	-	3	1	7	0	7½
«C»	Greece	0	0	0	1½	½	0	1½	1	-	0	8	0	4½

- Group 2:

Final	Country	1	2	3	4	5	6	7	8	+	−	=	Points
«A»	United States	-	2	2½	3½	4	4	4	4	6	0	1	24
«A»	Bulgaria	2	-	2	3½	3½	3	3	3	5	0	2	20
«A»	Romania	1½	2	-	2	3½	4	3½	3½	4	1	2	20
«B»	Israel	½	½	2	-	3	1½	2½	3	3	3	1	13
«B»	Mongolia	0	½	½	1	-	3	3½	2½	3	4	0	11
«B»	Switzerland	0	1	0	2½	1	-	3	2½	3	4	0	10
«C»	Puerto Rico	0	1	½	1½	½	1	-	3	1	6	0	7½
«C»	Tunisia	0	1	½	1	1½	1½	1	-	0	7	0	6½

- Group 3:

Final	Country	1	2	3	4	5	6	7	8	9	10	+	−	=	Points
«A»	Yugoslavia	-	2	2½	2½	3	2½	3	4	4	4	8	0	1	27½
«A»	Netherlands	2	-	2	4	2½	1½	3	3½	2½	4	6	1	2	25
«A»	Czechoslovakia	1½	2	-	2½	1½	2½	3½	3½	4	4	6	2	1	25
«B»	Poland	1½	0	1½	-	2½	4	3½	4	4	4	6	3	0	25
«B»	Iceland	1	1½	2½	1½	-	2	2½	3½	2½	4	5	3	1	21
«B»	Finland	1½	2½	1½	0	2	-	2½	1½	4	4	4	4	1	19½
«C»	France	1	1	½	½	1½	1½	-	3½	4	3½	3	6	0	17
«C»	Uruguay	0	½	½	0	½	2½	½	-	3½	4	3	6	0	12
«C»	Luxembourg	0	1½	0	0	1½	0	0	½	-	3	1	8	0	6½
«C»	Cyprus	0	0	0	0	0	0	½	0	1	-	0	9	0	1½

- Group 4:

Final	Country	1	2	3	4	5	6	7	8	9	10	+	−	=	Points
«A»	Argentina	-	2	3½	2½	3	3½	4	3	4	4	8	0	1	29½
«A»	Hungary	2	-	3	3	2½	3	4	3	3½	4	8	0	1	28
«A»	Austria	½	1	-	2½	2½	2	3	3	3	3½	6	2	1	21
«B»	Denmark	1½	1	1½	-	1½	2½	2½	2½	3½	3	5	4	0	19½
«B»	Cuba	1	1½	1½	2½	-	2½	2½	2½	2	3	5	3	1	19
«B»	England	½	1	2	1½	1½	-	2	4	3	3½	3	4	2	19
«C»	Albania	0	0	1	1½	1½	2	-	2½	3	3	3	5	1	14½
«C»	India	1	1	1	1½	1½	0	1½	-	4	3	2	7	0	14½
«C»	Iran	0	½	1	½	2	1	1	0	-	2½	1	7	1	8½
«C»	Ireland	0	0	½	1	1	½	1	1	1½	-	0	9	0	6½

=== Final ===
Final A
#	Country	Players	Points	MP
1	Soviet Union	Botvinnik, Petrosian, Spassky, Keres, Geller, Tal	31½	
2	Yugoslavia	Gligorić, Trifunović, Matanović, Ivkov, Parma, Minić	28	
3	Argentina	Najdorf, Bolbochán, Panno, Sanguineti, Rossetto, Foguelman	26	
4	United States	Fischer, Benko, Evans, R. Byrne, D. Byrne, Mednis	25	
5	Hungary	Portisch, Szabó, Bilek, Barcza, Lengyel, Honfi	23	
6	Bulgaria	Padevsky, Tringov, Minev, Kolarov, Milev, Popov	21½	
7	West Germany	Unzicker, Darga, Schmid, Tröger, Hecht, Mohrlok	21	
8	East Germany	Uhlmann, Pietzsch, Malich, Zinn, Fuchs, Liebert	20½	10
9	Romania	Ciocâltea, Ghițescu, Gheorghiu, Soós, Radovici, Günsberger	20½	9
10	Czechoslovakia	Filip, Pachman, Hort, Fichtl, Blatný, Trapl	18½	
11	Netherlands	Euwe, Donner, Bouwmeester, Langeweg, Prins, Kramer	18	
12	Austria	Robatsch, Dückstein, Beni, Gragger, Kinzel, Lokvenc	10½	

Final B
#	Country	Players	Points	MP	MW	HTH
13	Spain	Pomar, del Corral, Puig Pulido, Franco Raymundo, Ridameya Tatche, Serra Olives	26½	16		
14	England	Penrose, Clarke, Golombek, Littlewood, Barden, Wade	26½	14		
15	Israel	Porat, Aloni, Czerniak, Kraidman, Domnitz, Szapiro	25			
16	Cuba	Jiménez, Cobo Arteaga, García, Ortega, Calero	22½	12		
17	Sweden	Johansson, Sköld, Nilsson, Buskenström, Olsson, Söderborg	22½	11	4	2½
18	Poland	Śliwa, Balcerowski, Doda, Tarnowski, Schmidt, Filipowicz	22½	11	4	1½
19	Belgium	O'Kelly, Dunkelblum, Limbos, Boey, De Rijcke	22			
20	Finland	Ojanen, Raisa, Rantanen, Niemelä, Westerinen, Fred	20½			
21	Mongolia	Purevzhav, Möömöö, Myagmarsuren, Chalkhasuren, Tsagan T., Namzhil	20	9	3	
22	Switzerland	Blau, Castagna, Roth, Gebauer, Luginbühl	20	9	2	
23	Iceland	Ólafsson, Guðmundsson, Pálsson, Thorsteinsson, Torvaldsson, Kristinsson	19			
24	Denmark	Kølvig, Holm, From, Søby, Korning, Brinck-Claussen	17			

Final C
#	Country	Players	Points	MP
25	Norway	Johannessen, Lindblom, Hoen, Vinje-Gulbrandsen, Zwaig, Stensholt	32½	
-	Bulgaria "B"	Filipov, Karastoichev, Daskalov, Bogdanov, Chipev, Burkhanlarsky	29½	
26	Albania	Pustina, Duraku, Konçi, Veizaj, Siliqi, Omari	28½	17
27	Tunisia	Belkadi, Lagha, Kchouk, Kahia, Mohsen, Ennigrou	28½	16
28	India	Aaron, Sakhalkar, Ali, Hassan, Nawab, Shukla	26½	
29	Iran	Hemmasian, Farboud, Parniani, Safvat, Zandifar	25	
30	France	Boutteville, Bergraser, Thiellement, Noradounguian, Ferry, Ravinet P.	23½	
31	Puerto Rico	Colón Romero A., Rivera D., Navas, Reissmann, Colón Romero M., Prieto Azúar, Rabell Méndez	22½	
32	Uruguay	Estrada Degrandi, Etcheverry, Alvarez del Monte, Bauzá, Silva Nazzari	22	
33	Greece	Kokkoris, Anastasopoulos, Papapostolou, Vizantiadis, Paidousis, Hadziotis	18½	
34	Luxembourg	Conrady, Philippe, Schneider, Zeyen, Aloyse Neu, Leners	18	
35	Turkey	Süer, Boysan, Akakinci, Günsav	17	
36	Ireland	Reid, Murphy P., Reilly, Loughrey, O'Hare, Cassidy	14½	
37	Cyprus	Kleopas, Lantsias, Ioannidis, Fieros	1½	

=== Final «A» ===
№	Country	1	2	3	4	5	6	7	8	9	10	11	12	+	−	=	Points
1	Soviet Union	-	2½	2½	2½	2½	2½	3½	2½	2	3½	3½	4	10	0	1	31½
2	Yugoslavia	1½	-	2	3	2½	2½	2½	3½	2	3	2½	3	8	1	2	28
3	Argentina	1½	2	-	1	2½	3	2½	1½	3	2	3	4	6	3	2	26
4	United States	1½	1	3	-	2	2½	3½	2	2½	2½	2½	2	6	2	3	25
5	Hungary	1½	1½	1½	2	-	2	3½	2	2	2½	1½	3	3	4	4	23
6	Bulgaria	1½	1½	1	1½	2	-	2	2½	3	2	2	2½	3	4	4	21½
7	West Germany	½	1½	1½	½	½	2	-	2½	3½	2	3½	3	4	5	2	21
8	East Germany	1½	½	2½	2	2	1½	1½	-	2½	2½	1	3	4	5	2	20½
9	Romania	2	2	1	1½	2	1	½	1½	-	2½	3	3½	3	5	3	20½
10	Czechoslovakia	½	1	2	1½	1½	2	2	1½	1½	-	2	3	1	6	4	18½
11	Netherlands	½	1½	1	1½	2½	2	½	3	1	2	-	2½	3	6	2	18
12	Austria	0	1	0	2	1	1½	1	1	½	1	1½	-	0	10	1	10½

=== Final «B» ===
№	Country	13	14	15	16	17	18	19	20	21	22	23	24	+	−	=	Points
13	Spain	-	½	3	3	2½	3	1½	3	2½	2	3½	2	7	2	2	26½
14	England	3½	-	2½	1½	2½	1½	1½	3½	2½	2	2	3½	6	3	2	26½
15	Israel	1	1½	-	1½	2	3½	2½	3	1	2½	3½	3	6	4	1	25
16	Cuba	1	2½	2½	-	1½	2	1	2	2	2½	2	3½	4	3	4	22½
17	Sweden	1½	1½	2	2½	-	2½	2	2	1	1½	3	3	4	4	3	22½
18	Poland	1	2½	½	2	1½	-	3	2	4	2½	2	1½	4	4	3	22½
19	Belgium	2½	2½	1½	3	2	1	-	2½	1½	1½	1	3	5	5	1	22
20	Finland	1	½	1	2	2	2	1½	-	2½	3½	2½	2	3	4	4	20½
21	Mongolia	1½	1½	3	2	3	0	2½	1½	-	2	2	1	3	5	3	20
22	Switzerland	2	2	1½	1½	2½	1½	2½	½	2	-	2	2	2	4	5	20
23	Iceland	½	2	½	2	1	2	3	1½	2	2	-	2½	2	4	5	19
24	Denmark	2	½	1	½	1	2½	1	2	3	2	1½	-	2	6	3	17

=== Final «C» ===
№	Country	1	2	3	4	5	6	7	8	9	10	11	+	−	=	Points
25	Norway	4	3	2	2½	2½	3½	2½	2	3	4	3½	9	0	2	32½
25	Norway	33	34	27	26	#	30	31	36	28	35	32	9	0	2	32½
#	Bulgaria 2	2½	2	2½	3½	1½	3	2	4	2½	2	4	7	1	3	29½
#	Bulgaria 2	32	26	31	33	25	27	28	36	30	29	37	7	1	3	29½
26	Albania	2½	2	3½	1½	3	2	3	2½	3½	2	3	7	1	3	28½
26	Albania	29	#	34	25	27	28	32	31	35	36	33	7	1	3	28½
27	Tunisia	3	3	2	2½	1	1	4	2	4	3½	2½	7	2	2	28½
27	Tunisia	36	31	25	29	26	#	37	28	33	34	30	7	2	2	28½
28	India	2	2	1	3½	3½	2	2	2	1	4	3½	4	2	5	26½
28	India	30	29	32	34	35	26	#	27	25	37	36	4	2	5	26½
29	Iran	1½	2	3½	1½	1½	3½	2½	2	1½	2	3½	4	4	3	25
29	Iran	26	28	35	27	32	37	36	25	34	#	31	4	4	3	25
30	France	2	2	1	3½	3½	½	1½	4	1½	2½	1½	4	5	2	23½
30	France	28	32	33	36	34	25	35	37	#	31	27	4	5	2	23½
31	Puerto Rico	3	1	1½	2	4	3½	1½	1½	2½	1½	½	4	6	1	22½
31	Puerto Rico	35	27	#	32	37	33	25	26	36	30	29	4	6	1	22½
32	Uruguay	1½	2	3	2	2½	2	1	2½	4	1	½	4	4	3	22
32	Uruguay	#	30	28	31	29	35	26	34	37	33	25	4	4	3	22
33	Greece	0	4	3	½	2	½	2½	2	0	3	1	4	5	2	18½
33	Greece	25	37	30	#	36	31	34	35	27	32	26	4	5	2	18½
34	Luxembourg	4	1	½	½	½	3	1½	1½	2½	½	2½	4	7	0	18
34	Luxembourg	37	25	26	28	30	36	33	32	29	27	35	4	7	0	18
35	Turkey	1	2½	½	4	½	2	2½	2	½	0	1½	3	6	2	17
35	Turkey	31	36	29	37	28	32	30	33	26	25	34	3	6	2	17
36	Ireland	1	1½	3	½	2	1	1½	0	1½	2	½	1	8	2	14½
36	Ireland	27	35	37	30	33	34	29	#	31	26	28	1	8	2	14½
37	Cyprus	0	0	1	0	0	½	0	0	0	0	0	0	11	0	1½
37	Cyprus	34	33	36	35	31	29	27	30	32	28	#	0	11	0	1½

=== Individual medals ===
- Board 1: (Iceland) Friðrik Ólafsson 14 / 18 = 77.8%
- Board 2: (Soviet Union) Tigran Petrosian 10 / 12 = 83.3%
- Board 3: (Soviet Union) Boris Spassky 11 / 14 = 78.6%
- Board 4: (Socialist Federal Republic of Yugoslavia) Borislav Ivkov and (Argentina) Raúl Sanguineti 13½ / 16 = 84.4%
- 1st reserve: (Soviet Union) Efim Geller 10½ / 12 = 87.5%
- 2nd reserve: (Soviet Union) Mikhail Tal 10 / 13 = 76.9%

At the other end of the spectrum, Milton Ioannidis of Cyprus lost all of his 20 games, the worst score ever of any player at any Olympiad.
