= Fleurquin =

Fleurquin is a surname. Notable people with the surname include:

- Andrés Fleurquin (born 1975), retired Uruguayan footballer
- Carlos Hounié Fleurquin (1906–1962), Uruguayan chess master
- Pierre Fleurquin (1901–1972), French aviator and General, Founder of what became the Patrouille de France.
