= 14th Chess Olympiad =

1960 chess tournament in Leipzig, East Germany

The official poster of the Olympiad

The 14th Chess Olympiad (German: Die 14. Schacholympiade), organized by FIDE and comprising a team tournament, took place between October 26 and November 9, 1960, in Leipzig, East Germany.

The Soviet team with six grandmasters, led by world champion Mikhail Tal, lived up to expectations and won their fifth consecutive gold medals, with the United States and Yugoslavia taking the silver and bronze, respectively. In a reversal of fortune from the previous Olympiad, the East German hosts finished 9th, right behind rivals West Germany. Unlike the last time, however, the match between the two was a tight affair that ended in a 2–2 draw.

== Results ==
=== Preliminaries ===
A total of 40 teams entered the competition and were divided into four preliminary groups of 10 teams each. The top three from each group advanced to Final A, the teams placed 4th–6th to Final B, and the rest to Final C. All preliminary groups as well as Finals A and B were played as round-robin tournaments, while Final C with 16 teams was played as an 11-round Swiss system tournament.

Group 1 was won by Bulgaria, ahead of Yugoslavia and the host nation. Norway, Finland, and Israel took the places 4–6, while Indonesia, France, Albania, and Malta finished at the bottom of the group.

The Soviet Union took first place in group 2, well ahead of Argentina and the Netherlands. Poland, Austria, and India made up the middle part of the group, while Portugal, the Philippines, Italy, and Monaco had to settle for the bottom.

Group 3 was won by England, ahead of Czechoslovakia and Hungary. The three Nordic nations Sweden, Denmark, and Iceland had to settle for Final B. Meanwhile, Mongolia, Tunisia, Greece, and Bolivia finished at the bottom of the group.

The United States clinched group 4, ahead of West Germany and Romania. Spain, Chile, and Cuba made up the middle part of the group, while Belgium, Ecuador, Ireland, and Lebanon completed the field.

- Group 1:

Final	Country	1	2	3	4	5	6	7	8	9	10	+	−	=	Points
«A»	Bulgaria	-	2	2	3	3½	2½	3	3½	4	3½	7	0	2	27
«A»	Yugoslavia	2	-	2	2	3	2	3	4	4	4	5	0	4	26
«A»	East Germany	2	2	-	2½	3½	3	2	3	4	3	6	0	3	25
«B»	Norway	1	2	1½	-	1	2	2	4	3	4	3	3	3	20½
«B»	Finland	½	1	½	3	-	2½	2½	3	2½	4	6	3	0	19½
«B»	Israel	1½	2	1	2	1½	-	1½	2½	3	4	3	4	2	19
«C»	Indonesia	1	1	2	2	1½	2½	-	1½	3	4	3	4	2	18½
«C»	France	½	0	1	0	1	1½	2½	-	1	3½	2	7	0	11
«C»	Albania	0	0	0	1	1½	1	1	3	-	3	2	7	0	10½
«C»	Malta	½	0	1	0	0	0	0	½	1	-	0	9	0	3

- Group 2:

Final	Country	1	2	3	4	5	6	7	8	9	10	+	−	=	Points
«A»	Soviet Union	-	3½	3	3½	3½	4	3½	3	4	4	9	0	0	32
«A»	Argentina	½	-	3½	3	1½	2	3½	3	4	4	6	2	1	25
«A»	Netherlands	1	½	-	1½	3½	2½	3½	3½	3½	4	6	3	0	23½
«B»	Poland	½	1	2½	-	2½	3½	3	3	2	3½	6	2	1	21½
«B»	Austria	½	2½	½	1½	-	3½	2	1	3½	4	4	4	1	19
«B»	India	0	2	1½	½	½	-	2½	2½	2	4	3	4	2	15½
«C»	Portugal	½	½	½	1	2	1½	-	3	2	3½	2	5	2	14½
«C»	Philippines	1	1	½	1	3	1½	1	-	2½	2	2	6	1	13½
«C»	Italy	0	0	½	2	½	2	2	1½	-	3½	1	5	3	12
«C»	Monaco	0	0	0	½	0	0	½	2	½	-	0	8	1	3½

- Group 3:

Final	Country	1	2	3	4	5	6	7	8	9	10	+	−	=	Points
«A»	England	-	2½	1½	2	3½	3½	3	4	4	4	7	1	1	28
«A»	Czechoslovakia	1½	-	2	4	3½	3½	2½	3½	3½	4	7	1	1	28
«A»	Hungary	2½	2	-	3	2½	3½	3	3	3½	4	8	0	1	27
«B»	Sweden	2	0	1	-	2	3½	3½	4	3	4	5	2	2	23
«B»	Denmark	½	½	1½	2	-	1½	3½	0	3	4	3	5	1	16½
«B»	Iceland	½	½	½	½	2½	-	2½	3	3	3	5	4	0	16
«C»	Mongolia	1	1½	1	½	½	1½	-	3	3½	3	3	6	0	15½
«C»	Tunisia	0	½	1	0	4	1	1	-	2½	4	3	6	0	14
«C»	Greece	0	½	½	1	1	1	½	1½	-	1	0	0	9	7
«C»	Bolivia	0	0	0	0	0	1	1	0	3	-	1	8	0	5

- Group 4:

Final	Country	1	2	3	4	5	6	7	8	9	10	+	−	=	Points
«A»	United States	-	2½	3	2½	4	3	3½	2½	4	4	9	0	0	29
«A»	West Germany	1½	-	1½	2	3	3	2½	4	4	4	6	2	1	25½
«A»	Romania	1	2½	-	2	1	3	2½	4	4	4	6	2	1	24
«B»	Spain	1½	2	2	-	2	3	2	4	3½	3½	4	1	4	23½
«B»	Chile	0	1	3	2	-	2½	2½	3½	3½	4	6	2	1	22
«B»	Cuba	1	1	1	1	1½	-	3	2½	4	4	4	5	0	19
«C»	Belgium	½	1½	1½	2	1½	1	-	2	3	4	2	5	2	17
«C»	Ecuador	1½	0	0	0	½	1½	2	-	3½	3	2	6	1	12
«C»	Ireland	0	0	0	½	½	0	1	½	-	3½	1	8	0	6
«C»	Lebanon	0	0	0	½	0	0	0	1	½	-	0	9	0	2

=== Final ===
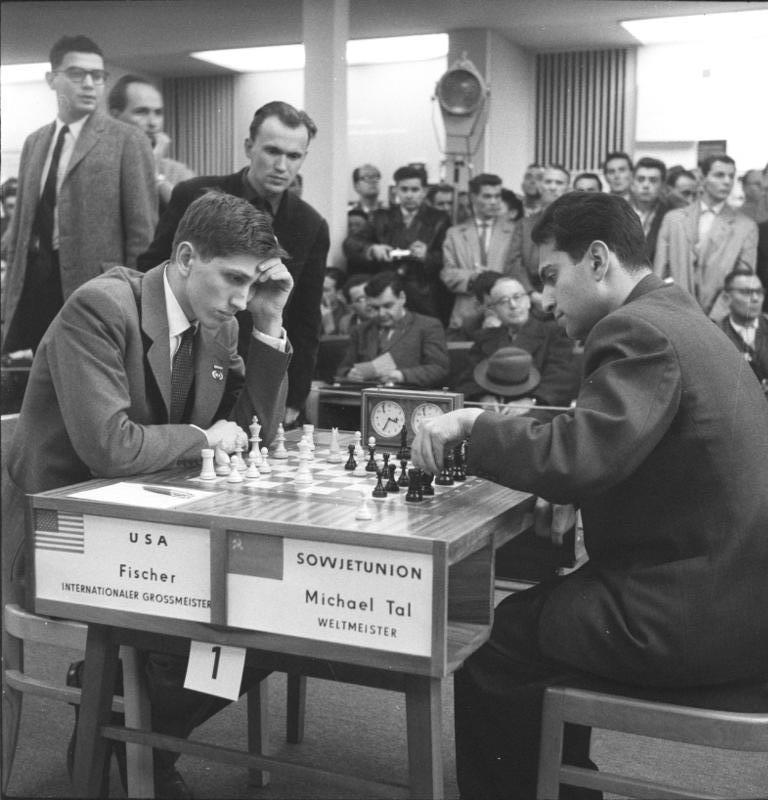
Bobby Fischer and Mikhail Tal at the Olympiad

Final A
#	Country	Players	Points	MP
1	Soviet Union	Tal, Botvinnik, Keres, Korchnoi, Smyslov, Petrosian	34	
2	United States	Fischer, Lombardy, Byrne, Bisguier, Rossolimo, Weinstein	29	
3	Yugoslavia	Gligorić, Matanović, Ivkov, Bertok, Damjanović, Vukčević	27	
4	Hungary	Szabó, Portisch, Barcza, Bilek, Lengyel, Kluger,	22½	
5	Czechoslovakia	Pachman, Filip, Fichtl, Hort, Kozma, Ujtelky	21½	
6	Bulgaria	Bobotsov, Padevsky, Neikirch, Kolarov, Minev, Milev	21	
7	Argentina	Najdorf, Eliskases, Wexler, Bazán, Schweber, Foguelman	20½	
8	West Germany	Unzicker, Schmid, Darga, Lehmann, Bialas, Pfeiffer	19½	
9	East Germany	Uhlmann, Pietzsch, Malich, Dittmann, Fuchs, Golz	19	
10	Netherlands	Euwe, Donner, Bouwmeester, Prins, Kramer, Langeweg	17	
11	Romania	Ghițescu, Drimer, Radovici, Mititelu, Troianescu, Szabó	16½	7
12	England	Penrose, Golombek, Clarke, Haygarth, Barden, Wade	16½	4

Final B
#	Country	Players	Points	MP	HTH
13	Sweden	Ståhlberg, Lundin, Johansson, Nilsson, Sköld, Buskenström	27½		
14	Israel	Porat, Czerniak, Aloni, Persitz, Kraidman, Guthi	26½		
15	Austria	Robatsch, Beni, Lokvenc, Janetschek, Kaliwoda, Groiss	24½		
16	Denmark	Nielsen, Kølvig, Holm, Blom, Jensen, From	23½	13	3
17	Finland	Ojanen, Böök, Rantanen, Räisä, Fred, Niemelä	23½	13	1
18	Cuba	Jiménez, Cobo, Gonzáles, García, De Cardenas	23	11	
19	Norway	Johannessen, de Lange, Lindblom, Hoen, Svenneby, Myhre	23	10	
20	Spain	Pérez, Pomar, Torán, Mallofré, del Corral, Pulido	22½		
21	Poland	Śliwa, Plater, Tarnowski, Doda, Kostro, Filipowicz	22		
22	Chile	Letelier, Larraín, Hausman, Romo, Rojas	19½		
23	Iceland	Thorbergsson, Guðmundsson, Gunnarsson, Magnússon, Sólmundarson, Lárusson	16½		
24	India	Aaron, Sapre, Wahi, Seth	12		

Final C
#	Country	Players	Points	MP
25	Philippines	Campomanes, Borja, Naranja, Reyes, De Castro, Villanueva, Avecilla	28½	
26	Indonesia	Wotulo, Bachtiar, Baswedan, Tan, Panggabean	27½	17
27	Mongolia	Namzhil, Möömöö, Chalkhasuren, Myagmarsuren, Baldandorsh, Badamgarav G.	27½	15
28	Albania	Pustina, Hoxha, Konçi, Veizaj, Omari	26½	
29	Ecuador	Muñoz, Aguirre, Morales, Yépez, Garcés, Klein	26	
30	Portugal	Durão, Ribeiro, Gonçalves, De Oliveira, Rocha, Cardoso	25	15
31	France	Boutteville, Noradounguian, Bergraser, Casa, Linais, Cormier	25	13
32	Italy	Contedini, Tamburini, Palmiotto, Magrin, Mercuri	24	
33	Belgium	O'Kelly, Thibaut, Dunkelblum, Van Schoor, Franck, Blockx	23½	
34	Tunisia	Belkadi, Lagha, Kahia, Mohsen, Kchouk, Ben Cheik	21½	
35	Greece	Anastasopoulos, Angos, Papapostolou, Paidousis, Kapralos	20½	
36	Bolivia	Humerez, Villegas, Mendivil, Salazar, Soruco	19½	
37	Monaco	Kostjoerin, Fauconnier, Perrottey, d'Auriac, Renoy-Chevrier, Deslauriers J.	17½	
38	Ireland	Reilly, Littleton, O'Hare, Nash, Cassidy	17	
39	Malta	Camilleri, Soler, Gouder, Fenech, Cuschieri, Dingli	14	
40	Lebanon	Chalabi, Salameh, Gabriel, Galeb, Tarazi, Batlouni, Allam	8½	

Final A

№	Country	1	2	3	4	5	6	7	8	9	10	11	12	+	−	=	Points
1	Soviet Union	-	2½	2½	3½	3	4	3½	3½	3	2½	3	3	11	0	0	34
2	United States	1½	-	2½	2½	1½	3½	2½	2½	3½	3½	3½	2	8	2	1	29
3	Yugoslavia	1½	1½	-	2½	3	2½	2½	2½	2	3	3½	2½	8	2	1	27
4	Hungary	½	1½	1½	-	1½	2	2	3½	2½	2½	2½	2½	5	4	2	22½
5	Czechoslovakia	1	2½	1	2½	-	2	2	2½	2	2	1½	2½	4	3	4	21½
6	Bulgaria	0	½	1½	2	2	-	2	2	2	3	4	2	2	3	6	21
7	Argentina	½	1½	1½	2	2	2	-	2	2	2½	2	2½	2	3	6	20½
8	West Germany	½	1½	1½	½	1½	2	2	-	2	3	2	3	2	5	4	19½
9	East Germany	1	½	2	1½	2	2	2	2	-	1½	1	3½	1	5	5	19
10	Netherlands	1½	½	1	1½	2	1	1½	1	2½	-	2½	2	2	7	2	17
11	Romania	1	½	½	1½	2½	0	2	2	3	1½	-	2	2	6	3	16½
12	England	1	2	1½	1½	1½	2	1½	1	½	2	2	-	0	7	4	16½

Final B

№	Country	13	14	15	16	17	18	19	20	21	22	23	24	+	−	=	Points
13	Sweden	-	2	2½	2	3	2½	2½	2	2½	3	3	2½	8	0	3	27½
14	Israel	2	-	1½	2	1½	2	2	2½	2½	3½	3	4	5	2	4	26½
15	Austria	1½	2½	-	2½	3	2	1	2½	3	3	1½	2	6	3	2	24½
16	Denmark	2	2	1½	-	3	2	2	1	2	2½	2½	3	4	2	5	23½
17	Finland	1	2½	1	1	-	2½	3	3	1½	2	3	3	6	4	1	23½
18	Cuba	1½	2	2	2	1½	-	2½	2	2	2	2	3½	2	2	7	23
19	Norway	1½	2	3	2	1	1½	-	1½	1½	2½	2½	4	4	5	2	23
20	Spain	2	1½	1½	3	1	2	2½	-	1½	2	2½	3	4	4	3	22½
21	Poland	1½	1½	1	2	2½	2	2½	2½	-	1	3	2½	5	4	2	22
22	Chile	1	½	1	1½	2	2	1½	2	3	-	1½	3½	2	6	3	19½
23	Iceland	1	1	2½	1½	1	2	1½	1½	1	2½	-	1	2	8	1	16½
24	India	1½	0	2	1	1	½	0	1	1½	½	3	-	1	9	1	12

Final C

№	Country	1	2	3	4	5	6	7	8	9	10	11	+	−	=	Points
25	Philippines	3	3	2	2	3	2½	3	3	2	1	4	7	1	3	28½
25	Philippines	31	27	30	34	26	28	32	35	29	33	38	7	1	3	28½
26	Indonesia	2½	2	3½	3½	1	2½	2½	2	3½	2½	2	7	1	3	27½
26	Indonesia	33	29	28	30	25	32	31	27	35	34	36	7	1	3	27½
27	Mongolia	3½	1	2	2½	2	1½	3	2	3	4	3	6	2	3	27½
27	Mongolia	40	25	34	31	29	30	33	26	28	36	35	6	2	3	27½
28	Albania	2½	2	½	3½	3	1½	3½	2½	1	4	2½	7	3	1	26½
28	Albania	32	35	26	39	33	25	30	31	27	38	34	7	3	1	26½
29	Ecuador	3	2	2	1½	2	2	2½	2½	2	4	2½	5	1	5	26
29	Ecuador	34	26	33	32	27	35	38	37	25	40	39	5	1	5	26
30	Portugal	3	3	2	½	2½	2½	½	1½	3	4	2½	7	3	1	25
30	Portugal	37	38	25	26	35	27	28	36	40	39	33	7	3	1	25
31	France	1	3	2	1½	3½	3	1½	1½	2½	2½	3	6	4	1	25
31	France	25	39	35	27	36	34	26	28	38	32	37	6	4	1	25
32	Italy	1½	2½	2½	2½	2½	1½	1	4	2	1½	2½	6	4	1	24
32	Italy	28	37	38	29	34	26	25	39	36	31	40	6	4	1	24
33	Belgium	1½	3	2	2	1	2½	1	3	3	3	1½	5	4	2	23½
33	Belgium	26	36	29	35	28	39	27	40	37	25	30	5	4	2	23½
34	Tunisia	1	4	2	2	1½	1	2	2½	2½	1½	1½	3	5	3	21½
34	Tunisia	29	40	27	25	32	31	37	38	39	26	28	3	5	3	21½
35	Greece	2½	2	2	2	1½	2	3½	1	½	2½	1	3	4	4	20½
35	Greece	36	28	31	33	30	29	40	25	26	37	27	3	4	4	20½
36	Bolivia	1½	1	3	3	½	2	2	2½	2	0	2	3	4	4	19½
36	Bolivia	35	33	37	38	31	40	39	30	32	27	26	3	4	4	19½
37	Monaco	1	1½	1	3½	2½	1	2	1½	1	1½	1	2	8	1	17½
37	Monaco	30	32	36	40	39	38	34	29	33	35	31	2	8	1	17½
38	Ireland	3	1	1½	1	3	3	1½	1½	1½	0	0	3	8	0	17
38	Ireland	39	30	32	36	40	37	29	34	31	28	25	3	8	0	17
39	Malta	1	1	3½	½	1½	1½	2	0	1½	0	1½	1	9	1	14
39	Malta	38	31	40	28	37	33	36	32	34	30	29	1	9	1	14
40	Lebanon	½	0	½	½	1	2	½	1	1	0	1½	0	10	1	8½
40	Lebanon	27	34	39	37	38	36	35	33	30	29	32	0	10	1	8½

=== Individual medals ===
- Board 1: (Austria) Karl Robatsch 13½ / 16 = 84.4%
- Board 2: (Soviet Union) Mikhail Botvinnik 10½ / 13 = 80.8%
- Board 3: (Soviet Union) Paul Keres 10½ / 13 = 80.8%
- Board 4: (Mongolia) Lhamsuren Myagmarsuren and (Indonesia) Tan Hoan Liong 16½ / 20 = 82.5%
- 1st reserve: (Soviet Union) Vassily Smyslov 11½ / 13 = 88.5%
- 2nd reserve: (Soviet Union) Tigran Petrosian 12 / 13 = 92.3%
