= Osvaldo Bazán =

Argentine chess player

Personal information
- Born: 14 October 1934 Córdoba, Argentina
- Died: 30 May 1997 (aged 62)

Chess career
- Country: Argentina

Osvaldo Manuel Bazán (14 October 1934 — 30 May 1997), was an Argentine chess player, Argentine Chess Championship medalist (1959).

== Biography ==
Osvaldo Bazán ten times won the Córdoba Province Chess Championships (1961, 1962, 1963, 1964, 1969, 1971, 1973, 1976, 1981, 1986). Osvaldo Bazán often participated in the Argentine Chess Championship finals, where he showed the best result in 1959, when he shared second place with Alberto Foguelman behind Bernardo Wexler. Osvaldo Bazán was participant of the FIDE South America Zonal Tournament and a number of major International Chess Tournaments in South America.

Osvaldo Bazán played for Argentina in the Chess Olympiad:

- In 1960, at fourth board in the 14th Chess Olympiad in Leipzig (+5, =1, -4).
