= Rotunno =

Rotunno is a surname. Notable people with the surname include:

- Ernesto Rotunno, Uruguayan chess master
- Francisco Rotunno (1976–2025), Chilean footballer
- Giuseppe Rotunno (1923–2021), Italian cinematographer
- Joanne Rotunno (1931–1984), American actress
- Nicola Rotunno (1928–1999), Italian Roman Catholic prelate
