= Anton Fritz Gragger =

Austrian chess player

Personal information
- Born: c. 1920s

Chess career
- Country: Austria

Anton Fritz Gragger (born c. 1920s) is an Austrian chess player and Austrian Chess Championship medalist (1948, 1951).

== Biography ==
From the late 1940s to the early 1960s, Anton Fritz Gragger was one of Austrian leading chess players. In Austrian Chess Championship he twice won bronze medals: 1948 and 1951. In 1961, Gragger represented Austria in the FIDE Zonal tournament.

Gragger played for Austria in the Chess Olympiads:

- In 1962, at fourth board in the 15th Chess Olympiad in Varna (+6, =3, -7),
- In 1964, at fourth board in the 16th Chess Olympiad in Tel Aviv (+7, =2, -6).

Gragger also played for Austria in qualifying competitions of the European Team Chess Championship (1963) and international team matches.

Gragger was an engineer by profession.
