= Hiong Liong Tan =

Indonesian-Dutch chess player

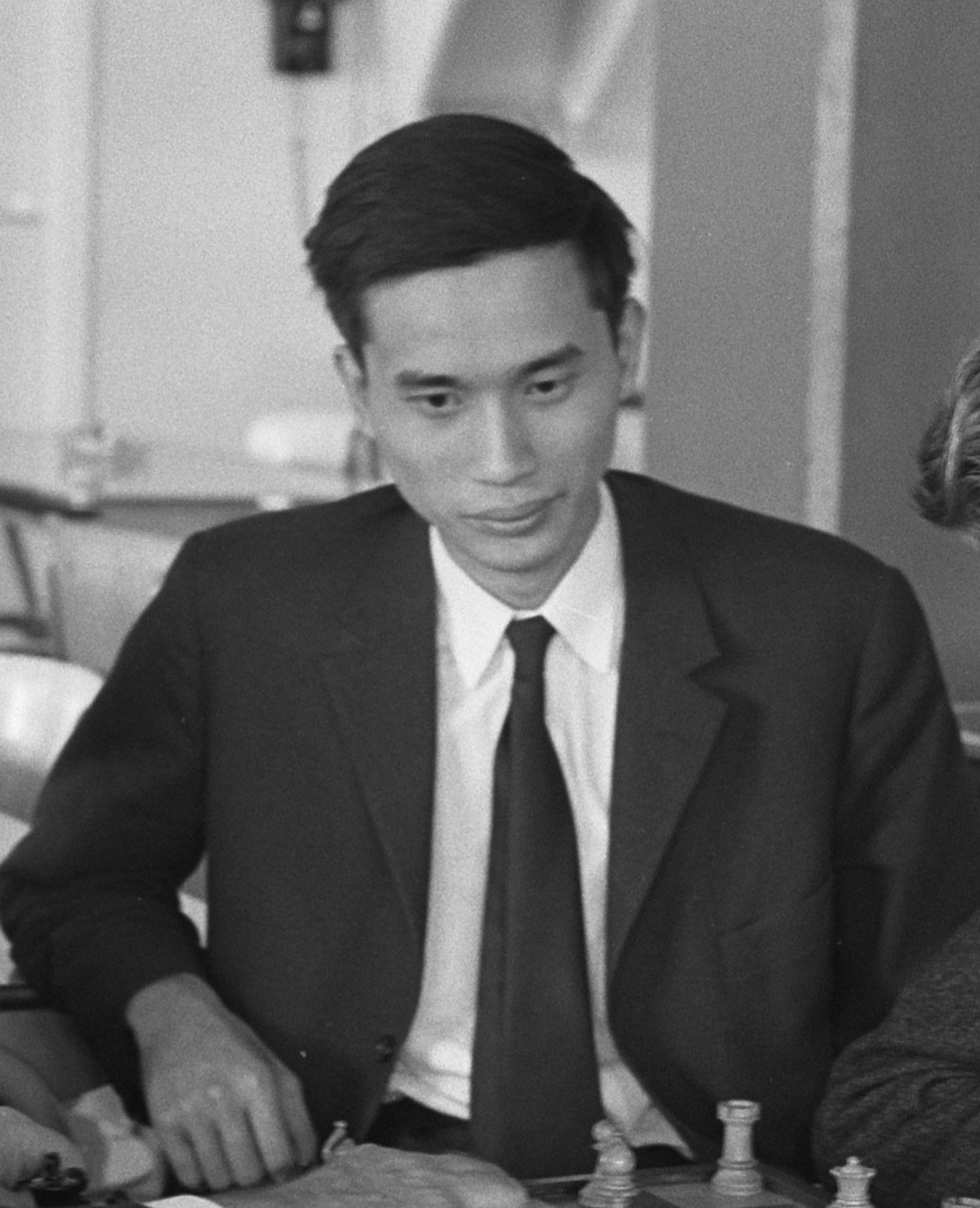
Hiong Liong Tan in 1962

Hiong Liong Tan, a.k.a. Tan Hoan Liong or H.L Tan (Chinese: 陳香良; pinyin: Chén Xiāngliáng; Pe̍h-ōe-jī: Tân Hiong-liông; 20 August 1938, Buitenzorg - September 2009, Bogor) was an Indonesian–Dutch chess player. He was the first Indonesian and one of the first Asian chess players to hold the International Master title.

Tan moved from Indonesia to Amsterdam in 1956 to finish high school, after which he went to study Insurance Mathematics. His first foray in chess was a 31 move loss in one of Botvinnik's simultaneous games in 1958, but he soon became a much stronger player.

He played for Indonesia at fourth board in the 14th Chess Olympiad at Leipzig 1960, and won an individual gold medal (+14 –1 =5).

Tan also took the Dutch Chess Championship at The Hague in 1961, defeating Jan Hein Donner on the way.

In 1962, he was co-winner of the traditional IBM international chess tournament at Amsterdam, alongside Moshe Czerniak.

He was awarded the International Master (IM) title in 1963 after scoring 7.5 out of 17 games at that year's Hoogovens tournament.

Tan also had a dan rank in Go.

Not long after this tournament Tan was hospitalized for schizophrenia and alcohol addiction. His parents came over from Indonesia, and brought him back to Bandung, where he initially lived in a clinic. After his parents' death, he returned to his birthplace of Bogor, where his family had built him a house. He did not play chess in international tournaments since 1963.
