= Arinbjörn Guðmundsson =

Icelandic chess player (1932–2014)

Personal information
- Born: 22 May 1932
- Died: 2014 (aged 82)

Chess career
- Country: Iceland; Australia

Arinbjörn Guðmundsson (22 May 1932 – 2014) was an Icelandic and Australian chess player. He is a Chess Olympiad individual medalist (1960).

== Biography ==
Arinbjörn Guðmundsson learned to play chess late, at the age of seventeen. However, he achieved good results in chess tournaments and was one of Icelandic leading chess players from 1955 to 1970. In 1954, together with Friðrik Ólafsson and other Icelandic chess players, Arinbjörn Guðmundsson founded the first chess magazine in the country. He regularly participated in Icelandic Chess Championships and Reykjavík International Chess tournaments (1955, 1957, 1960, 1964).

Arinbjörn Guðmundsson played for Iceland in the Chess Olympiads:

- In 1956, at second reserve board in the 12th Chess Olympiad in Moscow (+3, =1, -1),
- In 1958, at first reserve board in the 13th Chess Olympiad in Munich (+1, =6, -4),
- In 1960, at second board in the 14th Chess Olympiad in Leipzig (+7, =9, -0) and won individual silver medal,
- In 1962, at second board in the 15th Chess Olympiad in Varna (+3, =7, -1).

In 1960, in Reykjavík International Chess Tournament Arinbjörn Guðmundsson played a tactically challenging party against the next World Chess Champion Bobby Fischer. In 1969, Fisher included this party in his book My 60 Memorable Games.

In 1970 Arinbjörn Guðmundsson moved to Australia with his family. He settled in Brisbane, where he also spent the rest of his life. In 1971 Arinbjörn Guðmundsson participated in the Australian Chess Championship. After that, he rarely played chess, except socially at the Logan City Chess Club. Arinbjörn Guðmundsson died in the summer of 2014.
