= Eduardo Franco Raymundo =

Spanish chess player (1934–1996)

Personal information
- Born: 13 February 1934
- Died: 4 May 1996 (aged 62)

Chess career
- Country: Spain

Eduardo Franco Raymundo (13 February 1934 – 4 May 1996) was a Spanish chess player, Clare Benedict Cup individual gold medal winner (1962), Spanish Team Chess Championship winner (1968, 1969).

== Biography ==
From the late 1950s to the early 1970s, Eduardo Franco Raymundo was one of Spain's leading chess players. In 1957, in Zaragoza he shared 3rd place in Spanish Chess Championship. With chess club CA Schweppes Madrid Eduardo Franco Raymundo won two gold (1968, 1969) and silver (1973) medals in Spanish Team Chess Championships. He was participant of many international chess tournaments.

Eduardo Franco Raymundo played for Spain in the Chess Olympiads:

- In 1962, at fourth board in the 15th Chess Olympiad in Varna (+3, =1, -7),
- In 1966, at first reserve board in the 17th Chess Olympiad in Havana (+2, =2, -4).

Eduardo Franco Raymundo played for Spain in the European Team Chess Championship:

- In 1961, at eighth board in the 2nd European Team Chess Championship in Oberhausen (+1, =8, -1).

Eduardo Franco Raymundo played for Spain in the European Team Chess Championship preliminaries:

- In 1957, at reserve board in the 1st European Team Chess Championship preliminaries (+1, =1, -2),
- In 1965, at seventh board in the 3rd European Team Chess Championship preliminaries (+1, =1, -0),
- In 1970, at tenth board in the 4th European Team Chess Championship preliminaries (+0, =3, -0).

Eduardo Franco Raymundo played for Spain in the Clare Benedict Chess Cups:

- In 1962, at reserve board in the 9th Clare Benedict Chess Cup in Bern (+2, =1, -0) and won individual gold medal,
- In 1965, at reserve board in the 13th Clare Benedict Chess Cup in Brunnen (+0, =2, -1).
