= Kaj Blom =

Danish chess player (1925–1989)

Personal information
- Born: 11 October 1925
- Died: 31 August 1989 (aged 63)

Chess career
- Country: Denmark
- Peak rating: 2250

Kaj Blom (11 October 1925 – 31 August 1989) was a Danish chess player, Danish Chess Championship medalist (1961, 1963, 1964).

== Biography ==
From the early 1960s to the end of 1970s, Kaj Blom was one of Danish leading chess players. He participated many times in the finals of Danish Chess Championships and won three medals: silver (1964) and two bronze (1961, 1963). In 1961, in Mariánské Lázně Kaj Blom participated in World Chess Championship Zonal Tournament.

Blom played for Denmark in the Chess Olympiads:

- In 1960, at fourth board in the 14th Chess Olympiad in Leipzig (+6, =5, -3),
- In 1964, at fourth board in the 16th Chess Olympiad in Tel Aviv (+5, =5, -3).

Blom played for Denmark in the European Team Chess Championship preliminaries:

- In 1970, at fourth board in the 4th European Team Chess Championship preliminaries (+3, =0, -0).

Blom died on 31 August 1989, at the age of 63.
