= Eduardo Etcheverry =

Uruguayan chess player

Personal information
- Born: unknown
- Died: unknown

Chess career
- Country: Uruguay

Eduardo Etcheverry (unknown – unknown) was a Uruguayan chess player, and Uruguayan Chess Championship winner (1962).

== Biography ==
In the 1960s Eduardo Etcheverry was one of the leading Uruguayan chess players. He won two medals in Uruguayan Chess Championship: gold (1962) and silver (1961). In 1963, in Havana Eduardo Etcheverry participated in Pan American Chess Championship and finished in 10th place.

Eduardo Etcheverry played for Uruguay in the Chess Olympiad:

- In 1962, at second board in the 15th Chess Olympiad in Varna (+4, =2, -10).
