= Yümjiriin Mönkh-Amgalan =

Mongolian dialectoloigst

Yümjiriin Mönkh-Amgalan (Mongolian: Юмжирийн Мөнх-Амгалан) (born 1956 in Bayanmönkh, Khentii) is a Professor of Linguistics at the National University of Mongolia.

Mönkh-Amgalan earned his M.A. (1979), PhD (1993), and Doctor of Science (1997) in linguistics from the National University of Mongolia. His research focuses on modern Mongolian modality, pragmatics, semantics and syntax. He is most noted for his pioneering work on modern Mongolian modality as well as his work on comparative Mongolian dialectology.

Mönkh-Amgalan has taught linguistics at the National University of Mongolia since 1979. He has taught Mongolian at Bloomington, Indiana from 2001 onwards. From 2005 to 2009 he was chair of the Sh. Luvsanvandan Department of Mongolian Linguistics, School of Mongolian Language and Culture, National University of Mongolia.

== Notable publications ==
- Yumjiriin Mönkh-Amgalan (with Sürengiin Möömöö) (1984) Orchin üyeiin mongol khel ayalguu [Contemporary Mongolian languages and dialects], Ulaanbaatar: Shinjlekh ukhaany akademiin khevlekh üildver [Academy of Sciences Press], 354 pp.
- (1998) Orchin tsagiin mongol khelnii baimjiin ai [The category of modality in Contemporary Mongolian], 2nd edition, Ulaanbaatar: MONTSAME Agentlagiin khevlekh üildver [MONTSAME Printing House], ISBN 99929-951-2-2. 370 pp.
