= Khürmen, Ömnögovi =

District in Ömnögovi Province, Mongolia

Coordinates: 43°18′20″N 104°04′31″E

Khürmen District Хүрмэн сум ᠬᠦᠷᠮᠡᠨᠰᠤᠮᠤ
- District
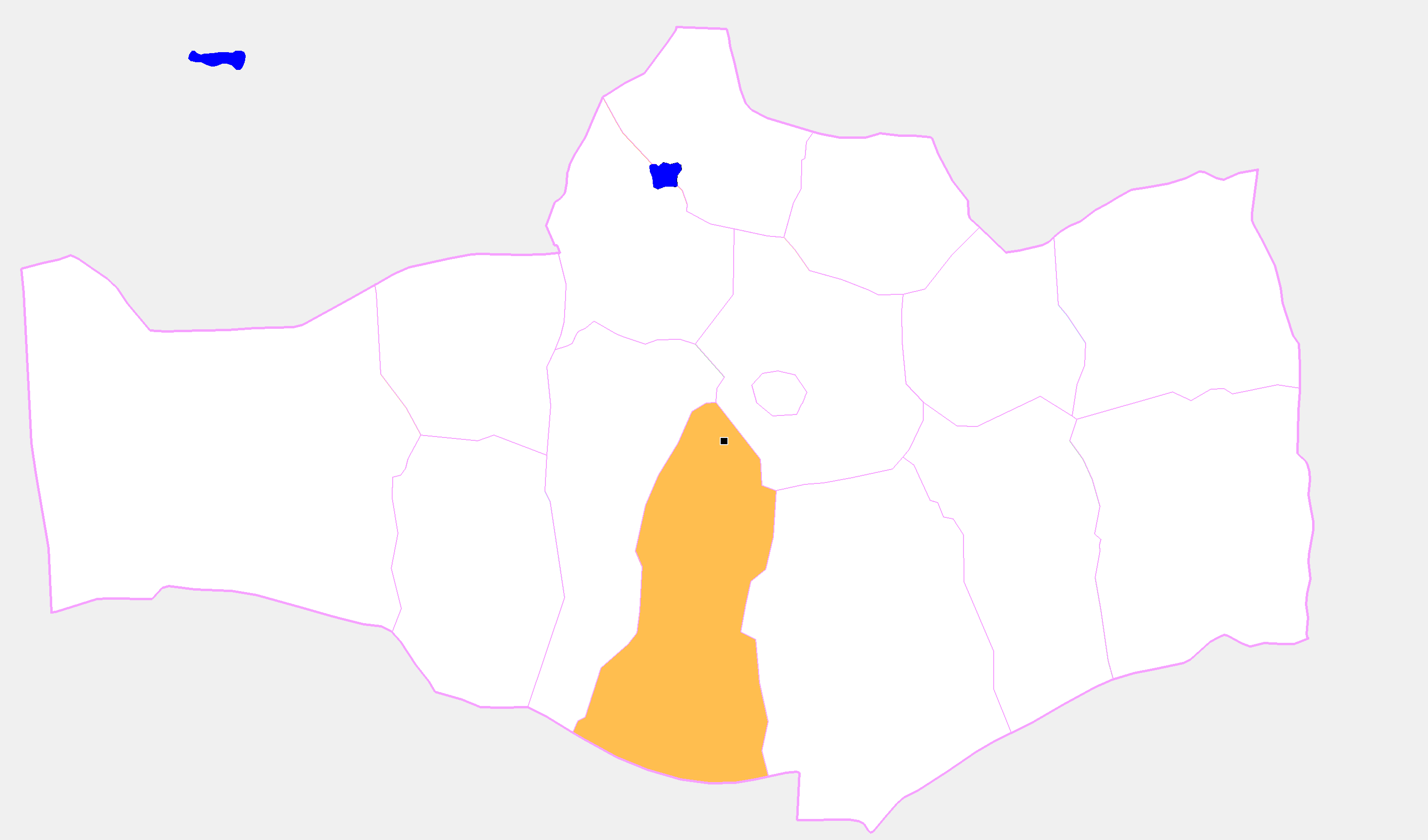
- Khürmen District in Ömnögovi Province
- Country: Mongolia
- Province: Ömnögovi Province

Area
  - Total: 12,393 km^{2} (4,785 sq mi)
- Time zone: UTC+8 (UTC + 8)

Khürmen (Mongolian: Хүрмэн "basalt") is a sum (district) of Ömnögovi Province in southern Mongolia. In 2009, its population was 1,796.

== Administrative divisions ==
The district is divided into three bags, which are:

- Janjin (Mongolian: Жанжин)
- Khurmen
- Tulga

== Notable natives ==
- Naidan Namzhil, chess player
