= Sürengiin Möömöö =

Mongolian linguist and chess player (1930–2021)

Personal information
- Born: 1930 Khyargas, Uvs, Mongolia
- Died: July 7, 2021 (aged 90–91)

Chess career
- Country: Mongolia

Sürengiin Möömöö (Mongolian: Сүрэнгийн Мөөмөө) was a Mongolian linguist and chess player. He was born in 1930 in Khyargas, Uvs, and died on 7 July 2021 due to illness.

== Linguistics career ==
Sürengiin Möömöö graduated from the National University of Mongolia in 1957 with a degree in Mongolian language, literature and linguistics. He then began a teaching career at that university which lasted over 50 years, becoming an associate professor in 1982 and a full professor in 1995. He obtained a Candidate of Sciences degree for his pioneering studies of Mongolian phonetics at Leningrad State University in 1970, and a Doctor of Science degree from the Humboldt University of Berlin in 1984 for his dissertation on Mongolian dialectology. He taught at the University of Warsaw from 1969 to 1973 and was a visiting professor at Osaka University from 1978 to 1980.

In 1982, Möömöö co-authored a book on Mongolian dialects with his student Yümjiriin Mönkh-Amgalan. He edited Damdinsüren and Osor's 1983 Mongolian Orthographic Dictionary (Mongolian: Монгол үсгийн дүрмийн толь), the standard source for Mongolian Cyrillic orthography until 2018. He was a member of the Mongolian Academy of Sciences, and was awarded the Order of the Polar Star in 2003, and the title of Honoured Teacher of Mongolia by President Nambaryn Enkhbayar in 2008.

== Chess career ==
Sürengiin Möömöö competed in several editions of the Mongolian Chess Championship. He finished second at the 1955 championship, won it in 1958, and finished third in 1961.

In the first international chess tournament held in Mongolia (Ulan Bator 1956, won by Heinz Liebert), Möömöö finished in seventh place with 9/15, making the best score among the Mongolian participants. He tied for third with Andor Lilienthal in a tournament held in Tashkent in 1959, which was won by Alexander Grushevsky. In 1960, he played a match for the West Asian subzonal (a qualifying stage for the 1963 World Chess Championship) held in Madras, losing 1–3 to Manuel Aaron.

Möömöö played for Mongolia in three Chess Olympiads:

- In 1956, on third board in the 12th Chess Olympiad in Moscow, scoring +5, =4, -4;
- In 1960, on second board in the 14th Chess Olympiad in Leipzig, scoring +7, =2, -8;
- In 1962, on second board in the 15th Chess Olympiad in Varna, scoring +5, =6, -5.

Möömöö also represented Mongolia three times in the World Student Team Chess Championships:

- In 1958, on first board in the 5th World Student Team Chess Championship in Varna, scoring +4, =0, -5;
- In 1959, on second board in the 6th World Student Team Chess Championship in Budapest, scoring +5, =3, -5;
- In 1960, on second board in the 7th World Student Team Chess Championship in Leningrad, scoring +5, =0, -7.

Möömöö competed in the inaugural World Senior Chess Championship held in Bad Wörishofen in 1991, where he scored 6.5/11 and finished in a tie for 23rd place.

== Publications ==
- Möömöö, Sürengiin (1962). Зөв бичих дүрмийн толь (in Mongolian). Улсын Хэвлэлийн хэрэг эрхлэл хороо. OCLC 1062289151.
- Möömöö, Sürengiin (1970). Система фонем современного монгольского языка: экспериментальное исследование [The phoneme system of modern Mongolian: an experimental study] (к. филол. н.) (in Russian). Leningrad State University.
- Möömöö, Sürengiin (1982). Galsan, S. (ed.). Орчин үеийн монгол хэлний аялгуу [Modern Mongolian phonetics] (in Mongolian). Ulsyn Khevleliin Gazar. OCLC 41284881.
- Möömöö, Sürengiin; Mönkh-Amgalan, Yümjiriin (1982). Орчин цагийн монгол хэлний авиазүй [Modern Mongolian language and dialects] (in Mongolian). Mongolian Academy of Sciences. OCLC 1015012225.
- Möömöö, Sürengiin (1984). Die Sprechkultur und das System der Intonation in der mongolischen Sprache [The linguistic culture and the system of intonation in the Mongolian language] (Diss. B) (in German). Humboldt University of Berlin. OCLC 916980822.
- Möömöö, Sürengiin; Tsedendamba, Tsogdogiin, eds. (1997). Орчин цагийн Монгол хэл [Modern Mongolian] (in Mongolian). Mongolian Academy of Sciences. OCLC 131282441.
