= Naidan Namzhil =

Mongolian chess player

Personal information
- Born: 5 March 1914 Khürmen, Ömnögovi
- Died: unknown

Chess career
- Country: Mongolia

Naidan Namzhil (Mongolian: Найдан Намжил; 5 March 1914 – unknown) was a Mongolian chess player, Mongolian Chess Championship winner (1959).

== Biography ==
In the 1950s Naidan Namzhil was one of Mongolian leading chess players. In 1959 he won Mongolian Chess Championship.

Naidan Namzhil played for Mongolia in the Chess Olympiads:

- In 1956, at second reserve board in the 12th Chess Olympiad in Moscow (+0, =1, -1).
- In 1960, at first board in the 14th Chess Olympiad in Leipzig (+1, =2, -9),
- In 1962, at second reserve board in the 15th Chess Olympiad in Varna (+0, =0, -1),
- In 1964, at second reserve board in the 16th Chess Olympiad in Tel Aviv (+0, =0, -1).
