= José Bademian Orchanian =

Uruguayan chess player (1927–2013)

Personal information
- Born: 27 April 1927
- Died: 25 August 2013 (aged 86)

Chess career
- Country: Uruguay
- Title: FIDE Master (1989)
- Peak rating: 2300 (July 1988)

José Bademian Orchanian (27 April 1927 – 25 August 2013) was a Uruguayan chess FIDE Master (FM) of Armenian origin and a winner of the Uruguayan Chess Championship (1976).

== Biography ==
In the 1970s and 1980s José Bademian Orchanian was one of the leading Uruguayan chess players. He won three medals in the Uruguayan Chess Championships: gold (1976), silver (1974) and bronze (1987). José Bademian Orchanian twice participated in Pan American Chess Championships. He participated multiple times in the traditional Mar del Plata chess tournament.

José Bademian Orchanian played for Uruguay in the Chess Olympiads:

- in 1974, at the second board in the 21st Chess Olympiad in Nice (+7, =3, −7),
- in 1976, at the second board in the 22nd Chess Olympiad in Haifa (+5, =2, −3),
- in 1978, at the fourth board in the 23rd Chess Olympiad in Buenos Aires (+4, =4, −3),
- in 1986, at the fourth board in the 27th Chess Olympiad in Dubai (+3, =0, −4).

José Bademian Orchanian played for Uruguay in the Pan American Team Chess Championship:

- in 1987, at the second board in the 3rd Panamerican Team Chess Championship in Junín (+0, =0, −8).
