= Sigfred From =

Danish chess player

Personal information
- Born: 12 December 1925
- Died: April 1998

Chess career
- Country: Denmark

Sigfred From (12 December 1925 – April 1998), was a Danish chess player.

== Biography ==
From the begin of 1960s to the begin of 1970s Sigfred From was one of Danish leading chess players. He regularly played in Danish Chess Championships. Her best result was the shared of 5th – 6th places in 1961 and 1962. In 1963, Sigfred From played for Denmark in the Nordic Chess Championship.

Sigfred From played for Denmark in the Chess Olympiads:

- In 1960, at second reserve board in the 14th Chess Olympiad in Leipzig (+0, =3, -6),
- In 1962, at third board in the 15th Chess Olympiad in Varna (+4, =3, -7),
- In 1964, at second reserve board in the 16th Chess Olympiad in Tel Aviv (+5, =2, -3).

Sigfred From played for Denmark in the European Team Chess Championship:

- In 1970, at ninth board in the 4th European Team Chess Championship in Kapfenberg (+0, =1, -5).

Sigfred From played for Denmark in the European Team Chess Championship preliminaries:

- In 1970, at fifth board in the 4th European Team Chess Championship preliminaries (+3, =0, -1).

Sigfred From played for Denmark in the Nordic Chess Cup:

- In 1971, at third board in the 2nd Nordic Chess Cup in Großenbrode (+2, =1, -2) and won team silver medal.
