= Otto Benítez =

Uruguayan chess player

Chess career
- Country: Uruguay

Otto Benítez is a Uruguayan chess player, two-times Uruguayan Chess Championship winner (1974, 1975).

== Biography ==
In the 1960s and 1970s, Otto Benítez was one of Uruguay's leading chess players. He won three medals in Uruguayan Chess Championships: 2 gold (1974, 1975) and silver (1962). In 1975, Otto Benítez participated in World Chess Championship South American Zonal tournament, held in Fortaleza.

Otto Benítez played for Uruguay in the Chess Olympiad:

- In 1976, at first board in the 22nd Chess Olympiad in Haifa (+4, =2, -4).

Otto Benítez played for Uruguay in the Pan American Team Chess Championship:

- In 1971, at first board in the 1st Panamerican Team Chess Championship in Tucuman (+2, =1, -3).
