= César Muñoz =

Ecuadorian chess player

César Muñoz Vicuña (24 December 1928, General Pedro J. Montero, Guayas, Ecuador – 26 September 1997) was an Ecuadorian chess master. An amateur, he was an engineer by profession.

He played for Ecuador at first board in the fourth World Student Team Chess Championship at Reykjavík 1957 (+3 –6 =4), where he beat already reputed Fridrik Olafsson, and Bent Larsen.

At the 14th Chess Olympiad at Leipzig 1960 (+9 –3 =7), the unknown Ecuadorian caused a sensation in the preliminaries of the Leipzig Olympiad when he beat Bobby Fischer with the Dragon Variation of the Sicilian Defence, Fischer's only ever loss against this variation.

In 1962, he took second place behind Olavo Yépez in the Ecuadorian championship in Pichincha; and took seventh place at Quito 1969 (zonal; Eleazar Jiménez and Olavo Yépez won).

For a number of years he was chair of the Ecuadorian Sports Association, and the Complejo Deportivo César Muñoz Vicuña in Guayaquil was named after him.

== Notable chess games ==
- Bent Larsen vs César Muñoz, Reykjavík 1957, 4th World Student Team Chess Championship, English, A15, 0-1
- Robert James Fischer vs César Muñoz, Leipzig 1960, 14th Olympiad, Sicilian, Dragon, Yugoslav Attack, B77, 0-1
