= Peter Korning =

Danish chess player (1902–1995)

Personal information
- Born: 26 September 1902
- Died: 1995

Chess career
- Country: Denmark

Peter Korning (26 September 1902 – 1995), was a Danish chess player.

== Biography ==
Peter Korning participated in the seven finals of Danish Chess Championships: the first performance took place in 1932, the last - in 1963. As a member of the Danish national chess team, he took part an international match with the East Germany national chess team.

Peter Korning played for Denmark in the Chess Olympiad:

- In 1962, at first reserve board in the 15th Chess Olympiad in Varna (+1, =1, -6).

In later years, Peter Korning active participated in correspondence chess tournaments.
