= Gonchigiin Chalkhaasüren =

Mongolian chess player (1927–2021)

Personal information
- Born: 1927 Khalzan, Sükhbaatar, Mongolia
- Died: 2021 (aged 93–94)

Chess career
- Country: Mongolia

Gonchigiin Chalkhaasüren (Mongolian: Гончигийн Чалхаасүрэн; 1927–2021) was a Mongolian chess player and Mongolian Chess Championship winner (1961). He was born in 1927 in Khalzan, Sükhbaatar.

== Biography ==
In the 1960s Chalkhaasüren was one of Mongolia's leading chess players. In 1961, he won the Mongolian Chess Championship.

Chalkhaasüren played for Mongolia in the Chess Olympiads:

- In 1960, at third board in the 14th Chess Olympiad in Leipzig (+4, =7, -5),
- In 1962, at fourth board in the 15th Chess Olympiad in Varna (+2, =9, -6),
- In 1964, at first reserve board in the 16th Chess Olympiad in Tel Aviv (+3, =3, -6),
- In 1966, at second reserve board in the 17th Chess Olympiad in Havana (+3, =3, -3).

He played for Mongolia in the World Student Team Chess Championships:

- In 1959, at fourth board in the 6th World Student Team Chess Championship in Budapest (+6, =2, -5),
- In 1960, at third board in the 7th World Student Team Chess Championship in Leningrad (+1, =4, -6).

Chalkhaasüren died in 2021.
