= Roberto Silva Nazzari =

Uruguayan chess player (born 1938)

Personal information
- Born: 1938 (age 87–88)

Chess career
- Country: Uruguay

Roberto Silva Nazzari (born 1938) is a Uruguayan chess player who won the Uruguayan Chess Championship in 1971.

== Biography ==
In the 1960s and 1970s Roberto Silva Nazzari was one of the leading Uruguayan chess players. In 1971 he won Uruguayan Chess Championship. Roberto Silva Nazzari participated in a number of international tournaments in South America. In 1972, in São Paulo he participated in World Chess Championship South American Zonal tournament where he ranked 18th.

Roberto Silva Nazzari played for Uruguay in the Chess Olympiads:

- In 1962, at first reserve board in the 15th Chess Olympiad in Varna (+4, =4, -5),
- In 1976, at fourth board in the 22nd Chess Olympiad in Haifa (+1, =4, -2),
- In 1978, at third board in the 23rd Chess Olympiad in Buenos Aires (+2, =5, -3).

Roberto Silva Nazzari played for Uruguay in the Pan American Team Chess Championship:

- In 1991, at fourth board in the 4th Panamerican Team Chess Championship in Guarapuava (+0, =3, -2).
