= Söderberg =

Söderberg is a common Swedish surname. Variations of the name include Soderberg and Soderbergh.

== Geographical distribution ==
As of 2014, 95.5% of all known bearers of the surname Söderberg were residents of Sweden (frequency 1:828) and 2.8% of Finland (1:15,705).

In Sweden, the frequency of the surname was higher than national average (1:828) in the following counties:

1. Västernorrland County (1:305)
2. Gotland County (1:406)
3. Västmanland County (1:489)
4. Södermanland County (1:547)
5. Jämtland County (1:548)
6. Uppsala County (1:574)
7. Dalarna County (1:632)
8. Norrbotten County (1:648)
9. Gävleborg County (1:656)
10. Örebro County (1:702)
11. Kronoberg County (1:766)
12. Västerbotten County (1:785)
13. Stockholm County (1:787)
14. Värmland County (1:793)

In Finland, the frequency of the surname was higher than national average (1:15,705) in the following regions:

1. Åland (1:850)
2. Ostrobothnia (1:3,104)
3. Uusimaa (1:8,744)
4. Satakunta (1:9,280)

== Surname ==
=== People named Söderberg ===
- Anders Söderberg (b. 1975), Swedish athlete in ice hockey
- Anna Söderberg (b. 1973), Swedish female athlete in discus throw
- Bertil Söderberg (b. 1947), Swedish athlete in handball
- Carl Söderberg (b. 1985), Swedish ice hockey player
- David Söderberg (b. 1979), Finnish athlete in hammer throw
- Dora Söderberg (1899–1990), Swedish actress
- Eugénie Söderberg (1903–1973), German-born Swedish-American writer and journalist
- Freddy Söderberg (b. 1984), Swedish athlete in football
- Hjalmar Söderberg (1869–1941), Swedish novelist, playwright, poet and journalist
- Inga-Britt Söderberg (1935–2019), Finnish model and former Miss Europe
- Lennart Söderberg (1941–2022), Swedish athlete/manager in football
- Johan Söderberg (b. 1962), Swedish film director
- Johan Söderberg (b. 1973), Swedish musician
- Tommy Söderberg (b. 1948), Swedish football coach
- Torgny Söderberg (f. 1980s), Swedish songwriter

=== People named Soderberg ===
- Alicia M. Soderberg (b. 1977), United States astrophysicist
- Brad Soderberg (b. 1962), United States basketball coach
- Bryce Soderberg (b. 1980), Canadian musician
- Carl R. Soderberg (1895–1979), United States electrical engineer
- Chuck Soderberg (f. 2000s), United States politician
- Lena Soderberg (born 1951), Swedish actress
- Mary Soderberg (f. 2000s), United States female politician
- Nancy Soderberg (f. 1990s–2000s), United States foreign policy analyst
- Peter H. Soderberg (f. 1970s–2000s), United States business manager

=== People named Soderbergh ===
- Steven Soderbergh (b. 1963), United States film director

=== People named Söderborg ===
- Berndt Söderborg (b. 1933), Swedish chess master
