= Emanuel Guthi =

Israeli chess master (born 1938)

Emanuel Guthi (Hebrew: עמנואל גותי; born 1938) is an Israeli chess master.

He played twice for Israel in Chess Olympiads.

- In 1960, at second reserve board in 14th Chess Olympiad in Leipzig (+7 –2 =4);
- In 1964, at first reserve board in 16th Chess Olympiad in Tel Aviv (+2 –4 =0).

He won the individual silver medal at Leipzig in 1960.
