= Manuel Dienavorian Lacherian =

Uruguayan chess player (born 1938)

Personal information
- Born: 14 March 1938 (age 88)

Chess career
- Country: Uruguay

Manuel Dienavorian Lacherian (born 14 March 1938) is a Uruguayan chess player of Armenian origin and two-time Uruguayan Chess Championship winner (1980 and 1987).

== Biography ==
From the end-1960s to the end-1980s, Lacherian was one of Uruguay's leading chess players. He won seven medals in the Uruguayan Chess Championships, including 2 gold (1980, 1987), 4 silver (1968, 1971, 1974, 1979) and 1 bronze (1988). In 1981, Lacherian participated in the Pan American Chess Championships in San Pedro de Jujuy.

Additionally, Lacherian played for Uruguay in the Chess Olympiads:

- In 1976, at second reserve board in the 22nd Chess Olympiad in Haifa (+4, =3, -2),
- In 1978, at second board in the 23rd Chess Olympiad in Buenos Aires (+3, =7, -2),
- In 1982, at second board in the 25th Chess Olympiad in Lucerne (+4, =5, -2),
- In 1988, at third board in the 28th Chess Olympiad in Thessaloniki (+4, =5, -2).

Lacherian also played for Uruguay in the Pan American Team Chess Championships:

- In 1971, at fourth board in the 1st Panamerican Team Chess Championship in Tucuman (+1, =5, -0),
- In 1987, at first board in the 3rd Panamerican Team Chess Championship in Junín (+0, =3, -4).
