= Lorenzo Bauzá =

Uruguayan chess player (1917–1971)

Personal information
- Born: 3 October 1917
- Died: 22 December 1971 (aged 54)

Chess career
- Country: Uruguay

Lorenzo R. Bauzá (3 October 1917 – 22 December 1971) was a Uruguayan chess player, five-time Uruguayan Chess Championship winner (1945, 1950, 1951, 1954, 1955).

== Biography ==
From the mid-1940s to the beginning of the 1960s Lorenzo Bauzá was one of the leading Uruguayan chess players. He won the Uruguayan Chess Championships five time: 1945, 1950, 1951, 1954, and 1955. Lorenzo Bauzá twice participated in World Chess Championship South American Zonal tournaments (1951, 1954).

Lorenzo Bauzá played for Uruguay in the Chess Olympiad:

- In 1962, at fourth board in the 15th Chess Olympiad in Varna (+8, =5, -6).
