= Tomas Serra Olives =

Spanish chess player

Tomas Serra
Personal information
- Full name: Tomas Serra Olives
- Born: 9 April 1944 (age 82)

Chess career
- Country: Spain
- Title: FIDE Master (FM) (2006)

Tomas Serra Olives (born 9 April 1944) is a Spanish chess FIDE Master (FM) (2006), three-times Spanish Senior Chess Championships winner (2009, 2010, 2012).

== Biography ==
In the beginning of 1960s Serra was one of Spain's leading chess players.

Serra played for Spain in the Chess Olympiad:

- In 1962, at second reserve board in the 15th Chess Olympiad in Varna (+5, =4, -1).

Serra played for Spain in the European Team Chess Championship preliminaries:

- In 1961, at seventh board in the 2nd European Team Chess Championship preliminaries (+0, =1, -1),

Serra successfully participated in the seniors chess championships. He three times won the Spanish Senior Chess Championship: 2009, 2010, and 2012.
