= Walter Estrada Degrandi =

Uruguayan chess player (1924–1990)

Personal information
- Born: 1924 Montevideo
- Died: 1990 (aged 65–66) Montevideo

Chess career
- Country: Uruguay

Walter Estrada Degrandi (1924 – 1990) was a Uruguayan chess player, and nine-time Uruguayan Chess Championship winner (1953, 1959, 1960, 1961, 1966, 1967, 1973, 1977, 1979).

== Biography ==
From the 1950s to the 1970s Walter Estrada Degrandi was one of the leading Uruguayan chess players. He won the Uruguayan Chess Championships nine time: 1953, 1959, 1960, 1961, 1966, 1967, 1973, 1977, and 1979. Walter Estrada Degrandiparticipated in World Chess Championship South American Zonal tournaments three times (1954, 1960, 1978).

Walter Estrada Degrandi played for Uruguay in the Chess Olympiads:

- In 1962, at first board in the 15th Chess Olympiad in Varna (+3, =4, -9),
- In 1978, at first board in the 23rd Chess Olympiad in Buenos Aires (+1, =1, -4).

Walter Estrada Degrandi played for Uruguay in the Pan American Team Chess Championships:

- In 1971, at third board in the 1st Panamerican Team Chess Championship in Tucuman (+1, =1, -3).
