= Manuel Larrea =

Uruguayan chess player

Personal information
- Born: 9 February 1980 (age 46)

Chess career
- Country: Uruguay
- Title: FIDE Master (2006)
- Peak rating: 2353 (July 2011)

Gustavo Manuel Larrea Llorca (born 9 February 1980) is an Uruguayan chess player who holds the title of FIDE Master (FM) (2006). He is a three-time Uruguayan Chess Championship winner (2010, 2013, 2015) and a Chess Olympiad individual gold medal winner (2006).

== Biography ==
Manuel Larrea won the Uruguayan Chess Championship three times (2010, 2013, 2015), winning a silver medal on 2007, 2008 and (2014).

Manuel Larrea played for Uruguay in the Chess Olympiads:

- In 2002, at the fourth board in the 35th Chess Olympiad in Bled (+3, =3, -5),
- In 2004, at the second reserve board in the 36th Chess Olympiad in Calvià (+1, =2, -3),
- In 2006, at the third board in the 37th Chess Olympiad in Turin (+7, =0, -1), winning an individual gold medal,
- In 2008, at the second board in the 38th Chess Olympiad in Dresden (+2, =2, -5),
- In 2010, at the second board in the 39th Chess Olympiad in Khanty-Mansiysk (+2, =4, -4),
- In 2014, at the first board in the 41st Chess Olympiad in Tromsø (+2, =1, -6),
- In 2016, at the fourth board in the 42nd Chess Olympiad in Baku (+3, =0, -5).

He also played for Uruguay in the World Junior Team Chess Championship (1998) and the Panamerican Team Chess Championship (2013).
