= Unto Raisa =

Finnish chess player (born 1934)

Personal information
- Born: 19 March 1934 (age 92)

Chess career
- Country: Finland

Unto Raisa (born 19 March 1934) is a Finnish chess player, two-times Finnish Chess Championship medalist (1962, 1964).

== Biography ==
From the first half of 1960s, Unto Raisa was one of Finland's leading chess players. In Finnish Chess Championships he has won two silver (1962, 1964) medals.

Unto Raisa played for Finland in the Chess Olympiads:

- In 1960, at fourth board in the 14th Chess Olympiad in Leipzig (+8, =8, -3),
- In 1962, at second board in the 15th Chess Olympiad in Varna (+5, =7, -7).

Unto Raisa played for Finland in the European Team Chess Championship preliminaries:

- In 1961, at seventh board in the 2nd European Team Chess Championship preliminaries (+3, =1, -0).
