= Raimundo García =

Argentine chess player (1936–2020)

Raimundo García (27 May 1936 – 13 October 2020) was an Argentine chess master.

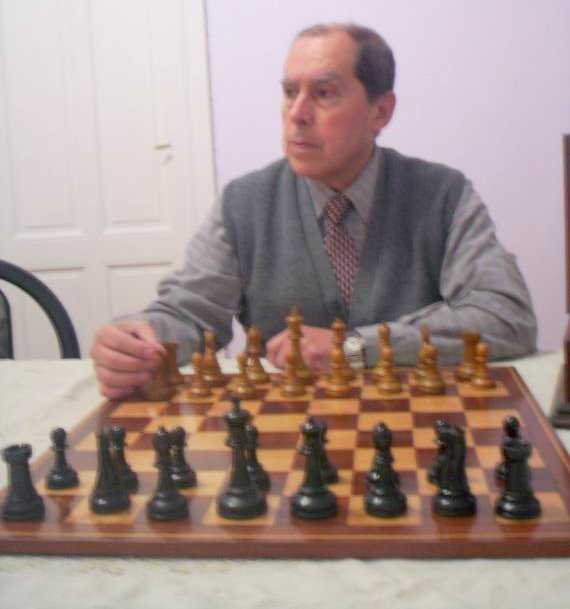
Raimundo García

== Career ==
At the beginning of his career, he took 7th at Santa Fe 1956 (Miguel Najdorf won). Then he tied for 10-11th in Argentine Chess Championship (Hermann Pilnik won) in 1958, tied for 6-7th at Quilmes 1959 (Alberto Foguelman won), and tied for 3rd-5th at Buenos Aires 1961 (ARG-ch, Héctor Rossetto won).

García won at Mar del Plata 1962 (Torneo Latino-americano), and was Argentine Champion in 1963. In 1963 he won a match against Samuel Schweber (3 : 2) in Buenos Aires, tied for 7-9th at Fortaleza 1963 (zonal, Rossetto won), and took 10th at Buenos Aires 1964 (Paul Keres won).

He tied for 5-6th at Buenos Aires / Rio Hondo 1966 (zonal, Henrique Mecking won), tied for 3rd-4th at Mar del Plata 1969 (zonal, Najdorf and Oscar Panno won) and lost a match (play-off) to Mecking (0.5 : 2.5) at São Paulo 1969, took 14th at Buenos Aires 1970 (Robert James Fischer won), and tied for 3rd-4th at Mar del Plata 1976 (Raúl Sanguinetti and Victor Brond won).

García played for Argentina in Chess Olympiads:

- In 1964, at second board in 16th Chess Olympiad in Tel Aviv (+7 –5 =6);
- In 1966, at first reserve board in 17th Chess Olympiad in Havana (+4 –2 =2);
- In 1968, at second reserve board in 18th Chess Olympiad in Lugano (+2 –2 =3);
- In 1972, at second board in 20th Chess Olympiad in Skopje (+5 –7 =9).

He was awarded the IM title in 1964.
