= Roger Ferry =

French chess player (1932–2019)

Personal information
- Born: 1 December 1932 Colombes, France
- Died: 19 October 2019 (aged 86) Colombes, France

Chess career
- Country: France
- Peak rating: 2320 (January 1988)

Roger Bernard Jean Ferry (1 December 1932 – 19 October 2019) was a French chess player, three times French Chess Championship medalist (1961, 1962, 1966).

== Biography ==
In 1960s Ferry was one of the leading French chess players. He took part in the individual French Chess Championship finals many times and won three bronze medals (1961, 1962, 1966).

Ferry played for France in the Chess Olympiads:

- In 1962, at first reserve board in the 15th Chess Olympiad in Varna (+3, =6, -2),
- In 1968, at first reserve board in the 18th Chess Olympiad in Lugano (+4, =3, -1).

He continued to participate in high-level competitions until the mid-2000s. Ferry died in Colombes on 19 October 2019, at the age of 86.
