= Uruguayan Chess Championship =

The Uruguayan Chess Championship (Campeonato Uruguayo de Ajedrez) is the national chess championship of Uruguay.

Year	Winner
1927	José Gabarain
1928	Héctor Anaya Oger
1929	Julio C. Balparda Muró
1931	Carlos Hounié Fleurquin
1934	Julio C. Balparda Muró
1935	Carlos Hounié Fleurquin
1936	Julio C. Balparda Muró
1937	Alfredo F. Olivera
1938	Ernesto J. Rotunno
1939	Ernesto J. Rotunno
1940	Arturo Liebstein
1941	José Cánepa
1942	Arturo Liebstein
1943	Arturo Liebstein
1944	Alfredo F. Olivera
1945	Lorenzo R. Bauzá
1946	Carlos Hounié Fleurquin
1947	Alfredo F. Olivera
1948	Luis Roux Cabral
1949	Santiago Trasmonte
1950	Lorenzo R. Bauzá
1951	Héctor Corral, Lorenzo R. Bauzá
1952	Santiago Trasmonte
1953	Walter Estrada Degrandi
1954	Lorenzo R. Bauzá
1955	Lorenzo R. Bauzá
1956	Fernando Rubio Aguado
1957	Alfredo F. Olivera
1958	Antonio Bachini
1959	Walter Estrada Degrandi
1960	Walter Estrada Degrandi
1961	Walter Estrada Degrandi
1962	Eduardo Etcheverry
1963	Alfredo F. Olivera
1964	Guillermo R. Puiggrós
1965	José Luis Alvarez del Monte
1966	Walter Estrada Degrandi
1967	Walter Estrada Degrandi
1968	José Luis Alvarez del Monte
1969	Pedro Lamas
1970	Luis Roux Cabral
1971	Roberto Silva Nazzari
1972	Pedro Lamas
1973	Walter Estrada Degrandi
1974	Otto Benítez
1975	Otto Benítez
1976	José Bademian
1977	Walter Estrada Degrandi
1978	Juan C. Viana
1979	Walter Estrada Degrandi
1980	Manuel Dienavorian
1981	Alejandro Bauzá
1982	Daniel Rivera
1983	Ivo Kurtic
1984	Bernardo Roselli Mailhe
1985	Daniel Rivera
1986	Bernardo Roselli Mailhe
1987	Manuel Dienavorian
1988	Enrique Almada
1989	Enrique Almada
1990	Bernardo Roselli Mailhe
1991	Daniel Perchman
1992	Daniel Izquierdo
1993	Bernardo Roselli Mailhe
1994	Bernardo Roselli Mailhe
1995	vacant (no match for the title, Roselli vs. Izquierdo)
1996	Jorge Brasó
1997	Alfonso Pérez
1998	Bernardo Roselli Mailhe
1999	Gabriel Curi
2000	Bernardo Roselli Mailhe
2001	Bernardo Roselli Mailhe
2002	Bernardo Roselli Mailhe
2003	Martín Crosa Coll
2004	Bernardo Roselli Mailhe
2005	Bernardo Roselli Mailhe
2006	Daniel Izquierdo
2007	Bernardo Roselli Mailhe
2008	Bernardo Roselli Mailhe
2009	Bernardo Roselli Mailhe
2010	Manuel Larrea
2011	Bernardo Roselli Mailhe
2012	Andrés Rodríguez
2013	Manuel Larrea
2014	Nicolas Lopez Azambuja
2015	Manuel Larrea
2016	Bernardo Roselli Mailhe
2017	Bernardo Roselli Mailhe
2018	Andrés Rodríguez
2019	Bernardo Roselli Mailhe
2020	Bernardo Roselli Mailhe
2021	Bernardo Roselli Mailhe
2022	Alejandro Hoffmann
2023	Bernardo Roselli Mailhe
2024	Andrés Rodríguez
