= José Agustín Bedoya =

Peruvian colonel (1826–1881)

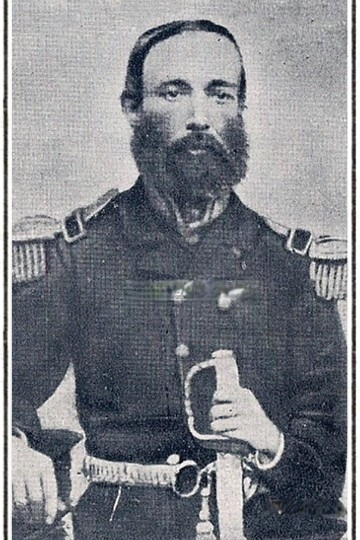
- Born: 5 May 1826; Ica, Department of Ica, Peru
- Died: 10 October 1881 (aged 55); Huacho, Department of Lima, Peru
- Burial place: Cementerio Presbítero Matías Maestro, Lima District, Peru
- Military career
- Allegiance: Peru
- Branch: Peruvian Army
- Service years: 1866–1881
- Rank: Coronel
- Conflicts: Chincha Islands War: Battle of Callao; War of the Pacific: Breña campaign; Battle of San Jerónimo

José Agustín Bedoya y Valle (5 May 1826 – 1881) was a Peruvian colonel of the War of the Pacific. Being a primary organizer of the Breña campaign, he led the Peruvian forces at the Battle of San Jerónimo.

== Biography ==
Bedoya was born on 5 May 1826 as the son of Francisco Bedoya y Rosa Valle de la Quitana. He would join the Peruvian Army and would distinguish himself during the Battle of Callao as a Captain during the Chincha Islands War. He would serve under Mariano Ignacio Prado and would form part of his corps of aides and then served as the prefect of the Department of Lambayeque. During the War of the Pacific, Bedoya would be stationed for the defense of Lima and was promoted to Colonel. He then met up with Nicolás de Piérola and was made prefect of Lima on 29 January 1881 but the city had already been occupied by the Chilean forces by then. He would then retreat for the Huarochirí Province as he was assigned with organizing the army there. He would accompany Major Manuel Bedoya (no relation), Captains Raimundo Mariscal and Andrés España, Lieutenants Ignacio A. Benavides, Jorge Buckingham and Francisco N. Rivero, and Second Lieutenant Eulalrio Reuna.

While at Huarochirí, he would divide the local forces into two columns, a left column under the command of Colonel Juan Onetti and the right column under the command of Colonel Francisco B. Segura. Bedoya would also boost the morale of the local populace, encouraging them to continue the resistance, organized intel and security through the local Quechua who were eager to lend support, seized local weapons for volunteers and appointed authorities in Canta. After Francisco García Calderón controversially assumed presidency of Peru, he suggested that Bedoya united his forces with the rest of the Peruvian Army but he would continue to build up his own men. He then found himself on the defense upon the Chilean invasion during the Battle of San Jerónimo where despite his forces being outnumbered, Bedoya would repel the initial Chilean forces until being forced to retreat upon the arrival of Chilean reinforcements.

He would then organize the 1st and 2nd Canta Infantry Battalions and directed them towards the Sayán District. He would also constitute the Carabineros de Chancay squadron as well as the 1st and 2nd Alianza Battalions which would mark the foundations of the Cazadores del Rímac. These battalions were tasked with mustering up a powerful enough army to face the Chilean forces on the battlefield. While he was at Huacho, Bedoya would unexpectedly die from a heart attack on 10 October 1881. He was married to Doña María Ignacia Suárez and would have several children with her, one of them being future general and senator Augusto Bedoya Suárez.
