= Frode Søby =

Danish chess player

Personal information
- Born: 16 April 1935 (age 91)

Chess career
- Country: Denmark
- Peak rating: 1966 (July 2003)

Frode Søby (born 16 April 1935), is a Danish chess player.

== Chess career ==
During the 1960s, Frode Søby was one of the leading Danish chess players. He participated in the finals of Danish Chess Championships and attained his best result in 1962, finishing seventh.

Frode Søby played for Denmark in the Chess Olympiad:

- In 1962, at fourth board in the 15th Chess Olympiad in Varna (+4, =3, -8).

Since the mid-1970s, Søby has rarely played serious chess. Since the early 1990s, he has played mainly in Danish team competitions.
