= Paul Klein (chess player) =

German-Ecuadorian chess player (1915–1992)

Paul Klein (23 November 1915, Cologne, German Empire – 20 March 1992) was a German–Ecuadorian chess master and arbiter.

Born in Germany, he emigrated to South America because of Nazi policy. Klein played for Ecuador in the 14th Chess Olympiad at Leipzig 1960.

Awarded the International Arbiter title, he was a Head Referee in the 23rd Chess Olympiad, and in the 8th Women's Chess Olympiad, both at Buenos Aires 1978. He was also the head referee at the World Chess Championship rematch between Anatoly Karpov and Viktor Korchnoi at Merano 1981.
