= Åke Olsson (chess player) =

Swedish chess player (1934–2009)

Personal information
- Born: 3 May 1934
- Died: 11 September 2009 (aged 75)

Chess career
- Country: Sweden

Åke Olsson (3 May 1934 – 11 September 2009) was a Swedish chess player, two-times Swedish Chess Championship medalist (1962, 1966, 1969, 1971).

== Biography ==
In 1952, Olsson won Swedish Youth Chess Championship. In the 1960s and 1970s he was one of the leading Swedish chess players. In 1969, Olsson shared 1st-2nd place with Ulf Andersson and Börje Jansson in Swedish Chess Championship, but lost in additional tournament. Also he won silver medal in this tournament in 1962, 1966 and 1971.

Olsson played for Sweden in the Chess Olympiads:

- In 1962, at first reserve board in the 15th Chess Olympiad in Varna (+8, =2, -4),
- In 1968, at first reserve board in the 18th Chess Olympiad in Lugano (+6, =5, -3),
- In 1970, at second reserve board in the 19th Chess Olympiad in Siegen (+4, =2, -6),
- In 1972, at first reserve board in the 20th Chess Olympiad in Skopje (+3, =5, -5).

Olsson played for Sweden in the World Student Team Chess Championship:

- In 1960, at second board in the 7th World Student Team Chess Championship in Leningrad (+3, =3, -7).

Olsson played for Sweden in the Nordic Chess Cup:

- In 1970, at second board in the 1st Nordic Chess Cup in Großenbrode (+1, =2, -0) and won team silver and individual gold medals.

Olsson died on 11 September 2009, at the age of 75.
