= Alfredo Olivera =

Uruguayan chess player

Personal information
- Born: 9 March 1908
- Died: unknown

Chess career
- Country: Uruguay

Alfredo F. Olivera (9 March 1908 – unknown) was a Uruguayan chess player, five-time Uruguayan Chess Championship winner (1937, 1944, 1947, 1957, 1963).

== Biography ==
From the late 1930s to the mid-1960s, Alfredo Olivera was one of the leading Uruguayan chess players. He was participated multiple times in the Uruguayan Chess Championships, where he won the title in 1937, 1944, 1947, 1957, and 1963. Alfredo Olivera also participated in a number of major international tournaments: Montevideo (1938, 1939, 1941, 1953, 1956, 1959), Mar del Plata (1948, 1956, 1958), Hollywood (1945), Atlántida (1960).

Alfredo Olivera played for Uruguay in the Chess Olympiads:

- In 1939, at reserve board in the 8th Chess Olympiad in Buenos Aires (+10, =0, -5),
- In 1966, at third board in the 17th Chess Olympiad in Havana (+5, =5, -10).

Famous Danish chess grandmaster Bent Larsen spoke about Olivera as «cosy fatboy, who for many years won the Uruguayan Championship whenever he participated».
