= José Luis Alvarez del Monte =

Uruguayan chess player (1931–1996)

Personal information
- Born: 16 February 1931
- Died: 1996

Chess career
- Country: Uruguay

José Luis Alvarez del Monte (16 February 1931 – 1995) was a Uruguayan chess player, who twice won the Uruguayan Chess Championship (1965, 1968).

== Biography ==
In the 1960s José Luis Alvarez del Monte was one of the leading Uruguayan chess players. He twice won Uruguayan Chess Championships: 1965, and 1968. In 1961, he won silver medal in this tournament. José Luis Alvarez del Monte two times participated in World Chess Championship South American Zonal tournaments (1966, 1969) and once in Pan American Chess Championship (1966).

José Luis Alvarez del Monte played for Uruguay in the Chess Olympiads:

- In 1962, at third board in the 15th Chess Olympiad in Varna (+5, =5, -6),
- In 1964, at second board in the 16th Chess Olympiad in Tel Aviv (+5, =4, -4),
- In 1966, at first board in the 17th Chess Olympiad in Havana (+6, =10, -4).
