= Pedro Lamas Baliero =

Uruguayan chess player (1941–2024)

Personal information
- Born: 1941
- Died: February 2024 (aged 82) Uruguay

Chess career
- Country: Uruguay

Pedro Lamas Baliero (1941 – February 2024) was a Uruguayan chess player, two-time Uruguayan Chess Championship winner (1969, 1972).

== Biography ==
Pedro Lamas Baliero was born in 1941. From the end of the 1960s to beginning of the 1990s, Pedro Lamas Baliero was one of the leading Uruguayan chess players. He twice won Uruguayan Chess Championships: 1969, and 1972. In 1972, in Havana Pedro Lamas Baliero participated in 7th Pan American Chess Championship and finished in the 9th place.

Lamas Baliero played for Uruguay in the Chess Olympiads:

- In 1974, at first board in the 21st Chess Olympiad in Nice (+4, =3, -10),
- In 1978, at first reserve board in the 23rd Chess Olympiad in Buenos Aires (+2, =6, -1),
- In 1988, at second reserve board in the 28th Chess Olympiad in Thessaloniki (+1, =3, -1),
- In 1990, at second reserve board in the 29th Chess Olympiad in Novi Sad (+1, =5, -1).

Lamas Baliero played for Uruguay in the Pan American Team Chess Championships:

- In 1971, at second board in the 1st Panamerican Team Chess Championship in Tucuman (+0, =2, -4),
- In 1987, at fourth board in the 3rd Panamerican Team Chess Championship in Junín (+2, =3, -3).

Lamas Baliero played for Uruguay in the South American Team Chess Championship:

- In 1989, at third board in the 1st South American Team Chess Championship in Mar del Plata (+1, =2, -0).

Lamas Baliero died in February 2024, at the age of 82.
