= Sven Buskenström =

Swedish chess player

Personal information
- Born: 27 February 1919
- Died: 11 March 1963 (aged 44)

Chess career
- Country: Sweden

Sven Ingvar Buskenström (27 February 1919 - 11 March 1963) was a Swedish chess player, Swedish Chess Championship medalist (1962).

== Biography ==
From the end 1950s to the start 1960s Sven Buskenström was one of the strongest chess players in Sweden. He participated in Swedish Chess Championship and won bronze medal in 1962. In 1963, Sven Buskenström participated in Stockholm International Chess tournament.

Sven Buskenström played for Sweden in the Chess Olympiads:

- In 1960, at second reserve board in the 14th Chess Olympiad in Leipzig (+5, =2, -2),
- In 1962, at fourth board in the 15th Chess Olympiad in Varna (+5, =3, -5).
