= Gilberto García (chess player) =

Cuban chess player

Personal information
- Born: 2 September 1919
- Died: unknown

Chess career
- Country: Cuba

Gilberto García (2 September 1919 – unknown) was a Cuban chess player.

== Biography ==
From the 1940s to the 1960s Gilberto Garcia was one of the leading Cuban chess players. In 1947, he won the International Chess Tournament City of Havana ahead of Donald Byrne and Edward Lasker. In 1963, in Havana Gilberto Garcia participated in the Pan American Chess Championship and ranked in 12th place. In the same year he participated in World Chess Championship Central American Zonal tournament and ranked in 7th place.

Gilberto Garcia played for Cuba in the Chess Olympiads:

- In 1960, at fourth board in the 14th Chess Olympiad in Leipzig (+3, =4, -4),
- In 1962, at third board in the 15th Chess Olympiad in Varna (+4, =3, -11),
- In 1964, at first reserve board in the 16th Chess Olympiad in Tel Aviv (+2, =3, -3).

In 2019, in honor of the centenary Gilberto Garcia memorial tournaments are held in Cuba.
