= Arturo Liebstein =

Uruguayan chess player

Arturo Liebstein, sometimes listed as Isaac Liebstein, was a Uruguayan chess master.

He won thrice in the Uruguayan Chess Championship in 1940, 1942, and 1943. He tied for 9–11th at Montevideo 1941, took 13th in the Mar del Plata chess tournament in 1943 (Miguel Najdorf won), took 15th at Mar del Plata 1944 (Herman Pilnik and Najdorf won), and tied for 14–16th at Mar del Plata/Buenos Aires 1951 (zonal, the South American Chess Championship, Eliskases and Julio Bolbochán won).
