= Bernardo Roselli =

Uruguayan chess player (born 1965)

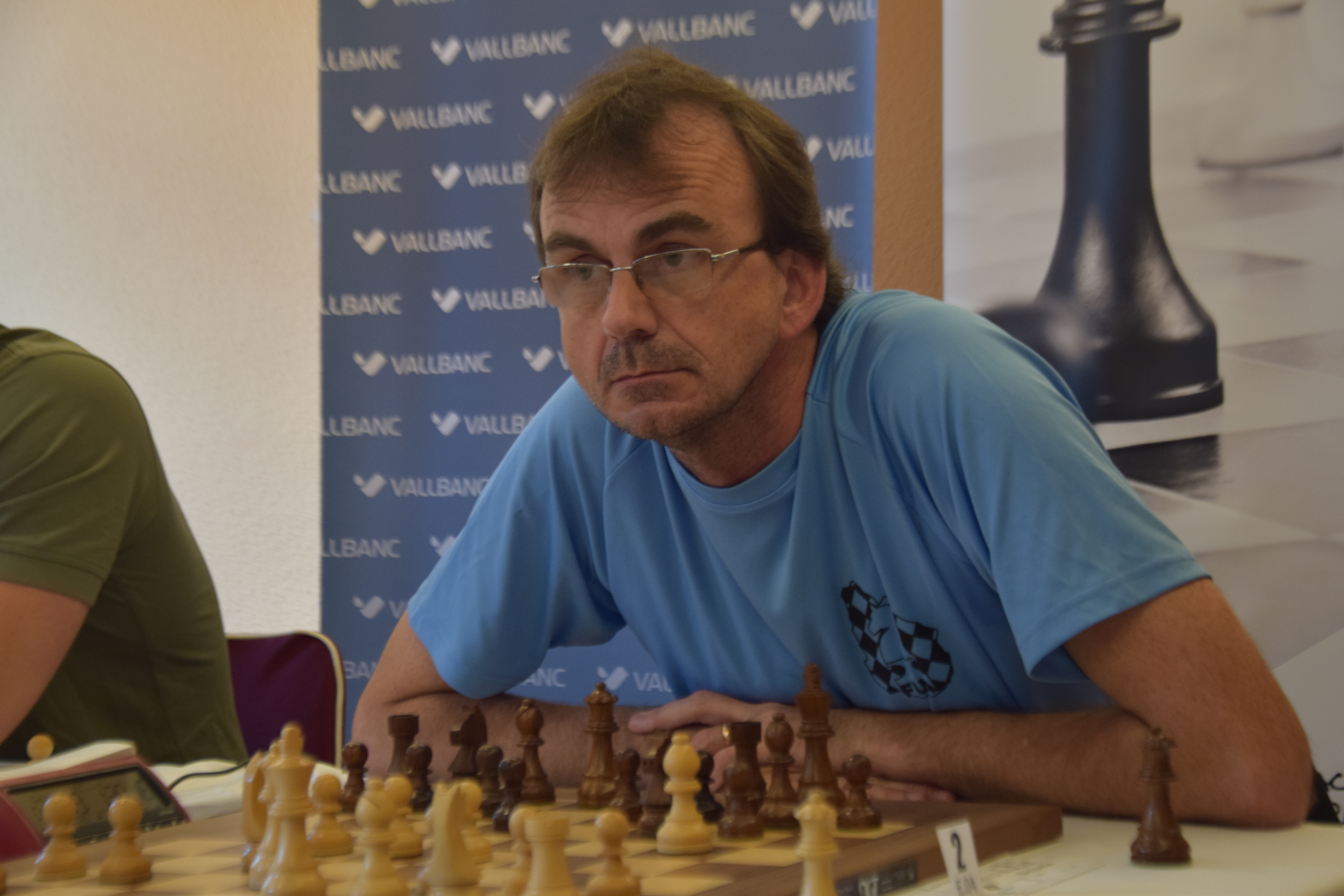
- Roselli at the 2019 Andorra open

Personal information
- Born: Bernardo Roselli Mailhe; 17 September 1965 (age 60) Carmelo, Uruguay

Chess career
- Country: Uruguay
- Title: International Master (1994)
- Peak rating: 2471 (May 2019)

Bernardo Roselli Mailhe (born 17 September 1965) is a Uruguayan chess player. He received the FIDE title of International Master (IM) in 1994.

He won the Uruguayan Chess Championship thirteen times between 1984 and 2008, and represented Uruguay at the Chess Olympiad eleven times (1986–2014). At the beginning of his career, he took 15th place at Corrientes 1985 (the 12th South American zonal tournament).

Roselli took first place in the fifth edition of República Argentina Chess Master in 2002, ahead of German computer program Hiarcs 8.0.
