= Khalzan, Sükhbaatar =

District in Sükhbaatar Province, Mongolia

Coordinates: 46°09′56″N 112°57′04″E

Khalzan District Халзан сум ᠬᠠᠯᠵᠠᠨᠰᠤᠮᠤ
- District
- Interactive map of Khalzan District
- Country: Mongolia
- Province: Sükhbaatar Province
- Time zone: UTC+8 (UTC + 8)

Khalzan (Mongolian: Халзан) is a sum (district) of Sükhbaatar Province in eastern Mongolia. In 2020, its population was 1,751.

== Administrative divisions ==
The district is divided into four bags, which are:

- Khalzan Shand
- Khatavch
- Sainshand
- Sakhiul Shand

== Notable natives ==
- Gonchigiin Chalkhaasüren, chess player
