= Jan Svenneby =

Norwegian chess player (1936–2012)

Personal information
- Born: 2 October 1936
- Died: 15 February 2012 (aged 75)

Chess career
- Country: Norway

Jan Ivar Svenneby (2 October 1936 – 15 February 2012) was a Norwegian chess player.

== Biography ==
In the late 1950s and early 1960s, Svenneby was one of the leading junior Norwegian chess players. In 1955, he won the Norwegian Junior Chess Championship.

Svenneby played for Norway in the Chess Olympiad:

- In 1960, at first reserve board in the 14th Chess Olympiad in Leipzig (+1, =2, -1).

Svenneby also successfully played in correspondence chess tournaments. In 1968, he won third place in the third European Correspondence Chess Championship.
