= Gheorghe Mititelu =

Romanian chess player (1934–1995)

Personal information
- Born: 30 October 1934
- Died: 1995 (aged 60)

Chess career
- Country: Romania

Gheorghe Mititelu (30 October 1934 – 1995) was a Romanian chess player.

== Biography ==
From the late 1950s to the early 1970s, Gheorghe Mititelu was one of the leading Romanian chess players. He was a multiple participant in the Romanian Chess Championships, where he achieved his best in 1974 when he finished 2nd.

Mititelu played for Romania in the Chess Olympiads:

- In 1960, at fourth board in the 14th Chess Olympiad in Leipzig (+6, =3, -7),
- In 1964, at first reserve board in the 16th Chess Olympiad in Tel Aviv (+1, =3, -2),
- In 1970, at first reserve board in the 19th Chess Olympiad in Siegen (+2, =4, -1).

Mititelu played for Romania in the European Team Chess Championship:

- In 1973, at sixt board in the 5th European Team Chess Championship in Bath (+1, =3, -2).

Mititelu played for Romania in the World Student Team Chess Championships:

- In 1957, at first board in the 4th World Student Team Chess Championship in Reykjavík (+1, =4, -5),
- In 1958, at first board in the 5th World Student Team Chess Championship in Varna (+2, =3, -2),
- In 1960, at first board in the 7th World Student Team Chess Championship in Leningrad (+3, =6, -3).

Mititelu died in 1995, at the age of 60.
