= Carlos Hounié Fleurquin =

Uruguayan chess player (1906–1962)

Personal information
- Born: 10 November 1906
- Died: 1962

Chess career
- Country: Uruguay

Carlos Hounié Fleurquin (10 November 1906 – 1962) was a Uruguayan chess player, two-time Uruguayan Chess Championship winner (1935, 1946).

== Biography ==
From the early 1930s to the end of the 1940s, Carlos Hounié Fleurquin was one of the leading Uruguayan chess players. He participated multiple times in the Uruguayan Chess Championships, where he won the title in 1935 and 1946. He was participant in three South American Chess Championships in a row (1934, 1934/1935, 1936). Also Carlos Hounié Fleurquin was participant of a number of major international tournaments: Montevideo (1939, 1961), Mar del Plata (1945, 1947).

Carlos Hounié Fleurquin played for Uruguay in the Chess Olympiad:

- In 1939, at second board in the 8th Chess Olympiad in Buenos Aires (+8, =3, -5).
