= José Miguel Rodríguez Espinosa =

Spanish astronomer

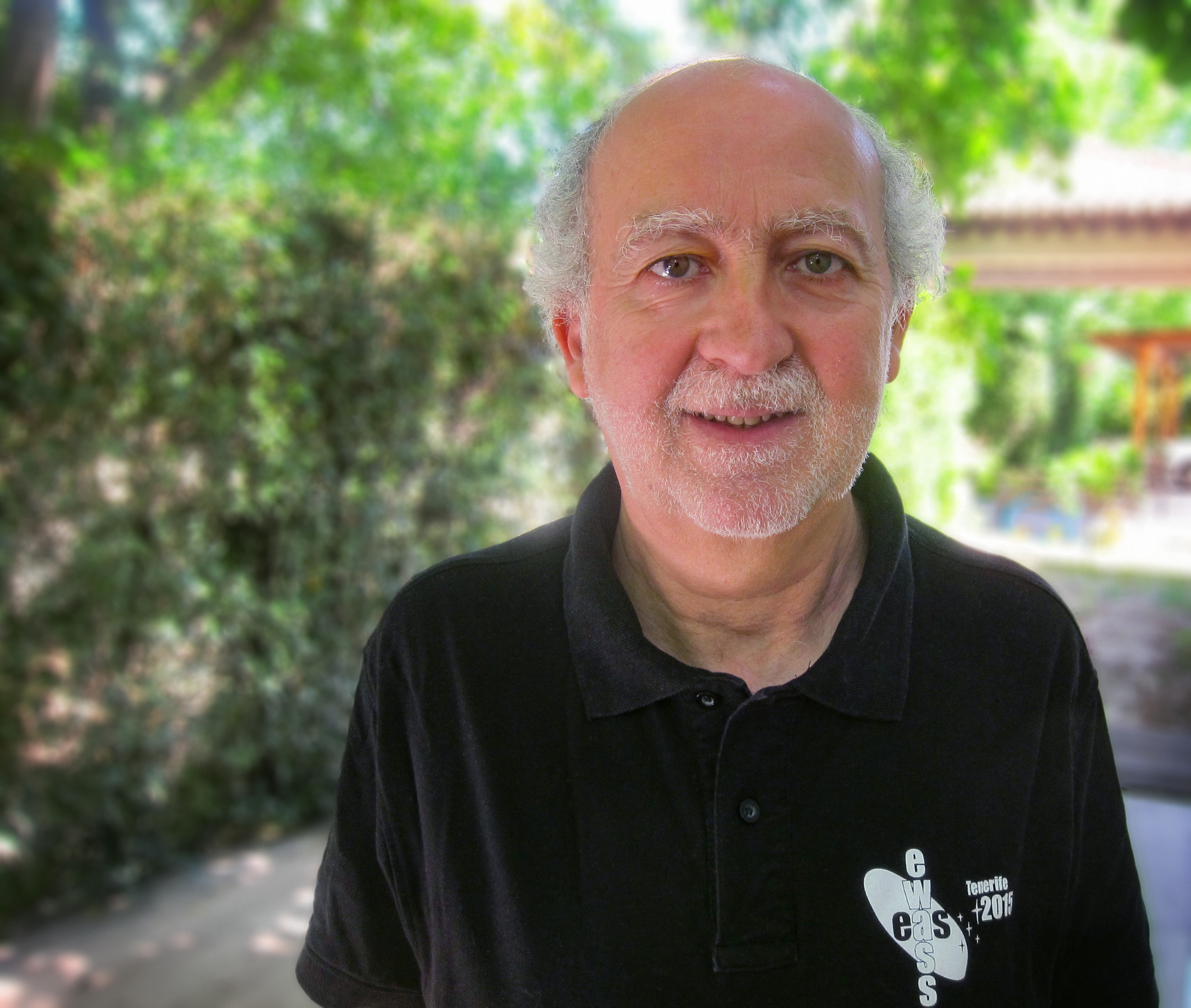
- Born: Granada
- Position held: Assistant general secretary of the International Astronomical Union (2019–2021), secretary (2021–2023)

José Miguel Rodríguez Espinosa is a Spanish astronomer working in particular in the field of active galaxies, star formation and the high redshift universe as well as in instrumentation. From September 1, 2019, to 2021, he was the Assistant Secretary General of the International Astronomical Union, replacing Ian Robson. He was the Secretary General of the Union for the 2021-2024 triennium, he stepped down from this role in 2023.
