= José Miguel Ridameya Tatche =

Spanish chess player

Personal information
- Born: 7 July 1929
- Died: 25 June 2015 (aged 85)

Chess career
- Country: Spain
- Peak rating: 2355 (July 1992)

José Miguel Ridameya Tatche (7 July 1929 – 25 June 2015) was a Spanish chess player, Catalan Senior Chess Championships winner (1996, 1997).

== Biography ==
In the 1960s and 1970s, José Miguel Ridameya Tatche was one of Spain's leading chess players. In 1960, in Terrassa he ranked 3rd in International Chess tournament. He was runner-up in the 1970 Venice International Open Chess Tournament.

José Miguel Ridameya Tatche played for Spain in the Chess Olympiad:

- In 1962, at first reserve board in the 15th Chess Olympiad in Varna (+4, =6, -2).

For a long time he left chess and devoted himself to his profession in the world of banking. José Miguel Ridameya Tatche had also excelled in the veterans chess championships. He twice won the first place title of the Catalan Senior Chess Championship in 1996 and 1997.
