= Arelo C. Sederberg =

American journalist (1930–2020)

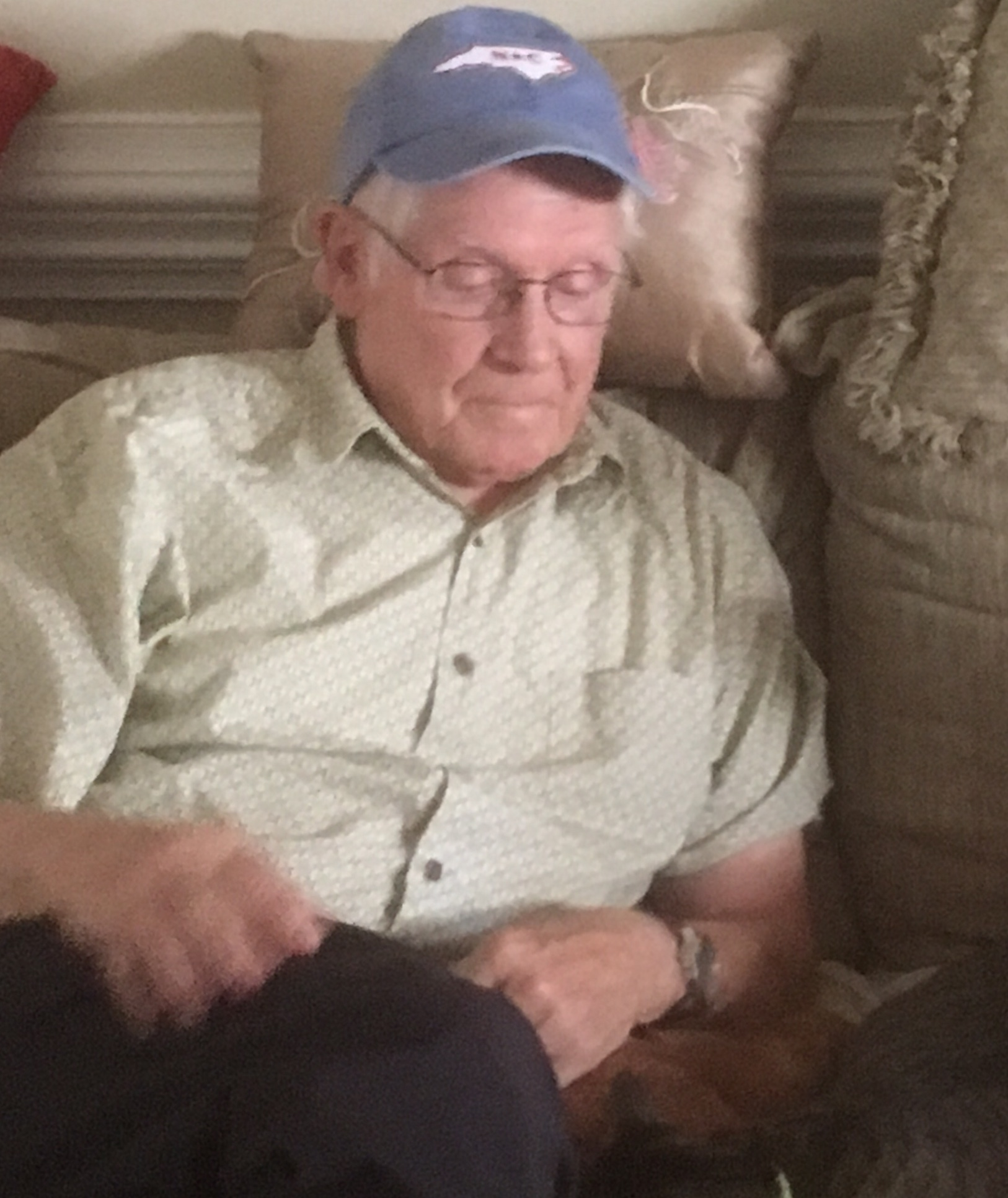

Arelo Charles Sederberg (May 17, 1930 – March 20, 2020) was a widely-read financial journalist, television commentator, public relations executive and novelist, best known for being the sole spokesman for billionaire Howard Hughes at the time of Hughes' death in 1976.

== Early life and education ==
Sederberg was born on May 17, 1930, in Minneapolis, Minnesota, the son of Charles Sederberg, a farmer, and Agnes Engquist Sederberg. He attended South High School in Minneapolis, Minnesota before moving to California. He graduated from California State University at Los Angeles with a degree in English. As a corporal in the First Cavalry Division of the U.S. Army in 1951–52, he served as a personnel clerk in a field artillery battalion in Korea, and on the Japanese island of Hokkaido.

== Career ==
After his stint in the Army, Sederberg went to work as a reporter with the Los Angeles Times, gaining particular experience writing about the West Coast business scene. He was tapped by the Times to serve as a financial writer on the newspaper's tabloid spinoff, the Mirror-News, until the closure of that publication. Rejoining the Times in 1962, the following year Sederberg was sent by the Times to New York to serve as the Los Angeles Times' first East Coast financial correspondent and head of the newspaper's Wall Street bureau. Sederberg's columns on West Coast business and the national economy were published across the country throughout the 1960s.

In 1970, Sederberg left the Times to join the well-known Los Angeles public relations firm of Carl Byoir & Associates, where his principal client became the reclusive billionaire Howard Hughes. Along with his senior colleague at Byoir, Dick Hannah, Sederberg helped to arrange Hughes' bizarre public phone interview on January 9, 1972, in which Hughes, from an undisclosed location in the Bahamas, took questions over a speakerphone from familiar reporters in order to prove that Clifford Irving's alleged authorized biography of Hughes was a fraud.

Sederberg was later the face of the Hughes organization, known as Summa Corp., at the time of Hughes' death, and during the unraveling of his estate, addressing the media on behalf of the organization on the search for a legitimate will left by Hughes and the confusion that followed over the sudden appearance of the handwritten "Mormon Will" that gave $156 million of his $1.56 billion estate to gas station owner Melvin Dummar; the operations of Summa Corp. without its deceased chairman and stockholder; the disposition of Hughes' Spruce Goose seaplane; and the indictment of one of Hughes' long-time aides for conspiring to provide Hughes with illegal drugs. Of the over 30 alleged wills that surfaced after Hughes' death, Sederberg asserted, "Most of the wills are crank jokes or sloppy attempts to hijack the empire." Courts later ruled that Hughes died without a will. Sederberg documented his time with the Hughes organization in a memoir, Hughesworld: The Strange Life and Death of an American Legend (2013).

After leaving Byoir, Sederberg wrote financial columns for the Hearst Syndicate and appeared as a daily commentator and managing editor on the Financial News Network, an early cable television business network, before it was acquired by CNBC in 1991. As a financial reporter, he showed extraordinary prescience in anticipating trends: in a column for the Los Angeles Times in 1967, he pondered a "checkless, even moneyless society, made possible by the advent of the computer"; and in a 1979 interview with Dennis Stanfill, president and chief executive of 20th Century Fox Corp., Sederberg suggested that the Los Angeles Dodgers might be a logical acquisition target for Fox, presaging a wave of team acquisitions by media conglomerates. Stanfill said no; but under the ownership of Rupert Murdoch, Fox acquired the Dodgers in 1998.

== As writer ==
In addition to his Hughes' memoir, Sederberg wrote over a dozen novels, including The Kingmakers (1984), about a fictional Los Angeles newspaper family, and Zora (1989), a revenge story concerning the Armenian genocide. His best known novel is The Power Players (1979), about which the Los Angeles Times observed, "Sederberg has much to reveal about the clandestine workings of multinational conglomerates, and the men who run them." The Washington Post was also appreciative of the novel, saying that "Sederberg understands people and how to write about them," and The New York Times called the book "more fun and certainly more plausible than [Sidney] Sheldon's recent and impenetrable 'Bloodline.'" Sederberg also wrote a handbook for stock investment clubs and a history of the bombing of the Los Angeles Times by pro-labor anarchists in 1910.

== Selected works ==
- The Stock Market Investment Club Handbook (1971)
- A Collection for J.L., a novel of crisis (1973)
- 60 Hours of Darkness: a novel of terror in Las Vegas (1974; also known as Casino)
- How to Kidnap a Millionaire (1974)
- The Power Players: a novel (1979)
- The Kingmakers: a novel (1984)
- Zora (1989)
- Hollywood Graffiti (1990)
- Scarlet Summer (2000)
- Lanterns in the Dawn: a novel (2000)
- The Sleepwalkers Below the Hill (2001)
- So Long a Life (2001)
- The Dynamite Conspiracy (2001)
- Murder Most Foul: Violence in the Classics (2001)
- The Girl Who Saved Baseball (2004)
- Dead Night on the Beat: And Other Stories (2004)
- Country Music And Other Stories (2006)
- Stockholm (2013)
- Hughesworld: The Strange Life and Death of an American Legend (2013)

== Death ==
Arelo Sederberg, who was married three times and had one son, died on March 20, 2020, in Oakland, California, at the age of 89.
