= Ernesto Rotunno =

Uruguayan chess player

Personal information
- Born: unknown
- Died: unknown

Chess career
- Country: Uruguay

Ernesto J. Rotunno (unknown – unknown) was a Uruguayan chess player, two-time Uruguayan Chess Championship winner (1938, 1939).

== Biography ==
Ernesto Rotunno was one of the leading Uruguayan chess players at the end of the 1930s. He won the Uruguayan Chess Championships twice in a row, in 1938 and 1939, and participated in Montevideo 1938 chess tournament which happened as South American Chess Championship (tournament won by World Chess Champion Alexander Alekhine).

Ernesto Rotunno played for Uruguay in the Chess Olympiad:

- In 1939, at first board in the 8th Chess Olympiad in Buenos Aires (+3, =5, -4).

In 1954, Ernesto Rotunno participated in the match against the Soviet Union as a member of the Uruguayan national team.
