= Berndt Söderborg =

Swedish chess player (1933–2024)

Personal information
- Born: 13 August 1933
- Died: 29 March 2024 (aged 90)

Chess career
- Country: Sweden
- Title: International Arbiter (1993)
- Peak rating: 2152 (January 2008)

Berndt Söderborg (13 August 1933 – 29 March 2024) was a Swedish chess player and International Arbiter (1993).

== Biography ==
Berndt Söderborg was one of the strongest chess players in Sweden in the late 1950s and early 1960s. He participated in several Swedish Chess Championships. Also Berndt Söderborg was participant of the Stockholm International chess tournaments in 1962 and 1963. In the 1962 tournament he shared 2nd-3rd places with Grandmaster (GM) Salo Flohr.

Berndt Söderborg played for Sweden in the Chess Olympiad:

- In 1962, at second reserve board in the 15th Chess Olympiad in Varna (+2, =9, -0).

Berndt Söderborg played for Sweden in the World Student Team Chess Championships:

- In 1955, at second reserve board in the 2nd World Student Team Chess Championship in Lyon (+2, =3, -3),
- In 1956, at second board in the 3rd World Student Team Chess Championship in Uppsala (+0, =3, -5),
- In 1957, at first board in the 4th World Student Team Chess Championship in Reykjavík (+3, =5, -5),
- In 1958, at first board in the 5th World Student Team Chess Championship in Varna (+0, =1, -7),
- In 1959, at first board in the 6th World Student Team Chess Championship in Budapest (+2, =4, -4),
- In 1960, at first board in the 7th World Student Team Chess Championship in Leningrad (+2, =2, -6),
- In 1961, at third board in the 8th World Student Team Chess Championship in Helsinki (+0, =1, -7).

In the 1990s and 2000s Berndt Söderborg played in senior chess tournaments. In 2001 he became the silver medalist of the Swedish Senior Chess championship, and in 2003 he won this championship.
