= José Miguel Alcérreca =

Chilean military officer (1845–1891)

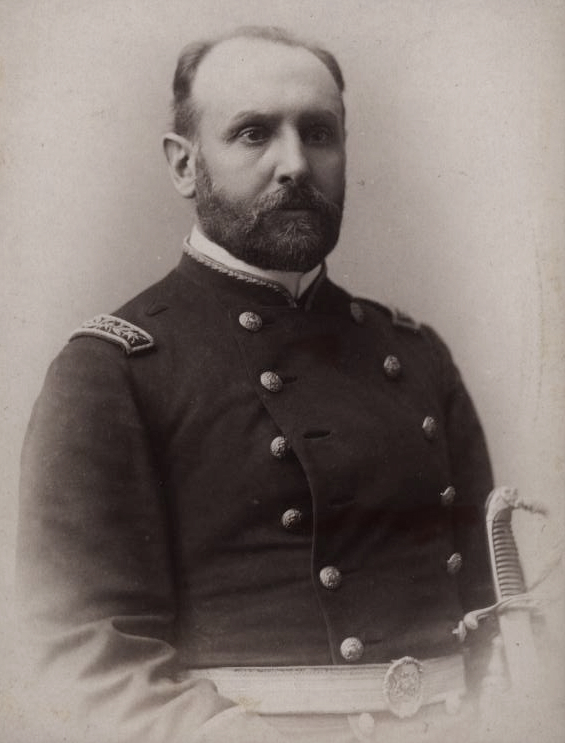
- Born: José Miguel Alcérreca Saldes; 7 May 1845; Santiago, Chile
- Died: 21 August 1891 (aged 46); Placilla, Chile
- Education: Military School of the Liberator Bernardo O'Higgins
- Military career
- Allegiance: Chile
- Branch: Chilean Army
- Rank: General
- Conflicts: War of the Pacific; Chilean Civil War of 1891

José Miguel Alcérreca Saldes (7 May 1845 – 21 August 1891) was a Chilean military officer. He participated in the War of the Pacific and in the Chilean Civil War of 1891 where he was killed in action at the Battle of Placilla fighting for President José Manuel Balmaceda.

== Eponym ==
The town of Coronel Alcérreca in the municipality of General Lagos in the Arica and Parinacota Region bears his name.

== Ranks ==
- 1865 : Second Lieutenant
- 1868 : Lieutenant
- 1872 : Captain
- 1880 : Major
- 1880 : Lieutenant Colonel
- 1887 : Colonel
- 1891 : Brigadier General
