= Alberto Foguelman =

Argentine chess player (1923–2013)

Alberto Foguelman (13 October 1923 in Buenos Aires – 9 December 2013 in Buenos Aires) was an Argentine chess master.

He was a member of Círculo de Ajedrez de Villa del Parque de Buenos Aires, since 1945. He played many times in Argentine Chess Championship (1953–1976), and twice shared 2nd: in 1959 (Bernardo Wexler won) and in 1962 (Raúl Sanguineti won). His best achievement was 3rd, after Vasily Smyslov and Efim Geller, at Santiago de Chile 1965. He also took 2nd place, behind Héctor Rossetto, at Fortaleza 1963 (zonal), tied for 17-19th at Amsterdam 1964 (interzonal), and shared 1st with Henrique Mecking, Julio Bolbochán and Oscar Panno at Rio Hondo 1966 (zonal).

In other tournaments, he won at Buenos Aires (La Régence) 1959, won at Quilmes 1959, tied for 9-11th at Belgrad 1962 (Svetozar Gligorić won), tied for 3rd-4th at Mar del Plata 1962 (Torneo Latinoamericano, Raimundo García won), tied for 3rd-5th at Havana 1963 (Pan American-ch, Eleazar Jiménez won), took 5th at Chacabuco 1965 (Jorge Pelikán won), and shared 5th at Mar del Plata 1967 (Open, Miguel Najdorf won).

Foguelman represented Argentina in Chess Olympiads:

- In 1960 at second reserve board in 14th Olympiad in Leipzig (+5 –4 =1);
- In 1962 at second reserve board in 15th Olympiad in Varna (+4 –0 =2), and won team bronze medal.

He was awarded the International Master title in 1963.
