= 2024 Bolivarian Games =

Multi-sport event to be held in Ayacucho, Peru

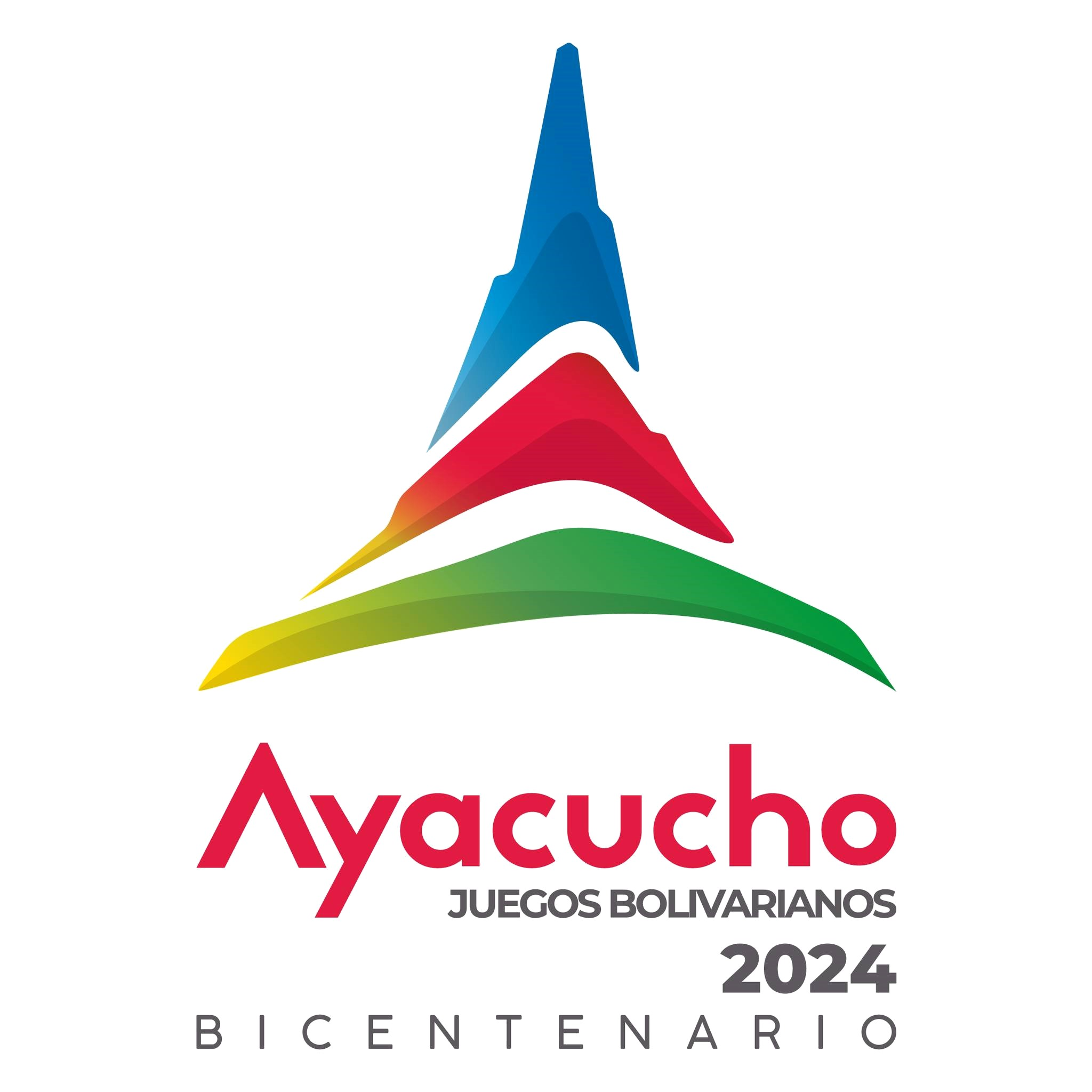
- Logo of the 2024 Bolivarian Games
- Host city: Ayacucho, Peru
- Motto: Bolivarian Games For All; Spanish: Juegos Bolivarianos Para Todos
- Nations: 10
- Events: 25 Sports
- Opening: 29 November
- Closing: 8 December
- Opened by: President Dina Boluarte
- Main venue: Estadio Las Américas
- Website: www.bolivarianos2024.pe

The 2024 Bolivarian Games, officially 2024 Bicentennial Bolivarian Games (Spanish: Juegos Bolivarianos del Bicentenario 2024), was the 20th edition of the multi-sport event meant for sports, or disciplines or events within a sport, that are not contested in the Olympic Games, governed by the Organización Deportiva Bolivariana (ODEBO). The event will be held in Ayacucho, and Lima, Peru from 29 November to 8 December 2024 in commemoration of the bicentennial of Battle of Ayacucho.

The Games were originally planned to be held between 6 and 15 December 2024. However, the Government of Peru set the dates of the event from 29 November to 9 December 2024, with the closing day coinciding with the 200th anniversary of the Battle of Ayacucho.

== Host city selection ==
In June 2021, the mayor of Ayacucho Yuri Gutiérrez presented to the Peruvian Olympic Committee the intentions of the city to host the 2025 Bolivarian Games. On 29 July 2021, during the swearing-in of President Pedro Castillo, the Governor of Ayacucho department Carlos Rúa confirmed the intentions of the city to host the 2025 Bolivarian Games, on the occasion of the 200th anniversary of the Battle of Ayacucho.

The final bidding was presented on 18 December 2021 at the ODEBO General Assembly held in Guayaquil, Ecuador, a city that also presented a bidding to host the 2025 Bolivarian Games. On the same day, the ODEBO Executive Committee selected Ayacucho to host a special and unprecedented edition of the Bolivarian Games for non-Olympic events in some sports, and named Guayaquil as host city for the 2025 Bolivarian Games.

== The Games ==
=== Participating National Olympic Committees ===
All 7 ODEBO's National Olympic Committees (NOCs) and 3 invited NOCs will compete in these games.

ODEBO nations

- Bolivia (107)
- Chile (153)
- Colombia (161)
- Ecuador (84)
- Panama (79)
- Peru (199) – Host
- Venezuela (132)

Invited nations

- El Salvador (19)
- Guatemala (138)
- Dominican Republic (57)

=== Sports ===
Ayacucho 2024 proposed an initial program of 25 sports in 35 disciplines (of these 25, only 4 are on the Olympic program: 3x3 Basketball, Weightlifting, Taekwondo and Rugby sevens). The 2024 Bolivarian Games final program maintained the number of sports at 25 but with the following changes: Canoeing (in Slalom and Rafting), Dancesport, Duathlon, Racquetball, Sport climbing, Aeromodeling and Teqball were dropped from the initial program while Cycling, Esports, Kickboxing, Muaythai and Softball were added to the final program. Half Marathon was replaced by the Long-distance 4 × 9000 metres relay.

The numbers in parentheses indicate the number of medal events contested in each sports discipline.

- 3x3 basketball (2)
- Aerobic gymnastics (6)
- Athletics
  - Cross country running (2)
  - Half marathon mixed relay (1)
- Basque Pelota (7)
- Bocce (6)
- Chess (10)
- Cue sports (8)
- Cycling
  - BMX freestyle (2)
  - Mountain biking (4)
- Dominoes (5)
- Esports (4)
- Futsal (1)
- Indoor rowing (8)
- Karate (8)
- Kickboxing (8)
- Muay Thai (8)
- Powerlifting (24)
- Roller sports
  - Inline speed skating (8)
  - Skateboarding (2)
- Rugby sevens (2)
- Softball (1)
- Taekwondo (6)
- Weightlifting (20)
- Wushu (11)

== Calendar ==
The sports program is as follows.

OC	Opening ceremony	●	Event competitions	1	Medal events	CC	Closing ceremony

November/December		27 Fri	28 Sat	29 Sun	30 Mon	1 Tue	2 Wed	3 Thu	4 Fri	5 Sat	6 Sun	7 Mon	8 Tue	Medal Events
Ceremonies (opening / closing)		OC											CC	—N/a
3x3 basketball		●	●	2										2
Aerobic gymnastics											●	●	6	6
Athletics				2		1								3
Basque pelota										●	●	3	4	7
Bocce			●	2										2
Chess							●	10						10
Cue sports		●	2	2	4									8
Cycling	BMX freestyle					2								2
Cycling	Mountain biking						3					1		4
Dominoes				●	5									5
Esports											2	1	1	4
Futsal								●	●	●	1			1
Indoor rowing									3	2	3			8
Karate											●	6	2	8
Kickboxing										●	●	7		7
Muaythai				●	4	4								8
Powerlifting							12	12						24
Roller sports	Inline speed skating										4	4		8
Roller sports	Skateboarding							●	2					2
Rugby sevens		●	●	2										2
Softball								●	●	●	●	1		1
Taekwondo					3	3								6
Weightlifting		8	10	2										20
Wushu								●	6	9	6			21
Total events		8	12	12	16	10	15	22	11	11	16	23	13	169
Cumulative total		8	20	32	48	58	73	95	106	117	133	156	169	N/A
November/December		27 Fri	28 Sat	29 Sun	30 Mon	1 Tue	2 Wed	3 Thu	4 Fri	5 Sat	6 Sun	7 Mon	8 Tue	Medal Events

== Medal table ==
* Host nation (Peru)

Rank	NOC	Gold	Silver	Bronze	Total
1	Peru*	49	38	27	114
2	Colombia	44	35	16	95
3	Chile	30	23	19	72
4	Venezuela	16	30	30	76
5	Ecuador	9	11	31	51
6	Bolivia	4	6	19	29
7	Guatemala	3	11	18	32
8	Dominican Republic	2	2	7	11
9	El Salvador	2	2	4	8
10	Panama	0	1	6	7
Totals (10 entries)		159	159	177	495

Source: Bolivarianos Ayacucho 2024 – Medallería

== Medalists ==
=== 3X3 basketball ===
Event	Gold	Silver	Bronze
Men's tournament	Dominican Republic; Rayner Moquete; César Reyes; Brayan Almonte; Shamil Ballas	Venezuela; José Bracho; Wilklerman Gómez; Ernesto Hernández; José Rodríguez	Colombia; Rodrigo Peña; Yesid Mosquera; Anders Valencia; José Lozano
Women's tournament	Chile; Ziomara Morrison; Gabriela Ahumada; Javiera Novión; Fernanda Ovalle	Colombia; Jenifer Muñoz; Carolina López; Yuliany Maryelis	Ecuador; Dayanna Salcedo; Marjorie Caicedo; Ana Mora; Heidi Guayaquil

=== Aerobic gymnastics ===
Event	Gold	Silver	Bronze
Men's individual	William Flórez; Colombia	Elvis Espinosa; Venezuela	Victor Retamal; Chile
Women's individual	Thaís Fernández; Peru	Andrea León; Venezuela	Bianca Henríquez; Chile
Mixed duet	Chile; Paula Zúñiga; Giovanni Espinoza	Colombia; Angela Nieto; Daniel López	Venezuela; Lorena Yovera; Elvis Espinosa
Mixed trio	Peru; Thais Fernández; Josefina Canales; Paula Sanchezleón	Peru; Alessandra Petrozzi; Alessia Rodríguez; Paulina Larrea	Chile; Bianca Henríquez; Giovanni Espinoza; Paula Zúñiga
Mixed group	Peru; Alessia Rodríguez; Josefina Canales; Paulina Larrea; Sofía Rodríguez; Thais Fernández	Venezuela; Alondra González; Andrea León; Daniela Borrero; Dorangela Rueda; Luahna Charles	Peru; Alessandra Petrozzi; Fiorella Dauriol; Giana Benavides; Mara Lizarraga; Paula Sanchezleón
Mixed team	Chile	Venezuela	Colombia

=== Athletics ===
Event	Gold	Silver	Bronze
Men's cross country	Walter Nina; Peru	José Luis Rojas; Peru	Segundo Jami; Ecuador
Women's cross country	Jovana de la Cruz; Peru	Gladys Tejeda; Peru	Jhoselyn Camargo; Bolivia
Mixed relay half-marathon	Guatemala; Alberto González; Mario Pacay; Sandra Raxón; Viviana Aroche	Ecuador; Diego Arévalo; Fernando Moreno; Mary Granja; Rosa Chacha	Bolivia; David Mamani; Gabriela Mamani; Jhoselyn Camargo; Rubén Arando

=== Basque pelota ===
Event	Gold	Silver	Bronze
Men's individual fronton rubber ball	Cristopher Matínez; Peru	Renato Bolelli; Chile	Rodrigo Penedo; Guatemala
Women's individual fronton rubber ball	Valeria Garcés; Peru	Diana Rangel; Venezuela	Rosario Valderrama; Chile
Men's frontball	José Soliz; Bolivia	Jesús Quinto; Peru	Gonzalo Fouilloux; Chile
Women's frontball	Julieta Rangel; Venezuela	Pascal Ramírez; Chile	Cristina Nuñez; Peru
Men's doubles frontenis	Peru; Edson Velásquez; Franco Velasco	Chile; Jesús García; Renato Bolelli	Bolivia; Juan Moron; Luis Anturiano
Women's doubles frontenis	Peru; Jessenia Bernal; Valeria Garcés	Chile; Emilia Domínguez; Rosario Valderrama	Bolivia; Blanca Pérez; Rocío Rengifo
Mixed doubles frontenis	Peru; Cristopher Martínez; Mía Rodríguez	Chile; Renato Bolelli; Rosario Valderrama	El Salvador; Efraín Segura; Katya Aceituno

=== Bocce ===
Event	Gold	Silver	Bronze
Men's individual petanque	José Manuel Marcano; Venezuela	Renato Donoso; Chile	Erik Bardelli; Peru
Women's individual petanque	Rosalba Rojas; Peru	María de Jesús Pérez; Venezuela	Melisa Polito; Chile
Men's individual raffa	Franco Barbano; Chile	Sandro Saletti; Peru	Cristian Velásquez; Venezuela
Women's individual raffa	Sabrina Polito; Chile	Mariolina Saletti; Peru	Anabel Jimpenez; Venezuela
Mixed couples petanque	Venezuela; José Manuel Marcano; María de Jesús Pérez	Chile; Melisa Polito; Renato Donoso	Peru; Erik Bardelli; Rosalba Rojas
Mixed couples raffa	Peru; Mariolina Saletti; Sandro Saletti	Chile; Franco Barbano; Sabrina Polito	Venezuela; Anabel Jiménez; Cristian Velásquez
Mixed team petanque	Venezuela; José Manuel Marcano; María de Jesús Pérez	Chile; Melisa Polito; Renato Donoso	Peru; Erik Bardelli; Rosalba Rojas
Mixed team raffa	Chile; Franco Barbano; Sabrina Polito	Peru; Mariolina Saletti; Sandro Saletti	Venezuela; Anabel Jiménez; Cristian Velásquez

=== Chess ===
Event	Gold	Silver	Bronze
Men's individual blitz, board 1	Jorge Cori; Peru	Santiago Ávila; Colombia	Oswaldo Zambrana; Bolivia
Women's individual blitz, board 1	Deysi Cori; Peru	Valentina Argote; Colombia	Ashley Castillo; Panama
Men's individual blitz, board 2	Esteban Valderrama; Colombia	Renato Terry; Peru	Licael Ticona; Bolivia
Women's individual blitz, board 2	Vicmary Pérez; Venezuela	Ingrid Aliaga; Peru	Deycy Raymundo; Guatemala
Men's individual rapid, board 1	Jorge Cori; Peru	Santiago Ávila; Colombia	Félix Ynojosa; Venezuela
Women's individual rapid, board 1	Valentina Argote; Colombia	Deysi Cori; Peru	Ashley Castillo; Panama
Men's individual rapid, board 2	Esteban Valderrama; Colombia	Renato Terry; Peru	Carlos Juárez; Guatemala
Women's individual rapid, board 2	Ingris Rivera; Colombia	Deycy Raymundo; Guatemala	Vicmary Pérez; Venezuela
Mixed teams blitz	Peru; Deysi Cori; Ingrid Aliaga; Jorge Cori; Renato Terry	Colombia; Esteban Valderrama; Ingris Rivera; Santiago Ávila; Valentina Argote	Venezuela; Félix Ynojosa; Samid Escalna; Tairu Rovira; Vicmary Pérez
Mixed teams rapid	Colombia; Esteban Valderrama; Ingris Rivera; Santiago Ávila; Valentina Argote	Peru; Deysi Cori; Ingrid Aliaga; Jorge Cori; Renato Terry	Guatemala; Carlos Juárez; David Girón; Deycy Raymundo; Laura Jop

=== Cue sports ===
Event	Gold	Silver	Bronze
Men's individual nine-ball	Laineker Quiñonez; Colombia	Gerson Martínez; Peru	Anthony Rodríguez; Venezuela
Women's individual nine-ball	Johanna Espinoza; Venezuela	Astrid Santos; Guatemala	Katherine Corzo; Peru
Men's team nine-ball	Peru; Edgard Vallenas; Gerson Martínez	Venezuela; Anthony Rodríguez; Javier Martínez	Colombia; Jorge Arcos; Laineker Quiñonez
Mixed team nine-ball	Colombia; Andrea Cardona; Laineker Quiñonez	Guatemala; Astrid Santos; Everest López	Peru; Gerson Martínez; Jacqueline Álvarez
Men's individual three-cushion billiards	William Villanueva; Venezuela	José Luis Bleichner; Bolivia	Huberney Cataño; Colombia
Women's individual three-cushion billiards	Jessica Mendoza; Peru	Johana Sandoval; Colombia	Jackeline Pérez; Peru
Men's team three-cushion billiards	Colombia; Huberney Cataño; José García	Venezuela; Merlin Romero; William Villanueva	Peru; Jhosep Vega; Pedro Pachas
Mixed team three-cushion billiards	Colombia; Claudia Lalinde; José García	Colombia; Huberney Cataño; Johana Sandoval	Peru; Jessica Mendoza; Pedro Pachas

=== Cycling ===
Event	Gold	Silver	Bronze
Men's BMX freestyle	Luis Rincón; Colombia	José Manuel Cedano; Chile	Job Montañez; Peru
Women's BMX freestyle	Queen Saray Villegas; Colombia	Catalina Henríquez; Chile	Lizsurley Villegas; Colombia
Mixed cross-country relay	Colombia; Daniela Gaviria; Jhean Cardona; Juan José Benavides; María Isabel Castro	Chile; Antonia Rodríguez; Benjamín Inostroza; Florencia Monsalvez; Joaquín Muñoz	Ecuador; Alejandro Morocho; Dayanna Mendoza; Martín Arias; Prisila Rondal
Men's individual down-hill	Juan José Jaramillo; Colombia	Carlos Rodríguez; Ecuador	Martín Ramírez; Ecuador
Women's individual down-hill	Rafaela Roldán; Ecuador	Luz Aquino; Peru	Luciana Polanía; Colombia
SPORT	Ecuador; Carlos Rodríguez; Rafaela Roldán	Colombia; Juan José Jaramillo; Luciana Polanía	Peru; Franco Osores; Luz Aquino

=== Dominoes ===
Event	Gold	Silver	Bronze
Men's individual	Víctor Muñoz; Venezuela	Joaquín Martínez; Dominican Republic	Carlos Marquina; Venezuela
Women's individual	Jackeline Parisi; Venezuela	Lizanne Kelly; Aruba	Yosenid Santana; Puerto Rico
Men's doubles	Venezuela; Carlos Marquina; Víctor Muñoz	ODEBO Athletes; Isauro Carrizo; Manuel Carvajal	Puerto Rico; José Luis Mendez; Manuel Rosa
Women's doubles	Venezuela; Jackeline Parisi; Wendy Fernández	United States; Maggie Cruz; María Luisa Morales	Dominican Republic; Isabel Mejía; Ivonne Aracena
Mixed team	Aruba; Glenn Croes; Jadimir Kwidama; Lizanne Kelly; Magda Kock	Dominican Republic; Isabel Mejía; Ivonne Aracena; Joaquín Martínez; José Guzmán	Venezuela; Carlos Marquina; Jackeline Parisi; Víctor Muñoz; Wendy Fernpandez

=== Esport ===
Event	Gold	Silver	Bronze
Men's individual eFootball	Gelvert Estrada; Peru	Ángel García; Colombia	Japheth Catuy; Panama
Men's individual tekken	Édgar Pacheco; Bolivia	Alejandro de la Espriella; Colombia	Rafael Fusco; Venezuela
Men's team Dota 2	Peru; Brayan López; Edward Guillén; Jeanpierre Valente; Jordan Huaman; Moisés Asencios	Bolivia; Alen Kantuta; Freddy Villarroel; Joel Pacoricona; Juan Carlos Mamani; Ronald Romero	Colombia; Juan Robayo; Juan Quintero; Juan Sandoval; Leonardo Saenz; Nicolás Aldana
Women's team Dota 2	Peru; Abigail Cuenta; Fanny Chuquimamani; Judith Polo; Ruth Cahuana; Wendy Arias	Chile; Camila Herrera; Javiera Campos; Javiera González; Macarena Albornoz; Nicole Ceballos	Ecuador; Dayana Zhamungui; Michelle Saavedra; Pamela Zhamungui; Sofía Calvopiña; Thalia López

=== Futsal ===
Event	Gold	Silver	Bronze
Men's tournament	Guatemala; Alan Aguilar; Angel Mazariegos; Edgar Santizo; Fernando Campaignac; Jenner Paniagua; Jhonny Díaz; José Reyes; Marvin Sandoval; Nelson Tagre; Patrick Ruiz; Roberto Alvarado; Wanderley Ruiz	Panama; Abdiel Ortiz; Alexis Castillo; Alfonso Maquensi; Ángel Sánchez; Jaime Peñaloza; José Álvarez; José Caballero; José Escobar; Luis Vásquez; Mario Forero; Ricardo Castillo; Ruman Milord	Colombia; Andrés Matos; Angelo Santofimio; Brayan Vanegas; Cristian Neme; Jeison Padilla; Jorge Cuervo; José Guerrero; José Sánchez; Julián Pardo; Luis Posada; Ronald Solorzano; Sebastian Sanchez

=== Indoor rowing ===
Event	Gold	Silver	Bronze
Men's singles	Nahuel Reyes; Chile	Johann Hamann; Peru	Willian Lafferty; Bolivia
Women's singles	Antonia Pichott; Chile	Valenria Palacios; Peru	Nicolle González; Guatemala
Men's doubles	Chile; Andoni Habash; Brahim Alvayay	Peru; Johann Hamann; Vincenzo Giurfa	Colombia; Andrés Mejía; Johann Loewenstein
Women's doubles	Chile; Camila Cofré; Josefa Vila	Peru; Alessia Palacios; Valeria Palacios	Bolivia; Alejandra Martínez; Naydelin Carlo
Mixed doubles	Chile; Alfredo Abraham; Christina Hostetter	Peru; Alessia Palacios; Vincenzo Giurfa	Guatemala; José Carlos Escobar; Lesli González
Men's quadruple	Chile; Alfredo Abraham; Andoni Habash; Brahim Alvayay; Nahuel Reyes	Peru; Johann Hamann; Manuel Del Castillo; Manuel Lama; Renzo Ramírez	Bolivia; Daniel Mamani; Marco Catunta; Nelson Condori; Willian Lafferty
Women's quadruple	Chile; Antonia Pichott; Camila Cofré; Christina Hostetter; Josefa Vila	Peru; Adriana Sanguineti; Alessia Palacios; Pamela Noya; Valeria Palacios	Bolivia; Alejandra Martínez; Karen Mamani; Naydelin Carlo; Nayra Lafferty
Mixed quadruple	Chile; Alfredo Abraham; Antonia Pichott; Brahim Alvayay; Christina Hostetter	Peru; Adriana Sanguineti; Johann Hamann; Pamela Noya; Vincenzo Giurfa	Bolivia; Francesco Alonzo; Lesli González; Maynor López; Nicolle González

=== Karate ===
Event	Gold	Silver	Bronze
Men's -67kg	Alan Miquelena; Venezuela	Maximiliano Jara; Chile	Pedropablo De La Roca; Guatemala
Men's -67kg	Alan Miquelena; Venezuela	Maximiliano Jara; Chile	Fred Proaño; Ecuador
Women's -55kg	Bárbara Pérez; Venezuela	Geraldine Peña; Colombia	Gabriella Izaguirre; El Salvador
Women's -55kg	Bárbara Pérez; Venezuela	Geraldine Peña; Colombia	Lili Alvarado; Ecuador
Men's -75kg	Juan Landázuri; Colombia	Daniel Manriquez; Chile	Gunther Salaya; Venezuela
Men's -75kg	Juan Landázuri; Colombia	Daniel Manriquez; Chile	Washington Luna; Ecuador
Women's -61kg	Jacqueline Factos; Ecuador	Valentina Vega; Chile	Karla Cruces; Venezuela
Women's -61kg	Jacqueline Factos; Ecuador	Valentina Vega; Chile	Ámbar García; Dominican Republic
Men's +75kg	Brandon Ramírez; Guatemala	Rubén Henao; Colombia	Gabriel Torrealba; Venezuela
Men's +75kg	Brandon Ramírez; Guatemala	Rubén Henao; Colombia	José Acevedo; Ecuador
Women's +61kg	Amy López; Ecuador	Sol Cabrera; Peru	Oriana Rodríguez; Venezuela
Women's +61kg	Amy López; Ecuador	Sol Cabrera; Peru	Renata Nieto; Bolivia
Men's individual kata	Cleiver Casanova; Venezuela	Mariano Wong; Peru	Fernando Calderón; Guatemala
Men's individual kata	Cleiver Casanova; Venezuela	Mariano Wong; Peru	Heriberto De Castro; Dominican Republic
Women's individual kata	Valentina Zapata; Colombia	Rosa Almarza; Peru	Daniela García; Venezuela
Women's individual kata	Valentina Zapata; Colombia	Rosa Almarza; Peru	Cristina Orbe; Ecuador

=== Kickboxing ===
Event	Gold	Silver	Bronze
Men's -54kg	Kenny Bellido; Peru	José Dorante; Venezuela	Cristián Chávez; Guatemala
Women's -48kg	Flor Vilcamichi; Peru	Onexire Mendoza; Venezuela	María José Morán; Guatemala
Men's -57kg	Edwin Fernández; Peru	César Rodas; Guatemala	Gustavo Avendaño; Venezuela
Men's -57kg	Edwin Fernández; Peru	César Rodas; Guatemala	Luis Soriano; Dominican Republic
Women's -52kg	Yasmín Henríquez; El Salvador	Darienly Contreras; Dominican Republic	Isabel Morales; Guatemala
Women's -52kg	Yasmín Henríquez; El Salvador	Darienly Contreras; Dominican Republic	Brenda Romero; Venezuela
Men's -63.5kg	Andrés Trecanao; Chile	Fabio Alvarado; Guatemala	Josias Pérez; Peru
Men's -63.5kg	Andrés Trecanao; Chile	Fabio Alvarado; Guatemala	Miguel Athansiades; Panama
Women's -56kg	Mavet Yupanqui; Peru	Krissia Delgado; El Salvador	Váleri Castañeda; Guatemala
Women's -56kg	Mavet Yupanqui; Peru	Krissia Delgado; El Salvador	Macarena Orellana; Chile
Men's -71kg	Joel Vásquez; Venezuela	Andrés García; Guatemala	Henry Siquihua; Peru
Men's -71kg	Joel Vásquez; Venezuela	Andrés García; Guatemala	Santiago Soriano; Dominican Republic
Women's -60kg	Ana Medina; Peru	Camila Basaez; Chile	Waleska Panizzo; Venezuela
Women's -60kg	Ana Medina; Peru	Camila Basaez; Chile	Lansis Jose; Dominican Republic

=== Muaythai ===
Event	Gold	Silver	Bronze
Men's -57kg	Eduardo Alarcón; Peru	Rodrigo Suárez; Colombia	Ronaldo Panozo; Bolivia
Women's -48kg	Suci Zerpa; Peru	Brigitt Gómez; Bolivia	—N/a
Men's -67kg	Luis Olivares; Peru	John Susunaga; Colombia	Aron Chambi; Bolivia
Women's -54kg	María Nataly Vargas; Bolivia	María Angélica Buitrón; Peru	—N/a
Men's -71kg	Joaquín Fernández; Peru	Yakill Rojas; Bolivia	—N/a
Women's -60kg	María Teresa Gutiérrez; Peru	Karen Flores; Bolivia	—N/a
Men's -81kg	Matteo Celi; Peru	Gabriel Pérez; Bolivia	Esteban Martínez; Colombia
Women's Wai Kru	María Nataly Vargas; Bolivia	Gianina Paucca; Peru	—N/a

=== Powerlifting ===
Event	Gold	Silver	Bronze
Men's lightweight 59kg - 66kg	Luis Ferrari; Peru	Franklin León; Ecuador	José Tomás Merino; Chile
Women's lightweight 47kg - 52kg	Keissy García; Colombia	Carmen Fernández; Peru	Carmen Bueno; Ecuador
Men's lightweight deadlift 59kg - 66kg	Luis Ferrari; Peru	Luis Lima; Guatemala	José Tomás Merino; Chile
Women's lightweight deadlift 47kg - 52kg	Carmen Fernández; Peru	Keissy García; Colombia	Carmen Bueno; Ecuador
Men's lightweight bench press 59kg - 66kg	José Tomás Merino; Chile	Luis Ferrari; Peru	Franklin León; Ecuador
Women's lightweight bench press 47kg - 52kg	Carmen Bueno; Ecuador	Carmen Fernández; Peru	Keissy García; Colombia
Men's lightweight squat 59kg - 66kg	Franklin León; Ecuador	José Tomás Merino; Chile	Luis Ferrari; Peru
Women's lightweight squat 47kg - 52kg	Keissy García; Colombia	Carmen Fernández; Peru	Diana Recinos; Guatemala
Men's middleweight 74kg - 83kg	Pablo Anderson; Chile	Cristián Trigo; Peru	Samir Chatas; Colombia
Women's middleweight 57kg - 63kg	Kenia Monserrate; Ecuador	María Alejandra Domínguez; Venezuela	Javiera Contador; Chile
Men's middleweight deadlift 74kg - 83kg	Pablo Anderson; Chile	Samir Chatas; Colombia	Cristián Trigo; Peru
Women's middleweight deadlift 57kg - 63kg	Javiera Contador; Chile	Laura Varela; Colombia	María Alejandra Domínguez; Venezuela
Men's middleweight bench press 74kg - 83kg	Pablo Anderson; Chile	Jorge Us; Guatemala	Cristián Trigo; Peru
Women's middleweight bench press 57kg - 63kg	María Alejandra Domínguez; Venezuela	Kenia Monserrate; Ecuador	Javiera Contador; Chile
Men's middleweight squat 74kg - 83kg	Cristián Trigo; Peru	Pablo Anderson; Chile	Samir Chatas; Colombia
Women's middleweight squat 57kg - 63kg	Kenia Monserrate; Ecuador	Daniela Anton; Peru	María Alejandra Domínguez; Venezuela
Men's heavyweight 93kg - 105kg	Moisés Villón; Ecuador	Edgar Orozco; Colombia	Bernardo Ibañez; Chile
Women's heavyweight 69kg - 76kg	Candy Salinas; Peru	Antonia Madrid; Chile	Yessika Carmona; Colombia
Men's heavyweight deadlift 93kg - 105kg	Edgar Orozco; Colombia	Jaime Ortiz; Peru	Edgar Pérez; Venezuela
Women's heavyweight deadlift 69kg - 76kg	Antonia Madrid; Chile	Yessika Carmona; Colombia	Candy Salinas; Peru
Men's heavyweight bench press 93kg - 105kg	Moisés Villón; Ecuador	Edgar Orozco; Colombia	Bernardo Ibañez; Chile
Women's heavyweight bench press 69kg - 76kg	Candy Salinas; Peru	Antonia Madrid; Chile	Joshanny López; Venezuela
Men's heavyweight squat 93kg - 105kg	Bernardo Ibañez; Chile	Moisés Villón; Ecuador	Edgar Pérez; Venezuela
Women's heavyweight squat 69kg - 76kg	Candy Salinas; Peru	Yessika Carmona; Colombia	Antonia Madrid; Chile
Men's super heavyweight 120kg - +120kg	Felipe Romero; Chile	José Luis Viloria; Colombia	Ricardo Coloma; Ecuador
Women's super heavyweight 84kg - +84kg	Paula Castro; Chile	Joselyn García; Ecuador	Oscaris Salazar; Venezuela
Men's super heavyweight deadlift 120kg - +120kg	Felipe Romero; Chile	José Luis Viloria; Colombia	Ricardo Coloma; Ecuador
Women's super heavyweight deadlift 84kg - +84kg	Paula Castro; Chile	Oscaris Salazar; Venezuela	Joselyn García; Ecuador
Men's super heavyweight bench press 120kg - +120kg	José Luis Viloria; Colombia	Ricardo Coloma; Ecuador	Felipe Romero; Chile
Women's super heavyweight bench press 84kg - +84kg	Paula Castro; Chile	Jocelyn Hernández; Peru	Joselyn García; Ecuador
Men's super heavyweight squat 120kg - +120kg	José Luis Viloria; Colombia	Felipe Romero; Chile	Edwin Velásquez; Guatemala
Women's super heavyweight squat 84kg - +84kg	Jocelyn Hernández; Peru	Joselyn García; Ecuador	Wendy Godínez; Guatemala

=== Roller sports ===
Event	Gold	Silver	Bronze
Men's 1,000 metres sprint	Juan Mantilla; Colombia	José Carlos Rojas; Venezuela	Nicolás García; Ecuador
Women's 1,000 metres sprint	Gabriela Rueda; Colombia	Kollin Castro; Colombia	Fernanda Moncada; Ecuador
Men's 1,000 metres elimination	Juan Mantilla; Colombia	Nicolás García; Ecuador	Fabián Díaz; Chile
Women's 1,000 metres elimination	Gabriela Rueda; Colombia	Angy Quintero; Venezuela	Fernanda Moncada; Ecuador
Men's 200m dual time trial	Jhon Tascón; Colombia	Faberson Bonilla; Guatemala	Cristián Sandoval; Chile
Women's 200m dual time trial	Ivonne Nóchez; El Salvador	Kollin Castro; Colombia	Helen Rivera; Guatemala
Men's 500 metres + distance sprint	Jhon Tascón; Colombia	Juan Mantilla; Colombia	Jeremy Ulcuango; Ecuador
Women's 500 metres + distance sprint	Kollin Castro; Colombia	Ivonne Nóchez; El Salvador	Helen Rivera; Guatemala

=== Rugby sevens ===
Event	Gold	Silver	Bronze
Men's tournament	Chile; Agustín Game; Agustín Morande; Álvaro Castro; Antonio Corbella; Dimitri Simonidis; Federico Kennedy; Juan Ignacio Piña; Julián Troncoso; Manuel Bustamante; Nicolás Greiber; Rodrigo Araya; Sebastián Bianchi	Colombia; Alejandro Guisao; Andrés Mosquera; Cristian Rodallegas; Daniel Villa; Daniel Gómez; Davinson Rosero; Jader Quiñones; Jhojan Ortiz; Juan Camilo Romero; Juan David Agudelo; Marlon Oquendo; Neider García	Peru; Alonzo Vilchez; Andy Soto; Humberto Zanabria; Joaquín Trelles; Jonathan Valdivia; José María Anicama; José María Ramírez; Luis Monier; Miguel Ortega; Oscar Rivera; Renato Lecca; Renzo Flores
Women's tournament	Colombia; Carol Carmona; Daniela Alzate; Eva Pino; Jocelin Agredo; Juliana Soto; Karen Jiménez; Laura Pacheco; Leidy Soto; Madi Córdoba; Nikol Durango; Valentina Tapias; Zuleima Orobio	Chile; Antonia Campbell; Antonieta Badilla; Beatriz Araneda; Catalina Miranda; Catalina Villarroel; Daniela Rojas; Javiera Fuentes; Juaquina Herrera; María Teresa Marín; Nataly Badilla; Valeria Vera; Zilera Wyss	Peru; Beatriz Orcotoma; Camila García; Gabriela Julve; Josselyn Caja; Karoline Vergara; Lisbeth Ccarampa; Lucyangeles Flores; María Flavia Connearn; María Samantha Chuquivala; Nadya Matamoros; Nayely Sánchez; Stephany Márquez

=== Softball ===
Event	Gold	Silver	Bronze
Women's tournament	Venezuela; Bailey Olerich; Dayerlin Rivas; Diana Arcay; Eila Infante; Freymar Suniaga; Jairimar Pulido; Kisbel Vizcaya; Loreley Francia; Mary Torres; Michelle Floyd; Verónica Antequera; Yakary Molina; Yulexis Barrios; Yuruby Alicart; Yusneiby Acacio	Colombia; Angelly Benítez; Audrey Lum; Danisha Livingston; Francela Verdura; Katherine Rodríguez; Kelly Torres; Kerlyn Guzmán; Leny Hoyos; Libis Hurtado; María Avendaño; Natalia Álvarez; Solibeth Núñez; Sophia Bertorelli; Sugey Solano; Yina Ballesta	Dominican Republic; Anabel Ulloa; Anyela Gómez; Brianna Estevez; Claudia Santana; Eduarda Rocha; Emmy Segura; Felicia Agramonte; Jayla Santana; Katherine Sugilio; Marianny Caso; Massiel Heredia; Melody Vizcaino; Yanela Gómez; Yasmel Vargas; Yissel Sánchez

=== Taekwondo ===
Event	Gold	Silver	Bronze
Men's individual freestyle	Mateo Argomedo; Peru	Michael Montaña; Colombia	Elías Ruiz; El Salvador
Men's individual freestyle	Mateo Argomedo; Peru	Michael Montaña; Colombia	Víctor Cortéz; Ecuador
Women's individual freestyle	Nicole Beltrán; Colombia	Karla Martínez; Peru	Belén Villagra; Chile
Women's individual freestyle	Nicole Beltrán; Colombia	Karla Martínez; Peru	Daniela García; Ecuador
Men's individual traditional	Sebastián Guzmán; Peru	Fernando Salgado; Ecuador	Elías Ruiz; El Salvador
Men's individual traditional	Sebastián Guzmán; Peru	Fernando Salgado; Ecuador	Isaac Velez; Colombia
Women's individual traditional	Carmela De la Barra; Peru	Daniela Quirama; Colombia	Paula Poveda; Ecuador
Women's individual traditional	Carmela De la Barra; Peru	Daniela Quirama; Colombia	Daniela Rodríguez; Panama
Men's freestyle team	Peru; José Carrasco; Mateo Argomedo; Sebastián Guzmán	Ecuador; Christián Sangoquiza; Fernando Salgado; Víctor Cortéz	Venezuela; Alvy Piña; Bryan González; Georfren Reyes
Men's freestyle team	Peru; José Carrasco; Mateo Argomedo; Sebastián Guzmán	Ecuador; Christián Sangoquiza; Fernando Salgado; Víctor Cortéz	Colombia; Isaac Velez; Juan Bustamante; Michael Montaña
Women's freestyle team	Peru; Alexandra Pimentel; Carmela De la Barra; Karla Martínez	Ecuador; Daniela García; Lissette Segura; Paula Poveda	Colombia; Daniela Quirama; Laura Olarte; Nicole Beltrán
Women's freestyle team	Peru; Alexandra Pimentel; Carmela De la Barra; Karla Martínez	Ecuador; Daniela García; Lissette Segura; Paula Poveda	Venezuela; Fernanda Melillo; Nohemi Córdova; Oquisys Rodríguez

=== Weightlifting ===
Event	Gold	Silver	Bronze
Men's -55kg	Duvan Ferrer; Colombia	Angello Solorzano; Venezuela	Juan Miguel Martínez; Panama
Women's -45kg	Mariangeli Martínez; Venezuela	Nora Gómez; Colombia	Faviana Gavidia; Peru
Men's -61kg	Jhon Serna; Colombia	Henry Esquivel; Guatemala	Dionangel Vargas; Venezuela
Women's -49kg	Karol López; Colombia	Kerlys Montilla; Venezuela	Yessica Torrez; Bolivia
Men's -67kg	Sebastián Olivares; Colombia	Luis Bardalez; Peru	José Alexander Mendez; El Salvador
Women's -55kg	Gelen Torres; Colombia	Rosselyn Uzcategui; Venezuela	Shoely Mego; Peru
Men's -73kg	Andrés Manzano; Colombia	Reinner Arango; Venezuela	Sergio Cares; Chile
Women's -59kg	Jenifer Becerra; Ecuador	Rosalba Morales; Colombia	Anyelin Venegas; Venezuela
Men's -81kg	Hugo Montes; Colombia	Ángel Rodríguez; Venezuela	Germán Palacios; Ecuador
Women's -64kg	Yenny Sinisterra; Colombia	Claudia Rengifo; Venezuela	Jessica Palacios; Ecuador
Men's -89kg	Jokser Albornoz; Colombia	Nerwis Maneiro; Venezuela	Neiser Grefa; Ecuador
Women's -71kg	María Mena; Colombia	Damary Nazareno; Ecuador	Keilly Silva; Venezuela
Men's -96kg	Juan Solís; Colombia	Amel Atencia; Peru	Luis Díaz; Ecuador
Women's -76kg	Darly Sánchez; Colombia	Lidysmar Aparicio; Venezuela	Denie Díaz; Peru
Men's -102kg	Jhohan Sanguino; Venezuela	Marcos Bonilla; Colombia	Alfredo Tripul; Peru
Women's -81kg	Erika Sinisterra; Colombia	Everyk Valero; Venezuela	Beverly de León; Guatemala
Men's -109kg	Hernán Viera; Peru	Yeison López Cuello; Colombia	—N/a
Women's -87kg	Sirley Montano; Colombia	Dayana Chirinos; Venezuela	Dayana Mina; Ecuador
Men's +109kg	Santiago Cossio; Colombia	Alonso Bizama; Chile	Dixon Arroyo; Ecuador
Women's +87kg	Arantzazu Pavez; Chile	Yairan Tysforod; Colombia	Zoreannys Henríquez; Venezuela

=== Wushu ===
Event	Gold	Silver	Bronze
Men's -56kg sanda	Guillermo Taveras; Dominican Republic	Héctor Reyes; Venezuela	David Osorio; Peru
Men's -56kg sanda	Guillermo Taveras; Dominican Republic	Héctor Reyes; Venezuela	César Fernández; Bolivia
Women's -56kg sanda	Athalia Aranda; Peru	Yanna Araque; Venezuela	—N/a
Men's -60kg sanda	Williams Tablante; Venezuela	Orlando Rosero; Ecuador	Henry Fernández; Peru
Men's -60kg sanda	Williams Tablante; Venezuela	Orlando Rosero; Ecuador	Jeyson Vizcaino; Dominican Republic
Women's -60kg sanda	Yosmairy Lara; Venezuela	Shirley Llontop; Peru	Emily Veliz; Ecuador
Men's -65kg sanda	José Andrés Wissman; Peru	Carlos Custodio; Dominican Republic	Jerónimo Poveda; Colombia
Men's -65kg sanda	José Andrés Wissman; Peru	Carlos Custodio; Dominican Republic	Jhon Sornoza; Ecuador
Men's -70kg sanda	Edson Rodríguez; Peru	Zaciro Alcala; Venezuela	Diego Arriagada; Chile
Men's -70kg sanda	Edson Rodríguez; Peru	Zaciro Alcala; Venezuela	Brian Villca; Bolivia
Men's taolu chan quan	Moisés Bobadilla; Chile	José Escalona; Venezuela	Jorge Copara; Peru
Women's taolu chan quan	Cinthia Huaylla; Peru	Joana Castelar; Venezuela	Dania Reyes; Chile
Men's taolu daoshu	Jorge Copara; Peru	Juan Sandoval; Chile	José Escalona; Venezuela
Men's taolu gunshu	Héctor Toledo; Chile	Jorge Copara; Peru	José Escalona; Venezuela
Women's taolu gunshu	Joana Castelar; Venezuela	Dania Reyes; Chile	—N/a
Men's taolu jiashu	Fabián Reyes; Chile	—N/a	—N/a
Women's taolu jiashu	Cinthia Huaylla; Peru	Joana Castelar; Venezuela	—N/a
Men's taolu nan quan	Luis Bernal; Chile	Kleber Pacha; Ecuador	—N/a
Women's taolu nan quan	Tamara Gallardo; Chile	Johana Montaña; Venezuela	Karla Miranda; Bolivia
Men's taolu nandao	Luis Bernal; Chile	—N/a	—N/a
Women's taolu nandao	Tamara Gallardo; Chile	Johanna Montaña; Venezuela	Karla Miranda; Bolivia
Men's taolu nangun	Luis Bernal; Chile	Kleber Pacha; Ecuador	—N/a
Women's taolu nandao	Johana Montaña; Venezuela	—N/a	—N/a
Men's taolu qiangshu	Moisés Bobadilla; Chile	—N/a	—N/a
Women's taolu qiangshu	Cinthia Huaylla; Peru	—N/a	—N/a

== Marketing ==
=== Logo ===
The logo for the 2024 Bolivarian Games consists of an isotype representing the obelisk of the Pampa de Ayacucho, the scene of the Battle of Ayacucho that consolidated the independence of the American continent, and the three-line coast isotype:

- Blue: It identifies the sky of the Andes, as well as the force of the rivers that never stop and that forcefully propel the path to victory.
- Red: It represents the blood shed by the heroes of history who fought for independence, as well as passion, faith and devotion.
- Green and Yellow: The green line represents high Andean agriculture, youth, and the determination of the athletes. The yellow line perpetuates the cultural heritage, representing the joy of the dances and the energy of those who participate.
  Under the Andean worldview, it shows the coexistence of the Andean trilogy represented in three worlds that give order to the cosmos, in the sacred relationship of man with the earth:
- The first represents Hanan Pacha, the future, the sky, and the connection with the Andean gods.
- The second refers to Kay Pacha, the present, the world we live in, represented by the red color that symbolizes the blood that runs through the veins of every living being.
- The third represents Uku Pacha, the past, the world within the bowels of the earth, and the green of nature that submerges it.

=== Official phrases ===
The Games' bid slogan was Bolivarian Games For All – Ayacucho 2024 (Spanish: Juegos Bolivarianos Para Todos – Ayacucho 2024). During the games, the event's official double motto are "Ayacucho somos todos" ("Ayacucho is all of us") and "Sigamos haciendo historia" ("Let's keep making history").

=== Theme song ===
On November 6th, the official song "Wichaypaq", meaning "Upward, Always Together," was released. It was created by Ruby Palomino and Guido Ramírez. It was performed by Dilio Galindo, vocalist of the group Antología; Raúl Gómez and Freddie Gómez, members of Dúo Ayacucho; Gianfranco Bustíos; and Fredy Ortiz, vocalist of Uchpa. The musical production was led by Jesús "El Viejo" Rodríguez, and "Kayfex" contributed to the musical arrangement.

=== Mascot ===
In November 2023, after receiving more than 300 proposals, the organizing committee announced the three finalists of the mascot design contest. The final designs were: Danzaq, a character representing a scissor dancer; Señor Wari, inspired by the ancient civilization of the same name, which spread throughout much of the Peruvian Andes; and Wayra, a young athlete whose attire is inspired by the scissor dance. After six days of online voting, on November 29, during an event held at Mariscal Cáceres School, Danzaq was declared the winning design, receiving a total of 1,534 votes.

=== Bolivarian Bicentennial Clock ===
A clock has been installed in Ayacucho's main square, counting down to the start of the event as the Bolivarian Games' 20th Anniversary. The clock was turned on 246 days before the event, with the presence of Carlos Zegarra, executive director of the Special Legacy Project; Juan Carlos Arango, mayor of Huamanga; and several athletes.

The clock resembles the Pampa de Ayacucho obelisk with a three-section structure. It stands 4 meters tall, and the base is made of steel sheets, vinyl, and blackened glass. It features counters that count down the days, hours, minutes, and seconds.

=== Bolivarian Torch ===
The torch route began on November 22, 2024 under the motto "El Camino que Nos Une" ("The Path that Unites Us"), traveling through the eleven provinces of the department of Ayacucho starting with Pausa (Páucar del Sara Sara) and Cora Cora (Parinacochas), then Puquio (Lucanas) and Querobamba (Sucre) for November 23, Huancapi (Víctor Fajardo) and Sancos (Huanca Sancos) on November 24, on the 25th it will be in Cangallo (Cangallo) and Vilcashuamán (Vilcashuamán), San Miguel (La Mar) and Huanta (Huanta) on November 26, and in Huamanga it ended on Wednesday 27th.

== See also ==
- Asian Indoor and Martial Arts Games
