= Nilda (given name) =

Nilda is a Hispanic feminine given name. People with the name include:

- Nilda (born 1972), Brazilian football midfielder
- Nilda Callañaupa Alvarez (born 1960), indigenous Quechua weaver of Peru
- Nilda Fernández (1957–2019), French singer of Spanish descent
- Nilda Garré (born 1945), Argentine lawyer, politician, and diplomat
- Nilda Maria, Cape Verdean politician and social advocate
- Nilda Moyano (born 1976), Argentine politician
- Nilda Pedrosa (1974–2021), American politician
- Nilda (Nena) Peragallo, American university dean and professor
- Nilda Pinto (1918–1954), Curaçaoan writer of children's books
- Nilda Urquiza, Argentine guitarist and journalist

== See also ==
- Chau Chau Kang Nilda, mountain in the western Himalayas
