= Chess at the 2026 Central American and Caribbean Games =

- Venue: Centro Olímpico Juan Pablo Duarte
- Location: Santo Domingo, Dominican Republic
- Dates: 25–28 July

The chess competition at the 2026 Central American and Caribbean Games was held in Santo Domingo, Dominican Republic, from 25 to 28 July 2026 at the Centro Olímpico Juan Pablo Duarte.

== Participating nations ==
A total of 17 nations qualified athletes. The number of athletes a nation entered is in parentheses beside the name of the country.

- Barbados (4)
- Colombia (4)
- Costa Rica (4)
- Cuba (4)
- Dominican Republic (4)
- El Salvador (4)
- Guatemala (4)
- Guyana (2)
- Haiti (4)
- Honduras (2)
- Jamaica (4)
- Mexico (4)
- Nicaragua (4)
- Panama (4)
- Puerto Rico (4)
- Trinidad and Tobago (4)
- Venezuela (4)

== Medal table ==
* Host nation (Dominican Republic)

Rank	Nation	Gold	Silver	Bronze	Total
1	Colombia (COL)	3	2	1	6
2	Venezuela (VEN)	2	1	2	5
3	Cuba (CUB)	1	4	2	7
4	Panama (PAN)	1	1	0	2
5	Dominican Republic (DOM)*	1	0	0	1
6	Mexico (MEX)	0	0	2	2
7	El Salvador (ESA)	0	0	1	1
Totals (7 entries)		8	8	8	24

== Medal summary ==
=== Men's events ===
Event	Gold	Silver	Bronze
First Rapid Board	Esteban Valderrama; Colombia	Dylan Berdayes; Cuba	Félix Ynojosa; Venezuela
Second Rapid Board	Josué Araujo; Dominican Republic	Andrés Garzón; Colombia	Daniel Hidalgo; Cuba
First Blitz Board	Andrés Garzón; Colombia	Samid Escalona; Venezuela	Jorge Girón; El Salvador
Second Blitz Board	Félix Ynojosa; Venezuela	Daniel Hidalgo; Cuba	Gilberto Hernández Guerrero; Mexico

=== Women's events ===
Event	Gold	Silver	Bronze
First Rapid Board	Vicmary Pérez; Venezuela	Ashley Castillo; Panama	Ineymig Hernández Gil; Cuba
Second Rapid Board	Valentina Argote; Colombia	Roxangel Obregón; Cuba	Guadalupe Montaño; Mexico
First Blitz Board	Ashley Castillo; Panama	Ineymig Hernández Gil; Cuba	Valentina Argote; Colombia
Second Blitz Board	Roxangel Obregón; Cuba	Nicolle Mogollón; Colombia	Vicmary Pérez; Venezuela
