= Peruvian Chess Championship =

== Men's winners ==
Year	Winner
1942	José Andrés Pérez
1943	José Andrés Pérez
1947	Felipe Pinzón Sánchez
1949	Julio Súmar Casis
1950	Felipe Pinzón Sánchez
1951	Felipe Pinzón Sánchez
1952	Felipe Pinzón Sánchez
1953	José Andrés Pérez
1955	José Andrés Pérez
1957	Néstor Del Pozo
1960	Mario La Torre
1961	Oscar Quiñones
1962	Carlos Espinoza Rivasplata
1963	Oscar Quiñones
1964	Oscar Quiñones
1966	Oscar Quiñones
1967	Julio Súmar Casis
1968	Orestes Rodríguez Vargas
1969	Orestes Rodríguez Vargas
1970	Orestes Rodríguez Vargas
1971	Orestes Rodríguez Vargas
1972	Orestes Rodríguez Vargas
1973	Guillermo Ruiz
1974	Carlos Pesantes Carbajal
1975	Héctor Bravo Sedamanos
1976	Héctor Bravo Sedamanos
1978	Manuel Gonzales Bernal
1979	Carlo Robbiano Piura
1980	Pedro García Toledo
1981	Víctor Vílchez Talavera
1982	Jorge Peláez Conti
1984	Manuel Gonzales Bernal
1985	Juan Reyes Larenas
1986	Javier García Toledo
1987	Henry Urday Cáceres
1988	Jorge Pacheco Asmat
1989	Marcos Osorio
1990	Carlo Robbiano Piura
1993	Jorge Pacheco Asmat
1994	Julio Granda Zúñiga
1995	Julio Granda Zúñiga
1996	Julio Granda Zúñiga
1997	Julio Granda Zúñiga
1998	Mario Belli Pino
1999	Henry Urday Cáceres
2000	Filemón Cruz Lima
2001	Carlomagno Oblitas Guerrero
2002	Julio Granda Zúñiga
2003	Carlomagno Oblitas Guerrero
2004	Carlomagno Oblitas Guerrero
2005	Emilio Córdova
2006	Jorge Cori
2007	Ernesto Ramos
2008	Renato Terry
2009	Efrain Palacios
2010	Efrain Palacios
2011	Efrain Palacios
2012	Giuseppe Leiva
2013	Elfer Cutipa
2015	Renato Terry
2016	Fernando Fernández Sánchez
2017	Gianmarco Leiva
2022	Jorge Cori
2026	Jorge Cori

== Women's winners ==
Year	Winner
1997	Silvana Pacheco Gallardo
2000	Karen Zapata
2002	Karen Zapata
2003	Karen Zapata
2004	Karen Zapata
2007	Ingrid Aliaga
2008	Ann Chumpitaz
2009	Ingrid Aliaga
2010	Ann Chumpitaz
2011	Ingrid Aliaga
2012	Ingrid Aliaga
2013	Nicole Valdivia Cano
2015	Mitzy Caballero
2016	Ingrid Aliaga
2017	Ingrid Aliaga
2022	Mitzy Mishell Caballero Quijano
2026	Deysi Cori
