= Quiñónez =

Surname

Quiñones or Quiñónez is a Spanish surname. It is a toponym taken from places in the provinces of Murcia and León. The name is derived from the word quiñón, denoting a piece of land shared amongst five tenants. Notable people with the surname include:

- Álex Quiñónez (1989–2021), Ecuadorian sprinter
- Alfonso Quiñónez Molina (1874–1950), Salvadoran politician, physician, and president (1913–1914, 1918–1919, 1923–1927)
- Alfredo Quiñones-Hinojosa, neurosurgeon
- Anairis Quiñones (born 1997), American voice actress
- Blanca Quiñónez (born 2006), Ecuadorian basketball player
- Carlos Andrés Quiñónez (born 1980), Ecuadorian footballer
- Carlos Quiñónez (born 1977), Guatemalan football midfielder
- Crispiniano Quiñones Quiñones (died 2000), Colombian Army General
- Denise Quiñones (born 1980), the fourth Puerto Rican winner of the Miss Universe contest
- Dennise Longo Quiñones, Puerto Rican lawyer and government official
- Domingo Quiñones, singer of salsa music
- Eleuterio Quiñones, recurring fictional character in Puerto Rican radio and television
- Eloise Quiñones Keber, Professor of Art History at Baruch College and the CUNY Graduate Center
- Ernesto Quiñónez American writer and journalist
- Francisco de Quiñones (1482–1540), Spanish cardinal
- Francisco de Quiñónez, Spanish soldier who was appointed as governor of Chile (May 1599 – June 1600)
- Francisco Mariano Quiñones (1830–1908), proponent of the abolition of slavery and self-determination for Puerto Rico
- Hólger Quiñónez (born 1962), retired soccer defender from Ecuador
- Isalys Quiñones (born 1997), Puerto Rican basketball player
- Jackson Quiñónez (born 1980), Spanish hurdler of Afro-Ecuadorian descent
- John Quiñones, ABC News correspondent
- John Quiñones (politician) (born 1965), the first Republican of Puerto Rican ancestry elected to the Florida House of Representatives
- José Luis Quiñónez (born 1984), Ecuadorian footballer
- José María Gil-Robles y Quiñones (1898–1980), Spanish politician in the period leading up to the Spanish Civil War
- José Quiñones Gonzales (1914–1941), Peruvian military aviator and national aviation hero
- José Severo Quiñones, the first Chief Justice of the Supreme Court of Puerto Rico
- Juan Gómez-Quiñones (1940–2020), American historian, professor of history, poet, and activist
- Juan Quiñónez (born 1987), Peruvian footballer
- Julian Quiñones Quiñones (born 1997), Colombian-born Mexican footballer
- Lee Quiñones (born 1960), American graffiti artist
- Lester Quiñones (born 2000), Dominican-American basketball player
- Lorena Quiñones (born 1996), Puerto Rican artistic gymnast
- Luciano Quiñones (born 1948), pianist and composer of Modern Puerto Rican Danzas
- Luis Quiñones (born 1962), former utility infielder in Major League Baseball
- Marc Quiñones, American percussionist, a player in salsa music, and a member of The Allman Brothers Band
- Marcelo Quiñones (born 1949), former boxer from Peru
- Maria Quiñones-Sánchez (born 1968), politician in Philadelphia
- Michael Quiñónez (born 1984), Ecuadorian football attacking midfielder
- Oscar Quiñones (1941–2026), Peruvian chess master
- Óscar Quiñones (1919–1987), Peruvian artist
- Pedro Quiñónez (born 1986), Ecuadorian footballer
- Rafael Quiñones Vidal (1892–1988), journalist; radio and TV Master of Ceremonies
- Ray Quiñones (born 1958), retired Puerto Rican long jumper
- Rey Quiñones (born 1963), Puerto Rican baseball infielder
- Sam Quiñones (born 1958), American journalist
- Samuel R. Quiñones (1903–1976), the fifth President of the Senate of Puerto Rico, from 1949 to 1968
- Suero de Quiñones (1409–1458), Leonese knight and author
- Víctor Quiñones (1959–2006), Puerto Rican professional wrestling promoter and manager

== See also ==
- BAP Quiñones, several ships of the Peruvian navy
- FAP Captain José Abelardo Quiñones González International Airport (IATA: CIX, ICAO: SPHI) is an airport serving Chiclayo, Peru and the surrounding metropolitan area
