= Oscar Quiñones =

Oscar Quiñones may refer to:

- Óscar Quiñones (chess player) (1941–2026), Peruvian International Master
- Óscar Quiñones (artist) (1919–1987), Peruvian artist

== See also ==
- Óscar Quiñónez (born 2001), Ecuadorian footballer
