= Zoltán Medvegy =

Hungarian chess grandmaster (born 1979)

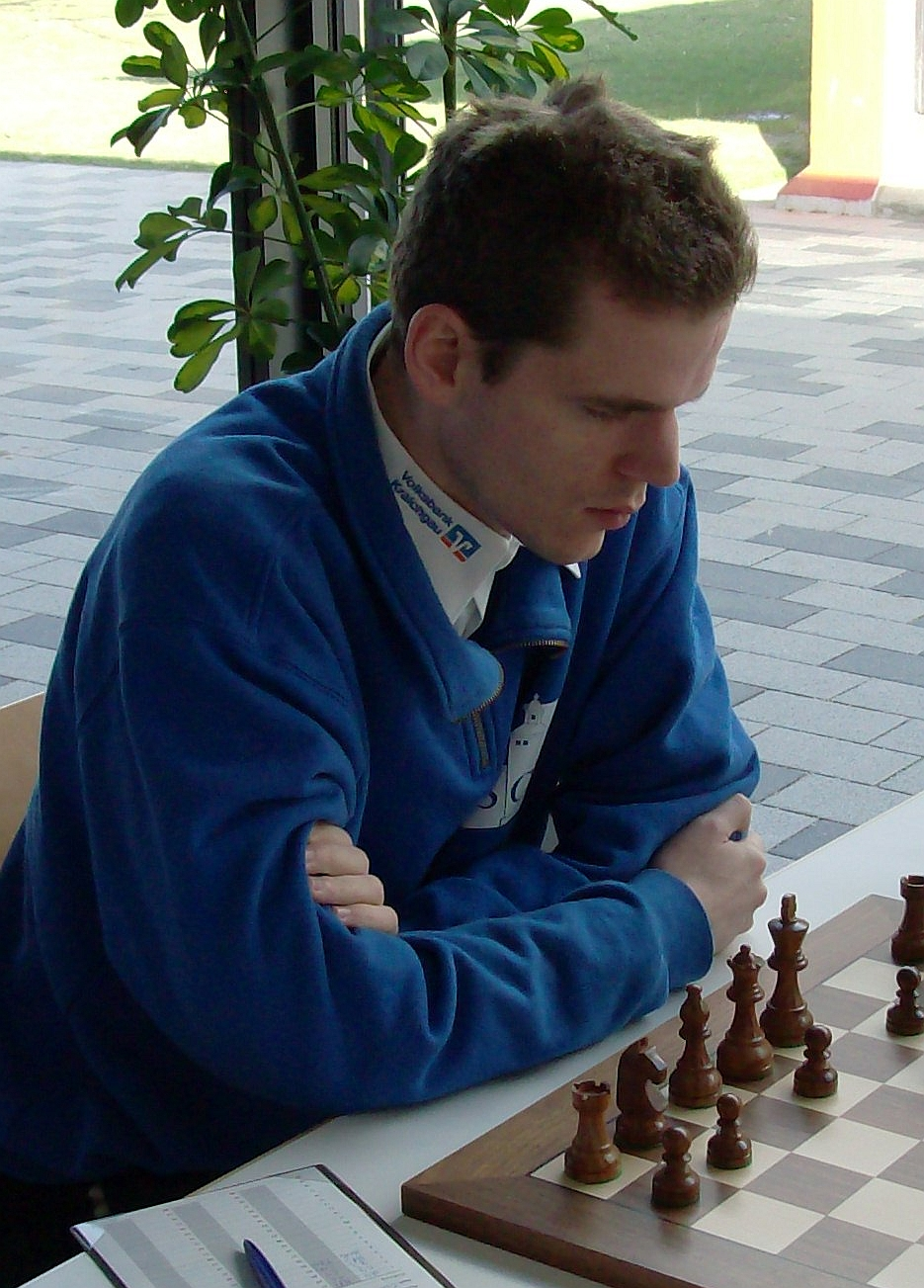

Personal information
- Born: March 21, 1979 (age 47) Budapest, Hungary

Chess career
- Country: Hungary
- Title: Grandmaster (2002)
- FIDE rating: 2505 (July 2026)
- Peak rating: 2572 (January 2013)

Zoltán Medvegy is a Hungarian chess grandmaster.

== Chess career ==
He has served on the Hungarian Chess Association’s youth committee, alongside Miklós Galyas and Julianna Terbe.

In August 2016, he tied for third place with Dušan Popović in the ZMDI Open, scoring 6.5/9.

In September 2024, he was the captain of the Hungary B team in the 45th Chess Olympiad.

== Personal life ==
He earned a PhD in the study of decision-making in chess from the Hungarian University of Sports Science.
