= CD Santa Fe =

Spanish football club

Santa Fe
- Full name: Club Deportivo Santa Fe
- Founded: 1931
- Ground: Las Américas, Santa Fe, Granada, Spain
- Capacity: 2,500
- Chairman: (Spain) Juan José Anguita
- League: División de Honor – Group 2
- 2024–25: Primera Andaluza Granada, 1st of 16 (champions)
Home colours	Away colours

Club Deportivo Santa Fe is a football team based in Santa Fe, Granada. Founded in 1931, they play in División de Honor – Group 2. The club's home ground is Estadio Las Américas.

== Season to season ==
Season	Tier	Division	Place	Copa del Rey
1968–69	4	1ª Reg.	5th	
1969–70	4	1ª Reg.	2nd	
1970–71	4	1ª Reg.	10th	
1971–72	5	2ª Reg.	4th	
1972–73	5	2ª Reg.	9th	
1973–74	5	2ª Reg.	7th	
1974–75	5	2ª Reg.	6th	
1975–76	6	2ª Reg.	9th	
1976–77	6	2ª Reg.	4th	
1977–78	7	2ª Reg.	1st	
1978–79	6	1ª Reg.	18th	
1979–80	7	2ª Reg.	14th	
1980–81	6	1ª Reg.	2nd	
1981–82	5	Reg. Pref.	3rd	
1982–83	5	Reg. Pref.	4th	
1983–84	5	Reg. Pref.	3rd	
1984–85	5	Reg. Pref.	9th	
1985–86	5	Reg. Pref.	9th	
1986–87	5	Reg. Pref.	2nd	
1987–88	5	Reg. Pref.	4th	

Season	Tier	Division	Place	Copa del Rey
1988–89	5	Reg. Pref.	9th	
1989–90	5	Reg. Pref.	16th	
1990–91	6	1ª Reg.	1st	
1991–92	5	Reg. Pref.	6th	
1992–93	5	Reg. Pref.	12th	
1993–94	5	Reg. Pref.	10th	
1994–95	5	Reg. Pref.	6th	
1995–96	5	Reg. Pref.	5th	
1996–97	5	Reg. Pref.	3rd	
1997–98	5	Reg. Pref.	7th	
1998–99	5	Reg. Pref.	10th	
1999–2000	5	Reg. Pref.	10th	
2000–01	5	Reg. Pref.	4th	
2001–02	5	Reg. Pref.	2nd	
2002–03	5	Reg. Pref.	1st	
2003–04	4	3ª	17th	
2004–05	4	3ª	11th	
2005–06	4	3ª	18th	
2006–07	5	1ª And.	2nd	
2007–08	5	1ª And.	1st	

Season	Tier	Division	Place	Copa del Rey
2008–09	4	3ª	14th	
2009–10	4	3ª	14th	
2010–2018	DNP			
2018–19	8	3ª And.	1st	
2019–20	7	2ª And.	5th	
2020–21	7	2ª And.	3rd	
2021–22	7	1ª And.	11th	
2022–23	7	1ª And.	5th	
2023–24	7	1ª And.	1st	
2024–25	7	1ª And.	1st	
2025–26	6	Div. Hon.		

- 5 seasons in Tercera División
