= Ingris =

Ingris may refer to:

- Eduard Ingriš, Czech-American composer, photographer, conductor and adventurer
- Ingris Rivera, Colombian chess player
