= Carlos Pesantes Carbajal =

Peruvian chess player (born 1951)

Personal information
- Born: 28 September 1951 (age 74) Trujillo, Peru

Chess career
- Country: Peru
- Title: FIDE Master (1989)
- Peak rating: 2335 (July 1988)

Carlos Pesantes Carbajal (born 28 September 1951) is a Peruvian chess FIDE master (FM) (1989), Peruvian Chess Championship winner (1974).

== Biography ==
Carlos Pesantes Carbajal is from Trujillo. He won the Peruvian Chess Championship in 1974. In 1977 in Santa Cruz de la Sierra Carlos Pesantes Carbajal participated in the 9th Pan-American Chess Championship and ranked in 10th place.

Carlos Pesantes Carbajal played for Peru in the Chess Olympiads:

- In 1972, at fourth board in the 20th Chess Olympiad in Skopje (+5, =5, −7),
- In 1992, at second reserve board in the 30th Chess Olympiad in Manila (+1, =1, −3).
