= Orestes Rodríguez Vargas =

Peruvian chess grandmaster (1943–2024)

Personal information
- Born: 4 July 1943 Lima, Peru
- Died: 17 November 2024 (aged 81) Barcelona, Spain

Chess career
- Country: Peru (until 1992); Spain (after 1992)
- Title: Grandmaster (1978)
- Peak rating: 2500 (January 1990)

Orestes Rodríguez Vargas (4 July 1943 – 17 November 2024) was a Peruvian chess Grandmaster (GM) (1978), representing Spain from 1982, five-times Peruvian Chess Championship winner (1968, 1969, 1970, 1971, 1972), Chess Olympiad individual silver medal winner (1978), Pan American Chess Championship medalist (1970).

== Biography ==
From the mid-1960s to the first half of the 1980s, Rodríguez Vargas was one of Peru's leading chess players. He five times in row won Peruvian Chess Championship: 1968, 1969, 1970, 1971, and 1972. In 1970, in Havana Orestes Rodríguez Vargas won silver medal in Pan American Chess Championship. In 1969, in Mar del Plata (shared 6th–7th place) and in 1972 in São Paulo (shared 6th–7th place) he twice participated in World Chess Championship South American zonal. With chess club CE Vulcà Barcelona Orestes Rodríguez Vargas five times won Spanish Team Chess Championship (1980, 1981, 1982, 1983, 1995). His chess tournament successes include 2nd place in Buenos Aires (1973), 1st place in Reggio Emilia chess tournament (1974/75), shared 3rd place in Lanzarote (1976), 2nd place in Alicante (1977), shared 1st place in Terrassa (1989), 3rd place in Salamanca (1990), and 3rd place (1990) and 2nd place (1991) in Barcelona.

Rodríguez Vargas played for Peru and Spain in the Chess Olympiads:

- In 1964, at fourth board in the 16th Chess Olympiad in Tel Aviv (+10, =7, -2),
- In 1970, at first board in the 19th Chess Olympiad in Siegen (+10, =4, -3),
- In 1972, at first board in the 20th Chess Olympiad in Skopje (+6, =6, -6),
- In 1978, at first board in the 23rd Chess Olympiad in Buenos Aires (+6, =4, -0) and won individual silver medal,
- In 1986, at first board in the 27th Chess Olympiad in Dubai (+3, =1, -1),
- In 1988, at second board in the 28th Chess Olympiad in Thessaloniki (+3, =7, -2),
- In 1992, at fourth board in the 30th Chess Olympiad in Manila (+4, =5, -0).

In 1972, Rodríguez Vargas was awarded the FIDE International Master (IM) title, and in 1978 was awarded FIDE Grandmaster (GM) title. He was the first chess player from Peru to gain the title.

Rodriguez Vargas died on 17 November 2024, at the age of 81.
