= Gianmarco Leiva =

Peruvian chess player (born 1995)

Personal information
- Born: 14 September 1995 (age 30)

Chess career
- Country: Peru
- Title: International Master (2013)
- Peak rating: 2449 (June 2017)

Gianmarco Leiva (also Giuseppe Leiva Rodríguez; born 14 September 1995) is a Peruvian chess International Master (2013), two-times Peruvian Chess Championship winner (2012, 2017).

== Chess career ==
Gianmarco Leiva twice participated in World Junior Chess Championships (2012, 2015).

Gianmarco Leiva twice won Peruvian Chess Championship: in 2012 and 2017.

In 2023 Gianmarco Leiva ranked in 8th place in American Continental Chess Championship and after American master Kirk Ghazarian declined to play replacement his in the Chess World Cup.

In 2023, in Baku Gianmarco Leiva participated in single-elimination Chess World Cup and won in 1st round to Slovenian Grandmaster Anton Demchenko but in 2nd round lost to Emirati Grandmaster Salem Saleh.

Gianmarco Leiva played for Peru in the Chess Olympiads:

- In 2012, at third board in the 40th Chess Olympiad in Istanbul (+3, =6, -2).

In 2021, he was awarded the FIDE International Master (IM) title.
