= Pedro García Toledo =

Peruvian chess player (born 1949)

Personal information
- Born: 1949 (age 76–77)

Chess career
- Country: Peru
- Peak rating: 2294 (July 2000)

Pedro García Toledo (born 1949) is a Peruvian chess player and winner of the 1980 Peruvian Chess Championship.

== Biography ==
Pedro García Toledo won the Peruvian Chess Championship in 1980. He participated in two South American Zonal tournaments, which were qualifying events for the FIDE World Chess Championship:

- in 1969 in Mar del Plata, sharing 16th-17th place;
- in 1975 in Fortaleza, finishing in 17th place.

In international team competitions, Pedro García Toledo played on the first board for Peru in the 1971 World Student Team Chess Championship in Mayagüez (+4, =1, -3), and on the second reserve board for Peru in the 1972 Chess Olympiad in Skopje (+0, =1, -4).

Pedro García Toledo studied psychiatry at the National University of San Marcos, and worked as a professor of medicine at the University of San Martín de Porres until 2016. His brothers Jorge and Javier are also chess players, the latter having also won a national championship in 1986.
