= Esteban Valderrama Quiceno =

Colombian chess player (born 1993)

Personal information
- Born: 15 August 1993 (age 33)

Chess career
- Country: Colombia
- Title: International Master (2018)
- Peak rating: 2448 (October 2021)
Medal record
Men's chess
Representing Colombia
Central American and Caribbean Games
Gold medal – first place	2026 Santo Domingo	First rapid board
Silver medal – second place	2023 San Salvador	First blitz board
Bronze medal – third place	2023 San Salvador	Second rapid board
Bolivarian Games
Gold medal – first place	2024 Ayacucho	Second rapid board
Gold medal – first place	2024 Ayacucho	Second blitz board
Gold medal – first place	2024 Ayacucho	Mixed team rapid board
Silver medal – second place	2024 Ayacucho	Mixed team blitz board

Esteban Alberto Valderrama Quiceno (born 15 August 1993), is a Colombian chess player. He was awarded the title of International Master by FIDE in 2018.

== Career ==
He was the Colombian champion in rapid (2018) and blitz (2013, 2018).

He came 2nd in the 2020 Colombian Chess Championship.

He qualified for the Chess World Cup 2021 where he was defeated by Varuzhan Akobian 2.5-1.5 in the first round.
