= Guillermo Ruiz =

Peruvian chess player (born 1943)

Personal information
- Born: April 4, 1943 (age 83) Lima, Peru

Chess career
- Country: Peru

Guillermo Ruiz (born April 4, 1943 in Lima, Peru) is a Peruvian chess master and US Life Master. He is the son of Aurora and Melquiades Ruiz. He has been married since 1974 and has two children.

Guillermo learned chess at the age of 17 from a friend and went on to win the championship of Lima and then the Peruvian Chess Championship in 1973. In 1978, he immigrated to the United States where he settled in Atlanta, Georgia. He is a four-time Georgia State Champion, winning in 1979, 1987, 1995, and 1996.

In 2002, he was awarded the Georgia Chess Association 2002 Award for Contributions to Georgia Chess Community.
