= Julio Súmar Casis =

Peruvian chess player (1931–2006)

Personal information
- Born: 24 July 1931
- Died: 28 de mayo del 2006

Chess career
- Country: Peru

Julio Súmar Casis (24 July 1931 – not earlier than 2007) was a Peruvian chess player, two-times Peruvian Chess Championship winner (1949, 1967).

== Biography ==
From the late 1940s to the late 1960s, Súmar was one of the leading Peruvian chess players. He won Peruvian Chess Championships in 1949 and 1967. In 1947, he shared 1st place with Felipe Pinzón Sánchez in Peruvian Chess Championship but lost additional match. In 1951, Súmar participated in FIDE South America Zonal tournament. In 1959, he shared 3rd place with Hermann Pilnik and Raúl Sanguineti in International Chess Tournament in Lima behind winners Borislav Ivkov and Luděk Pachman.

Súmar played for Peru in the Chess Olympiads:

- In 1950, at second board in the 9th Chess Olympiad in Dubrovnik (+2, =1, -12),
- In 1964, at second board in the 16th Chess Olympiad in Tel Aviv (+7, =3, -8),
- In 1970, at second board in the 19th Chess Olympiad in Siegen (+5, =3, -4).
