= Sam Quinones =

American journalist

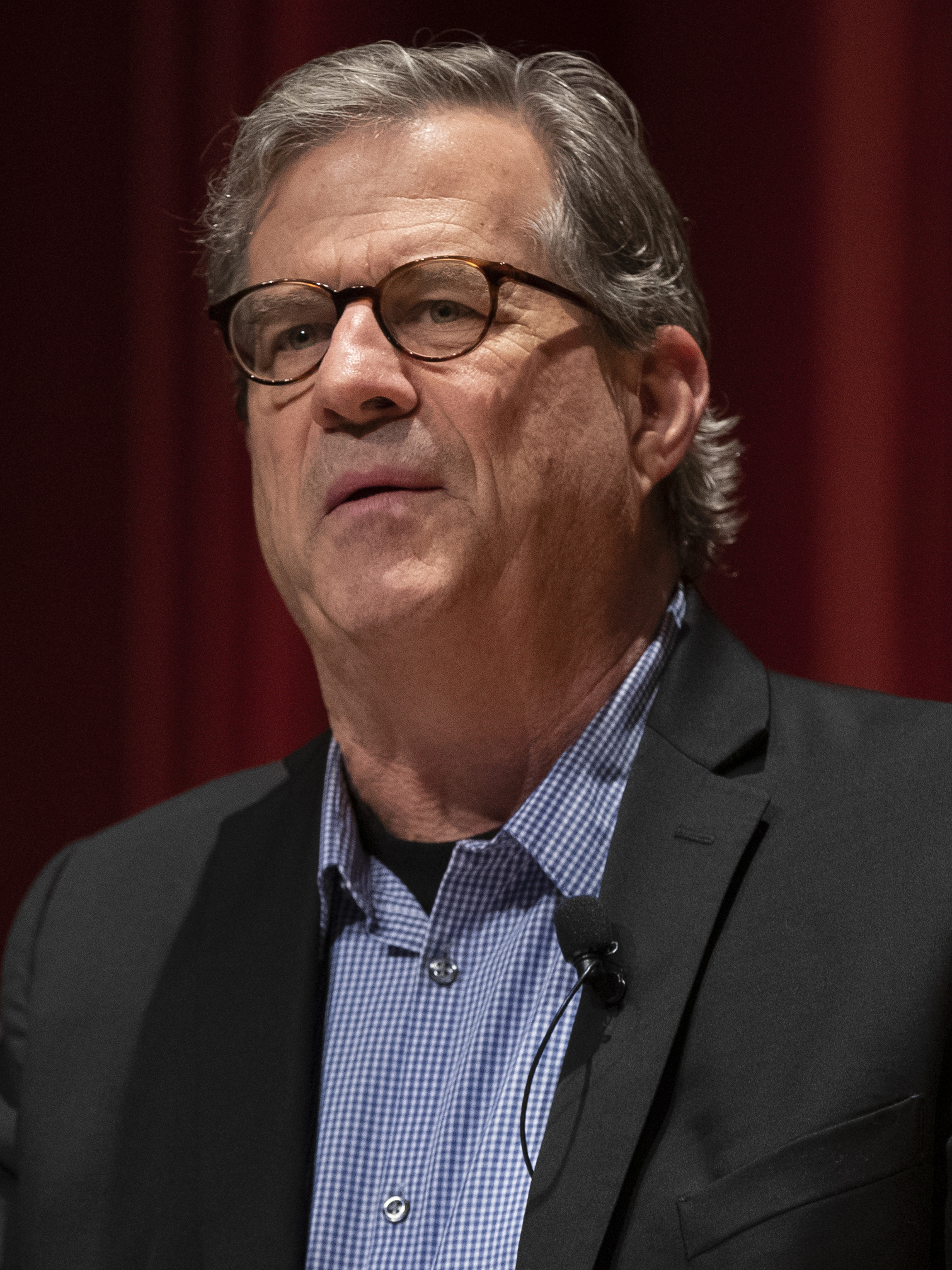
- Quinones in 2022
- Born: Claremont, California, U.S.
- Education: University of California, Berkeley
- Occupation: Journalist
- Known for: Reporter for the Los Angeles Times
- Notable work: Antonio's Gun and Delfino's Dream: True Tales of Mexican Migration; True Tales from Another Mexico: The Lynch Mob, the Popsicle Kings, Chalino and the Bronx Dreamland: The True Tale of America's Opiate Epidemic The Virgin of the American Dream "The Least of Us: True Tales of America and Hope in the Time of Fentanyl and Meth"

The surname Quinones is of Spanish language origin. In Spanish, it is spelled Quiñones.

Sam Quinones (/kiˈnjoʊ.neɪs/ kin-YOH-ness;) is an American journalist and author of four books of narrative nonfiction. He is based in Los Angeles, California. Quinones is best known for his reporting on Mexico and Mexican communities in the United States, as well as for his work chronicling the opioid crisis in America, particularly through his 2015 book Dreamland, followed by The Least of Us in 2021.

He has worked as a reporter since 1987 and is currently a freelance journalist. Quinones was a staff writer for the Los Angeles Times from 2004 to 2014.

== Early life and education ==
Quinones grew up in Claremont, California. He graduated from Claremont High School in 1977 and later attended the University of California, Berkeley, where he earned Bachelor of Arts degrees in Economics and American History.

== Career ==
=== Journalism ===
Quinones began his journalism career in 1987 at the Orange County Register. He later worked as a crime reporter for Stockton Record for four years. In 1992, he moved to Seattle, where he served as a political reporter for the Tacoma News-Tribune.

In 1994, Quinones relocated to Mexico, where he worked as a freelance reporter. He returned to the United States in 2004 to join the Los Angeles Times, covering immigration issues and gang-related stories.

In 2013, he took a leave of absence from the Times to work on his book Dreamland, which explores the opioid epidemic in the United States. The book focuses on the widespread abuse of prescription painkillers, such as OxyContin, and the rise of Mexican black-tar heroin, particularly distributed by traffickers from the town of Xalisco, Nayarit.

Quinones left the Los Angeles Times in 2014 to pursue freelance writing full-time. His work has since appeared in publications including National Geographic, Pacific Standard, The New York Times, Los Angeles Magazine, and others.

In 2021, he published The Least of Us: True Tales of America and Hope in the Time of Fentanyl and Meth, which chronicles the rise of synthetic drugs in Mexico, particularly the shift from plant-based narcotics to those manufactured from chemicals.

The Atlantic published an excerpt from The Least of Us titled "I Don’t Know That I Would Even Call It Meth Anymore," detailing how large-scale production of methamphetamine in Mexico contributed to increasing rates of homelessness and mental illness across the United States.

Throughout his career, Quinones has continued writing magazine features and opinion pieces. In November 2012, he wrote about attempts to reform the Mexican indigenous governance system known as usos y costumbres ("uses and customs"), which some critics argue marginalizes migrants to the United States and fosters tensions between returning migrants and those who remain in their home villages.

Comedian Marc Maron interviewed Quinones twice on his podcast WTF with Marc Maron. In January 2017, he appeared in an interview with journalist Sally Wiggin of WTAE Pittsburgh, where they discussed Dreamland and the opioid crisis affecting Pennsylvania and other U.S. states.

Also in January 2017, Quinones published an op-ed in the Los Angeles Times titled "The Truth Is Immigrants Have Let Us Live Like Princes," arguing that immigrant labor has contributed significantly to the Southern California economy.

In October 2022, he wrote an article for Los Angeles Magazine titled "Skid Row Nation," exploring how methamphetamine trafficking, tent encampments, and court rulings contributed to the growth of homelessness and mental illness in Los Angeles.

In June 2023, Quinones published a piece in The Atlantic titled "America's Approach to Addiction Has Gone Off the Rails," in which he argued that law enforcement—and a reimagined approach to incarceration—are necessary components of a compassionate response to the overdose crisis.

In February 2024, he wrote for The Free Press about how towns such as Hazard in Eastern Kentucky are turning to small-scale local enterprises to recover from the economic and social damage caused by the opioid crisis and the decline of the coal industry.

=== Books ===
- True Tales from Another Mexico: The Lynch Mob, the Popsicle Kings, Chalino and the Bronx (University of New Mexico Press, 2001) is a collection of nonfiction stories portraying life on the margins of Mexican society and a country undergoing transition. Among the narratives are accounts of a colony of drag queens preparing for Mexico's oldest gay beauty contest; a Michoacán village where the entire community makes a living producing popsicles; the gritty neighborhood of Tepito; the story of Aristeo Prado, the last valiente of his wild and violent rancho in Michoacán; the legend of Jesús Malverde, the narco-saint of Sinaloa; Oaxacan Indian basketball players preserving tradition in Los Angeles; a lynching in a small town in Hidalgo; and the only known biography of Chalino Sánchez, an immigrant narcocorrido singer gunned down after a concert who went on to become a musical icon and one of the most influential artists to emerge from Los Angeles in a generation.
- Antonio's Gun and Delfino's Dream: True Tales of Mexican Migration (University of New Mexico Press, 2007), is a collection of nonfiction stories about Mexican immigrants and their lives on both sides of the U.S.–Mexico border, based on Quinones's reporting in Mexico. Stories include the tale of the "Henry Ford of velvet painting" in El Paso/Juárez; the emergence of a vibrant opera scene in the bustling border city of Tijuana; a season in the life of a high school soccer team in Garden City, Kansas; and the account of how drug-trafficking Mennonites in Chihuahua forced Quinones to leave Mexico. Interwoven throughout the book is the story of Delfino Juarez, a young construction worker who first sought opportunity in Mexico City, and later moved to Los Angeles when the capital failed to meet his expectations.
- Dreamland: The True Tale of America's Opiate Epidemic (Bloomsbury Press, 2015) tells the story of the evolving opioid epidemic in the United States and its connections to developments in Mexico. Quinones documents the explosion in heroin use and how a small town in Mexico transformed the way heroin was produced and distributed across the United States.
- The Virgin of the American Dream: Guadalupe on the Walls of Los Angeles is Quinones's first book of photojournalism. It documents murals of the Virgin of Guadalupe painted on walls and buildings across Los Angeles. These murals often serve as a deterrent to graffiti and tagging, a practice that originated in Mexico.
- The Least of Us: True Tales of America and Hope in the Time of Fentanyl and Meth (Bloomsbury Publishing, 2021) is a follow-up to Dreamland. It explores the rise of synthetic drugs such as fentanyl and methamphetamine, while also highlighting stories of Americans engaged in efforts to rebuild their communities in the face of addiction and social breakdown.

=== Other professional activities ===
In 1998, Quinones was awarded an Alicia Patterson Fellowship for a series of stories on impunity in Mexican villages. In 2008, he received the Maria Moors Cabot prize from Columbia University in recognition of his career excellence in covering Latin America.

In 2011, he launched a storytelling initiative on his website called Tell Your True Tale, aimed at encouraging new writers to share their personal stories. As of the latest count, the site had published over 50 stories.

In February 2012, Quinones began a blog titled True Tales: A Reporter's Blog, focused on topics such as Los Angeles, Mexico, migration, culture, drugs, neighborhoods, the border, and storytelling.

Following the release of Dreamland in April 2015, Quinones delivered 265 talks over the next four and a half years. He spoke in small towns, universities, and at professional conferences attended by judges, narcotics officers, doctors, public health officials, social workers, and addiction counselors, among others.

He has lectured at more than 50 universities across the United States. In January 2018, he testified before the U.S. Senate Committee on Health, Education, Labor, and Pensions. In 2012, he delivered a lecture at the University of Arizona titled "So Far from Mexico City, So Close to God: Stories of Mexican Immigrants and of Mexico's Escape from History."

== Personal life ==
Quinones resides in Southern California.

== Awards and honors ==
- Dreamland: The True Tale of America's Opiate Epidemic won the 2015 National Book Critics Circle Award for Nonfiction.
- In 2022, the National Book Critics Circle nominated The Least of Us as one of the best nonfiction books of 2021.
