= Fernando Fernández Sánchez =

Peruvian chess player (born 1990)

Personal information
- Born: 7 July 1990 (age 36)

Chess career
- Country: Peru
- Title: International Master (2017)
- Peak rating: 2472 (October 2017)

Fernando Miguel Fernández Sánchez (born 7 July 1990) is a Peruvian chess International Master (IM) (2017), Peruvian Chess Championship winner (2016).

== Biography ==
In 2016, Fernando Fernández Sánchez won Peruvian Chess Championship. In 2017, in Barcelona he won International Chess Tournament XIX Obert Internacional Sant Martí.

Fernando Fernández Sánchez played for Peru in the Chess Olympiad:

- In 2016, at reserve board in the 42nd Chess Olympiad in Baku (+2, =1, -2).

In 2017, he was awarded the FIDE International Master (IM) title.
