= Kirk Ghazarian =

American chess grandmaster (born 2006)

Personal information
- Born: 2006 (age 19–20) Irvine, California

Chess career
- Country: United States
- Title: Grandmaster (2024)
- FIDE rating: 2546 (July 2026)
- Peak rating: 2546 (June 2026)

Kirk Vagho Ghazarian is an American chess grandmaster.

== Chess career ==
In June 2020, he finished second at the Pan-Armenian Chess Tournament.

In January 2023, he was named to the All-America Chess Team.

In February 2023, he finished tied for second place at the Rochefort Chess Festival Masters 2023, and secured the runner-up position ahead of Harsha Bharathakoti, Momchil Nikolov, and Peio Duboue due to better tiebreaks.

He qualified to play at the Chess World Cup 2023, but was unable to attend the event and was replaced by Gianmarco Leiva.

In January 2024, he earned his final GM norm by defeating Miklos Galyas at the NYC Chess Norms event. He was awarded the Grandmaster title in December 2024, after his rating surpassed 2500.
