= Felipe Pinzón Sánchez =

Peruvian chess player (1917–2015)

Personal information
- Born: 23 August 1917
- Died: May 2015

Chess career
- Country: Peru

Felipe Pinzón Sánchez or Felipe Pinzón Solis (23 August 1917 – May 2015) was a Peruvian chess player, four-times Peruvian Chess Championship winner (1947, 1950, 1951, 1952).

== Biography ==
From the late 1930s to the mid-1960s, Felipe Pinzón Sánchez was one of the leading Peruvian chess players. He won Peruvian Chess Championships four times: in 1947 (shared 1st place with Julio Súmar Casis and won additional match), 1950, 1951 and 1952. In 1951, Felipe Pinzón Sánchez participated in FIDE South America Zonal tournament.

Felipe Pinzón Sánchez played for Peru in the Chess Olympiads:

- In 1939, at second board in the 8th Chess Olympiad in Buenos Aires (+3, =2, -8),
- In 1950, at fourth board in the 9th Chess Olympiad in Dubrovnik (+5, =5, -5),
- In 1964, at reserve board in the 16th Chess Olympiad in Tel Aviv (+5, =2, -1).
