= Henry Urday Cáceres =

Peruvian chess grandmaster (born 1967)

Personal information
- Born: July 5, 1967 (age 59) Lima, Peru

Chess career
- Country: Peru
- Title: Grandmaster (1992)
- FIDE rating: 2482 (July 2026)
- Peak rating: 2490 (July 1992)

Henry Alejandro Urday Cáceres is a Peruvian chess grandmaster.

== Chess career ==
He won the Peruvian Chess Championship in 1987 and 1999.

In 1992, he won the Capablanca Memorial held in Matanzas.

In July 1999, he won the Schahin Cury Tournament held in São Paulo.

He played for Peru in all Chess Olympiads from the 27th Chess Olympiad to the 33rd Chess Olympiad.
