= Santiago Avila Pavas =

Colombian chess grandmaster (born 2004)

Personal information
- Born: May 21, 2004 (age 22)

Chess career
- Country: Colombia
- Title: Grandmaster (2023)
- FIDE rating: 2492 (October 2026)
- Peak rating: 2522 (May 2023)

Santiago Avila Pavas (born 2004) is a Colombian chess player who received the FIDE title of Grandmaster (GM) in 2023.

== Chess career ==
Avila Pavas won the 2017 Under-20 Valle del Cauca Championship.

Avila Pavas qualified for the Chess World Cup 2023, where he was defeated by Ilya Smirin on tiebreaks in the first round.
