= Miklós Galyas =

Hungarian chess grandmaster (born 1978)

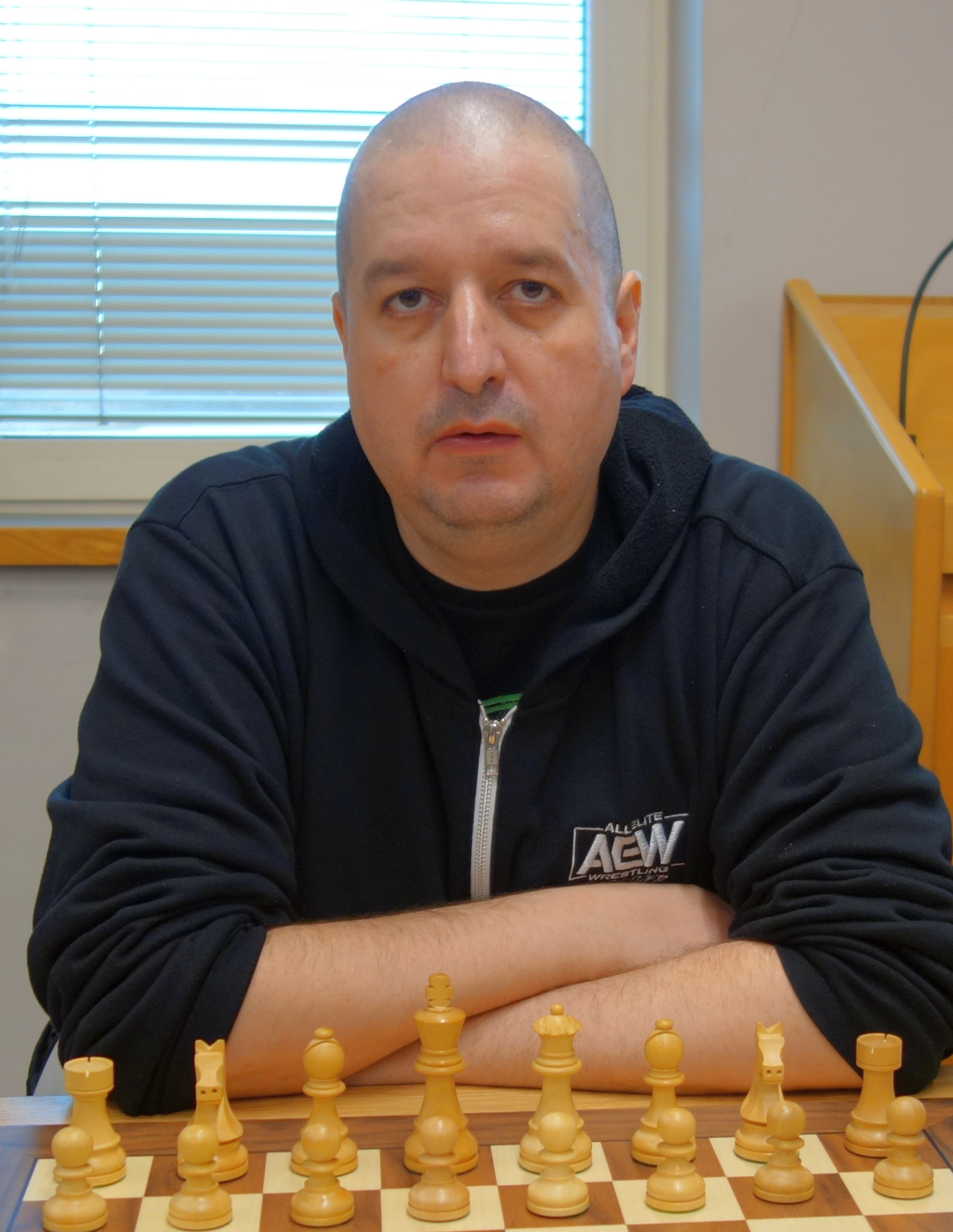
- Galyas in 2023

Personal information
- Born: September 25, 1978 (age 47)

Chess career
- Country: Hungary
- Title: Grandmaster (2023)
- Peak rating: 2517 (July 2018)

Miklós Galyas (Hungarian: Galyas Miklós, Hungarian pronunciation: [ɡɒjɒʃ mikloːʃ]) is a Hungarian chess grandmaster.

== Chess career ==
He earned the Grandmaster title in 2023, after having achieved his norms at the:

- Dr. Hetenyi Geza Memorial GM Group B in December 2017
- Budapest Spring Festival in April 2018
- Vezerkepzo Pentecost GM in May 2023

In January 2024, he finished third in the first Podmaniczky Chess Tournament. Later that month, he lost to Kirk Ghazarian at the NYC Chess Norms event, earning Ghazarian his final GM norm.

In September 2024, he captained the Hungarian women's B team at the 45th Chess Olympiad in Budapest.
