= Ineymig Hernández Gil =

Cuban chess player (born 2004)

Personal information
- Born: 2004 (age 21–22) Camagüey, Cuba

Chess career
- Country: Cuba
- Title: Woman International Master (2022)
- Peak rating: 2348 (March 2020)

Ineymig Hernández Gil is a Cuban chess player.

== Chess career ==
In February 2022, she finished in 5th place at the Cuban Women's Championship with a score of 6.5/11.

In May 2025, she played in the Open section of the Varadero International Capablanca tournament, where she defeated grandmaster Pepe Cuenca in the third round.

In September 2026, she played for Cuba in the 46th Chess Olympiad, where she scored an undefeated 8/9 across her games and won the individual silver medal on board 4.
