= Renato Terry =

Peruvian chess player (born 1992)

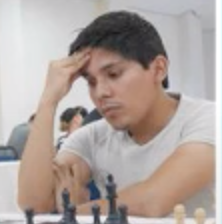

Personal information
- Born: February 22, 1992 (age 34) Trujillo, Peru

Chess career
- Country: Peru
- Title: International Master (2017)
- FIDE rating: 2508 (July 2026)
- Peak rating: 2526 (July 2024)

Renato Alfredo Terry Luján is a Peruvian chess player.

== Chess career ==
He won the Peruvian Chess Championship in 2008 and 2015.

In August 2022, he played for Peru in the 44th Chess Olympiad, where he defeated grandmaster Abhijeet Gupta in the eighth round, helping his team defeat the India-C team.

In October 2023, he finished in second place in the month's first Bullet Brawl tournament, losing the championship to grandmaster Daniel Naroditsky.

In June 2024, he tied for second in the Continental Americas Championship 2024, and was ranked in 7th overall.

In July 2024, he finished in third place in the month's Bullet Brawl tournament, notably finishing ahead of strong grandmasters and speed-chess specialists José Martínez Alcántara, Olexandr Bortnyk, and Hikaru Nakamura.
