= Ashley Castillo =

Panamanian chess player (born 2008)

Personal information
- Born: Ashley Alexandra Castillo Beitia; 22 August 2009 (age 17) Changuinola, Panama

Chess career
- Country: Panama
- Title: International Master (2026); Woman FIDE Master (2024)
- Peak rating: 2211 (February 2026)

Ashley Alexandra Castillo Beitia (born 22 August 2009) is a Panamanian chess player who holds the title of International Master (IM). She earned the IM title by winning the open 2025 U18 Central American and Caribbean Continental Championship at age 16, and it was conferred a few months later after she reached the required FIDE rating. She is the first woman from Central America to become an IM.
