= Estadio Las Américas =

Football stadium in Ayacucho, Peru

Estadio Las Americas
- Interactive map of Estadio Las Americas
- Location: Ayacucho, Peru
- Owner: Municipalidad Distrital de San Juan Bautista
- Capacity: 6,400
- Surface: Grass

Construction
- Opened: 2024

Estadio Las Américas is a football stadium located in the San Juan Bautista District of Ayacucho, Peru. Opened in 2024, the stadium has a capacity of 6,400. It is the secondary stadium for Ayacucho FC while their new stadium is being built. The stadium was the main venue for the 2024 Bolivarian Games which was held in Ayacucho, hosting the opening and closing ceremony of the event.
