= Ingrid Aliaga Fernández =

Peruvian chess player (born 1991)

Personal information
- Born: Ingrid Yadyra Aliaga Fernández; 15 December 1991 (age 34) Lima, Peru

Chess career
- Country: Peru
- Title: Woman International Master (2018)
- Peak rating: 2208 (March 2018)

Ingrid Yadyra Aliaga Fernández (born 15 December 1991) is a Peruvian chess player who holds the title of Woman International Master. She is an eight-time winner of the Peruvian Women's Chess Championship and has represented Peru at five Chess Olympiads.

== Biography ==
Ingrid Aliaga started to play chess at the age of 9. She was champion in the national youth category starting with the female under 10 category, later in the under 12, under 14, under 16, under 18, under 20 categories. At age 14 she became champion of her first national categoría mayores femenino in Peru en el año 2006.

She made several appearances at the Pan American Girls' Chess Championship; in 2003, in Bogotá she finished second in the under 12 age group; in 2006 she won in the under 16 age group; in 2008 she won in the under 20 age group; in 2009 she won in the under 18 age group.

She has won the Peruvian Women's Chess Championship eight times, in 2006 2007, 2009, 2010, 2011, 2012, 2016, 2020 Campeonato Nacional Femenino de Ajedrez

In 2010, in Hatay she made her debut at the Women's World Chess Championship, where in the first round she lost to Antoaneta Stefanova. In 2012, in Khanty-Mansiysk she again participated in the Women's World Chess Championship, where in the first round she draw to Viktorija Čmilytė.

She has played for Peru at six Chess Olympiads (2004, 2006, 2008, 2010, 2012 and 2016).

She was awarded the Woman FIDE Master (WFM) in 2004, and as a result of her performance in the 2017 Women's Continental Championship in Buenos Aires she was awarded the Woman International Master (WIM) title in 2018.

She finished her professional career in Economics at the University of San Martín de Porres.
