= Nilda Maria =

Nilda Maria Gonçalves de Pina Fernandes, commonly known as Nilda Maria, is a Cape Verdean politician and social advocate. She serves as a member of parliament representing the South Santiago electoral area and is the president of the Cape Verdean Solidarity Foundation.

== Biography ==
Maria has gained prominence for her efforts in addressing Cape Verde's housing deficit. She has been a vocal supporter of "Operation Hope," a government initiative aimed at providing housing for all citizens. This project, by its fourth anniversary, had benefited over 18,000 people, including Cape Verdeans in the diaspora communities of Mozambique and São Tomé and Príncipe.

As president of the Cape Verdean Solidarity Foundation since at least 2009, Maria leads an organization dedicated to improving living conditions for vulnerable members of society. The foundation focuses particularly on women who are heads of households, people with disabilities, and the elderly. Her efforts with fouindation are aimed at addressing challenges facing Cape Verde, particularly in the areas of housing and social support for marginalized groups.
