= José Andrés Pérez =

Mexican footballer and manager (born 1972)

Personal information
- Full name: José Andrés Pérez Jaime
- Date of birth: 26 September 1972 (age 54)
- Place of birth: León, Guanajuato, Mexico
- Position: Defender

Team information
- Current team: Atlético Leonés (Manager)

Senior career*
Years	Team	Apps	(Gls)
1996–2000	León	20	(0)
2001–2002	La Piedad	30	(1)
2002–2005	Veracruz	68	(0)
2005	Tabasco	11	(0)

Managerial career
- 2010–2018: Club León Reserves and Academy
- 2022–: Atlético Leonés
- * Club domestic league appearances and goals

José Andrés Pérez Jaime (born September 26, 1972) is a Mexican football manager and former player.
