= Nilda Urquiza =

Argentine journalist and classical guitarist

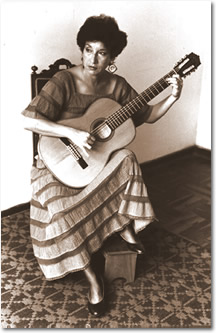
- Born: Córdoba, Argentina
- Occupations: Journalist and classical guitarist

Nilda Carmen Urquiza is an Argentine guitarist and journalist. Having trained in Buenos Aires, she spent almost two decades in Peru, where she taught guitar and served as the music critic for El Comercio, before returning to her native country.

== Early life and education ==
Nilda Urquiza was born in Córdoba, Argentina. When she was 2 years old, her family moved to Buenos Aires. There, her father brought her at a young age to the Teatro Colón to hear the virtuoso guitarist Andrés Segovia, which left a tremendous impact on the young girl, who pursued music with her father's support. Later on, Segovia would become one of her teachers.

Urquiza began taking private guitar lessons and later enrolled in the Conservatorio Nacional Carlos López Buchardo (which is now part of the Universidad Nacional de las Artes), studying under the legendary María Luisa Anido. She graduated as a music teacher specializing in guitar.

== Career ==
At 22 years old, Urquiza was hired for her first professional job as an instructor at the Instituto Cuyano de Cultura Musical in Mendoza. There, she met her future husband, the Peruvian artist Óscar Quiñones, whom she was married to until his death in 1987.

She later followed her husband to Peru, where she was invited to perform around Lima and teach at the Escuela Superior de Música. She also began to work as a journalist, joining the Federation of Journalists of Peru and the Association of Women Journalists. For almost a decade, she served as the music critic for the newspaper El Comercio. She also wrote a column for the cultural publication Contacto. And, while in Peru, she was named an honorary cultural attaché at the Argentine Embassy there.

On July 16, 1992, a car bomb exploded in front of Urquiza's building at Tarata and Alcanfores in Miraflores; what became known as the Tarata bombing killed dozen of people and injured many more. The incident drove her to return to Buenos Aires after 18 years in Peru. There, she dove back into the Argentine music world and began teaching again at her alma mater and elsewhere, as well as performing across the city, including at the Teatro Colón and Centro Cultural Recoleta. She also continued her journalism career, becoming director of the Universidad Nacional de las Artes' magazine Notas y Notas, and contributing to the Argentine Guitar Circle's magazine and the cultural publication Dominé.
