= BAP Quiñones =

Three ships of the Peruvian Navy have been named BAP Quiñones after Peruvian military aviator José Quiñones Gonzales:

- BAP Capitán Quiñones (CL-83), commissioned in 1960, was a Crown Colony-class cruiser.
- BAP Quiñones (DD-76), commissioned in 1980, was a Friesland-class destroyer.
- BAP Quiñones (FM-58), commissioned in 2006, is a Lupo-class frigate.
