= Óscar Quiñones (artist) =

Peruvian painter and sculptor

Óscar Edgardo Quiñones (July 3, 1919 in Ancash – September 30, 1987 in Lima) was a Peruvian painter and sculptor. Quiñones was especially well known for his murals, some of which decorate buildings at the National University of San Marcos. He was a pupil of David Alfaro Siqueiros.

== Early life ==
The son of Zenaida Sifuentes Bernuy and Obdulio Quiñones de León Marreros, Óscar Quiñones was born in Ancash two months premature and would live in Lambayeque from the first month of his life. Later, the family moved to Lima, where he studied at the College of Our Lady of Guadalupe, along with his cousin, José Abelardo Quiñones, the hero of Peruvian aviation. Even from childhood he felt artistically inclined, which was not well received by the families of power in Lima during that era. His early childhood was spent studying languages, swimming, and spending time with friends. These friendships were maintained with the likes of Chabuca Granda, Pablo de Madalengoitia, Walter and Kiko Ledgard from their youth until their deaths.

In his youth, his political ideology brought him along with Armando Villanueva del Campo, Alberto Franco Valera (father of Rodrigo Franco Montes and godfather to his daughter) and other young people full of the idealistic spirit to form a circle of unconditional followers of Victor Raúl Haya de la Torre, founder of APRA. He went on to travel the world as an actor and made appearances in movies like La Lunareja and Becquer's Great Love among others. He also dabbled in theater.

== Influences and mentors ==
In the early 1950s, he took refuge in Argentina, where he met his first mentor: Benito Quinquela Martin. Afterwards, he became a protégé of Antonio Berni and Enea Spilimbergo. In 1954, he received the Grand Prize for Foreign Painters, awarded by the Escuela Nacional de Bellas Artes de Buenos Aires.

In his travels he met three colleagues whom he admired greatly: Pablo Picasso, Henry Moore, and Diego Rivera, who introduced him to muralism, converting him into a disciple protégé. In Mexico, he befriended another prominent Mexican artist, David Alfaro Siquieros. Inspired by the hospitality, humility, and advice of these great artists, he devoted himself to the visual arts and graduated from the Instituto de Artes Gráficas Guttemberg in Buenos Aires.

In 1960, he was awarded the Prize of the Association of Art Critics of the Republic of Argentina for his work, "Cristo de la Chimenea."

== Expositions and critical reception ==
Quiñones participated in the Art Biennials of Venecia and São Paulo. He put on over 100 individual exhibitions in Brazil, Argentina, Uruguay, Chile, Mexico, Finland, the U.S., Japan, Peru, Ecuador, and the Arab States. In Ecuador, he met and became friends with Oswaldo Guayasamín. Abel Nasser (predecessor of Yasser Arafat) invited him to the Arab States. Even today, one can appreciate "Dia y Noche para Cesar Vallejo" on Buenos Aires' Avenida Corrientes and "Cielo Ande" in the city of Necochea.

"Quiñones is an unusual painter. As soon as he is furious, he is calm." - Jorge Luis Borges

"Quiñones begins to convey his message through a language that is unmistakably his own. His internal artistic intensity and emotional capacity for communication have been enough to make him one of the best representations of today's American painter. He borrows purity and honesty from Cezanne, optics from the "fauves," a vibrant craze from color as an expressive function, and the motivation for an infinite inspiration from the long-suffering America that he knows so well." - Manual Mujica Láinez

"Quiñones: friend, great Peruvian expressionist artist, South American, above all - American." - Andre Malraux

His artistic life permitted him to become friends with Vinicius de Moraes, Caribe, Humberto Vilchez Vera, Marina Nunez del Prado, Francisco Petrone, Fernando Lamas, Jorge Luis Borges, Manuel Scorza, Manuel Mujica Láinez, Mario Castro Arenas, José Morón Vizcarra, and colleagues such as Rufino Tamayo, Víctor Humareda, Lautaro Murúa, Niní Marshall, Raúl Soldi, Santiago Antúnez de Mayolo, and André Malraux, whom he met through his mentor Picasso and with whom he exchanged letters until Malraux's death. He also knew other well-known figures from the art, political, and intellectual worlds.

== Later works ==
Quiñones returned to Peru with his wife, Argentinian soloist Nilda Urquiza. He was hired by Dr. Luis Alberto Sánchez to sculpt friezes at the National University of San Marcos in Lima. The school of law has one example of Quiñones' friezes, which has a record-size surface of 500 m2.

After settling in Lima, he built the "Monument for the Mother" in Chincha in the Ica region as a tribute to his firstborn son, Pablo Martín, who died a few days after birth.

Juan Manuel Ugarte Elespuru referred to Quiñones as an excellent friend, speaking of his, "humane personality, energy, virility drive?, enthusiasm, vital and prodigal generosity, and vibrant warmth."
