= Óscar Quiñones (chess player) =

Peruvian chess player (born 1941)

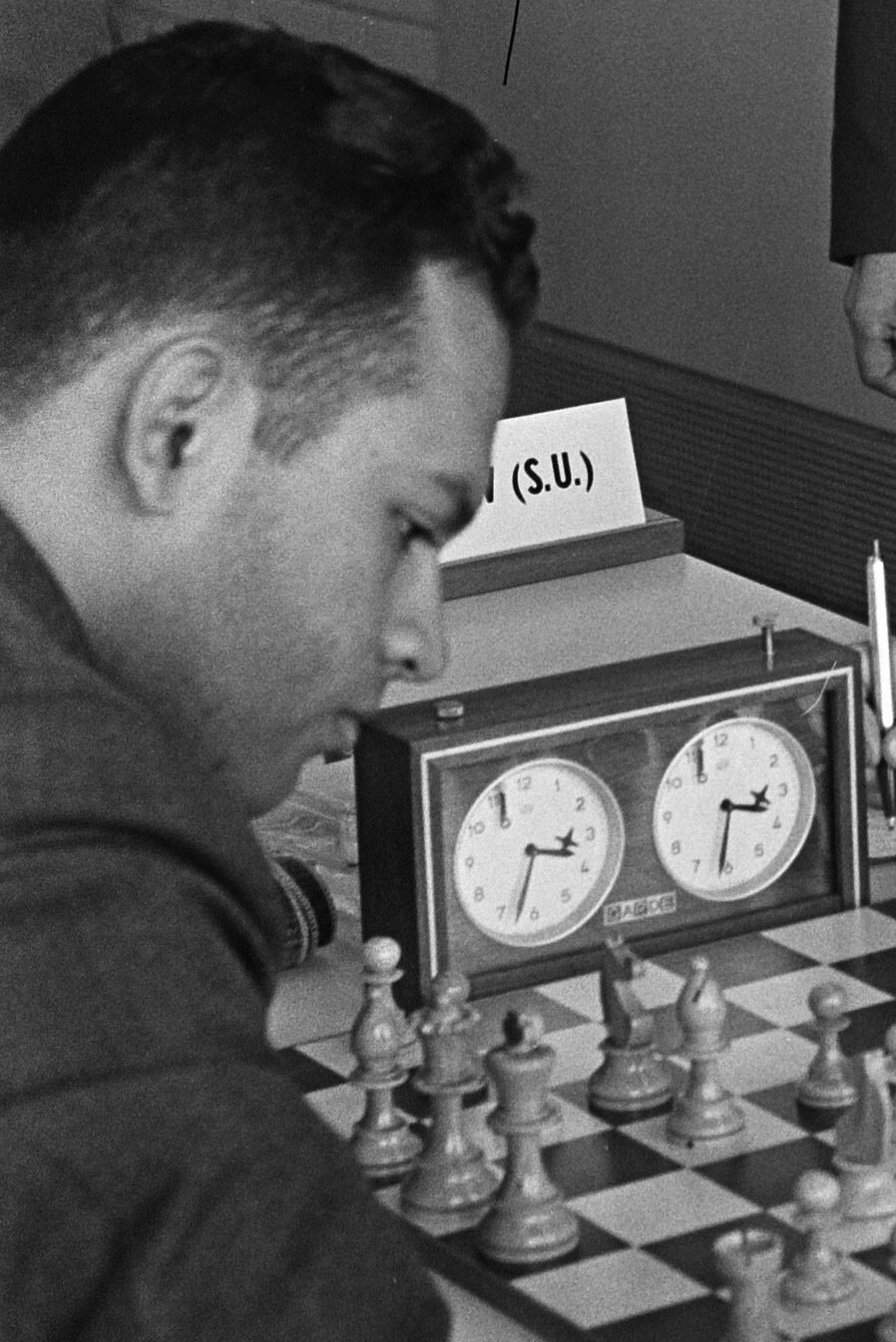
- Quiñones in 1964

Personal information
- Born: 14 January 1941 Lima, Peru
- Died: 5 May 2026 (aged 85) Lima, Peru

Chess career
- Country: Peru
- Title: International Master (1963)
- Peak rating: 2360 (January 1977)

Óscar Quiñones Carrillo (Note: In this Hispanic American name, the first or paternal surname is Quiñones and the second or maternal family name is Carrillo.) (14 January 1941 – 5 May 2026) was a Peruvian chess player.

== Career ==
He took 9th at Lima 1959 (Borislav Ivkov and Luděk Pachman won), finished 15th at Mar del Plata 1961 (Miguel Najdorf won), tied for third through fifth place at Fortaleza 1963 (zonal, Héctor Rossetto won) and won at Rio de Janeiro 1964 (zonal playoff), finished in 20th place at Amsterdam 1964 (interzonal). Up till mid-80s, he remained the only player from Peru to participate in Interzonal and was the first player from Peru to obtain the Chess International Master Title.

He took fifth place at Santiago de Chile 1965 (Vasily Smyslov won), tied for 11-13th at Río Hondo 1966 (zonal), tied for 11-12th at São Paulo 1972 (zonal, Henrique Mecking won), took 11th at Camagüey 1974 (11th Capablanca Memorial, B tournament, Raymond Keene won), tied for 5-7th at Cienfuegos 1976 (13th Capablanca Memorial, C tournament).

Quiñones played for Peru in Chess Olympiads:

- In 1964, at first board in 16th Chess Olympiad in Tel Aviv (+5 –7 =7);
- In 1970, at third board in 19th Chess Olympiad in Siegen (+7 –5 =4);
- In 1972, at second board in 20th Chess Olympiad in Skopje (+6 –5 =6).

He was awarded the International Master title in 1963.
