= Ingris Rivera =

Colombian chess player (born 1988)

Personal information
- Born: 1988 (age 37–38)

Chess career
- Country: Colombia
- Title: Woman International Master (2006)
- Peak rating: 2262 (December 2015)

Ingris Rivera (born 1988) is a Colombian chess player who holds the FIDE title of Woman International Master (WIM, 2006). She is a two-time Colombian Women's Chess Championship winner (2005, 2015).

== Biography ==
In 2001, Ingris Rivera won Pan American Youth Girl's Chess Championship in the U14 age group. In 2007, she won Pan American Junior Girl's Chess Championship in the U20 age group. Rivera has twice won the Colombian Women's Chess Championship: in 2005 and 2015. In 2006, she participated in the Women's World Chess Championship by knock-out system and lost to Maia Chiburdanidze in the first round.

Rivera played for Colombia in the Women's Chess Olympiads:

- In 2002, at third board in the 35th Chess Olympiad (women) in Bled (+5, =4, -5),
- In 2014, at third board in the 41st Chess Olympiad (women) in Tromsø (+4, =2, -3),
- In 2016, at fourth board in the 42nd Chess Olympiad (women) in Baku (+6, =2, -2),
- In 2018, at third board in the 43rd Chess Olympiad (women) in Batumi (+2, =0, -5).

In 2006, she was awarded the FIDE Woman International Master (WIM) title.

Rivera was ranked best female chess player in Colombia in May 2020.
