= Hans-Ulrich Grünberg =

German chess player (born 1956)

Personal information
- Born: 9 January 1956 (age 70) Schwerin, Germany

Chess career
- Country: Germany
- Title: International Master (1982), International Correspondence Chess Grandmaster (1990)
- Peak rating: 2530 (July 1991)

Hans-Ulrich Grünberg (born 9 January 1956) is a German chess International Master (IM, 1982) and International Correspondence Chess Grandmaster (1990) who two times won East Germany Chess Championship (1980, 1989) and won 16th European Correspondence Chess Championship (1981).

== Tournament chess ==
At the age of eight Hans-Ulrich Grünberg learned to play chess. In the 1970s he won the East Germany Student Chess Championship and the East Germany Youth Chess Championship twice each. In 1975 he won East Germany Blitz Chess Championship. In 1980 and 1989 he was the sole winner of the East Germany Chess Championships. In 1987 he shared this victory with Raj Tischbierek and Thomas Pähtz but lost additional tournament. He was called up to fights for the East Germany chess team several times. In 1990 he participated with the East Germany team in the Chess Olympiad in Novi Sad.

Before German reunification Hans-Ulrich Grünberg played with Buna Halle-Neustadt, Warts Strausberg, Lokomotiv Schwerin and Empor HO Berlin. In the German Chess Bundesliga he played from 1990 to 1993 with the Münchener SC 1836 and from 1994 to 1996 with PSV Duisburg with whom he also played at the European Chess Club Cup participated in 1994. In 1996 he was hired by SC Pasing in the Oberliga Bayern and later rose with the club to the 2nd Chess Bundesliga on. In the 2002/03 season he played for the Schachfreunde Schwerin, from 2003 to 2015 for PSV Rostock (since 2007: SSC Rostock 07), with whom he played in the season 2014/15 played in the 1st Chess Bundesliga. In the late 1990s and early 2000s he played in the Austrian Team Chess Championship at SC Inter Salzburg.

His Elo rating is 2373 (as of July 2023), Grünberg's highest Elo rating to date was 2530 in July 1991 - a clear indication that he was very close to becoming a Grandmaster. He has held the title of International Master since 1982.

== Correspondence chess ==
Although Hans-Ulrich Grünberg preferred playing board games, he began playing long distance correspondence chess tournaments in 1970. Here he qualified through victories in European tournaments to participate in the 16th European Correspondence Chess Championship, which he finished in 1981 as the winner with 11 wins and 2 draws. After that he represented the East Germany in the final of the 10th Correspondence Chess Olympiad (1987–1995). In 1990 he became International Correspondence Chess Grandmaster, later he hardly ever played correspondence chess.

== Private ==
Hans-Ulrich Grünberg studied mathematics in Halle from 1976 to 1981 at the Martin Luther University of Halle-Wittenberg.
