= Pähtz =

Pähtz, Paehtz is a German surname. Notable people with the surname include:

- Elisabeth Pähtz (born 1985), German chess master
- Thomas Pähtz (born 1956), German chess master
