= Wockenfuss =

Wockenfuss is a German surname. Notable people with the surname include:

- John Wockenfuss (1949–2022), American professional baseball player and manager
- Klaus Wockenfuss (born 1951), German chess master
