= Ursula Liebert =

German chess player (1933–1998)

Personal information
- Born: 13 July 1933
- Died: 2 July 1998 (aged 64)

Chess career
- Country: East Germany; Germany

Ursula Liebert (13 July 1933 – 2 July 1998), née Höroldt, also Altrichter, was a German chess player. She was a two-time winner of the East Germany Women's Chess Championship (1954, 1967).

== Biography ==
From the early 1950s to the late 1960s, she was one of the leading chess players in East Germany. Member of Halle sports club USV Halle. In 1953, she won the 3rd place in the all Germany Women's Chess Championship. In 1954, for the first time she won the East German Women's Chess Championship. In the following years, the East Germany Women's Chess Championships she ranked in the award-winning places: 3rd place in 1956, 2nd in 1958, 3rd place in 1961. In 1967, East Germany Women's Chess Championship she shared first place with Waltraud Nowarra. The additional match between the two chess players ended in a draw (2–2), and both players were awarded the champions title.

Ursula Liebert played for East Germany in the Women's Chess Olympiad:

- In 1957, at second board in the 1st Chess Olympiad (women) in Emmen (+6, =7, -1) and won the team bronze medal.

Successfully participated in senior chess tournaments. In 1991, she was second in the German Senior Women's Chess Championship.

Graduated from the Martin Luther University of Halle-Wittenberg Faculty of Mathematics. She was married to an International master Heinz Liebert (born 1936).
