= Georg Stein =

German chess player

Personal information
- Born: 17 April 1909
- Died: 1980s

Chess career
- Country: Germany

Georg Stein (17 April 1909 – 1980s) was a German chess player who won East Germany Chess Championship (1951).

== Chess career ==
At the age of 16 Georg Stein won the Koblenz City Chess Championship in 1925. He then won this city championships several times, including in 1930 and 1935. One of his greatest successes was winning the 2nd East Germany Chess Championship in 1951 in Schwerin ahead of Wolfgang Pietzsch. His highest historical Elo rating was 2433 in February 1951, which put him at number 256 in the world. His highest world ranking by historical Elo rating was 214 in January 1949. Nothing more is known about Stein's death.

At the German Chess Championship 1948 in Essen Georg Stein won the following game with a white pieces against Rudolf Teschner:

1. e4 e5 2. Nf3 Nc6 3. Bb5 Nf6 4. 0–0 Nxe4 5. Re1 Nd6 6. Ba4 Be7 7. Nxe5 Nxe5 8. Rxe5 0–0 9. d4 Bf6 10. Re2 Nf5 11. c3 d5 12. Bf4 Be7 13. Nd2 Bd6 14. Bxd6 Nxd6 15. Re5 c6 16. Bc2 g6 17. Qf3 Kg7 18. Rae1 Qf6 19. Qg3 Bf5 20. Bxf5 Nxf5 21. Qg4 Rad8 22. f4 Nd6 23.R1e3 Rde8 24. Rh3 Qd8 25. Nf3 f6 26. Reh5 Rh8 27. f5 Qe7 28. Rxh7+ Rxh7 29. Qxg6+ Kf8 30. Rxh7 Qe3+ 31. Kh1 Qc1+ 32. Ng1 Qg5 33. Rh8+ Ke7 34. Rxe8+ Nxe8 35. Qxg5 fxg5 36. g4 Nd6 37. Nf3 Nc4 38. b3 Ne3 39. h3 Nd1 40. c4 1:0
