= Maria Scheffold =

German chess player

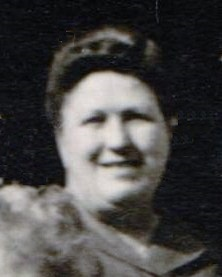
- Maria Scheffold in Dahn in 1959

Personal information
- Born: 1912
- Died: 1970 (aged 57–58)

Chess career
- Country: Germany

Maria Scheffold (1912 – 1970) was a German chess player who won West Germany Women's Chess Championship (1960).

== Chess career ==
Maria Scheffold won the Württemberg Women's Chess Championship in 1955 and shared 5th place at the West Germany Women's Chess Championship in 1956 in Wolfratshausen. In November 1960, Maria Scheffold won West Germany Women's Chess Championship in Büdingen.

She took part in other West Germany Women's Chess Championships:

- in 1955 in Krefeld, winner Friedl Rinder;
- in 1957 in Lindau, winner Helga Axt;
- in 1959 in Dahn, winner Friedl Rinder;
- in 1961 in Wennigsen, winner Helga Axt;
- in 1965 in Wangen im Allgäu, winner Ottilie Stibaner.

She was a member of chess club SC Wangen.
