= Borulya =

Borulya (Ukrainian: Боруля) is a Ukrainian surname. Notable people with the surname include:

- Ekaterina Borulya (born 1969), German chess master
- Martin Borulya, fictional character:
  - from the 1892 eponymous play by Ukrainian author Ivan Karpenko-Karyi
  - from the 1953 Soviet comedy drama TV film Martin Borulya
