= Hannelore Lucht =

German chess player

Personal information
- Born: unknown
- Died: unknown

Chess career
- Country: Germany

Hannelore Lucht (unknown – unknown) was a German chess player who won the West Germany Women's Chess Championship (1963).

== Chess career ==
Hannelore Lucht from Dortmund won the West Germany Women's Chess Championship in Krefeld in October 1963, ahead of Anneliese Brandler.

She took second place in the 1964 West Germany Women's Chess Championship in Bremen, behind Irmgard Kärner from Starnberg.

== Literature ==
- Deutsche Damenmeisterschaft 1963 (German Women's Championship 1963). Schach-Echo 1963, Issue 21, title page 2
- Deutsche Damenmeisterschaft 1964 (German Women's Championship 1964). Schach-Echo 1964, Issue 19, title page 2, as well as pages 318 and 329/30 (games)

== Sources ==
- Bulletin of the 18th German Women's Championship, Bremen 27.9. – 10.10.1964
- German Women's Chess Championships: reports, photos and overview since 1939 from Gerhard Hund
