= Lucht =

Lucht is a surname. Notable people with the surname include:

- David A. Lucht (born 1943), American engineer and fire safety advocate
- Ed Lucht (born 1931), Canadian basketball player
- Ernst Lucht (1896–1975), German admiral
- Hannelore Lucht, German chess master
- Walter Lucht (1882–1949), German general
