= German Chess Championship =

The German Chess Championship has been played since 1861, and determines the national champion. Prior to 1880, three different federations organized chess activities in Germany: the Westdeutscher Schachbund (WDSB), the Norddeutscher Schachbund (NDSB) and the Mitteldeutscher Schachbund (MDSB). Each one organized its own championship. In 1880, the nationwide Deutscher Schachbund was founded, so afterwards only one German championship was played.

Starting from 1933, the Nazi Party took control of all social activities and until 1943 all chess championships were organized by the Großdeutscher Schachbund. After the end of World War II, separate championships were played in the occupied zones. Afterwards, from 1950 to 1989, two national championships were held in the Federal Republic of Germany and the German Democratic Republic. After the reunification of Germany in 1989, a single tournament has been played.

== Championships, 1861–1932 ==
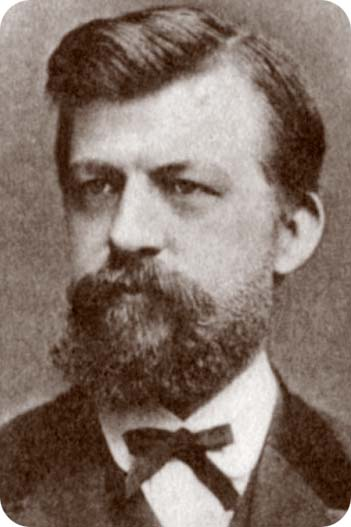
Max Lange

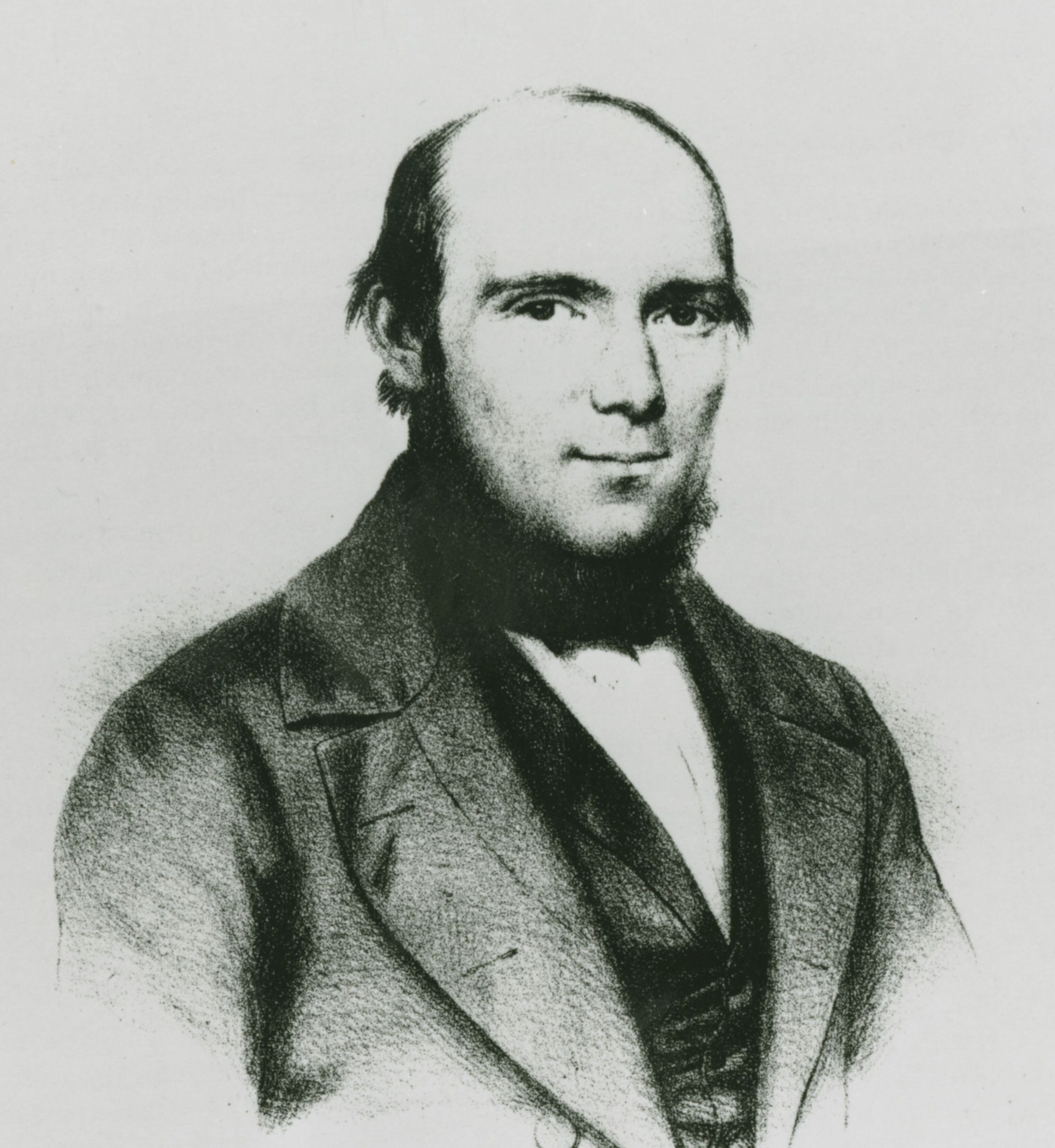
Adolf Anderssen

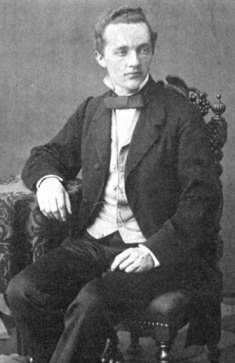
Louis Paulsen

=== WDSB-Congresses, 1861–1880 ===
#	Year	City	Winner
1	1861	Düsseldorf	no masters participated
2	1862	Düsseldorf	Max Lange
3	1863	Düsseldorf	Max Lange
4	1864	Düsseldorf	Max Lange
5	1865	Elberfeld	Gustav Neumann
6	1867	Cologne	Wilfried Paulsen
7	1868	Aachen	Max Lange
8	1869	Barmen	Adolf Anderssen
9	1871	Krefeld	Louis Paulsen
10	1876	Düsseldorf	Wilfried Paulsen
11	1877	Cologne	Johannes Zukertort
12	1878	Frankfurt	Louis Paulsen
13	1880	Braunschweig	Louis Paulsen

=== MDSB-Congresses, 1871–1877 ===
#	Year	City	Winner
1	1871	Leipzig	Adolf Anderssen
2	1876	Leipzig	Adolf Anderssen
3	1877	Leipzig	Louis Paulsen

=== NDSB-Congresses, 1868–1872 ===
#	Year	City	Winner
1	1868	Hamburg	Max Lange
2	1869	Hamburg	Adolf Anderssen
3	1872	Altona	Adolf Anderssen

=== German Congresses, 1879–1932 ===
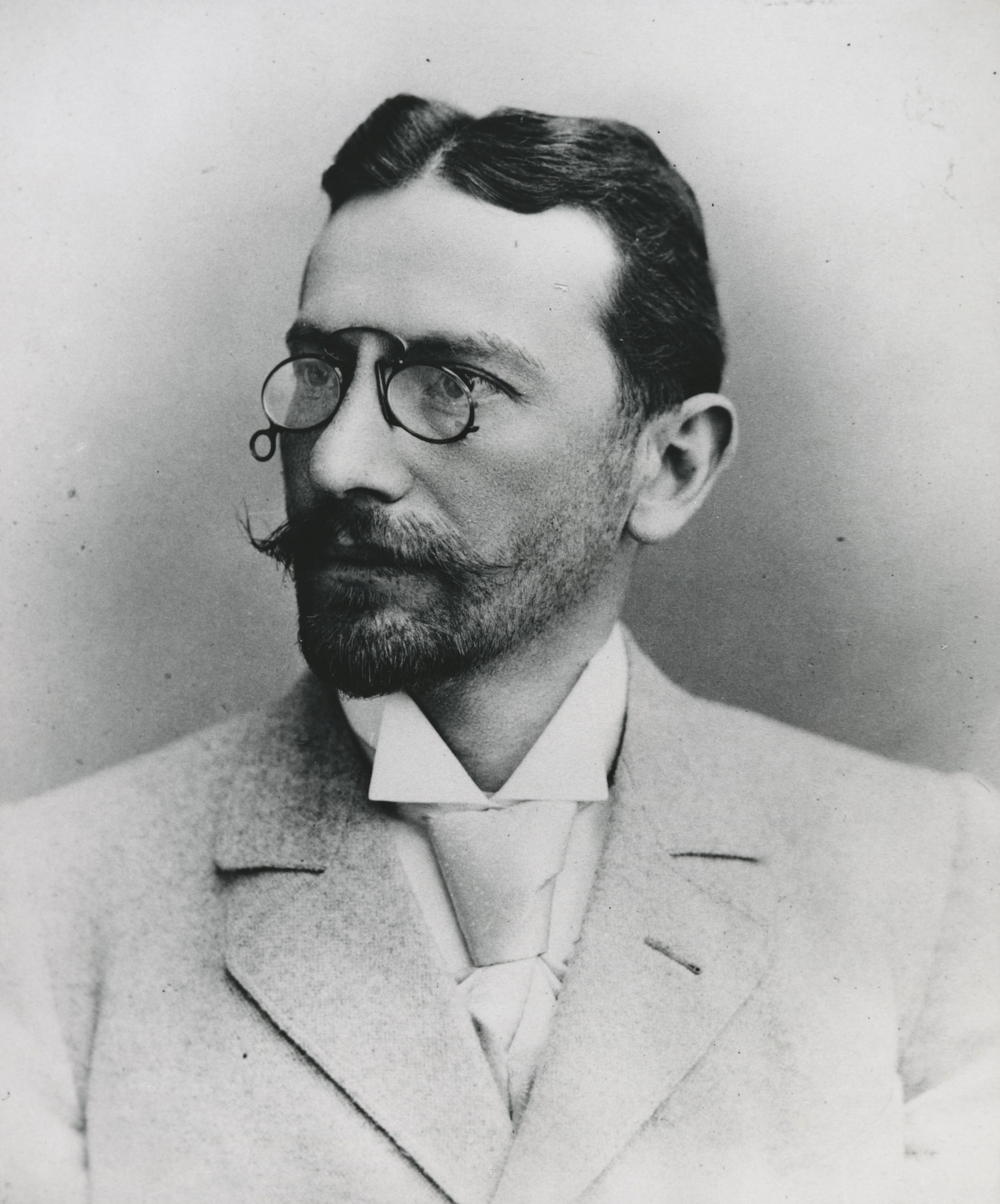
Siegbert Tarrasch

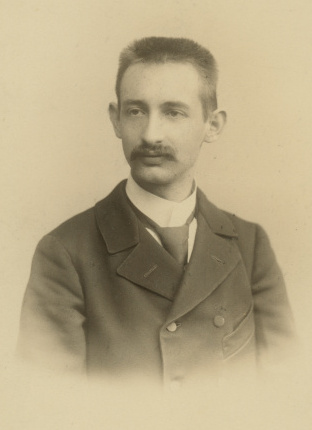
Carl Schlechter

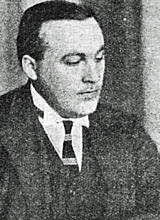
Efim Bogoljubow

#	Year	City	Winner
1	1879	Leipzig	Berthold Englisch
2	1881	Berlin	Joseph Henry Blackburne
3	1883	Nuremberg	Simon Winawer
4	1885	Hamburg	Isidor Gunsberg
5	1887	Frankfurt	George Henry Mackenzie
6	1889	Breslau	Siegbert Tarrasch
7	1892	Dresden	Siegbert Tarrasch
8	1893	Kiel	Carl Walbrodt; Curt von Bardeleben
9	1894	Leipzig	Siegbert Tarrasch
10	1896	Eisenach	Robert Henry Barnes
11	1898	Cologne	Amos Burn
12	1900	Munich	Géza Maróczy; Harry Nelson Pillsbury; Carl Schlechter
13	1902	Hannover	Dawid Janowski
14	1904	Coburg	Curt von Bardeleben; Carl Schlechter; Rudolf Swiderski
15	1906	Nuremberg	Frank James Marshall
16	1908	Düsseldorf	Frank James Marshall
17	1910	Hamburg	Carl Schlechter
18	1912	Breslau	Oldřich Duras; Akiba Rubinstein
19	1914	Mannheim	Alexander Alekhine
20	1920	Berlin	Friedrich Sämisch
21	1921	Hamburg	Ehrhardt Post
22	1922	Bad Oeynhausen	Ehrhardt Post
23	1923	Frankfurt	Ernst Grünfeld
24	1925	Breslau	Efim Bogoljubow
25	1927	Magdeburg	Rudolf Spielmann
26	1929	Duisburg	Carl Ahues
27	1931	Swinemünde	Efim Bogoljubow; Ludwig Rödl
28	1932	Bad Ems	Georg Kieninger

== German Championships, 1933–1949 ==
=== Championships in Nazi Germany, 1933–1943 ===
#	Year	City	Winner
1	1933	Bad Pyrmont	Efim Bogoljubow
2	1934	Bad Aachen	Carl Carls
3	1935	Bad Aachen	Kurt Richter
4	1937	Bad Oeynhausen	Georg Kieninger
5	1938	Bad Oeynhausen	Erich Eliskases
6	1939	Bad Oeynhausen	Erich Eliskases
7	1940	Bad Oeynhausen	Georg Kieninger
8	1941	Bad Oeynhausen	Paul Felix Schmidt; Klaus Junge
9	1942	Bad Oeynhausen	Ludwig Rellstab
10	1943	Vienna	Josef Lokvenc

=== Western and Soviet zones championships, 1946–1953 ===
==== Western zone championships, 1947–1953 ====
#	Year	City	Winner
1	1947	Weidenau	Georg Kieninger
2	1948	Essen	Wolfgang Unzicker
3	1949	Bad Pyrmont	Efim Bogoljubow
4	1950	Bad Pyrmont	Wolfgang Unzicker
5	1951	Düsseldorf	Rudolf Teschner
6	1953	Leipzig	Wolfgang Unzicker

==== Soviet zone championships, 1946–1949 ====
#	Year	City	Winner
1	1946	Leipzig	Berthold Koch
2	1947	Weissenfels	Lothar Schmid
3	1948	Bad Doberan	Rudolf Teschner
4	1949	Bad Klosterlausnitz	Wolfgang Pietzsch

== West and East Germany championships ==
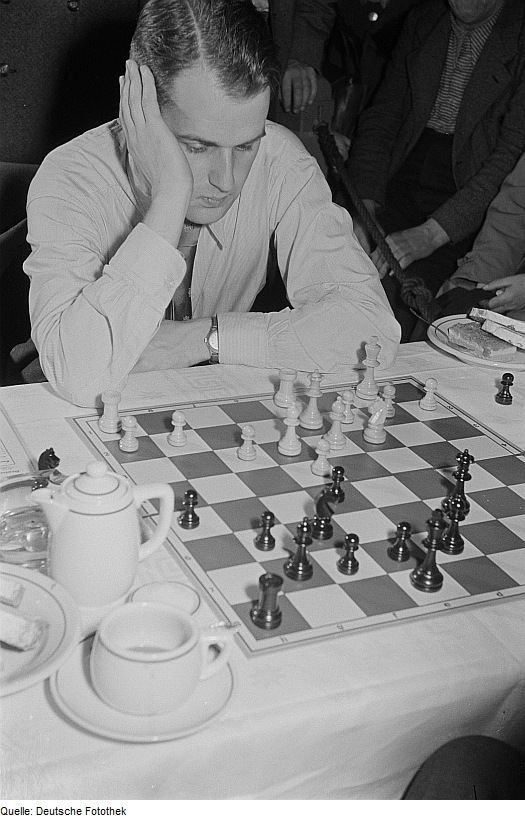
Wolfgang Unzicker

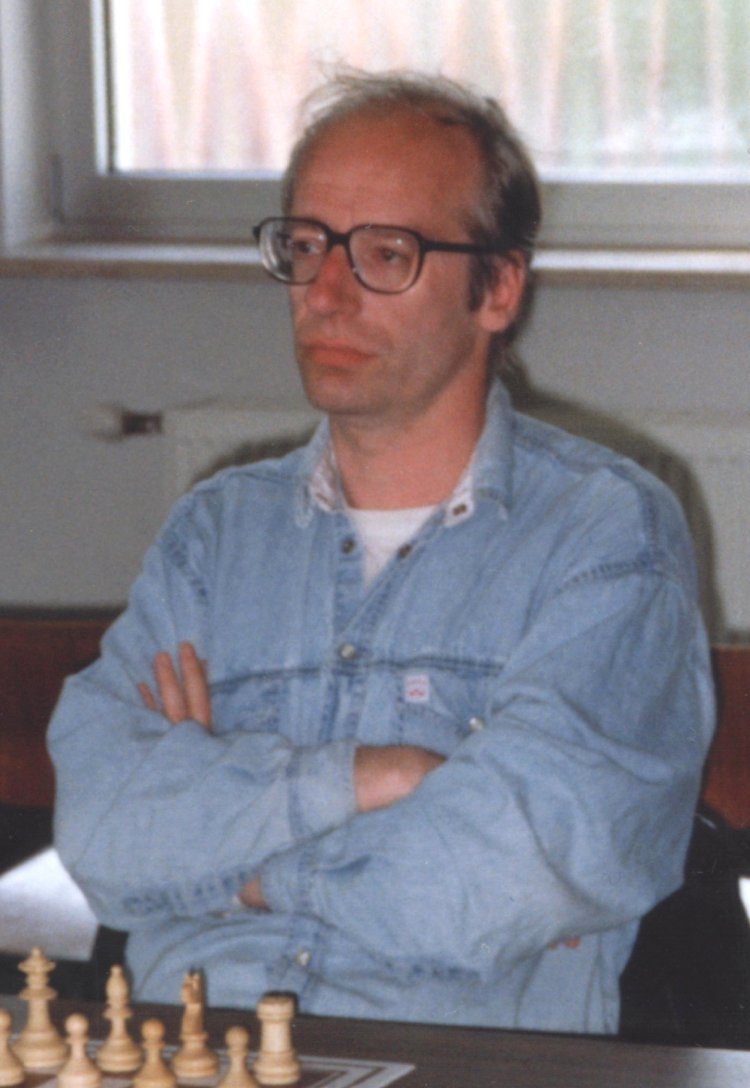
Robert Hübner

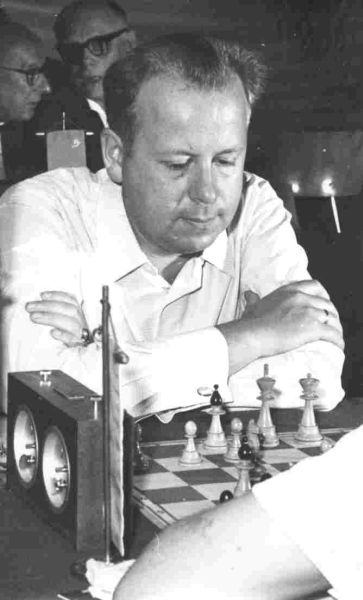
Wolfgang Uhlmann

=== West Germany championships, 1953–1989 ===
#	Year	City	Winner
1	1953	Berlin	Wolfgang Unzicker
2	1955	Frankfurt am Main	Klaus Darga
3	1957	Bad Neuenahr	Paul Tröger
4	1959	Nürnberg	Wolfgang Unzicker
5	1961	Bad Pyrmont	Klaus Darga
6	1963	Bad Pyrmont	Wolfgang Unzicker
7	1965	Bad Aibling	Wolfgang Unzicker, Helmut Pfleger
8	1967	Kiel	Robert Hübner, Hans Besser
9	1969	Königsfeld	Manfred Christoph
10	1970	Völklingen	Hans-Joachim Hecht
11	1971	Berlin	Svetozar Gligorić (international)
12	1972	Oberursel	Hans Günther Kestler
13	1973	Dortmund	Hans-Joachim Hecht, Ulf Andersson; Boris Spassky (international)
14	1974	Menden	Peter Ostermeyer
15	1975	Mannheim	Walter Browne (international)
16	1976	Bad Pyrmont	Klaus Wockenfuss
17	1977	Bad Lauterberg	Anatoly Karpov (international)
18	1978	Bad Neuenahr	Ludek Pachman
19	1979	Munich	Boris Spassky, Yuri Balashov; Ulf Andersson (international)
20	1980	Bad Neuenahr	Eric Lobron
21	1981	Bochum	Lubomir Kavalek (international)
22	1982	Bad Neuenahr	Manfred Glienke
23	1983	Hannover	Anatoly Karpov (international)
24	1984	Bad Neuenahr	Eric Lobron
25	1987	Bad Neuenahr	Vlastimil Hort, Ralf Lau
26	1988	Bad Lauterberg	Bernd Schneider
27	1989	Bad Neuenahr	Vlastimil Hort, Eckhard Schmittdiel

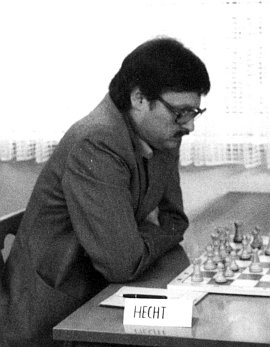
Hans-Joachim Hecht

=== East Germany championships, 1950–1990 ===
#	Year	City	Winner
1	1950	Sömmerda	Rudolf Elstner
2	1951	Schwerin	Georg Stein
3	1952	Binz	Berthold Koch
4	1953	Jena	Reinhart Fuchs
5	1954	Meerane	Wolfgang Uhlmann
6	1955	Zwickau	Wolfgang Uhlmann
7	1956	Leipzig	Reinhart Fuchs
8	1957	Sömmerda	Burkhard Malich
9	1958	Schkopau	Wolfgang Uhlmann
10	1959	Leipzig	Wolfgang Pietzsch
11	1961	Premnitz	Lothar Zinn
12	1962	Gera	Wolfgang Pietzsch
13	1963	Aschersleben	Günther Möhring
14	1964	Magdeburg	Wolfgang Uhlmann
15	1965	Annaberg-Buchholz	Lothar Zinn
16	1967	Colditz	Wolfgang Pietzsch
17	1968	Weimar	Wolfgang Uhlmann
18	1969	Schwerin	Lutz Espig
19	1970	Freiberg	Friedrich Baumbach
20	1971	Strausberg	Lutz Espig
21	1972	Görlitz	Manfred Schöneberg
22	1973	Erfurt	Burkhard Malich
23	1974	Potsdam	Rainer Knaak
24	1975	Stralsund	Wolfgang Uhlmann
25	1976	Gröditz	Wolfgang Uhlmann
26	1977	Frankfurt/Oder	Lothar Vogt
27	1978	Eggesin	Rainer Knaak
28	1979	Suhl	Lothar Vogt
29	1980	Plauen	Hans-Ulrich Grünberg
30	1981	Fürstenwalde	Wolfgang Uhlmann
31	1982	Salzwedel	Rainer Knaak
32	1983	Cottbus	Rainer Knaak, Wolfgang Uhlmann
33	1984	Eilenburg	Rainer Knaak
34	1985	Jüterbog	Wolfgang Uhlmann
35	1986	Nordhausen	Wolfgang Uhlmann
36	1987	Glauchau	Raj Tischbierek
37	1988	Stralsund	Lutz Espig, Thomas Pähtz
38	1989	Zittau	Hans-Ulrich Grünberg
39	1990	Bad Blankenburg	Raj Tischbierek, Thomas Pähtz

== German championships since 1991 ==
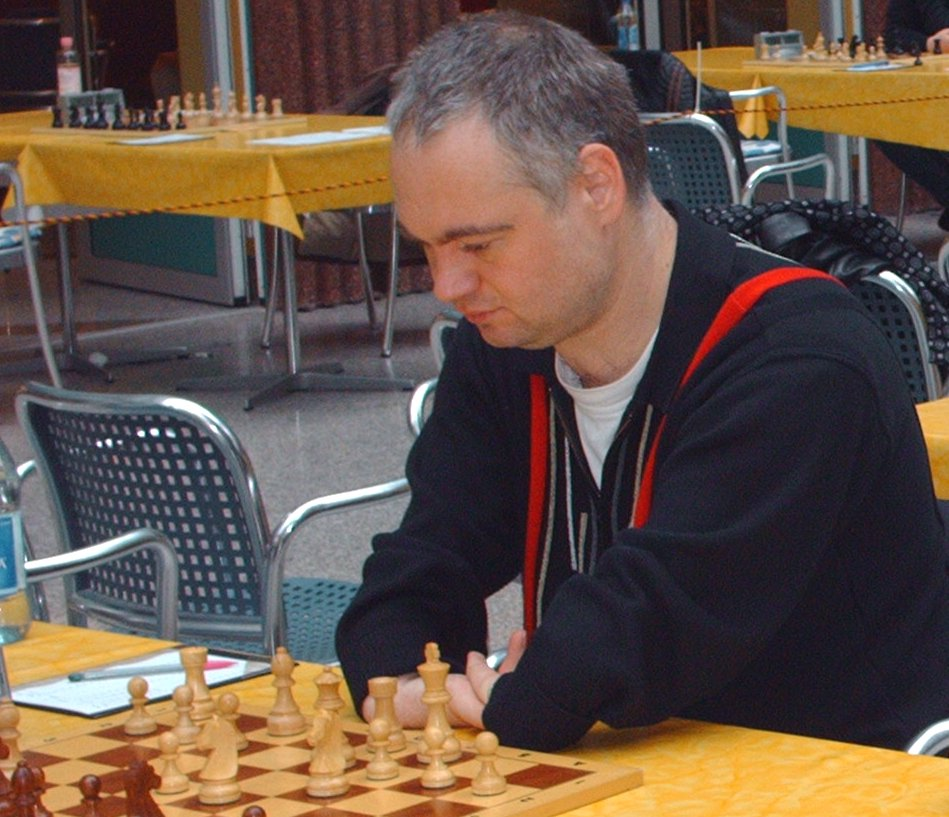
Thomas Luther

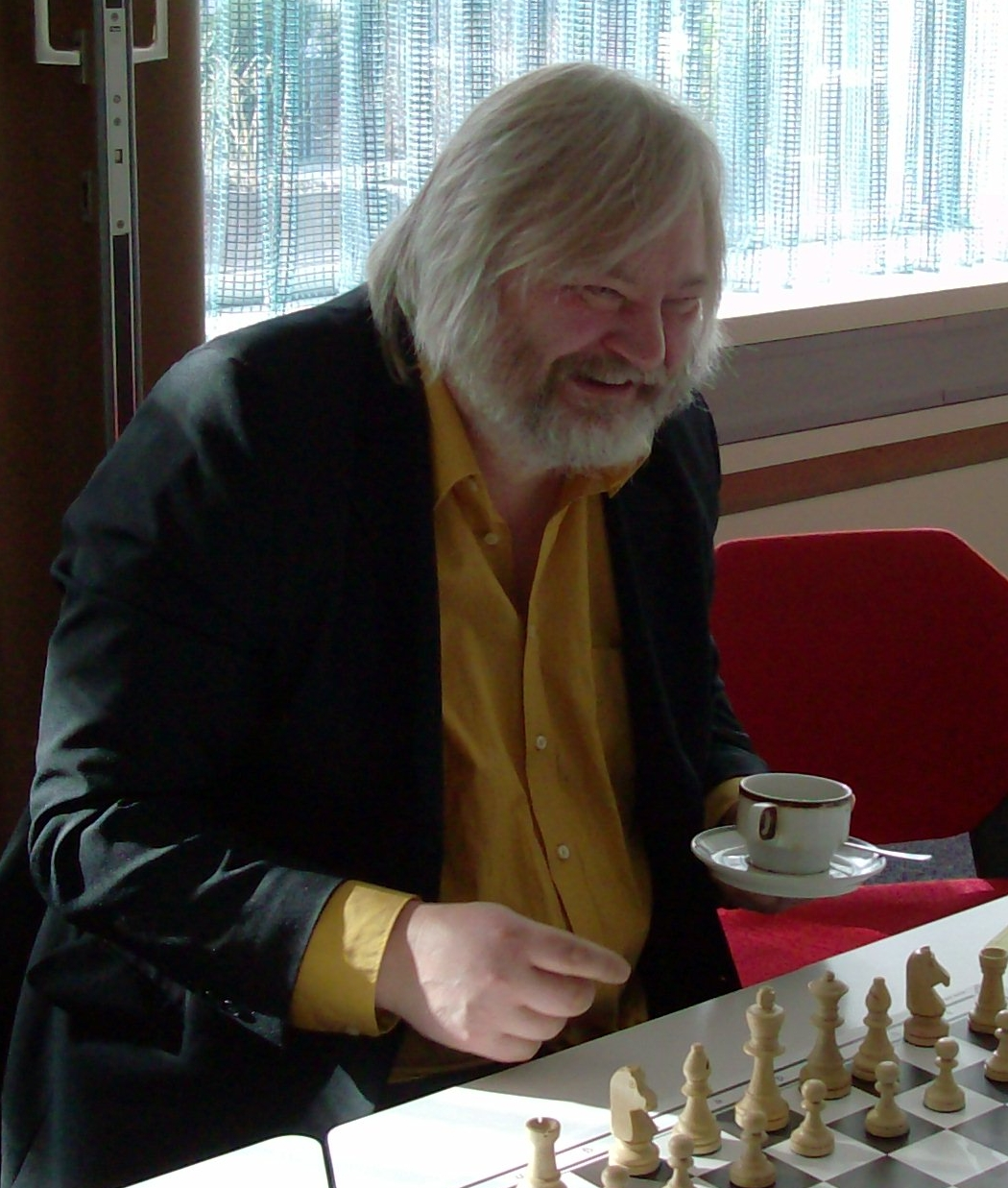
Artur Yusupov

#	Year	City	Winner
1	1991	Bad Neuenahr	Vlastimil Hort
2	1993	Bad Wildbad	Thomas Luther, Thomas Pähtz
3	1994	Binz	Peter Enders
4	1995	Binz	Christopher Lutz
5	1996	Dudweiler	Matthias Wahls
6	1996	Nussloch	Rustem Dautov, Artur Yusupov
7	1997	Gladenbach	Matthias Wahls
8	1998	Bremen	Jörg Hickl
9	1999	Altenkirchen	Robert Hübner
10	2000	Heringsdorf	Robert Rabiega
11	2001	Altenkirchen	Christopher Lutz
12	2002	Saarbrücken	Thomas Luther
13	2004	Höckendorf	Alexander Graf
14	2005	Altenkirchen	Artur Yusupov
15	2006	Osterburg	Thomas Luther
16	2007	Bad Königshofen	Arkadij Naiditsch
17	2008	Bad Wörishofen	Daniel Fridman
18	2009	Saarbrücken	Arik Braun
19	2010	Bad Liebenzell	Niclas Huschenbeth
20	2011	Bonn	Igor Khenkin
21	2012	Osterburg	Daniel Fridman
22	2013	Saarbrücken	Klaus Bischoff
23	2014	Verden an der Aller	Daniel Fridman
24	2015	Saarbrücken	Klaus Bischoff
25	2016	Lübeck	Sergey Kalinitschew
26	2017	Apolda	Liviu-Dieter Nisipeanu
27	2018	Dresden	Rainer Buhmann
28	2019	Magdeburg	Niclas Huschenbeth
29	2020	Magdeburg	Matthias Blübaum
30	2021	Magdeburg	Jonas Rosner
31	2022	Magdeburg	Leonardo Costa
32	2023	Ostfildern	Vitaly Kunin
33	2024	Ostfildern	Dmitrij Kollars
34	2025	Munich	Vincent Keymer
35	2026	Dresden	Leonardo Costa

== Women ==
=== Congress of the German Chess Federation, 1927 ===
Year	City	Winner
1927	Magdeburg	Mittelmann

=== Championships of the Greater German Chess Federation, 1939–1943 ===
Year	City	Winner
1939	Stuttgart	Friedl Rinder
1942	Bad Oeynhausen	Edith Keller
1943	Vienna	Gertrud Jürgens

=== All-German championships, 1947–1953 ===
Year	City	Winner
1947	Seesen	Edith Keller
1949	Munich	Friedl Rinder
1951	Bad Klosterlausnitz	Edith Keller
1952	Schwerin	Edith Keller-Herrmann
1953	Waldkirch	Edith Keller-Herrmann

=== Championships of West Germany, 1953–1989 ===
Year	City	Winner
1955	Krefeld	Friedl Rinder
1956	Wolfratshausen	Friedl Rinder
1957	Lindau	Helga Axt
1958	Gießen	Helga Axt
1959	Dahn	Friedl Rinder
1960	Büdingen	Maria Scheffold
1961	Wennigsen	Helga Axt
1962	Eckernförde	Anneliese Brandler
1963	Krefeld	Hannelore Lucht
1964	Bremen	Irmgard Kärner
1965	Wangen im Allgäu	Ottilie Stibaner
1968	Fürstenfeldbruck	Ursula Wasnetsky
1970	Lauterbach	Anni Laakmann
1972	Burg	Anni Laakmann
1974	Kassel	Anni Laakmann
1976	Brilon	Anni Laakmann
1978	Delecke	Barbara Hund
1980	Schwäbisch Gmünd	Isabel Hund
1982	Porz	Barbara Hund
1984	Bad Aibling	Barbara Hund
1987	Bad Lauterberg	Ute Späte
1989	Bad Aibling	Isabel Hund

=== Open German Women's Championships since 1971 ===
Year	City	Winner
1971	Zell am Harmersbach	Gertrud Renz
1973	Bad Aibling	Doina Pfleger
1975	Zell am Harmersbach	Ursula Wasnetsky
1977	Weißenhäuser Strand	Maria Kuch
1979	Wittlich	Christel Neumark
1981	Brilon	Annette Borik
1983	Porz	Raissa Wapnitschnaja
1986	Zell am Harmersbach	Annette Borik
1988	Braunfels	Rita Kas-Fromm
1990	Bad Neustadt	Jordanka Mičić
1992	Bad Neustadt	Marina Olbrich
1994	Wuppertal	Ekaterina Borulya
1996	Dresden	Anita Just
1998	Weimar	Gundula David
2000	Rodewisch	Tatjana Vasilevich
2002	Bad Brückenau	Heike Vogel
2004	Osterburg (Altmark)	Sandra Krege
2006	Bad Königshofen	Petra Blažková
2008	Kerkwitz	Antje Fuchs
2010	Gladenbach	Heike Vogel
2012	Gladenbach	Antje Fuchs

=== International Open German Women's Championships since 1977 ===
Year	City	Winner
1977	Bad Kissingen	Marta Litinskaya
1979	Bad Kissingen	Maia Chiburdanidze
1981	Bad Kissingen	Nino Gurieli
2014	Erfurt	Christina Winterholler
2015	Bayerisch Eisenstein	Jutta Ries
2016	Bodenmais	Melanie Grund

=== Championships of the Soviet occupation zone, 1948–1949 ===
Year	City	Winner
1948	Bad Doberan	Gertrud Nüsken
1949	Bad Klosterlausnitz	Mira Kremer

=== Championships of the GDR, 1950–1990 ===
Year	City	Winner
1950	Sömmerda	Edith Keller, Gertrud Nüsken
1951	Schwerin	Mira Kremer
1952	Schwerin	Edith Keller-Herrmann
1953	Weißenfels	Gertrud Nüsken
1954	Bad Saarow	Ursula Höroldt
1955	Zwickau	Gertrud Nüsken
1956	Leipzig	Edith Keller-Herrmann
1957	Sömmerda	Edith Keller-Herrmann
1958	Schkopau	Waltraud Schameitat
1959	Leipzig	Edith Keller-Herrmann
1961	Premnitz	Waltraud Schameitat
1962	Gera	Waltraud Schameitat
1963	Aschersleben	Waltraud Nowarra
1964	Magdeburg	Gabriele Ortlepp
1965	Annaberg-Buchholz	Gabriele Just
1967	Colditz	Waltraud Nowarra, Ursula Liebert
1968	Weimar	Waltraud Nowarra
1969	Schwerin	Waltraud Nowarra
1970	Freiberg	Christina Hölzlein
1971	Strausberg	Christina Hölzlein
1972	Görlitz	Gabriele Just
1973	Erfurt	Eveline Nünchert
1974	Potsdam	Petra Feustel
1975	Stralsund	Brigitte Hofmann
1976	Gröditz	Petra Feustel
1977	Frankfurt (Oder)	Petra Feustel
1978	Torgelow	Brigitte Hofmann
1979	Suhl	Brigitte Hofmann
1980	Plauen	Ulricke Seidemann
1981	Fürstenwalde	Annett Wagner-Michel
1982	Salzwedel	Iris Bröder
1983	Cottbus	Annett Wagner-Michel
1984	Eilenburg	Iris Bröder
1985	Jüterbog	Marion Heintze
1986	Nordhausen	Carola Manger
1987	Glauchau	Iris Bröder
1988	Stralsund	Antje Riedel
1989	Zittau	Kerstin Kunze
1990	Bad Blankenburg	Gundula Nehse

=== German championships since 1991 ===
The German Women's Championship is held every odd-numbered year as a 9-round Swiss tournament (DFEM). In even-numbered years an international open tournament is held (IODFEM).

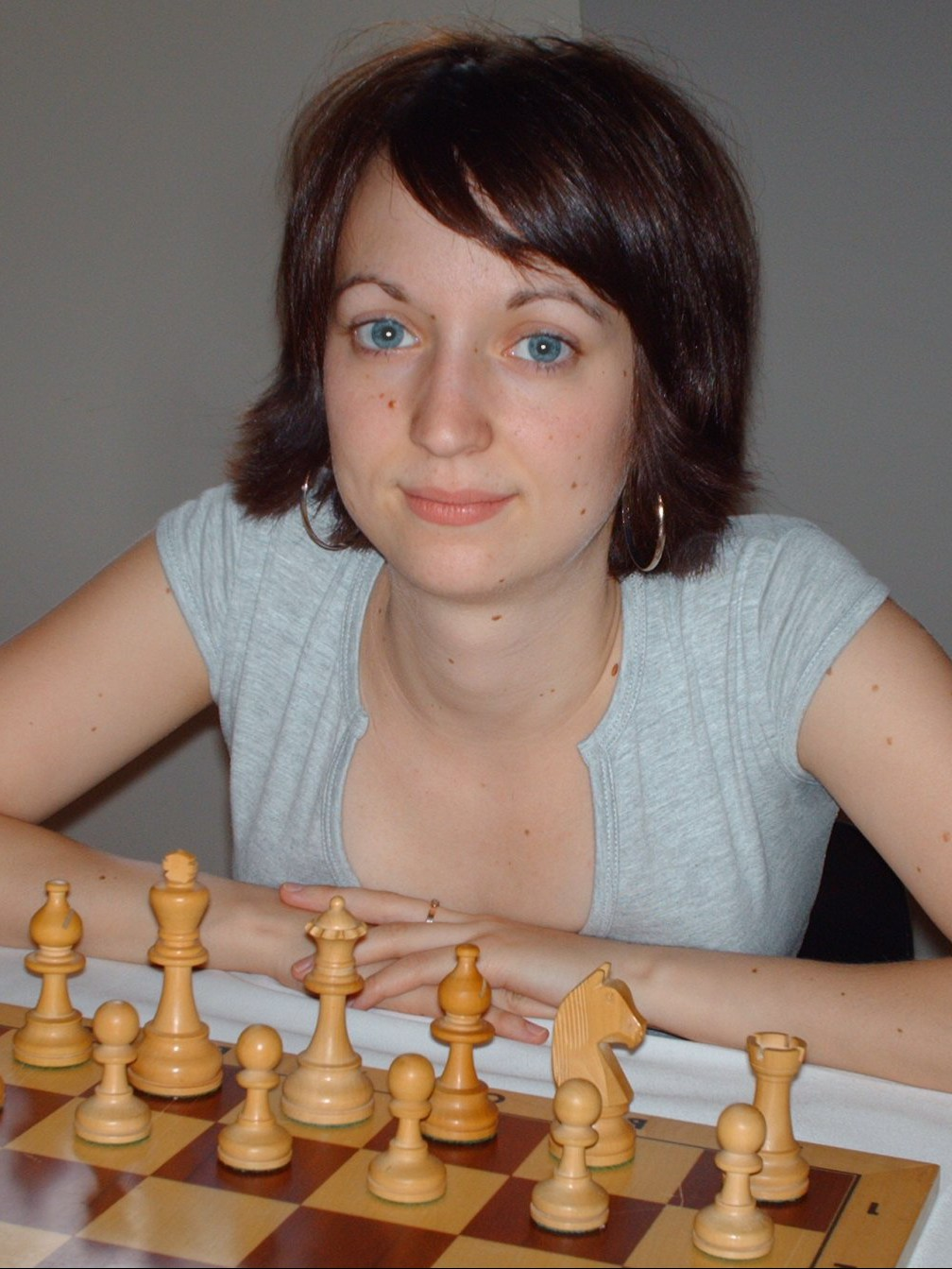
Elisabeth Pähtz

Year	City	Winner
1991	Beverungen	Anke Koglin
1993	Bad Mergentheim	Marina Olbrich
1995	Krefeld	Tatiana Grabuzova
1997	Ottweiler	Marina Olbrich
1999	Chemnitz	Elisabeth Pähtz
2001	Krefeld	Jessica Nill
2003	Altenkirchen	Annemarie Sylvia Meier
2005	Bad Königshofen	Sandra Krege
2007	Osterburg	Ljubov Kopylov
2009	Hockenheim	Polina Zilberman
2011	Bonn	Sarah Hoolt
2013	Bad Wiessee	Hanna Marie Klek
2015	Bad Wiessee	Zoya Schleining
2017	Bad Wiessee	Jana Schneider
2019	Magdeburg	Marta Michna
2020	Magdeburg	Carmen Voicu-Jagodzinsky
2021	Magdeburg	Elena Köpke
2022	Magdeburg	Lara Schulze
2023	Ostfildern	Kateryna Dolzhykova
2024	Ostfildern	Fiona Sieber
2025	Munich	Dinara Wagner
2026	Dresden	Jana Schneider
