= Ute Späte =

German chess player (born 1961)

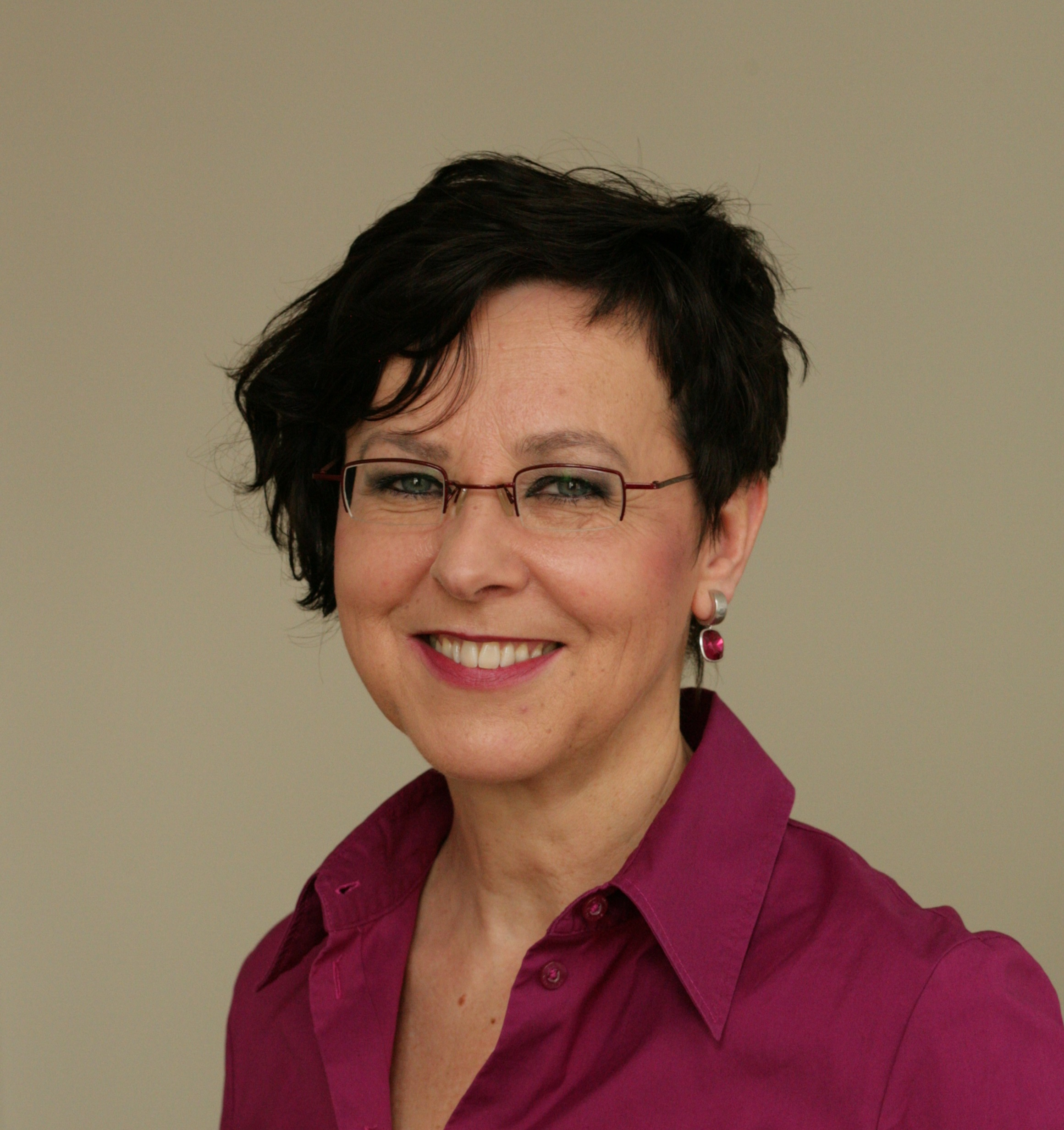
- Ute Späte in 2017

Personal information
- Born: 17 November 1961 (age 64)

Chess career
- Country: Germany
- Peak rating: 2090 (January 1988)

Ute Späte (born 17 November 1961) is a German chess player who won West Germany Women's Chess Championship (1987).

== Chess career ==
Together with the girls from North Rhine-Westphalia, Ute Späte won the German state championships for girls in 1978 in Schwäbisch Gmünd and 1979 in Dernau.

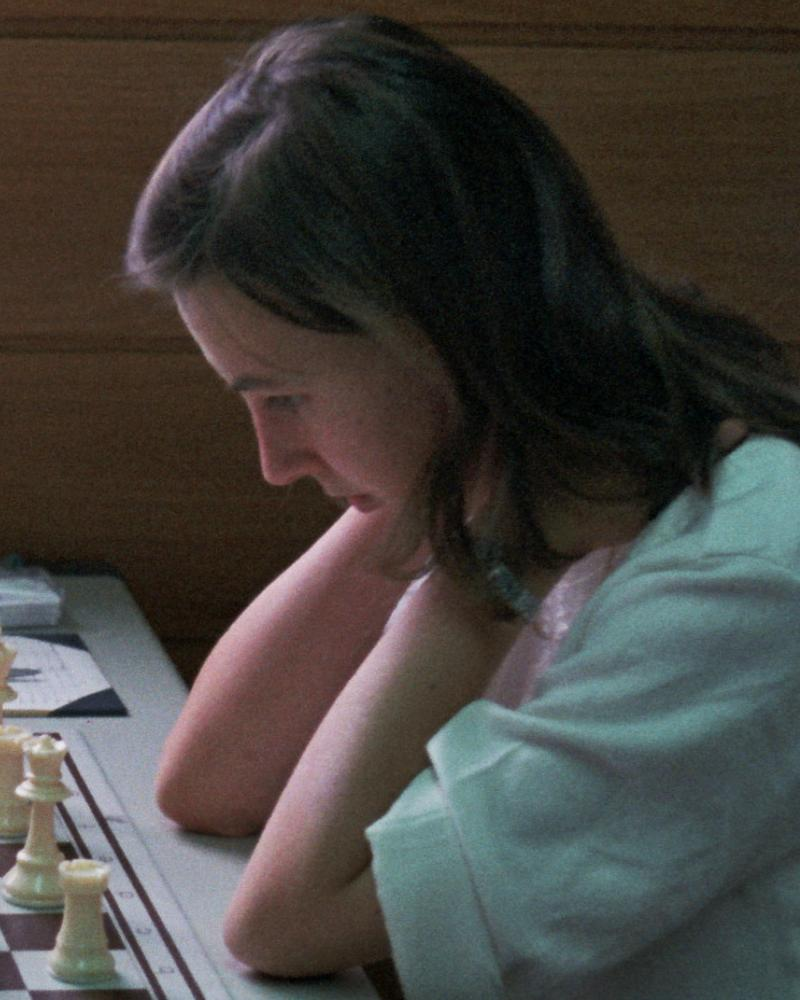
Ute Späte in her first West Germany Women's Chess Championship in 1984

At the eighth German championship for girls in 1981 in Bitburg she took 4th place.

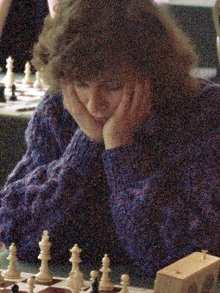
Ute Späte in her winner West Germany Women's Chess Championship in 1987

In Bad Oeynhausen 1984 she became Women's Chess Champion of North Rhine-Westphalia.

In 1984 she took part in the West Germany Women's Chess Championship, which Barbara Hund won, in Bad Aibling and finished 10th.

Three years later, Ute Späte won the West Germany Women's Chess Championship in 1987 in Bad Lauterberg ahead of Anja Dahlgrün.

At the end of the 1980s, Späte played for SC Kreuzberg, for whom she also played as a substitute in the season 1987/88 in the 1. Chess Women's Bundesliga was reported, but remained without action. She won the Berlin Women's Chess Championship in 1989.
