= Ulricke Seidemann =

German chess player

Personal information
- Born: 17 June 1955 (age 71) Potsdam, East Germany

Chess career
- Country: Germany
- Title: Women FIDE Master (1993)
- Peak rating: 2125 (January 1992)

Ulricke Seidemann (born 17 June 1955) is a German chess Women FIDE Master (1993) who won East Germany Women's Chess Championship (1980).

== Life ==
Ulricke Seidemann learned to play chess at the age of eleven. She studied in Greiz at the technical school for grain processing. Before winning the East Germany Women's Chess Championship in 1980, she took a break from tournaments because of birth her son Alexander. Today she is trained mechanical engineer, who kept her birth name, lives with her husband in Neuss and ran a coffee roastery, which has since been closed.

== Chess ==
=== Individual Championships ===
She took part in the following East Germany Women's Chess Championship: 1974 in Potsdam, 1975 in Stralsund, 1976 in Gröditz, 1977 in Frankfurt (Oder), 1980 in Plauen, 1981 in Fürstenwalde, 1983 in Cottbus, 1984 in Eilenburg, 1985 in Jüterbog and 1988 in Stralsund. The championships before 1980 were won by Petra Feustel (1974, 1976, 1977) and Brigitte Hofmann (1975, 1978, 1979). After the Peaceful Revolution, she shared 4th place at the German Women's Chess Championship in 1991 in Beverungen, which Anke Koglin won. In 1992 she took part in the 11th Open German Women's Chess Championship in Bad Neustadt an der Saale, which Marina Olbrich won.

=== Team competition ===
In the 1st Women's Chess Bundesliga, Seidemann played in the season 1992/93 for USV Potsdam and from 1994 to 2000 for the Krefeld Chess Club Turm 1851. In 1974 and 1975 she won the East Germany Women's Team Blitz Chess Championship together with the Potsdam women team.

=== Miscellaneous ===
Seidemann's Elo rating is 2043 (as of December 2021), but she is listed as inactive because she has not played an Elo-rated game since the 2017/18 season of the 2nd Frauenbundesliga West. She had her highest Elo rating of 2125 in January 1992.
