= Rudolf Elstner =

German chess player

Personal information
- Born: 13 October 1893 Bohemia
- Died: 12 August 1966 (aged 72) Berlin, Germany

Chess career
- Country: Germany

Rudolf Elstner (13 October 1893 – 12 August 1966) was a German chess player who won East Germany Chess Championship (1950).

== Chess career ==
Between 1920 and 1960, Rudolf Elstner was one of the strongest chess masters in Berlin. However, he never managed to win the Berlin City Chess Championship. His greatest success was a 3rd place behind Kurt Richter and Ludwig Rellstab in 1936, whereby he was the only one who defeated the winner Richter.

On July 19 and 20, 1930, he played two show games with people figure against José Raúl Capablanca, who was in Berlin for a three-day stay, in the Luna Park in Berlin. Both games were broken off in the middle game in a critical position.

Elstner was originally belt master by profession, but made chess his purpose in life. Before the Second World War he was head of the chess room in the café Moka Efti. Even after the war he remained true to this task and ran the chess café at Yorckstraße 80 in Berlin. The café was open every day except Wednesday.

The years immediately after the Second World War were Elstner's most successful period, while he had already won the Strength Through Joy district championship in 1940. In 1947 he finished fourth in the Berlin Chess Championship, followed in the same year by a third place in the Soviet occupation zone of Germany Chess Championship. In 1950 he made the big leap: in Sömmerda he won the first East Germany Chess Championship ahead Wolfgang Pietzsch.

Elstner often changed his place of residence in Berlin and played for various clubs. In 1947 he became Berlin Blitzmeister with the chess group Friedenau: Friedenauer Chess Society. Until the beginning of the 1960s he played for the chess group of the BSG unit Pankow in East Berlin. At the same time he had been a member of the Schach-Club Kreuzberg in West Berlin since 1950, where he also lived. The German Chess Association of the East Germany warned him several times because of these border crossings. On May 22, 1959, the East Germany Chess Federation Presidium decided to ban Elstner from April 1, 1959, to March 31, 1960. He remained loyal to the Kreuzberg club until his death and received honorary membership there.

== Books ==
- Wir bitten zum Schachbrett (We ask for the chessboard) Caissa-Verlag, Weidenau 1949 (together with Hans-Werner von Massow).
