= Anni Laakmann =

German chess player (1937–2025)

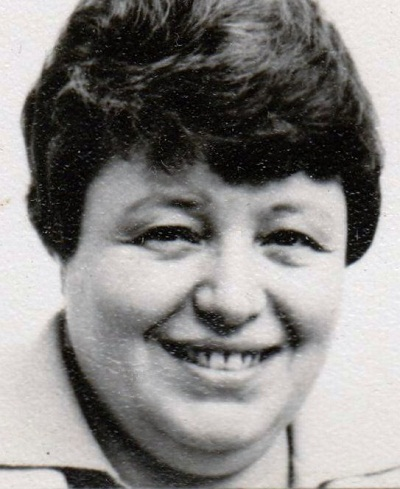
- Laakmann in 1978

Personal information
- Born: 5 January 1937 Rheinberg, Germany
- Died: 18 September 2025 (aged 88)

Chess career
- Country: Germany
- Title: Woman FIDE Master (1983)
- Peak rating: 2185 (January 1987)

Anni Laakmann (5 January 1937 – 18 September 2025) was a German chess player who held the title of Woman FIDE Master (WFM, 1983). She is a four time West Germany Women's Chess Champion (1970, 1972, 1974, 1976).

== Biography ==
In 1970s, Laakmann was one of West Germany's leading women chess players. She won the West Germany Women's Chess Championships four times in 1970, 1972, 1974 and 1976. In 1973, in Nordic Chess Cup Laakmann won all her games. In 1975, in Pula she participated in the World Women's Chess Championship Zonal tournament.

Anni Laakmann played for Germany in the Women's Chess Olympiads:

- In 1972, at first board in the 5th Chess Olympiad (women) in Skopje (+3, =4, -3),
- In 1974, at first board in the 6th Chess Olympiad (women) in Medellín (+4, =4, -5),
- In 1976, at first board in the 7th Chess Olympiad (women) in Haifa (+4, =4, -2),
- In 1978, at first board in the 8th Chess Olympiad (women) in Buenos Aires (+2, =5, -4) and won the team bronze medal,
- In 1980, at third board in the 9th Chess Olympiad (women) in Valletta (+4, =3, -2),
- In 1982, at first reserve board in the 10th Chess Olympiad (women) in Lucerne (+2, =1, -2).

In mid 1980s Laakmann finished her chess player career.
