= Anja Hegeler =

German chess player (1965–2022)

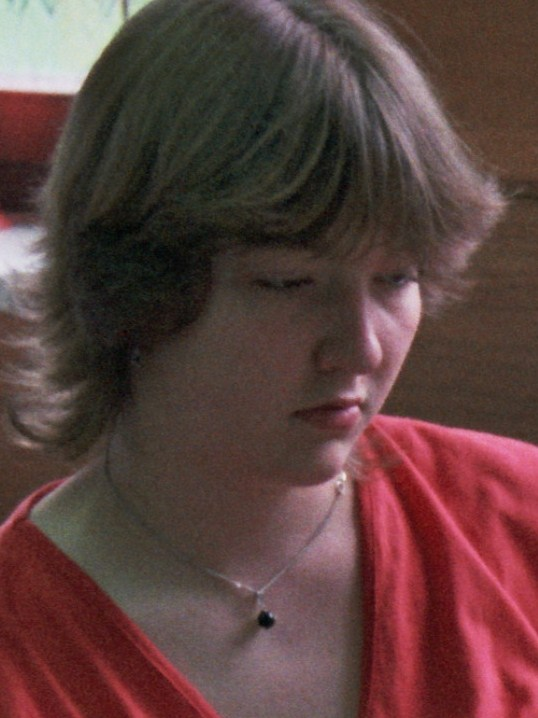
- Anja Hegeler in 1984

Personal information
- Born: 7 November 1965 Hamburg, Germany
- Died: 24 December 2022 (aged 57) Hamburg, Germany

Chess career
- Country: Germany
- Title: Woman International Master (1988)
- Peak rating: 2275 (January 1990)

Anja Hegeler (née Dahlgrün, married Ehrke; 7 November 1965 – 24 December 2022) was a German chess Woman International Master (WIM, 1988), West Germany Women's Chess Championship silver medalist (1987).

== Chess career ==
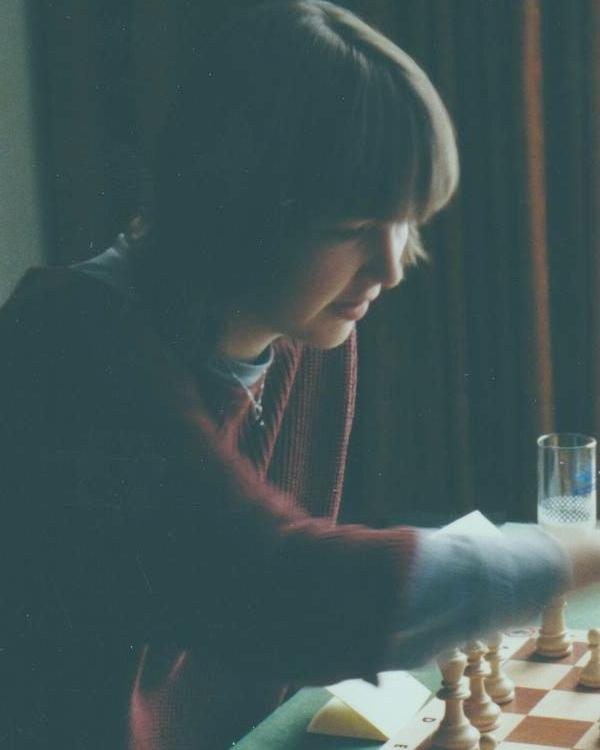
Anja Dahlgrün in FIDE Zonal tournament 1985 in Bad Lauterberg

Anja twice won the West Germany Girl's Chess Championship. In 1983 in Hanau she was first ahead of Bettina Trabert. In 1984 in Odenthal-Eikamp she won the West Germany Girl's Chess Championship for the second time.

In 1984 in Bad Aibling she took part in a West Germany Women's Chess Championship for the first time and finished sixth. At the West Germany Women's Blitz Chess Championship in 1986 in Hameln, she was third behind Gisela Fischdick and Isabel Hund. In 1987 in Bad Lauterberg she took second place in the West Germany Women's Chess Championship. In 1999 in Essen she came third at the West Germany Women's Blitz Chess Championship behind Gisela Fischdick and Jessica Nill. In 2002 in Barnstorf at the West Germany Women's Rapid Chess Championship, she came third behind Gisela Fischdick and Vera Jürgens.

She reached 12th place in the European Junior Chess Championship in U20 age group in 1984. At the FIDE Women's World Chess Championship Zonal tournament in Bad Lauterberg in 1985, she took fourth place behind Helene Mira. She also qualified for the zone tournament in Erlangen 1987. At the 28th Chess Olympiad in 1988 in Thessaloniki she played for the West Germany Women's Team; there she reached 6 points from 11 games. Her greatest achievement was 3rd place with 7.5 points from 11 games at the FIDE Women's World Chess Championship Zonal tournament in Haifa in 1989.

Anja Hegeler held the title Woman International Master (WIM). She was a member of the Hamburger SK 1830 and played with them from 1991 to 1995 and again since 1997 in the Women's Chess Bundesliga.

Her father Harro Dahlgrün (1918–1995) was a founding member of the rugby, basketball and chess departments of Hamburger SV and from 1971 its honorary member, longtime managing director of the Hamburger Sportbund and wrote a four-volume work on the King's Gambit.

Anja Hegeler died on Christmas Eve 2022 after a long and serious illness.
