= Eckhard Schmittdiel =

German chess grandmaster (born 1960)

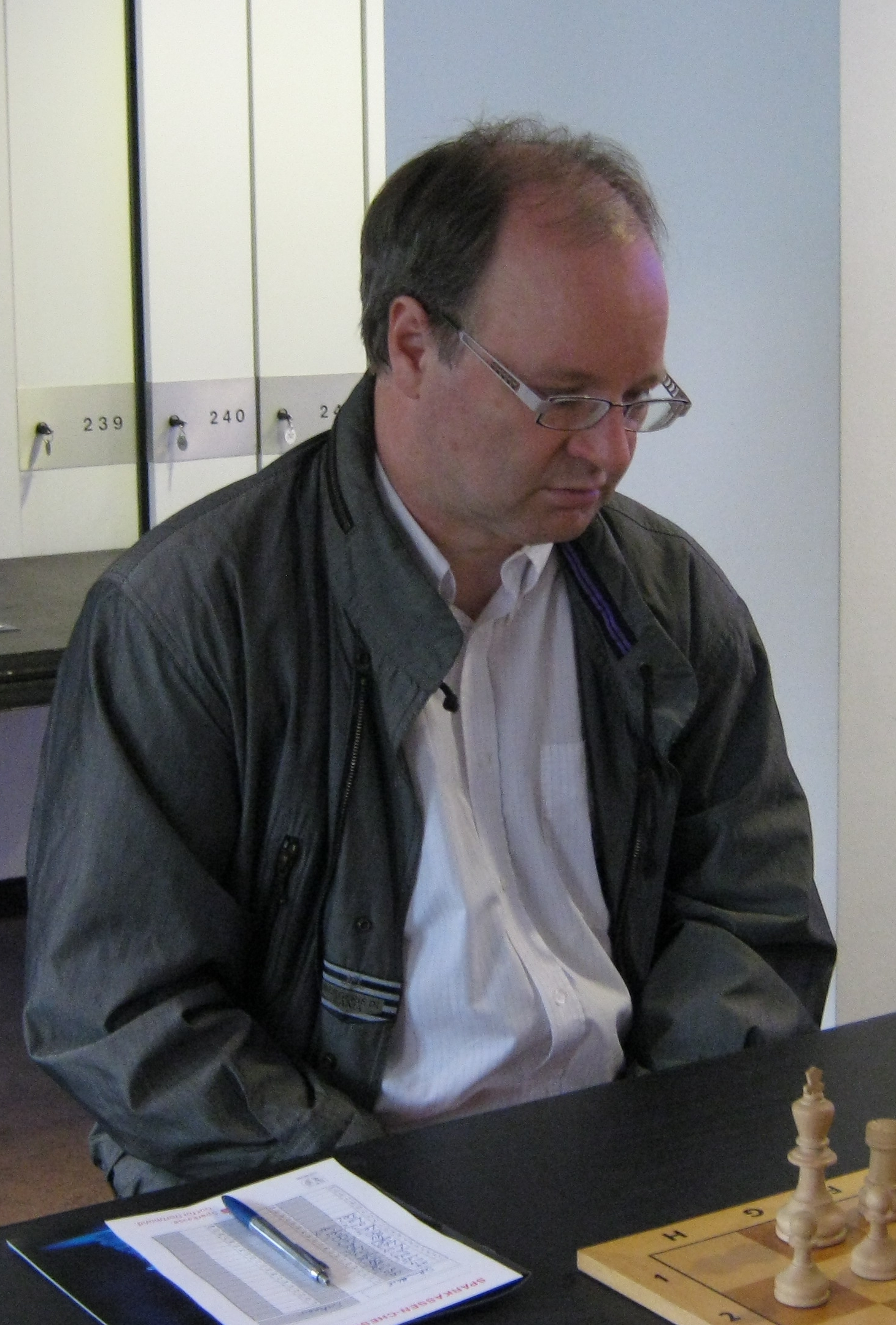
- Eckhard Schmittdiel in 2011

Personal information
- Born: 13 May 1960 (age 66) Dortmund, Germany

Chess career
- Country: Germany
- Title: Grandmaster (1994)
- Peak rating: 2505 (July 1990)

Eckhard Schmittdiel (born 13 May 1960) is a German chess Grandmaster (GM, 1994) who shared 1st place in West Germany Chess Championship (1989).

== Biography ==
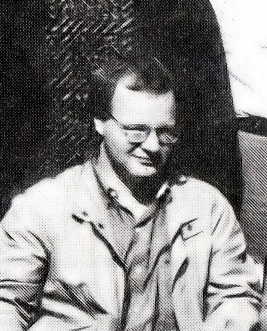
Eckhard Schmittdiel in 1991

Eckhard Schmittdiel only joined a chess club at the age of 15. He had his first major success in 1984 when he won the Dähne Cup chess tournament. In 1986 he became the North Rhine-Westphalia chess champion. In 1987/88 he won in Augsburg. In 1989 he was at the top of the West Germany Chess Championship in Bad Neuenahr with the same number of points as Vlastimil Hort. The tie-break ended in a draw, so that Hort became champion thanks to the better rating. In 1990 he finished first in Prague together with Romuald Mainka. In 1994 he won in Gausdal, in 1999 and 2000 at the master tournament in Dortmund.

In 1988, he was awarded the FIDE International Master (IM) title and received the FIDE Grandmaster (GM) title six years later.

Most recently, Schmittdiel won the Open chess tournament in Crailsheim in 2009 and the Filderpokal rapid chess tournament in 2010.

Since the Chess Bundesliga season 1989/90 Schmittdiel has played in the German Chess Bundesliga and the 2nd Chess Bundesliga. There he played for the clubs SF Dortmund-Brackel, SG Porz, SV Tübingen 1870, SG Bochum 31, TV Tegernsee, Stuttgarter Schachfreunde, SC Hansa Dortmund and BCA Augsburg.

In addition, he was also active at times in the Austrian Chess Bundesliga for SK Absam.

== Chess tournament wins ==
- Dähne-Pokal 1984
- North Rhine-Westphalia chess championship 1986
- Bad Neuenahr 1989 (tied with Vlastimil Hort)
- Int. Baunataler Open 1998
- Crailsheimer Open 1998
- Master Chess Tournament Dortmund 1999
- Master Chess Tournament Dortmund 2000
- Tübinger Master Chess Tournament 2001
- Filderpokal 2002
- Int. Open Avoine 2006
- Filderpokal 2007
- Velden Open 2008
- Crailsheimer Open 2009
- Filderpokal 2010
- Dortmund city chess championship 1983 und 2013

== Works ==
along with Jerzy Konikowski: Modern Benoni - played right, Beyer, Hollfeld 1989 ISBN 3-89168-016-3.
