= Christina Lehmann =

German chess player (born 1951)

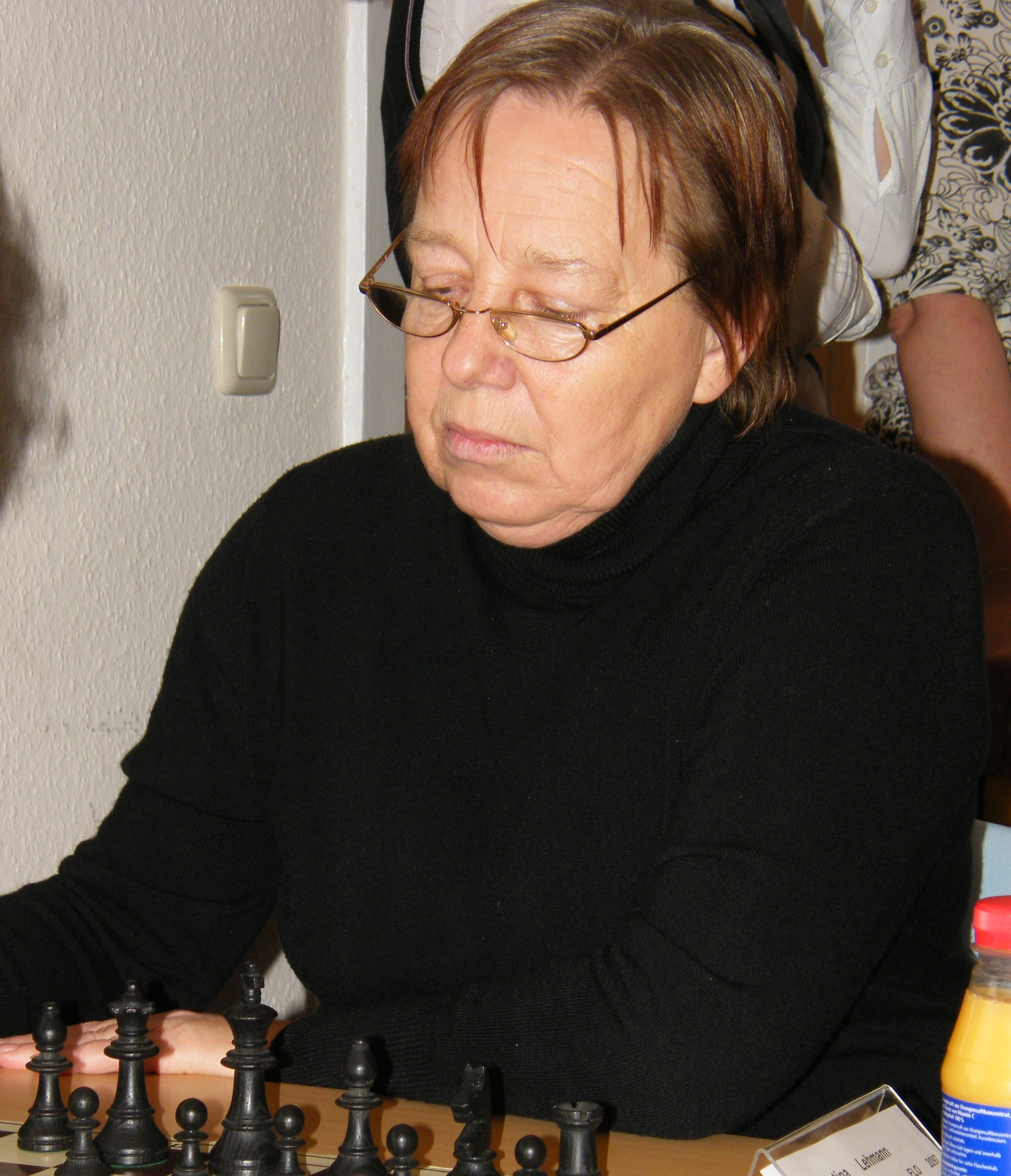
- Christina Lehmann in 2008

Personal information
- Born: 9 December 1951 (age 74)

Chess career
- Country: East Germany; Germany
- Peak rating: 2180 (July 1994)

Christina Lehmann (born 9 December 1951), née Hölzlein, from 1975 to 2005 Domsgen, is a German chess player. She is a two-time winner of the East Germany Women's Chess Championship (1970, 1971).

== Chess career ==
In the 1970s Christina Lehmann was one of the leading East German chess players. She won the East Germany Women's Chess Championships two times in row: 1970, 1971. Also she won silver (1973) and two bronze medals (1974, 1975) in this tournament.

She played for East Germany in the Women's Chess Olympiad:

- In 1972, at first reserve board in the 5th Chess Olympiad (women) in Skopje (+1, =2, −3).

Until 1973 Christina Lehmann played for BSG Chemie Lützkendorf. With the BSG Buna Halle, she was East Germany team champion in blitz chess in 1973. She won this title again in 1975 with the HSG PH Potsdam. In 2008 she won the championship again with the SK Großlehna. In the 1990s, she played for the women's team of SV Buna Schkopau and generally play operation until 2004 for the ESV Merseburg (later SV Merseburg). She has been playing in the women's Chess Bundesliga since the 2003/04 season for the SK Großlehna, with the greatest success being the runner-up right after the promotion in the 2007/08 season.
