= Bernd Schneider (chess player) =

German chess player (born 1965)

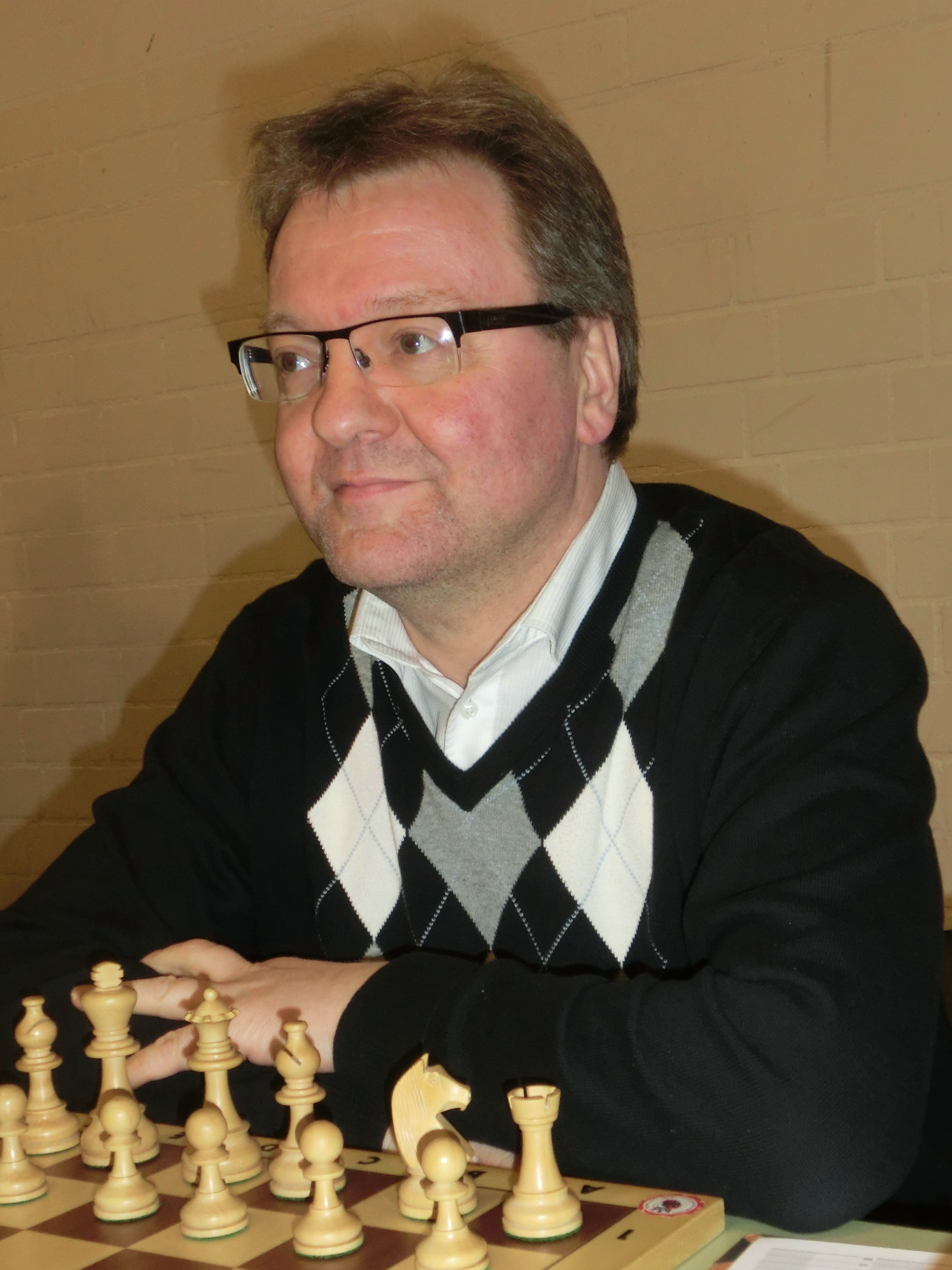
- Bernd Schneider in 2015

Personal information
- Born: 10 April 1965 (age 61) Solingen, Germany

Chess career
- Country: Germany
- Title: International Master (1986)
- Peak rating: 2475 (July 1989)

Bernd Schneider (born 10 April 1965) is a German chess International Master (IM, 1986) who won West Germany Chess Championship (1988).

== Biography ==
Bernd Schneider played in the Chess Bundesliga in season 1985/86 with the PSV/BSV Wuppertal and several years with the Schachgesellschaft Solingen in the Chess Bundesliga. With Solingen he became Chess Bundesliga champion in 1987, 1988 and 1997 and won the European Chess Club Cup in 1990. In Belgium, Schneider plays for KSK Rochade Eupen-Kelmis, with whom he took part in the European Chess Club Cup three times.

In 1987 he won the Chess Mitropa Cup in Mürren with the German national team. In 1988 in Bad Lauterberg Bernd Schneider won West Germany Chess Championship.

The SG 1868-Alekhine Solingen won with Joël Lautier, Jeroen Piket, Predrag Nikolić, Markus Schäfer and Bernd Schneider at the German Blitz Chess Team Championship in June 2002 in Solingen.

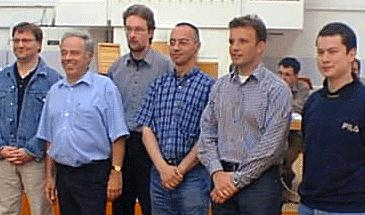
The Solingen team (2002), left Bernd Schneider, right Joël Lautier.

In 1986, he was awarded the FIDE International Master (IM) title.
