= Petra Sochorová =

Czech chess player (born 1978)

Personal information
- Born: 22 June 1978 (age 48)

Chess career
- Country: Czech Republic
- Title: Woman International Master (1999)
- Peak rating: 2276 (July 2005)

Petra Sochorová (née Blažková, born 22 June 1978) is a Czech chess player. She received the FIDE title of Woman International Master (WIM) in 1999. She is a five-time medalist of the Czech Women's Chess Championship (1998, 2001, 2003, 2005, 2012), Open German Women's Championship winner (2006).

== Biography ==
Petra Sochorová is a five-time winner of individual medals in the Czech Women's Chess Championships: two silver (2001, 2012) and three bronze (1998, 2003, 2005). Also she won silver (2005) and bronze (2004) medals at the Czech Women's Rapid Chess Championships. In 2004, Sochorová won Czech Women's Blitz Chess Championship. In 2006, in Bad Königshofen she won Open German Women's Championship.Sochorová played for Czech Republic in the Women's Chess Olympiads:

- In 2004, at first reserve board in the 36th Chess Olympiad (women) in Calvià (+4, =3, -3),
- In 2006, at first reserve board in the 37th Chess Olympiad (women) in Turin (+5, =3, -2).

She played for Czech Republic in the World Women's Team Chess Championship:\

- In 2007, at third board in the 3rd Women's World Team Chess Championship 2007 in Yekaterinburg (+2, =4, -3).

In 1999, Sochorová was awarded the FIDE Woman International Master (WIM) title.

== FIDE ratings ==
Elo development
View chart definition.
