= Hans Günther Kestler =

German chess player

Personal information
- Born: 12 December 1939 Bamberg, Germany
- Died: 1 September 2013 (aged 73)

Chess career
- Country: Germany
- Title: International Master (1976)
- Peak rating: 2450 (January 1976)

Hans Günther Kestler (12 December 1939 — 1 September 2013) was a German chess International Master (IM) (1976), West Germany Chess Championship winner (1972), European Team Chess Championship individual bronze medal winner (1965).

== Biography ==
From the mid-1960s to the late 1970s, Hans Günther Kestler was one of West Germany's leading chess players. In 1972, in Oberursel he won West Germany Chess Championship. In 1976, Hans Günther Kestler was awarded the FIDE International Master (IM) title.

Hans Günther Kestler played for West Germany in the Chess Olympiads:

- In 1972, at first reserve board in the 20th Chess Olympiad in Skopje (+9, =4, -2),
- In 1974, at second reserve board in the 21st Chess Olympiad in Nice (+8, =6, -1),
- In 1976, at third board in the 22nd Chess Olympiad in Haifa (+2, =4, -2).

Hans Günther Kestler played for West Germany in the European Team Chess Championships:

- In 1965, at seventh board in the 3rd European Team Chess Championship in Hamburg (+2, =7, -1) and won individual bronze medal,
- In 1977, at sixth board in the 6th European Team Chess Championship in Moscow (+0, =3, -3).

Hans Günther Kestler played for West Germany in the Clare Benedict Chess Cups:

- In 1966, at third board in the 13th Clare Benedict Chess Cup in Brunnen (+1, =1, -1) and won team bronze medal,
- In 1967, at reserve board in the 14th Clare Benedict Chess Cup in Leysin (+1, =2, -0) and won team and individual gold medals.
