= Marion Heintze =

German chess player (born 1954)

Personal information
- Born: 5 September 1954 (age 71)

Chess career
- Country: Germany
- Title: Woman International Master (1983)
- Peak rating: 2250 (July 1990)

Marion Heintze (née Worch; born 5 September 1954) is a German chess Woman International Master (1983) who won the East Germany Women's Chess Championship (1985).

== Chess career ==
In 1985 Heintze won the East Germany Women's Chess Championship held in Jüterbog, and she also won the East Germany Women's Blitz Championships in 1969, 1972, and 1976. At the Chess Olympiad 1990 in Novi Sad, Yugoslavia, she and the East Germany Women's team came 11th in the women's competition and, with 8 points from 11 games, achieved the fourth-best result on the third board.

After the German reunification Heintze was also the German Women's Chess Team Champion with the chess club SVg Lasker Steglitz in the German Women's Chess Bundesliga 1991/92. With a result of 9 points from 10 games, she was the most successful player on her team.

Marion Heintze has not played an Elo-rated game since 1992 and is therefore listed as inactive by FIDE.

In the early 1980s, she married the former President of the East Germany Chess Association Armin Heintze (born 1935).
