= Manfred Schöneberg =

German chess player (born 1946)

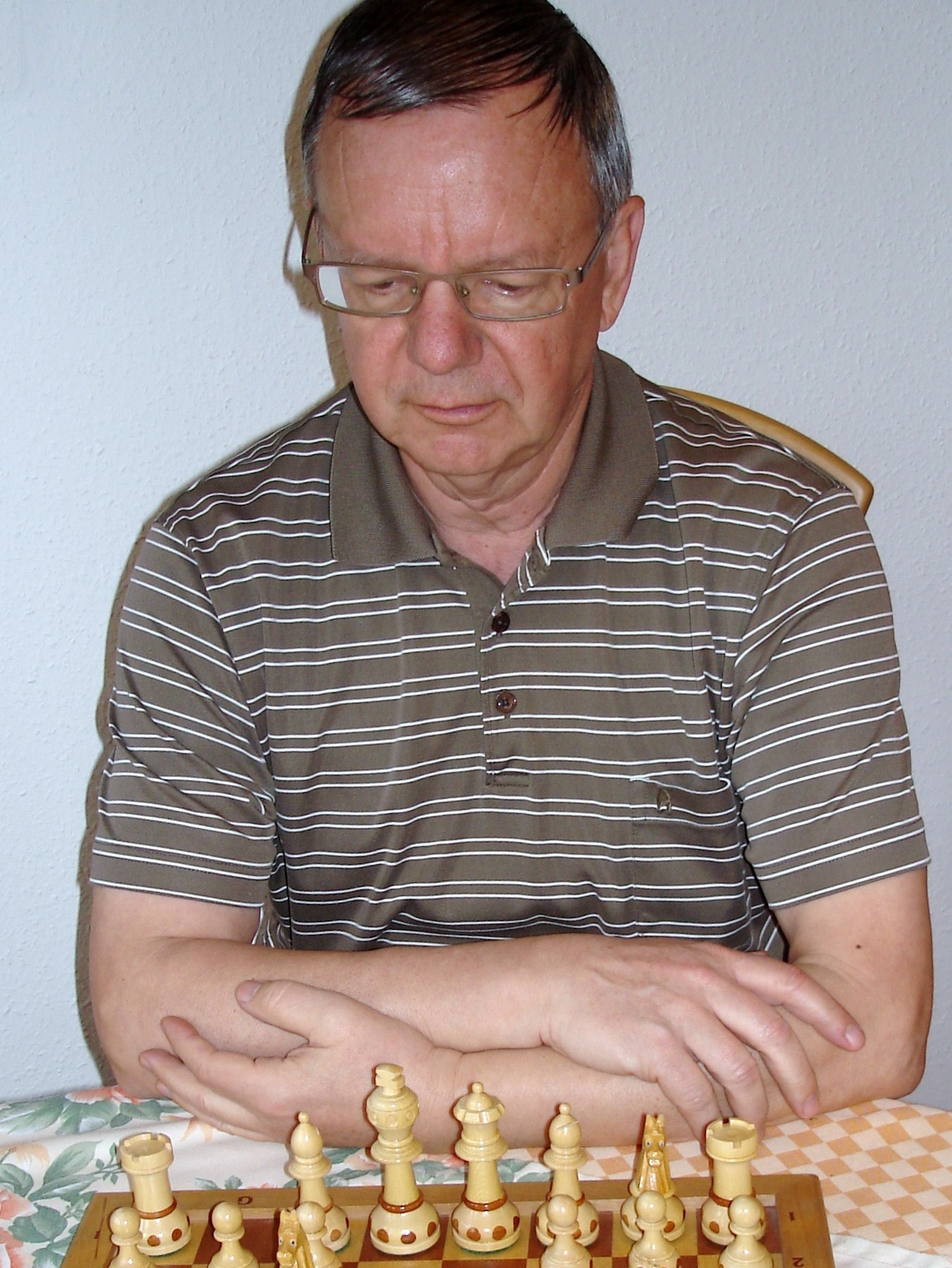
- Schöneberg in 2012

Personal information
- Born: 6 July 1946 (age 80) Leipzig, Germany

Chess career
- Country: Germany
- Title: FIDE Master (1987)
- Peak rating: 2470 (July 1972)

Manfred Schöneberg (born 6 July 1946) is a German chess FIDE Master (FM), East Germany Chess Championship winner (1972) and European Team Chess Championship team bronze and individual gold medal winner (1970).

== Biography ==
Manfred Schöneberg learned chess from his father at the age of seven. In 1961, he won the East Germany Children's Chess Championship. In 1964, Manfred Schöneberg won the East Germany Youth Chess Championship. In 1966, he won the East Germany Student Chess Championship. Manfred Schöneberg has been living in his hometown since his birth. He studied mathematics at Leipzig University from 1965 to 1970. From 1974 to 1979, Manfred Schöneberg completed a correspondence course in computer science at the Dresden College of Engineering, from which he graduated as an engineer. From 1970 on, Manfred Schöneberg worked as a computer scientist, the last ten years in the administration of Leipzig University. He has been married since 1968 and is a father of three. In 1972, in Görlitz, Manfred Schöneberg won the East Germany Chess Championship. In 1969 and 1972, he twice won the East Germany Blitz Chess Championship.

Manfred Schöneberg played for East Germany in the Chess Olympiad:

- In 1972, at the first reserve board in the 20th Chess Olympiad in Skopje (+4, =5, -4).

Manfred Schöneberg played for East Germany in the European Team Chess Championships:

- In 1970, at the first reserve board in the 4th European Team Chess Championship in Kapfenberg (+4, =2, -0), winning team bronze and individual gold medals.

Manfred Schöneberg played for East Germany in the World Student Team Chess Championships:

- In 1965, at the second reserve board in the 12th World Student Team Chess Championship in Sinaia (+0, =0, -2),
- In 1966, at the third board in the 13th World Student Team Chess Championship in Örebro (+2, =4, -4),
- In 1967, at the fourth board in the 14th World Student Team Chess Championship in Harrachov (+4, =6, -2),
- In 1968, at the first board in the 15th World Student Team Chess Championship in Ybbs (+1, =8, -4),
- In 1969, at the second board in the 16th World Student Team Chess Championship in Dresden (+5, =7, -1).
