= Hans Besser (chess player) =

German chess player (1935–2002)

Personal information
- Born: 4 February 1935 Meissen, Germany
- Died: 11 December 2002 (aged 67)

Chess career
- Country: Germany
- Title: FIDE Master (1983)
- Peak rating: 2460 (July 1971)

Hans Besser (4 February 1935 – 11 December 2002) was a German chess FIDE Master (FM) who won West Germany Chess Championship (1967).

== Biography ==
Hans Besser born in the East Germany, in the mid-1950s he moved to West Germany. He was one of the strongest chess players in West Germany in the 2nd half of the 1960s - early 1970s.

In 1967 in West Germany Chess Championship Hans Besser shared 1st-2nd places with Robert Hübner, additional match ended in a draw - 2:2.

With West German Chess Team Hans Besser participated in European Team Chess Championship in 1965, in Clare Benedict Cups in 1967 and 1970 where West Germany team in 1967 became the winner of the competition, and in 1970 won bronze, in Nordic Cup Chess Team Tournament in 1972, and a number of international matches.

In 1967 he represented West Germany in the FIDE World Chess Championship cycle (1966–1969) Zonal Tournament.
