= Helga Axt =

German chess player

Personal information
- Born: 27 August 1937 (age 88) Bad Ems, Germany

Chess career
- Country: Germany
- Title: Woman International Master (1961)

Helga Axt (born 27 August 1937) is a German chess Woman International Master (1961) who three times won West Germany Women's Chess Championship (1957, 1958, 1961).

== Life ==
Helga Axt grew up with her grandmother in Prague with her younger sister. She graduated from a hotel management school in Bad Gastein and was a good track and field athlete at the time.

From 1957 to 1961 she was one of the best chess players in the West Germany. She won the West Germany Women's Chess Championship in 1957, 1958 and 1961. She was a member of the Freiburg Chess Club and a club reserve player in the 1950s. After being a teacher in Ihringen in the mid-1960s, she gave up playing chess.

== West Germany Women's Chess Championships ==
- In 1957 she was first in Lindau ahead of Anneliese Brandler.
- In 1958 she was first in Giessen before the blind Hannelore Kübel.
- In 1959 she had an accident in Dahn when she wanted to climb the Jungfernsprung. Friedl Rinder became German Champion.
- In 1961 she was first in Wennigsen ahead of Gerda Rubin.
