= Manfred Christoph =

German chess player (1931–1994)

Personal information
- Born: 28 May 1931 Düsseldorf, Germany
- Died: 1994 (aged 62–63)

Chess career
- Country: Germany

Manfred Christoph (28 May 1931 – 1994) was a German chess player who won West Germany Chess Championship (1969).

== Biography ==
In 1969 in Königsfeld im Schwarzwald Manfred Christoph won West Germany Chess Championship. It is curious that initially Christoph was not supposed to play in this championship. He was a reserve participant and received a place in the tournament two days before it began after the refusal of one of the main participants. At the start of the tournament, Christoph scored 7 points out of 8, and after a draw in the 9th round, he had 2 more wins. He secured the title of champion 3 rounds before the end of the competition.

With West German Chess Team Manfred Christoph participated in European Team Chess Championship in 1973, in Clare Benedict Cups in 1970 where West Germany team won bronze, in Nordic Cup Chess Team Tournaments (1970, 1973, 1975), where West Germany team won tournament in 1970 and 1975, and a number of international matches.

Christoph died in 1994.
