= Ursula Wasnetsky =

German chess player

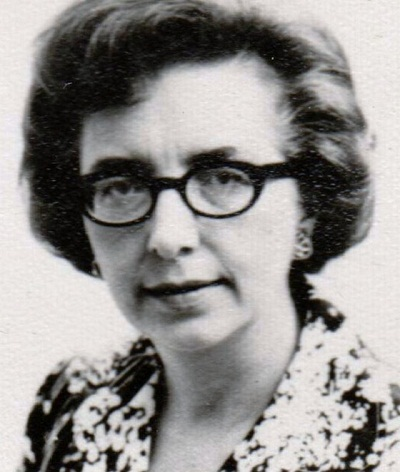
- Ursula Wasnetsky in 1978

Personal information
- Born: 9 October 1931 Spremberg, Germany
- Died: 29 January 2009 (aged 77)

Chess career
- Country: West Germany; Germany

Ursula Wasnetsky (9 October 1931 – 29 January 2009) was a German chess player. She was a winner the West Germany Women's Chess Championship (1968).

== Biography ==
From the 1960s to the 1970s, Ursula Wasnetsky was one of the leading chess players in the West Germany. She won three medals in West Germany Women's Chess Championships: gold (1964), silver (1972) and bronze (1970). In 1975, she won West Germany Open Women's Chess Championship.

Ursula Wasnetsky played for West Germany in the Women's Chess Olympiads:

- In 1969, at first board in the 4th Chess Olympiad (women) in Lublin (+1, =3, -6),
- In 1972, at first reserve board in the 5th Chess Olympiad (women) in Skopje (+1, =4, -1).
- In 1974, at second board in the 6th Chess Olympiad (women) in Medellín (+3, =2, -8),
- In 1976, at first reserve board in the 7th Chess Olympiad (women) in Haifa (+1, =1, -4).

Known as chess's life organizer. In the early 1970s, she organized the first girls' tournaments in West Germany. She was the women's secretary from 1958 to 1960 at the Berlin Chess Federation, and from 1972 to 1973 and from 1985 to 2006 at the Baden Chess Federation. From 1972 to 1977 she was the German Chess Federation board member. In 1992, she was elected to the FIDE Women's Commission.

In 1989, Ursula Wasnetsky received from Baden Chess Federation the Golden Badge of Honor, but in 1997 she became the Honorary Membership of Baden Chess Federation. On December 3, 2008, she was awarded the Order of Merit of the Federal Republic of Germany.
