= Paul Tröger =

German chess player (1913–1992)

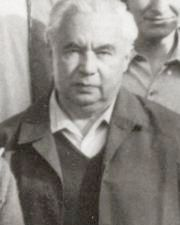
- Paul Tröger in 1975

Personal information
- Born: 28 June 1913 Augsburg, German Empire
- Died: 20 January 1992 (aged 78) Cologne, Germany

Chess career
- Country: West Germany

Paul Tröger (28 June 1913 – 20 January 1992) was a German chess player and sport journalist, West Germany Chess Championship winner (1957).

== Biography ==
Paul Tröger won three medals in West Germany Chess Championship: gold (1957), silver (1949) and bronze (1961). He won international chess tournaments in Kirchheim unter Teck (1947) and Kapfenberg (1955, shared 1st place with Karl Robatsch).

Paul Tröger played for West Germany in the Chess Olympiads:

- In 1958, at second board in the 13th Chess Olympiad in Munich (+4, =3, -5),
- In 1962, at fourth board in the 15th Chess Olympiad in Varna (+4, =5, -3).

Paul Tröger played for West Germany in the European Team Chess Championships:

- In 1961, at fifth board in the 2nd European Team Chess Championship in Oberhausen (+0, =5, -3),
- In 1965, at sixth board in the 3rd European Team Chess Championship in Hamburg (+1, =2, -2).

Also Paul Tröger played for West Germany in Clare Benedict Chess Cup (1958, 1962-1963, 1969) and in team competition won 2 gold (1962, 1963) and 2 bronze (1958, 1969) medals. With chess club SG Porz he three times won Chess Bundesliga (1967, 1979, 1982) and two times participated in European Chess Club Cup.

In the period from 1951 to 1955 Paul Tröger was the editor-in-chief of sports magazine Kicker. Later he was the editor of the publications in football magazine Fußball-Woche and chess magazine Deutschen Schachblätter. In 1985, Paul Tröger received the media prize of the German Chess Union.

== Literature ==
- Stuttgarter Neues Tagblatt: eine Zeitungsgeschichte. München: Inst. f. Zeitungswissenschaft an d. Univ. München; Zeitungswiss. Vereinigung in Komm. 1937.
- Mein Schach-Lesebuch: Kommentare, Glossen, Portraits, Partien. Bamberg: Bamberger Schachverlag 1983.
- Aus meinen Tagebüchern. Hollfeld: Beyer [1987]. ISBN 3-89168-004-X.
- Angriff und Gegenspiel: Pläne, Pointen, Pleiten. Stuttgart: Franckh 1987. ISBN 3-440-05736-4.
- Danke Partner, für Deinen Fehler!: Schach, Matt, Patt – auch Meister können straucheln. Stuttgart: Franckh 1989. ISBN 3-440-05899-9.
