= Gabriele Just =

German chess player

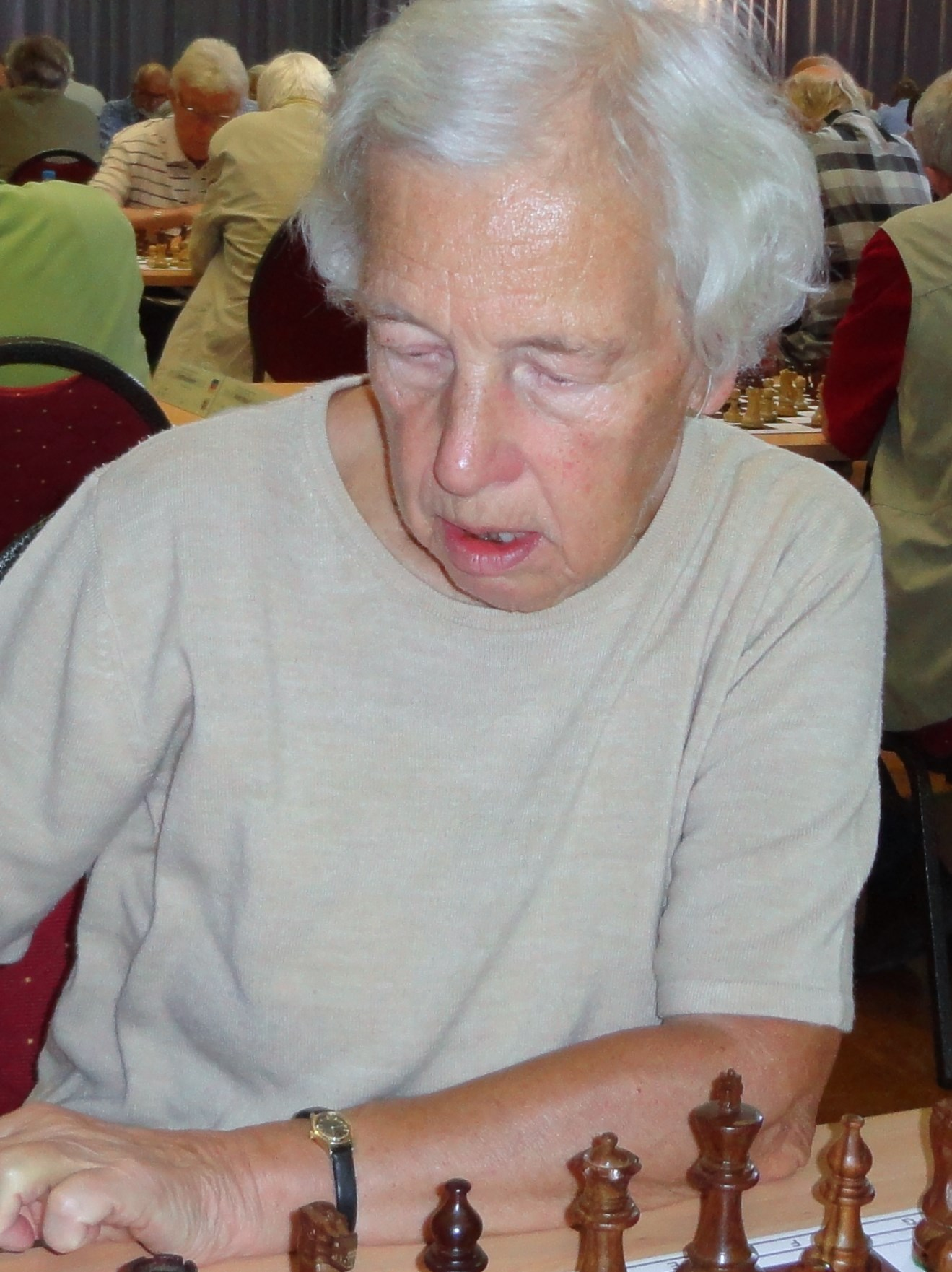
- Gabriele Just in 2013

Personal information
- Born: 28 September 1936
- Died: 26 February 2024 (aged 87)

Chess career
- Country: East Germany; Germany
- Peak rating: 2150 (January 1975)

Gabriele Just (28 September 1936 – 26 February 2024), née Ortlepp, was a German chess player. She was a three-time winner of the East Germany Women's Chess Championship (1964, 1965, 1972), and a physician by profession.

== Chess career ==
From the early 1960s to the early 1970s, Just was one of the leading East German chess players. She won the East Germany Women's Chess Championships three times: 1964, 1965, and 1972.

She played for East Germany in the Women's Chess Olympiads:

- In 1966, at first reserve board in the 3rd Chess Olympiad (women) in Oberhausen (+7−0=2), winning the team bronze medal and the individual silver medal;
- In 1969, at first reserve board in the 4th Chess Olympiad (women) in Lublin (+3−3=2);
- In 1972, at second board in the 5th Chess Olympiad (women) in Skopje (+4−3=3).

In the German Chess Women's Bundesliga, Just represented Leipzig chess club Leipzig 1899 from 1991 to 1996. In 1996, she won the German Open Senior Women's Chess Championship.

Just is also known as a correspondence chess player. She took part in the 2nd World Correspondence Chess Women's Championship (1972–1977), taking 7th place.

== Medical career ==
In 1965, she graduated from Leipzig University Faculty of Medicine and worked as a doctor in Leipzig for her entire work life.
