= Lothar Zinn =

German chess player (1938–1980)

Personal information
- Born: 19 March 1938 Erfurt, Germany
- Died: 29 February 1980 (aged 41) East Berlin, East Germany

Chess career
- Country: East Germany
- Title: International Master (1965)
- Peak rating: 2435 (July 1973)

Lothar Zinn (19 March 1938 — 29 February 1980) was an East German chess International Master (IM) (1965), East Germany Chess Championships winner (1961, 1965), European Team Chess Championship team and individual medalist (1970).

== Biography ==
Lothar Zinn achieved the first significant chess successes in 1955 and 1956, winning twice in row the titles of the East Germany Youth Chess champion. In the 1960s Lothar Zinn was one of the leading East Germany chess players. He twice won East Germany Chess Championships: in 1961 and 1965. He was also three-times the champion of the East Germany in blitz (1971, 1973, 1976) as well as the gold medalist of the East Germany championship in fast chess (1977). In 1965, he was awarded the FIDE International Master (IM) title.

Lothar Zinn played for East Germany in the Chess Olympiads:

- In 1962, at fourth board in the 15th Chess Olympiad in Varna (+3, =2, -4),
- In 1966, at first reserve board in the 17th Chess Olympiad in Havana (+4, =1, -4),
- In 1968, at third board in the 18th Chess Olympiad in Lugano (+4, =3, -3),
- In 1970, at first reserve board in the 19th Chess Olympiad in Siegen (+3, =4, -2).

Lothar Zinn played for East Germany in the European Team Chess Championship:

- * In 1970, at sixt board in the 4th European Team Chess Championship in Kapfenberg (+3, =3, -1), and won team and individual bronze medals.

Lothar Zinn played for East Germany in the World Student Team Chess Championships:

- In 1960, at second board in the 7th World Student Team Chess Championship in Leningrad (+4, =2, -5),
- In 1961, at first board in the 8th World Student Team Chess Championship in Helsinki (+9, =1, -2) and won team bronze medal,
- In 1962, at first board in the 9th World Student Team Chess Championship in Mariánské Lázně (+7, =3, -3),
- In 1963, at third board in the 10th World Student Team Chess Championship in Budva (+5, =2, -2),
- In 1964, at first board in the 11th World Student Team Chess Championship in Kraków (+6, =1, -5).
