= Peter Ostermeyer =

German chess player (born 1943)

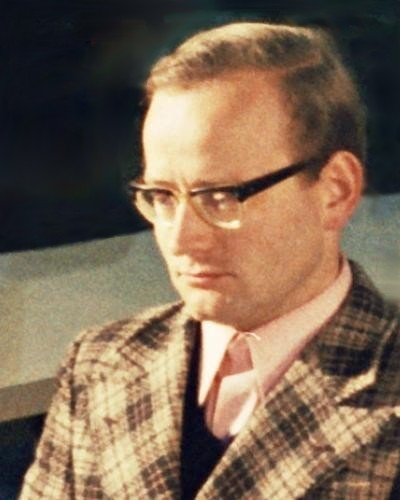
- Peter Ostermeyer in 1974

Personal information
- Born: 12 October 1943 (age 82) Würzburg, Nazi Germany

Chess career
- Country: Germany
- Title: International Master (1981)
- FIDE rating: 2402 (July 2026)
- Peak rating: 2485 (July 1985)

Peter Ostermeyer (born 12 October 1943) is a German chess International Master (1981), West German Chess Championship winner (1974).

== Biography ==
In 1961 and 1962, Peter Ostermeyer twice in row won West German Junior Chess Championship. In 1963, in Vrnjačka Banja he participated in World Junior Chess Championship and ranked in 12th place. In 1975, in Reykjavík he participated in World Chess Championship European zonal A tournament and shared 7th–9th place. Peter Ostermeyer won three medals in West German Chess Championship: gold (1974) and two silver (1982, 1984). In 1983, he was best from German chess player in German Open Chess Championship. In 1981, he won North Rhine-Westphalia State Chess Championship. He was the twice winner of the Chess Bundesliga with chess club Schachgesellschaft Solingen: in 1986/87 and 1987/88. Peter Ostermeyer was participant of a significant number of strong international chess tournaments. He was winner of international chess tournaments in Dortmund (1981; B tournament) and Düsseldorf (1995).

Peter Ostermeyer played for West Germany in the Chess Olympiads:

- In 1976, at first reserve board in the 22nd Chess Olympiad in Haifa (+2, =0, -2),
- In 1984, at first reserve board in the 26th Chess Olympiad in Thessaloniki (+3, =4, -2).

Peter Ostermeyer played for West Germany in the European Team Chess Championship:

- In 1977, at first reserve board in the 6th European Team Chess Championship in Moscow (+1, =3, -0) and won individual silver medal.

Peter Ostermeyer played for West Germany in the World Student Team Chess Championships:

- In 1968, at first reserve board in the 15th World Student Team Chess Championship in Ybbs (+3, =2, -1) and won team silver medal,
- In 1969, at second reserve board in the 16th World Student Team Chess Championship in Dresden (+4, =1, -1).

Peter Ostermeyer played for West Germany in the Nordic Chess Cups:

- In 1976, at first board in the 7th Nordic Chess Cup in Bremen (+2, =2, -1) and won team silver medal,
- In 1983, at first board in the 9th Nordic Chess Cup in Oslo (+2, =3, -2).

Peter Ostermeyer played for West Germany in the Men's Chess Mitropa Cup:

- In 1984, at second board in the 9th Chess Mitropa Cup in Bad Lauterberg (+1, =3, -1) and won team gold medal,

In 1981, he was awarded the FIDE International Master (IM) title.

In 2003, Peter Ostermeyer retired from performing in high-ranking chess tournaments.

Peter Ostermeyer holds a PhD in mathematics. Until the early 1980s he taught mathematics at one of the universities in Düsseldorf.
