= Lutz Espig =

German chess grandmaster (born 1949)

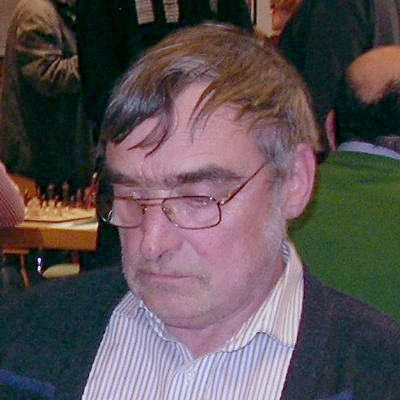
- Lutz Espig in 2010

Personal information
- Born: 5 January 1949 (age 77) Greiz, Germany

Chess career
- Country: Germany
- Title: Grandmaster (1983)
- Peak rating: 2505 (July 1990)

Lutz Espig (born 5 January 1949) is a German chess Grandmaster (1983) who was thrice East German Chess Champion (1969, 1971 and 1988). Lutz also was a Euroteams bronze medal winner (1970).

== Biography ==
Espig learned to play chess at the age of nine. His first club was Lok Greiz, later he played for Buna Halle. He studied mathematics and physics at the University Halle.

Espig won 1969 in Schwerin, 1971 in Strausberg and 1988 in Stralsund the East Germany Chess Championship. In 1988 he shared the title with Thomas Pähtz. In total, Lutz Espig took part in 26 German championships up to 2006, 21 of them in the GDR.

In 1972 he received the title of International Master (IM) from FIDE, and in 1983 the Grandmaster (GM) title.

== Team chess ==
Espig participated in the Chess Olympiad in 1988 and 1990 and participated in the European Team Chess Championship in 1970 for the East Germany chess team who won bronze medals. In the German Chess Bundesliga, Espig played for Münchener SC 1836 in the 1990/91 season, for PSV Duisburg in the 1994/95 season and from 1999 until 2004 at SK König Plauen, where he also subsequently in the 2. Chess Bundesliga and Oberliga played.
