= Irmgard Kärner =

German chess player (1927–2014)

Personal information
- Born: 20 February 1927 Frankfurt, Germany
- Died: 23 August 2014 (aged 87)

Chess career
- Country: West Germany; Germany

Irmgard Kärner (20 February 1927 – 23 August 2014), also Irmgard Karner, was a German chess player. She was a winner the West Germany Women's Chess Championship (1964).

== Biography ==
From the 1960s to the early 1970s, Irmgard Kärner was one of the leading chess players in the West Germany. She won four medals in West Germany Women's Chess Championships: gold (1964), two silver (1965, 1970) and bronze (1962).

Irmgard Kärner played for West Germany in the Women's Chess Olympiads:

- In 1966, at first reserve board in the 3rd Chess Olympiad (women) in Oberhausen (+0, =1, -5),
- In 1969, at first reserve board in the 4th Chess Olympiad (women) in Lublin (+3, =2, -4),
- In 1972, at second board in the 5th Chess Olympiad (women) in Skopje (+4, =2, -2).

Irmgard Kärner played chess until old age. She twice won the third place at the German Women's Senior Championship (1996, 2002). In 2000, Irmgard Kärner shared 1st place in German Women's Senior Championship.

== Literature ==
- Michael Dombrowsky: Vor 50 Jahren: Zwei denkwürdige Schacholympiaden from ChessBase
- In Dresden ist die Welt am Zug! from schacholympiade.org

== Other sources ==
- Bulletin of 18. German Women's Championship, Bremen 27.9. – 10.10.1964
- Deutsche Meisterschaften der Frauen from TeleSchach
- Der Schachclub Starnberg trauert um Irmgard Karner from SC Starnberg
