= Ralf Lau =

German chess grandmaster (born 1959)

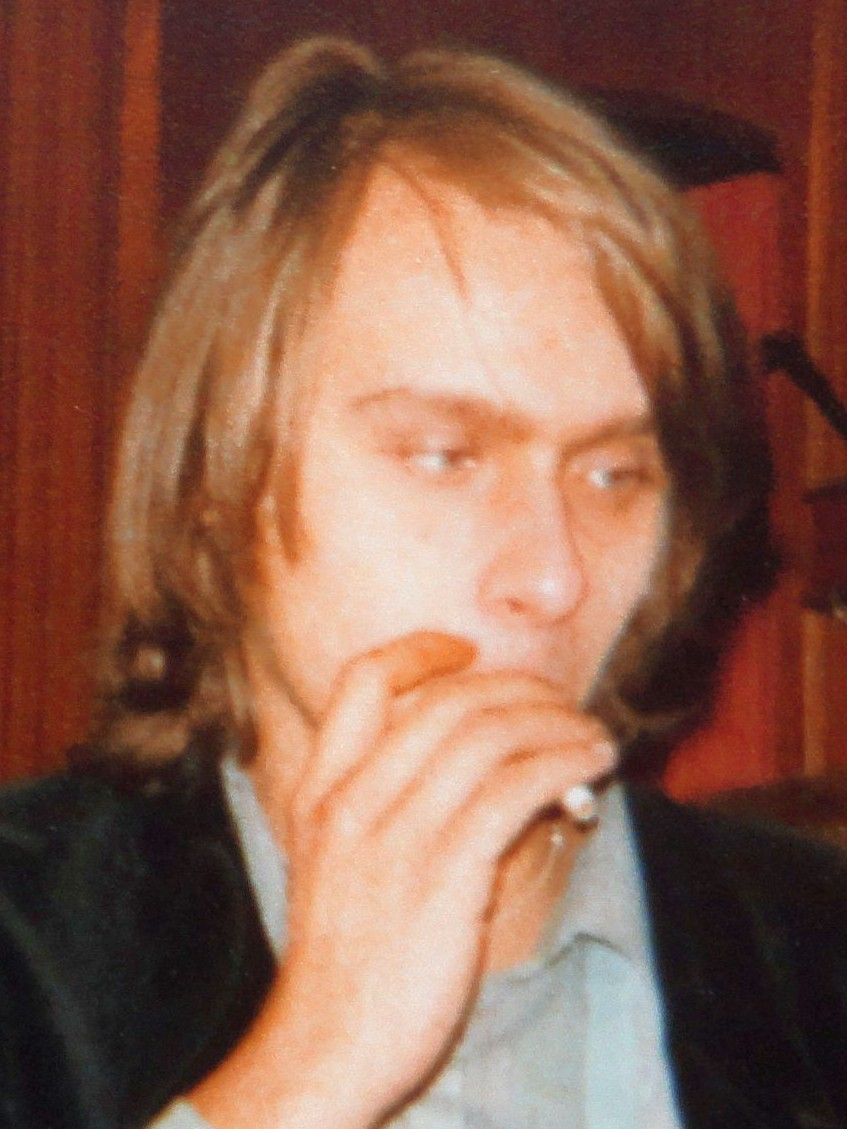

Personal information
- Born: October 19, 1959 (age 67) Bremen, Germany

Chess career
- Country: Germany
- Title: Grandmaster (1986)
- FIDE rating: 2442 (November 2026)
- Peak rating: 2555 (July 1987)

Ralf Lau (born 19 October 1959 in Bremen) is a German chess grandmaster.

== Chess career ==
Ralf Lau began his chess career in his hometown of Bremen. He played for Delmenhorster SK During the mid-1970s, he participated several times in the finals of the German team championship with them.

In the late 1970s, he moved to the Solingen SG 1868, for which he played until 1993 and again from 1994 to 1998. With Solingen, he was in 1980, 1981, 1987, 1988 and 1997 German team champion and won the 1990 European Club Cup. In addition, Lau was in the Bundesliga for the SC Stadthagen (in the 1993/94 season), the Lübeck chess club of 1873 (in the season 1999/2000) and the SC Kreuzberg (2002-2006) active. In the Austrian state league and Bundesliga, he played in the 1999/2000 season for SK Hietzing and from 2002 to 2004 for SV Tschaturanga.

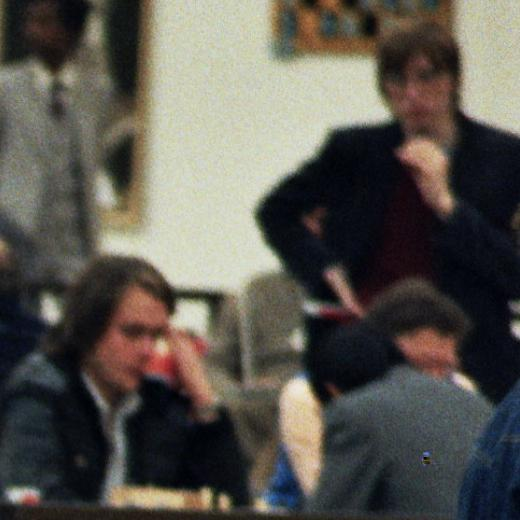
Ralf Lau, Hans-Joachim Hecht und Stefan Kindermann,1984 bei der Schacholympiade in Thessaloniki

In the 1980s, he began a professional career and had many successes: in 1982 he became international champion, in 1986 appointed him the World Chess Federation at the Congress in Dubai for Grand Master.

He won in 1985 and 1986 in Budapest, was second in 1985 in New York City and 1986 in Solingen. In 1987 in Bad Neuenahr he was tied with Vlastimil Hort and was (after puncture and scoring) finished second in the German Championship. In the championship in 1989 in Bad Neuenahr he finished third, behind Hort and Schmittdiel. In 1978 at the German Championship in Bad Neuenahr Lau finished in second place behind Luděk Pachman.

In 1984, 1986 and 1988 he played for the Federal Republic of Germany in the Chess Olympiad and achieved a positive result (11 wins, 7 draws, 5 defeats), and he participated in the team's World Cup 1985 and the European Team Championship in 1983 part.

Lau ended his professional career in the mid-1990s and took up residence in the Republic of Austria. In the FIDE Rankings, he is listed as inactive since he has played no more valued games since the Upper Austrian league of the season 2011/12.
