= Klaus Wockenfuss =

German chess player (1951–2022)

Personal information
- Born: 29 August 1951 Ratzeburg, Germany
- Died: 11 May 2022 (aged 70) München, Germany

Chess career
- Country: Germany
- Title: International Master (1987)
- Peak rating: 2415 (July 1987)

Klaus Wockenfuss (29 August 1951 – 11 May 2022) was a German chess International Master (1987) and a West German Chess Championship winner (1976).

== Biography ==
In the 1970s and 1980s Klaus Wockenfuss was one of the leading chess players in West Germany. In 1976, he won West German Chess Championship. Klaus Wockenfuss was winner of international chess tournaments in Wilhelmsfeld (1983) and Kraków (1986).

Klaus Wockenfuss played for West Germany in the Chess Olympiad:

- In 1976, at second reserve board in the 22nd Chess Olympiad in Haifa (+3, =3, -0).

Klaus Wockenfuss played for West Germany in the World Student Team Chess Championship:

- In 1977, at first board in the 22nd World Student Team Chess Championship in Mexico City (+1, =3, -6).

Klaus Wockenfuss played for West Germany in the Nordic Chess Cups:

- In 1974, at fifth board in the 5th Nordic Chess Cup in Eckernförde (+1, =1, -3) and won team gold medal,
- In 1975, at sixth board in the 6th Nordic Chess Cup in Hindås (+3, =1, -1) and won team and individual gold medals,
- In 1976, at second board in the 7th Nordic Chess Cup in Bremen (+0, =3, -2) and won team silver medal.

Klaus Wockenfuss played for West Germany in the Men's Chess Mitropa Cup:

- In 1976, at reserve board in the 1st Chess Mitropa Cup in Innsbruck (+1, =1, -1) and won team gold medal.

In 1987, Klaus Wockenfuss was awarded the FIDE International Master (IM) title.

Klaus Wockenfuss has lived in Munich since 1988. He is a qualified economist, but has been working in the IT industry for over 20 years as a programmer, database administrator, quality assurance and security officer. In 1995 Klaus Wockenfuss wrote a short autobiography with 55 chess games. His second great passion is running: marathon and half marathon.
