= Petra Feibert =

German chess player

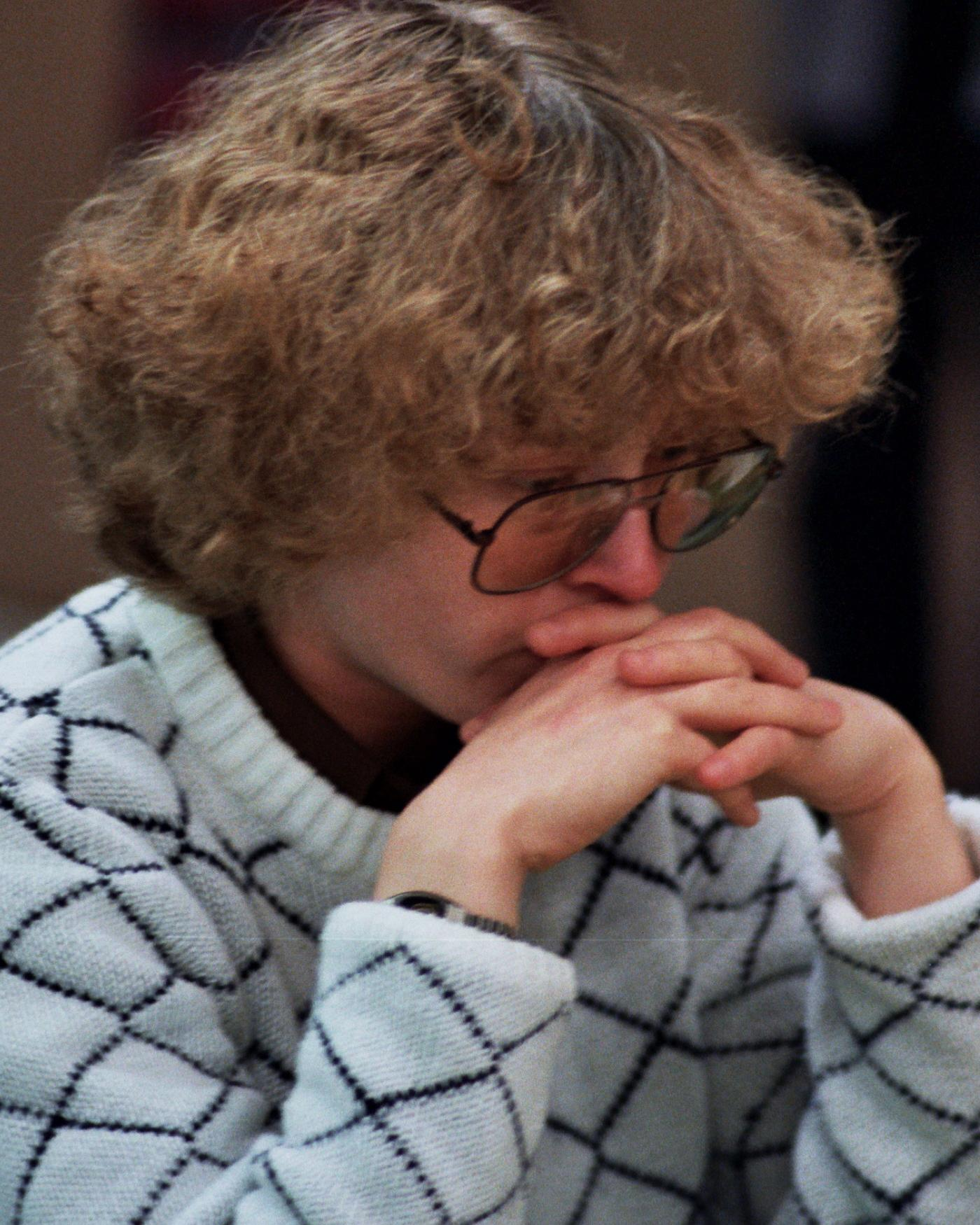
- Feibert in 1982

Personal information
- Born: 11 June 1958 Gera, East Germany
- Died: 18 July 2010 (aged 52) Pirmasens, Rhineland-Palatinate, Germany

Chess career
- Country: East Germany; West Germany; Germany
- Title: Woman International Master (1977)
- Peak rating: 2255 (January 1988)

Petra Feibert (née Feustel, 11 June 1958 – 18 July 2010) was a German chess player who held the title of Woman International Master (WIM, 1977). She was a three-time winner the East Germany Women's Chess Championship (1974, 1976, 1977).

== Biography ==
In the 1970s, she was one of the leading chess players in the East Germany. She won the East Germany Women's Chess Championships three times: 1974, 1976 and 1977, while in 1975 and 1978 she won silver medals (in both cases after extra match). In 1976, she participated at Women's World Chess Championship Interzonal Tournament in Tbilisi and shared 7th-8th place. In 1977, she was awarded the FIDE Woman International Master (WIM) title.

In 1979 she was arrested for trying to emigrate from the East Germany and sentenced to 4 years in prison. After 20 months of serving the sentence she was released and forced to leave the country. She then left for the Federal Republic of Germany and lived in Mannheim.

In 1984 and 1985, she twice won the titles of the West German champion in fast chess. In 1985, she also played for national team at the team tournament Nordic Cup in the Pohja, where the West Germany team took the fourth place.

Petra Feibert played for West Germany in the Women's Chess Olympiads:

- In 1982, at second board in the 10th Chess Olympiad (women) in Lucerne (+4, =7, -1),
- In 1984, at first reserve board in the 26th Chess Olympiad (women) in Thessaloniki (+5, =2, -3),
- In 1986, at third board in the 27th Chess Olympiad (women) in Dubai (+4, =7, -2).

Since the beginning of the 1990s, she started very rarely in the tournaments classified by the FIDE. She was married to German FIDE master Fred Feibert.
