= Thomas Pähtz =

German chess grandmaster (born 1956)

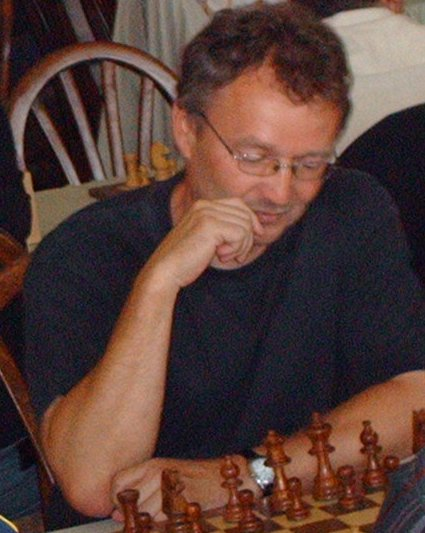
- Thomas Pähtz in 2007

Personal information
- Born: 4 September 1956 (age 69) Erfurt, East Germany

Chess career
- Country: East Germany; Germany (1990-)
- Title: Grandmaster (1990)
- Peak rating: 2515 (July 1988)

Thomas Pähtz, sometimes spelled Paehtz (born 4 September 1956) is a German chess Grandmaster (GM, 1990) who two times won East Germany Chess Championship (1988, 1990) and won German Chess Championship (1993).

== Biography ==
Pähtz was three co-winners at German Chess Championships, twice in the East Germany (1988 with Lutz Espig and 1990 with Raj Tischbierek), most recently in 1993 together with Thomas Luther. In 1988 Thomas Pähtz belonged to the 28th Chess Olympiad in Thessaloniki to the East Germany team and played at first reserve board (+0 =2 −1).

Pähtz works as a chess trainer and directs the Schachschule (Kerspleben). Among other students, he has been training his daughter Elisabeth Pähtz, who is Grandmaster, and his son Thomas Pähtz junior, who won the German youth championship in 2001.

Pähtz won the East Germany Team Chess Championship in 1973 and 1983 with the Schachgemeinschaft Leipzig, in 1988 with Microelectronics Erfurt and in 1991 with SV Erfurt-West. In the German Chess Bundesliga Pähtz played in the 1990/91 season for the SF Dortmund-Brackel, from 1991 to 1993 for the SV Erfurt West, for which he 2001 to 2003 (under the club name Erfurter SK) played again. In 1994 he took part in the European Chess Club Cup with PSV Duisburg. In the 2014/15 season he played for Ilmenauer SV, since 2017 he has been a member of TSV Bindlach-Aktär. In the Austrian Chess Bundesliga he played from 2002 to 2004 for ESV Austria Graz, with whom he became 2003 team champion, in the Belgian interclub from 2003 to 2005 for the second team of KSK 47 Eynatten, with whose first team he took part in the 2003 European Chess Club Cup. In the Luxembourg National Chess Division he played until 2003 for the team of Gambit Bonnevoie, with which he won Team Championships in 1996, 1997, 2001, 2002 and 2003, and competed in the European Chess Club Cup three times (1993, 1998, 2001). From 2003 to 2006 he played for De Sprénger Echternach, with which he won Luxembourg Chess Team Championship in 2005 and 2006.

In May 2002, the German Chess Federation thanked him and acknowledged him in the form of an honorary certificate.
