= Ekaterina Borulya =

Ukrainian-German chess player (born 1969)

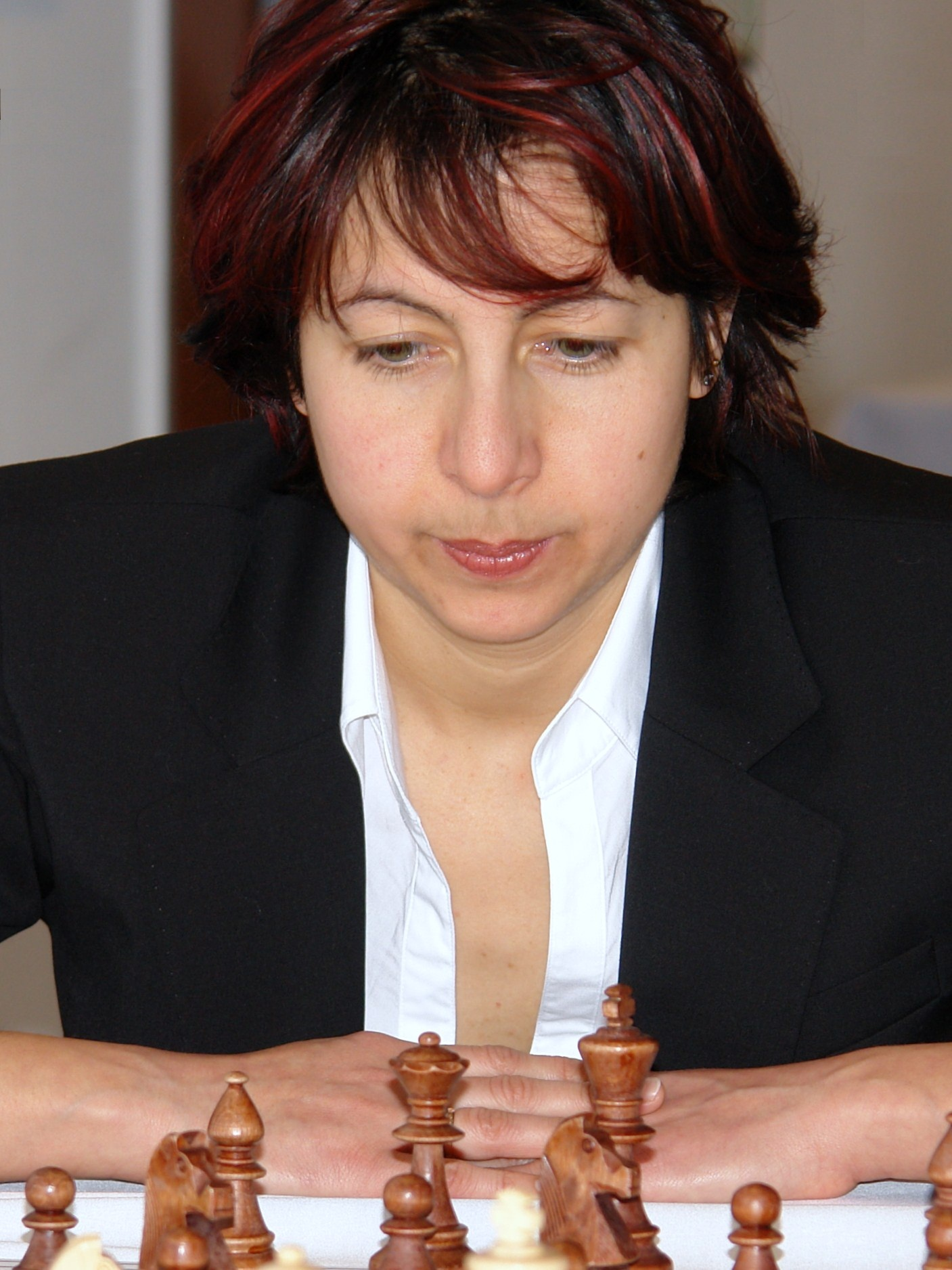
- Ekaterina Borulya in 2009

Personal information
- Born: 31 December 1969 (age 56) Kyiv, Ukraine

Chess career
- Country: Soviet Union (until 1991); Ukraine (1992–1994); Germany (from 1995)
- Title: Woman Grandmaster (1994)
- FIDE rating: 2299 (January 2014)
- Peak rating: 2385 (July 1996)

Ekaterina Borulya (Ukrainian: Катерина Юріївна Боруля; born 31 December 1969) is a German chess Woman Grandmaster (WGM, 1994) of Ukrainian descent who won Open German Women's Chess Championship (1994). As a physiotherapist, she is known by the name Katja Borulya.

== Career and Profession ==
Ekaterina Borulya has held the FIDE title Woman Grandmaster (WGM) since 1994. (Note: Willy Iclicki: FIDE Golden book 1924–2002. Euroadria, Slovenia, 2002, S. 82) She is a qualified chess trainer (A-Trainer), qualified sports coach, physiotherapist and works for the chess center in Baden-Baden. (Note: Ekaterina Borulya)

== Chess successes ==
Her first major tournament was the 1990 USSR Women's Chess Championship in Podolsk, which Ketevan Arakhamia won. (Note: Sowjetische Meisterschaft der Frauen 1990) In 1994 in Wuppertal she won first place at the Open German Women's Chess Championship. (Note: 12. Offene Deutsche Damenmeisterschaft 1994 in Wuppertal) At the German Women's Chess Championship in 1995 in Krefeld she was second after a playoff behind Tatiana Grabuzova. (Note: 33. Deutsche Damenmeisterschaft 1995 in Krefeld) In 1995 in Enghien-les-Bains she outperformed her husband Yaroslav Srokovski with 5 points from 9 games. (Note: Enghien les Bains 1st 1995) First was Igor Rausis with 6.5 points ahead of Étienne Bacrot.

Team matches in the German Chess Women's Bundesliga, she first played for the Krefelder Schachklub Turm 1851 (season 1994/95 to season 2000/01), since the season 2002/03 Borulya plays for OSG Baden-Baden (until December 2004 SC Baden-Oos, from December 2004 to June 2008 OSC Baden-Baden), with which she won the Chess Women's Bundesliga in the seasons 2002/03, 2003/04, 2004/05, 2007/08, 2008/09, 2010/11 and 2012/13.

At the Chess Olympiad 2002 in Bled she played for the German women's team on the reserve board. (Note: OlimpBase :: Women's Chess Olympiads :: Ekaterina Borulya)

Borulya is listed as inactive by FIDE (as of November 2016) because she last played in two competitions of the Chess Women's Bundesliga 2013/14 Elo-rated games in November and December 2013.

== Family ==
Ekaterina Borulya is married to the Chess International Master (IM) Yaroslav Srokovski. (Note: Spelling at the request of the man (signature), different spellings will be changed.) They have two children: Alexander Srokovski and Andrea Jaqueline Srokovski, (Note: The DWZ index card of the German Chess Federation states: Srokovskiy, Alexander; Srokovskiy, Andrea; IM Srokovskiy, Yaroslav and GM Borulya, Ekaterina Uriivna, which will probably be corrected after clarification. There are also different spellings for her husband.) who also have chess successes. Andrea was German Youth Chess Vice Champion in age group U10 in 2007, as well as third at the German Youth Chess Championship in age groups U12 and U14. Alexander's best result was a shared first place at the Baden Youth Chess Championship in age group U14.

Her twin sister Luba Borulia, also a good chess player, is married to the Israeli chess grandmaster Boris Alterman.
