= Waltraud Nowarra =

German chess player (1940–2007)

Personal information
- Born: 14 November 1940 Köslin, Poland
- Died: 27 October 2007 (aged 66) Dresden, Germany

Chess career
- Country: East Germany; Germany
- Title: Woman International Master (1966)
- Peak rating: 2220 (January 1990)

Waltraud Nowarra (née Schameitat, 14 November 1940 – 27 October 2007) was a German chess player who held the title of Woman International Master (WIM, 1966). She was a seven-time winner the East Germany Women's Chess Championship (1958, 1961, 1962, 1963, 1967, 1968, 1968).

== Biography ==
In the 1960s, Nowarra was one of the leading chess players in the East Germany. She won the East Germany Women's Chess Championships seven times: 1958, 1961, 1962, 1963, 1967, 1968 and 1968, and also won silver (1957) and two bronze (1959, 1973) medals. In 1966, Waltraud Nowarra won Women's World Chess Championship Zonal Tournament. In 1967, she participated in the Women's World Chess Championship Candidates Tournament in Subotica and taken 10th place. In 1970, she shared with Valentina Borisenko first place in the International Women's Chess tournament in Halle, but in 1972 she won the first place in the International Women's Chess tournament in Piotrków Trybunalski.

Nowarra played for East Germany in the Women's Chess Olympiads:

- In 1963, at second board in the 2nd Chess Olympiad (women) in Split (+6, =2, -2) and won the team bronze medal and the individual bronze medal,
- In 1966, at second board in the 3rd Chess Olympiad (women) in Oberhausen (+1, =2, -3) and won the team bronze medal,
- In 1969, at first board in the 4th Chess Olympiad (women) in Lublin (+5, =3, -2),
- In 1972, at first board in the 5th Chess Olympiad (women) in Skopje (+2, =0, -4).

In 1966, she was awarded the FIDE Woman International Master (WIM) title.
