= Anneliese Brandler =

German chess player

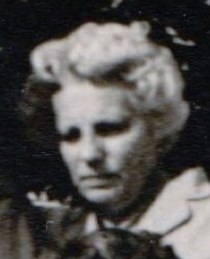
- Anneliese Brandler in 1959

Personal information
- Born: 4 March 1904 Hamburg, Germany
- Died: 1970

Chess career
- Country: Germany; West Germany

Anneliese Brandler (4 March 1904 – 1970) was a German chess player who won the West Germany Women's Chess Championship in 1962.

== Biography ==
In the 1950s and in the 1960s, Anneliese Brandler was one of the leading chess players in the West Germany. She won six medals in West Germany Women's Chess Championships: gold (1962), three silver (1957, 1958, 1963) and two bronzes (1959, 1961).

Brandler played for West Germany in the Women's Chess Olympiad:

- In 1963, at second board in the 2nd Chess Olympiad (women) in Split (+3, =2, -6).
