= Raj Tischbierek =

German chess player

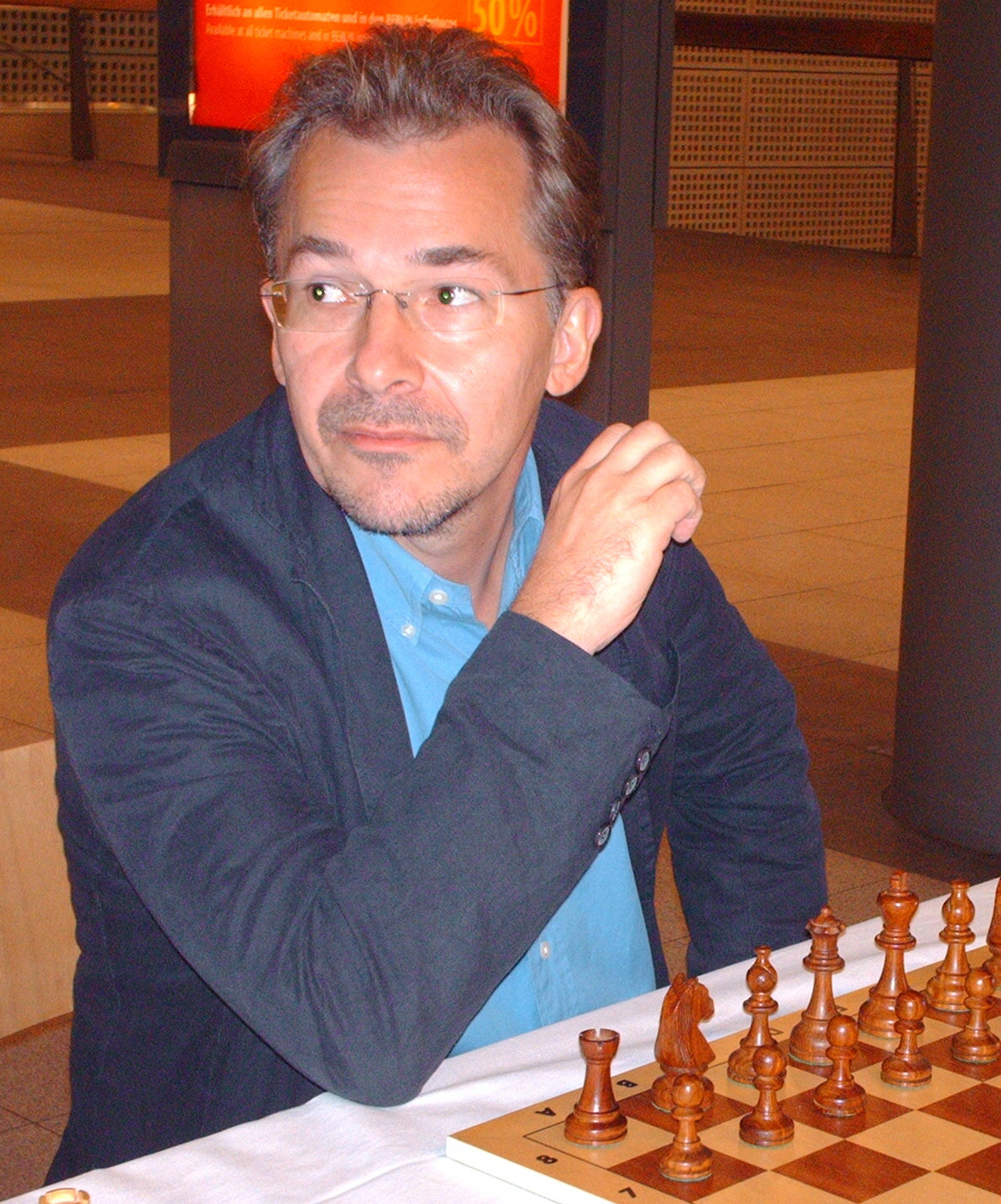
- Raj Tischbierek in 2017

Personal information
- Born: 24 September 1962 (age 63) Leipzig, Germany

Chess career
- Country: Germany
- Title: Grandmaster (1990)
- Peak rating: 2544 (July 1999)

Raj Tischbierek (born 24 September 1962) is a German chess Grandmaster (GM, 1990) who For the club he won East Germany Chess Championship twice (1987 and 1990).

== Life ==
Raj Tischbierek was introduced to chess by his father, who taught him when he was five years old. At the age of nine, he joined the club Chemie Leipzig. He won the East Germany Chess Championships twice - in 1987 and 1990. In 1990, he also won the East Germany Correspondence Chess Championship.

After graduating from Polytechnic Secondary School, he was trained as a skilled geology worker and also got his Abitur. However, he never worked as a skilled worker, but moved to Berlin in 1989. In 1991, he took over the magazine Schach as Editor-in-Chief, for which he founded the Exzelsior Verlag (Excelsior Publishers) in 1999.

Raj Tischbierek was awarded Grandmaster (GM) title at the 1990 FIDE Congress. In May 2002, the German Chess Federation thanked him and acknowledged him in the form of an honorary certificate.

== National team ==
With the national team of the East Germany Tischbierek took part in the 29th Chess Olympiad in 1990.

== Clubs ==
In the German 1st Chess Bundesliga, Raj Tischbierek played from 1990 to 1992 for FTG Frankfurt, from 1992 to 1994 for SC Stadthagen, with whom he also took part in the European Chess Club Cup in 1993. In the 1994/95 season for Münchener SC 1836, from 1995 to 1997 for SV Empor Berlin, with whom he also took part in the 1996 European Chess Club Cup, from 1997 to 2000 for Dresdner SC, from 2002 to 2009 for SC Kreuzberg, in the 2010/11 season for FC Bayern Munich and since of the 2014/15 season for the USV TU Dresden. In the Austrian 1st Chess Bundesliga (until 2003 Staatsliga A) Tischbierek played from 1999 to 2003 for the 1. SSK Mozart, in the 2003/04 season for SV NÖ Melk-Wachau, from 2013 to 2018 he played for SIR Royal Salzburg.

== Publications ==
- Sternstunden des Schachs. 30 x Olympia. London 1927 – Manila 1992. Sportverlag Berlin 1992.
- SKA Turnier München 1994. Sportverlag Berlin 1994.
