= Wolfgang Pietzsch =

German chess grandmaster

Wolfgang Pietzsch (21 December 1930, Wittgendorf – 29 December 1996, Leipzig) was a German chess Grandmaster (1965). He played in the Chess Olympiads of 1952, 1958, 1960, 1962, 1966 and 1968.
