= 2006 in chess =

Events in chess in 2006:

== Events ==
=== May ===
- May 5 – The world's oldest living Grandmaster, Andor Lilienthal, celebrates his 95th birthday. In his career Lilienthal played World Champions Emanuel Lasker, José Raúl Capablanca, Alexander Alekhine, and Mikhail Botvinnik.

=== October ===
- Vladimir Kramnik (Russia) defeats Veselin Topalov (Bulgaria) in the 2006 World Championship title unification match to become undisputed world champion.

=== December ===
- December 26 – The All India Chess Federation imposes a ten-year ban on Umakant Sharma for using a Bluetooth device sewn into his cap to gain assistance from a chess computer during a FIDE rated tournament in Delhi.
- December 29 – 44th Indian Chess Championship (National "A" Championship) in Atul won by GM Surya Shekhar Ganguly for the fourth consecutive year with the score 9/13. The tournament format was changed to a 13-round Swiss instead of the 22 player round-robin used previously.
- December 30 – Iranian Chess Championship in Tehran won by GM Ehsan Ghaem Maghami at 8.5/11. The women's champion is WGM Shadi Paridar scoring 9.5/11.

== Titles awarded ==
=== Grandmasters ===
In 2006 FIDE awarded the title of Grandmaster to the following players:

- Bassem Amin (b. 1988) Egypt
- Levan Aroshidze (b. 1985) Georgia
- David Arutinian (b. 1984) Georgia
- Valeriy Aveskulov (b. 1986) Ukraine
- Pascal Charbonneau (b. 1983) Canada
- Paweł Czarnota (b. 1988) Poland
- Chakkravarthy Deepan (b. 1987) India
- Dzhakay Dzhakaev (b. 1980) Russia
- Grzegorz Gajewski (b. 1985) Poland
- José González García (b. 1973) Mexico
- Andrey Gutov (b. 1978) Russia
- Gennadij Ginsburg (b. 1971) Germany
- Bartłomiej Heberla (b. 1985) Poland
- Peter Horvath (b. 1972) Hungary
- Alojzije Janković (b. 1983) Croatia
- Radosław Jedynak (b. 1982) Poland
- Zoran Jovanović (b. 1979) Croatia
- Meelis Kanep (b. 1983) Estonia
- Melikset Khachiyan (b. 1970) United States
- Ibragim Khamrakulov (b. 1982) Spain
- Aleksandr Kharitonov (b. 1986) Russia
- Petr Kostenko (b. 1976) Kazakhstan
- Tigran Kotanjian (b. 1981) Armenia
- Sergei Krivoshey (b. 1971) Ukraine
- Yuriy Kryvoruchko (b. 1986) Ukraine
- Vitaly Kunin (b. 1983) Germany
- Viktor Láznička (b. 1988) Czechoslovakia
- Quang Liem Le (b. 1991) Vietnam
- Constantin Lupulescu (b. 1984) Romania
- Nidjat Mamedov (b. 1985) Azerbaijan
- Mikulas Manik (b. 1975) Slovenia
- Andrei Murariu (b. 1986) Romania
- Das Neelotpal (b. 1982) India
- Magesh Panchanathan (b. 1983) India
- Eugene Perelshteyn (b. 1980) United States
- Reefat Bin-Sattar (b. 1974) Bangladesh
- Davor Rogic (b. 1971) Croatia
- Andrey Rychagov (b. 1979) Russia
- Bator Sambuev (b. 1980) Russia
- Vasile Sanduleac (b. 1971) Moldova
- Konstantine Shanava (b. 1985) Georgia
- John Shaw (b. 1968) Scotland
- Andrey Sumets (b. 1980) Ukraine
- Jurij Tihonov (b. 1978) Belarus
- Todor Todorov (b. 1974) Bulgaria
- Marko Tratar (b. 1974) Slovenia
- Yge Visser (b. 1963) Netherlands
- Jan Werle (b. 1984) Netherlands
- Andrey Zhigalko (b. 1985) Belarus
- Zhou Jianchao (b. 1988) China
- Yaroslav Zinchenko (b. 1987) Ukraine

=== Woman Grandmaster ===
In 2006 FIDE awarded the title Woman Grandmaster to the following players:

- Evgeniya Doluhanova (b. 1984) Ukraine
- Marina Guseva (b. 1986) Russia
- Anastasia Gutsko (b. 1985) Ukraine
- Sopio Gvetadze (b. 1983) Georgia
- Thi Bao Tram Hoang (b. 1987) Vietnam
- Beata Kądziołka (b. 1986) Poland
- Julia Kochetkova (b. 1981) Russia
- Tatiana Kostiuk (b. 1982) Ukraine
- Liubov Kostiukova (b. 1983) Ukraine
- Lija Kucherova (b. 1986) Russia
- Naira Movsisian (b. 1977) Armenia
- Jessica Nill (b. 1979) Germany
- Niina Sammalvuo (b. 1971) Finland
- Anna Sharevich (b. 1985) Belarus
- Shen Yang (b. 1989) China
- Elena Tairova (1991–2010) Russia
- Carmen Voicu (b. 1981) Romania

== Births ==
- March 13 – Leon Luke Mendonca
- May 29 – Gukesh D

== Deaths ==
- January 15 – Herbert Avram (1913–2006), 92, United States.
- May 13 – Ratmir Kholmov (1925–2006), 80, Soviet/Russian Grandmaster.
- May 13 – Burt Hochberg (1933–2006), 73, chess writer and editor, editor of Chess Life.
- May 20 – Wolfgang Unzicker (1925–2006), 80, German Grandmaster, "world champion of amateurs".
- July 2 – René Letelier (1915–2006), 91, Chilean International Master.
- July 14 – Aleksander Wojtkiewicz (1963–2006), 43, Polish Grandmaster.
- July 23 – Rudolf Teschner (1922–2006), 84, German Grandmaster and chess writer.
- July 26 – Jessie Gilbert (1987–2006), 19, English Woman FIDE Master.
- August 14 – Adriaan de Groot (1914–2006), 92, Dutch chess master and psychologist.
- November 29 – Krystyna Hołuj-Radzikowska (1931–2006), 75, Polish Woman Grandmaster.
- December 5 – David Bronstein (1924–2006), 82, Soviet/Ukrainian Grandmaster and renowned chess writer, challenger in the 1951 World Championship match.
