= Dornbusch =

Dornbusch can refer to:

== Places ==
- Dornbusch (Frankfurt am Main)
- Dornbusch (Hiddensee), a natural region on the German Baltic Sea island of Hiddensee
- Dornbusch Lighthouse

== People ==
- George Dornbusch (1819–1873), Austrian-British merchant, publisher, and activist
- Rudi Dornbusch (1942–2002), German economist
- Tatiana Dornbusch (born 1982), Ukraine-French chess player
