= List of heritage buildings on Hiddensee =

This list of heritage buildings on Hiddensee lists all the historic monuments on the German Baltic Sea island of Hiddensee (county of Vorpommern-Rügen) by parish.

== Grieben ==
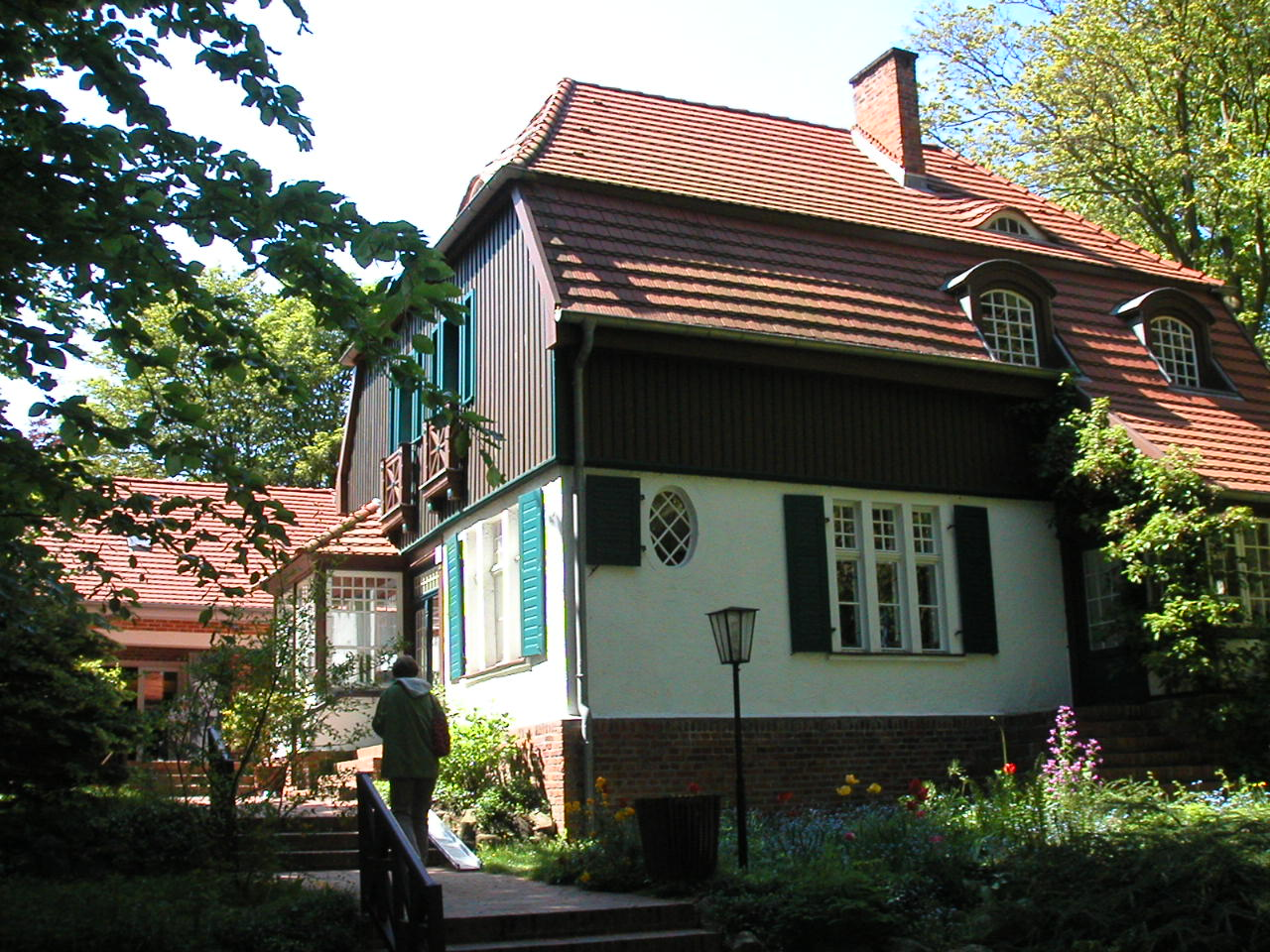
Seedorn Villa

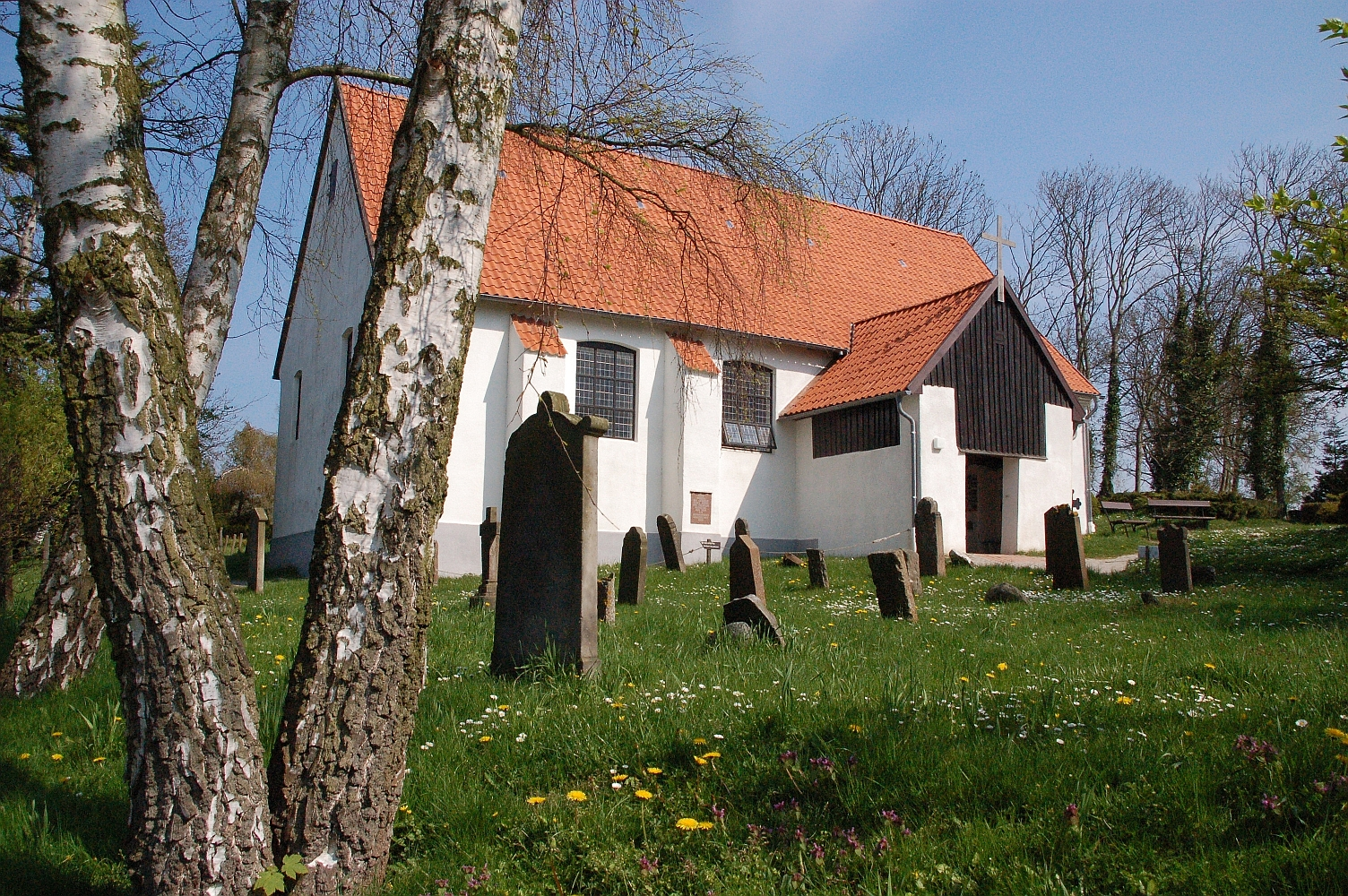
Kloster church

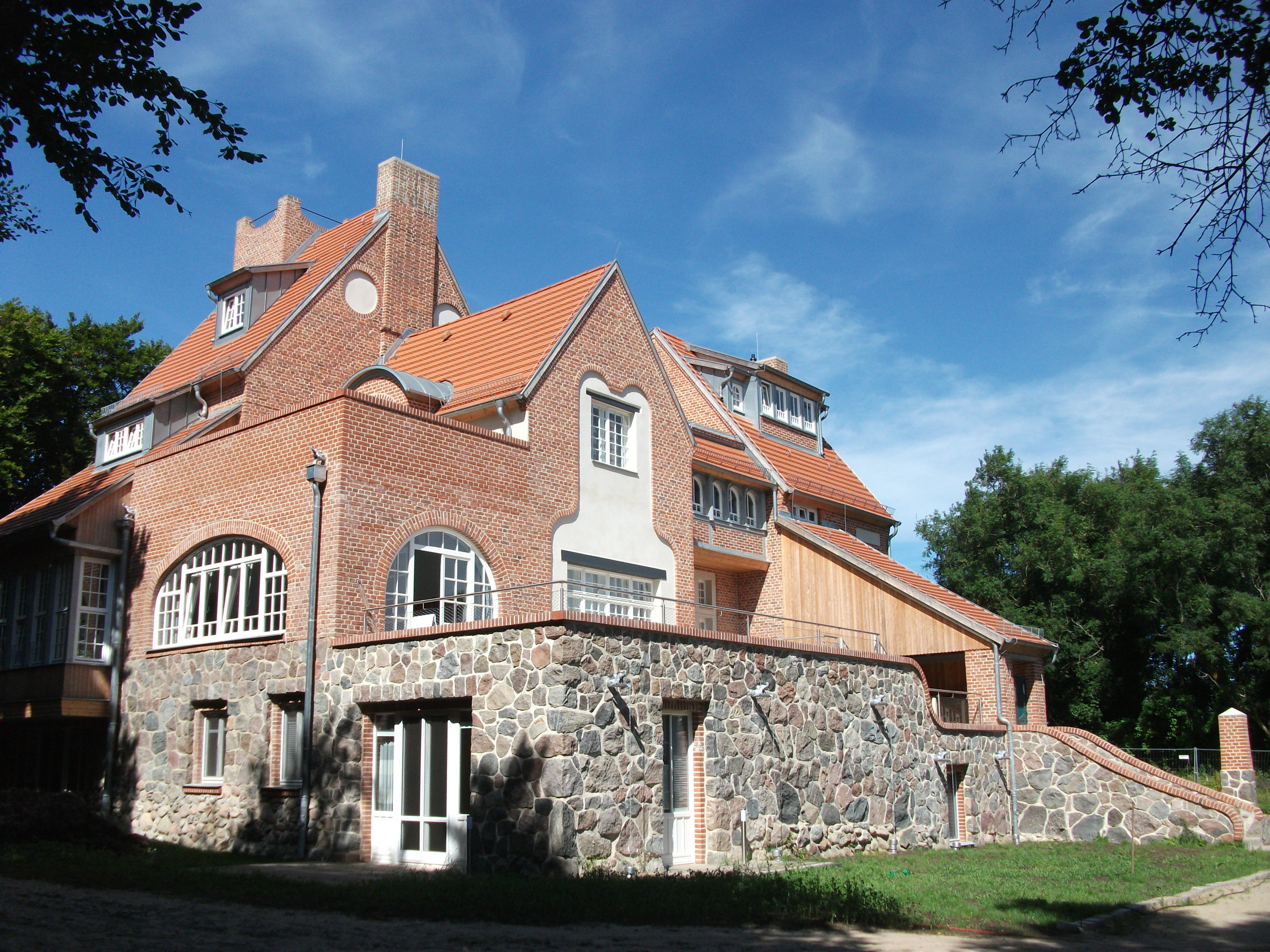
Lietzenburg, artist's mansion

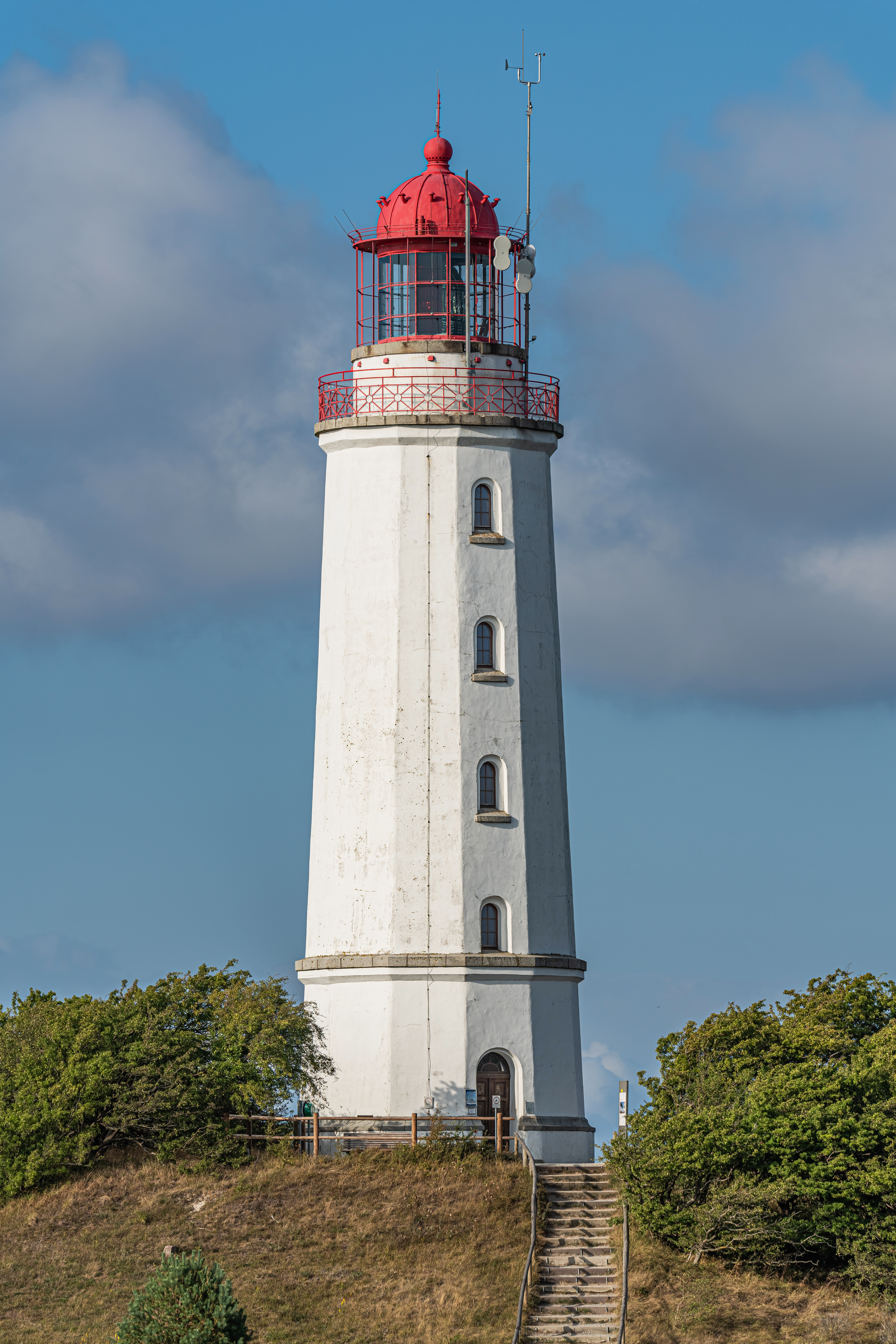
Dornbusch Lighthouse

- Dorfstraße 50; fisherman's house

== Kloster ==
- Am Klostertor; abbey gate
- Am Klostertor 6; home, first home of Gerhart Hauptmann
- Biologenweg 3; home
- Biologenweg 5; home (doctoral students' house) and seminary building
- Biologenweg 20; home
- Hügelweg 19; home (Haus Felsenstein, entire site), and guest house and garden
- Kirchweg 1; Museum (former lifeboat station)
- Kirchweg 13; cemetery with graves of Gerhard Hauptmann und grave steles near the church
- Kirchweg 13; Seedorn Villa and extensions (Gerhard Hauptmann Museum)
- Kirchweg 35; church
- Lighthouseweg; Dornbusch Lighthouse
- Zum Hochland; Lietzenburg
- Zum Hochland 17; former pension (today a bird house)

== Neuendorf ==
- Königsbarg 10; Groot Partie fisherman's shed
- Pluderbarg 7; Lütt Partie fisherman's shed
- Schabernack 13; home
- Schabernack 15; home
- Schabernack 17; home

== Vitte ==
- In den Dünen 127; inn
- Norderende 90; home
- Norderende 92/94; home and garden
- Norderende 140; home
- Norderende 172; windmill
- Sprenge 30; home
- Süderende 35: cottage
- Süderende 57; home (doctor's house) and stable
- Süderende 73; home
- Süderende 105: fisherman’s cottage (Hexenhaus = "witch’s house")
- Zum Segelhafen 7; home Asta Nielsen
- Zum Segelhafen 13; home, Nordperd
- Lighthouse on the Gellen
