= Oksana Vozovic =

Ukrainian chess player and kickboxer (born 1985)

Personal information
- Born: Оксана Возович; December 8, 1985 (age 40)

Chess career
- Country: Ukraine
- Title: Woman Grandmaster
- FIDE rating: 2341 (March 2010)
- Peak rating: 2368 (January 2003)

Oksana Vozovic (born 8 December 1985) is a Ukrainian chess Woman Grandmaster and kickboxer.

In 2003, she finished 3rd behind Alexander Zubov and Yuriy Kuzubov in Mykolaiv. She tied for 1st–2nd with Tatiana Kostiuk in the Rector Cup 2005 and tied for 1st–2nd with Evgeniya Doluhanova in the Femida 2005 tournament in Kharkiv. In 2006, she tied for 1st–2nd with Anna Ushenina in the Women's Ukrainian Chess Championship and won the event on tie-break. In the same year she won the Rector Cup in Kharkiv. In 2007, she won with the Ukrainian team a bronze medal in the World Team Chess Championship in Yekaterinburg.

On the March 2010 FIDE list her Elo rating is 2341.
