= Jessica Schmidt =

German chess player (born 1979)

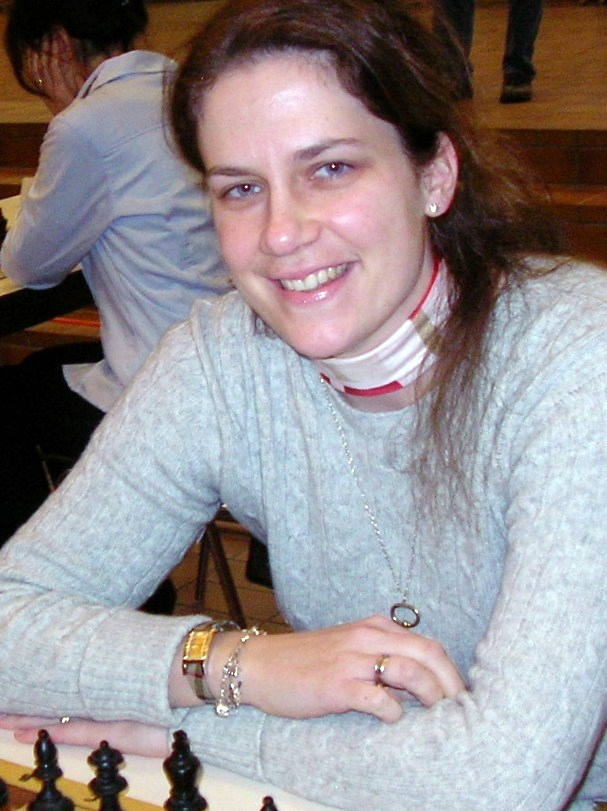
- Jessica Schmidt in 2012

Personal information
- Born: 11 October 1979 (age 46) Hainburg, Germany

Chess career
- Country: Germany
- Title: Women Grandmaster (2006)
- Peak rating: 2335 (October 2005)

Jessica Schmidt (née Nill, born 11 October 1979) is a German chess Women Grandmaster (WGM, 2006) who won German Women's Chess Championship (2001).

== Life ==
She learned to play chess from her father. Her brother Oliver (born 1982) is also a strong chess player (best Elo rating: 2255). She studied at the Technische Universität Darmstadt Electrical Engineering. She has been married since 2010.

== Chess career ==
She won the German Youth Chess Championships in 1994 (girls U15 group), in Dorfen 1995 (girls U17 group) in Wurmannsquick and 1996 (girls U17 group) in Kerwitz. In 1995 she finished tenth at the European Youth Chess Championship in U16 girls group in Żagań. She won the Hessian individual chess championship for women in 1995 in Hofheim, in 1996 in Hofbieber and in 1997 in Bergen-Enkheim. In 2000 she was third at the women's world chess championship of the FISU in Varna. In 2001 in Krefeld she won German Women's Chess Championship. In 2011 she won the German Women's Blitz Championship in Gladenbach.

In November 2000 she received the title of Women International master (WIM). Since September 2006 she has held the title Women Grandmaster (WGM). She achieved the norms for this at a WGM tournament in Krk in 2004, as well as at the European Women's Team Chess Championship 2005 in Gothenburg and at the 7th European Women's Individual Chess Championship in 2006 in Kuşadası. She won the Baden-Württemberg Women's Rapid Chess Championship in 2008 in Heidelberg with a lead of 1.5 points.

With the German national team, she took part in the European Women's Team Chess Championships in 2001, 2003 and 2005, receiving an individual gold medal in Gothenburg 2005 for her result of 6 points from 8 games on third board. She played in 2004 and in 2006 at the Women's Chess Olympiad for Germany. In 2007 she fought on board three of the German national team at the World Women's Team Chess Championship in Yekaterinburg.

Her first club was the Hessian SC Hainstadt, after which she moved to VSG Offenbach. From 1998 she played for the OSG Baden-Baden with whom she played in the Chess Women's Bundesliga seasons 2002/03, 2003/04 and 2004/05. Since the Chess Women's Bundesliga season 2007/08 she has been playing for the Karlsruher Schachfreunde (for whom she already played in the Chess Women's Bundesliga season 1999/2000 as a guest player) in the 2nd federal league South and the Oberliga Baden as well as with the women in the 1st and 2nd Chess Women's Bundesliga. In France, Jessica Schmidt plays with Cercle d’Echecs de Strasbourg.
