= Carmen Voicu-Jagodzinsky =

Romanian chess player (born 1981)

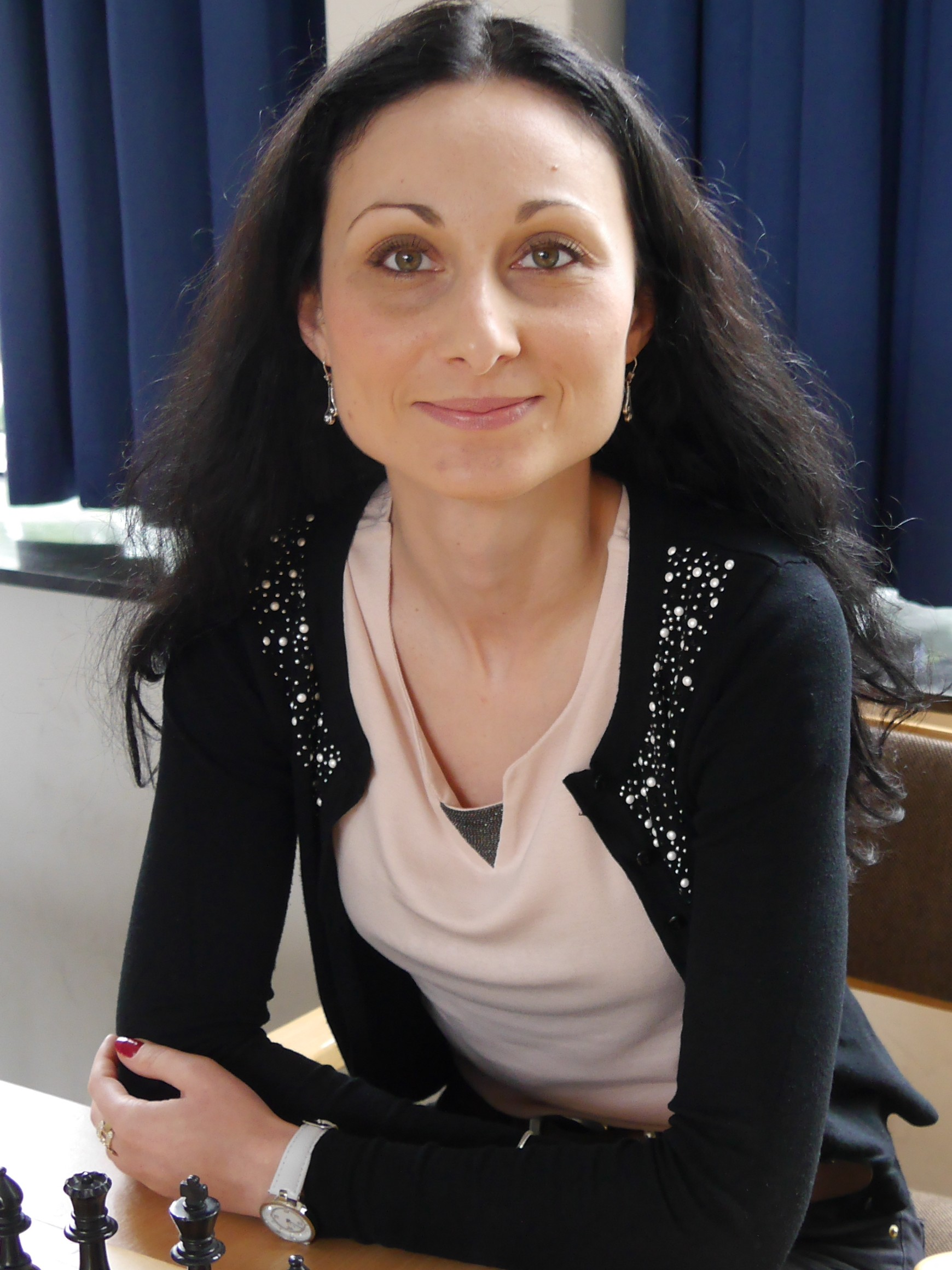
- Carmen Voicu-Jagodzinsky in 2016

Personal information
- Born: 25 April 1981 (age 45) Bucharest, Romania

Chess career
- Country: Romania
- Title: Woman Grandmaster (2006)
- Peak rating: 2359 (January 2007)

Carmen Voicu-Jagodzinsky (née Voicu; born 25 April 1981) is a Romanian chess Woman Grandmaster (WGM, 2006) who won the German Women's Chess Championship (2020).

== Biography ==
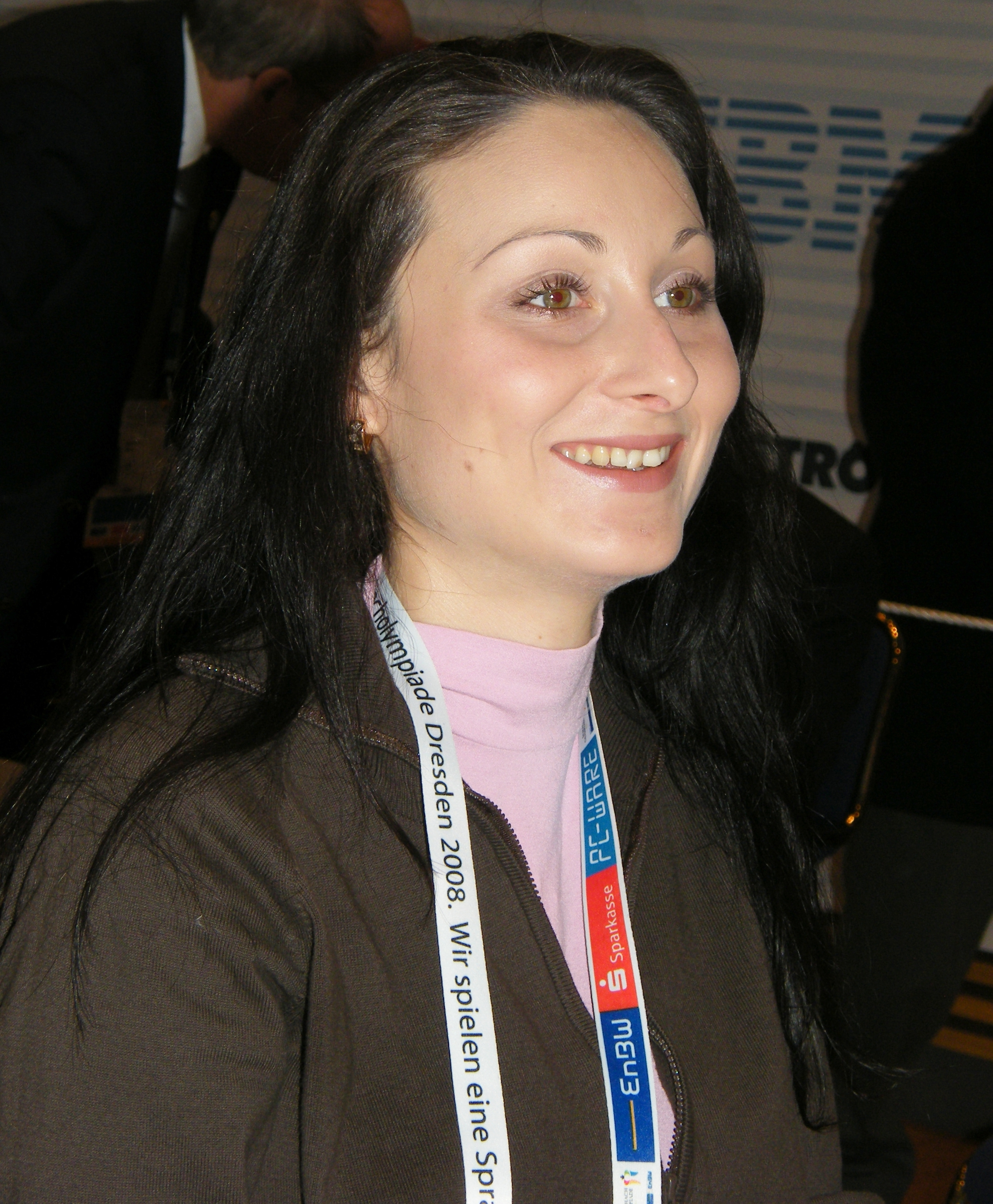
Carmen Voicu at the Chess Olympiad 2008 in Dresden

She was successful early on in International Girls' Chess Tournaments: at the 1st European Youth Chess Championship in age group U10 in 1991 in Mamaia, Romania, she came third. She won the World Youth Chess Championship in age group U10 in Warsaw in the same year ahead of Regina Pokorná. At the World Youth Chess Championship in age group U10 in 1993 in Bratislava, she was third. In 1998, she won a Round-robin tournament in Tapolca, in 2001, she was third at the Romanian Junior Championship in Băile Tuşnad. She was successful in the following city championships: Bucharest in 2004, Paris (A group) shared 1st place in 2004, Hemer shared 1st place in 2006 and Hemer in 2007. At the Romanian Women's Rapid Chess Championship in 2007, she finished second behind Corina-Isabela Peptan. Carmen Voicu-Jagodzinsky won the North Rhine-Westphalian Women's Individual Chess Championship in Herne in 2008 but was unable to qualify for the German Women's Chess Championship because she does not have German citizenship. She was eligible to play at the German women's singles championship in August 2020 in Magdeburg and won it.

In November 2002, she received the title of Woman International Master (WIM). Since September 2006, she has held the title of Woman Grandmaster (WGM). She achieved the norms for her WGM title within a year on the Black Sea in Ukraine: at a norms tournament in Alushta in July 2005, another norms tournament in Alushta in June 2006 (simultaneously an IM norm) as well as in the B group of the Sun Pawn Tournament in Illitschivsk. With her highest Elo rating of 2359 in January 2007, she was in the top 100 of the FIDE women's world rankings and was fourth in the Romanian women's Elo ranking.

== National team ==
With the Romanian women's national team she took part in the Chess Women's Olympiad in 2008 and 2010 each on the third board, the World Women's Team Chess Championship in 2013 as reserve player and the European Women's Team Chess Championships in 2007 on the second board, in 2009 on the third board and in 2011 and 2013, each as a reserve player.

== Clubs ==
She played club chess in Romania for C. S. Progresul Bucharest, from 2008 for CSU Brașov. In Belgium, Voicu played for KSK 47 Eynatten in the 2003/04 season, later for Schachfreunde Wirtzfeld, with whom they won the Belgian Team Chess Championship in 2013. In Chess Bundesliga, she plays for the SV Hemer 32, to whose chairman she is married, in the Verbandsklasse Nord (6th league) and Verbandsliga (5th league) and as a guest player in the women's team championships for the SK Grosslehna. With SK Grosslehna, she played from 2007 to 2011 and again from 2012 to 2016 in the 1st Women's Chess Bundesliga. She took part in the European Women's Chess Club Cup in 2008 in Kallithea and in 2008, won the German Women's Blitz Chess Team Championship.

== Coach ==
Carmen Voicu-Jagodzinsky is a qualified sports chess coach. Since 2013, she has had the A coaching license from the German Chess Federation. Since January 2016, she has been the state trainer of the Chess Federation of North Rhine-Westphalia, succeeding Thomas Michalczak. She also teaches chess at the Friedrich-Leopold-Woeste-Gymnasium in Hemer. Since 2020, she has been the women's representative of the Chess Federation North Rhine-Westphalia.
