= Liubov Kostiukova =

Ukrainian chess player (born 1983)

Personal information
- Born: 1983 (age 42–43)

Chess career
- Country: Ukraine
- Title: International Master (2006); Woman Grandmaster (2006)
- Peak rating: 2409 (July 2006)

Liubov Kostiukova is a Ukrainian chess player who holds the titles of International Master (IM) and Woman Grandmaster, both obtained in 2006.

In July 2006, when her rating peaked at 2409, she was ranked 47th in the world for women chess players.
