= Yaroslav Zinchenko =

Ukrainian chess grandmaster (born 1987)

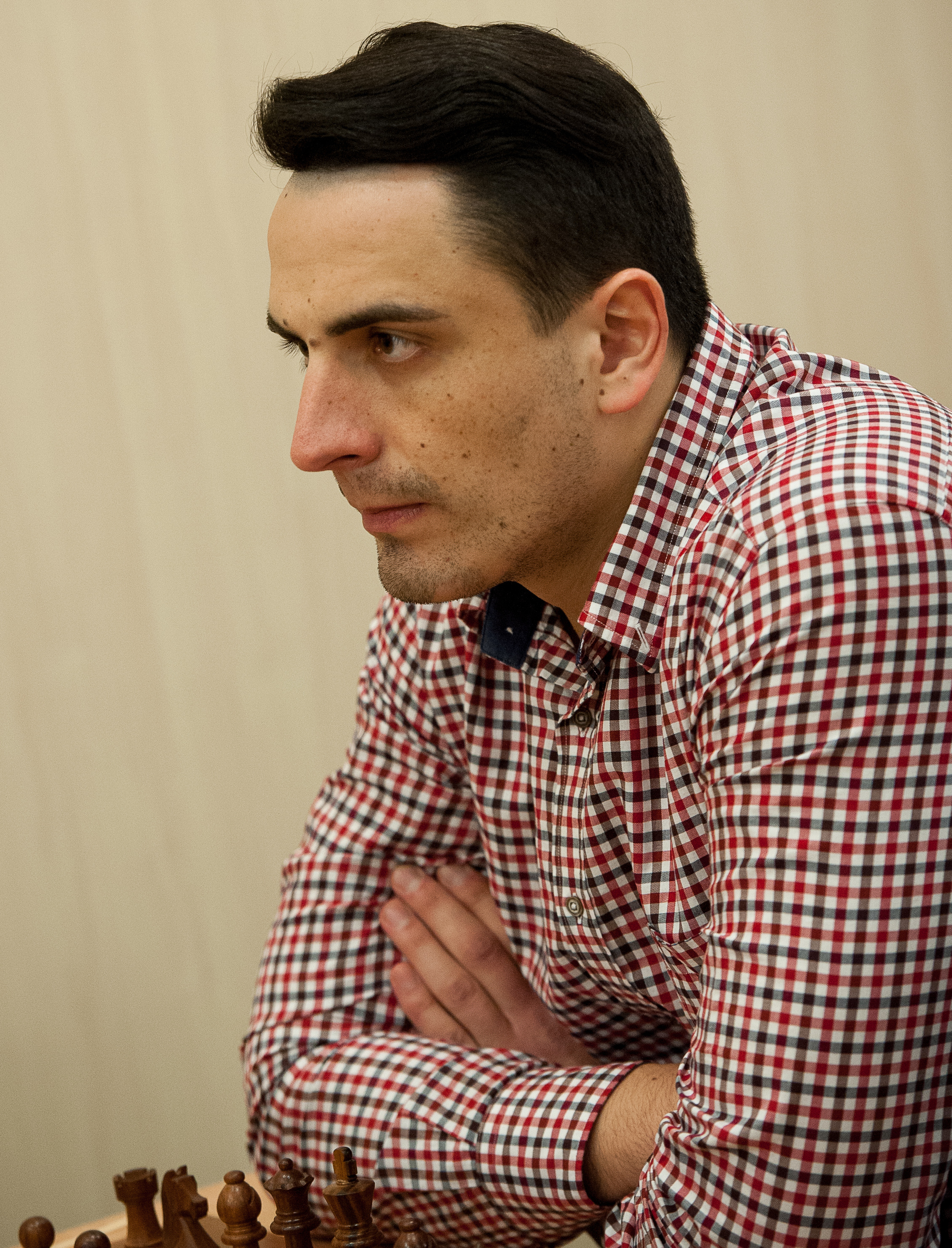
- Zinchenko in 2016

Personal information
- Born: February 14, 1987 (age 39) Dnipro, Soviet Union

Chess career
- Country: Ukraine
- Title: Grandmaster (2006)
- FIDE rating: 2540 (July 2026)
- Peak rating: 2548 (August 2017)

Yaroslav Zinchenko (born February 14, 1987) is a Ukrainian chess grandmaster. He gained his title in 2006 and in 2013 won the master's open in the 11th annual International Chess Festival. He lives in Dnipro and is currently inactive. He is a member of the Ukrainian Chess Federation.
