= Gennadij Ginsburg =

Ukrainian-German chess grandmaster (born 1971)

- Gennadij Ginsburg in Karlsruhe, 2019

Personal information
- Born: August 11, 1971 (age 55) Kommunarsk, Soviet Union

Chess career
- Country: Soviet Union (until 1991); Ukraine (1992–1994); Germany (since 1995)
- Title: Grandmaster (2006)
- FIDE rating: 2408 (November 2026)
- Peak rating: 2537 (July 2009)

Gennadij Ginsburg (Russian: Геннадий Изяславович Гинзбург; Ukrainian: Геннадій Гінзбург; born 11 August 1971) is a German chess Grandmaster of Ukrainian origin. He transferred from the Ukrainian Chess Federation to the German Chess Federation in 1994.

== Career ==
Born in Kommunarsk (now Alchevsk), Ginsburg was trained while still in Ukraine by Grandmaster Gennady Kuzmin. He runs a chess academy together with his wife, who teaches art and art history. Ginsburg won or placed near the top in several tournaments: 1st place at the Heinerfestpokal Open in Darmstadt (1994), tied for 1st–2nd at the Open in Mannheim (1995), 1st at the Hessian Individual Championship in Hofheim am Taunus (1995), tied for 1st–3rd at the Balagne Open in Calvi (2004), and tied for 1st–4th at the Open in Giessen (2005).

Ginsburg has held the title of International Master since 1994. He was awarded the Grandmaster title in September 2006, having achieved the required norms at the 13th Open in Cappelle-la-Grande in February 1997, at the 8th Open in Bad Zwesten in January 2004, and during the 2005–06 season of the 2. Bundesliga West.

In club chess, he has played in Germany primarily for SV 1920 Hofheim (mostly in the 2. Schachbundesliga, though also in the first-tier Schachbundesliga from 2003 to 2005 and 2017 to 2019), except during the 2009–10 season when he played in the 1. Bundesliga for SK Heidelberg-Handschuhsheim. In Belgium, he played for Schachfreunde Wirtzfeld, winning the Belgian Team Championship in 2009, and in Luxembourg for De Sprénger Echternach, with whom he won the Luxembourg Team Championship in 2015, 2016, 2018, and 2019.
