= Radosław Jedynak =

Polish chess grandmaster

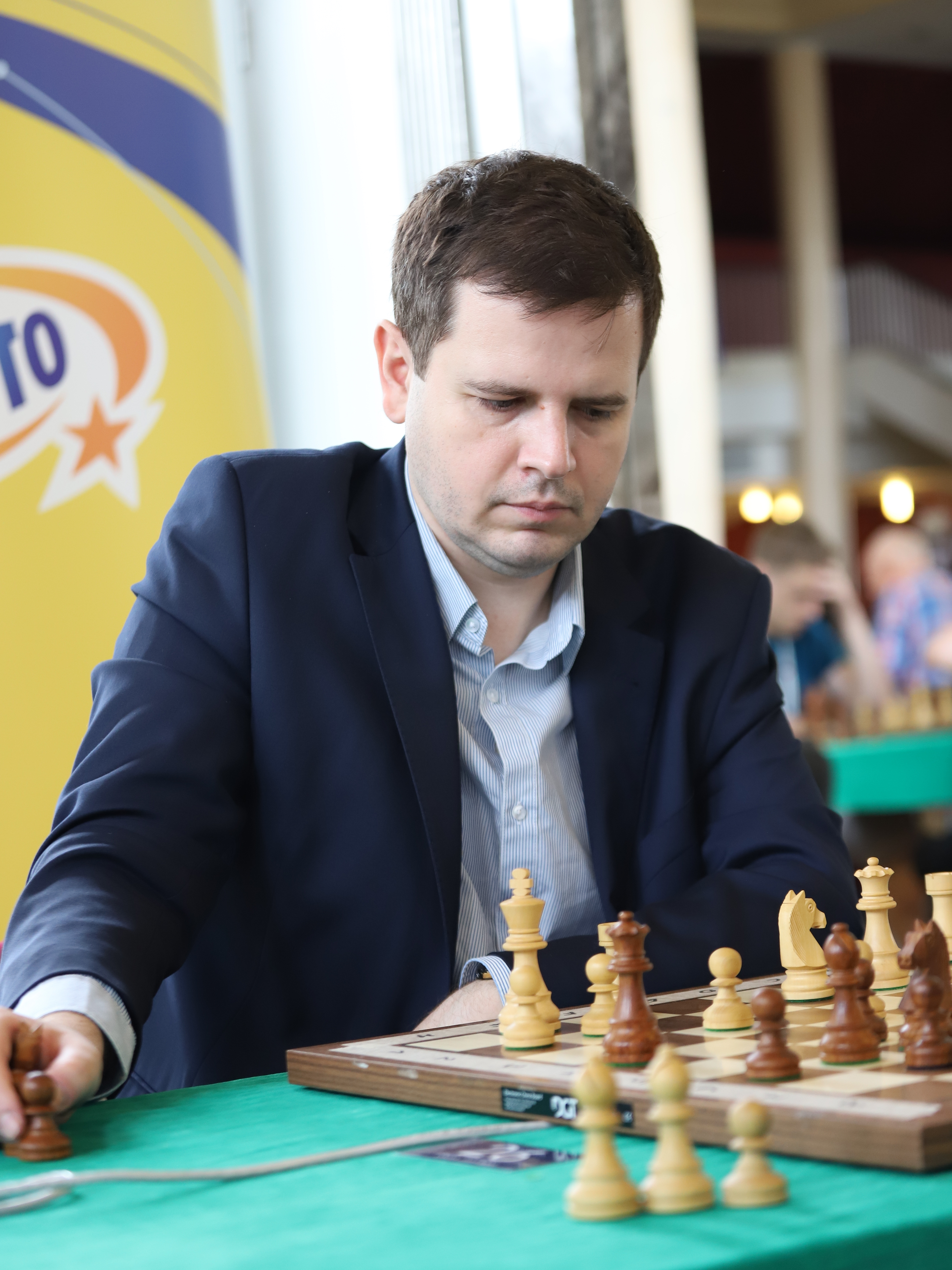
- Jedynak in 2021

Personal information
- Born: 9 June 1982 (age 44) Warsaw, Poland

Chess career
- Country: Poland
- Title: Grandmaster (2006)
- Peak rating: 2559 (October 2006)

Radosław Jedynak (born 9 June 1982) is a Polish chess Grandmaster (2006) and President of Polish Chess Federation.

== Chess career ==
Jedynak is a multiple medalist of the Polish Junior Chess Championship: gold in 1994 (U12), silver in 1993 (U12), bronze in 1996 (U14). In 1994, he participated at the World Junior Chess Championship (U12), in which shared third place together with the later FIDE World Chess Champion Ruslan Ponomariov. From 1999 to 2005, education interrupted Jedynak's participation in chess tournaments. In 2005, he returned to the chess tournament's and soon completed Grandmaster title norm. He won outright or shared first place in the following international events: Znojmo (2002), Jarnołtówek (2003), Leutersdorf (2006), Marcy-l'Étoile (2006), Montpellier (2006), Deizisau (2007), Oberwart (2007), Málaga Open (2008), Rewal (2009) and Karpacz (2012).

Jedynak has also competed successfully in several Polish Team Chess Championships (team bronze in 2003, individual silver in 2008) and Czech Chess Extraliga tournaments (team bronze in 2007, 2012).

== Personal life ==
In 2005, Jedynak graduated from the Faculty of Journalism and Political Science University of Warsaw.
