= Levan Aroshidze =

Georgian chess grandmaster

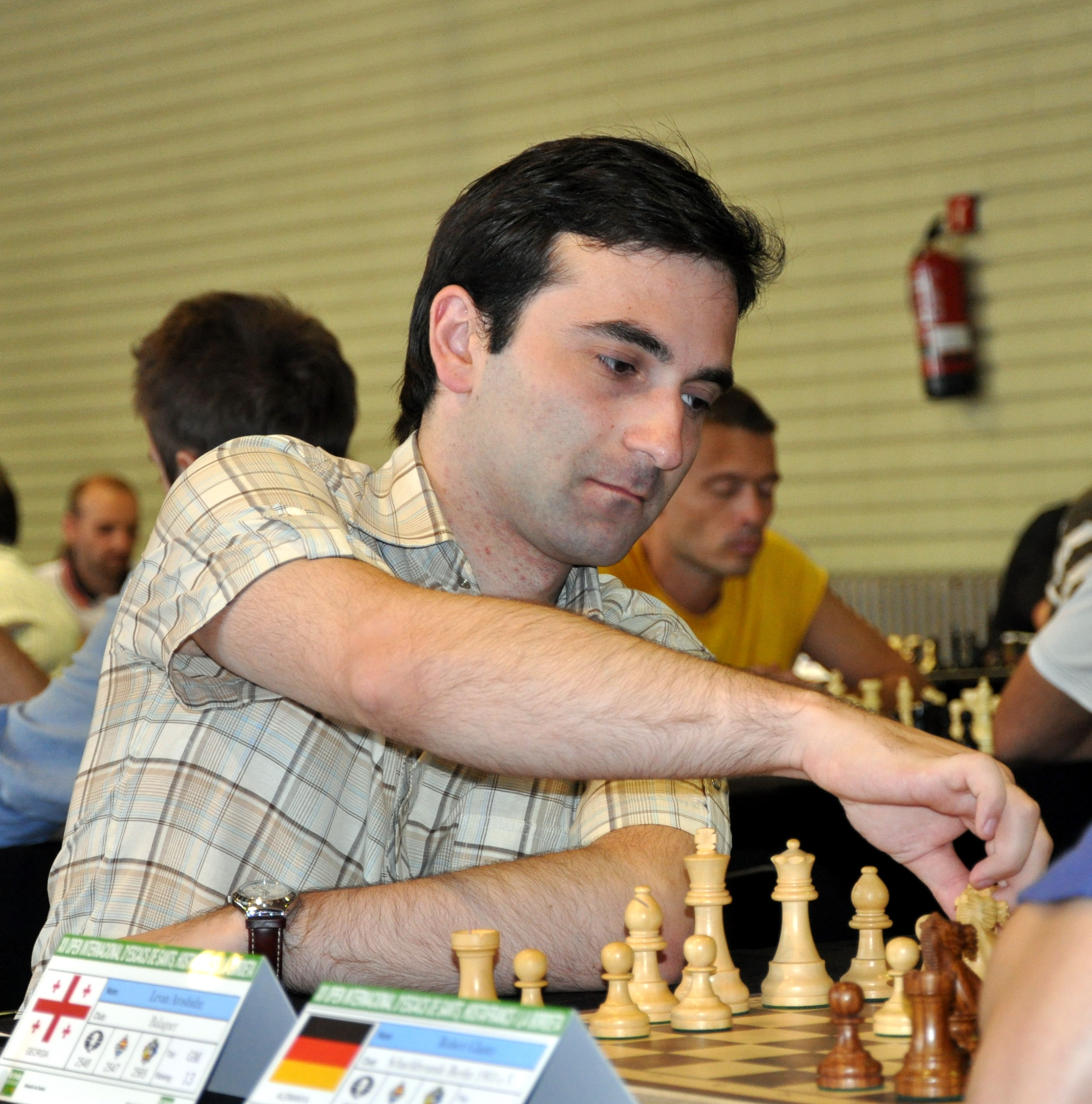

Personal information
- Born: July 9, 1985 (age 41) Tbilisi, Georgian SSR, Soviet Union

Chess career
- Country: Georgia
- Title: Grandmaster (2006)
- FIDE rating: 2521 (July 2026)
- Peak rating: 2582 (May 2012)

Levan Aroshidze (born July 9, 1985) is a Georgian chess grandmaster. In 1995, he became World under 10 champion at the age of nine. He won the 13th Obert Internacional d’Escacs Ciutat d’Olot tournament in Olot, Spain with 7.5/8 in joint first with Jorge Gonzalez Rodriguez.

Levan Aroshidze has two children: George Aroshidze and one other.

== Sample game ==
Sokolov vs. Aroshidze, Barcelona 2012

Position: f2 white king, e2 white rook, a2 white pawn, g3 white knight, c3 black rook, b3 white pawn, h4 white pawn, f4 white rook, f5 white pawn, e5 black rook, d5 black bishop, f6 black pawn, g7 black pawn, f7 black king, b7 black pawn, a7 black pawn

Position before 43...Rxg3!

Ivan Sokolov vs. Levan Aroshidze in the Casino Barcelona Masters 2012.

1. d4 Nf6 2. c4 e6 3. Nc3 Bb4 4. e3 O-O 5. Bd3 d5 6. cxd5 exd5 7. Nge2 Re8 8. Bd2 Bd6 9. Rc1 c6 10. O-O Ng4 11. g3 Nf6 12. f3 Nbd7 13. g4 c5 14. Qe1 cxd4 15. exd4 Nb6 16. Qh4 h6 17. b3 Bd7 18. Kh1 Nh7 19. Qf2 Ng5 20. Kg2 Ne6 21. f4 Bc6 22. g5 Ba3 23. Rcd1 Nc5 24. Bb1 Ne4 25. Bxe4 dxe4 26. Be3 Qd6 27. gxh6 Qxh6 28. f5 Qh5 29. d5 Bd7 30. Ng3 Qg4 31. h3 Qh4 32. Rd4 Bc5 33. Rxe4 Bxe3 34. Rxh4 Bxf2 35. Rxf2 Nxd5 36. Nxd5 Bc6 37. Kf1 Bxd5 38. Rg4 Rac8 39. Rd2 Re5 40. Kf2 Rc3 41. Rf4 f6 42. h4 Kf7 43. Re2 Rxg3 0-1
