= Evgeniya Doluhanova =

Ukrainian chess player (born 1984)

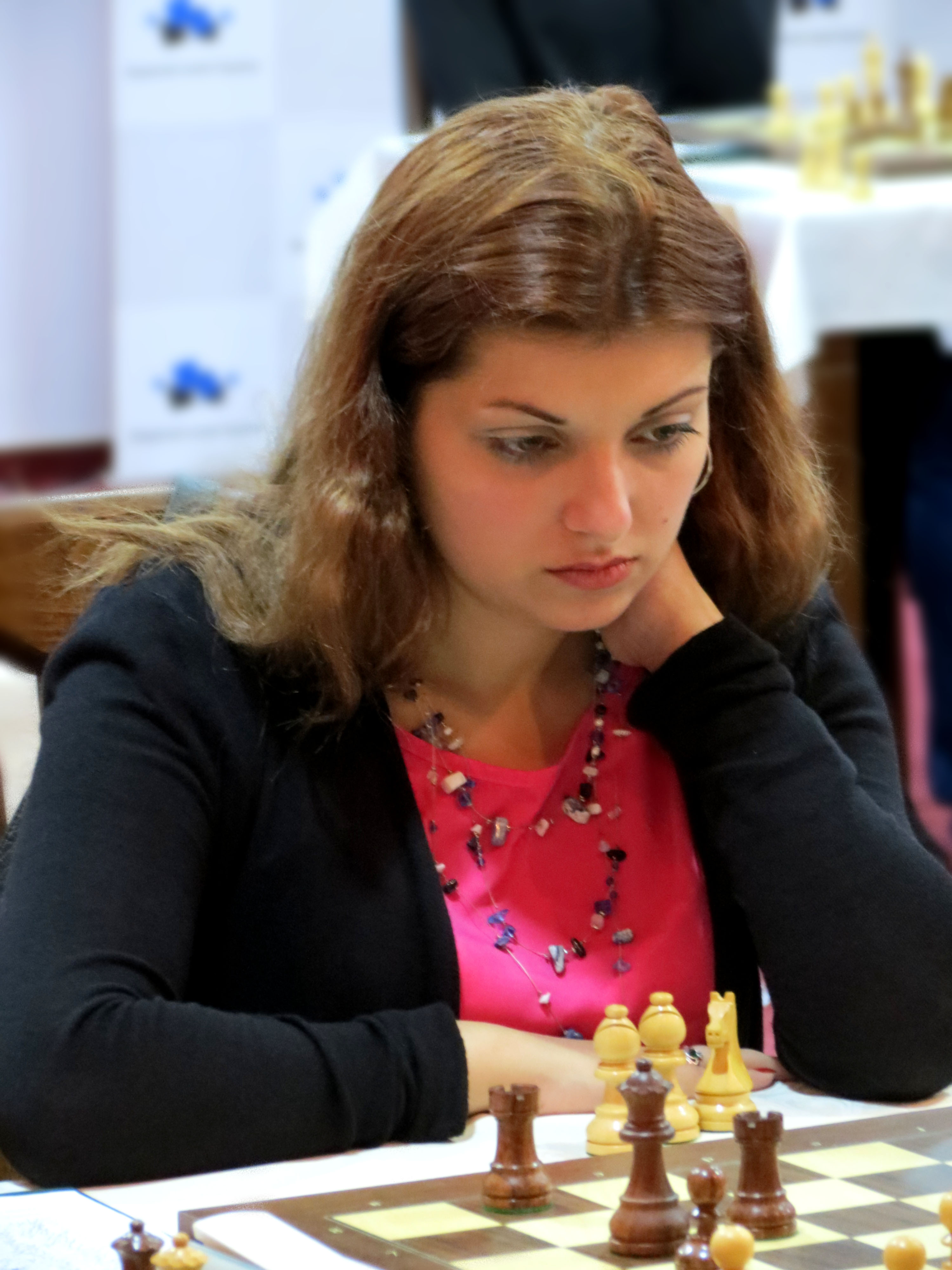
- Doluhanova in 2014

Personal information
- Full name: Evgeniya Grigorivna Doluhanova
- Born: 10 June 1984 (age 42) Baku, Azerbaijan

Chess career
- Country: Armenia (until 2013); Ukraine (since 2013)
- Title: Woman Grandmaster (2006)
- Peak rating: 2367 (December 2018)

Evgeniya Grigorivna Doluhanova (Ukrainian: Євгенія Григорівна Долуханова; born 10 June 1984) is a Ukrainian chess player who holds the FIDE title of Woman Grandmaster (WGM, 2006). From 2011 to 2013 represented Armenia.

== Chess career ==
In 2004 in Alushta won bronze medal in the Ukrainian women's chess championship. In 2009 in Yevpatoria she won the Ukrainian women's chess championship.

In 2005 in Kharkiv took 2nd place in the international women's chess tournament Femida 2005 (the tournament was won by Oksana Vozovic). In 2007, she took 2nd place in the Kharkiv Rector Cup. In 2009 in Suzdal she won Elisaveta Bykova memorial and in Kharkiv, she won the international women's chess tournament Kaissa 2009. In 2011 in Saint Petersburg she took 2nd place in the Lyudmila Rudenko memorial (the tournament was won Aleksandra Goryachkina). In 2012 in Jakarta she took 3rd place in the international women's chess tournament Japfa Chess Festival. In 2014, she won the international women's chess tournament in Sautron. In 2017, she took second place in the Maria Albulet Memorial in Braila.

In 2003, she was awarded the FIDE Woman International Master (WIM) title and received the FIDE Woman Grandmaster (WGM) title three years later.
