= Tatiana Dornbusch =

Ukraine-French chess player

Personal information
- Born: 21 November 1982 (age 43) Chernigov, Ukraine

Chess career
- Country: Ukraine; France; Monaco
- Title: Woman Grandmaster (2006)
- FIDE rating: 2251 (December 2021)
- Peak rating: 2349 (January 2013)

Tatiana Dornbusch (née Kostiuk, born 21 November 1982) is a Ukraine-born French chess player who received the FIDE title of Woman Grandmaster (WGM) in 2006.

== Biography ==
Born in Chernigov, Ukraine, Tatiana studied management in hotel, resort and tourism at the National Municipal Academy in Kharkiv, where she gained a master's degree in 2006.

== Chess career ==
Kostiuk enjoyed placings at local and national level in various age groupings from the age of ten, with moderate success in the European Chess Championships for youth. Following her fourth place in the under 18 European Championship of 1999, she obtained the FIDE title Woman International Master of chess. The following year, Kostiuk became the under 18 European Chess Champion, and in 2004 obtained the national title Woman Master of Ukraine in chess.

In 2006, Kostiuk won the Condom tournament in France and was awarded the FIDE Woman Grandmaster (WGM) title.

Kostiuk has participated in chess tournaments for the Ukrainian Team in the Romanian, Russian and Cyprus Leagues. In 2008, she won the Open tournament in Vladimir, Russia. In the 2009 Championship of Paris Open A, she placed 2–7 in the general tournament and first for women.

She was trained at the chess club of Kiev, under Kosikov A. I. and from 2011 is currently trained by Ukrainian grand-master Sergey Fedorchuk. She installed in France, married Philippe Dornbusch and plays for Vincennes Club, France. Tatiana Kostiuk is also involved in Chess & Strategy Website as Community Manager. Her Elo Fide rating in May 2013 is 2321 points, placing her at ninth rank of women chess players of Ukraine. From 2017, she changed chess federation for Monaco. Tatiana has been Monaco Woman Chess champion in 2018, 2019 and 2020 and she is ranked best female player in Monaco.

== FIDE ratings ==
Elo development
View chart definition.
