= Dornbusch Lighthouse =

Lighthouse in Mecklenburg-Western Pomerania, Germany

Dornbusch Lighthouse Leuchtturm Dornbusch
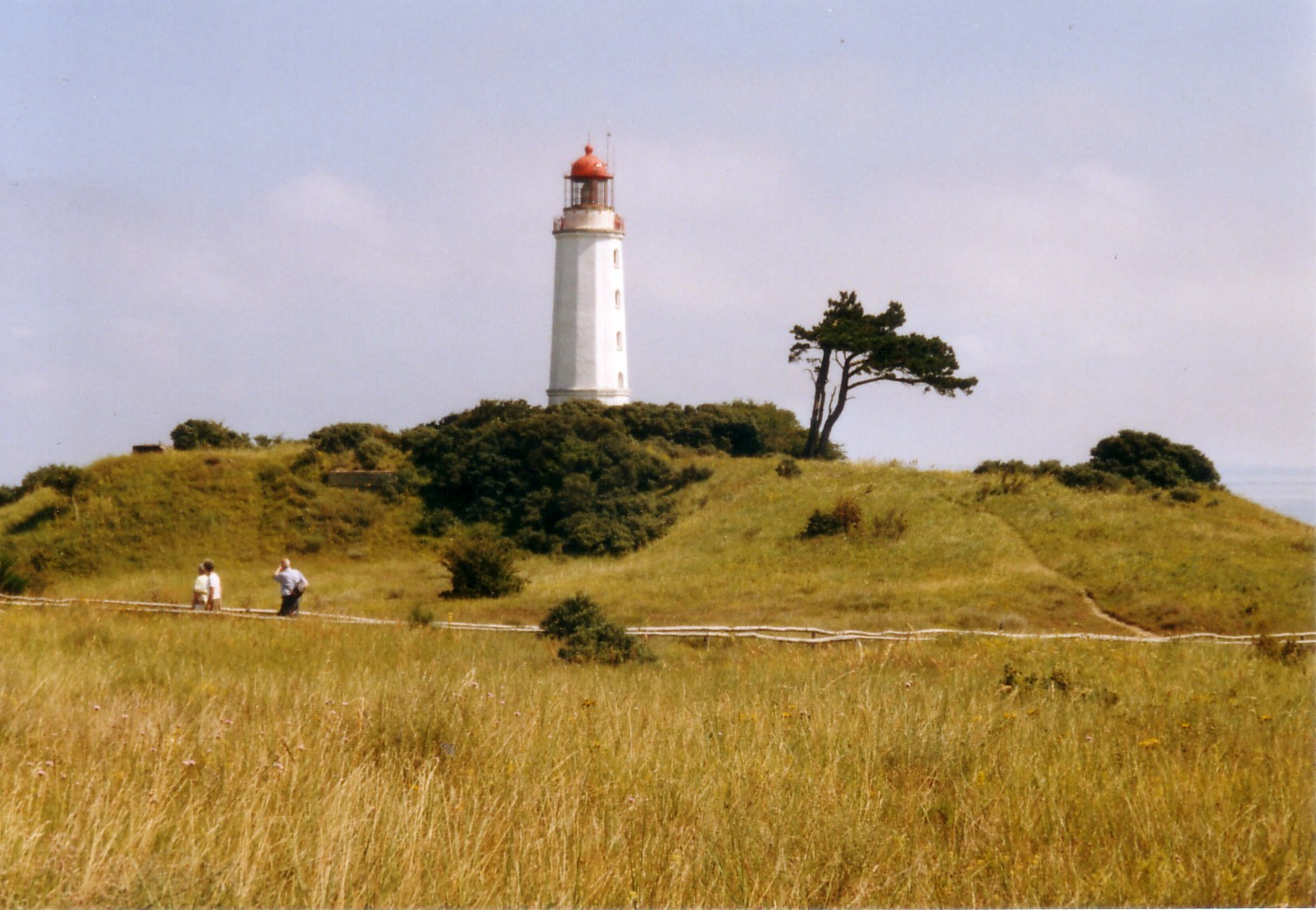
- Lighthouse on the Dornbusch
- Location: Hiddensee; Mecklenburg-Vorpommern; Baltic Sea
- Coordinates: 54°35′57″N 13°7′10″E

Tower
- Constructed: 1888
- Construction: Masonry tower
- Height: 28 metres (92 ft)
- Shape: Tapered octagonal tower with balcony and lantern
- Markings: White tower, red lantern and roof
- Operator: Nationalpark Vorpommersche Boddenlandschaft
- Heritage: architectural heritage monument in Mecklenburg-Vorpommern

Light
- Focal height: 95 metres (312 ft)
- Lens: Fresnel lenses, metal-halide lamp
- Intensity: 2 kW / 380 V
- Range: White: 24.9 nautical miles (46.1 km; 28.7 mi); Red: 21.3 nautical miles (39.4 km; 24.5 mi)
- Characteristic: Fl W R 10s. (2.4 s on, 7.6 s off)

Dornbusch Lighthouse (German: Leuchtturm Dornbusch) refers to the lighthouse officially designated as Leuchtfeuer Dornbusch/Hiddensee ("Dornbusch/Hiddensee Beacon") in the north of the German island of Hiddensee in Mecklenburg-Vorpommern on the Baltic Sea coast. Its international serial number is C 2588.

The lighthouse stands on the 72-metre-high Schluckswiek in the so-called Hochland ("highland") area of the island.

== Access ==
Since 1994 the lighthouse, with its 102 steps, has been open to the public. So that it does not become too crowded at the top, only 15 visitors may be admitted at any one time. Visitors must be at least six years old. When wind speeds reach Force 6 or higher, the tower is closed for safety reasons.

== Technical details ==
The lighthouse was built in 1887/1888 of brick construction. It was taken into service on 19 November 1888. It was modified from 1927 to 1929 and fitted with a reinforced-concrete shell. It is 28 metres high and has a focal height of 95 metres above mean sea level in the Baltic Sea. The observation gallery is located at a height of 20 metres. Its light has the following ranges: white 24.9 nautical miles (45 kilometres) and red 21.3 nautical miles (38 kilometres). Its characteristic is Flashing White Red, 2.4 seconds on, 7.6 seconds off. Its light source is a metal-halide lamp. The Stralsund Waterway and Shipping Office has responsible for the servicing and maintenance of the tower since 1990.

== Postage stamps ==
The first postage stamp that depicted Dornbusch Lighthouse appeared on 13 May 1975 and was issued by the Deutsche Post (GDR). The stamp belong to the series "Lighthouses, beacons, sector and breakwater lights" (Leuchttürme, Leit- Leucht- und Molenfeuer). It was designed by Jochen Bertholdt.

On 2 July 2009, the Deutsche Post issued a special postage stamp with a picture of Dornbusch Lighthouse to the value of 55 eurocents in the series "Lighthouses" (Leuchttürme). The design was of the indicia was by Professor Johannes Graf from Dortmund.

== See also ==
- List of lighthouses in Germany

== Gallery ==
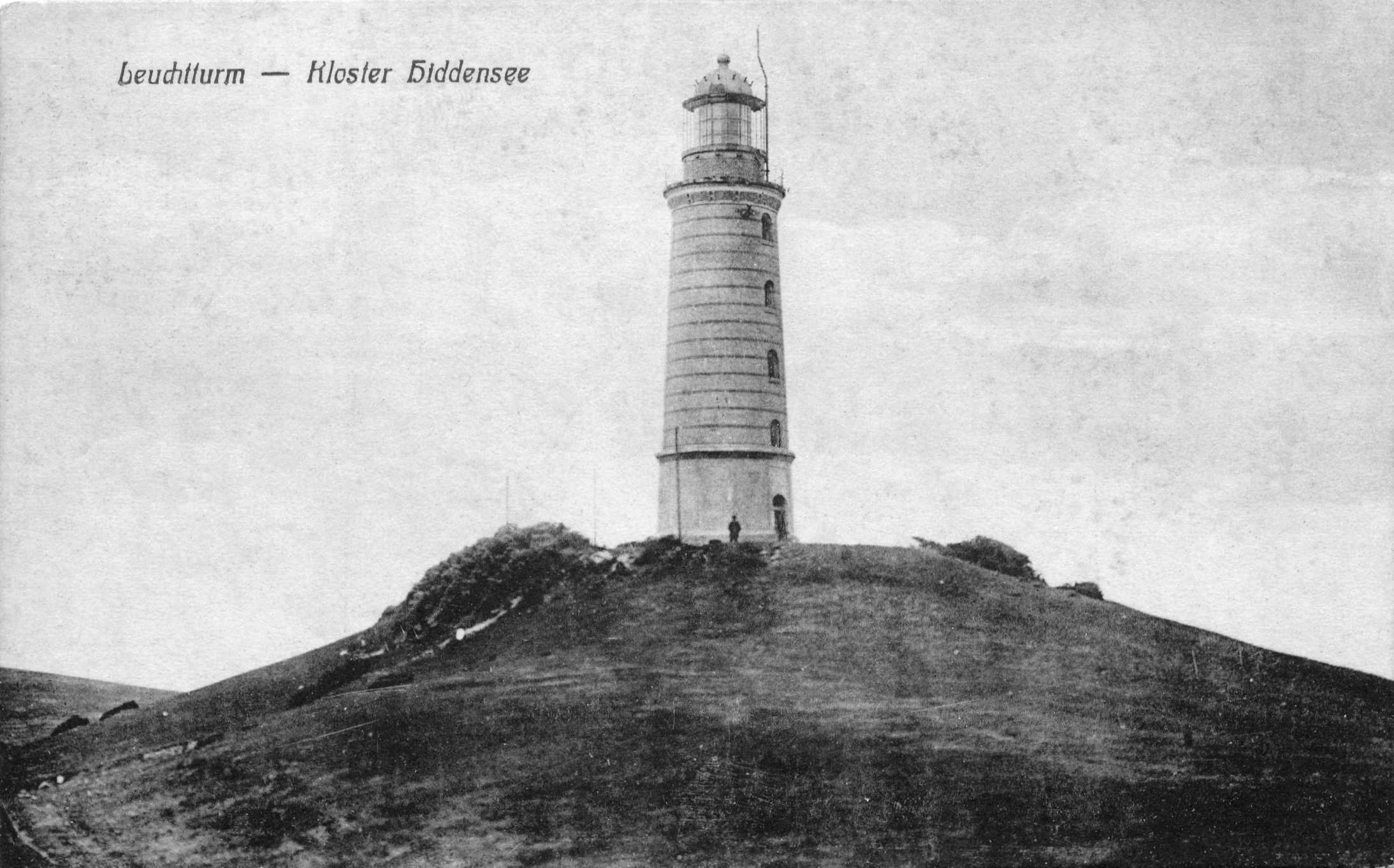
Dornbusch Lighthouse around 1917

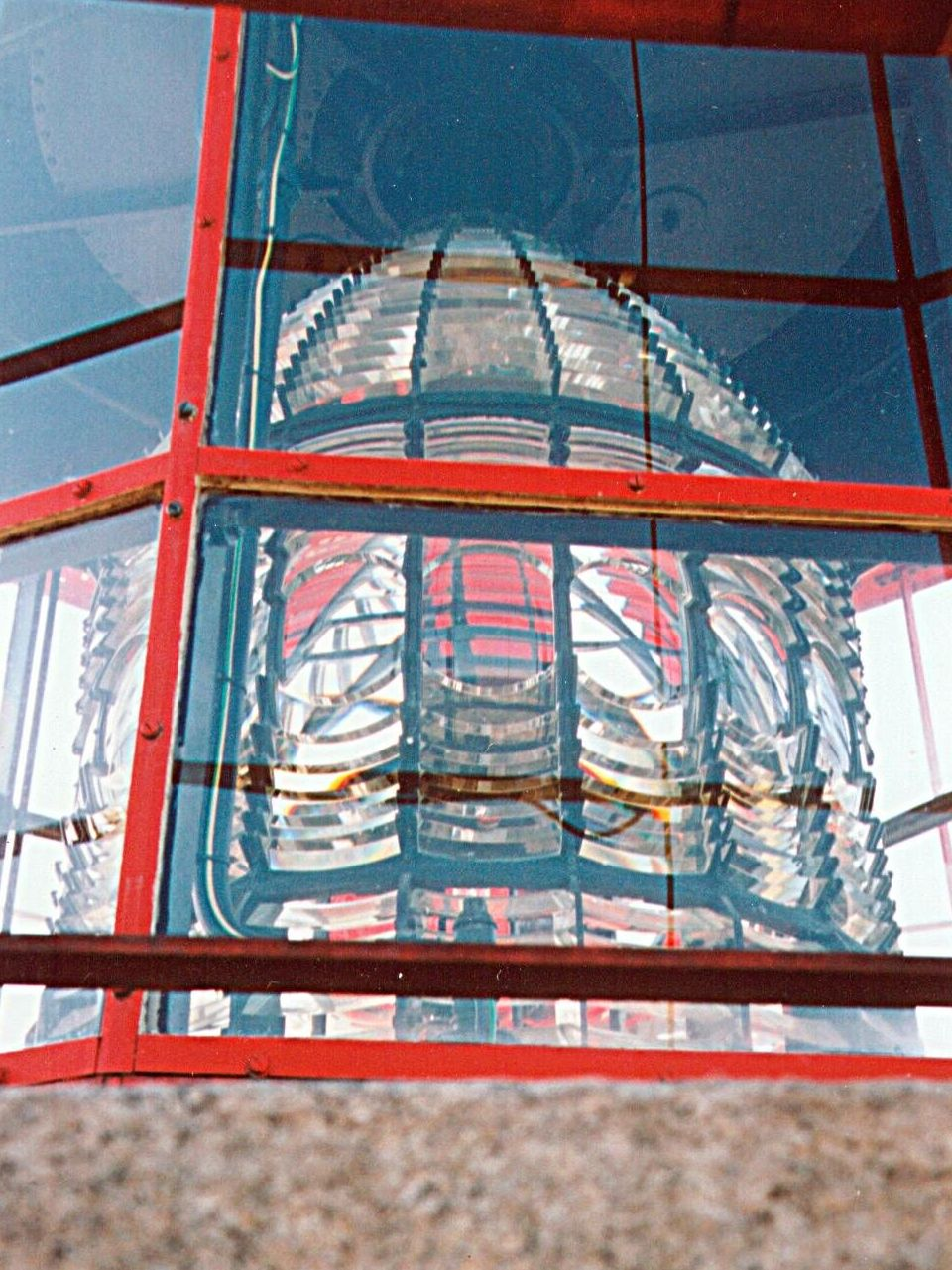
Fresnel lenses of the lighthouse from outside

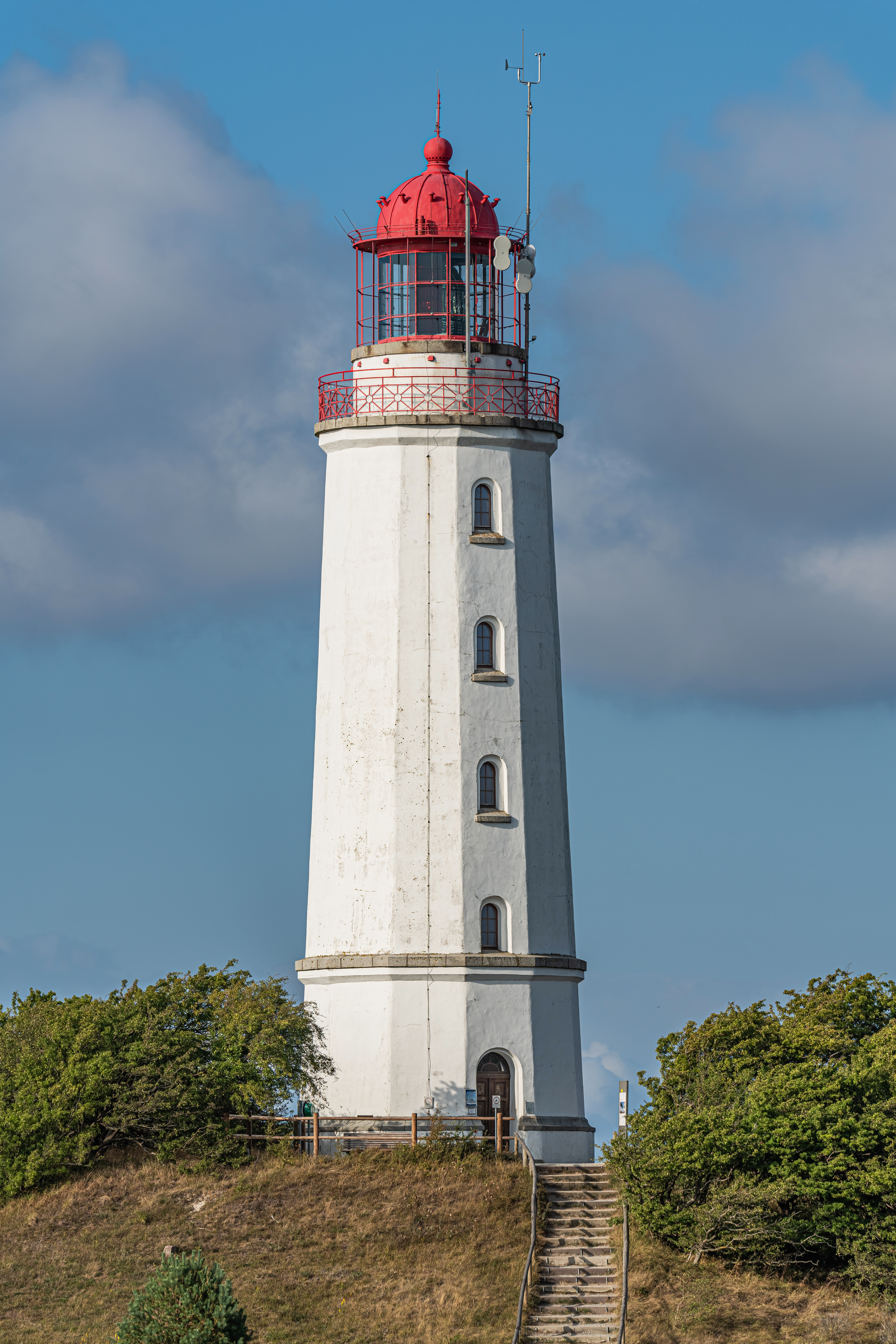
Dornbusch Lighthouse in 2022
