= Emil Josef Diemer =

German chess player

Emil Joseph Diemer
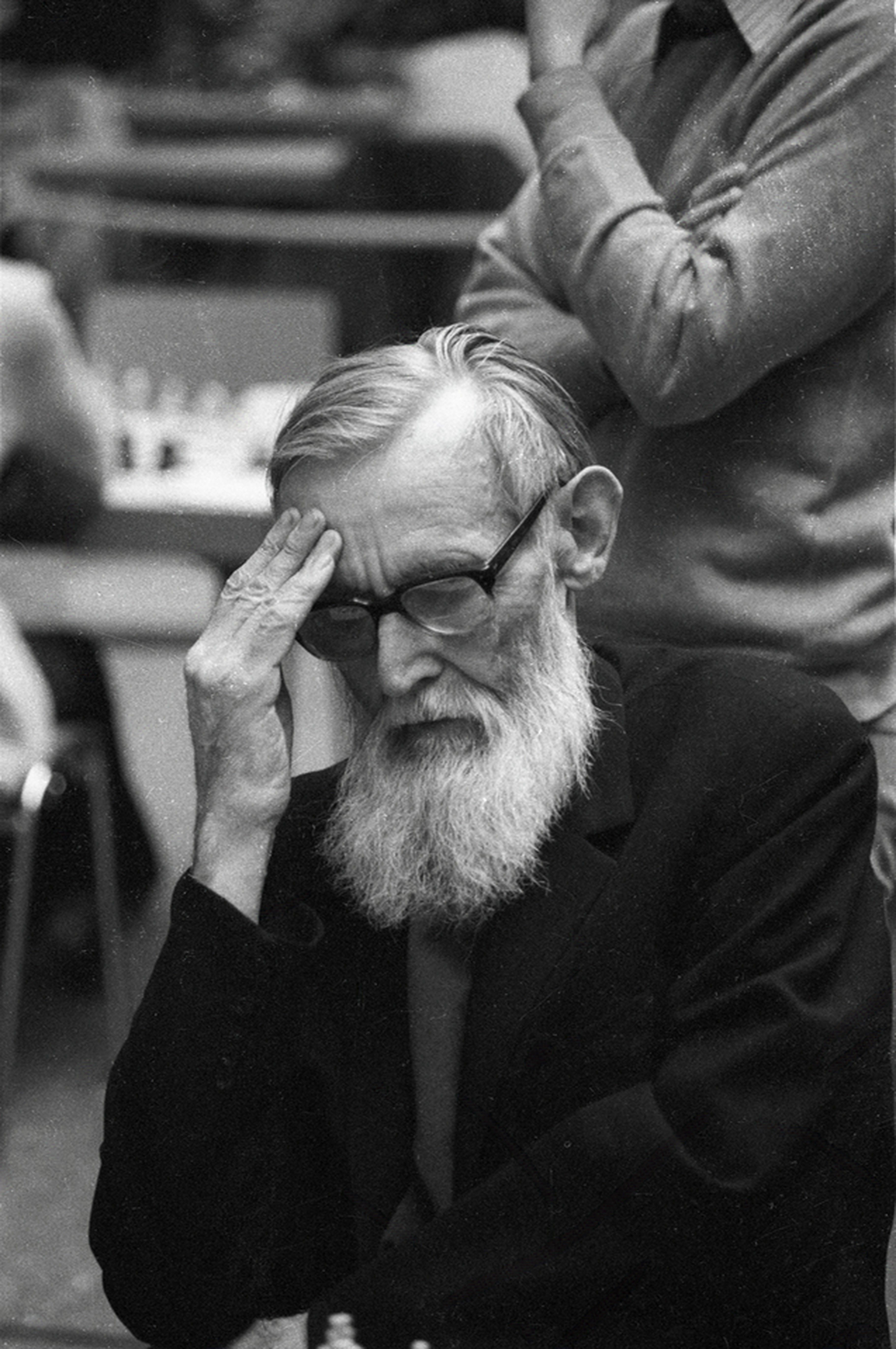
- Emil Joseph Diemer

Personal information
- Born: 1908 Radolfzell, German Empire
- Died: 1990 (aged 81–82) Fussbach/Gengenbach, Germany

Chess career
- Country: Nazi Germany, West Germany

Emil Joseph (Josef) Diemer (15 May 1908, in Radolfzell – 10 October 1990, in Fussbach/Gengenbach) was a German chess master.

== Biography ==
In 1908, Emil Joseph Diemer was born in the German town of Radolfzell, in Baden.

In 1931, Diemer was out of work and joined the German Nazi Party, where he became an active member. He was present at all important international chess events, and became the "chess reporter of the Great German Reich". His articles often appeared in Nazi publications.

In 1942–1943, Diemer played correspondence and tournament games with Klaus Junge.

After the war ended in 1945, Diemer continued his chess journalism, sold chess books, and gave simuls, but the stigma of his Nazi past made it difficult to support himself in this way. As a middle-tier master, his successes in chess were few.

In 1953, Diemer was expelled from the German Chess Federation, whose officials he had accused, in a press campaign, of "homosexuality and corruption of innocent youth".

It was not until 1956, in the Netherlands, that Diemer finally enjoyed real success, winning the Reserves Group of the Hoogovens tournament and later the Open Championship of the Netherlands.

After 1956, Diemer became less interested in chess, and increasingly interested in Nostradamus, the 16th-century French clairvoyant: he claimed to have cracked Nostradamus's secret code, and over 25 years is said to have mailed over 10,000 letters on the subject.

In 1965, Diemer was committed to a psychiatric clinic in Gengenbach. The clinic's director, believing that chess was excessively stressful for Diemer, banned him from playing the game. In 1971, however, this ban was rescinded, and Diemer's membership in the German Chess Federation was also reinstated. Diemer then played first board as a member of a German chess club team. Still lacking financial independence, however, he continued to reside in Gengenbach as a semi-residential patient of the hospital until the end of his life.

In 1990, Diemer died in Gengenbach at the age of 82.

== Legacy ==
Diemer played many unorthodox openings, like the Diemer–Duhm Gambit (1.d4 d5 2.e4 e6 3.c4) and the Alapin–Diemer Gambit (1.d4 e6 2.e4 d5 3.Be3), but he is most famous for his refinements to an old idea by Armand Edward Blackmar (1. d4 d5 2. e4 dxe4 3. f3), commonly known as the Blackmar–Diemer Gambit (1. d4 d5 2. e4 dxe4 3. Nc3 Nf6 4. f3).

== See also ==
- Alapin–Diemer Gambit
- Blackmar–Diemer Gambit
- Diemer–Duhm Gambit

== Bibliography ==
- Georg Studier, Emil Josef Diemer. Ein Leben für das Schach im Spiegel der Zeiten, Manfred Maedler Verlag 1996 (Germany)
- Dany Senechaud, Emil J. Diemer, missionnaire des échecs acrobatiques, Poitiers 1997 (France), 2003 (3rd ed.)
