= Wolfgang Uhlmann =

German chess grandmaster (1935–2020)

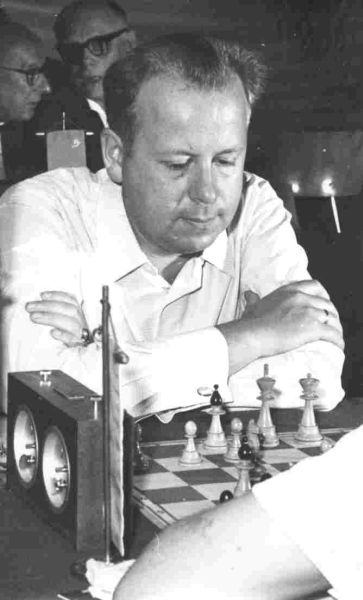
- Uhlmann in 1967

Personal information
- Born: 29 March 1935 Dresden, German Reich
- Died: 24 August 2020 (aged 85) Dresden, Germany

Chess career
- Country: East Germany
- Title: Grandmaster (1959)
- Peak rating: 2575 (January 1978)
- Peak ranking: No. 19 (January 1978)

Wolfgang Uhlmann (29 March 1935 – 24 August 2020) was a German chess grandmaster. He was East Germany's most successful chess player between the mid-1950s and the late 1980s, reaching the 1971 Candidates Tournament. During his career, Uhlmann played many of the top players of the time and won the East Germany Chess Championships 11 times. Uhlmann continued to play chess into his later years, before dying at the age of 85 in Dresden.

== Chess career ==
Wolfgang Uhlmann was born on 29 March 1935 in Dresden, Germany. His father, Alfred, a baker, taught him the game at the age of six but, at age sixteen, he contracted tuberculosis and spent one and a half years in a sanatorium, where he studied the game relentlessly. He emerged as a strong player, progressing to the title of German Youth Champion in 1951. He learned the trade of letterpress printing, but his career in chess prevented him from practicing it.

Uhlmann won the 1954, 1955 and 1958 East Germany Chess Championships, and in 1956 was awarded the International Master title, and later the Grandmaster title in 1959. He was the German Democratic Republic's (GDR) most outstanding player at the Chess Olympiads of 1956–1990, where he made 11 appearances, mostly on top board. At the 1964 event in Tel Aviv, Israel he scored a combined 15 points out of 18, earning him the individual board one gold medal. In the same year, he won his fourth national championship. An individual bronze medal, for a combined score of 13 points out of 18, followed in 1966 at Havana, Cuba.

In 1964, Uhlmann shared victory with Lev Polugaevsky at a tournament in Sarajevo and tied for first with former World Champion Vasily Smyslov at the Capablanca Memorial. He tied for first with Borislav Ivkov, and ahead of World Champion Tigran Petrosian) at Zagreb 1965, tied for first with Boris Spassky at Hastings 1965/66, tied for first with David Bronstein at Szombathely 1966, and tied for first with Bronstein at the Berlin Lasker Memorial in 1968. At Raach in 1969, a zonal tournament, he finished two points clear of a field which included Lajos Portisch, giving him access to the Palma de Mallorca Interzonal.

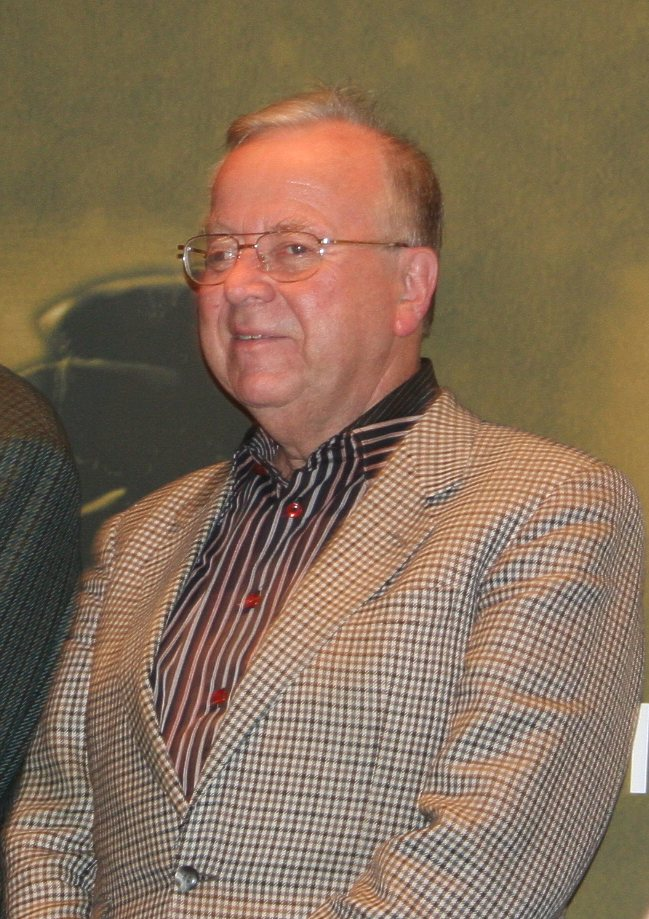
Uhlmann in 2005

His most successful attempt at World Championship qualification occurred at the Palma de Mallorca Interzonal of 1970, where he came sixth and reached the Candidates Matches the following year. But he lost his quarter-final match to Bent Larsen, 5½–3½. The match featured three games in the French Defense, Tarrasch Variation and Larsen playing the uncommon King's Fianchetto Opening. Uhlmann was not able to qualify for a Candidates Tournament again.

He also enjoyed some success in the 1970s and 1980s. He tied for first with Bronstein and Vlastimil Hort at Hastings 1975/76, placed second behind Anatoly Karpov at Skopje 1976, tied for first with Farago and Rainer Knaak at Halle 1978, and won Halle 1981 by a full point.

=== Old Hands ===
In 2012, aged 77, Uhlmann was a member of the "Old Hands" group of senior previous top players who played the "Snowdrops", a group of young woman masters, in a display match. The other Old Hands were Oleg Romanishin, Vlastimil Hort, and Friðrik Ólafsson, while the women were Tania Sachdev, Alina Kashlinskaya, Valentina Gunina, and Kristýna Havlíková. ChessBase described the round 8 game Kashlinskaya–Uhlmann as the most beautiful of the event, with Uhlmann's play evoking the style of the young Mikhail Tal.

== Death and legacy ==
Uhlmann died on 24 August 2020, in Dresden, where he had lived his entire life. He was 85, and had entered hospital following a fall; he had, however, been sick for much of his life from complications resulting from his childhood tuberculosis. He is survived by his widow, Christine, two children and two grandchildren.

Uhlmann was acknowledged as one of the world's leading experts on the French Defence, particularly the Winawer Variation, having refined and improved many of its variations and written the book Ein Leben lang Französisch (Winning with the French) on the opening. He is one of very few grandmasters to have deployed the French almost exclusively in reply to 1.e4.

== Example games ==
Bronstein vs. Uhlmann, 1977

Position: h1 white queen, f1 white bishop, e1 white king, c1 white bishop, b1 white rook, c2 white pawn, h3 white rook, c3 black pawn, a3 white pawn, h4 black knight, g4 black rook, f4 white pawn, e4 white knight, d4 black pawn, e5 white pawn, e6 black pawn, c6 black knight, h7 black rook, f7 black pawn, b7 black pawn, a7 black pawn, e8 black bishop, d8 black queen, c8 black king

Position after 23.Ne4

David Bronstein vs. Uhlmann, Tallinn 1977; French Defence, Winawer Variation (ECO C18)
1. e4 e6 2. d4 d5 3. Nc3 Bb4 4. e5 Ne7 5. a3 Bxc3+ 6. bxc3 c5 7. Qg4 Qc7 8. Qxg7 Rg8 9. Qxh7 cxd4 10. Ne2 Nbc6 11. f4 Bd7 12. Qd3 dxc3 13. h4 0-0-0 14. h5 Nf5 15. h6 Rg6 16. h7 Rh8 17. Rh3 (17.Rb1 f6 18.exf6 Be8 19.Qxc3 Rxh7 20.Rxh7 Qxh7 21.Rb3 [Vasiukov–Doroskevic, USSR 1967] d4! =/+ Ivkov) 17... d4! 18. Rb1 Be8 19. Qf3 Qd8 −/+ 20. g4 Nh4 21. Qh1 Rxg4 22. Ng3 Rxh7 23. Ne4 (diagram; "Black now sacrifices a piece to establish a fatal pin on the long light-square diagonal.") 23... Nxe5 24. fxe5 Bc6 25. Bd3 Kc7 26. Kf2 Rh5 27. Rf3 Qg8 28. Bf4 Nxf3 29. Qxh5 Rxf4 30. Qh6 Ng5+ 0–1
