= Battle of Pasewalk =

1760 battle

- Part of the Pomeranian War (Seven Years' War)
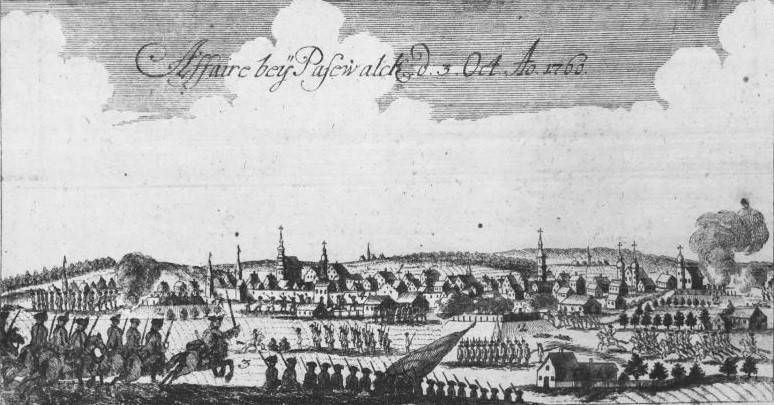
- Copper engraving of the battle, by Ben Joachai
Date	3 October 1760
Location	Pasewalk, Germany
Result	Swedish victory

Belligerents
Sweden	Prussia

Commanders and leaders
(Sweden) Augustin Ehrensvärd	(Kingdom of Prussia) Paul von Werner

Strength
1,700 men	4,200 men

Casualties and losses
500 killed, wounded and captured	300 killed and wounded

The Battle of Pasewalk was a battle at Pasewalk of the Seven Years' War between Swedish and Prussian forces fought on October 3, 1760.

The Prussian force of 4,200 men under Paul von Werner were attempting to seize Pasewalk where a Swedish force of 1,700 men under Augustin Ehrensvärd were stationed. After two failed attacks on the town and several skirmishes outside, the Prussian force, after seven hours of fighting, retreated as the night approached.

Casualties on both sides were severe, as Sweden had suffered 500 men in losses, many of them captured by Prussian troops taking the nearby redoubts. However, the Prussians suffered 300 men lost while attempting to storm the main Swedish army at Pasewalk.
