= Blackmar–Diemer Gambit =

Position: a8 black rook, b8 black knight, c8 black bishop, d8 black queen, e8 black king, f8 black bishop, g8 black knight, h8 black rook, a7 black pawn, b7 black pawn, c7 black pawn, e7 black pawn, f7 black pawn, g7 black pawn, h7 black pawn, d4 white pawn, e4 black pawn, c3 white knight, a2 white pawn, b2 white pawn, c2 white pawn, f2 white pawn, g2 white pawn, h2 white pawn, a1 white rook, c1 white bishop, d1 white queen, e1 white king, f1 white bishop, g1 white knight, h1 white rook
- Moves: 1.d4 d5 2.e4 dxe4 3.Nc3
- ECO: D00
- Named after: Armand Blackmar; Emil Josef Diemer
- Parent: Closed Game
- Synonym: BDG

The Blackmar–Diemer Gambit (or BDG) is a chess opening characterized by the moves:

1. d4 d5
2. e4 dxe4
3. Nc3

White intends to follow up with f3, usually on the fourth move. White obtains a tempo and a half-open f-file in return for a pawn, and as with most gambits, White aims to achieve rapid development and active posting of their pieces in order to rapidly build up an attack at the cost of the gambit pawn. It is one of the few gambits available to White after 1.d4. The gambit can also be reached from the Scandinavian Defense (1.e4 d5) if White plays 2.d4.

== History ==
The Blackmar–Diemer Gambit arose as a development of the earlier Blackmar Gambit, named after Armand Blackmar, a relatively little-known New Orleans player of the late 19th century who popularized its characteristic moves (1.d4 d5 2.e4 dxe4 3.f3) and was the first player to publish analysis of the opening.

The popularity of the original Blackmar Gambit, however, was short lived, as it was basically unsound, allowing Black to secure a superior position after White's immediate 3.f3 with 3...e5!. In 1889, Ignatz von Popiel came up with the idea of 3.Nc3, although his main idea was to meet 3...Nf6 with 4.Bg5 (rather than the more usual 4.f3). He also provided analysis of the Lemberger Countergambit (3.Nc3 e5), which was common at the time.

The evolved, modern form of this gambit owes much to the German master Emil Josef Diemer (1908–1990), who popularized the continuation 3.Nc3 Nf6 and then 4.f3 (when 4...e5? is ineffective as 5.dxe5 hits Black's knight, and after 5...Qxd1+ 6.Kxd1 the knight has to retreat to d7 or g8). The position resulting after 3... Nf6 4.f3 reflects the main line of the gambit accepted, although other Black responses on move three are possible. After many years of analysis, Diemer wrote a book on the opening in the late 1950s, titled Vom Ersten Zug An Auf Matt! (Toward Mate From The First Move!), with most of the published analysis devoted to the Ryder Gambit (and associated Halosar Trap), a double-pawn sacrifice characterized by the moves 4...exf3 5.Qxf3.

== Assessment ==
This gambit is considered an aggressive opening, but its soundness continues to be the subject of much debate both on and off the chessboard. Dismissed by many masters on the one hand, and embraced enthusiastically by many amateurs on the other, many consider that Black has good chances of defending successfully and converting the extra pawn in the endgame, while theory suggests that Black has many ways to equalize. As a result, this opening is almost never seen in top-level play, but enjoys a certain popularity among club players. Some titled players, including International Master Gary Lane, consider the opening to be suitable at the club level and for young and improving players. In one of his Keybooks, the Rev Tim Sawyer said, "Stop playing for the endgame, play to end the game! Be a winner. Play the Blackmar–Diemer Gambit!" On the other hand, Sam Collins (in his book Understanding the Chess Openings) noted the tendency for some Blackmar–Diemer fanatics to try to get the opening in every game, thus limiting their chess experience, and concluded, "Nobody who plays good chess plays this line, and nobody who plays good chess ever will." Other dismissive quotes include "playing the Blackmar–Diemer Gambit is like shopping for a tombstone" (Andrew Martin) and "To convince an adherent of the BDG that it is unsound, is like trying to convince a child that there is no Santa Claus." (Kevin Denny). As a result of the intense controversy surrounding the opening, much of the literature on the opening is lacking in objectivity.

GM Boris Avrukh has written that the gambit "may not be fully correct" but cautioned that he "was surprised at just how potent White's initiative could become". Although he was unable to fully refute the gambit and considered that Black faced a non-trivial defensive task, he felt that with correct play Black could emerge with good chances. GM Joe Gallagher wrote that he had "noticed a common trend among Blackmar–Diemer analysts; once there is no attack and the position looks rather balanced they tend to assess the game as =, forgetting the fact that they are a pawn down." Gallagher thought that the closely related Hübsch Gambit gave an equal game but that the Blackmar–Diemer provided "not really enough compensation" and there were "a number of areas where Black could fight for the advantage." Nevertheless, he cautioned that Black "inaccuracies can be swiftly punished" in the Blackmar–Diemer. IM John Cox wrote that the gambit was "objectively weak" but pragmatically recommended that Black should enter the Hübsch gambit instead of accepting the Blackmar–Diemer as "sod's law dictates that [the reader would meet the gambit] in the third Saturday game of a weekender, when few of us are at our sharpest tactically ... one slip sees you getting torched." IM Willy Hendriks notes that the main lines of the Blackmar–Diemer (1.d4 d5 2.e4 dxe4 3.Nc3 Nf6 4.f3 exf3 5.Nxf3) and the King's Gambit (1.e4 e5 2.f4 exf4 3.Nf3) have the same engine evaluation, and philosophically wonders whether the two might have swapped places in an alternative history.

== Main line: 3...Nf6 4.f3 exf3 5.Nxf3 ==
Position: a8 black rook, b8 black knight, c8 black bishop, d8 black queen, e8 black king, f8 black bishop, h8 black rook, a7 black pawn, b7 black pawn, c7 black pawn, e7 black pawn, f7 black pawn, g7 black pawn, h7 black pawn, f6 black knight, d4 white pawn, c3 white knight, f3 white knight, a2 white pawn, b2 white pawn, c2 white pawn, g2 white pawn, h2 white pawn, a1 white rook, c1 white bishop, d1 white queen, e1 white king, f1 white bishop, h1 white rook

3...Nf6 4.f3 exf3 5.Nxf3

After 1.d4 d5 2.e4 dxe4 3.Nc3 Nf6 4.f3 exf3 5.Nxf3, Black has five main options: 5...Bf5, 5...Bg4, 5...e6, 5...g6, and 5...c6.

=== Gunderam Defence: 5...Bf5 ===
The line 5...Bf5 (along with most of the ...c6/...Bf5 defences for Black in general) was extensively analysed by Gerhart Gunderam, who published his analysis in a book Blackmar–Diemer Gambit in 1984. The main response for White is 6.Ne5, intending to attack the black bishop with an advance of the kingside pawns and, if appropriate, weaken Black's kingside pawn structure with Ne5xBg6. Black can respond with 6...e6, when after 7.g4, 7...Be4 leads to tremendous complications, e.g. after 8.Nxe4 Nxe4 9.Qf3 Qxd4 10.Qxf7+ Kd8 11.Qf4. More common is 7...Bg6, which leads to quieter play, when White's best response is probably 8.Bg2 c6 9.h4, with a sustained kingside initiative in return for the pawn. However, Black also has the option 6...c6 intending 7.g4 Be6, when White has to play accurately to prove enough compensation for the pawn after 8.g5 Nd5 or 8.Bc4 Nd5 9.Qe2 Nd7. White has an alternative in 6.Bd3, directly challenging the bishop, but Christoph Scheerer doubts that White gets enough compensation after 6...Bxd3 7.Qxd3 c6 intending ...e6, ...Nbd7, ...Be7 and ...0-0 with a solid position.

=== Teichmann Defence: 5...Bg4 ===
The move 5...Bg4 pins the knight on f3, often with the intention of swapping it off and undermining White's central control. White's best response is to attack the bishop immediately with 6.h3, when play often continues 6...Bxf3 7.Qxf3 c6 (but not 7...Nc6, when 8.Bb5 is good for White). In this position, White can defend the attacked d-pawn with 8.Qf2 (the Ciesielski Variation), but this allows Black an easy game by preparing ...e7–e5, e.g. after 8...Nbd7 9.Bd3 e5. Alternatively, 8.Be3 is the Classical Variation, where White aims for a slow buildup to a kingside offensive. White's other main alternative is 8.g4!?, the Seidel–Hall Attack, where White is happy to sacrifice the d-pawn in order to gain an increased initiative on the kingside, e.g. after 8...Qxd4 9.Be3 Qe5 10.0-0-0 e6 11.g5. Black can decline the pawn, e.g. after 8...e6 9.g5 Nd5 10.Bd3, leading to sharp play. Alternatively, after 6.h3, Black can retreat the bishop with 6...Bh5 7.g4 Bg6 8.Ne5, a line which often transposes to the Gunderam Defence line 5...Bf5 6.Ne5 e6 7.g4 Bg6 after a subsequent h3–h4, as White's extra tempo with h3 is not particularly useful.

=== Euwe Defence: 5...e6 ===
The 5...e6 line, analysed by Max Euwe, aims to reach a French Defence type position, but with Black having an extra pawn. Play usually continues 6.Bg5 Be7, when White's most popular option is 7.Bd3. Black can attack the centre immediately with 7...c5!? here, as recommended by Joe Gallagher and James Rizzitano. Play can continue 8.dxc5 Qa5 9.0-0 Qxc5+ 10.Kh1, when White has to play accurately to prove compensation for the pawn. Alternatively 7...Nc6 can be considered the main line of this variation, when 8.0-0 Nxd4 9.Kh1 is the notorious Zilbermints Gambit, sacrificing a second pawn in order to increase White's initiative. The Zilbermints Gambit has scored well in practice, but objectively it probably does not give White enough compensation for two pawns. However, the alternative 8.a3, despite the loss of time, offers White good compensation for the pawn, and White can also consider 8.Qd2, allowing the trade of the bishop on d3 but avoiding any loss of time. White's main alternative to 7.Bd3 is 7.Qd2, aiming to castle queenside and giving additional support to the d4-pawn, while aiming to launch a kingside offensive with Qd2–f4 and meeting ...h6 with a dangerous Bxh6 sacrifice. Play can continue 7...0-0 8.0-0-0 (8.Bd3 c5! is better for Black) 8...c5 9.Qf4!? cxd4 10.Rxd4 or 7...h6 8.Bh4 (8.Bf4 is also possible, aiming to keep the Bxh6 sacrifice possibility open, but allowing 8...Bb4 9.Bc4 Ne4) 8...Ne4 9.Nxe4 Bxh4+ 10.g3 Be7 11.Bg2, when White has some compensation for the pawn but the final verdict on the resulting positions is still yet to be reached.

=== Bogoljubov Defence: 5...g6 ===
The Bogoljubov Defence was played by Diemer himself in a game against Bogoljubov. By fianchettoing the king's bishop Black aims to gain increased pressure against the d4-pawn following a subsequent ...c5. White's most common response is the Studier Attack, 6.Bc4 Bg7 7.0-0 0-0 8.Qe1, intending Qh4, Bh6 and piling pressure on the kingside, sacrificing pawns at d4 and c2 if appropriate. However, after Peter Leisebein's 8...Nc6 9.Qh4 Bg4!, it is doubtful if White obtains enough compensation for the pawn against accurate play. An alternative approach is to castle queenside, play Bh6 and then launch the h-pawn against the black kingside. The best way to carry out this approach is via 6.Bf4, as 6.Bg5 (as played by Bogoljubov in his game against Diemer) is well met by 6...Bg7 7.Qd2 0-0 8.0-0-0 c5!, when Black stands better. If Black tries the same approach against 6.Bf4, i.e. 6...Bg7 7.Qd2 0-0 8.0-0-0 c5, then 9.d5 a6 10.d6! gives White good chances.

=== Ziegler Defence: 5...c6 ===
Black's most critical response to the Blackmar–Diemer Gambit is 5...c6, known as the Ziegler Defence due to Diemer's tendency to name lines after opponents that first played them against him, but most of the theory of the line was established by Gerhart Gunderam, who advocated 5...Bf5. Most modern authors recommend this as Black's antidote to the BDG, sometimes via O'Kelly's move order 4...c6. The old main line runs 6.Bc4 Bf5 7.0-0 e6 8.Ne5, when Black should avoid 8...Bxc2?! 9.Nxf7!, but instead play 8...Bg6!, when White ends up with very little to show for the lost pawn. More dangerous for Black is 8.Ng5, the Alchemy Variation, where Black has to be careful not to fall for various sacrifices on e6 and f7, but White probably does not get enough compensation for the pawn after 8...Bg6 9.Ne2 Bd6. German FIDE master Stefan Bücker regards Black as clearly better after 10.Nf4 Bxf4 11.Bxf4 0-0, but Christoph Scheerer believes that White can generate attacking chances with 12.c3 h6 13.Qg4!?. In view of White's problems proving compensation in these lines, ChessCafe.com reviewer Carsten Hansen concluded, "despite all the smoke and mirrors, the Blackmar–Diemer Gambit still isn't viable beyond club-level or rapid-play games". However, Lev Gutman proposed the alternative 7.Bg5 e6 8.Nh4!? Bg6 9.Nxg6 hxg6 10.Qd3, intending to castle queenside and tie Black down to the f7-pawn, promising long-term positional compensation for the pawn. There are currently insufficient practical tests to determine whether it amounts to enough compensation for the lost pawn. Black cannot easily deviate from this line, since after 7...Nbd7 White continues 8.Qe2 e6 9.0-0-0, aiming to launch a strong attack down the e- and f-files, and if 9...Bb4 then 10.d5!. If White tries to enter this setup after 7...e6 8.Qe2, however, then 8...Bb4! prevents White from safely castling queenside, leaving White with insufficient compensation for the pawn. White also has the dangerous, though probably objectively insufficient, second pawn sacrifice 7.g4, analysed extensively by Stefan Bücker. In the 5...c6 move order White has the alternative 6.Bd3, usually intending to sacrifice a second pawn after 6...Bg4 7.h3 Bxf3 8.Qxf3 Qxd4, leading to sharp complications, though Black can transpose back to the Classical Variation of the Teichmann Defence with 8...e6, since White's only good response is 9.Be3. Black can prevent this 6.Bd3 possibility by using O'Kelly's move order 4...c6.

== Ryder Gambit: 5.Qxf3 ==
Position: a8 black rook, b8 black knight, c8 black bishop, d8 black queen, e8 black king, f8 black bishop, h8 black rook, a7 black pawn, b7 black pawn, c7 black pawn, e7 black pawn, f7 black pawn, g7 black pawn, h7 black pawn, f6 black knight, d4 white pawn, c3 white knight, f3 white queen, a2 white pawn, b2 white pawn, c2 white pawn, g2 white pawn, h2 white pawn, a1 white rook, c1 white bishop, e1 white king, f1 white bishop, g1 white knight, h1 white rook

3...Nf6 4.f3 exf3 5.Qxf3

Alternatively, White can offer a second pawn with 5.Qxf3. Gary Lane argued in 2000 that White has serious problems proving enough compensation for the sacrificed pawns after 5...Qxd4 6.Be3 Qg4 7.Qf2 e5. Black can also decline the pawn with 5...c6 or 5...e6, holding the position.

The Halosar Trap (named after Hermann Halosar) follows after 6...Qb4 7.0-0-0 Bg4? 8.Nb5! threatening mate with 9.Nxc7#. The black queen cannot capture the knight because 8...Qxb5 9.Bxb5+ is check, gaining time for the white queen to escape the threat from the bishop. The line continues 8...Na6 9.Qxb7 Qe4 (Black lost in Diemer vs. Halosar, Baden-Baden 1934, after 9...Rc8 10.Qxa6) 10.Qxa6 Qxe3+ (worse is 10...Bxd1 11.Kxd1 Rd8+ 12.Bd2 and White is winning, for example 12...Ng4 13.Nxc7+ Kd7 14.Qxa7) 11.Kb1 Qc5 12 Nf3. Burgess wrote that "Although White has some advantage, Black has avoided instant loss."

== Black's fourth-move alternatives ==
=== O'Kelly Defence: 4...c6 ===
Many sources recommend the O'Kelly Defence as a means of transposing to the Ziegler Defence while cutting out White's 6.Bd3 possibility, since White has nothing better than 5.Bc4, when 5...exf3 6.Nxf3 Bf5 transposes directly to the 6.Bc4 Bf5 variation of the Ziegler Defence. Alternatively, 5.Nxe4 is likely to land White in an inferior version of the Fantasy Variation of the Caro–Kann Defence, with equality at best in positions that may not attract Blackmar–Diemer players, 5.fxe4 e5! is good for Black and other bishop moves allow Black to achieve superior versions of standard Blackmar–Diemer Gambit variations. 4...c6 also has some independent value, for example Evgeny Bareev used the continuation 5.f3 b5!? in a game against Nigel Short, achieving a superior position after 6.Bb3 Be6 7.fxe4 b4 8.Nce2 Nxe4, but 8.Na4!? improves for White and may give sufficient compensation for the pawn. Black can also try 5...Bf5, when White must play accurately to prove enough compensation, but probably obtains sufficient play after 6.g4 Bg6 7.g5 Nd5 8.fxe4 Nxc3 9.bxc3.

=== Vienna Defence: 4...Bf5 ===
The Vienna Defence was recommended by Matthias Wahls in his book Modernes Skandinavisch, where he saw it as a refutation of the Blackmar–Diemer Gambit. White can play for compensation for a pawn with 5.fxe4 Nxe4 6.Qf3, when both 6...Nxc3 and 6...Nd6 lead to complicated positions in which Black often tries to return a pawn on b7 in order to catch up on development, and in some cases secure a positional advantage. White often does best to continue with a gambit policy and simply continue developing. The main line runs 6...Nd6 7.Bf4 e6 8.0-0-0 c6 9.g4 Bg6 10.Qe3 Be7, when Black is solid, but White retains enough compensation for the pawn. Alternatively, 5.g4 aims to regain the pawn in most cases, e.g. after 5...Bg6 6.g5 Nd5 7.Nxe4 Nc6 8.Bb5 e6 9.Bxc6+ bxc6 10.Ne2 c5 11.dxc5 Nb4, when in a reversal of roles, White has an extra pawn but Black has the initiative and a superior pawn structure. White can use 5.g4 as a gambit option by continuing with 6.h4!?, which leads to sharp play and approximately equal chances.

=== Langeheinicke Defence: 4...e3 ===
The push with 4...e3 is often used by strong players to avoid the complications arising from 4...exf3 5.Nxf3, but it is one of Black's weaker options against the Blackmar–Diemer as returning the pawn in this way does not significantly slow down White's initiative, and thus Black struggles to fully equalize in this line. In most lines White must seek to place a knight on f4 (taking the sting out of ...Nd5) in order to secure an advantage.

=== Other lines ===
- 4...c5 is the Brombacher Countergambit, which can also be reached via 3...c5 4.d5 Nf6 5.f3. Play tends to continue 5.d5 exf3 6.Nxf3, a line also adopted by Efim Bogoljubow. Another possible line is 5.Bf4 cxd4 6.Nb5, well met by 6...Na6.
- 4...e5?! is the Elbert Countergambit, well met by 5.dxe5 Qxd1+ 6.Kxd1 Nfd7 7.Nd5 Kd8 8.Bg5 f6 9.exf6 gxf6 10.Nxf6 Be7 11.Nxe4. 5...Nfd7, 6...Ng8, and 10...h6 are not much better for Black.
- 4...e6 is the Weinsbach Defence, well met by 5.fxe4. Black may then attack the centre with 5...c5 or 5...e5, but most common is 5...Bb4. 6.a3 Bxc3+ 7.bxc3 transposes to a favorable line of the Winckelmann–Reimer Gambit (1.e4 e6 2.d4 d5 3.Nc3 Bb4 4.a3 Bxc3+ 5.bxc3 dxe4 6.f3) with 6...Nf6 7.fxe4. An alternative is 6.Bd3, where Black may reply with 6...Nxe4, as 7.Bxe4 allows a fork of the king and bishop with ...Qh5, better is 7.Ne2.
- 4...Nc6 is the Lamb Defence. White has the options of 5.d5 and the quieter 5.Bb5. After 5.d5, Black's most common reply is 5...Ne5 (5...Nb4 is playable but inferior). If White plays 6.Qd4, a trap is for Black to sacrifice the knight with 6...exf3, continuing 7.Qxd5 f2+, where 8.Kxf2 loses the queen to 8...Ng5+. Better is the line 6.fxe4 e6 7.Nf3, but Black still has good compensation.

== Von Popiel Gambit: 4.Bg5 ==
Position: a8 black rook, b8 black knight, c8 black bishop, d8 black queen, e8 black king, f8 black bishop, h8 black rook, a7 black pawn, b7 black pawn, c7 black pawn, e7 black pawn, f7 black pawn, g7 black pawn, h7 black pawn, f6 black knight, g5 white bishop, d4 white pawn, e4 black pawn, c3 white knight, a2 white pawn, b2 white pawn, c2 white pawn, f2 white pawn, g2 white pawn, h2 white pawn, a1 white rook, d1 white queen, e1 white king, f1 white bishop, g1 white knight, h1 white rook

3...Nf6 4.Bg5

4.Bg5 is an older idea played in 1889 by Ignatz von Popiel. The most common reply is 4...Bf5, adding a defender to the pawn. A common trap occurs after 5.Qe2 Qxd4? 6.Qb5+, forking Black's bishop, king, and b-pawn.

== Black's third-move alternatives ==
=== Lemberger Countergambit: 3...e5 ===
Position: a8 black rook, b8 black knight, c8 black bishop, d8 black queen, e8 black king, f8 black bishop, g8 black knight, h8 black rook, a7 black pawn, b7 black pawn, c7 black pawn, f7 black pawn, g7 black pawn, h7 black pawn, e5 black pawn, d4 white pawn, e4 black pawn, c3 white knight, a2 white pawn, b2 white pawn, c2 white pawn, f2 white pawn, g2 white pawn, h2 white pawn, a1 white rook, c1 white bishop, d1 white queen, e1 white king, f1 white bishop, g1 white knight, h1 white rook

3...e5

The Lemberger Countergambit is an important alternative, where Black counterattacks against the d4-pawn instead of defending the attacked e4-pawn. White can head for a drawish endgame with 4.dxe5, e.g. 4...Qxd1+ 5.Kxd1 Nc6 6.Nxe4 Nxe5, or 5.Nxd1 Nc6 6.Bf4, with equality and few winning chances for either side. Since these positions typically do not attract gambiteers, White often chooses a riskier response in order to generate winning chances, such as 4.Qh5, 4.Nge2 or 4.Nxe4. Both 4.Qh5 and 4.Nge2 are well met by 4...Nc6!, when Black has good chances of obtaining an advantage, while against 4.Nxe4 the most critical continuation is 4...Qxd4, when White can continue with either 5.Qe2 or 5.Bd3, with complications and some compensation for the pawn in either case, but it is unclear if it is enough.

=== Zeller Defence: 3...Bf5 ===
Position: a8 black rook, b8 black knight, d8 black queen, e8 black king, f8 black bishop, g8 black knight, h8 black rook, a7 black pawn, b7 black pawn, c7 black pawn, e7 black pawn, f7 black pawn, g7 black pawn, h7 black pawn, g6 black bishop, d4 white pawn, e4 black pawn, g4 white pawn, c3 white knight, a2 white pawn, b2 white pawn, c2 white pawn, e2 white queen, f2 white pawn, h2 white pawn, a1 white rook, c1 white bishop, e1 white king, f1 white bishop, g1 white knight, h1 white rook

3...Bf5 4.g4 Bg6 5.Qe2

3...Bf5, the Zeller Defence, is Black's most common third-move alternative. It can be met with 4.f3, and if 4...exf3 then 5.Qxf3 attacking the bishop; thus, Black may be better off transposing to the Vienna Defence with 4...Nf6. Black's usual next move is 5...Qc8, defending, where play tends to continue 6.Bc4 and then 6...Nf6 7.Bg5 or 6...e6 7.g4. Counterattacking with 5...Bxc2? is weak as 6.Qxb7 Nd7 7.Nb5 Rc8 8.Nxa7 gives White an excellent game.

4.g4 is White's main alternative. A new line mentioned in Tim Sawyer's Blackmar–Diemer series is the Torning Gambit which occurs after 4.g4 Bg6 5.Qe2. If Black gets greedy and captures 5...Qxd4, White gets a nice game after 6.Qb5+. Tim Sawyer's books mention several games played by Richard Torning who originally played this gambit in the 1980s. A trap is Richard Torning (1809) – amol52 (1424) [D00] (bullet 18.12.2016): 1.d4 d5 2.Nc3 Bf5 3.e4 dxe4 4.g4 Bg6 5.Qe2 Qxd4 6.Qb5+!? Qd7?? 7.Qxb7 Qc6 8.Qc8#. Gary Danelishen, author of The Final Theory of Chess, posted analysis of the Torning Variation online.

=== Netherlands Defence: 3...f5 ===
3...f5, the Netherlands Defence, is an important option for Black, since 4.f3 is well met by 4...e5!, with some advantage for Black. Instead White does better to prevent ...e5 with 4.Bf4, and then obtain compensation for a pawn with a subsequent f3. The name originated because it is can also be reached via the Dutch Defence via 1.d4 f5 2.Nc3 d5 3.e4 dxe4.

=== Other lines ===
Position: a8 black rook, b8 black knight, c8 black bishop, d8 black queen, e8 black king, f8 black bishop, h8 black rook, a7 black pawn, b7 black pawn, e7 black pawn, f7 black pawn, g7 black pawn, h7 black pawn, c6 black pawn, f6 black knight, c4 white bishop, d4 white pawn, e4 black pawn, c3 white knight, f3 white pawn, a2 white pawn, b2 white pawn, c2 white pawn, g2 white pawn, h2 white pawn, a1 white rook, c1 white bishop, d1 white queen, e1 white king, g1 white knight, h1 white rook

3...c6 4.Bc4 Nf6 5.f3
- 3...e6 transposes to the Rubinstein Variation of the French Defence, after which there is no sound way for White to force a Blackmar–Diemer Gambit type position (4.f3 Bb4 is very bad for White).
- 3...c6 transposes to the Caro–Kann Defence. White can continue with 4.f3 or 4.Bc4 intending 5.f3. The 4.f3 line was played by Philip Stuart Milner-Barry in 1932 and the 4.Bc4 line was played by Heinrich Von Hennig in 1920. Thus, both are older than Diemer's idea. 4.f3 may transpose to the Ziegler Defence after 4...exf3 or the O'Kelly Defence after 4...Nf6; 4.Bc4 often ends up transposing as well.
- 3...g6 is best met with 4.Nxe4, as 4.f3 Bg7 is annoying for White. Capturing the pawn both prevents ...c5 from Black and enables White to play c3, blunting Black's bishop.
- 3...b6 is not entirely without merit. Black can meet 4.f3 with 4...e5, where the best line seems to be 5.Be3 exd4, though 4...exf3 and 4...Bb7 are more common. The quieter 4.Nxe4, which tends to continue 4...Bb7 5.Bd3 (5.Bb5+ has also been recommended), seems more promising for White.
- 3...c5, typically continuing 4.d5, is a reversed Albin Countergambit where White has played the useful extra move of Nc3. After the usual 4...Nf6, common moves for White are 5.Nge2, 5.Bg5, 5.Bf4, and 5.f3, which transposes to the Brombacher Countergambit.
- 3...Nc6 transposes to a line of the Nimzowitsch Defence more often reached via 1.e4 Nc6 2.d4 d5 3.Nc3 dxe4. It is well met by 4.d5, preventing 4...Qxd4, which may be followed by 5.f3 or 5.f4.
- 3...Bd7 has the idea of 4.Nxe4 Bc6, a similar idea to the Fort Knox Variation of the French Defence.
- 3...e3 is an inferior method of returning the pawn. White may continue with either 4.Bxe3 or 4.fxe3.

== Black declines the gambit ==
Black can decline the gambit on the second move, typically with 2...e6 (transposing to the French Defence) or 2...c6 (transposing to the Caro–Kann Defence), or occasionally 2...Nc6 (transposing to the Nimzowitsch Defence), although doing so does not eliminate White's ability to offer alternative gambits. These transpositions can also be reached on the third move.

After 2...e6, White can offer the Diemer–Duhm Gambit (3.c4) or the Alapin–Diemer Gambit (3.Be3), which both often involve ...dxe4 from Black and f3 from White. Unlike after 2...e6, where White has more options than after 2...dxe4 3.Nc3 e6, 2...c6 offers little independent significance from 3...c6.

== See also ==
- List of chess openings
- List of chess openings named after people
