= Rainer Knaak =

German chess grandmaster (born 1953)

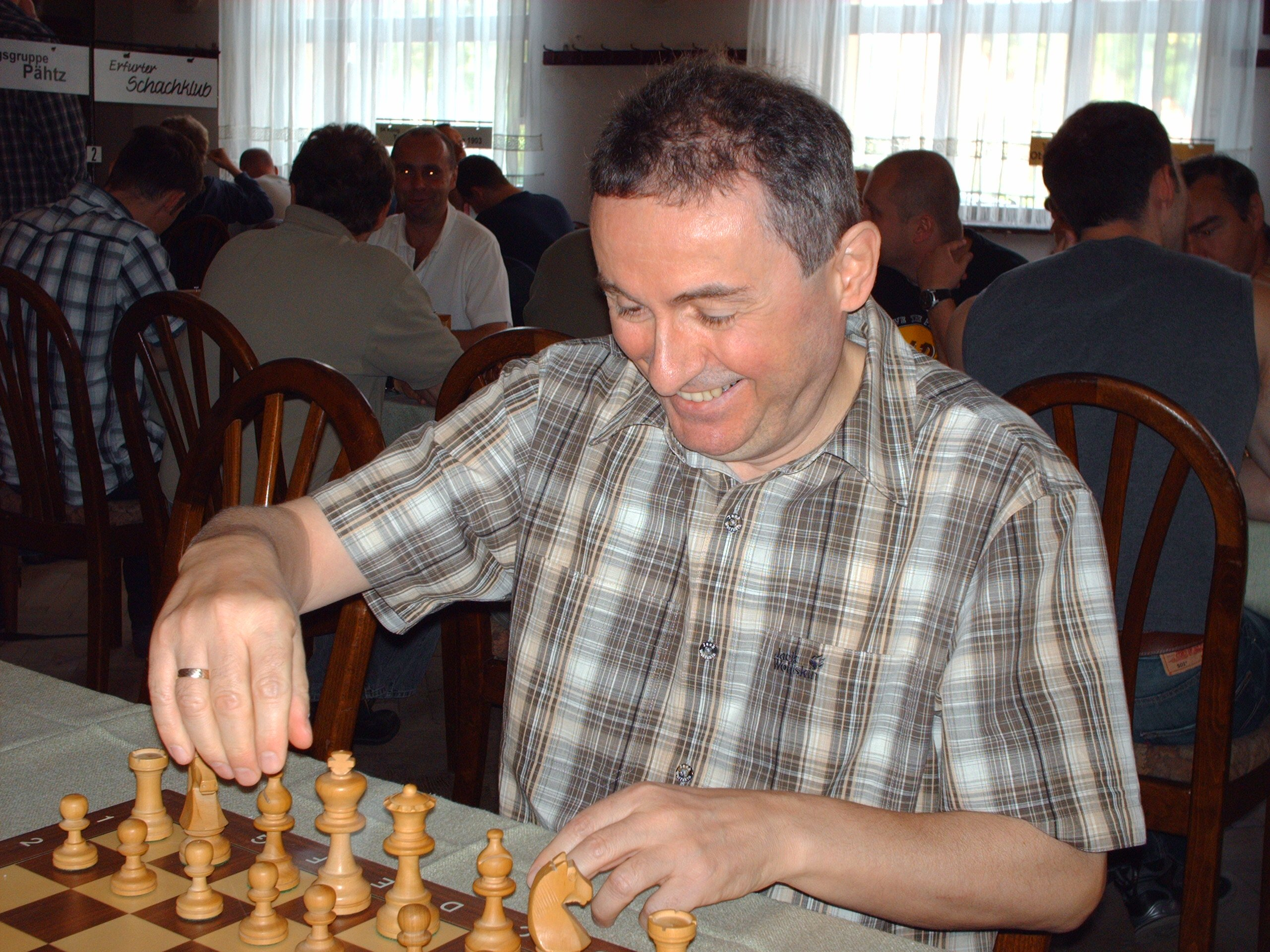
- Knaak in 2007

Personal information
- Born: Rainer Fritz Albert Knaak; 16 March 1953 (age 73) Pasewalk, East Germany

Chess career
- Country: Germany
- Title: Grandmaster (1975)
- Peak rating: 2565 (January 1979)
- Peak ranking: No. 24 (January 1979)

Rainer Fritz Albert Knaak (born 16 March 1953 in Pasewalk, Bezirk Neubrandenburg) is a German chess player who holds the FIDE title of Grandmaster (GM).

== Biography ==
He learned the game at the age of 5 from his father, Hans Knaak. Rapid progress brought him to the pinnacle of junior chess and in 1966, 1969 and 1970, he was crowned national junior champion in his age range. Further development led to him being awarded the International Master title in 1973 and the Grandmaster title in 1975. Meanwhile, in pursuit of a career, he took up a degree course in Mathematics in 1971 and followed this with a teaching diploma.

Prior to unification in 1990, Knaak represented East Germany (otherwise known as the German Democratic Republic) and enjoyed unbridled success in the national championship, taking the title in 1974, 1978, 1982, 1983 and 1984, while finishing a close runner-up in 1975. Throughout the seventies and eighties he rivalled Wolfgang Uhlmann as the nation's best player.

In team events, he played on the GDR's Chess Olympiad team at Skopje 1972, Thessaloniki 1988 and Novi Sad 1990. At the latter event, he delivered an impressive 68% score, including a win against the strong French GM Joël Lautier. He has also played league chess in the Chess Bundesliga, for Porz and Werder Bremen.

In international tournaments he has achieved first places at Olomouc 1972, Leipzig 1977 (shared with Malich and Smejkal), Halle 1978 (shared with Farago and Uhlmann) and Cienfuegos 1984. There were some notable outright second places too, at Halle 1974 (behind Tal), Bucharest 1975 and Trnava 1980 (behind Sturua). At Zinnowitz 1971, Sandomierz 1976 and Potsdam 1985, he shared second place, at Bucharest 1973 came third, and at Camagüey 1974, finished fourth.

Knaak has written a number of books and articles about chess, mostly for ChessBase's publishing wing, where he has been a full-time employee since 1994. Unlike most grandmaster offerings, his writing is not always confined to the mechanics of the game, but frequently delves into chess history, particularly relating to the famous tournaments and great champions of the past. His treatise on Paul Morphy, co-written with Karsten Müller, received a complimentary review from critic John Watson, who considered the work would turn out to be more factually accurate than much that had previously been written.

In his life outside of chess, he has been married since 1977 and has two children. His elder brother Jochen is also a chess player.

== Selected bibliography ==
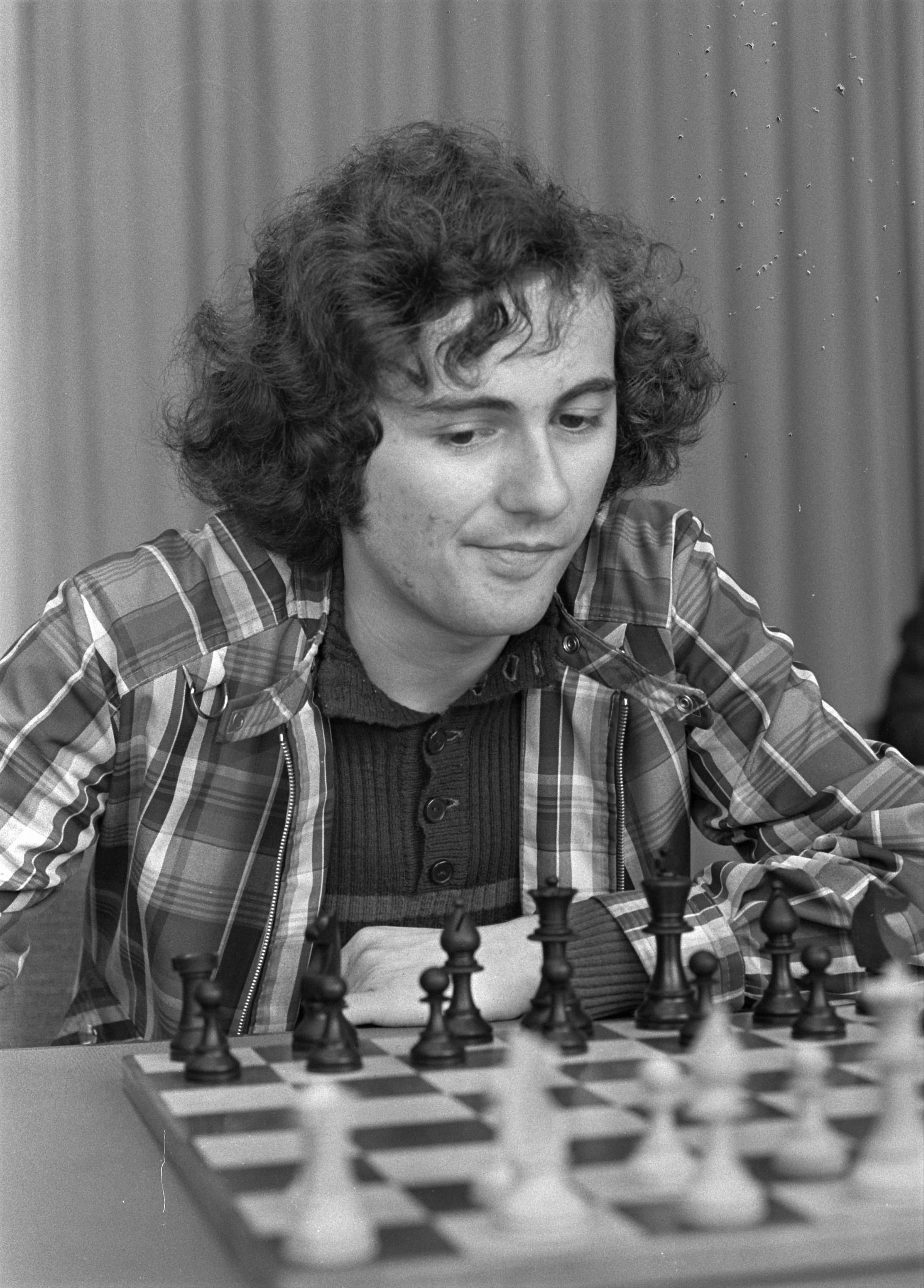
Knaak (Amsterdam, 1974)

- Morphy: Genius and Myth - Müller & Knaak (Chessbase CD)
- The Greatest Tournaments in the History of Chess, 1851-1986 - Knaak & Fruth (Chessbase CD)
- 1000 Opening Traps - Müller & Knaak (Chessbase CD)
- Trompowsky - Knaak (Chessbase CD)
- Mating Attack Against 0-0 - Knaak (Chessbase CD)
- 222 Opening Traps after 1.e4 - Müller & Knaak (Olms, 2008)
- 222 Opening Traps after 1.d4 - Müller & Knaak (Olms, 2008)
