= Pasewalk =

Town in Mecklenburg-Vorpommern, Germany

- Town
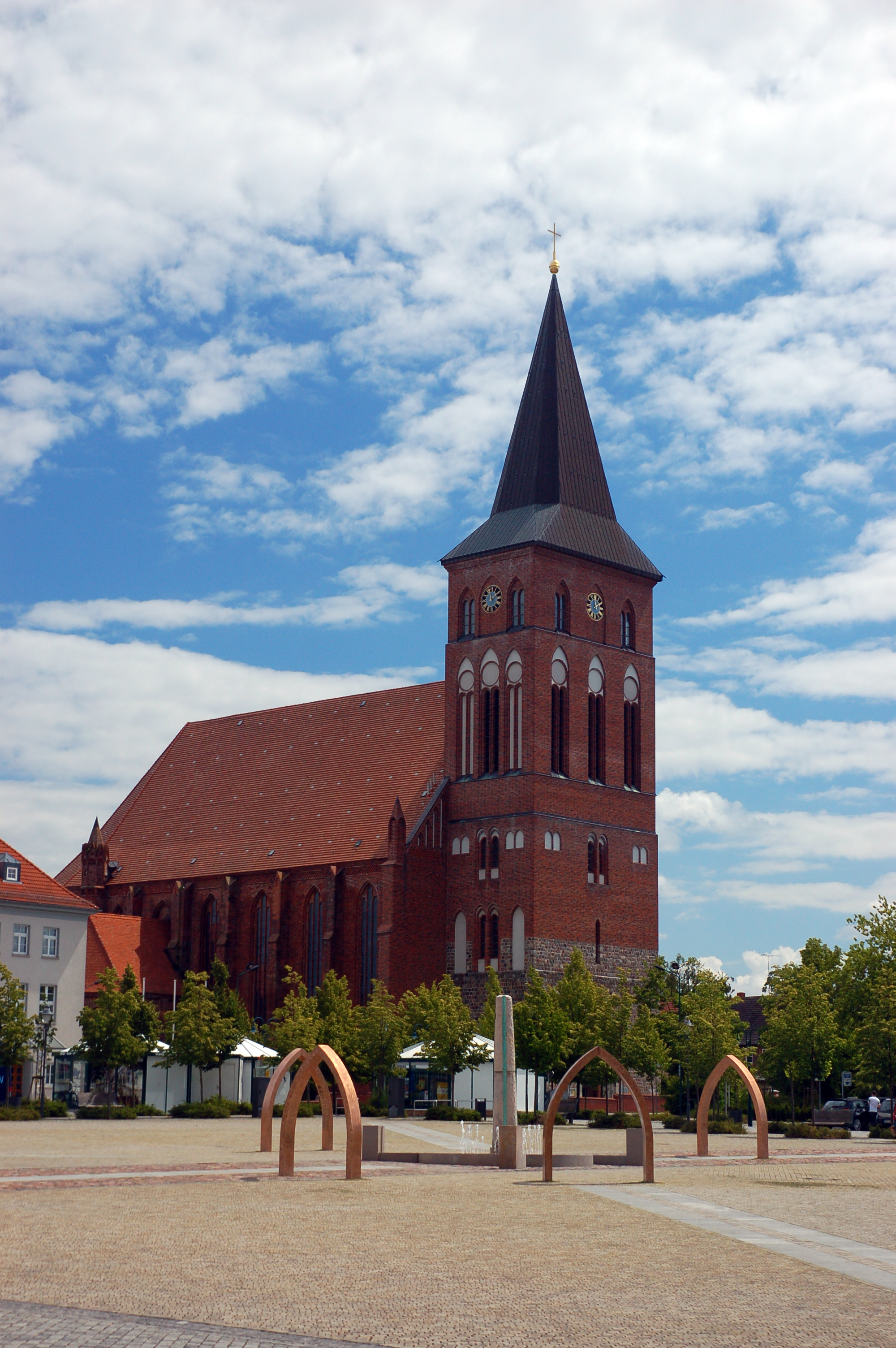
- St. Mary in the center of Pasewalk

- Coat of arms

- Location of Pasewalk within Vorpommern-Greifswald district
- Interactive map of Pasewalk
- Location within Germany Location within Mecklenburg-Vorpommern
- Coordinates: 53°30′N 14°00′E
- Country: Germany
- State: Mecklenburg-Vorpommern
- District: Vorpommern-Greifswald

Government
  - Mayor: Danny Rodewald (Ind.)

Area
  - Total: 55.21 km^{2} (21.32 sq mi)
- Elevation: 15 m (49 ft)

Population (2025-12-31)
  - Total: 9,590
  - Density: 174/km^{2} (450/sq mi)
- Time zone: UTC+01:00 (CET)
  - Summer (DST): UTC+02:00 (CEST)
- Postal codes: 17309
- Dialling codes: 03973
- Vehicle registration: VG, PW
- Website: pasewalk.de

Pasewalk (German: [ˈpaːzəvalk]) is a town in the Vorpommern-Greifswald district, in the state of Mecklenburg-Vorpommern in north-eastern Germany. Located on the Uecker river, it is the capital of the former Uecker-Randow district, and the seat of the Uecker-Randow-Tal Amt, of which it is not part.

== Name ==
The earliest reference to Posduwlc is dated to approximately 1150. Later, the name of the settlement was also documented as: 1168 Pozdewolk, 1177 Posdewolc, Pozdewolk, 1260 Poswalc, 1276 Poswalk, 1288 Pozewalch, 1302 Pasewalck. The initial interpretation of the toponymy was provided by the authors of the Annals of Pegau (Annales Pegavienses) in the mid-12th century, who explained the place name in Latin as urbs Wolfi (‘Wolf’s castle’) from the Polabian *vouk ‘wolf’. More recently, the toponym has been linked to Old Polabian *volk and Proto-Slavic *vľ̥kti ‘to drag, to pull’, associated with Polabian *vlåk ‘fishing net, trawl net’. The first part of the old place name pozde, pozdu, remains challenging to interpret, but could be related to Proto-Slavic *pozdъ ‘late’, which is thought to be derived from Indo-European *pos ‘at, by, after’.

In certain Polish sources, the name has been rendered as Pozdawilk.

== History ==
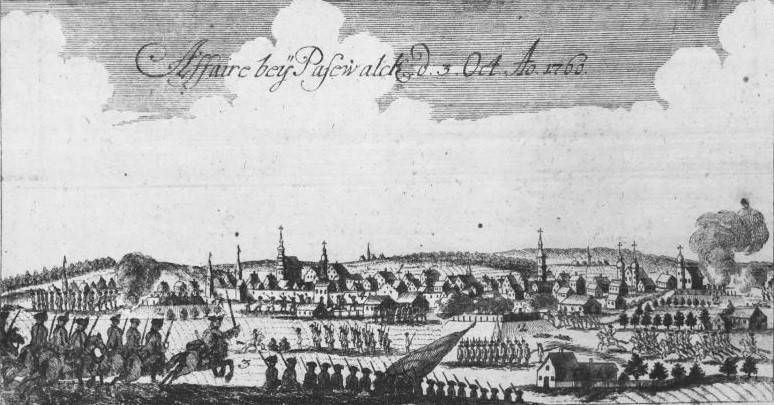
Depiction of the Battle of Pasewalk of 1760

Pasewalk became a town during the 12th century and was soon a member of the Hanseatic League. In 1359 it passed to the Duke of Pomerania. Frequently ravaged during the wars which devastated the district, it was plundered several times by Imperial troops during the Thirty Years' War. In the Peace of Westphalia in 1648 it was given to Sweden. In 1657 it was burned down by the Poles, in 1676 it was conquered by Brandenburg, and in 1713 it was burned down by the Russians. In 1720, in the Peace of Stockholm, it passed from Sweden to Prussia. In the early 18th century, a commune of French Huguenots was established in the town. It was part to the Prussian Province of Pomerania from 1720 until 1945. In 1760, the Battle of Pasewalk was fought, won by the Swedes.

The town is famous for having been surrendered to the French without a fight during the War of the Fourth Coalition, despite them being far less numerous than the defenders of the city. On the day World War I ended, Adolf Hitler, the future dictator of Nazi Germany, was being treated here after being wounded by a gas attack. During the Battle of Berlin, part of World War II, Pasewalk was captured by troops of the 2nd Belorussian Front of the Red Army on 28 April 1945. From 1945 to 1952, Pasewalk was part of the State of Mecklenburg-Vorpommern, from 1952 to 1990 of the Bezirk Neubrandenburg of East Germany and since 1990 again of Mecklenburg-Vorpommern.

== Mayors of Pasewalk ==
- 1905–1917 Wilhelm Prüter
- 1917–1937 Dr. Willy Peppler (1880–1957)
- 1937–1942 Malsfey
- 1942 Klingbeil
- 1942–? Hans-Heinrich Wentzlaff-Eggebert (1894–1966)
- 1945–? Hermann Bülow
- 1945–1949 Erich Pretzer (1882–1968)
- 1950–1961 Helene Medrow (1902–1976)
- 1961–1974 Eberhard Schmidt (1924–2010)
- around 1982 Börner
- 1986–1990 Bärbel Steinmüller (born 1948)
- 1990–1994 Heinz-Georg Eckleben (born 1945), independent
- 1994–2002 Wilfried Sieber (born 1941), CDU
- 2002–2014 Rainer Dambach (1952–2013), independent
- November 2013–May 2014 Gudrun Baganz, temporary
- May 2014 – May 2022 Sandra Nachtweih (born 1975), independent
- since May 2022 Danny Rodewald (born 1979), independent

=== Population over time ===
Year	Inhabitants
1618	ca. 2.000
1648	ca. 250
1740	2.401
1812	3.888
1848	ca. 6.500
1852	6.586
1880	9.469
1885	9.514
1895	9.788

Year	Inhabitants
1900	10.299
1919	11.041
1925	11.768
1933	12.582
1939	12.568
1955	12.597
1980	15.366
1985	15.881
1990	15.516
1995	13.932

Year	Inhabitants
2010	11.319
2015	10.535

== Born in Pasewalk ==
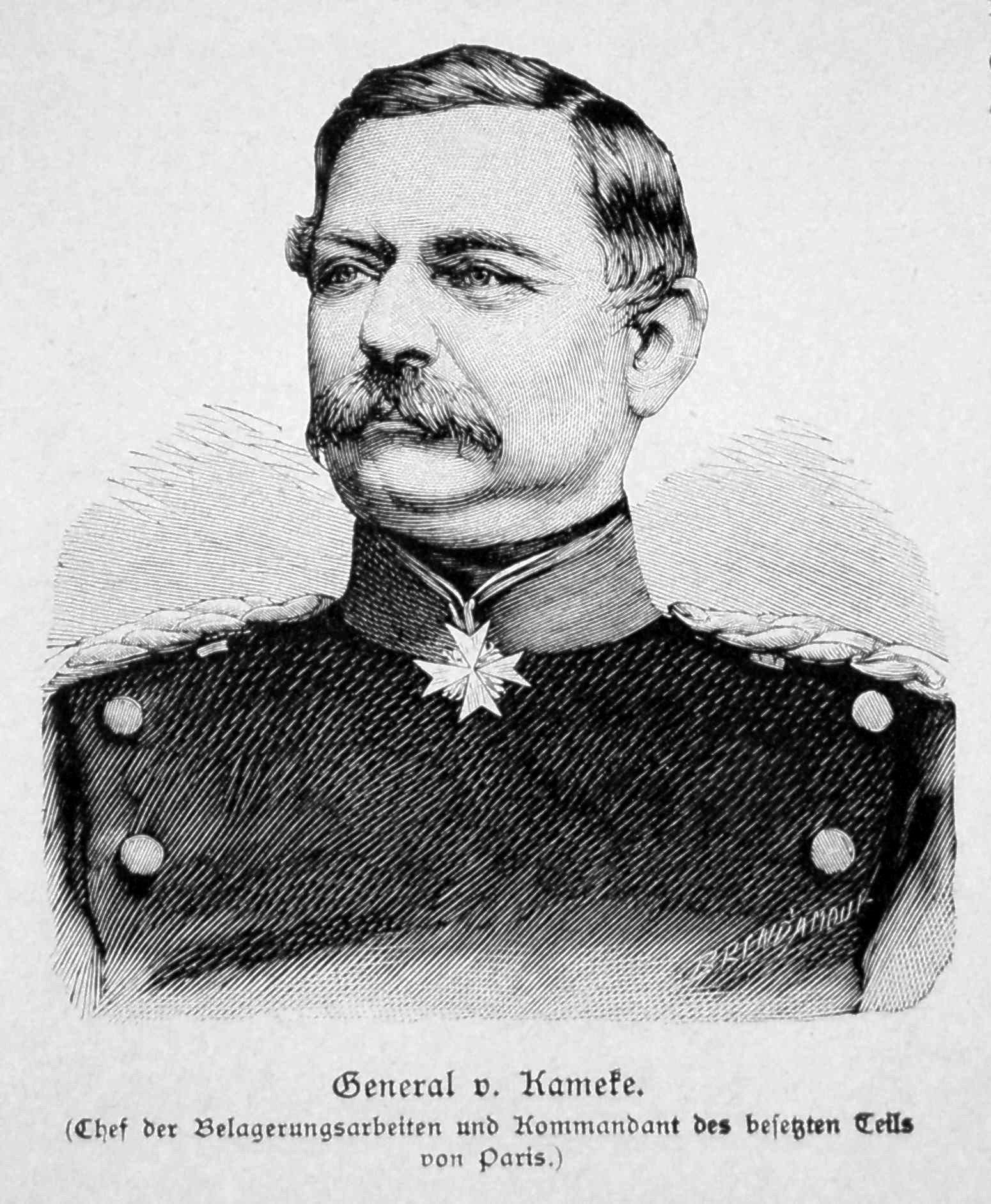
Georg von Kameke

- Wilhelm von Tümpling (1809–1884), Prussian General of the Infantry
- Georg von Kameke (1817–1893), Prussian General of the Infantry and War Minister
- Erich Paulun (1862–1909), former naval surgeon, founded the Tongji Hospital in Wuhan
- Oskar Picht (1871–1945), German teacher and inventor of the first braille typewriter
- Erich Hamann (born 1944), German footballer (265 games) and player of the GDR national football team
- Rainer Knaak (born 1953), German chess Grandmaster
- Sabine Zimmermann (born 1960), German politician
- Patrick Dahlemann (born 1988),politician
- Chris Gueffroy (1968–1989), penultimate death victim on the Berlin Wall

== Climate ==
Köppen-Geiger climate classification system classifies its climate as oceanic (Cfb).

Climate data for Pasewalk
Month	Jan	Feb	Mar	Apr	May	Jun	Jul	Aug	Sep	Oct	Nov	Dec	Year
Mean daily maximum °C (°F)	1.1 (34.0)	2.1 (35.8)	6.9 (44.4)	12.6 (54.7)	18 (64)	21.5 (70.7)	22.8 (73.0)	22.6 (72.7)	18.6 (65.5)	12.8 (55.0)	6.9 (44.4)	3 (37)	12.4 (54.3)
Daily mean °C (°F)	−1.3 (29.7)	−0.6 (30.9)	3.4 (38.1)	8.2 (46.8)	13 (55)	16.6 (61.9)	18.2 (64.8)	17.8 (64.0)	14.3 (57.7)	9.6 (49.3)	4.5 (40.1)	0.9 (33.6)	8.7 (47.7)
Mean daily minimum °C (°F)	−3.6 (25.5)	−3.3 (26.1)	0 (32)	3.8 (38.8)	8 (46)	11.7 (53.1)	13.6 (56.5)	13.1 (55.6)	10.1 (50.2)	6.5 (43.7)	2.1 (35.8)	−1.2 (29.8)	5.1 (41.1)
Average precipitation mm (inches)	38 (1.5)	29 (1.1)	33 (1.3)	38 (1.5)	51 (2.0)	60 (2.4)	63 (2.5)	57 (2.2)	48 (1.9)	41 (1.6)	45 (1.8)	44 (1.7)	547 (21.5)
Source: Climate-Data.org (altitude: 16m)

== International relations ==
Pasewalk is twinned with:

- Belgium: Halen
- Germany: Norden
- Poland: Police
