= French Defence =

Chess opening

Position: a8 black rook, b8 black knight, c8 black bishop, d8 black queen, e8 black king, f8 black bishop, g8 black knight, h8 black rook, a7 black pawn, b7 black pawn, c7 black pawn, d7 black pawn, f7 black pawn, g7 black pawn, h7 black pawn, e6 black pawn, e4 white pawn, a2 white pawn, b2 white pawn, c2 white pawn, d2 white pawn, f2 white pawn, g2 white pawn, h2 white pawn, a1 white rook, b1 white knight, c1 white bishop, d1 white queen, e1 white king, f1 white bishop, g1 white knight, h1 white rook
- Moves: 1.e4 e6
- ECO: C00–C19
- Named after: London vs. Paris correspondence match (1834–1836)
- Parent: King's Pawn Game

The French Defence is a chess opening characterised by the moves:

1. e4 e6

This is most commonly followed by 2.d4 d5. Black usually plays ...c5 soon after, attacking White's pawn centre and gaining space on the queenside. The French has a reputation for solidity and resilience, although some lines such as the Winawer Variation can lead to sharp complications. Black's position is often somewhat cramped in the early game; in particular, the pawn on e6 can impede the development of the bishop on c8, known by many players as the "French bishop".

== History ==
The French Defence is named after a match played by correspondence between the cities of London and Paris in 1834 (although earlier examples of games with the opening do exist). It was Jacques Chamouillet, one of the players of the Paris team, who persuaded the others to adopt this defence.

Along with other openings besides 1.e4 e5, the French Defence received relatively little attention until the twentieth century. The first world chess champion Wilhelm Steinitz said "I have never in my life played the French Defence, which is the dullest of all openings". In the early 20th century, Géza Maróczy was perhaps the first world-class player to make it his primary weapon against 1.e4. For the last several decades, it has usually been the third most popular reply to 1.e4, behind only 1...c5 and 1...e5. It was even temporarily ranked above 1...e5 in frequency around 2006.

Historically important contributors to the theory of the defence include Mikhail Botvinnik, Viktor Korchnoi, Akiba Rubinstein, Aron Nimzowitsch, Tigran Petrosian, Lev Psakhis, Wolfgang Uhlmann, and Rafael Vaganian. More recently, its leading practitioners include Evgeny Bareev, Alexey Dreev, Mikhail Gurevich, Alexander Khalifman, Smbat Lputian, Alexander Morozevich, Teimour Radjabov, Nigel Short, Gata Kamsky, Ding Liren, and Yury Shulman.

The Exchange Variation was recommended by Howard Staunton in the 19th century, but has been in decline ever since. In the early 1990s, Garry Kasparov briefly experimented with it before switching to 3.Nc3. Black's game is made much easier as his queen's bishop has been liberated. It has the reputation of giving immediate equality to Black due to the symmetrical pawn structure.

Like the Exchange, the Advance Variation was frequently played in the early days of the French Defence. Aron Nimzowitsch believed it to be White's best choice and enriched its theory with many ideas. The Advance declined in popularity, however, throughout most of the 20th century until it was revived in the 1980s by grandmaster (GM) and prominent opening theoretician Evgeny Sveshnikov, who continued to be a leading expert in this line. In recent years, it has become nearly as popular as 3.Nd2; GM Alexander Grischuk has championed it successfully at the highest levels. It is also a popular choice at the club level due to the availability of a simple, straightforward plan involving attacking chances and extra space.

== Basics ==
Position: a8 black rook, b8 black knight, c8 black bishop, d8 black queen, e8 black king, f8 black bishop, g8 black knight, h8 black rook, a7 black pawn, b7 black pawn, c7 black pawn, f7 black pawn, g7 black pawn, h7 black pawn, e6 black pawn, d5 black pawn, d4 white pawn, e4 white pawn, a2 white pawn, b2 white pawn, c2 white pawn, f2 white pawn, g2 white pawn, h2 white pawn, a1 white rook, b1 white knight, c1 white bishop, d1 white queen, e1 white king, f1 white bishop, g1 white knight, h1 white rook

Position after 1.e4 e6 2.d4 d5

Following the opening moves 1.e4 e6, the main line of the French Defence continues 2.d4 d5. White sets up a pawn centre, which Black immediately challenges by attacking the pawn on e4. The same position can be reached by transposition from a Queen's Pawn Game after 1.d4 e6 2.e4 d5 or the declining of a Blackmar–Diemer Gambit after 1.d4 d5 2.e4 e6.

White's options include defending the e4-pawn with 3.Nc3 or 3.Nd2, advancing it with 3.e5, or exchanging it with 3.exd5, each of which leads to different types of positions. Defending the pawn with 3.Bd3 allows 3...dxe4 4.Bxe4 Nf6, when Black gains either a tempo or the advantage of the two bishops.

After 3.Nc3, played in over 40% of all games after 1.e4 e6 2.d4 d5, Black has three main options, treated separately: 3...Bb4 (the Winawer Variation), 3...Nf6 (the Classical Variation), and 3...dxe4 (the Rubinstein Variation).

== General themes ==
Position: a7 black pawn, b7 black pawn, c7 black pawn, f7 black pawn, g7 black pawn, h7 black pawn, e6 black pawn, d5 black pawn, e5 white pawn, d4 white pawn, a2 white pawn, b2 white pawn, c2 white pawn, f2 white pawn, g2 white pawn, h2 white pawn

Typical pawn structure

The diagram shows a pawn structure commonly found in the French. Black has more space on the queenside, so tends to focus on that side of the board, almost always playing c7–c5 early on to attack White's pawn chain at its base, and may follow up by advancing the a- and b-pawns.

Position: a8 black rook, c8 black bishop, e8 black king, f8 black bishop, h8 black rook, a7 black pawn, b7 black pawn, f7 black pawn, g7 black pawn, h7 black pawn, b6 black queen, c6 black knight, e6 black pawn, h6 black knight, c5 black pawn, d5 black pawn, e5 white pawn, d4 white pawn, f4 white pawn, c3 white pawn, f3 white knight, a2 white pawn, b2 white pawn, g2 white pawn, h2 white pawn, a1 white rook, b1 white knight, c1 white bishop, d1 white queen, e1 white king, f1 white bishop, h1 white rook

Position after 1.e4 e6 2.d4 d5 3.e5 c5 4.c3 Nc6 5.f4 Qb6 6.Nf3 Nh6

Alternatively or simultaneously, Black will play against White's centre, which is cramping Black's position. In the unlikely case that the flank attack c7–c5 is insufficient to achieve counterplay, Black can also try f7–f6. In many positions, White may support the pawn on e5 by playing f2–f4, with ideas of f4–f5, but the primary drawback to the advance of the f-pawn is opening of the g1–a7 diagonal, which is particularly significant due to the black queen's oft-found position on b6 and the heavy pressure on d4. In addition, many French Advance lines do not provide White with the time to play f2–f4 as it does not support the heavily pressured d4-pawn. For instance, 1.e4 e6 2.d4 d5 3.e5 c5 4.c3 Nc6 5.f4? (if White plays Nf3, f4 will come much slower) 5...Qb6 6.Nf3 Nh6! and the knight will go to f5 to place fatal pressure on d4 and dxc5 will never be an option as the white king would be stuck in the centre of the board after ...Bxc5.

Position: a8 black rook, b8 black knight, c8 black bishop, f8 black rook, g8 black king, a7 black pawn, b7 black pawn, d7 black knight, e7 black queen, f7 black pawn, g7 black pawn, h7 black pawn, e6 black pawn, c5 black pawn, d5 black pawn, e5 white pawn, d4 white pawn, f4 white pawn, c3 white knight, d3 white bishop, f3 white knight, a2 white pawn, b2 white pawn, c2 white pawn, g2 white pawn, h2 white pawn, a1 white rook, d1 white queen, e1 white king, h1 white rook

Classical French with 9.Bd3

White usually tries to exploit the extra space on the kingside, often playing for a mating attack. White tries to do this in the Alekhine–Chatard Attack, for example. Another example is the following line of the Classical French: 1.e4 e6 2.d4 d5 3.Nc3 Nf6 4.Bg5 Be7 5.e5 Nfd7 6.Bxe7 Qxe7 7.f4 0-0 8.Nf3 c5 9.Bd3 (diagram). White's light-square bishop eyes the weak h7-pawn, which is usually defended by a knight on f6, but here it has been pushed away by e5. If 9...cxd4 (Black does better with 9...f5 or 9...f6), White can play the Greek gift sacrifice 10.Bxh7+ Kxh7 11.Ng5+ Qxg5! 12.fxg5 dxc3 13.Qh5+! where Black has three minor pieces for the queen, a slight material superiority, but has a vulnerable king and White has good attacking chances.

Apart from a piece attack, White may play for the advance of the kingside pawns (an especially common idea in the endgame), which usually involves f2–f4, g2–g4 and then f4–f5 to use the spatial advantage on that side of the board. A white pawn on f5 can be very strong as it may threaten to capture on e6 or advance to f6. Sometimes pushing the h-pawn to h5 or h6 may also be effective. A modern idea is for White to gain space on the queenside by playing a2–a3 and b2–b4. If implemented successfully, this will further restrict Black's pieces.

Tarrasch vs. Teichmann, 1912

Position: a8 black rook, c8 black bishop, f8 black rook, g8 black king, f7 black pawn, g7 black pawn, h7 black pawn, a6 black pawn, e6 black pawn, b5 black pawn, c5 black knight, d5 black pawn, e5 white pawn, f4 white pawn, c3 white knight, g3 white pawn, a2 white pawn, b2 white pawn, c2 white pawn, g2 white bishop, h2 white pawn, a1 white rook, f1 white rook, g1 white king

Position after 15...Nxc5

One of the drawbacks of the French Defence for Black is the queen's bishop, which is blocked in by the pawn on e6 and can remain passive throughout the game. An often-cited example of the potential weakness of this bishop is Siegbert Tarrasch–Richard Teichmann, San Sebastián 1912, in which the diagrammed position was reached after fifteen moves of a Classical French.

Black's position is passive because the light-square bishop is hemmed in by pawns on a6, b5, d5, e6, and f7. White will probably try to exchange Black's knight, which is the only one of Black's pieces that has any scope. Although it might be possible for Black to hold on for a draw, it is not easy and, barring any mistakes by White, Black will have few chances to create counterplay.

Owing to this, for many years, the classical lines fell out of favour, and 3...Bb4 began to be seen more frequently after World War I, owing to the efforts of Aron Nimzowitsch and Mikhail Botvinnik. In Tarrasch–Teichmann, White won after 41 moves. In order to avoid this fate, Black usually makes it a priority early in the game to find a useful post for the bishop. Black can play ...Bd7–a4 to attack a pawn on c2, which occurs in many lines of the Winawer Variation. If Black's f-pawn has moved to f6, then Black may also consider bringing the bishop to g6 or h5 via d7 and e8. If White's light-square bishop is on the f1–a6 diagonal, Black can try to exchange it by playing ...b6 and ...Ba6, or ...Qb6 followed by ...Bd7–b5.

== Classical Variation: 3.Nc3 Nf6 ==
Position: a8 black rook, b8 black knight, c8 black bishop, d8 black queen, e8 black king, f8 black bishop, h8 black rook, a7 black pawn, b7 black pawn, c7 black pawn, f7 black pawn, g7 black pawn, h7 black pawn, e6 black pawn, f6 black knight, d5 black pawn, d4 white pawn, e4 white pawn, c3 white knight, a2 white pawn, b2 white pawn, c2 white pawn, f2 white pawn, g2 white pawn, h2 white pawn, a1 white rook, c1 white bishop, d1 white queen, e1 white king, f1 white bishop, g1 white knight, h1 white rook

Classical Variation: 3.Nc3 Nf6

3.Nc3 Nf6 reaches a major system in the French. The position was seen as so normal that no one thought about claiming it. White's most common responses are 4.e5 (the Steinitz Variation) and 4.Bg5, pinning Black's knight to Black's queen. White threatens 5.e5, attacking the pinned knight; Black has a number of ways to meet this threat: 4...Be7, the classical continuation; 4...dxe4, the Burn Variation; and 4...Bb4, the McCutcheon Variation, which counterattacks rather than deal with the threat immediately.

=== Old main line: 4.Bg5 Be7 5.e5 Nfd7 6.Bxe7 Qxe7 ===
Position: a8 black rook, b8 black knight, c8 black bishop, e8 black king, h8 black rook, a7 black pawn, b7 black pawn, c7 black pawn, d7 black knight, e7 black queen, f7 black pawn, g7 black pawn, h7 black pawn, e6 black pawn, d5 black pawn, e5 white pawn, d4 white pawn, f4 white pawn, c3 white knight, a2 white pawn, b2 white pawn, c2 white pawn, g2 white pawn, h2 white pawn, a1 white rook, d1 white queen, e1 white king, f1 white bishop, g1 white knight, h1 white rook

Position after 4.Bg5 Be7 5.e5 Nfd7 6.Bxe7 Qxe7 7.f4

4.Bg5 Be7 5.e5 Nfd7 6.Bxe7 Qxe7 used to be the main line of the French Defence, but the Burn Variation (4...dxe4) has overtaken 4...Be7 in popularity, 4.e5 is now comparably popular to 4.Bg5, and 6.h4 rivals 6.Bxe7 in frequency.

After 6.Bxe7 Qxe7, White's usual move is 7.f4, which was extremely rare in the 19th century (though played once by Wilhelm Steinitz), but became dominant during the 20th century. It typically continues 7...0-0 (not 7...c5? 8.Nb5!) 8.Nf3 c5 or 7...a6 8.Nf3 c5. White has a number of ninth move options, including (for both lines) 9.Bd3, 9.Qd2 and 9.dxc5.

White has the following common seventh-move alternatives:

- 7.Nb5, the Alapin Variation, was also played several times by Emanuel Lasker. The main reply is 7...Nb6.
- 7.Qd2, played by Akiba Rubinstein and Siegbert Tarrasch, typically continues with 7...a6 or 7...0-0; transposition to the 7.f4 line after 8.f4 and 9.Nf3 is very common.
- 7.Qg4 is the aggressive Pollock Variation; the most common reply is 7...0-0.
- 7.Bd3 is occasionally seen.

=== Alekhine–Chatard Attack: 6.h4 ===
Position: a8 black rook, b8 black knight, c8 black bishop, e8 black king, h8 black rook, b7 black pawn, c7 black pawn, d7 black knight, e7 black queen, f7 black pawn, g7 black pawn, a6 black pawn, e6 black pawn, h6 black pawn, d5 black pawn, e5 white pawn, d4 white pawn, f4 white pawn, g4 white pawn, h4 white pawn, c3 white knight, a2 white pawn, b2 white pawn, c2 white pawn, a1 white rook, d1 white queen, e1 white king, f1 white bishop, g1 white knight, h1 white rook

Alekhine–Chatard Attack Declined: White forces an attack after 6...h6 7.Bxe7 Qxe7 8.f4 a6 9.g4.

An alternative for White is the gambit 6.h4, which was devised by Adolf Albin and played by Chatard, but not taken seriously until the game Alekhine–Fahrni, Mannheim 1914. It is known today as the Albin–Chatard Attack or the Alekhine–Chatard Attack. Additional names are Chatard–Alekhine Attack, Albin Attack, and Alekhine Attack. After 6...Bxg5 7.hxg5 Qxg5 8.Nh3 Qe7 9.Qg4 g6 10.Ng5 (the reason for 8.Nh3 rather than 8.Nf3 is to play Qg4), White has sacrificed a pawn to keep the black king in the centre, as castling neither queenside nor kingside appears safe. Another point of the gambit is that Black's natural French Defence move 6...c5 runs into 7.Bxe7 when Black must either move the king with 7...Kxe7 or allow 7...Qxe7 8.Nb5! with a dual threat of Nc7+, winning the rook on a8, and Nd6+, when Black's king must move and the knight is very strong on d6. Black may decline the gambit in several ways such as 6...a6 and 6...h6. After 6...a6, White can continue to play for an attack with the aggressive 7.Qg4! threatening Bxe7 and then Qxg7. Black is forced to eliminate the bishop with 7...Bxg5 8.hxg5, opening up the h-file. A wild game with unsafe kings is sure to ensue. 6...h6 is a safer declination of the sacrifice, forcing the bishop to trade with 7.Bxe7 Qxe7 after which White may continue to try to attack on the kingside in anticipation of Black castling kingside (since queenside castling is undesirable due to the need for c5) with 8.f4 a6 9.g4 with a menacing attack.

=== Burn Variation: 4.Bg5 dxe4 ===
Position: a8 black rook, b8 black knight, c8 black bishop, d8 black queen, e8 black king, f8 black bishop, h8 black rook, a7 black pawn, b7 black pawn, c7 black pawn, f7 black pawn, g7 black pawn, h7 black pawn, e6 black pawn, f6 black knight, g5 white bishop, d4 white pawn, e4 white knight, a2 white pawn, b2 white pawn, c2 white pawn, f2 white pawn, g2 white pawn, h2 white pawn, a1 white rook, d1 white queen, e1 white king, f1 white bishop, g1 white knight, h1 white rook

Burn Variation, main line: 4.Bg5 dxe4 5.Nxe4

Named after Amos Burn, the Burn Variation is the most common reply at the top level. After White's usual 5.Nxe4, the main line continues 5...Be7 6.Bxf6 Bxf6 7.Nf3 Nd7 (or 7...0-0), resulting in a position resembling those arising from the Rubinstein Variation. Here Black has the bishop pair, however, with greater dynamic chances (although White's knight is well placed on e4), so this line is more popular than the Rubinstein and has long been a favourite of Evgeny Bareev.

After 5...Be7 6.Bxf6, Black can also try 6...gxf6, as played by Alexander Morozevich and Gregory Kaidanov; by following up with ...f5 and ...Bf6, Black obtains active piece play in return for poor pawn structure.

An alternative line for Black that also resembles the Rubinstein begins with 5...Nbd7, continuing 6.Nf3 Be7 (6...h6 is also tried) 7.Nxf6+ Bxf6.

=== McCutcheon Variation: 4.Bg5 Bb4 ===
Position: a8 black rook, b8 black knight, c8 black bishop, d8 black queen, e8 black king, h8 black rook, a7 black pawn, b7 black pawn, c7 black pawn, f7 black pawn, g7 black pawn, e6 black pawn, f6 black knight, h6 black pawn, d5 black pawn, e5 white pawn, g5 white bishop, b4 black bishop, d4 white pawn, c3 white knight, a2 white pawn, b2 white pawn, c2 white pawn, f2 white pawn, g2 white pawn, h2 white pawn, a1 white rook, d1 white queen, e1 white king, f1 white bishop, g1 white knight, h1 white rook

McCutcheon Variation, main line: 4.Bg5 Bb4 5.e5 h6

A third choice for Black is to counterattack with the McCutcheon Variation. In this variation, Black ignores White's threat of e4–e5 and instead plays 4...Bb4. The main line continues: 5.e5 h6 6.Bd2 Bxc3 7.bxc3 Ne4 8.Qg4. At this point Black may play 8...g6, which weakens the kingside dark squares but keeps the option of castling queenside, or 8...Kf8. An alternative way White can treat 5...h6 is to carry through with the threat with 6.exf6 hxg5 7.fxg7 Rg8. The McCutcheon Variation is named for John Lindsay McCutcheon of Philadelphia (1857–1905), who brought the variation to public attention when he used it to defeat World Champion Steinitz in a simultaneous exhibition in Manhattan in 1885. It reached the height of its popularity from 1905 until 1925. After that it disappeared from public eye until it was revived in 1990.

=== Steinitz Variation: 4.e5 ===
Position: a8 black rook, b8 black knight, c8 black bishop, d8 black queen, e8 black king, f8 black bishop, h8 black rook, a7 black pawn, b7 black pawn, c7 black pawn, d7 black knight, f7 black pawn, g7 black pawn, h7 black pawn, e6 black pawn, d5 black pawn, e5 white pawn, d4 white pawn, c3 white knight, a2 white pawn, b2 white pawn, c2 white pawn, f2 white pawn, g2 white pawn, h2 white pawn, a1 white rook, c1 white bishop, d1 white queen, e1 white king, f1 white bishop, g1 white knight, h1 white rook

Steinitz Variation after 4.e5 Nfd7

Named after Wilhelm Steinitz, the Steinitz Variation continues with 4.e5 Nfd7. Here 5.Nce2, the Shirov–Anand Variation, prepares to bolster the white pawn centre with c2–c3 and f2–f4; while 5.Nf3 transposes to a position also reached via the Two Knights Variation (2.Nf3 d5 3.Nc3 Nf6 4.e5 Nfd7 5.d4). The main line of the Steinitz is 5.f4 c5 6.Nf3 Nc6 7.Be3. (Instead 7.Ne2 transposes to the Shirov–Anand Variation, while 7.Be2? cxd4 8.Nxd4 Ndxe5! 9.fxe5 Qh4+ wins a pawn for Black.) Here Black may step up the pressure on d4 by playing 7...Qb6 or 7...cxd4 8.Nxd4 Qb6, begin queenside play with 7...a6 8.Qd2 b5, or continue kingside development by playing 7...Be7 or 7...cxd4 8.Nxd4 Bc5. Another side-line for 7...cxd4 is 8.Nxd4 Bc5 9. Qd2 Bxd4 10.Bxd4 Nxd4 11. Qxd4 Qb6 12.Qxb6 Nxb6, This line has been referred to as the Vacuum Cleaner Variation. In these lines, White has the option of playing either Qd2 and 0-0-0, or Be2 and 0-0, with the former typically leading to sharper positions due to opposite-side castling when Black castles kingside in both cases.

== Winawer Variation: 3.Nc3 Bb4 ==
Position: a8 black rook, b8 black knight, c8 black bishop, d8 black queen, e8 black king, g8 black knight, h8 black rook, a7 black pawn, b7 black pawn, f7 black pawn, g7 black pawn, h7 black pawn, e6 black pawn, c5 black pawn, d5 black pawn, e5 white pawn, d4 white pawn, a3 white pawn, c3 white pawn, c2 white pawn, f2 white pawn, g2 white pawn, h2 white pawn, a1 white rook, c1 white bishop, d1 white queen, e1 white king, f1 white bishop, g1 white knight, h1 white rook

Winawer Variation after 3...Bb4 4.e5 c5 5.a3 Bxc3+ 6.bxc3

The Winawer Variation, named after Szymon Winawer and pioneered by Aron Nimzowitsch and Mikhail Botvinnik, is one of the main systems in the French. In great part due to Botvinnik's efforts in the 1940s, it became the most often seen rejoinder to 3.Nc3; however, in the 1980s, 3...Nf6 began a revival, and has since overtaken 3...Bb4 in popularity.

3...Bb4 pins the knight on c3, forcing White to resolve the central tension. White normally clarifies the central situation for the moment with 4.e5, gaining space and hoping to show that Black's bishop is misplaced on b4. The main line of the Winawer then continues 4...c5 5.a3 Bxc3+ 6.bxc3. After 6.bxc3, Black's main move is 6...Ne7.

Black has sixth-move alternatives. One possibility is 6...Qc7, which frequently transposes to the 6...Ne7 line after 7.Qg4 Ne7, though Black may avoid this, often with 7...f5 or 7...f6. 6...Qa5 has recently become a popular alternative to both moves; 6...Nc6 is also occasionally seen.

While White has doubled pawns on the queenside, which form the basis for Black's counterplay, they can also help White since they strengthen the centre and create a semi-open b-file. White has a spatial advantage on the kingside, where Black is even weaker than usual, having traded off the dark-square bishop. Combined with possession of the bishop pair, this gives White attacking chances, though the long-term features of this pawn structure favour Black.

=== Main line: 4.e5 c5 5.a3 Bxc3+ 6.bxc3 Ne7 ===
After 6...Ne7, White's most common response is 7.Qg4. This move invites great tactical complications; if these are not to White's taste, 7.Nf3 and 7.a4 are good positional alternatives, and 7.h4 is a more aggressive attempt.

Black can gain attacking chances in most lines: against 7.Qg4, Black will attack White's king in the centre; whereas against the other lines, Black can often gain an attack with ...0-0-0, normally combined with ...c4 to close the queenside, and then ...f6 to open up the kingside, where White's king often resides. If Black can accomplish this, White is often left without meaningful play, although ...c4 does permit White a4 followed by Ba3 if Black has not stopped this by placing a piece on a4 (for example, by Bd7–a4).

==== 7.Qg4 ====
White's move 7.Qg4 exploits the fact that Black's bishop no longer defends g7. Black has a choice: give up two kingside pawns with 7...Qc7 8.Qxg7 Rg8 9.Qxh7 cxd4, but destroy White's centre in return, the so-called "Poisoned Pawn Variation"; or, play 7...0-0, continuing 8.Bd3 Nbc6, which avoids giving up material, but leaves the king on the flank where White is trying to attack. A more recent alternative is 7...Kf8, which tries to make use of the locked pawn centre (the king is safe from central attacks, and can run away from a kingside attack).

Experts on the 7.Qg4 line include Judit Polgár. It has also been played by World Champion Garry Kasparov.

==== 7.Nf3 ====
7.Nf3 is a natural developing move, and White usually follows it up by developing the king's bishop to d3 or e2 (occasionally to b5) and castling kingside. This line often continues 7...Bd7 8.Bd3 c4 9.Be2 Ba4 10.0-0 Qa5 11.Bd2 Nbc6 12.Ng5 h6 13.Nh3 0-0-0. Its assessment is unclear, but it is not considered the most challenging line for Black.

==== 7.a4 ====
7.a4 has a threefold purpose: it prepares Bc1–a3, taking advantage of the absence of Black's dark-square bishop. It also prevents Black from playing ...Qa5–a4 or ...Bd7–a4 attacking c2, and if Black plays ...b6 (followed by ...Ba6 to trade off the bad bishop), White may play a5 to attack the b6-pawn. World Champions Vasily Smyslov and Bobby Fischer both used this line with success.

==== 7.h4 ====
7.h4 has the ideas of either pushing this pawn to h6 to cause more dark-square weaknesses in the Black kingside (if Black meets h5 with ...h6, White can play g4–g5), or getting the rook into the game via Rh3–g3.

=== 5...Ba5 ===
After 4.e5 c5 5.a3, Black is not forced to capture the knight on c3 and can instead play 5...Ba5. This is sometimes called the Armenian Variation, as its theory and practice have been much enriched by players from that country, most notably Rafael Vaganian.

As Black maintains the pin on the knight by declining to exchange, White usually tries to break it by playing 6.b4 cxb4 and then either 7.Qg4, or 7.Nb5 bxa3+ 8.c3 Bc7 9.Bxa3 and White has the upper hand.

=== White's fifth-move alternatives ===
- 5.Qg4
- 5.dxc5
- 5.Nf3
- 5.Bd2, avoiding the doubled pawns and making possible 6.Nb5, where the knight may hop into d6 or simply defend d4.

=== Black's fourth-move alternatives ===
- 4...Ne7, although this move usually transposes to the main line.
- 4...b6 followed by ...Ba6, or 4...Qd7 with the idea of meeting 5.Qg4 with 5...f5. Theory currently prefers White's chances in both lines.

=== White's fourth-move alternatives ===
- 4.exd5 exd5 transposes to a line of the Exchange Variation where White may aim to prove that Black's bishop on b4 is misplaced.
- 4.Ne2 is the Alekhine Gambit. The main line is 4...dxe4 5.a3, followed by either 5...Be7 6.Nxe4, returning the pawn, or 5...Bxc3+ 6.Nxc3 Nc6, holding on to the pawn.
- 4.Bd3, defending e4.
- 4.a3 Bxc3+ 5.bxc3 dxe4 6.Qg4, another attempt to exploit Black's weakness on g7.
- 4.Bd2, an old move sometimes played by Rashid Nezhmetdinov, notably against Mikhail Tal

== Rubinstein Variation: 3.Nc3 dxe4 4.Nxe4 ==
Position: a8 black rook, b8 black knight, c8 black bishop, d8 black queen, e8 black king, f8 black bishop, g8 black knight, h8 black rook, a7 black pawn, b7 black pawn, c7 black pawn, f7 black pawn, g7 black pawn, h7 black pawn, e6 black pawn, d4 white pawn, e4 white knight, a2 white pawn, b2 white pawn, c2 white pawn, f2 white pawn, g2 white pawn, h2 white pawn, a1 white rook, c1 white bishop, d1 white queen, e1 white king, f1 white bishop, g1 white knight, h1 white rook

Rubinstein Variation after 3...dxe4 4.Nxe4

This variation is named after Akiba Rubinstein and can also arise from a different move order: 3.Nd2 dxe4. White has freer development and more space in the centre, which Black intends to neutralise by playing c7–c5 at some point. This solid line has undergone a modest revival, featuring in many grandmaster games as a drawing weapon but theory still gives White a slight edge. After 3...dxe4 4.Nxe4, Black has the following options:

=== Main line: 4.Nxe4 Nd7 ===
The most frequent high-level exponent of the 4...Nd7 variation is Georg Meier. Play might proceed 5.Nf3 Ngf6 6.Nxf6+ Nxf6, where Black is ready for ...c5.

=== Fort Knox Variation: 4.Nxe4 Bd7 5.Nf3 Bc6 ===
4...Bd7 5.Nf3 Bc6, the Fort Knox Variation, activates the light-square bishop. It is often played by Alexander Rustemov.

== Other replies to 3.Nc3 ==
- 3...Nc6 is the Hecht Reefschlager Variation, a name coined by John Watson. This sideline has been played by Aron Nimzowitsch and many other players. It usually continues 4.Nf3 Nf6, with the idea of 5.e5 Ne4. German International Master Helmut Reefschlaeger has been fond of this move.
- 3...c6 is known as the Paulsen Variation. It can also be reached via a Caro–Kann Defence move order (1.e4 c6 2.d4 d5 3.Nc3 e6).
- 3...c5 is a line advocated by Frank Marshall. It is considered theoretically suspect and is a rare sideline today. It was the opening of the famous game Levitsky versus Marshall, also known as the Gold Coins Game.
- Quieter moves such as 3...Be7, 3...a6, and 3...h6 see occasional play.

== Tarrasch Variation: 3.Nd2 ==
Position: a8 black rook, b8 black knight, c8 black bishop, d8 black queen, e8 black king, f8 black bishop, h8 black rook, a7 black pawn, b7 black pawn, c7 black pawn, f7 black pawn, g7 black pawn, h7 black pawn, e6 black pawn, f6 black knight, d5 black pawn, d4 white pawn, e4 white pawn, a2 white pawn, b2 white pawn, c2 white pawn, d2 white knight, f2 white pawn, g2 white pawn, h2 white pawn, a1 white rook, c1 white bishop, d1 white queen, e1 white king, f1 white bishop, g1 white knight, h1 white rook

Tarrasch Variation after 3.Nd2 Nf6

The Tarrasch Variation is named after Siegbert Tarrasch. This move became particularly popular during the 1970s and early 1980s when Anatoly Karpov used it to great effect. Though less aggressive than 3.Nc3, it is still used by top-level players seeking a small, safe advantage.

Like 3.Nc3, 3.Nd2 protects e4, but is different in several key respects: it does not block White's c-pawn from advancing, which means c3 can be played at some point to support the d4-pawn. Hence, it avoids the Winawer Variation as 3...Bb4 is now readily answered by 4.c3. On the other hand, 3.Nd2 develops the knight to an arguably less active square than 3.Nc3, and in addition, it hems in White's dark-square bishop. Hence, White will typically have to spend an extra tempo moving the knight from d2 at some point before developing said bishop.

In response, Black tends to play 3...c5 or 3...Nf6. 3...Be7, 3...Nc6, 3...a6, and 3...dxe4 also all see significant play.

=== Open Variation: 3...c5 ===
After 3...c5, White's most common move is 4.exd5, followed by 4.Ngf3. 4.c3 is possible, but after 4...cxd4 5.cxd4 dxe4 6.Nxe4 Nf6, the position is judged as holding no advantage for White.

==== 4.exd5 exd5 ====
4...exd5 was a staple of many old Karpov–Korchnoi battles, including seven games in their 1974 FIDE Candidates match. It usually leads to Black having an isolated queen's pawn (see isolated pawn). The main line continues 5.Ngf3 Nc6 6.Bb5 Bd6 7.0-0 Nge7 8.dxc5 Bxc5 9.Nb3 Bb6 with a position where, if White can neutralise the activity of Black's pieces in the middlegame, he will have a slight advantage in the ending. Another possibility for White is 5.Bb5+ Bd7 (5...Nc6 is also possible) 6.Qe2+ Be7 7.dxc5 to trade off the bishops and make it more difficult for Black to regain the pawn.

==== 4.exd5 Qxd5 ====
4...Qxd5 is an important alternative for Black; the idea is to trade off the c- and d-pawns for White's d- and e-pawns, leaving Black with an extra centre pawn. This constitutes a slight structural advantage, but in return White gains time for development by harassing Black's queen. This interplay of static and dynamic advantages is the reason why this line has become popular in the last decade. Play usually continues 5.Ngf3 cxd4 6.Bc4 Qd6 7.0-0 Nf6 (preventing 8.Ne4) 8.Nb3 Nc6 9.Nbxd4 Nxd4, and here White may stay in the middlegame with 10.Nxd4 or offer the trade of queens with 10.Qxd4, with the former far more commonly played today.

==== 4.Ngf3 ====
4.Ngf3 has been played by Paul Keres and Max Euwe, and retains significant use. Transposing to the lines beginning with 4.exd5 is common; for example, 4.Ngf3 cxd4 5.exd5 Qxd5 transposes to the 4.exd5 Qxd5 line. After 4...cxd4 5.Nxd4, a line continuing 5...Nc6 6.Bb5 Bd7 7.Nxc6 bxc6 8.Bd3 is common, or Black may opt for 5...Nf6.

=== Closed Variation: 3...Nf6 ===
While the objective of 3...c5 was to break open the centre, 3...Nf6 aims to close it. After 4.e5 Nfd7 5.Bd3 c5 6.c3 Nc6 (6...b6 intends ...Ba6 next to get rid of Black's "bad" light-square bishop, a recurring idea in the French) 7.Ne2 (leaving f3 open for the queen's knight) 7...cxd4 8.cxd4 f6 9.exf6 Nxf6 10.Nf3 Bd6 Black has freed his pieces at the cost of having a backward pawn on e6. White may also choose to preserve his pawn on e5 by playing 4.e5 Nfd7 5.c3 c5 6.f4 Nc6 7.Ndf3, but his development is slowed as a result, and Black will gain dynamic chances if he can open the position to advantage.

=== Morozevich Variation: 3...Be7 ===
3...Be7 is known as the Morozevich Variation, after GM Alexander Morozevich. A fashionable line among top grandmasters in recent years, this move aims to prove that every White move now has its drawbacks, e.g. after 4.Ngf3 Nf6 5.e5 Nfd7 White cannot play f4, whereas 4.Bd3 c5 5.dxc5 Nf6 and 4.e5 c5 5. Qg4 Kf8!? lead to obscure complications. 3...h6?!, with a similar rationale, has also gained some adventurous followers in recent years, including by Morozevich.

=== Other lines ===
- 3...Nc6 is known as the Guimard Variation. After 4.Ngf3 Nf6 5.e5 Nd7 Black will exchange White's cramping e-pawn next move by ...f6. However, Black does not exert any pressure on d4 because ...c5 cannot be played, so White should maintain a slight advantage with 6.Be2 or 6 Nb3.
- 3...a6 is an uncommon modern line which gained some popularity in the 1970s. Similar to 3...Be7, the idea is to play a waiting move to make White declare his intentions before Black commits to a plan of his own. 3...a6 also controls the b5-square, which is typically useful for Black in most French lines because, for example, White no longer has the option of playing Bb5.
- 3...dxe4 enters the Rubinstein Variation. It can be played to avoid theory specific to the Tarrasch Variation.

== Advance Variation: 3.e5 ==
Position: a8 black rook, c8 black bishop, d8 black queen, e8 black king, f8 black bishop, g8 black knight, h8 black rook, a7 black pawn, b7 black pawn, f7 black pawn, g7 black pawn, h7 black pawn, c6 black knight, e6 black pawn, c5 black pawn, d5 black pawn, e5 white pawn, d4 white pawn, c3 white pawn, f3 white knight, a2 white pawn, b2 white pawn, f2 white pawn, g2 white pawn, h2 white pawn, a1 white rook, b1 white knight, c1 white bishop, d1 white queen, e1 white king, f1 white bishop, h1 white rook

Advance Variation after 3.e5 c5 4.c3 Nc6 5.Nf3

The main line of the Advance Variation continues 3...c5 4.c3 Nc6 5.Nf3. There are then several common fifth moves for Black; 5...Qb6 is the most common, followed by 5...Bd7.

After 5...Qb6, the idea is to increase the pressure on d4 and eventually undermine the white centre. The queen also attacks the b2-square, so White's dark-square bishop cannot easily defend the d4-pawn without losing the b2-pawn. White's most common replies are 6.a3, 6.Be2, and 6.Bd3.

=== Main line: 3...c5 4.c3 Nc6 5.Nf3 Qb6 6.a3 ===
6.a3 is currently the most important line in the Advance: it prepares 7.b4, gaining space on the queenside. Black may prevent this with 6...c4, intending to take en passant if White plays b4, which creates a closed game where Black fights for control of the b3-square. A possible line is 6.a3 c4 7.Nbd2 Na5 8.Rb1 Bd7 and Black has a firm grip on b3 square.

Alternatively, Black may continue developing with 6...Nh6, intending ...Nf5, which might seem strange as White can double the pawn with Bxh6, but this is actually considered good for Black. Black plays ...Bg7 and ...0-0 and Black's king has adequate defence and White will miss the apparently 'bad' dark-square bishop.

6...Bd7, 6...a5, and 6...f6 also see significant play.

=== 6.Be2 ===
6.Be2 is the main alternative to 6.a3, aiming simply to castle and avoid the complications following 6.a3 c4. Once again, a common Black response is 6...Nh6 intending 7...cxd4 8.cxd4 Nf5 attacking d4. White usually responds to this threat with 7.Bxh6 or 7.b3 preparing Bb2.

=== Milner-Barry Gambit: 6.Bd3 ===
6.Bd3 is the Milner-Barry Gambit. The main line continues 6...cxd4 7.cxd4 Bd7 (7...Nxd4?? 8.Nxd4 Qxd4 9.Bb5+, winning Black's queen) 8.0-0 Nxd4 9.Nxd4 Qxd4 10.Nc3. If Black continues 10...Qxe5, White gains an attack with 11.Re1 Qb8 12.Nxd5 or 11...Qd6 12.Nb5.

=== Euwe Variation: 5...Bd7 ===
5...Bd7 was mentioned by Greco as early as 1620. It is known as the Euwe Variation and was popularised by Viktor Korchnoi in the 1970s. Now a main line, the idea behind the move is that since Black usually plays ...Bd7 eventually, he plays it at once and waits for White to show his hand. If White continues 6.a3, modern theory says that Black at least equalises after 6...f6! The lines are complex, but the main point is that a3 is a wasted move if the black queen is not on b6 and so Black uses the extra tempo to attack White's centre immediately. Common continuations after 5...Bd7 are 6.Be2 or 6.dxc5 (6.Bb5? is immediately refuted by 6...Nxe5).

=== Others ===
- 5...Nh6 has recently become a popular alternative; the idea is that 6.Bxh6 gxh6 gains Black a semi-open g-file to attack the White king, or Black can play ...Bg7 to support ...f6 to attack White's pawn on e5. If White doesn't take the knight, it will move to f5 to pressure d4, or (after ...f6) to f7 to pressure e5.
- 4...Qb6, intending 5.Nf3 Bd7, plans 6...Bb5 to trade off the "bad" queen's bishop.
- 3...Bd7 or 4...Bd7 can also be played with the same plan.
- 3...b6 intends to fianchetto the bad French bishop, which can transpose to Owen's Defence.

== Exchange Variation: 3.exd5 ==
Position: a8 black rook, b8 black knight, c8 black bishop, d8 black queen, e8 black king, f8 black bishop, g8 black knight, h8 black rook, a7 black pawn, b7 black pawn, c7 black pawn, f7 black pawn, g7 black pawn, h7 black pawn, d5 black pawn, d4 white pawn, a2 white pawn, b2 white pawn, c2 white pawn, f2 white pawn, g2 white pawn, h2 white pawn, a1 white rook, b1 white knight, c1 white bishop, d1 white queen, e1 white king, f1 white bishop, g1 white knight, h1 white rook

Exchange Variation after 3.exd5 exd5

Many players who begin with 1.e4 find that the French Defence is the most difficult opening for them to play against due to the closed structure and unique strategies of the system. Thus, many players choose to play the Exchange so that the position becomes simpler and more clearcut. White makes no effort to exploit the advantage of the first move, and has often chosen this line with expectation of an early draw, and indeed draws often occur if neither side breaks the symmetry. An extreme example was Capablanca–Maróczy, Lake Hopatcong 1926, which went: 4.Bd3 Bd6 5.Nf3 Nf6 6.0-0 0-0 7.Bg5 Bg4 8.Re1 Nbd7 9.Nbd2 c6 10.c3 Qc7 11.Qc2 Rfe8 12.Bh4 Bh5 13.Bg3 Bxg3 14.hxg3 Bg6 15.Rxe8+ Rxe8 16.Bxg6 hxg6 17.Re1 Rxe1+ 18.Nxe1 Ne8 19.Nd3 Nd6 20.Qb3 a6 21.Kf1 ½–½.

Despite the symmetrical pawn structure, White cannot force a draw. An obsession with obtaining one sometimes results in embarrassment for White, as in Tatai–Korchnoi, Beer Sheva 1978, which continued 4.Bd3 c5!? 5.Nf3 Nc6 6.Qe2+ Be7 7.dxc5 Nf6 8.h3 0-0 9.0-0 Bxc5 10.c3 Re8 11.Qc2 Qd6 12.Nbd2 Qg3 13.Bf5 Re2 14.Nd4 Nxd4 0–1. A less extreme example was Gurevich–Short, Manila 1990 where White, a strong Russian GM, played openly for the draw but was ground down by Short in 42 moves.

To create genuine winning chances, White will often play c2–c4 at some stage to put pressure on Black's d5-pawn. Black can give White an isolated queen's pawn by capturing on c4, but this gives White's pieces greater freedom, which may lead to attacking chances. This occurs in lines such as 3.exd5 exd5 4.c4 (played by GMs Normunds Miezis and Maurice Ashley) and 4.Nf3 Bd6 5.c4, which may transpose to the Petroff. Conversely, if White declines to do this, Black may play c7–c5 himself, e.g. 4.Bd3 c5, as in the above-cited Tatai–Korchnoi game.

If c2–c4 is not played, White and Black have two main piece setups. White may put his pieces on Nf3, Bd3, Bg5 (pinning the black knight), Nc3, Qd2 or the queen's knight can go to d2 instead and White can support the centre with c3 and perhaps play Qb3. Conversely, when the queen's knight is on c3, the king's knight may go to e2 when the enemy bishop and knight can be kept out of the key squares e4 and g4 by f3. When the knight is on c3 in the first and last of the above strategies, White may choose either short or long castling. The positions are so symmetrical that the options and strategies are the same for both sides.

Another way to unbalance the position is for White or Black to castle on opposite sides of the board. An example of this is the line 4.Bd3 Nc6 5.c3 Bd6 6.Nf3 Bg4 7.0-0 Nge7 8.Re1 Qd7 9.Nbd2 0-0-0.

== Early deviations ==
Besides the main lines described above, there are a few other lines which can arise after 1.e4 e6.

=== Alternatives to 2.d4 ===
White can try other ideas besides 2.d4:

- 2.d3 is usually played with the idea of adopting a King's Indian Attack setup after 2...d5 3.Nd2 (or 3.Qe2). It has been used by many leading players over the years, including GMs Pal Benko, Bobby Fischer, Leonid Stein, and Lev Psakhis. White will likely play Ngf3, g3, Bg2, 0-0, c3 and/or Re1 in some order on the next few moves. Black may combat this setup with 3...c5 followed by ...Nc6, ...Nf6, ...Be7, and ...0-0; developing the kingside by ...Bd6 and ...Nge7 is also playable. 3...Nf6 4.Ngf3 Nc6 plans ...dxe4 and ...e5 to block in the Bg2, and 3...Nf6 4.Ngf3 b6 makes ...Ba6 possible if White's light-square bishop leaves the a6–f1 diagonal. Black may defer ...d5, and play 2...c5 and 3...Nc6, developing the kingside by ...g6, ...Bg7, and ...Nge7, or less commonly, by ...Nf6, ...Be7, and (if White's knight goes to d2) ...d6.
- 2.f4 is the La Bourdonnais Variation, named after Louis-Charles Mahé de La Bourdonnais, the 19th-century French master. Play can continue 2...d5 3. e5 c5 4. Nf3 Nc6 5.c3 Nge7 6.Na3 Nf5.
- 2.Qe2 is the Chigorin Variation, which discourages 2...d5 because after 3.exd5 the black pawn is pinned, meaning Black would need to recapture with the queen. Black usually replies 2...c5, after which play can resemble the 2.d3 variation or the Closed Variation of the Sicilian Defence.
- 2.Nf3 d5 3.Nc3 is the Two Knights Variation: 3...d4 and 3...Nf6 are good replies for Black.
- 2.c4 (attempting to discourage 2...d5 by Black) is the Steiner Variation. But Black can reply 2...d5 anyway, when after 3.cxd5 exd5 4.exd5 Nf6 the only way for White to hold on to his extra pawn on d5 is to play 5.Bb5+. Black gets good compensation in return for the pawn, however.
- 2.Bb5 was introduced by Henry Bird during the Vienna 1873 chess tournament, but has been little played since then. Both 2...a6 and 2...c6 are satisfactory for Black. If 2...Qg5!? (Bird-Fleissig from the Vienna tournament) 3.Bf1, Black's best move may well be 3...Qd8, otherwise the queen will be a target for White's pieces.
- 2.b3 leads to the Réti Gambit after 2...d5 3.Bb2 dxe4, but Black can also decline it with 3...Nf6 4.e5 Nd7 with White going for f4 and Qg4 before putting the knight on f3.
- 2.e5 is the Steinitz Attack. It offers no advantage to White after 2...d6; alternatively 2...d5 3.d4 transposes into the Advance Variation.

=== Alternatives to 2...d5 ===
Although 2...d5 is the most consistent move after 1.e4 e6 2.d4, there are a few side lines.

- 2...c5, the Franco-Benoni Defence, is so-called because it features the c7–c5 push characteristic of the Benoni Defence. White may continue 3.d5, when play can transpose into the Benoni, though White has extra options since c2–c4 is not mandated. 3.Nf3 now transposes into a main line Sicilian Defence with 2...e6, while 3.c3 transposes into a line of the Alapin Sicilian (usually arrived at after 1.e4 c5 2.c3 e6 3.d4), which may in turn transpose back into the French after 3...d5.
- 2...b6 transposes into Owen's Defence or the English Defence.
- 2...f5, the Franco-Hiva Gambit, is regarded as dubious.
- 2...d6 is a version of the Lengfellner System, in which Black begins the game with e7–e6 and d7–d6 regardless of the opponent's moves. (White can also play the Lengfellner System by opening e2–e3 and d2–d3.) The Lengfellner System is usually adopted by players who wish to reach a stable position while avoiding opening theory.

=== Other replies to 2...d5 ===
There are also a few rare continuations after 1.e4 e6 2.d4 d5.

- 3.Bd3 is the Schlechter Variation.
- 3.Be3 is the Alapin Gambit.
- 3.c4 is the Diemer–Duhm Gambit, which can also be reached via the Queen's Gambit Declined.

== ECO codes ==
The Encyclopaedia of Chess Openings includes an alphanumeric classification system for openings that is widely used in chess literature. Codes C00 to C19 are the French Defence, broken up in the following way (all apart from C00 start with the moves 1.e4 e6 2.d4 d5):

- C00: 1.e4 e6 without 2.d4, or 2.d4 without 2...d5 (early deviations)
- C01: 2.d4 d5 (includes the Exchange Variation, 3.exd5)
- C02: 3.e5 (Advance Variation)
- C03: 3.Nd2 (includes 3...Be7; C03–C09 cover the Tarrasch Variation)
- C04: 3.Nd2 Nc6 (Guimard Variation)
- C05: 3.Nd2 Nf6
- C06: 3.Nd2 Nf6 4.e5 Nfd7 5.Bd3
- C07: 3.Nd2 c5 (includes 4.exd5 Qxd5)
- C08: 3.Nd2 c5 4.exd5 exd5
- C09: 3.Nd2 c5 4.exd5 exd5 5.Ngf3 Nc6
- C10: 3.Nc3 (includes the Rubinstein Variation, 3...dxe4)
- C11: 3.Nc3 Nf6 (includes the Steinitz Variation, 4.e5; C11–C14 cover the Classical Variation)
- C12: 3.Nc3 Nf6 4.Bg5 (includes the McCutcheon Variation, 4...Bb4)
- C13: 3.Nc3 Nf6 4.Bg5 dxe4 (Burn Variation)
- C14: 3.Nc3 Nf6 4.Bg5 Be7
- C15: 3.Nc3 Bb4 (C15–C19 cover the Winawer Variation)
- C16: 3.Nc3 Bb4 4.e5
- C17: 3.Nc3 Bb4 4.e5 c5
- C18: 3.Nc3 Bb4 4.e5 c5 5.a3 (includes the Armenian Variation, 5...Ba5)
- C19: 3.Nc3 Bb4 4 e5 c5 5.a3 Bxc3+ 6.bxc3 Ne7 7.Nf3 and 7.a4

== See also ==
- List of chess openings
- List of chess openings named after places
