= Patrick Dahlemann =

German politician (born 1988)

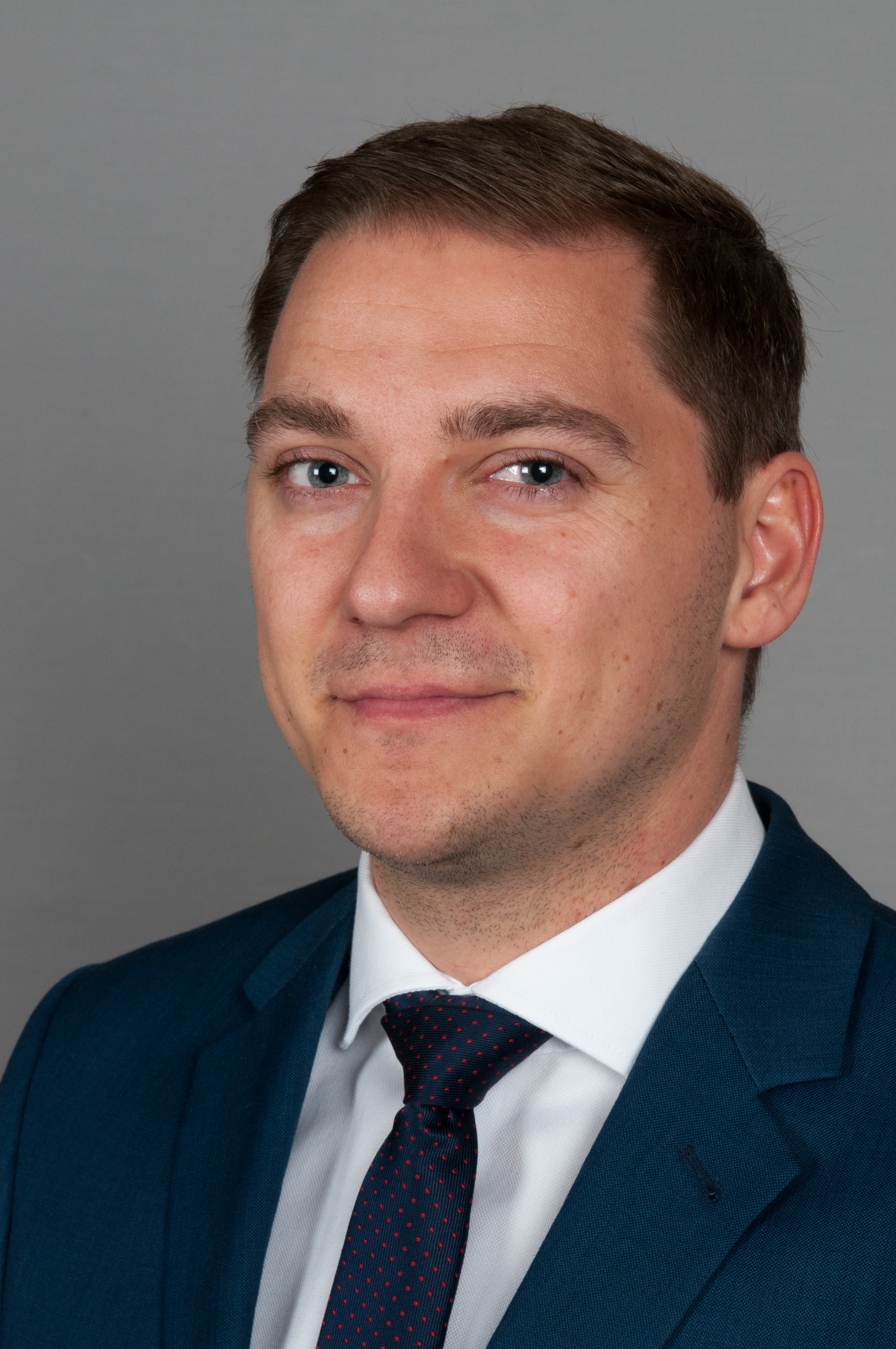
- Dahlemann in 2017

Member of the Landtag of Mecklenburg-Vorpommern
- Incumbent
- Assumed office 9 April 2014
- Preceded by: Volker Schlotmann

Personal details
- Born: 18 July 1988 (age 37) Pasewalk
- Party: Social Democratic Party (since 2004)

Patrick Dahlemann (born 18 July 1988 in Pasewalk) is a German politician serving as head of the state chancellery of Mecklenburg-Vorpommern since 2021. He has been a member of the Landtag of Mecklenburg-Vorpommern since 2014.
