= Oskar Picht =

German teacher

Oskar Picht (27 May 1871 – 15 August 1945) was a German teacher, who invented the first braille typewriter for blind people.

== Life ==
Oskar Picht was the son of the master baker Wilhelm Picht and his wife Hermine. His birthplace, at Marktstrasse 3 in Pasewalk, was destroyed in April 1945. He attended the town school in Pasewalk and later the higher boys' school. From 1886 to 1891 he studied at the state teacher training college in Pölitz.

From 1891 Picht taught for three years in Marienthal, then in Bahn in the Greifenhagen district. He then decided to become a teacher for the blind, and studied from 1897 to 1899 at the State Institute for the Blind in Berlin-Steglitz. After his training he worked there for several years.

In 1899, Picht developed the first usable German braille sheet-fed machine, for which he received the first utility model on 6 May 1901. By 1932, Picht had registered nine more models.

On 24 April 1902, Picht married Margarete Charlotte Conrad, with whom he had three children.

In 1910 he developed the first German braille stenography machine, which used rolled paper strips. In either 1910 or 1912 (sources differ) Picht became director of the Provincial Institute for the Blind in Bromberg, and from 1920 to 1933 he was director of the State Institute for the Blind in Berlin-Steglitz. In 1924 he was the first German to give a radio lecture on blindness. He produced the first film about the blind, Our Blind and Their World. After retiring, Picht lived initially in Schloßstraße in Steglitz and moved to the Potsdam-Rehbrücke blind home at the end of 1944.

Oskar Picht died at the age of 74. His final resting place is in the cemetery of the Brandenburg municipality of Nuthetal in the district of Bergholz-Rehbrücke, where there is an honorary gravestone.

== Posthumously ==
Between 5 and 6 June 2024, the Oskar Picht bronze bust, which had been located at the entrance portal of the Oskar Picht Gymnasium in Pasewalk since 1998, was stolen by unknown metal thieves.

On 23 September 2024, Picht was the subject of a Google Doodle in the UK, Germany, Poland and some South American countries.
