= Paul von Werner =

Austrian soldier who later fought for Prussia

Johann Paul von Werner
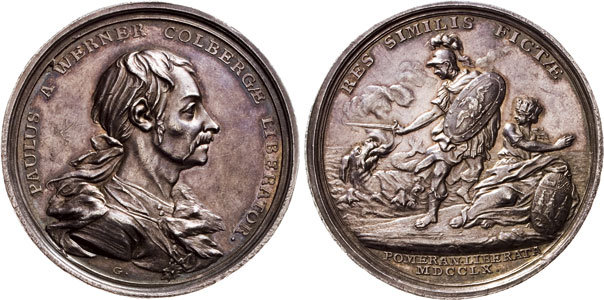
- Memorial coin struck with Werner's image by Frederick the Great
- Born: 11 December 1707; Raab, Hungary
- Died: 25 October 1785 (aged 77); Tost
- Military career
- Allegiance: (Holy Roman Empire) Austria; Prussia
- Branch: Austrian Army; Prussian Army
- Service years: 1723–1750 (Austria); 1751–1780 (Prussia)
- Rank: Generalleutnant
- Commands: Hussar Regiment No 6 (Brown Hussar Regiment)
- Conflicts: War of the Polish Succession; Russo-Turkish War (1735–1739); War of the Austrian Succession; Seven Years' War; War of the Bavarian Succession
- Awards: Pour le Merite; Equestrian statue of Frederick the Great

Johann Paul von Werner (11 December 1707 – 25 January 1785) was chief of the Prussian Hussar Regiment No. 6 (Brown Hussars); he also received the Prussian Order Pour le Mérite. Initially in Austrian service, he fought against Spain, France, the Ottoman Empire and against Prussia. One of Frederick the Great's trusted diplomats, Hans Karl von Winterfeldt, recruited him into Prussian service in 1750; subsequently, he fought for Prussia against the Austrians in the Seven Years' War and the War of Bavarian Succession. He was wounded once, and taken prisoner several times. The Prussian playwright Gotthold Lessing modeled the character of the sergeant in his Minna von Barnhelm on Werner.

== Imperial service ==
Born on 11 December 1707 in Raab, Hungary, Paul von Werner entered Habsburg imperial service in 1723 and became a cornet in the hussar regiment of Franz Leopold von Nádasdy in 1731, a lieutenant in 1733 and Rittmeister (captain of cavalry) in 1734. During his time with the imperial army, he participated in eight campaigns against Spain, eight against France, six against the Turks and four against Prussia. He was taken prisoner during the Battle of Bitonto in 1734, and fought in the Battle of Banja Luka (1737) and the Battle of Grocka (1739).

In August 1741, Field Marshal Count Neipperg sent a petition to the Hofkriegsrat, asking for a promotion for Werner but it was refused. During the War of Austrian Succession, Werner continued as a Rittmeister, first at Battle of Mollwitz (1741) and subsequently in the Battle of Chotusitz (1742). In the Second Silesian War, he fought in the Battle of Soor in 1745, in the Battle of Roucoux in 1746 and the Battle of Lauffeldt in 1747. Despite his length of service and his unquestionable success as a soldier, he saw many men promoted to major ahead of him. During the fighting on the Rhine, he received a foot wound, his only serious injury during his long military career. In 1747, when he asked for a transfer to another regiment, Nádasdy reported that he was not fit. Werner interpreted this as meaning that he was not religiously fit because he was a Lutheran in the predominantly Catholic Austrian service.

Dissatisfaction with his lack of career progress extended throughout the war between Austria and Prussia and opened the door for other opportunities. These probably occurred during a spa stay in Karlsbad, where he met Prussian General Hans Karl von Winterfeldt. Winterfeldt fell into conversation with Werner and, during the course of it, learned of Werner's dissatisfaction with his lack of career advancement. Ever the opportunist, Winterfeld reported to King Frederick that Werner, at the beginning of the First Campaign of the Silesian Wars, had made a coup when, with 60 Hussars, he had routed several larger units. Subsequently, Werner entered Prussian service in 1750, where experienced soldiers were accepted regardless of religion.

== Prussian service ==
Upon entry in Prussian service, Werner's career advancement became more regular. On 3 December 1751, Werner became a lieutenant colonel in the Brown Hussars Regiment No. 6 and in December 1752 he commanded the squadron formerly led by Lieutenant Colonel Otto Ernst von Gersdorf. By 1756 he was second in commend of the Brown Hussars in the army of Feldmarschall Kurt Christoph, Graf von Schwerin, who greatly appreciated Werner's prudence and vigilance.

=== Seven Years' War ===
Werner's first assignment in the Seven Years' War was to advance with 300 riders from Glatz around the rear of the Austrian army commanded by Octavio Piccolomini. During the invasion of Bohemia, he distinguished himself in the Battle of Schleissitz. In February 1757 he became Inhaber (Proprietor) of the Brown Hussars and, in the Battle of Prague, he was part of the left wing reserve commanded by Hans Joachim von Zieten. In the final attack of the reserve, Werner's regiment formed the lead. In the Battle of Kolin, he was again on the left wing. After the battle, he was sent to Lausitz to join the army of the Duke of Bevern. Here, in action at Klettendorf, he routed two Croatian battalions. On 22 November 1757, at the Battle of Breslau, he was again on the left wing under Hans Joachim von Zieten, where he fought in the area of Kleinburg.

In the Battle of Leuthen, he was able to defeat and disperse the enemy outposts commanded by General von Nostitz, including two Saxon and two Austrian hussar regiments. In September 1758, he was promoted to generalmajor and awarded the Order Pour le Mérite. In October, the Habsburg General Karl Marquis de Ville laid siege to the Neisse fortress. Werner was part of the relief troops and he was able to break through Russian and Habsburg lines in the Battle of Landskrone. He then went to Kosel, which was also besieged. In the spring of 1759 he was able to drive General de Ville from Silesia. In August 1760, he was part of the relief army of Prince Henry for Dresden; on the way he defeated the Dragoon regiment Prince Joseph. For this he received from Frederick II the appointment as a provost in the cathedral at Minden and an endowment of 2,000 thalers. He was subsequently given the command of his own corps, and sent to relieve the besieged fortress of Kolberg. He marched the 382 kilometers (237 mi) from Glogau to Kolberg from 5 to 18 September and upon arrival, he surprised the Russians by attacking immediately. The Russians were routed, fled their camp in a panic, and withdrew toward Russia. For this victory, he was memorialized on a commemorative coin. Werner received gold and twenty silver coins from the King. Subsequently, though, he was less successful: on 3 October 1760 at the Battle of Pasewalk, in Vorpommern-Greifswald, his troops attempted to storm the town and, although they took many prisoners during their attack on the redoubts, when darkness fell, Werner ordered his troops to withdraw.

On 20 February 1761, the King promoted Werner to generalleutnant. On 3 September 1761, he captured a Swedish position at the village of Uckerland, taking eight guns and 600 prisoners. In 1761, he joined the army of the Prince of Wurttemberg, which was to resume efforts to relieve the besieged fortress of Kolberg but had hardly any supplies. In September 1761, Werner rode from Platens to meet the Russian troops moving westward from Poland. On 12 September, he fought with 2,000 men against the Russians at Treptow on the Riga river. After heavy losses, he was captured by the Russians and imprisoned in Königsberg, where he remained until the end of 1762. When Peter III became Tsar, he freed Werner, but tried to convince him to join the Russian army. Werner returned to Frederick's army in Silesia. There he again became commander of a corps, which first marched from Upper Silesia to Moravia, then joined the army the Duke of Bevern at Peterswalde in Lower Silesia. On 16 August 1762, he and Zieten routed an army of 47,000 commanded by Leopold Joseph von Daun near Reichenbach. He then moved back to Upper Silesia. After the war, Werner became the commander of Naugarten.

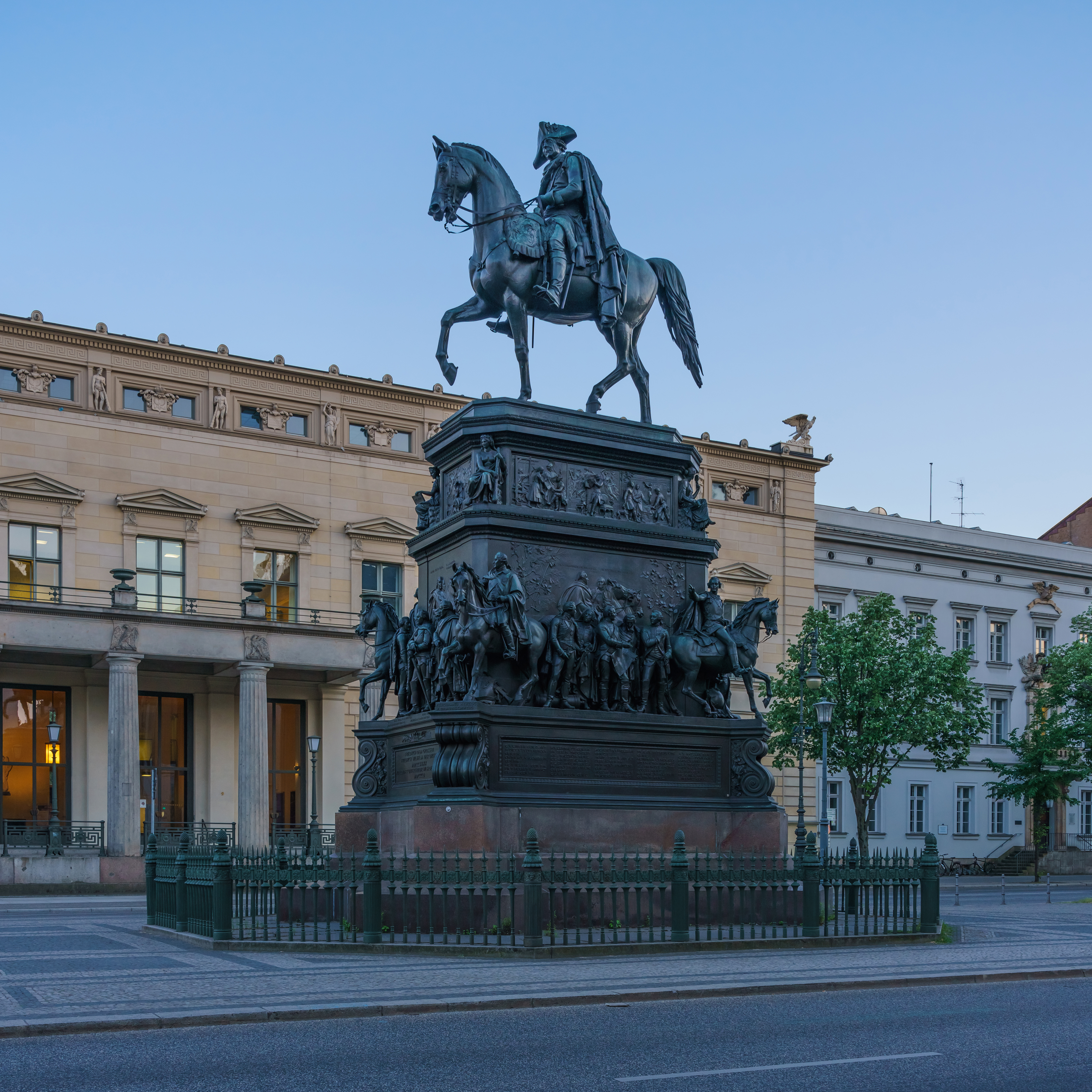
Werner was memorialized on The Equestrian Statue of Frederick the Great.

=== War of Bavarian Succession ===
In War of Bavarian Succession, Werner commanded an observation army, which was reinforced by Lieutenant General Joachim Friedrich von Stutterheim until the arrival of the Duke of Brunswick, when the two of them shared the command. The greatest combat he experienced in this uneventful war was a skirmish at Teschen.

== Post-military life ==
Gotthold Lessing modeled the character of the sergeant in his Minna von Barnhelm on von Werner: the character's name was even Paul Werner. The play was a characteristic Soldatenstücke (soldier play) popular in the latter half of the 18th century - until today. In one amateur production a young Johann Wolfgang von Goethe played the part of Werner.

Werner died on 25 January 1785 on his Gut Bitschin estate, near Toszek, which he had bought in 1783. He was buried in the Franciscan monastery in Gliwice. His service was immortalized in 1851 on one of the honorary plates on the Equestrian statue of Frederick the Great, erected by the King's great great nephew, Frederick William IV.

== Family ==
Werner's parents were the Habsburg lieutenant colonel Johann Paul of Werner and his wife, Marie Katharina von Streit. He married Maria Dorothea Apollonia of Shimonsky on 29 August 1756. Her father was Ludwig Jaroslav of Schimonskym, Lord of Prisowitz and Pojanow. Only one of Werner's five sons survived him: August Albrecht Joseph Ludwig Karl (born 23 January 1763).
