= Armand Blackmar =

American music publisher (1826–1888)

Armand Edward Blackmar, was born in Vermont in 1826, to parents Reuben Harmon and Amanda (Cushman) Blackmar. Armand, with his brother, Henry, was the founder of Blackmar Brothers, a music publishing company. Begun in 1860, this publishing company was originally based out of New Orleans, Louisiana, and later Augusta, Georgia. This would become the most successful publisher of music of the Confederacy during American Civil War, issuing about half the songs released during that era. A.E. was best known for the patriotic songs he wrote.

Armand and Henry were music teachers before entering the publishing business. During the contentious Civil War years, Armand Edward also worked as a lawyer in New Orleans.

When Northern troops took over the city of New Orleans, Henry Blackmar moved the business to Augusta, while Armand — due to his Northern accent — managed to continue working out of New Orleans for a time, but a Union raid on his business forced him to cease working. He continued to live in Louisiana and published songs of his own, under a pseudonym, through his brother.

Blackmar's published work included, among others: The Bonnie Blue Flag; Dixie War Song (arranged and published); (State Song) Maryland! My Maryland!; Southern Marseillaise; and The Beauregard Manassas.

Henry Blackmar continued to operate the Blackmar publishing house out of Augusta, Georgia, extending their distribution chain throughout the South. Following the Civil War, Armand continued to publish music and sell it in several sites in the United States. He returned to New Orleans and re-opened a music store there. His brother Henry operated a music store of his own that was also located in New Orleans.

In 1881 and 1882, A.E. Blackmar created Blackmar's Gambit, a chess opening, and published his work in the July 1882 issue of Brentano's Chess.

Armand died on 28 October 1888, several years after returning to New Orleans.

Armand Edward Blackmar was married to Margaret Bridget Meara of New Orleans, Louisiana.
