= Hund (surname) =

Hund (meaning dog) is a Germanic surname that may refer to the following notable people:

- Barbara Hund (born 1959), German-Swiss chess grandmaster, daughter of Juliane and Gerhard
- Friedrich Hund (1896–1997), German physicist
- Gerhard Hund (1932–2024), German physicist and chess player, son of Friedrich, husband of Juliane
- Isabel Hund (born 1962), German chess player, daughter of Juliane and Gerhard, sister of Barbara
- Juliane Hund (1928-1999), German chess player
- Karl Gotthelf von Hund (1722–1776), German freemason
- Thorir Hund (born ca. 990), one of the greatest chiefs in Hålogaland, Norway
