= Hund =

Hund may refer to:

- Hund (surname)
- Hund, Khyber Pakhtunkhwa, a village in Pakistan
- Hund School, Kansas, United States
- Hund (card game), German card game
- Hund or Voller Hund, German card game
- Hund Şehzade (1422–1455), Ottoman princess

== See also ==
- Hundt, a surname
