= Claus Spahn =

German television presenter (born 1940)

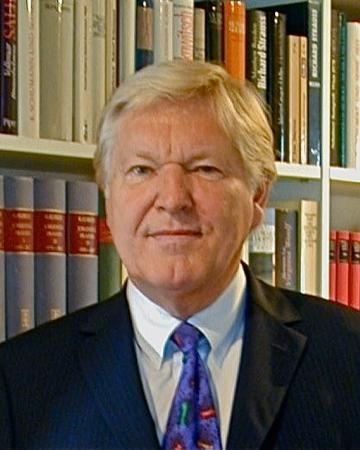
Claus Spahn, Cologne 2005

Claus Spahn (born 15 May 1940 in Bottrop, Germany) is a former TV programme editor of Germany's Westdeutscher Rundfunk (WDR) broadcasting corporation, a presenter, producer and author. He was awarded the Cross of the Order of Merit of the Federal Republic of Germany in 2001.

== Vita ==
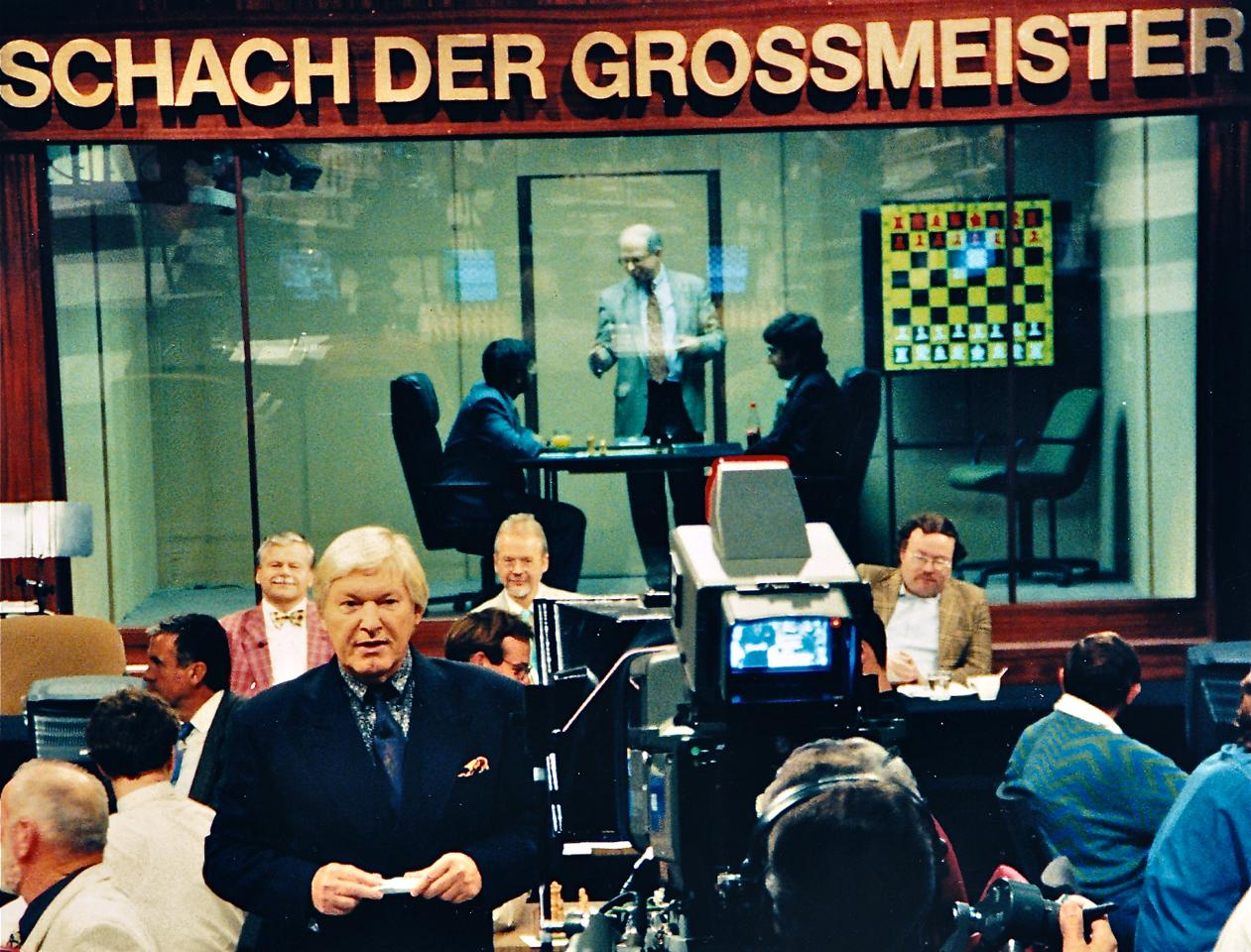
Claus Spahn presenting the Chess of the Grandmasters TV programme with Viswanathan Anand and Vladimir Kramnik in 1996. Photo: WDR.

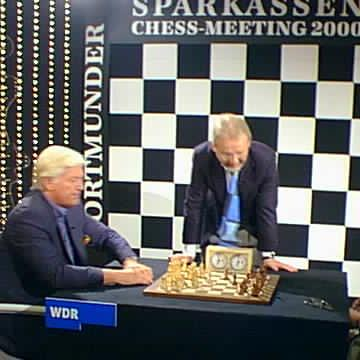
Claus Spahn and Helmut Pfleger at the 2000 Dortmund Sparkassen Chess Meeting

Spahn studied History of theatre, German language and literature, Philosophy, and History of art at the University of Cologne. He received his doctorate ('Dr. Phil.') in 1969 for his dissertation The history of the theatre of the Ruhr region up to 1933. He worked as a TV journalist for the WDR from 1969 to 2005. He produced numerous series, portraits and documentaries in the field of cultural and educational policy.

He became known both nationally and internationally through chess programmes. Between 1983 and 2005, he presented the annual live broadcast Chess of the Grandmasters (Schach der Großmeister), where players including Garry Kasparov, Anatoly Karpov, Viswanathan Anand and Vladimir Kramnik competed for the TV Cup.

It was on his initiative and under his direction that the WDR regularly reported on the Dortmund Sparkassen Chess Meeting.

== Series / Films ==
The series written and produced by Spahn included Keine Angst vorm Fliegen (Don't be afraid to fly) and Der Elternführerschein (The driving licence for parents). Together with Lida Winiewicz, Spahn wrote the 12-part TV serial Wenn die Liebe hinfällt (When love ends). He was awarded the Medal of German Cancer Aid for Niemand soll der Nächste sein! (Nobody should be the next). In 1979, Spahn received the German Industrial Film Prize for the TV series Computer können nicht vergessen! (Computers can't forget) in connection with the Federal Data Protection Act. Under the title and with the TV production Don't be afraid to fly, Spahn and Rainer Pieritz founded seminars to allay the fear of flying in Germany. As author and director, Spahn produced two impressive portraits on Carl Djerassi, the chemist, author, art collector and Father of the pill, and Otto Erich Deutsch, the Schubert researcher (Deutsch Catalog).

== Awards ==
Claus Spahn was awarded the Ehrenteller des Deutschen Schachbundes (Commemorative Plate of the German Chess Federation) in 1992. He received the Deutscher Schachpreis (German Chess Award) of the German Chess Federation on two occasions (1983/2001) for his commitment to the sport of chess, as well as the Medal of the European Chess Union (ECU) and the Gold Merit Award of the World Chess Federation FIDE in 2002.

In 2001, he was awarded the Cross of the Order of Merit of the Federal Republic of Germany by Federal President Johannes Rau for his many years of outstanding journalistic and editorial work.
