= Hundt =

Hundt is a surname. Notable people with the surname include:

- Gustav Hundt (1894–1945), German general in the Wehrmacht during World War II
- Magnus Hundt (1449–1519), German physician and theologian
- Neil Hundt, American bass guitarist
- Reed Hundt (born 1948), American attorney

== See also ==
- Hund (disambiguation)
