= Chess of the Grandmasters =

German TV programme

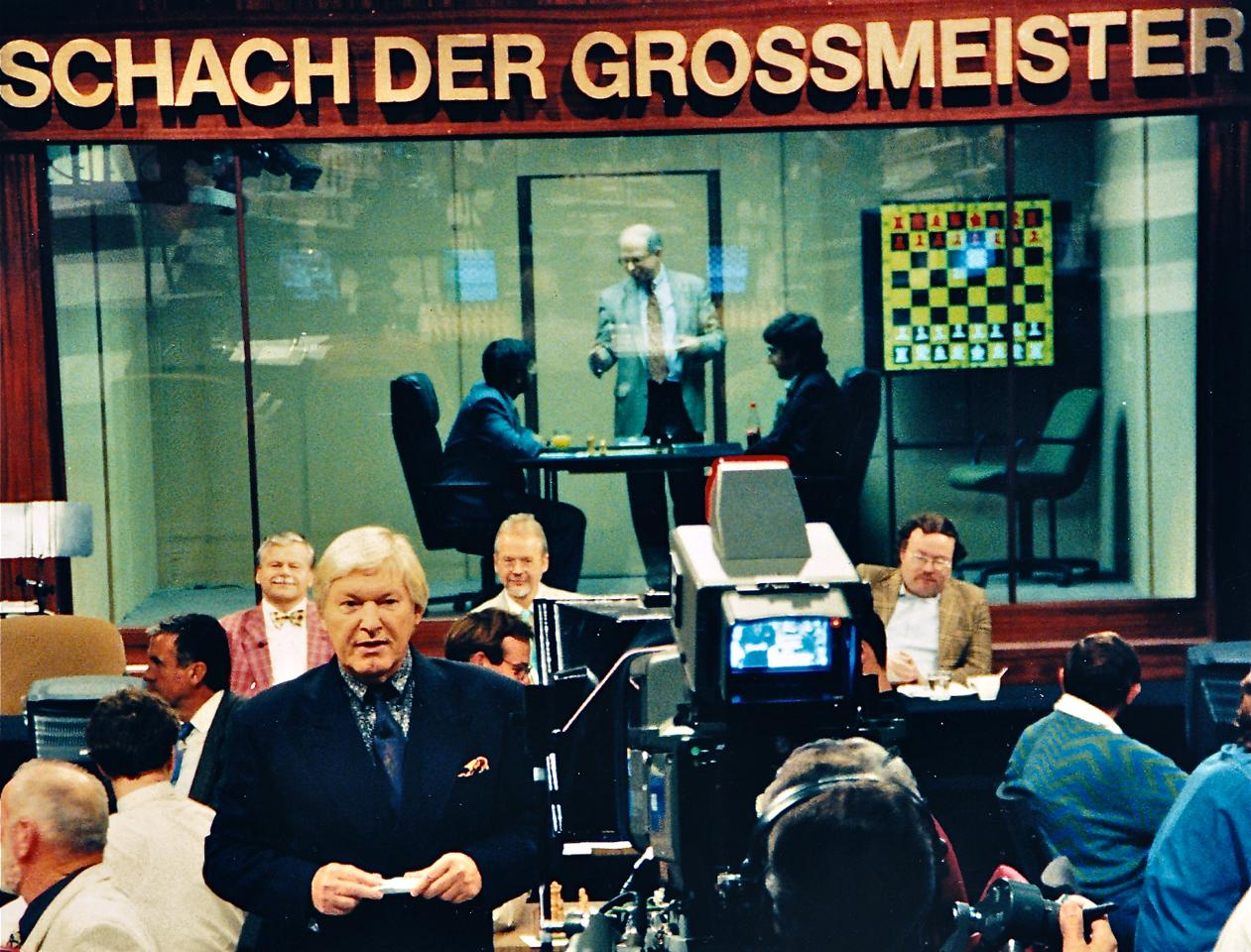
Claus Spahn presenting the Chess of the Grandmasters TV programme with Viswanathan Anand and Vladimir Kramnik in 1996. Photo: WDR.

Chess of the Grandmasters (original title: Schach der Großmeister) is a former German TV programme. The programme was devised, supervised and presented by Claus Spahn.

== History ==
Between 1983 and 2005, the programme was broadcast once a year by Germany's Westdeutscher Rundfunk (WDR) broadcasting corporation. The concept of the programme was that two Grandmasters played a game of chess against each other that was commentated and analysed by two Grandmasters, Helmut Pfleger and Vlastimil Hort, and later also analysed by the chess program Fritz. The winner received the WDR TV Chess Award and had the opportunity to defend the title against a new challenger in the following year.

The invited players included Garry Kasparov, Vladimir Kramnik, Viswanathan Anand, Peter Leko, Jan Timman and lot more. The first game was played in 1983 by Chess Worldchampion Anatoly Karpov and the strongest German player at that time, Robert Hübner. In the final broadcast in 2005, the two commentators Pfleger and Hort themselves played against each other.

In 1995, Kasparov won a two-game match (1½-½) against the Chess Genius 3 computer program. This contest attracted great attention in the media, because Kasparov had shortly before lost against this program in a Fast chess tournament in London.

== Examples of games ==
Position: a8 black rook, c8 black bishop, e8 black rook, f8 black queen, g8 black king, a7 black pawn, b7 black pawn, d7 black knight, g7 black pawn, h7 black pawn, c6 black pawn, d6 black bishop, e5 black pawn, f5 black pawn, g5 white bishop, c4 white pawn, d4 white pawn, e4 white queen, d3 white bishop, f3 white knight, a2 white pawn, b2 white pawn, f2 white pawn, g2 white pawn, h2 white pawn, a1 white rook, d1 white rook, g1 white king

Hübner - Kasparow 1992, position after 14. ... f7-f5. Hübner played 15. Qe4xf5, after 15. ... Nd7-f6 there was no square for the attacked queen and Hübner resigned.

The most remarkable games in the series included the victory of Judit Polgár, aged just 14 at the time, against the experienced German Grandmaster Rainer Knaak in 1990, as well as the defeat of Hübner against Kasparov in just 15 moves in 1992.

Judit Polgár – Rainer Knaak, Chess of the Grandmasters 1990

1.e4 e6 2.d4 d5 3.Nc3 Bb4 4.e5 c5 5.a3 Bxc3+ 6.bxc3 Ne7 (the Winawer Variation of the French Defence, ECO code C18) 7.Qg4 Qc7 8.Bd3 cxd4 9.Ne2 Qxe5 10.Bf4 Qf6 11.Bg5 Qe5 12.cxd4 h5 13.Qh4 Qc7 14.Bf4 Qa5+ 15.Bd2 Qd8 16.g4 e5 17.dxe5 Bxg4 18.Rg1 Qd7 19.f3 Be6 20.Nd4 Nbc6 21.Nxc6 Nxc6 22.Rxg7 Qc7 23.f4 Nxe5 24.fxe5 Qxe5+ 25.Kf2 Qxg7 26.Rg1 Qb2 27.Bb4 f6 28.Re1 O-O-O 29.Rxe6 Kb8 30.Qxf6 Qa2 31.Qd4 Rc8 32.Bd2 Ka8 33.Be3 Rxc2+ 34.Bxc2 Qxc2+ 35.Ke1 Qb1+ 36.Kd2 Qa2+ 37.Kd1 Qb1+ 38.Ke2 Qc2+ 39.Bd2 Rf8 40.Qxd5 1-0

== Games and results ==
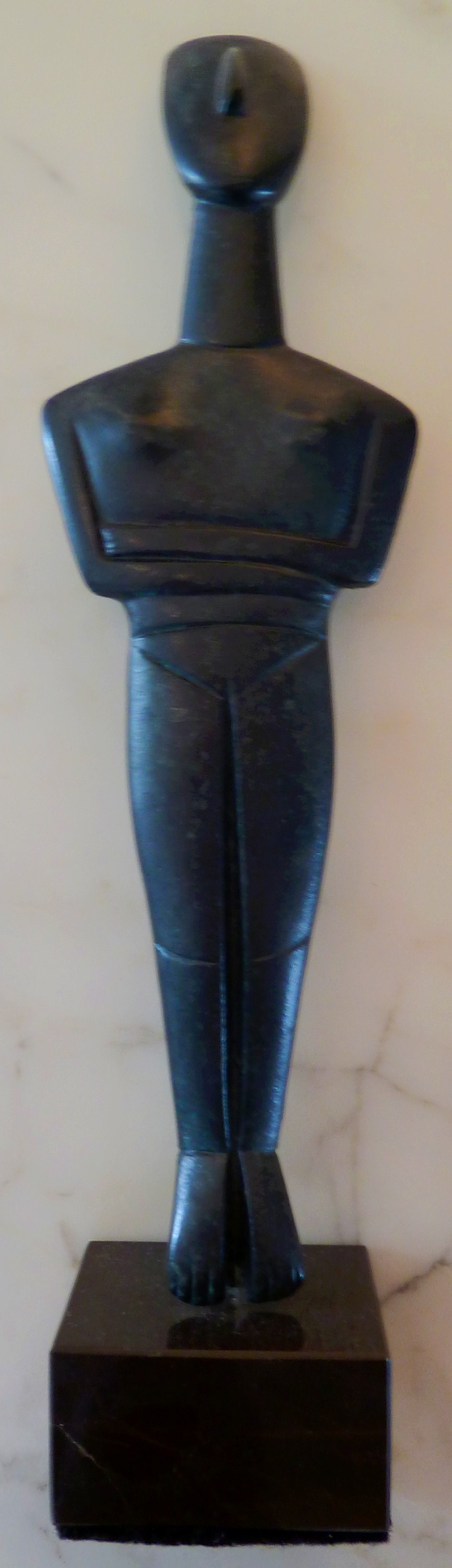
The TV Chess Award

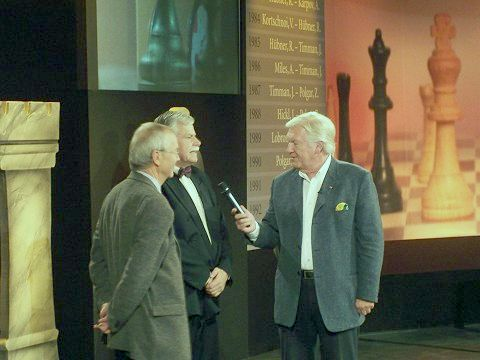
Pfleger, Hort and Spahn at Cologne 2005

The tables below list games than can be played (Java Script).

TV Chess Award:

Year	White	Black	Result	Game
1983	Robert Hübner	Anatoly Karpov	Remis	(1983)
1984	Viktor Korchnoi	Robert Hübner	0-1	(1984)
1985	Robert Hübner	Jan Timman	0-1	(1985)
1986	Tony Miles	Jan Timman	0-1	(1986)
1987	Jan Timman	Susan Polgar	Remis	(1987)
1988	Jörg Hickl	Susan Polgar	Remis	(1988)
1989	Eric Lobron	Judit Polgár	Remis	(1989)
1990	Judit Polgár	Rainer Knaak	1-0	(1990)
1991	Judit Polgár	Gerald Hertneck	0-1	(1991)
1992	Matthias Wahls	Gerald Hertneck	1-0	(1992)
1993	Matthias Wahls	Christopher Lutz	Remis	(1993)
1994	Christopher Lutz	Jeroen Piket	0-1	(1994)
1995	Jeroen Piket	Viswanathan Anand	0-1	(1995)
1996	Viswanathan Anand	Vladimir Kramnik	Remis	(1996)
1997	Vladimir Kramnik	Judit Polgár	1-0	(1997)
1998	Vladimir Kramnik	Michael Adams	1-0	(1998)
1999	Artur Yusupov	Jörg Hickl	1-0	(1999)
2000	Vladimir Kramnik	Péter Lékó	1-0	(2000)
2001	Péter Lékó	Viswanathan Anand	Remis	(2001)
2002	Anatoly Karpov	Robert Hübner	Remis, Remis, 0-1 (Fast chess)	(2002)
2003	Jan Timman	Arkadij Naiditsch	0-1	(2003)
2004	Arkadij Naiditsch	Rustam Kasimdzhanov	1-0	(2004)
2005	Helmut Pfleger	Vlastimil Hort	Remis	(2005)

Other broadcasts:

Year	White	Black	Result	Remarks
1992	Garry Kasparov	Robert Hübner	Draw	
1992	Robert Hübner	Garry Kasparov	0-1	
1992	Robert Hübner	Garry Kasparov	0-1	Fast chess
1992	Garry Kasparov	Robert Hübner	0-1	Fast chess
1995	Garry Kasparov	Chess Genius 3	1-0	Computer
1995	Chess Genius 3	Garry Kasparov	Remis	Computer

== References / Games ==
- Die 25 Partien des Fernsehschachpreises und die 6 Partien der weiteren Sendungen des WDR by Gerhard Hund (in German)
