= Hund's cases =

In rotational-vibrational and electronic spectroscopy of diatomic molecules, Hund's coupling cases are idealized descriptions of rotational states in which specific terms in the molecular Hamiltonian and involving couplings between angular momenta are assumed to dominate over all other terms. There are five cases, proposed by Friedrich Hund in 1926-27 and traditionally denoted by the letters (a) through (e). Most diatomic molecules are somewhere between the idealized cases (a) and (b).

== Angular momenta ==
To describe the Hund's coupling cases, we use the following angular momenta (where boldface letters indicate vector quantities):

- $\mathbf L$, the electronic orbital angular momentum
- $\mathbf S$, the electronic spin angular momentum
- $\mathbf J_a=\mathbf L+\mathbf S$, the total electronic angular momentum
- $\mathbf R$, the rotational angular momentum of the nuclei
- $\mathbf J=\mathbf R + \mathbf J_a$, the total angular momentum of the system (exclusive of nuclear spin)
- $\mathbf N=\mathbf R+\mathbf L= \mathbf J-\mathbf S$, the total angular momentum exclusive of electron (and nuclear) spin

These vector quantities depend on corresponding quantum numbers whose values are shown in molecular term symbols used to identify the states. For example, the term symbol ^{2}Π_{3/2} denotes a state with S = 1/2, Λ = 1 and J = 3/2.

== Choosing the applicable Hund's case ==
Hund's coupling cases are idealizations. The appropriate case for a given situation can be found by comparing three strengths: the electrostatic coupling of $\mathbf L$ to the internuclear axis, the spin-orbit coupling, and the rotational coupling of $\mathbf L$ and $\mathbf S$ to the total angular momentum $\mathbf J$.

For ^{1}Σ states the orbital and spin angular momenta are zero and the total angular momentum is just the nuclear rotational angular momentum. For other states, Hund proposed five possible idealized modes of coupling.

Hund's case	Electrostatic	Spin-orbit	Rotational
(a)	strong	intermediate	weak
(b)	strong	weak	intermediate
(c)	intermediate	strong	weak
(d)	intermediate	weak	strong
(e)	weak	intermediate	strong
(e)	weak	strong	intermediate

The last two rows are degenerate because they have the same good quantum numbers.

In practice there are also many molecular states which are intermediate between the above limiting cases.

== Case (a) ==
The most common case is case (a) in which $\mathbf L$ is electrostatically coupled to the internuclear axis, and $\mathbf S$ is coupled to $\mathbf L$ by spin-orbit coupling. Then both $\mathbf L$ and $\mathbf S$ have well-defined axial components, $\Lambda$ and $\Sigma$ respectively. As they are written with the same Greek symbol, the spin component $\Sigma$ should not be confused with $\Sigma$ states, which are states with orbital angular component $\Lambda$ equal to zero. $\boldsymbol\Omega$ defines a vector of magnitude $\Omega=\Lambda+\Sigma$ pointing along the internuclear axis. Combined with the rotational angular momentum of the nuclei $\mathbf R$, we have $\mathbf J=\boldsymbol\Omega+\mathbf R$. In this case, the precession of $\mathbf L$ and $\mathbf S$ around the nuclear axis is assumed to be much faster than the nutation of $\boldsymbol\Omega$ and $\mathbf R$ around $\mathbf J$.

The good quantum numbers in case (a) are $\Lambda$, $S$, $\Sigma$, $J$ and $\Omega$. However $L$ is not a good quantum number because the vector $\mathbf L$ is strongly coupled to the electrostatic field and therefore precesses rapidly around the internuclear axis with an undefined magnitude. We express the rotational energy operator as $H_{rot}=B\mathbf R^2=B(\mathbf J-\mathbf L-\mathbf S)^2$, where $B$ is a rotational constant. There are, ideally, $2S+1$ fine-structure states, each with rotational levels having relative energies $BJ(J+1)$ starting with $J=\Omega$. For example, a ^{2}Π state has a ^{2}Π_{1/2} term (or fine structure state) with rotational levels $\mathbf J$ = 1/2, 3/2, 5/2, 7/2, ... and a ^{2}Π_{3/2} term with levels $\mathbf J$ = 3/2, 5/2, 7/2, 9/2.... Case (a) requires $\Lambda$ > 0 and so does not apply to any Σ states, and also $S$ > 0 so that it does not apply to any singlet states.

The selection rules for allowed spectroscopic transitions depend on which quantum numbers are good. For Hund's case (a), the allowed transitions must have $\Delta\Lambda = 0, \pm1$ and $\Delta S = 0$ and $\Delta \Sigma = 0$ and $\Delta\Omega = 0, \pm1$ and $\Delta J = 0, \pm1$. In addition, symmetrical diatomic molecules have even (g) or odd (u) parity and obey the Laporte rule that only transitions between states of opposite parity are allowed.

== Case (b) ==
In case (b), the spin-orbit coupling is weak or non-existent (in the case $\Lambda=0$). In this case, we take $\mathbf N=\boldsymbol\Lambda+\mathbf R$ and $\mathbf J=\mathbf N+\mathbf S$ and assume $\mathbf L$ precesses quickly around the internuclear axis.

The good quantum numbers in case (b) are $\Lambda$, $N$, $S$, and $J$. We express the rotational energy operator as $H_{rot}=B\mathbf R^2=B(\mathbf N-\mathbf L)^2$, where $B$ is a rotational constant. The rotational levels therefore have relative energies $BN(N+1)$ starting with $N=\Lambda$. For example, a ^{2}Σ state has rotational levels $N$ = 0, 1, 2, 3, 4, ..., and each level is divided by spin-rotation coupling into two levels $J$ = $N$ ± 1/2 (except for $N$ = 0 which corresponds only to $J$ = 1/2 because $J$ cannot be negative).

Another example is the ^{3}Σ ground state of dioxygen, which has two unpaired electrons with parallel spins. The coupling type is Hund's case b), and each rotational level N is divided into three levels $J$ = $N-1$, $N$, $N+1$.

For case b) the selection rules for quantum numbers $\Lambda$, $S$, $\Sigma$ and $\Omega$ and for parity are the same as for case a). However for the rotational levels, the rule for quantum number $J$ does not apply and is replaced by the rule $\Delta N = 0, \pm1$.

== Case (c) ==
In case (c), the spin-orbit coupling is stronger than the coupling to the internuclear axis, and $\Lambda$ and $\Sigma$ from case (a) cannot be defined. Instead $\mathbf L$ and $\mathbf S$ combine to form $\mathbf J_a$, which has a projection along the internuclear axis of magnitude $\Omega$. Then $\mathbf J=\boldsymbol\Omega+\mathbf R$, as in case (a).

The good quantum numbers in case (c) are $J_a$, $J$, and $\Omega$. Since $\Lambda$ is undefined for this case, the states cannot be described as $\Sigma$, $\Pi$ or $\Delta$. An example of Hund's case (c) is the lowest ^{3}Π_{u} state of diiodine (I_{2}), which approximates more closely to case (c) than to case (a).

The selection rules for $S$, $\Omega$ and parity are valid as for cases (a) and (b), but there are no rules for $\Lambda$ and $\Sigma$ since these are not good quantum numbers for case (c).

== Case (d) ==
In case (d), the rotational coupling between $\mathbf L$ and $\mathbf R$ is much stronger than the electrostatic coupling of $\mathbf L$ to the internuclear axis. Thus we form $\mathbf N$ by coupling $\mathbf L$ and $\mathbf R$ and the form $\mathbf J$ by coupling $\mathbf N$ and $\mathbf S$.

The good quantum numbers in case (d) are $L$, $R$, $N$, $S$, and $J$. Because $R$ is a good quantum number, the rotational energy is simply $H_{rot}=B\mathbf R^2=BR(R+1)$.

== Case (e) ==
In case (e), we first form $\mathbf J_a$ and then form $\mathbf J$ by coupling $\mathbf J_a$ and $\mathbf R$. This case is rare but has been observed. Rydberg states which converge to ionic states with spin–orbit coupling (such as ^{2}Π) are best described as case (e).

The good quantum numbers in case (e) are $J_a$, $R$, and $J$. Because $R$ is once again a good quantum number, the rotational energy is $H_{rot}=B\mathbf R^2=BR(R+1)$.
