= Gerhard Hund =

German mathematician, computer scientist and chess player (1932–2024)

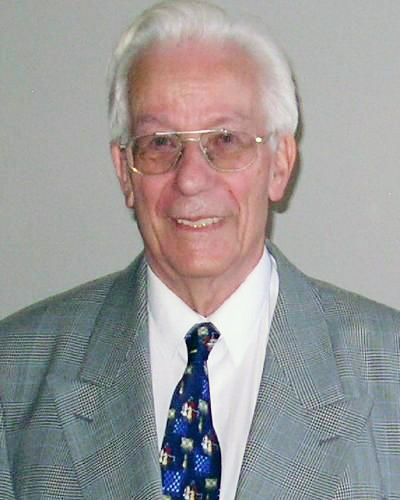
- Hund in 2010
- Born: Germany
- Scientific career
- Fields: Computer science, Mathematician

Gerhard Friedrich Hund (4 February 1932 – 21 June 2024) was a German chess player, mathematician and computer scientist.

== Biography ==
Gerhard Hund was the oldest son of physicist Friedrich Hund (1896–1997) and mathematician Ingeborg Seynsche (1905–1994). He studied at the Friedrich Schiller University in Jena (1950–1951) and at the Goethe University Frankfurt (1951–1955). After graduation, he was collaborator of Alwin Walther at the Institute of Applied Mathematics of the Technische Hochschule Darmstadt.

From 1961 to 1995 he was in middle management of Bayer in Leverkusen, from 1974 as procurator.

Hund died on 21 June 2024, at the age of 92.

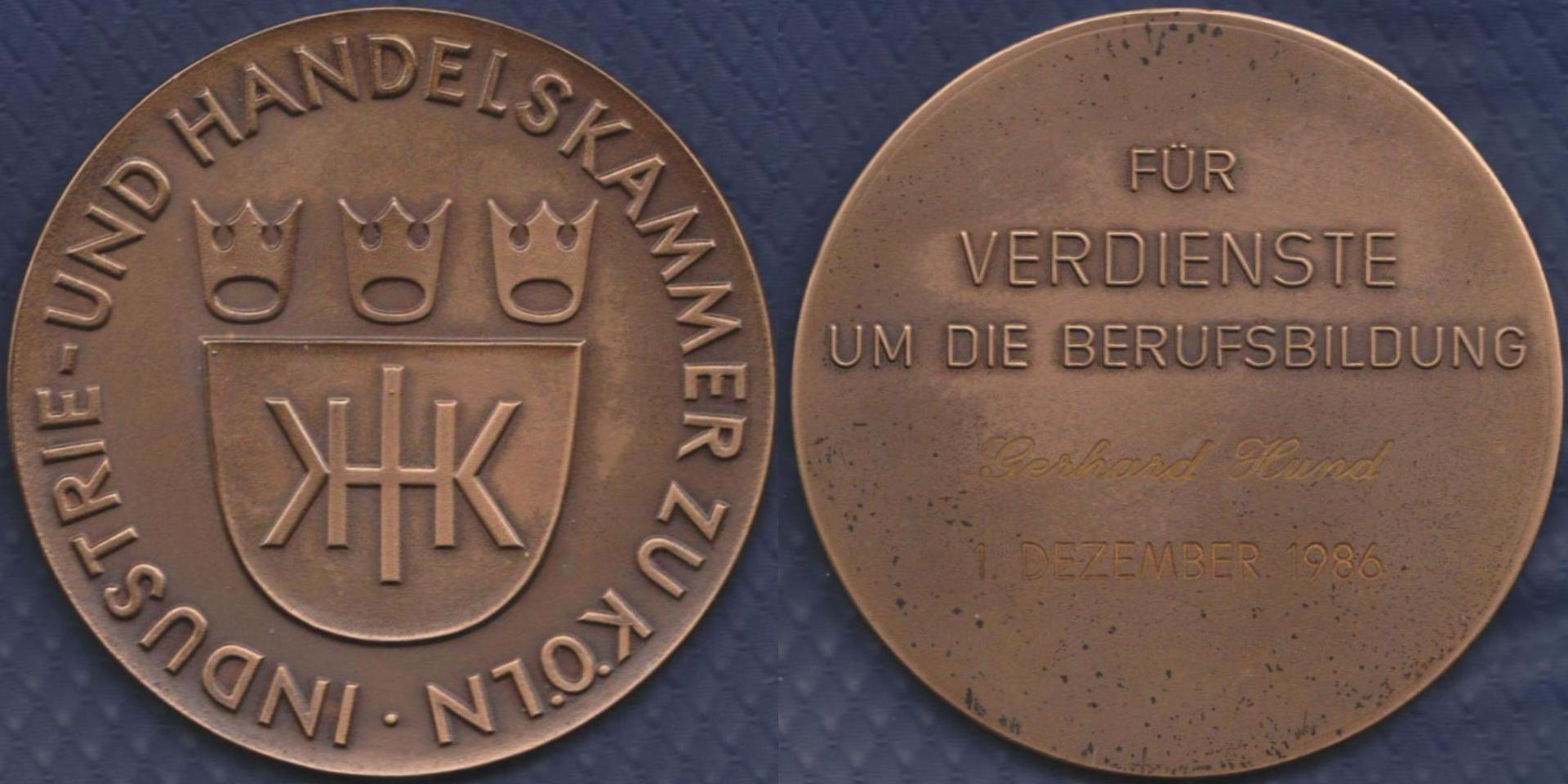
Medal of the Chamber of Commerce of Cologne (1986)

== Family ==
Father: Friedrich Hund (4 February 1896 – 31 March 1997) was a German physicist.
Mother: Martha Mechthild Ingeborg Seynsche (21 October 1905 – 27 June 1994), was a German mathematician.
Wife: Juliane Hund (née Meyer, 23 September 1928 – 9 December 1999), was a German chess player.
Children:

- Susanne Hund (born 1958)
- Barbara Hund (born 10 October 1959), she is a Swiss chess player and Woman Grandmaster.
- Isabel Hund (born 14 June 1962), she is a German chess player.
- Dorothee Hund (born 1966)

== Bibliography ==
- Standards for assessing the performance of electronic computing machine In. Economic management. Releases for personal information Vol 4, June 1958 ISSN 0508-8674., pp. 3–7 and 3–10 August p.
- Structure recognition and machine learning. Electronic computing systems, Issue 3, September 1959, pp. 111 Journal of Technology and application of message processing in science, business and management. R. Oldenbourg in Munich and Vienna, 1959.
- With H. Schappert: Programming for the IBM 650, lecture and practical 1959 Institute of Applied Mathematics, Technical University of Darmstadt, summer semester, 1959..
- Book reviews. E.g. In: VDI magazine Vol 101, No. 27, 1959, ISSN 0372-543X, p 1297th.
- With Wolfgang Möhlen: Report on the British computer systems In: leaves the German Society for Insurance Mathematics Vol 4, H. No. 4, April 1960 ISSN 0012-0200, pp. 454–461.
- With Günther Kern, Egon Rissmann: Gynecological cancer early diagnosis using cytology In:' Archives of Gynecology Vol 199, No. 5, 1964, ISSN 0932-0067, pp. 502–525, DOI doi:10.1007/BF00669777.
- With Günther Kern, Egon Rissmann: The performance of colposcopy early diagnosis of Collumcarcinoms In:' Archives of Gynecology Vol 199, No. 5, 1964, pp. 526–539, doi:10.1007/BF00669778.
- With H. Fink: Probit analysis using program-controlled computer systems In drug research Vol 15, 1965, ISSN 0004-4172, pp. 624–630.
- With H. Fink and D. Meysing: Comparison of biological effects by programmed probit In Methods of information in medicine Vol 5, No. 1, ISSN 0026-1270, pp. 19–25.
- FORTRAN Dictionary. In Leaves the German Society for Insurance Mathematics Vol 8, No. 3, October 1967, pp. 499–520.
- With W. Barthel and M. Wolf-Litt: Data processing businessman. Sheets for Professional Studies, Volume 1, Published by the Federal Employment Agency, Nuremberg, in cooperation with the German trade union federation, Düsseldorf. 1–IX A 303 Bertelsmann Verlag Bielefeld 1 Edition, 1973, No. 12.90.252.164 E, 15 pages.
- With Th Dimmling: Comparison of two ampicillin preparations juice In: Medicine Vol 69, April 1974 ISSN 0025-8458, pp. 642–645, PMID. 4,837,276th

== See also ==
- Dortmund Sparkassen Chess Meeting
- Chess of the Grandmasters
