= Juliane Hund =

German chess player (1928–1999)

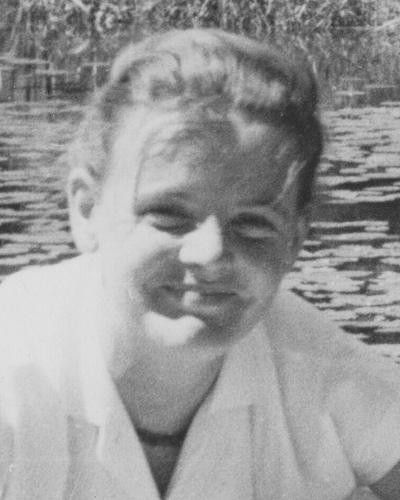
- Hund in 1957

Personal information
- Born: 23 September 1928 Darmstadt, Germany
- Died: 9 December 1999 (aged 71) Leverkusen, Germany

Chess career
- Country: Germany
- Title: International Correspondence Chess Master (1980)
- ICCF rating: 2250 (July 1999)
- ICCF peak rating: 2252 (July 1998)

Juliane Hund (née Meyer, 23 September 1928 – 9 December 1999) was a German chess player.

== Life ==
Juliane Meyer was born on 23 September 1928 in Darmstadt. She spent her childhood in Königsberg and before the end of World War II moved to Volkenroda in Thuringia to her grandmother. In 1946, she graduated from high school in Mühlhausen, Thuringia and then studied law in Marburg, Lausanne and Frankfurt. Meyer founded a student chess club at the University of Frankfurt, where she met her husband Gerhard Hund in 1955. They got married in 1957 and had four children. Her four daughters Susanne van Kempen (née Hund, * 1958), Barbara Hund (Woman Grandmaster 1982, * 1959), Isabel Hund (FIDE-Master, * 1962) and Dorothee Lampe (née Hund, * 1966) also became chess players. In 1961, the Hund family moved from Darmstadt to Leverkusen-Wiesdorf, where they lived until 1967 when they moved to Bergisch Neukirchen.

== Career ==
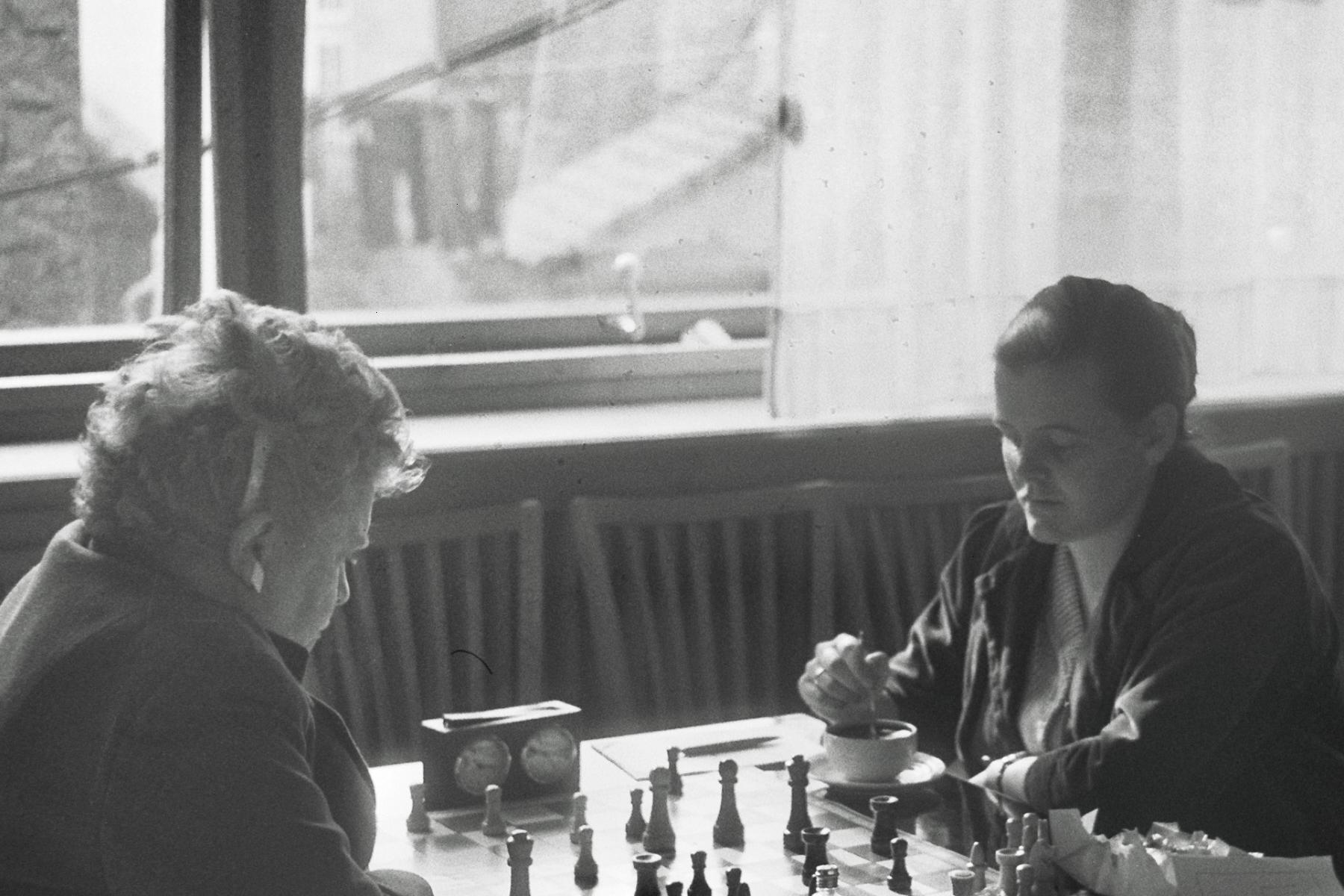
Juliane Hund at 1959 German women's championship in Dahn

In September 1959, Hund played at the German women's championship in Dahn where she took the second place. The same year she started playing correspondence chess. In 1975, Hund became a Lady International Correspondence Chess Master (LIM). In 1978, she won silver medal at the first women's Correspondence chess Olympiad and in 1980 she became an International Correspondence Chess Master (IM).

Hund participated in international chess tournaments in France, Switzerland, Spain, Greece, United Arab Emirates, the Philippines, Iceland and Finland. In 1989, Hund became the first German senior champion in chess and several times played at the Senior World Championships until 1997.

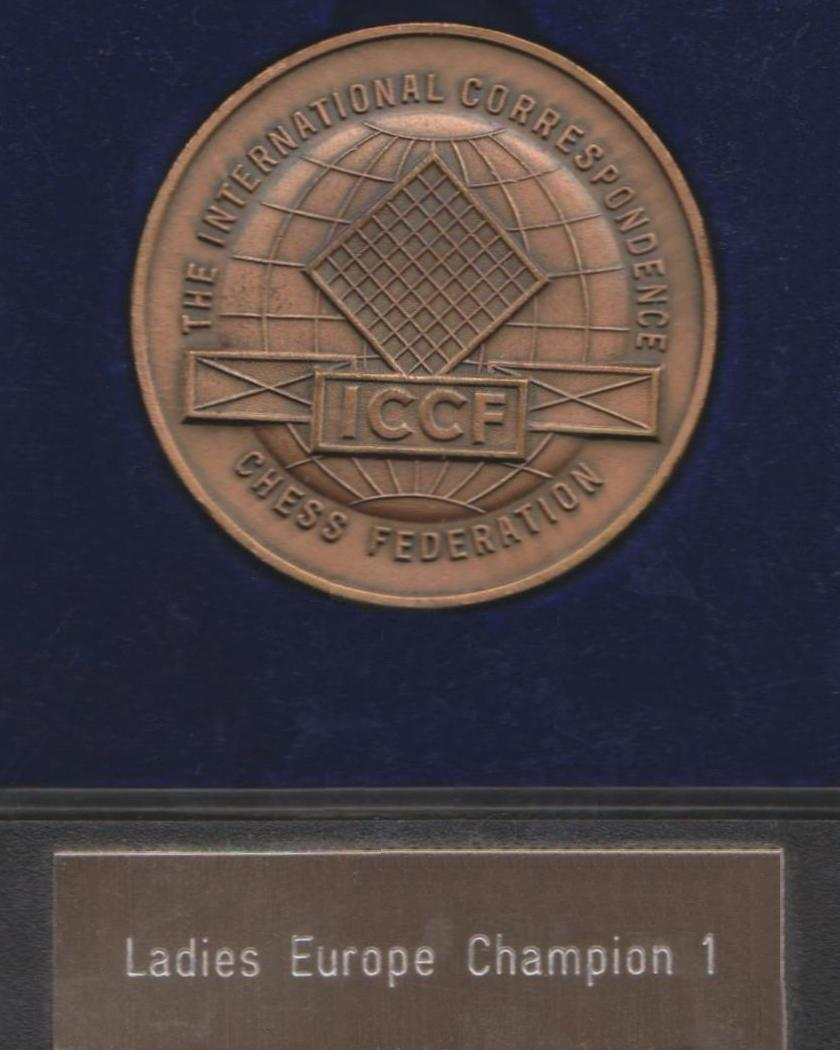
Medal of Juliane Hund

In 1995, Hund won the first place at European Ladies Championship. Having won the first European Fernschach Women's Championship, which lasted over 11 years, Hund was awarded the title of the “1st European Champion” at the ICCF Congress (World Chess Federation) in Riga in 1998. In 1999, Hund received the Golden Badge of Honor from the German Fernschachbund (BdF).

Juliane Hund died on 9 December 1999 in Leverkusen.
