= Isabel Hund =

German chess player (born 1962)

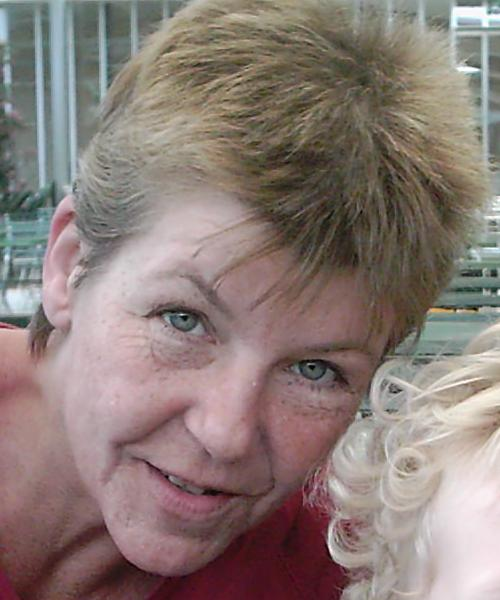
- Isabel Hund in 2008

Personal information
- Born: 14 June 1962 (age 64) Leverkusen, West Germany

Chess career
- Country: Germany
- Title: Woman FIDE Master (1990)
- Peak rating: 2140 (January 1994)

Isabel Hund (born 14 June 1962) is a German chess Chess Woman FIDE Master (WFM, 1990) who two-times won West Germany Women's Chess Championship (1980, 1989). Also she won Belgian Women's Chess Championship (1985).

== Private and work ==
Isabel Hund is the daughter of Juliane and Gerhard Hund, and granddaughter of physicist Friedrich Hund and mathematician Ingeborg Seynsche. She attended the Landrat-Lucas-Gymnasium in Opladen (Abitur 1981), studied Jurisprudence for a few semesters in Cologne, completed an apprenticeship as a social security clerk and works for the Techniker Krankenkasse. Isabel Hund lives in Nörvenich.

She belongs to an internationally known chess family, has three sisters who are all chess players. Barbara, who is Woman Grandmaster (WGM), is ahead of Isabel.

== Chess career ==
Isabel Hund was initially member in the chess clubs Schachfreunde 1959 Bergisch Neukirchen and SV Opladen 1922 e. V.. With the 8-man team of chess friends club Bergisch Neukirchen, she became youth team champion in 1977 in the Rhein-Wupper chess district. She plays for the chess club Kerpen 64 e. V. in the league of the Chess Association Mittelrhein. Hund has also played in the first Chess Women's Bundesliga, her clubs were from 1991 to 1996 the Krefelder Schachklub Turm 1851, in the 1996/97 and 1998/99 seasons the SV 1920 Hofheim, in the 2006/07 season the SV Wolfbusch and in the 2010/11 season the SV Mülheim-Nord.

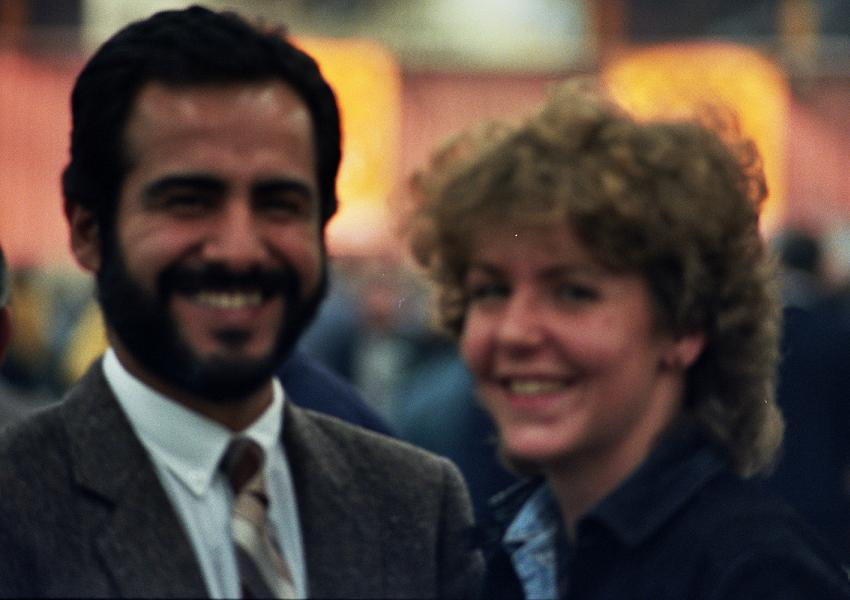
Miguel Quinteros and Isabel Hund, Chess Olympiad 1984

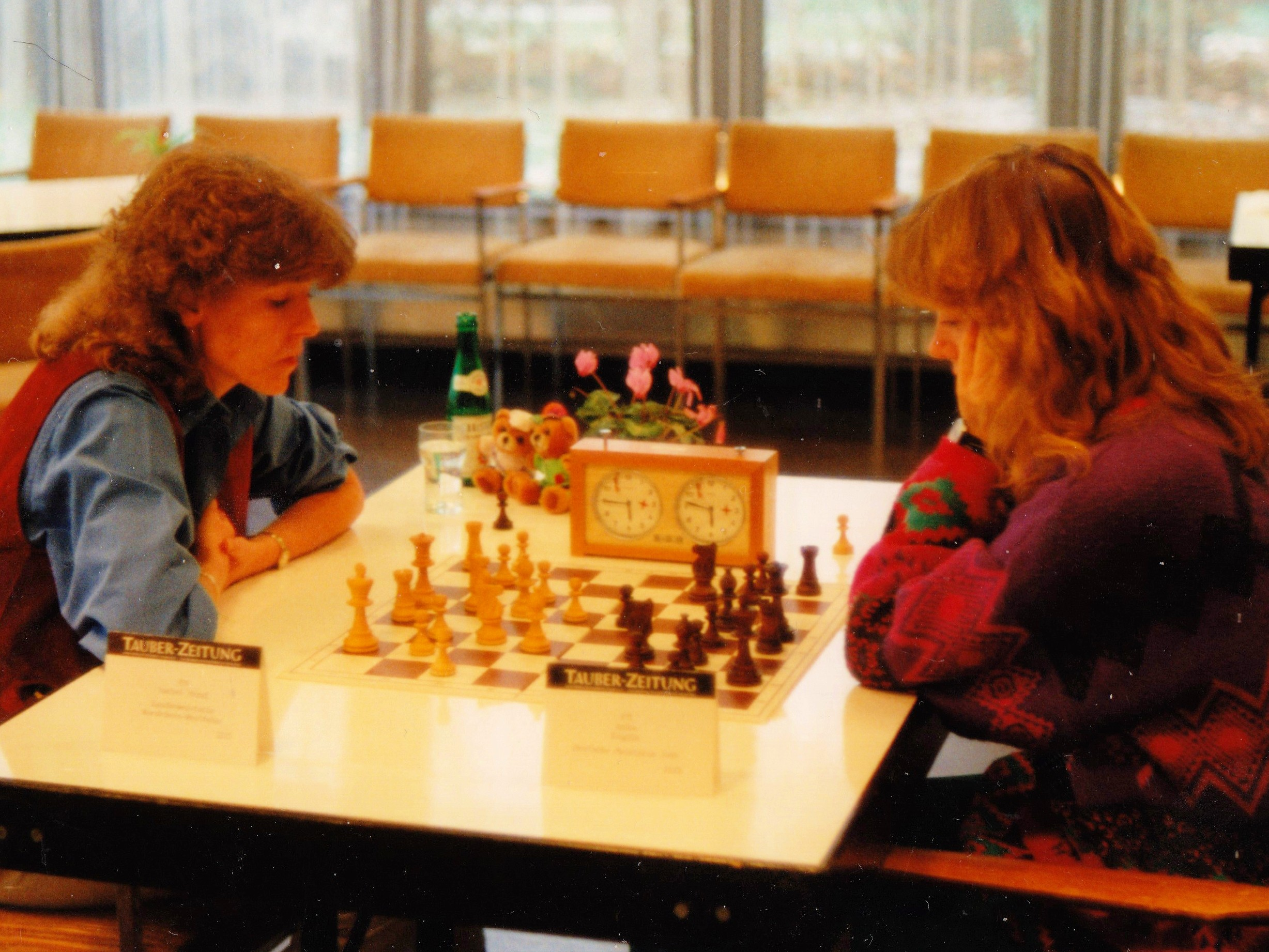
Isabel Hund and Anke Koglin, at the German Women's Chess Championship 1993 in Bad Mergentheim.

As a little girl interested in chess, Isabel Hund attended the 1970 Chess Olympiad in Siegen and in 1974 the 2nd International Chess Days in Dortmund and took part in the German Girls Team Championships in Meschede in 1975, 1976 and 1977. Isabel Hund was in 1977 and 1978 each second at the German Girls Championship, behind her sister Barbara. German champion the female youth she was in 1979 in Bechhofen and 1980 in Bitburg. The first four of the German Chess Championship in 1977 in Adelsheim went to a 4-man rapid tournament in Hamburg in the autumn. They (Barbara and Isabel Hund, as well as Karin Seiffert and Regina Berglitz) played under the name Hamkusmar and were able to beat the team of the German Chess Federation (Klaus Darga, Sergiu Samarian, Alfred Kinzel and Heinz Hohlfeld) place.

Isabel Hund played very often in the Germany Women's Chess Championship with, was in the top three more than 10 times. She gained her international experience at chess tournaments in Romania, Switzerland, France, Spain and at the Chess Olympiad 1980 in Valletta on Malta.

In 1980 and in 1989 she won West Germany Women's Chess Championships, in 1983 she won West Germany Women's Blitz Championship und in 1985 she won Belgian Women's Chess Championship in Gent. In 1985 she took part in the Women's World Chess Championship Zonal tournament in Bad Lauterberg. Because of her success, she received the Golden Badge of Honor from the Chess Association Mittelrhein.

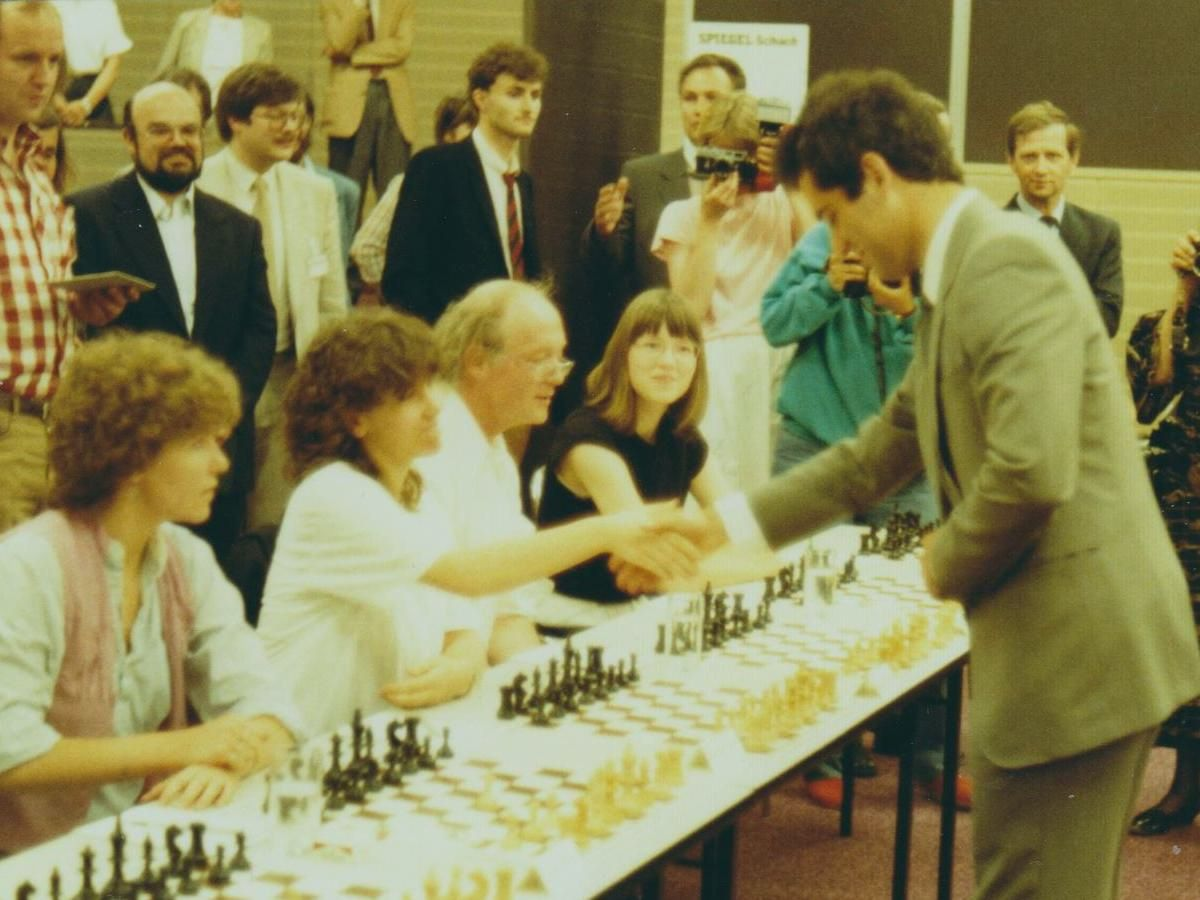
Isabel Hund (left) playing simultaneous game by Garry Kasparov in Hamburg in 1985

On June 5, 1985, Der Spiegel organized a simultaneous game of the world champion Garry Kasparov in Hamburg, in which, among others, Egon Bahr, Klaus von Dohnanyi, Roswin Finkenzeller, Johannes Gross, Felix Magath and Ulrich Wildgruber, as well as the four siblings Susanne, Barbara, Isabel and Dorothee Hund took part. When the BSG Textil Cottbus visited the Essener Schachgesellschaft 04 in 1990, Isabel Hund (West Germany chess women's champion 1989) won against Kerstin Kunze (East Germany chess women's champion 1989).

Isabel Hund won the finals of the eighth and ninth TeleChess Championship and became NRW champion in Mülheim an der Ruhr in 2004. With her team, she won the German women's chess state team championships in 1996, 1997, 2001, 2003, 2006, 2008 and 2009.
