= Barbara Hund =

Swiss chess player (born 1959)

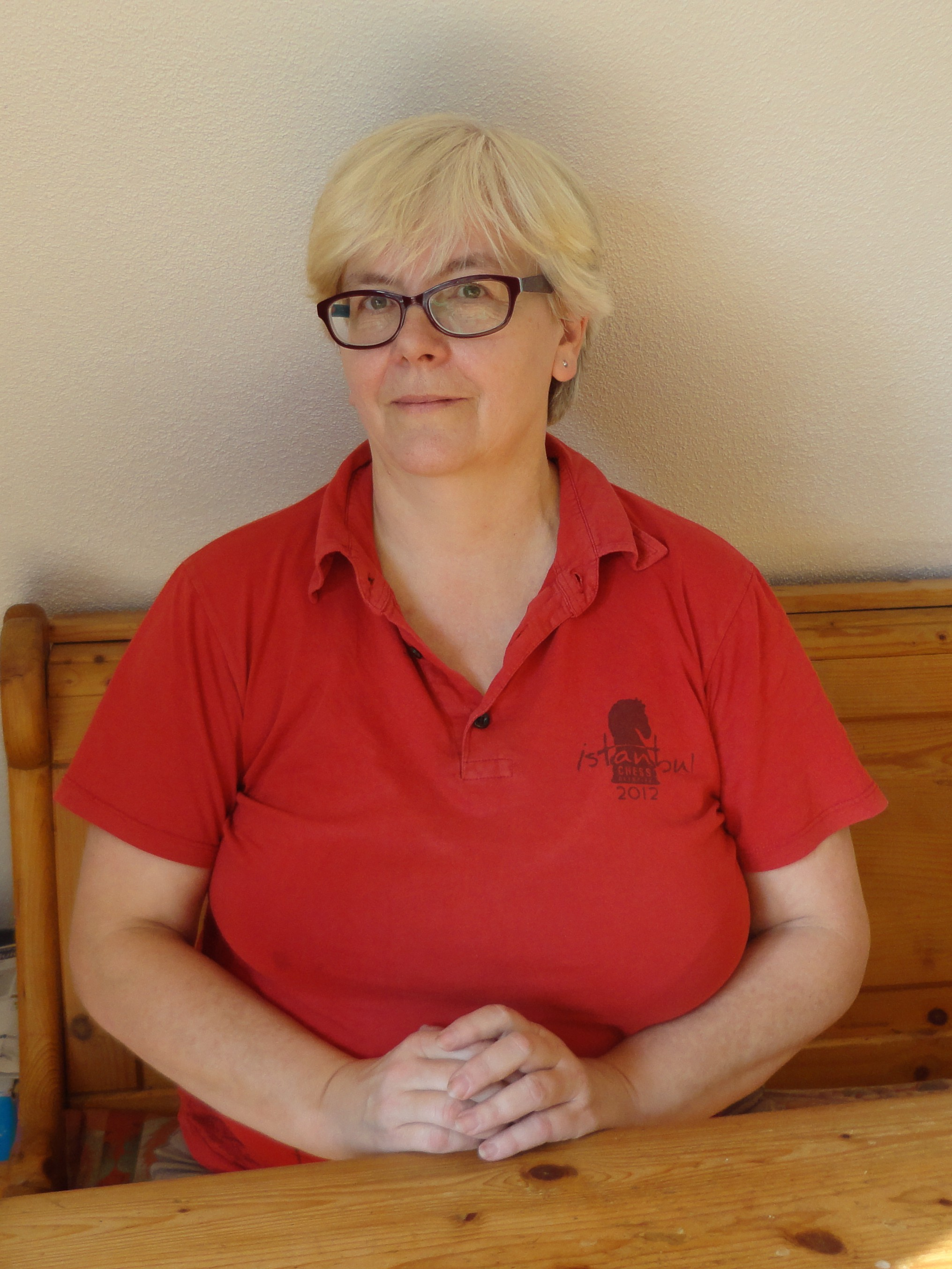
- Hund in 2015

Personal information
- Born: 10 October 1959 (age 66) Darmstadt, Germany

Chess career
- Country: Germany; Switzerland
- Title: Woman Grandmaster (1982)
- Peak rating: 2370 (January 1987)

Barbara Hund (born 10 October 1959 in Darmstadt, Germany) is a Swiss chess player who holds the FIDE title of Woman Grandmaster (WGM). She is the daughter of Juliane and Gerhard Hund and the granddaughter of physicist Friedrich Hund and mathematician Ingeborg Seynsche.

== Biography ==
After graduating from high school in 1978, she studied mathematics in Cologne and graduated in 1987 with a degree in mathematics. She moved to Freiburg im Breisgau, Germany and worked at an insurance company in Basel, Switzerland. In 1989 she married the editor of the Swiss chess magazine Die Schachwoche Peter Bolt (1949–2016), from whom she was later divorced. She has a daughter Sarah (born 1998) who also plays chess actively. After maternity leave, Barbara began working again in Switzerland. She has both German nationality and Swiss citizenship .

=== Chess career ===
In her youth Hund was one of Germany's greatest young talents in chess. Between 1975 and 1978, she was four times German youth champion four times and the 1978, 1982 and 1984 German women's champion. She achieved her first international success at the European Youth Championships in Kikinda (1978) and 1979 in Kula, both of which Nana Iosseliani won. In each case Hund was fourth. She won various international women's tournaments: 1977 in Biel, 1980 in Wijk aan Zee and 1982 in Belgrade. In 1979 she finished second at the women's zone tournament in Tel Aviv and qualified for the 1979 Interzonal tournament in Rio de Janeiro, Brazil where she finished 14th.

Hund has taken part in 15 women's Chess Olympiads. She played six times for the Federal Republic of Germany at the Chess Olympiads from 1978 to 1988 in Buenos Aires, Valletta, Lucerne, Thessaloniki, Dubai and Thessaloniki, with which she won the bronze medal at the 1978 Chess Olympiad in Buenos Aires won and finished second in the individual rankings on the third board.

At the 1980 Chess Olympiad in Valletta, Malta, she achieved the third-best individual result on board two and won the bronze medal. The German team achieved a draw against the Olympic champions Soviet Union at the 1984 Chess Olympiad in Thessaloniki.

She has represented Switzerland internationally since 1991, with whom she participated in the 1992 Women's Chess Olympiad in Manila, 1994 in Moscow, 2000 in Istanbul, 2002 in Bled, 2004 in Calvià, 2006 in Turin, 2008 in Dresden, 2012 in Istanbul and 2014 in Tromsø.

In Moscow 1994 she won the bronze medal for the third-best individual result on the second board. Hund also took part in four European Women's Team Championships between 1992 and 2007 with Switzerland. In 1993 she won the Swiss Women's Championship in Silvaplana.

In early 1983, at the time of her greatest successes, she was in the top ten in the women's Elo world rankings.

=== Personal life ===
Barbara Hund's parents were both chess players, Gerhard Hund (1932–2024) and Juliane Hund (1928–1999). It was an internationally known chess family. She has three sisters, all of whom are strong chess players. Isabel Hund (FIDE Women's Champion, 1962) is considered the second strongest player after Barbara. Barbara Hund's daughter, Sarah Hund, is also a strong chess player.

=== Selected championships ===
Hund won the Women's Swiss Chess Championship in 1993.

She played for the West German women's team which won the bronze medal at the 32nd Chess Olympiad.

She made it to the Interzonal stage in the Women's World Chess Championship in 1981 and 1984.
