= Voller Hund =

German card game suitable for children

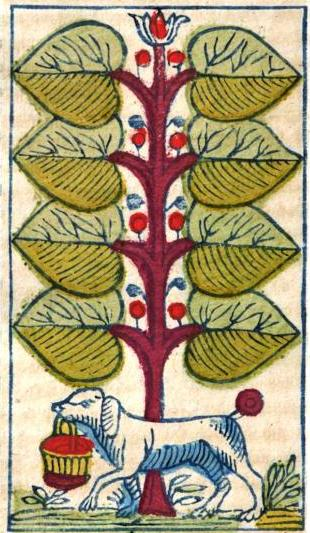
- The Dog: the 8 of Leaves from an 18th-century Schwerter pack
- Type: Shedding
- Players: 3-6
- Age range: 5+
- Deck: 32 French or German cards (Skat pack)
- Play: clockwise
- Playing time: 5-10 minutes
- Chance: Easy

Voller Hund ("full dog") or Hund, possibly known in Austria as Hundern or Hundspiel, is a German card game that is suitable for children. It is named after the Eight of Leaves, the Dog (der Hund), which used to depict a dog in old card packs. The equivalent card in a standard pack is the Eight of Spades.

== Rules ==
The following rules are based on Müller and Reichelt.

A 32-card French or German pack may be used with cards ranking from Ace (high) to Seven (low). If French cards are used, the Eight of Spades is the Dog. The aim is to avoid being the last player with any cards in one's hand. All the cards are dealt; it makes no difference if one or two players have an extra card. The player with the Dog plays it, face up, to the table and follows it with any card of his choice, such as a King. The player to the left must play another King (in this example) onto the pile, before laying a card of his choice on top. This continues unless a player is unable to match the last played card, in which case they must pick up the entire wastepile, except for the Dog, and add it to his hand. The last player with cards in his hand has lost.

== Variation ==
In Gööck, the first player leads with only one card: the Dog. The next player must therefore play an Eight, before playing a second card of any denomination on it. Play continues as before.

== Hund ==
In what appears to be a variant, Hund, the player who leads with the Dog places a second card of his choice on it before tuhe trn passes to the next player, who must then match the second card played in suit, not rank, with his first card, before playing a second card of his choice. Subsequent players must also match the suit and not the rank of the last card played. If a player cannot do this, he merely picks up the last card of the pile and adds it to his hand. The first player out, wins (as opposed to the last player out, loses). Players drop out as they win and are awarded points or payments according to the order in which they dropped out.

== Literature ==
- Dietze, Rudolf (1990). Das neue Spielbuch. 3rd edn. Tribüne, Berlin. ISBN 3-7303-0504-2
- Feder, Jan (1980). Die schönsten Kartenspiele: Über 100 Variationen mit dem Skatblatt. 2nd edn. Droemersche Verlagsanstalt Th. Kanur Nachf., Freising. ISBN 3-426-07628-4
- Geiser, Remigius (2004). "100 Kartenspiele des Landes Salzburg", in Talon, Issue 13.
- Gööck, Roland (1967). Freude am Kartenspiel, Bertelsmann, Gütersloh.
- Müller, Reiner F. (1994). Die bekanntesten Kartenspiele. Neff, Berlin. ISBN 3-8118-5856-4
- Reichelt, Hans (1987). Kartenspiele von Baccara bis Whist. Englisch, Wiesbaden. ISBN 3-88140-313-2
