= Friedrich Hund =

German physicist (1896–1997)

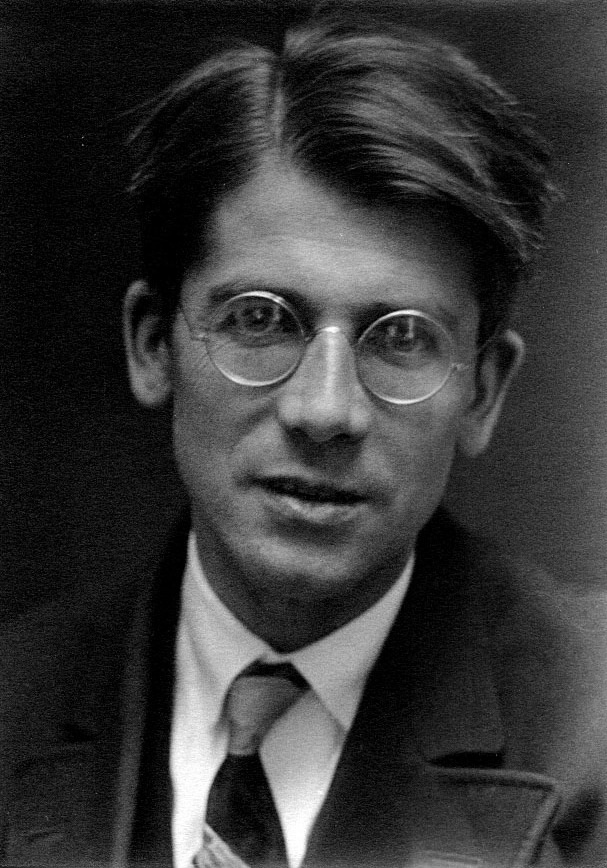
- Friedrich Hund, Göttingen, in the 1920s
- Born: 4 February 1896; Karlsruhe, Grand Duchy of Baden, German Empire
- Died: 31 March 1997 (aged 101); Göttingen, Lower Saxony, Germany
- Known for: Molecular orbital theory Quantum chemistry Quantum tunneling Hund's cases Hund's rule Hund's rules
- Awards: Max Planck Medal (1943); Otto Hahn Prize for Chemistry and Physics (1974)
- Scientific career
- Fields: Physics
- Workplaces: University of Göttingen; University of Rostock; Leipzig University; University of Jena; Frankfurt University
- Doctoral advisor: Max Born
- Doctoral students: Harry Lehmann; Carl Friedrich von Weizsäcker; Jürgen Schnakenberg; Edward Teller

Friedrich Hermann Hund (4 February 1896 – 31 March 1997) was a German physicist from Karlsruhe known for his work on atoms and molecules. He is known for the Hund's rules to predict the electron configuration of chemical elements. His work on Hund's cases and molecular orbital theory furthered the understanding of molecular structure.

== Scientific career ==
Hund worked with prestigious physicists, as Erwin Schrödinger, Paul Dirac, Werner Heisenberg, Max Born, and Walther Bothe. At that time, he was Born's assistant, working with quantum interpretation of band spectra of diatomic molecules.

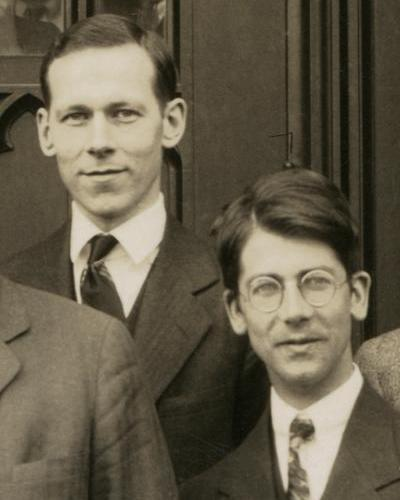
Robert Mulliken and Friedrich Hund (R), Chicago, 1929

After his studies of mathematics, physics, and geography in Marburg and Göttingen, he worked as a private lecturer of theoretical physics in the University of Göttingen (1925), professor in the University of Rostock (1927), Leipzig University (1929), University of Jena (1946), University Frankfurt (1951) and from 1957 again in Göttingen. Additionally, he stayed in Copenhagen (1926) with Niels Bohr and lectured on the atom at Harvard University (1928). He published more than 250 papers and essays in total. Hund made pivotal contributions to quantum theory - especially concerning the structure of the atom and of molecular spectra.

In fact, Robert S. Mulliken, who was awarded the 1966 Nobel Prize in Chemistry for molecular orbital theory, always proclaimed the great influence Hund's work had on his own and that he would have gladly shared the Nobel Prize with Hund. In recognition of the importance of Hund's contributions, molecular orbital theory is often referred to as the Hund–Mulliken MO theory. Hund's rule of maximum multiplicity is another eponym and, in 1926, Hund discovered the so-called tunnel effect or quantum tunnelling.

The Hund's cases, which are particular regimes in diatomic molecular angular momentum coupling, and Hund's rules, which govern atomic electron configurations, are important in spectroscopy and quantum chemistry. In chemistry, the first rule, Hund's rule of maximum multiplicity, is especially important and is often referred to as simply Hund's Rule.

In 1927 he introduced the apparent paradox, subsequently called "Hund's paradox", of why chiral molecules such as sugars and amino acids are found in left or right handed forms but not superpositions. Hund showed that the chiral states are unstable but that the relevant tunnelling rates for large molecules are too slow to observe. Subsequent development of quantum decoherence theory explains the stability of chirality in some smaller molecules as a manifestation of the quantum Zeno effect.

== Personal life ==
Hund married mathematician Ingeborg Seynsche (1905–1994) in Barmen on 17 March 1931. The family had six children: chess player and mathematician Gerhard Hund (1932–2024), Dietrich (1933–1939), Irmgard (b. 1934), Martin (1937–2018), Andreas (b. 1940) and Erwin (1941–2022). The chess woman grandmaster Barbara Hund (b. 1959) and chess player Isabel Hund (b. 1962) are his granddaughters.

== Honours ==
Hund was a member of the International Academy of Quantum Molecular Science. He was awarded the Max Planck Medal in 1943.

== Legacy ==
On the occasion of his 100th birthday, the book: Friedrich Hund: Geschichte der physikalischen Begriffe [History of Physical Concepts] (Heidelberg, Berlin, Oxford), Spektrum, Akademie Verlag 1996, ISBN 3-8274-0083-X was published. A review was also written by Werner Kutzelnigg. Friedrich Hund's work and interest in the history of science was also discussed intensely in an interview conducted by Klaus Hentschel and Renate Tobies.

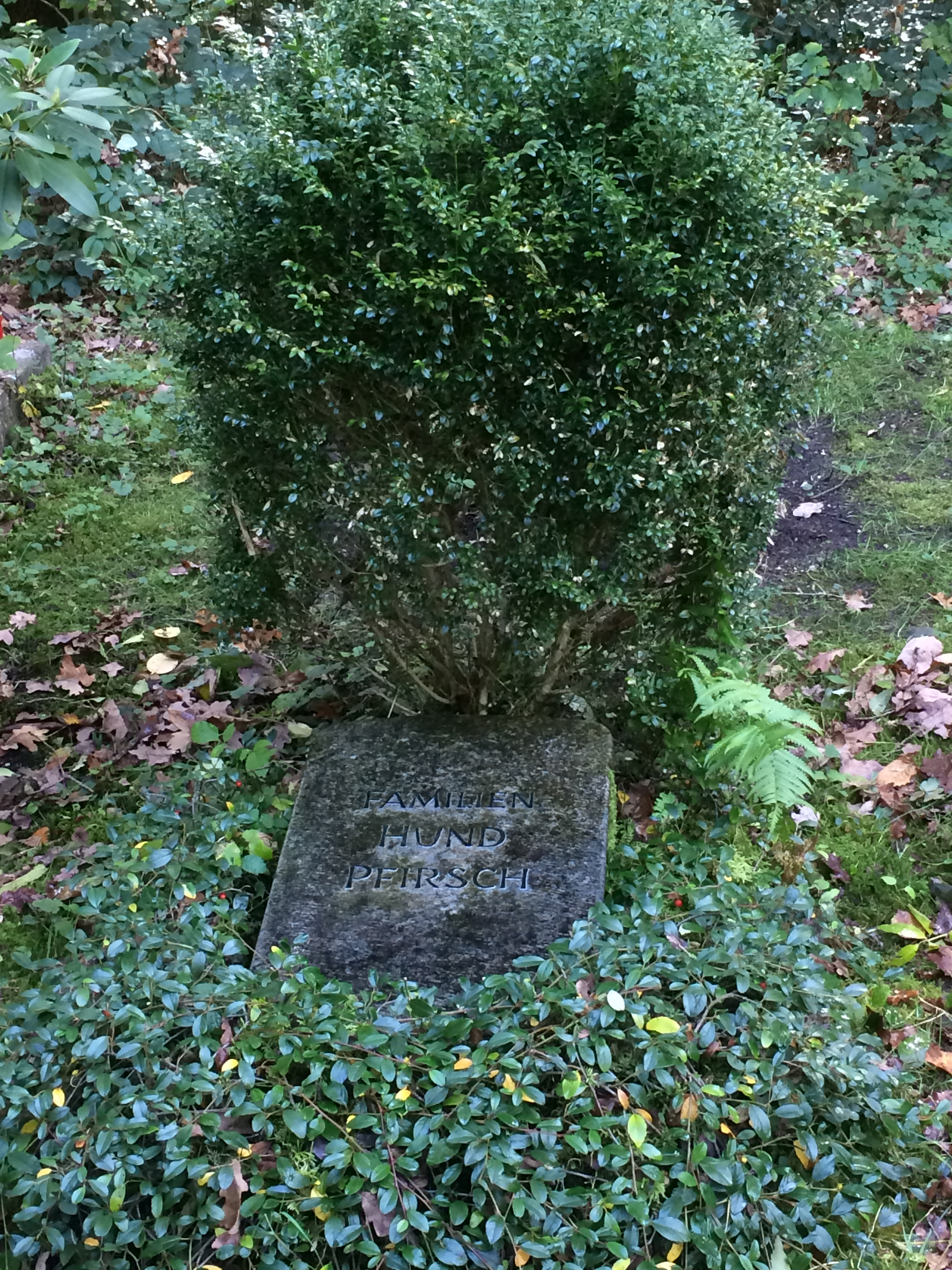
Hund-Pfirsch family grave in Munich Waldfriedhof, where Friedrich Hund is buried

In addition to the many honors bestowed upon him, Friedrich Hund became an honorary citizen of Jena/Saale, and a street in Jena was named after him. In June 2004, a part of a new building of the Physics Department in Göttingen was given the address Friedrich-Hund-Platz 1. The same name was chosen for the Institute for Theoretical Physics at the University of Göttingen.

== Publications ==
- Versuch einer Deutung der großen Durchlässigkeit einiger Edelgase für sehr langsame Elektronen, Dissertation, Universität Göttingen 1923
- Linienspektren und periodisches System der Elemente, Habil.Schrift, Universität Göttingen, Springer 1927
- Allgemeine Quantenmechanik des Atom- und Molekelbaues, in Handbuch der Physik, Band 24/1, 2nd edn., pp. 561–694 (1933)
- Materie als Feld, Berlin, Springer 1954
- Einführung in die Theoretische Physik, 5 vols. 1944-51, Meyers Kleine Handbücher, Leipzig, Bibliographisches Institut, 1945, 1950/51 (vol. 1: Mechanik, vol. 2: Theorie der Elektrizität und des Magnetismus, vol. 3: Optik, vol. 4: Theorie der Wärme, vol. 5: Atom- und Quantentheorie)
- Theoretische Physik, 3 vols., Stuttgart Teubner, zuerst 1956-57, vol. 1: Mechanik, 5th edn. 1962, vol. 2: Theorie der Elektrizität und des Lichts, Relativitätstheorie, 4th edn. 1963, vol. 3: Wärmelehre und Quantentheorie, 3rd edn. 1966
- Theorie des Aufbaues der Materie, Stuttgart, Teubner 1961
- Grundbegriffe der Physik, Mannheim, Bibliographisches Institut 1969, 2nd edn. 1979
- Geschichte der Quantentheorie, 1967, 2nd edn., Mannheim, Bibliographisches Institut 1975, 3rd edn. 1984; Eng. trans. 1974
- Quantenmechanik der Atome, in Handbuch der Physik/Encyclopedia of Physics, Band XXXVI, Berlin, Springer 1956
- Die Geschichte der Göttinger Physik, Vandenhoeck und Ruprecht 1987 (Göttinger Universitätsreden)
- Geschichte der physikalischen Begriffe, 1968, 2nd edn. (2 vols.), Mannheim, Bibliographisches Institut 1978 (vol. 1: Die Entstehung des mechanischen Naturbildes, vol. 2: Die Wege zum heutigen Naturbild), Spektrum Verlag 1996
- Göttingen, Kopenhagen, Leipzig im Rückblick, in Fritz Bopp (ed.) Werner Heisenberg und die Physik unserer Zeit, Braunschweig 1961
- See also Verzeichnis der Schriften Friedrich Hund (1896-1997) with about 300 entries

== See also ==
- Sharp series
- Spin isomers of hydrogen
