= Helmut Pfleger =

German chess grandmaster and author (born 1943)

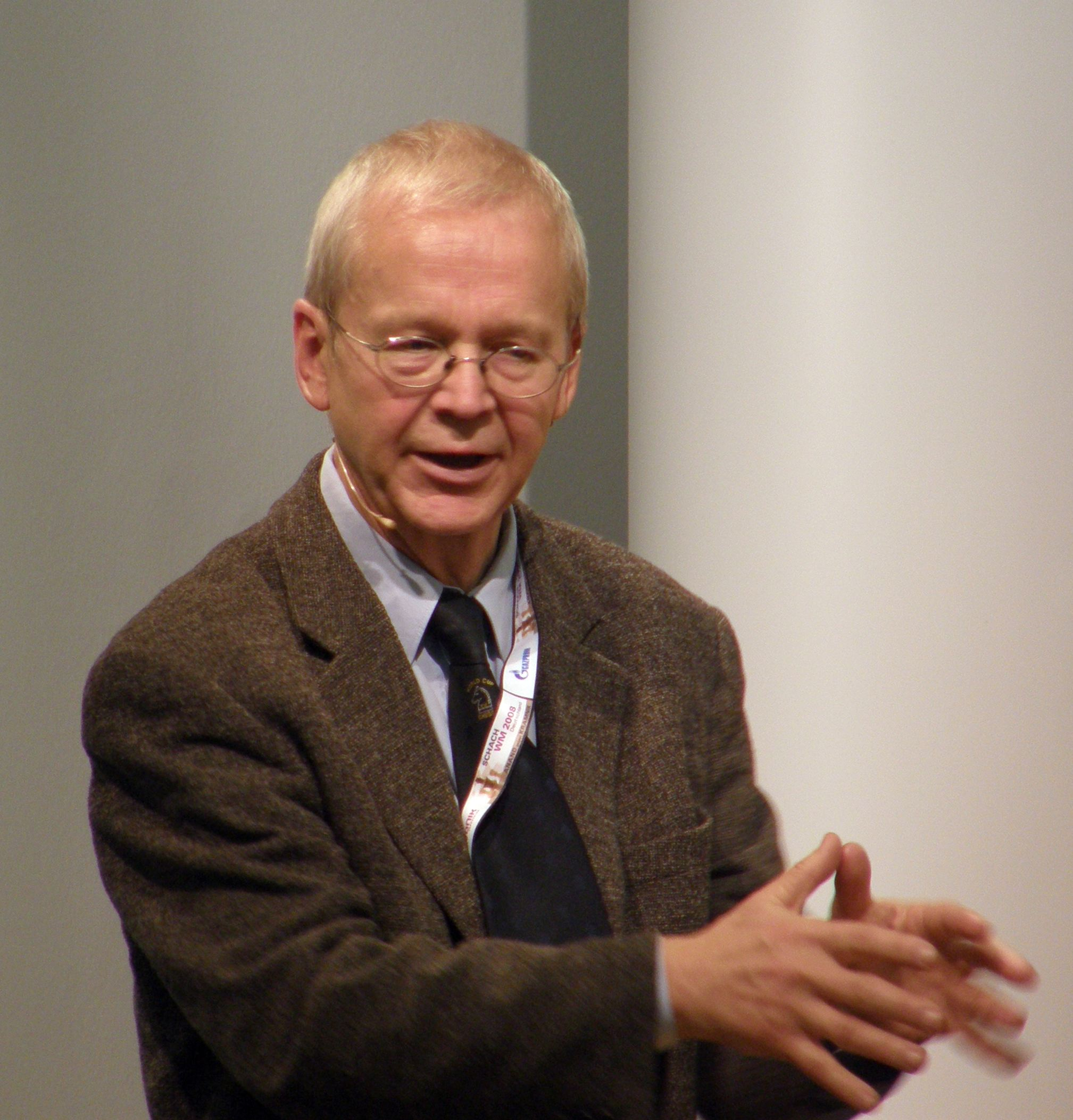
- Pfleger in 2008

Personal information
- Born: August 6, 1943 (age 82) Teplitz-Schönau, Reichsgau Sudetenland, Germany

Chess career
- Country: West Germany
- Title: Grandmaster (1975)
- FIDE rating: 2477 (July 2026)
- Peak rating: 2545 (July 1972)
- Peak ranking: No. 33 (January 1976)

Dr. Helmut Pfleger (born August 6, 1943) is a German chess grandmaster and author. He was one of the most promising chess players in the 1960s and 1970s. From 1977 until 2005, Pfleger hosted a series of chess programs on German public TV, including Chess of the Grandmasters, often together with grandmaster Vlastimil Hort. By profession, he is a doctor of medicine.

== Chess career ==
In 1960 he won the West German Junior Championship, in 1961 was fourth in the World Junior Chess Championship. In 1965 he tied for 1st with Wolfgang Unzicker in the West German Chess Championship in Bad Aibling, but lost an additional match to him there.

He took 1st at Maputo 1973, tied for 1st–2nd at Polanica-Zdrój 1971, tied for 1st–2nd at Montilla 1973, tied for 2nd–3rd at Montilla 1974, tied for 2nd–5th at Manila 1975, tied for 2nd–3rd at Havana 1982, was 4th at Royan 1988.

Pfleger played for Germany in the Chess Olympiads of 1964, 1968, 1972, 1974, 1978, 1980 and 1982. At the Tel Aviv Olympiad of 1964, he was awarded the gold medal for best performance on fourth board and a bronze medal for his contribution to the team's overall performance. He was awarded the Grandmaster title in 1975.

On the April 2009 FIDE list, he has an Elo rating of 2477, although he has been virtually inactive since 1990.

== Notable games ==
- Helmut Pfleger vs Anatoli Karpov, Hastings 1971, Queen's Indian Defense: Classical, Main Line (E19), ½–½
- Helmut Pfleger vs Mikhail Tal, Tallinn 1973, Modern Defense: Queen Pawn Fianchetto (B06), ½–½
- Helmut Pfleger vs Bent Larsen, Manila 1974, English Opening: Great Snake Variation (A10), 1-0
- John Nunn vs Helmut Pfleger, Plovdiv ETC 1983, Pirc Defense: General (B07), ½–½

== Bibliography ==
- Pfleger, Helmut; Kurz, Eugen (1982). Schach: TV-Worldcup '82 Turnier Der Schachgrossmeister Karpow, Spasski, Timman, Seirawan, Torre, Nunn, Bouaziz, Lobron (in German). Falken-Verlag. ISBN 3806841330.
- Pfleger, Helmut; Darga, Klaus (1983). Die Besten Partien Deutscher Schachgrossmeister: Klaus Darga, Hans-J. Hecht, Robert Hubner, Barbara Hund, Erik Lobron, Helmut Pfleger, Lothar Schmid, Wolfgang Unzicker (in German). Falken. ISBN 3806841217.
- Pfleger, Helmut; Metzing, Horst (1984). Schach: Spiel, Sport, Wissenschaft, Kunst (in German). Hoffmann und Campe. ISBN 3455082289.
- Pfleger, Helmut; Kishon, Ephraim; Weiner, Ossi (1986). Der Schachcomputer: Gegner Und Freund (in German). Nymphenburger. ISBN 3485016969.
- Pfleger, Helmut; Treppner, Gerd (1989). Chess: The Mechanics of the Mind. Trafalgar Square. ISBN 1852231270.
